= Divezeri =

Coordinates: 57°08′17″N 24°21′43″E

Divezeri is a village in Ādaži Parish, Ādaži Municipality in the historical region of Vidzeme, and the Riga Planning Region in Latvia. The village is located on the shores of Lake Dūņezers, eight km north of the municipal center of Ādaži.

Former Latvian Minister of Health Guntis Belēvičs is a developer based in the village.
