= Atari, Ādaži Municipality =

Coordinates: 57.0675°N 24.2694°E

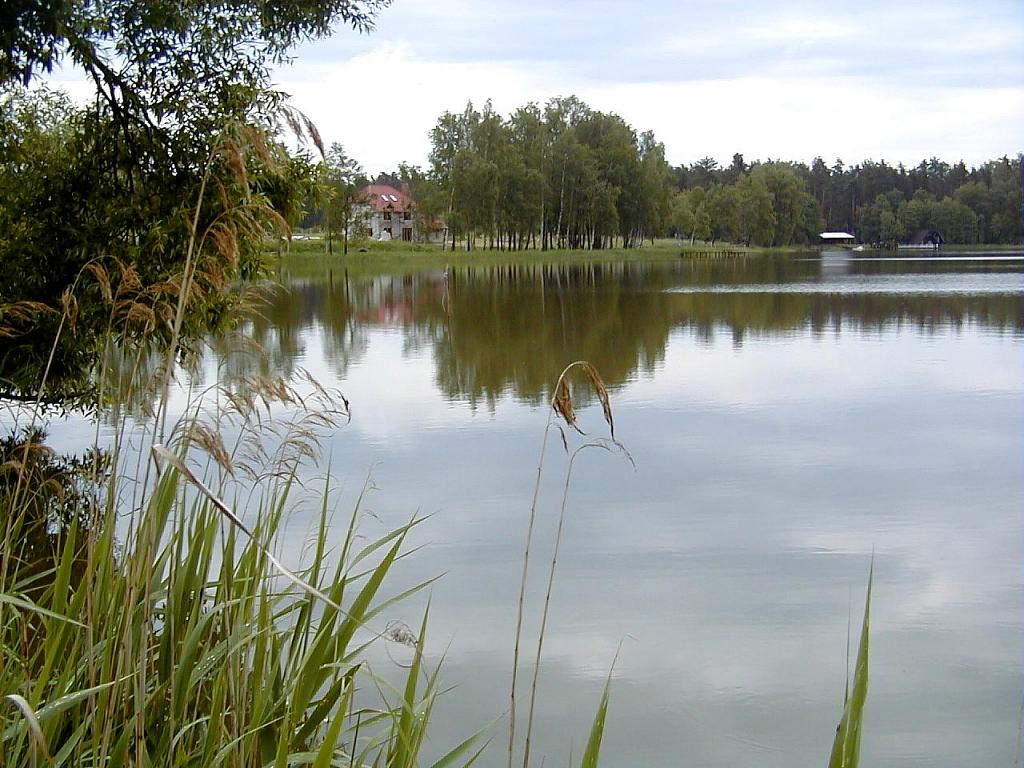
Lake Atari

Atari is a village in Ādaži Parish, Ādaži Municipality, located in the historical region of Vidzeme and the Riga Planning Region of Latvia. It lies 7 km west of the municipal center of Ādaži, near Lake Atari. The population in 2025 was 164.

The village’s origins trace back to the former Atari pusmuiža (folwark), also known as Ottern.
