= Daiga Mieriņa =

Latvian politician (born 1969)

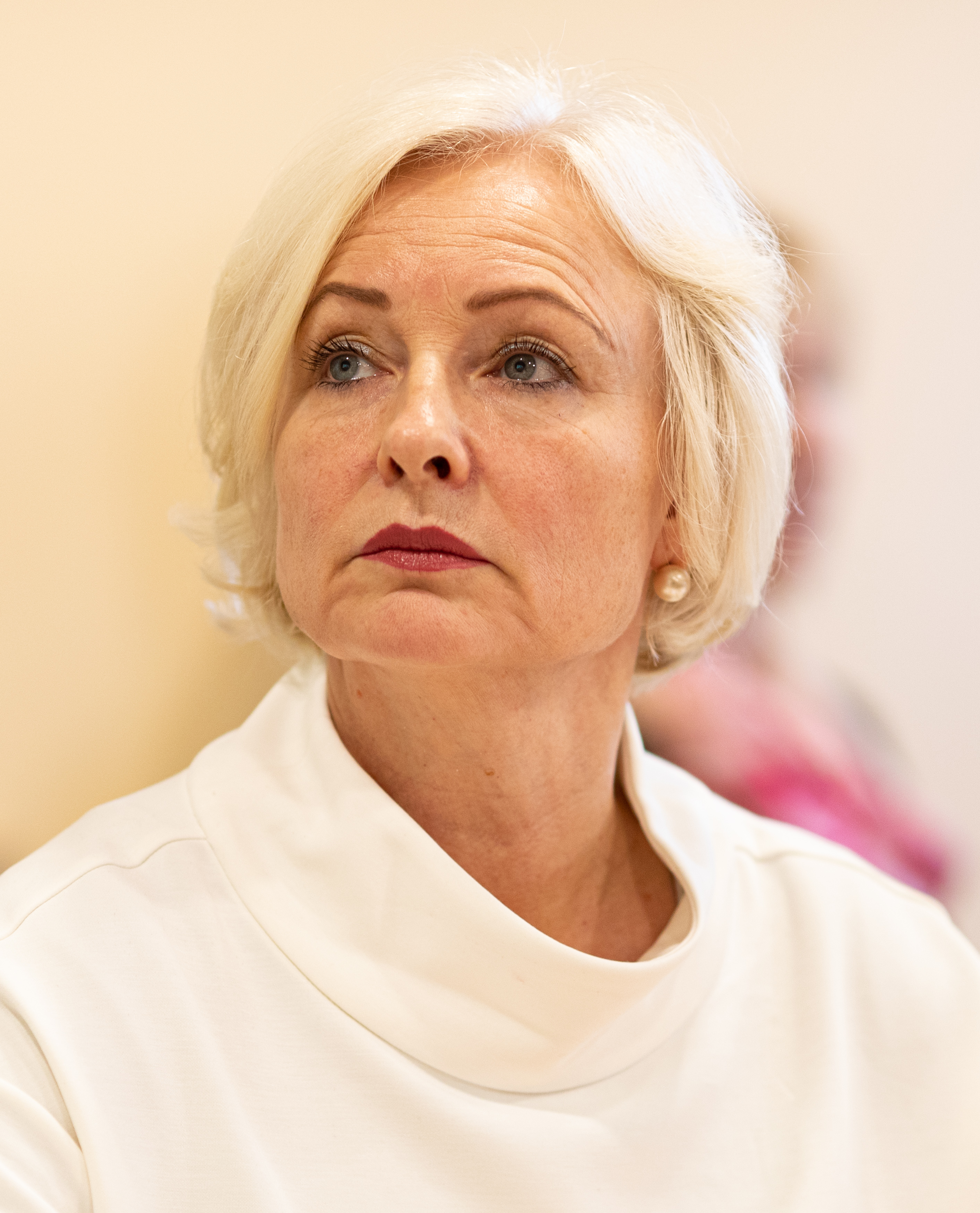
- Mieriņa in 2023

13th Speaker of the Saeima
- In office 20 September 2023 – 3 November 2026
- President: Edgars Rinkēvičs
- Prime Minister: Evika Siliņa; Andris Kulbergs
- Preceded by: Edvards Smiltēns
- Succeeded by: Edvards Smiltēns

Member of the Saeima
- Incumbent
- Assumed office 1 November 2022

Mayor of Carnikava
- In office 20 January 2016 – 1 July 2021
- Preceded by: Imants Krastiņš
- Succeeded by: Office abolished
- In office 1 July 2009 – 16 December 2015
- Preceded by: Elfa Sloceniece
- Succeeded by: Imants Krastiņš

Personal details
- Born: Daiga Cekule; 3 March 1969 (age 57) Riga, Latvian SSR, Soviet Union
- Party: Union of Greens and Farmers
- Education: Latvia University of Life Sciences and Technologies

Daiga Mieriņa (née Cekule; previously Jurēvica, born 3 March 1969) is a Latvian politician who has been the 13th Speaker of the Saeima and in the Saeima since 2023, as a member of the Union of Greens and Farmers. She was active in the local politics of Carnikava and Ādaži.

== Early life and education ==
Daiga Cekule was born in Riga, Latvian SSR, Soviet Union, on 3 March 1969. She graduated from Bulduri Horticultural School, from the Latvia University of Agriculture with a bachelor's degree in horticulture, and from Riga Technical University with a master's degree in total quality management.

== Career ==
From 1998 to 2001, Mieriņa worked at the State Revenue Service. She was the head of the Internal and Financial Audit Department in the Ministry of Transport from 2004 to 2009. At the State JSC Electronic Communications Directorate she was a council member from 2005 to 2009.

Mieriņa served on the Carnikava Municipality Council from 2001 to 2009, and as its mayor from 2009 to 2021. The council was merged into the Ādaži Municipality Council, which she served on from 2021 to 2022. The Board of Pierīga Local Government Association was chaired by Mieriņa from 2015 to 2016. She was chair of the Development Council of the Riga Planning Region from 2017 to 2021.

In the 2022 election Mieriņa was elected to the Saeima as a member of the Union of Greens and Farmers (ZZS). During her tenure in the Saeima she served as chair of the Public Administration and Local Government committee.

Gunārs Kūtris was nominated by the ZZS for Speaker, but failed to receive enough support. Mieriņa was put forward as a candidate and was elected on 20 September 2023, with 55 in favour and 34 against.

== Personal life ==
Mieriņa is married and is the mother of three children.

== Works cited ==
=== News ===
- Līcīte, Madara (20 September 2023). "Kūtris negūst atbalstu – rīko jaunas Saeimas spīkera vēlēšanas". Public Broadcasting of Latvia. Archived from the original on 28 June 2025.

=== Web ===
- "Daiga Mieriņa, Speaker of the Saeima". Saeima. Archived from the original on 28 June 2025.
- "Saeimas priekšsēdētājas amatā ievēlēta Daiga Mieriņa". Saeima. Archived from the original on 28 June 2025.
