= Pierīga =

Statistical region of Latvia

Coordinates: 57°0′0″N 24°0′0″E

Pierīga Region
- statistical regions
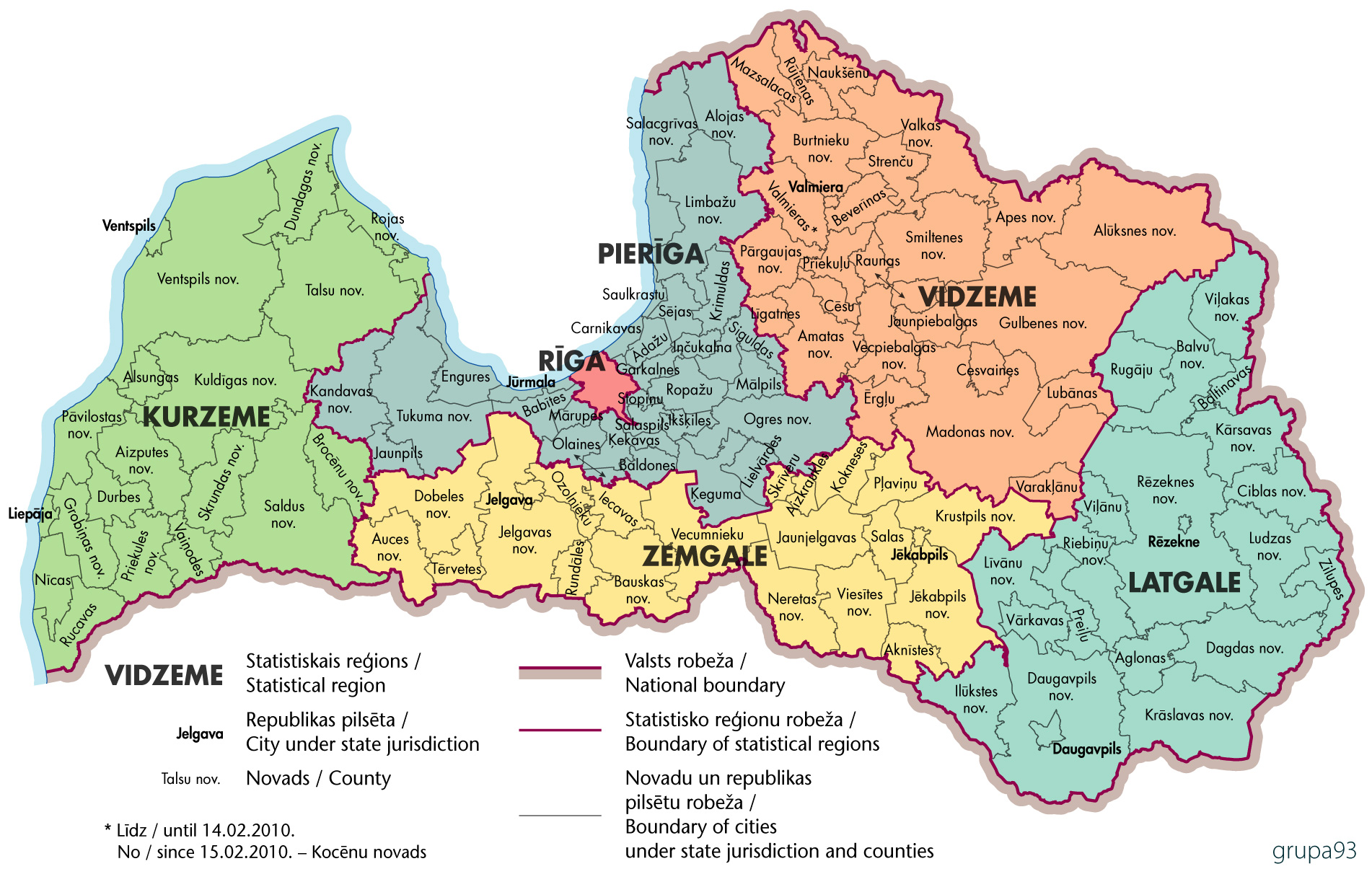
- Country: Latvia

Area
  - Total: 10,134 km^{2} (3,913 sq mi)

Population
  - Total: 370,504
  - Density: 36/km^{2} (93/sq mi)

Pierīga Region was one of the six statistical regions of Latvia. On October 27, 2024, the region was divided between the Riga Planning Region and Vidzeme.

== History ==
On March 15, 1226, the Pope Legate of Rome, William of Modena, granted the city of Riga its administrative area or mark (Latin: marchia). Until 1606, the site was called the Riga Landfall, but after being included in Swedish Livonia, it was renamed Riga Patrimonial district and was added to Riga County.

Following the administrative reform of 1783, the southern part of Cesis County was added to the Riga district, but the northern part was added to the newly created Valmieras and Valka County. At that time the Riga district without the city of Riga consisted of 25 parishes: Skulte (German: St. Matthäi), Allaži (Allasch), Aizkraukle (Ascheraden), Krimulda - Peter's (Kremon-St. Peters Capelle), Dole (Dahlen), Daugavgrīva (Dünamünde), Jumprava (Jungfernhof), Jaunpils (Jürgensburg), Koknese (Kokenhusen ), Mālpils (Lemburg), Lielvarde (Lennewarden), Lēdurga - Turaida (Loddiger-Treiden), Nītaure (Nitau), Ādaži - Carnikava (Neuermühlen-Zarnikau), Ropaži (Rodenpois), Sloka (Schlok), Sigulda (Segewold), Madliena (Sissegal), Suntaži (Sunzel), Akmeņsalas (Steinholm), Ikskile - Salaspils (Uexküll-Kircholm).

On March 18, 1941, Pļaviņas city and Pļaviņas Municipality were separated from Riga district and added to former Friedrichstadt County. On January 8, 1946, Riga's Jurmala city was added by Riga, but on October 16, 1947, Ogre County was separated from Riga district. On December 31, 1949, Riga County was liquidated to include Baldone Municipality, Riga district, Saulkrasti Municipality and Sigulda Municipality. In 1956 and 1959, parts of Saulkrasti Municipality and Baldone Municipality were added to the Riga district, and in 1962 the majority of Sigulda Municipality was added.

After the restoration of the Republic of Latvia in 1990, the Riga district villages has been renamed parishes. On April 28, 2004, Statistical region of Pieriga was established: Aloja county, Adazi county, Babite county, Baldone county, Carnikava county, Engure county, Garkalne county, Ikšķile county, Inčukalns county, Jaunpils county, Jurmala, Kandava novads, Krimulda novads, Ķegums novads, Ķekavas novads, Lielvarde novads, Limbažu novads, Mālpils novads, Marupes novads, Ogre novads, Olaines novads, Ropazu novads, Salacgrīvas novads, Salaspils novads, Saulkrastu novads, Stopinu municipality, Tukums municipality

On October 12, 2006, Riga Planning Region was established, which includes the cities of Riga and Jurmala and 27 municipalities: Aloja Municipality, Adazi Municipality Babite Municipality, Baldone Municipality, Carnikava Municipality, Engure Municipality, Garkalne Municipality, Ikskile Municipality, Inčukalns Municipality, Jaunpils Municipality, Kandava Municipality, Krimulda Municipality, Ķegums Municipality, Kekava Municipality, Lielvarde Municipality, Mālpils Municipality, Mārupe Municipality, Ogre Municipality, Olaine Municipality, Ropaži Municipality, Salacgriva Municipality, Salaspils Municipality, Saulkrasti Municipality, Sēja Municipality, Sigulda Municipality, Stopiņi Municipality, Tukums Municipality.

Pursuant to the Law on Administrative Territorial Reform adopted in 1998 and the Law on Administrative Territorial Reform of the 2008 Law on Settlements, " on July 1, 2009, the Riga district was liquidated, and there are 16 municipalities in the territory now: Adazi Municipality, Babite Municipality, Carnikava Municipality, Garkalne Municipality, Inčukalns Municipality, Krimulda Municipality, Kekava Municipality, Mālpils Municipality, Mārupe Municipality, Olaine Municipality, Ropaži Municipality, Salaspils Municipality, Saulkrasti Municipality, Sēja Municipality, Sigulda Municipality, and Stopiņi Municipality.
