= Alderi =

Village in Latvia

Coordinates: 57°03′N 24°21′E

Alderi is a village in Ādaži Parish, Ādaži Municipality in the historical region of Vidzeme, and the Riga Planning Region in Latvia. The population in 2021 was 416.
