= Ādaži Protected Landscape =

Protected landscape area in Latvia

- IUCN category V (protected landscape/seascape)
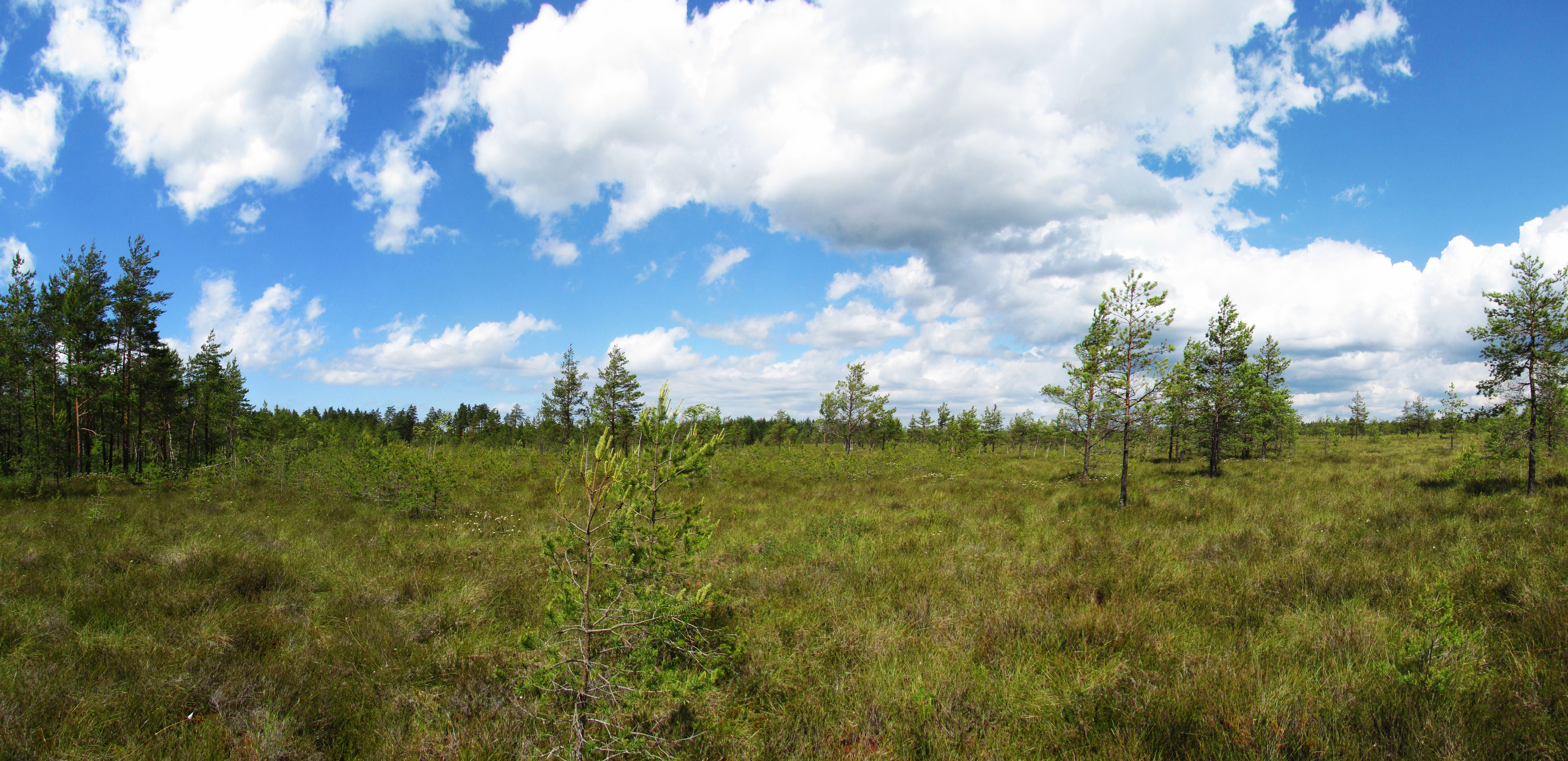
- Rampa bog landscape

- Location within Latvia
- Location: Latvia, Vidzeme
- Nearest city: Ādaži
- Coordinates: 57°10′12″N 24°26′06″E
- Area: 101.5 km^{2} (39.2 sq mi)
- Established: 2004

Ādaži was established in 2004 as a protected landscape in the current Ādaži and Saulkrasti municipalities of Latvia. It is located within the Ādaži Military Polygon (also Camp Ādaži, Ādaži Military Training Area or Kadaga Military Base) and its adjacent territories on the right banks of the lower part of the Gauja. The landscape is a Natura 2000 area.

The area was created to preserve Latvia's rare habitats created during military training - dry heaths and open inland dunes with sand dune meadows, bluish meadow meadows and mesotrophic lakes, as well as a significant number of specially protected plant and animal species. The area also includes the Lieluika and Mazuika Lakes nature reserve. Lake Mazuika is recognized as a benchmark for a clear water lake in the Baltic region.

Until 2019, economic activities in the area were governed by general rules on the use of specially protected areas, but special protection and use rules have been in force since 24 October 2019. In total 51 species of flora (2) and fauna (49) are protected under EU Nature directives.

== Flora ==
Two species of flowering plants - cutleaf anemone (Pulsatilla patens) and sand pink (Dianthus arenarius subsp. arenarius) are protected under EU Nature directives.

== Fauna ==
Protected mammals are the brown bear (Ursus arctos), Eurasian otter (Lutra lutra), western barbastelle (Barbastella barbastellus) and pond bat (Myotis dasycneme).

Protected invertebrates are the marsh fritillary (Euphydryas aurinia) and large white-faced darter (Leucorrhinia pectoralis).

Protected fishes are spined loach (Cobitis taenia), brook lamprey (Lampetra planeri), mud loach (Misgurnus fossilis) and European bitterling (Rhodeus amarus).

Protected birds are the tawny pipit (Anthus campestris), golden eagle (Aquila chrysaetos), lesser spotted eagle (Aquila pomarina), short-eared owl (Asio flammeus), hazel grouse (Bonasa bonasia), bittern (Botaurus stellaris), nightjar (Caprimulgus europaeus), white stork (Ciconia ciconia), black stork (Ciconia nigra), short-toed eagle (Circaetus gallicus), marsh harrier (Circus aeruginosus), roller (Coracias garrulus), corncrake (Crex crex), whooper swan (Cygnus cygnus), white-backed woodpecker (Dendrocopos leucotos), middle spotted woodpecker (Dendrocopos medius), black woodpecker (Dryocopus martius), ortolan bunting (Emberiza hortulana), merlin (Falco columbarius), red-breasted flycatcher (Ficedula parva), great snipe (Gallinago media), pygmy owl (Glaucidium passerinum), crane (Grus grus), little bittern (Ixobrychus minutus), red-backed shrike (Lanius collurio), woodlark (Lullula arborea), bluethroat (Luscinia svecica), osprey (Pandion haliaetus), honey buzzard (Pernis apivorus), three-toed woodpecker (Picoides tridactylus), grey-headed woodpecker (Picus canus), golden plover (Pluvialis apricaria), little crake (Porzana parva), spotted crake (Porzana porzana), Ural owl (Strix uralensis), barred warbler (Sylvia nisoria), black grouse (continental subspecies) (Tetrao tetrix tetrix), capercaillie (Tetrao urogallus) and wood sandpiper (Tringa glareola).

In total:

- 39 species of birds are protected under EU Nature directives.
- 4 species of fish are protected under EU Nature directives.
- 2 species of invertebrates are protected under EU Nature directives.
- 4 species of mammals are protected under EU Nature directives.
