= Āņi =

Village in Latvia

Coordinates: 57°05′N 24°28′E

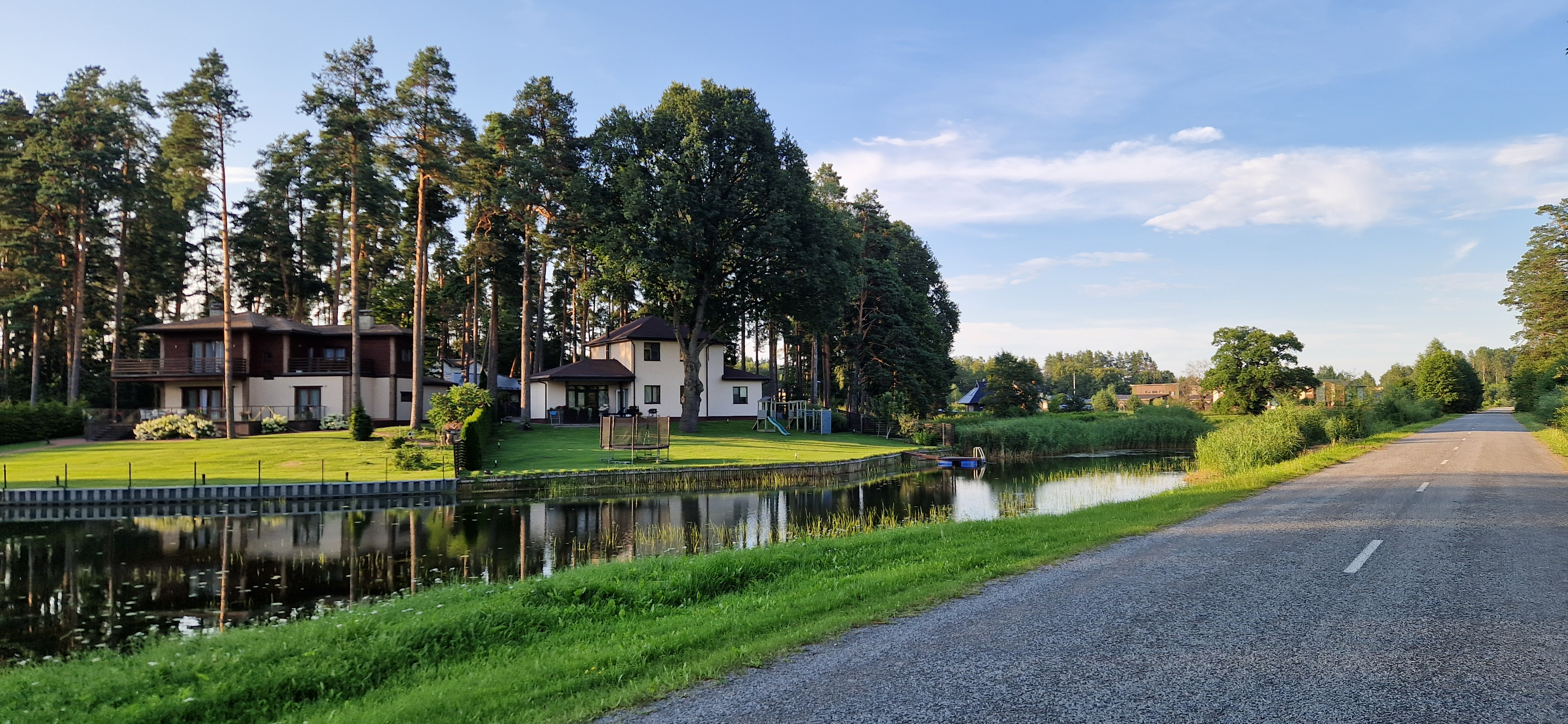
Private housing in Āņi

Āņi is a village in Ādaži Parish, Ādaži Municipality in the historical region of Vidzeme, and the Riga Planning Region in Latvia.
