= Iļķene =

Village in Ādaži Municipality, Latvia

Coordinates: 57°05′N 24°28′E

Iļķene is a village in Ādaži Parish, Ādaži Municipality in the historical region of Vidzeme, and the Riga Planning Region in Latvia. It is situated along the Gauja River.
