= List of cities and towns in Latvia =

Cities and towns in Latvia (2025)

There are 10 state cities (Latvian: valstspilsēta, pl. valstspilsētas) and 72 towns (Latvian: novada pilsēta, "municipality city/town", pl. novada pilsētas) in Latvia.

Under the Latvian Law on Administrative Territories and Populated Areas of 2020, cities and towns (in the Latvian language both use the same word - pilsēta) are settlements that are centers of culture and commerce with a well-developed architectural infrastructure and street grid, and have at least 5,000 residents. A settlement can still be designated a town if it has fewer residents, but fulfills all other requirements (or has been a historic town). After the adoption of the 2020 law, new towns that gain town rights afterwards can technically lose their status if their population drops below 2,000 residents. Existing towns were given an exemption.

To become a state city, towns should have a well-developed commercial district, transport, public utilities, social infrastructure, and be a significant center of culture. However, these requirements may be disregarded if there is sufficient population. The 2012 law stipulated that a (republic) city must typically have at least 25,000 residents, but this was not retained in the 2020 law.

In 2020, an agreement was reached in Latvian parliament, Saeima, to rename the previous nine "republic cities" (Latvian: republikas pilsētas, sing. republikas pilsēta) to "state cities". It was at this time that a tenth state city, Ogre (formerly a town), was added to the list. The seven largest state cities, have their own municipal administrations and councils (e.g. Riga City Council), whereas the smallest three (Jēkabpils, Ogre and Valmiera) belong to their wider corresponding municipalities.

== State cities ==
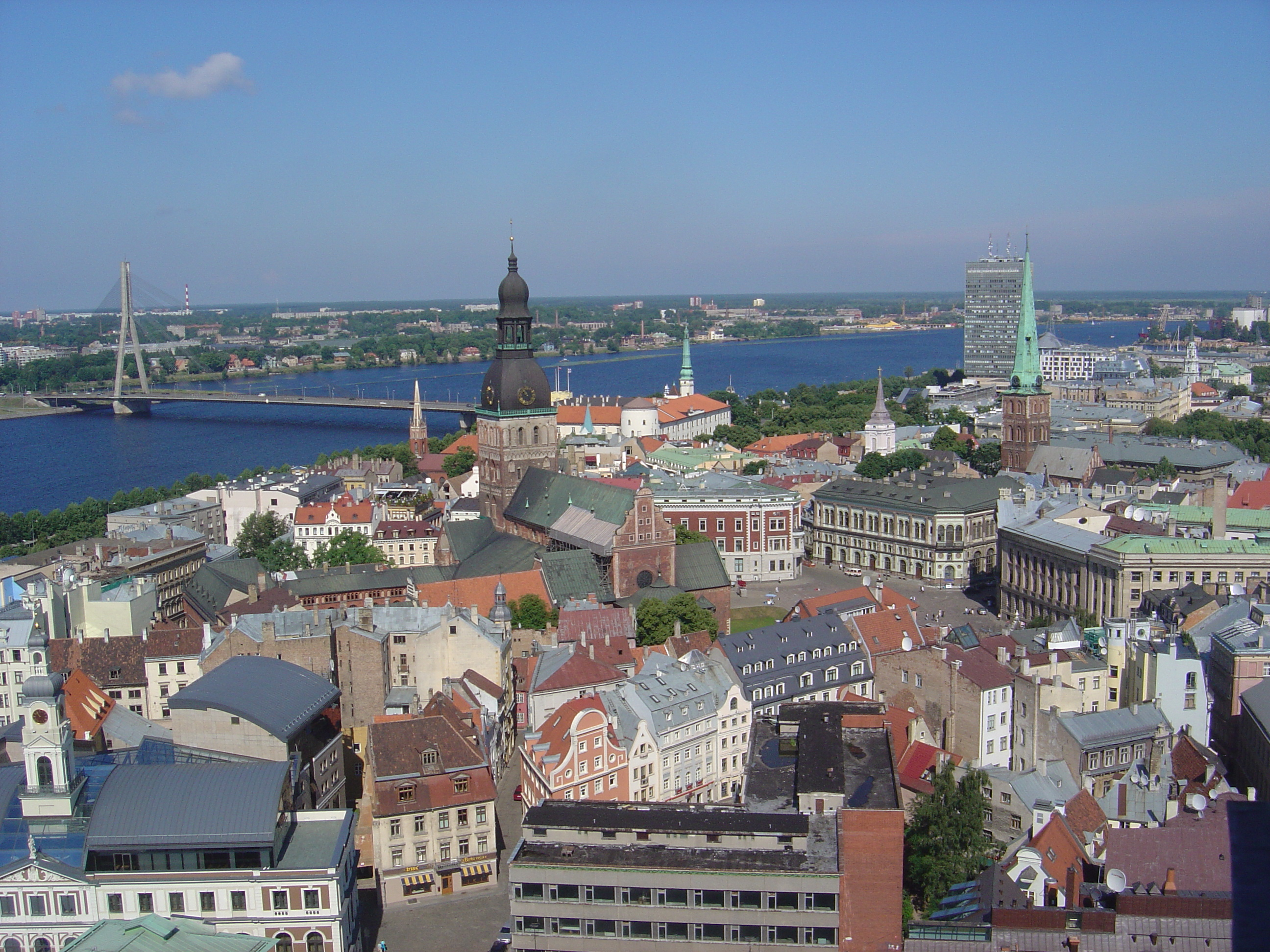
Riga

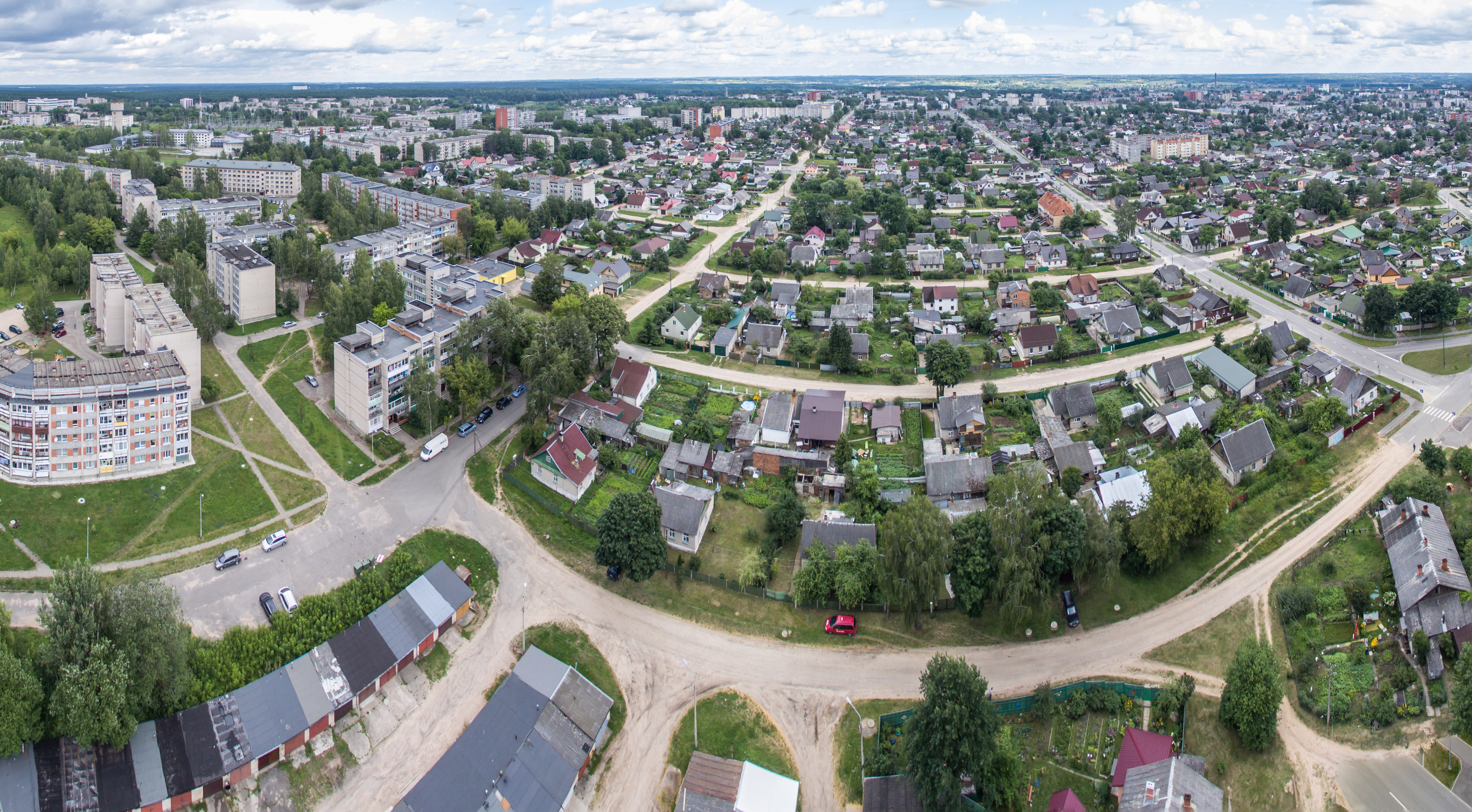
Daugavpils

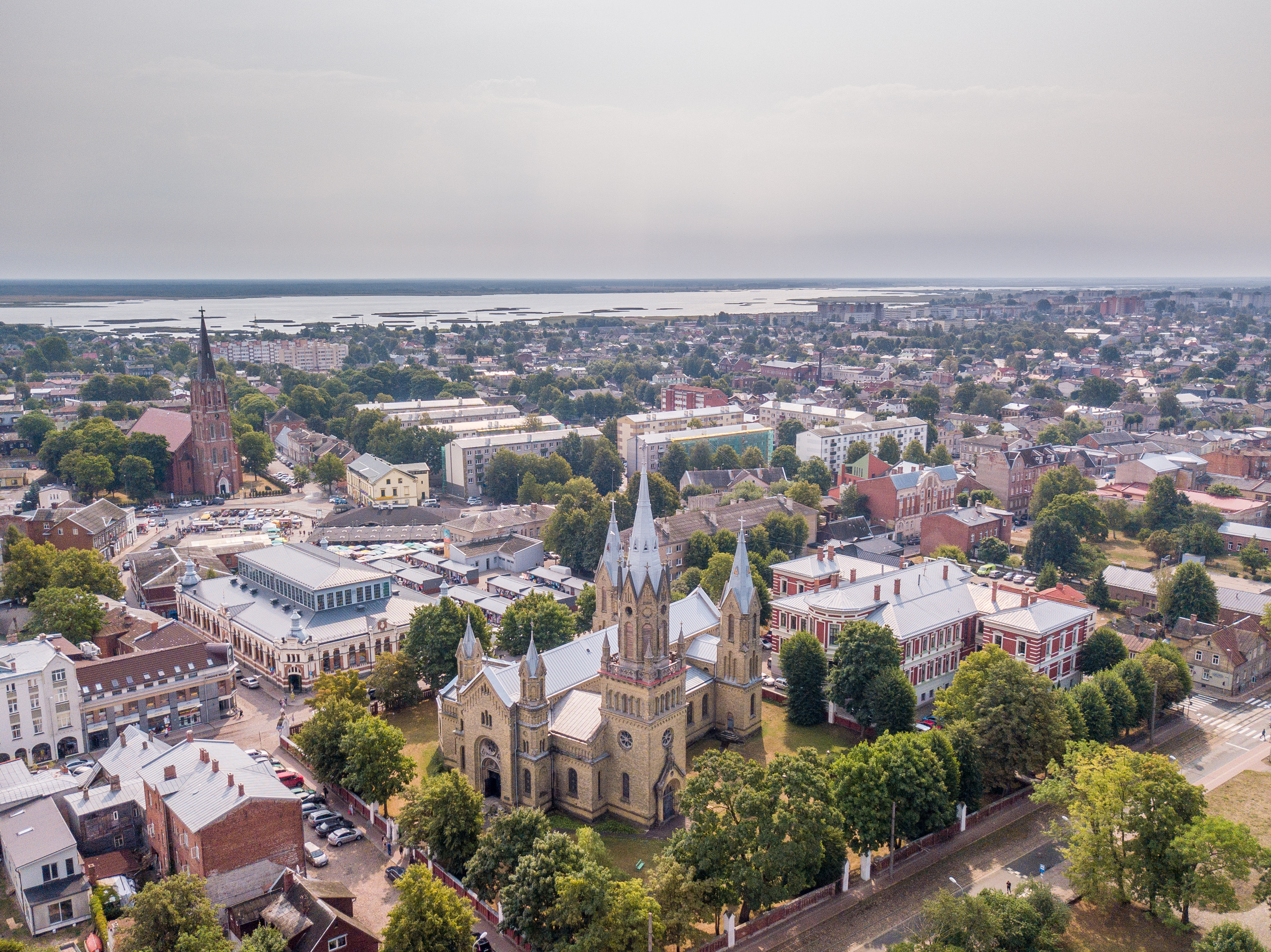
Liepāja

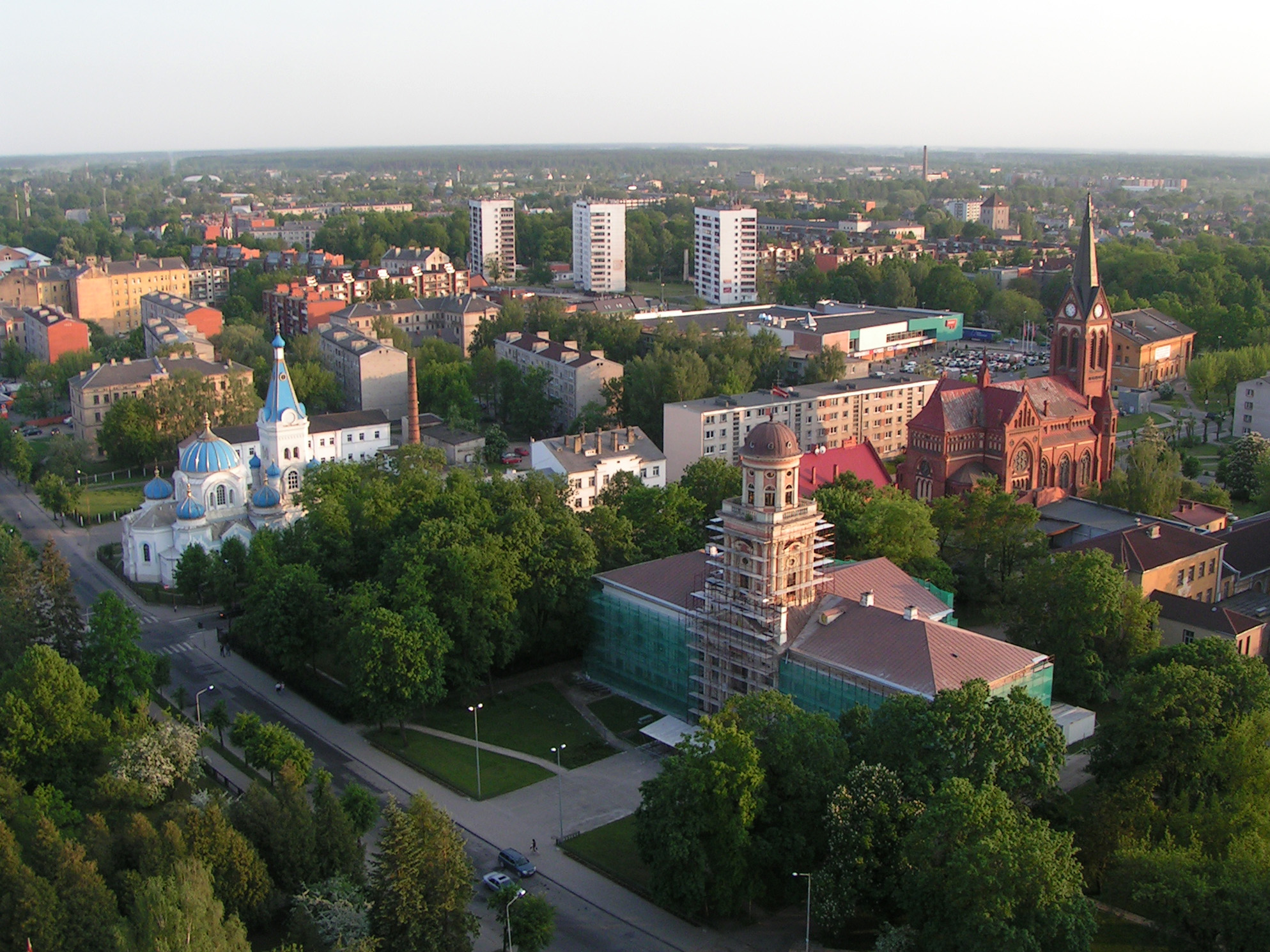
Jelgava

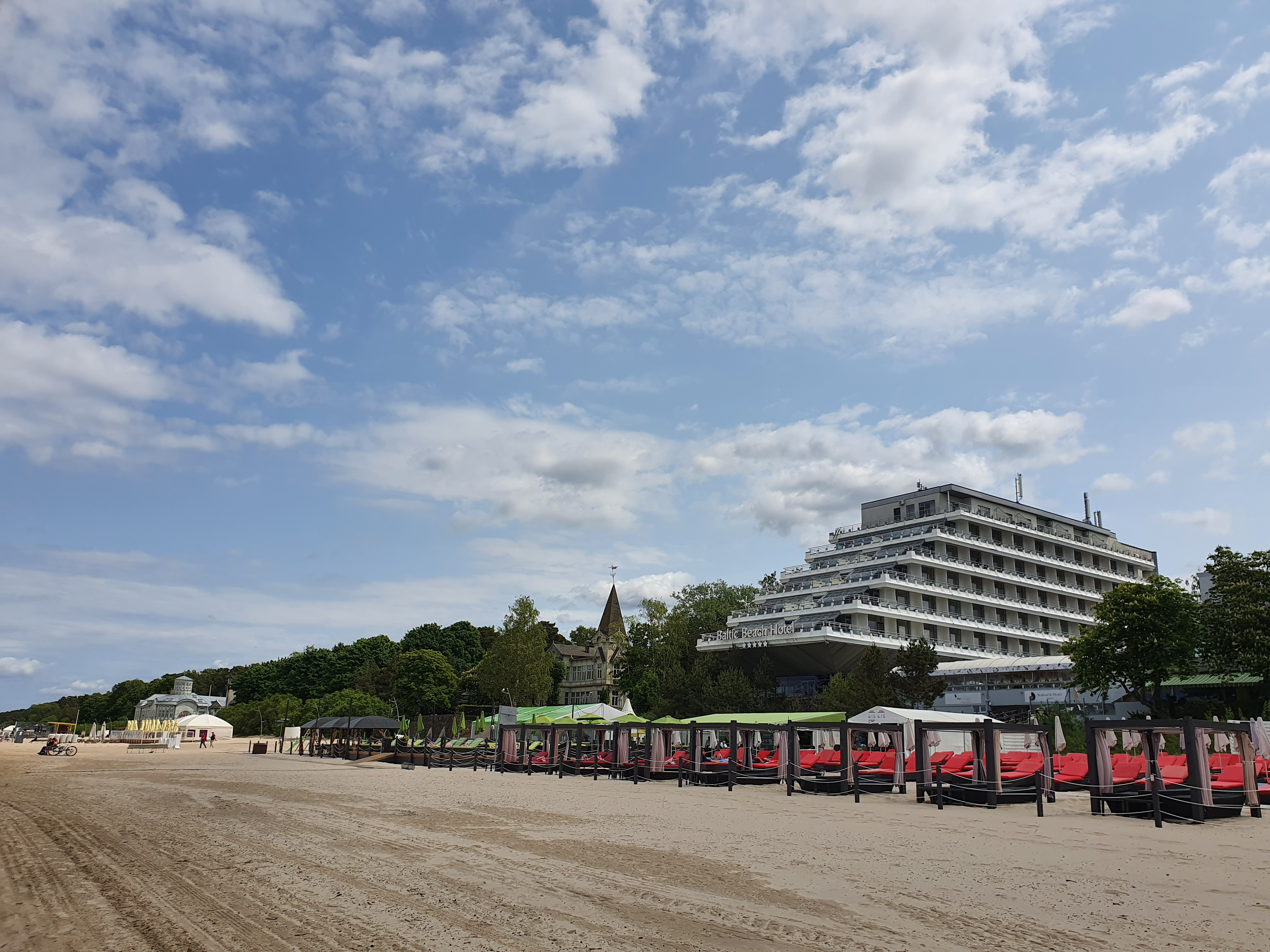
Jūrmala

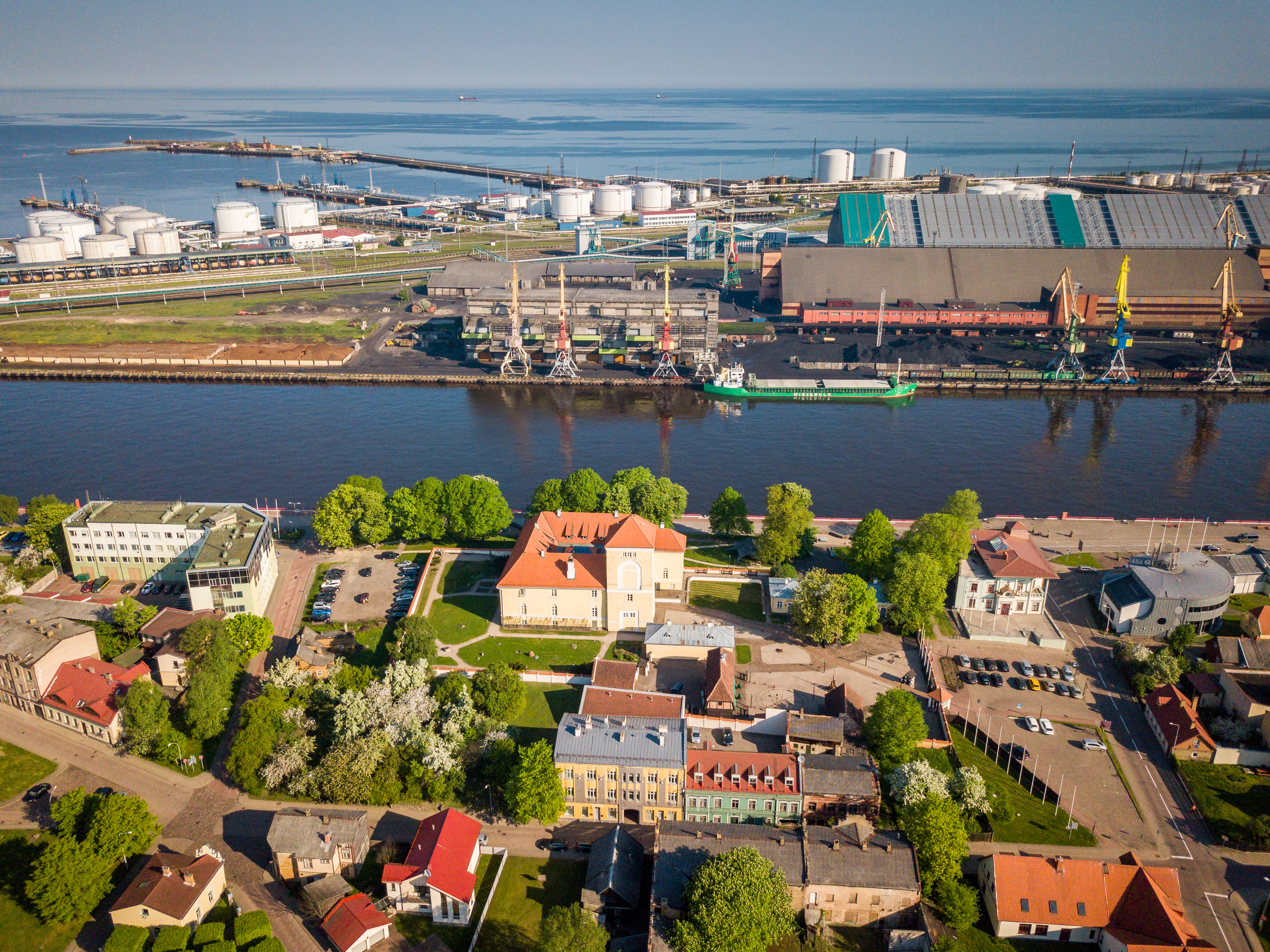
Ventspils

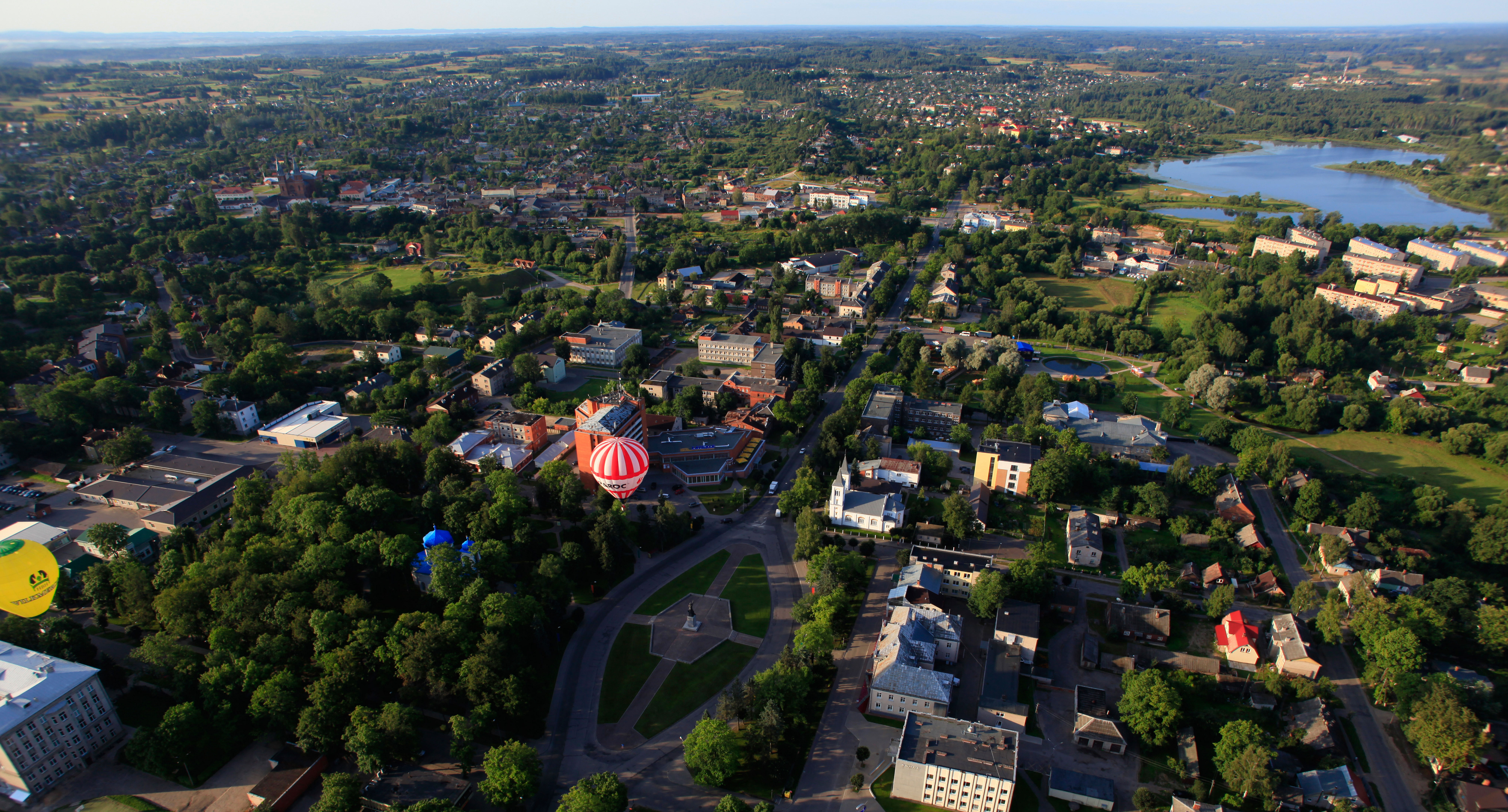
Rēzekne

| City | Population (2013) | Population (2019) | Population (2025) |
|---|---|---|---|
| Rīga | 658,640 | 632,614 | 591,882 |
| Daugavpils | 93,312 | 82,604 | 78,112 |
| Liepāja | 76,731 | 68,945 | 67,398 |
| Jelgava | 59,511 | 55,972 | 54,821 |
| Jūrmala | 50,840 | 49,325 | 51,933 |
| Ventspils | 38,750 | 34,377 | 32,719 |
| Rēzekne | 32,328 | 27,820 | 26,425 |
| Valmiera | 25,130 | 23,125 | 22,811 |
| Ogre | 26,167 | 24,768 | 22,753 |
| Jēkabpils | 24,635 | 22,076 | 21,014 |

== Towns ==
| Town | Population (2010) | Population (2018) | Population (2024) | Municipality |
|---|---|---|---|---|
| Ādaži | ~5,773 | 6,817 | 8,332 | Ādaži Municipality |
| Ainaži | 1,008 | 787 | 644 | Limbaži Municipality |
| Aizkraukle | 8,709 | 7,489 | 6,853 | Aizkraukle Municipality |
| Aizpute | 5,104 | 4,443 | 3,892 | South Kurzeme Municipality |
| Aknīste | 1,224 | 1,078 | 917 | Jēkabpils Municipality |
| Aloja | 1,353 | 1,197 | 1,060 | Limbaži Municipality |
| Alūksne | 8,900 | 7,555 | 6,175 | Alūksne Municipality |
| Ape | 1,083 | 907 | 777 | Smiltene Municipality |
| Auce | 3,076 | 2,640 | 2,136 | Dobele Municipality |
| Baldone | 2,399 | 3,966 | 3,711 | Ķekava Municipality |
| Baloži | 5,665 | 6,529 | 6,846 | Ķekava Municipality |
| Balvi | 7,906 | 6,696 | 5,584 | Balvi Municipality |
| Bauska | 10,060 | 8,988 | 9,811 | Bauska Municipality |
| Brocēni | 3,411 | 3,117 | 2,834 | Saldus Municipality |
| Carnikava | ~3,892 | 5,514 | 6,343 | Ādaži Municipality |
| Cēsis | 18,021 | 16,888 | 14,699 | Cēsis Municipality |
| Cesvaine | 1,668 | 1,443 | 1,210 | Madona Municipality |
| Dagda | 2,502 | 2,108 | 1,805 | Krāslava Municipality |
| Dobele | 11,152 | 9,702 | 8,589 | Dobele Municipality |
| Durbe | 620 | 542 | 483 | South Kurzeme Municipality |
| Grobiņa | 4,218 | 3,861 | 3,593 | South Kurzeme Municipality |
| Gulbene | 8,807 | 7,779 | 6,715 | Gulbene Municipality |
| Iecava | 5,921 | 5,481 | 5,343 | Bauska Municipality |
| Ikšķile | 4,052 | 7,359 | 7,448 | Ogre Municipality |
| Ilūkste | 2,856 | 2,502 | 2,082 | Augšdaugava Municipality |
| Jaunjelgava | 2,246 | 1,999 | 1,713 | Aizkraukle Municipality |
| Kandava | 4,225 | 3,831 | 3,276 | Tukums Municipality |
| Kārsava | 2,420 | 2,105 | 1,843 | Ludza Municipality |
| Koknese | 2,710 | 2,511 | 2,427 | Aizkraukle Municipality |
| Krāslava | 10,160 | 8,653 | 6,854 | Krāslava Municipality |
| Kuldīga | 12,755 | 11,275 | 9,940 | Kuldīga Municipality |
| Ķegums | 2,487 | 2,271 | 2,059 | Ogre Municipality |
| Ķekava | 8,048 | 8,103 | 5,039 | Ķekava Municipality |
| Lielvārde | 6,837 | 6,369 | 5,853 | Ogre Municipality |
| Līgatne | 1,239 | 1,094 | 1,009 | Cēsis Municipality |
| Limbaži | 8,501 | 7,498 | 6,613 | Limbaži Municipality |
| Līvāni | 8,934 | 7,939 | 6,790 | Līvāni Municipality |
| Lubāna | 1,873 | 1,667 | 1,453 | Madona Municipality |
| Ludza | 9,575 | 8,387 | 7,524 | Ludza Municipality |
| Madona | 8,734 | 7,646 | 6,561 | Madona Municipality |
| Mazsalaca | 1,474 | 1,264 | 1,113 | Valmiera Municipality |
| Mārupe | 7,754 | 21,229 | 16,544 | Mārupe Municipality |
| Olaine | 12,667 | 11,342 | 9,908 | Olaine Municipality |
| Pāvilosta | 1,134 | 980 | 851 | South Kurzeme Municipality |
| Piltene | 1,053 | 904 | 821 | Ventspils Municipality |
| Pļaviņas | 3,692 | 3,248 | 2,823 | Aizkraukle Municipality |
| Preiļi | 7,970 | 6,817 | 5,841 | Preiļi Municipality |
| Priekule | 2,441 | 2,091 | 1,810 | South Kurzeme Municipality |
| Rūjiena | 3,377 | 2,912 | 2,650 | Valmiera Municipality |
| Sabile | 1,404 | 1,552 | 1,369 | Talsi Municipality |
| Salacgrīva | 3,281 | 2,823 | 2,480 | Limbaži Municipality |
| Salaspils | 18,159 | 18,698 | 17,826 | Salaspils Municipality |
| Saldus | 12,306 | 10,869 | 9,553 | Saldus Municipality |
| Saulkrasti | 3,299 | 3,176 | 3,149 | Saulkrasti Municipality |
| Seda | 1,547 | 1,248 | 1,092 | Valmiera Municipality |
| Sigulda | 11,168 | 11,191 | 14,632 | Sigulda Municipality |
| Skrunda | 2,468 | 2,118 | 1,767 | Kuldīga Municipality |
| Smiltene | 5,763 | 5,349 | 5,129 | Smiltene Municipality |
| Staicele | 1,152 | 951 | 766 | Limbaži Municipality |
| Stende | 1,868 | 1,743 | 1,532 | Talsi Municipality |
| Strenči | 1,404 | 1,140 | 957 | Valmiera Municipality |
| Subate | 749 | 663 | 549 | Augšdaugava Municipality |
| Talsi | 11,201 | 10,070 | 8,649 | Talsi Municipality |
| Tukums | 19,961 | 18,414 | 16,318 | Tukums Municipality |
| Valdemārpils | 1,396 | 1,343 | 1,135 | Talsi Municipality |
| Valka | 6,047 | 5,181 | 4,564 | Valka Municipality |
| Vangaži | 3,999 | 3,649 | 3,192 | Ropaži Municipality |
| Varakļāni | 2,106 | 1,897 | 1,653 | Madona Municipality |
| Viesīte | 1,902 | 1,615 | 1,510 | Jēkabpils Municipality |
| Viļaka | 1,525 | 1,364 | 1,172 | Balvi Municipality |
| Viļāni | 3,468 | 3,035 | 2,749 | Rēzekne Municipality |
| Zilupe | 1,746 | 1,511 | 1,271 | Ludza Municipality |

== See also ==
- Administrative divisions of Latvia
- Districts of Latvia
- Cultural regions of Latvia
- List of former cities of Latvia
- List of the most populated municipalities in the Nordic countries
