= Stapriņi =

Village in Latvia

Coordinates: 57°08′13″N 24°31′00″E

Stapriņi is a village in Ādaži Municipality in the historical region of Vidzeme, and the Riga Planning Region in Latvia.
