= Birznieki, Ādaži Municipality =

Village in Latvia

Coordinates: 57.1044°N 24.3008°E

Birznieki is a village in Ādaži Municipality in the historical region of Vidzeme, and the Riga Planning Region in Latvia.
