= Garkalne, Ādaži Municipality =

Village in Latvia

Coordinates: 57°4′22″N 24°25′29″E

Garkalne is a village in Ādaži Municipality in the historical region of Vidzeme, and the Riga Planning Region in Latvia.
