= Kadaga =

Village in Latvia

Coordinates: 57°06′N 24°22′E

Picture of town of cadaga

Kadaga (also known as Ādaži-2) is a village in the Ādaži Parish of Ādaži Municipality in the Vidzeme region of Latvia, near the town of Ādaži.

The village was established across the Gauja from Ādaži during the Soviet occupation of Latvia as a military townlet for Soviet soldiers stationed at the Ādaži Training Area. Today, the main complex of the training area – the Ādaži Military Base – is located within Kadaga, and various modern civilian housing projects have been built in the village as well. A beach is situated on the shores of Kadaga Lake.

The population in 2021 was 2,230 and its area is 15.28 km^{2} (5.90 sq mi). It is also located in the historical region of Vidzeme and the Riga Planning Region.
