= Carnikava Municipality =

Municipality of Latvia

Coordinates: 57.1167°N 24.2333°E

Carnikava Municipality Carnikavas novads
- Former municipality
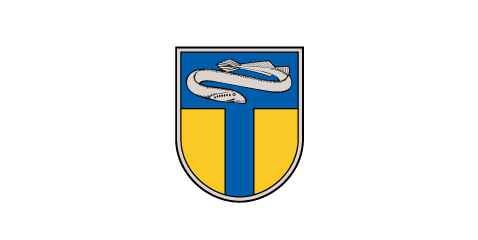
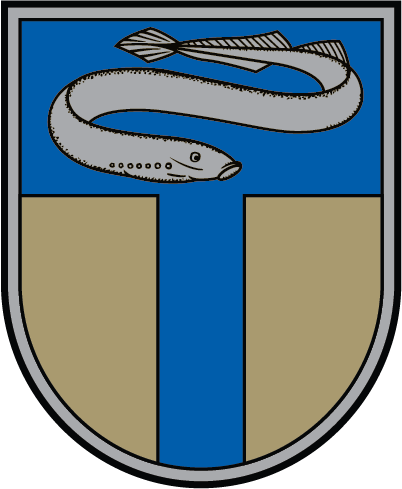
- Flag Coat of arms

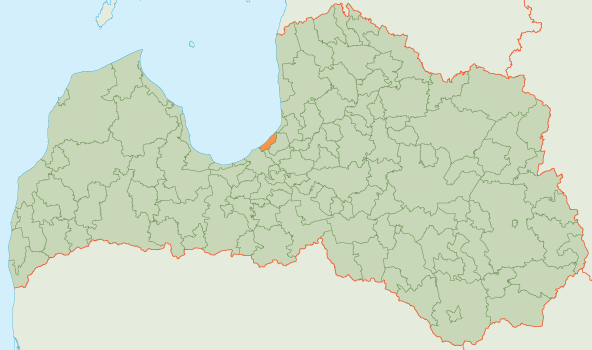
- Location in Latvia

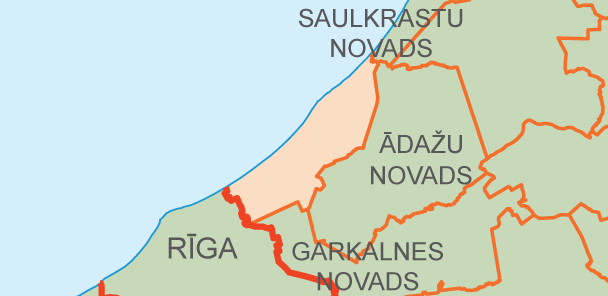
- Country: Latvia
- Formed: 2006
- Dissolved: 2021
- Centre: Carnikava

Government
  - Council Chair: Daiga Mieriņa (LZS, last)

Area
  - Total: 80.66 km^{2} (31.14 sq mi)
  - Land: 75.99 km^{2} (29.34 sq mi)
  - Water: 4.67 km^{2} (1.80 sq mi)

Population (2021)
  - Total: 9,310
  - Density: 123/km^{2} (317/sq mi)
- Postal code: LV-2163
- Website: www.carnikava.lv

Carnikava Municipality (Latvian: Carnikavas novads) is a former municipality in Vidzeme, Latvia. The municipality was formed in 2006 by reorganization of Carnikava Parish of the Riga district, with the administrative centre being Carnikava. The population in 2009 was 6,261 people.

The parish itself was created in 1992 after splitting from Ādaži Parish. After the municipal reform of 2009, the districts were abolished and the Municipality became a national administrative unit. On 1 July 2021, Carnikava Municipality ceased to exist and its territory was merged into Ādaži Municipality as Carnikava Parish.

== Symbols ==
The coat of arms, first adopted in 2002 for the parish, featured a Carnikava lamprey and the mouth of the Gauja River, which flows into the Gulf of Riga in Carnikava. In 2015, the coat of arms was modified to bring the drawing of the lamprey closer to its real-life appearance. After Carnikava Municipality was merged into Ādaži Municipality, the old coat of arms remained as the symbol of Carnikava Parish yet again.

== Nature ==
The total area of the county is 80.2 square kilometers, which is the third smallest county in Latvia after the Saulkrasti and Stopiņi Municipalities, moreover, most of it is covered by forests, but a quarter of the total area is used for agriculture. Carnikava is known for its Piejūra ('Seaside') Nature Park, which is part of the European Union's Natura 2000 network of specially protected areas and which contains a number of protected plant species. Many plant species characteristic of non-draining, clear-water lakes have been found in Lake Ummis: Lobelia dortmanna, lakes, etc. Several rare bat species have been found near Garezeri Lakes. The park occupies about one-fifth of the entire territory of the municipality. There are five rivers and canals, eight lakes and four lake islands in the area. The region has a 19-kilometer-long beach along the Vidzeme coast of the Gulf of Riga from Kalngale to Lilaste.

Rivers: Gauja, Langa, Eimuri Canal, Dzirnupe, Vecgauja.

== See also ==
- Administrative divisions of Latvia
