= Bukulti =

Neighbourhood of Riga, Latvia

Coordinates: 57.0000°N 24.2670°E

- Neighbourhood of Riga
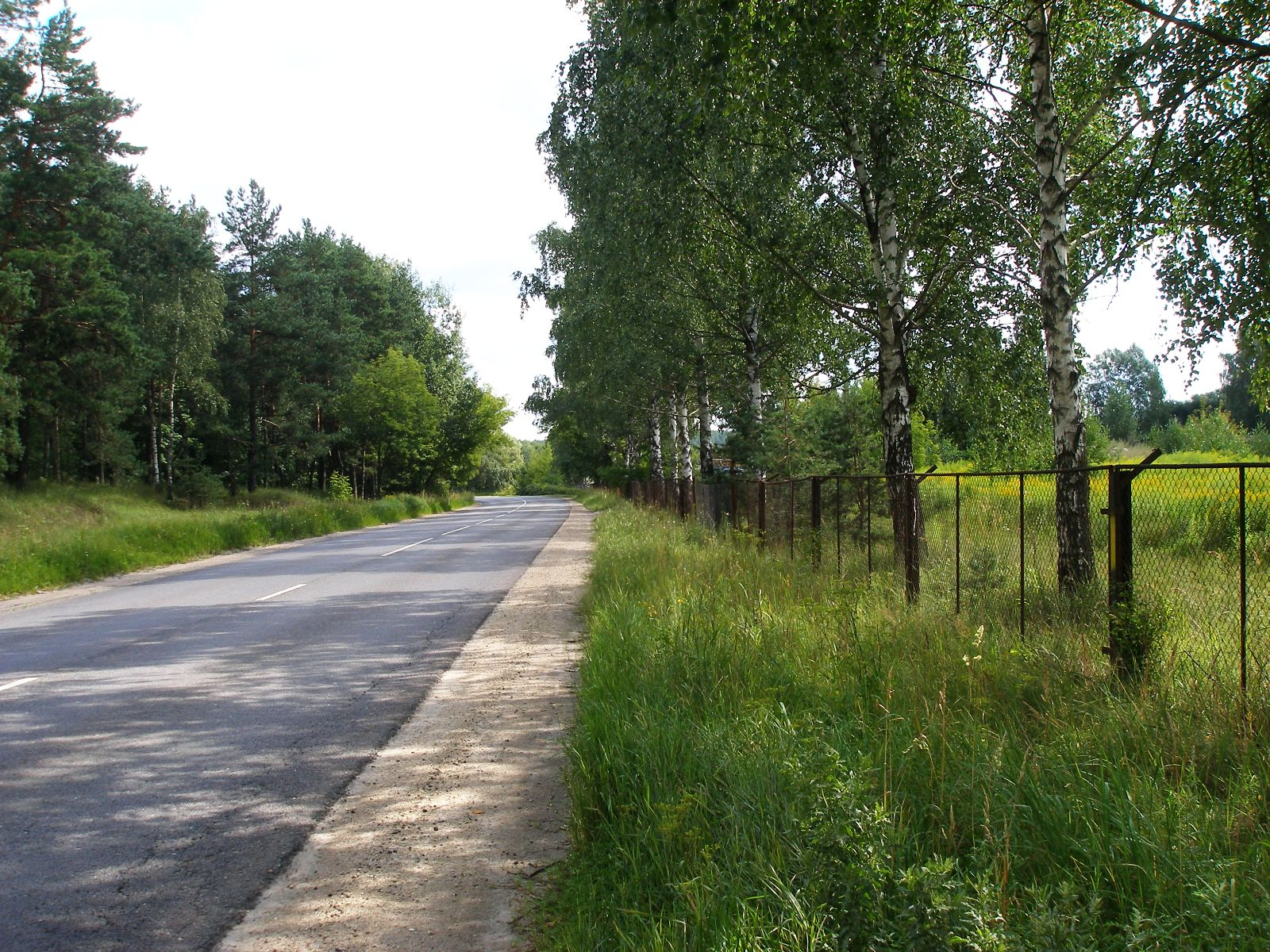
- Jaunciema gatve (Jaunciems Street) in Bukulti

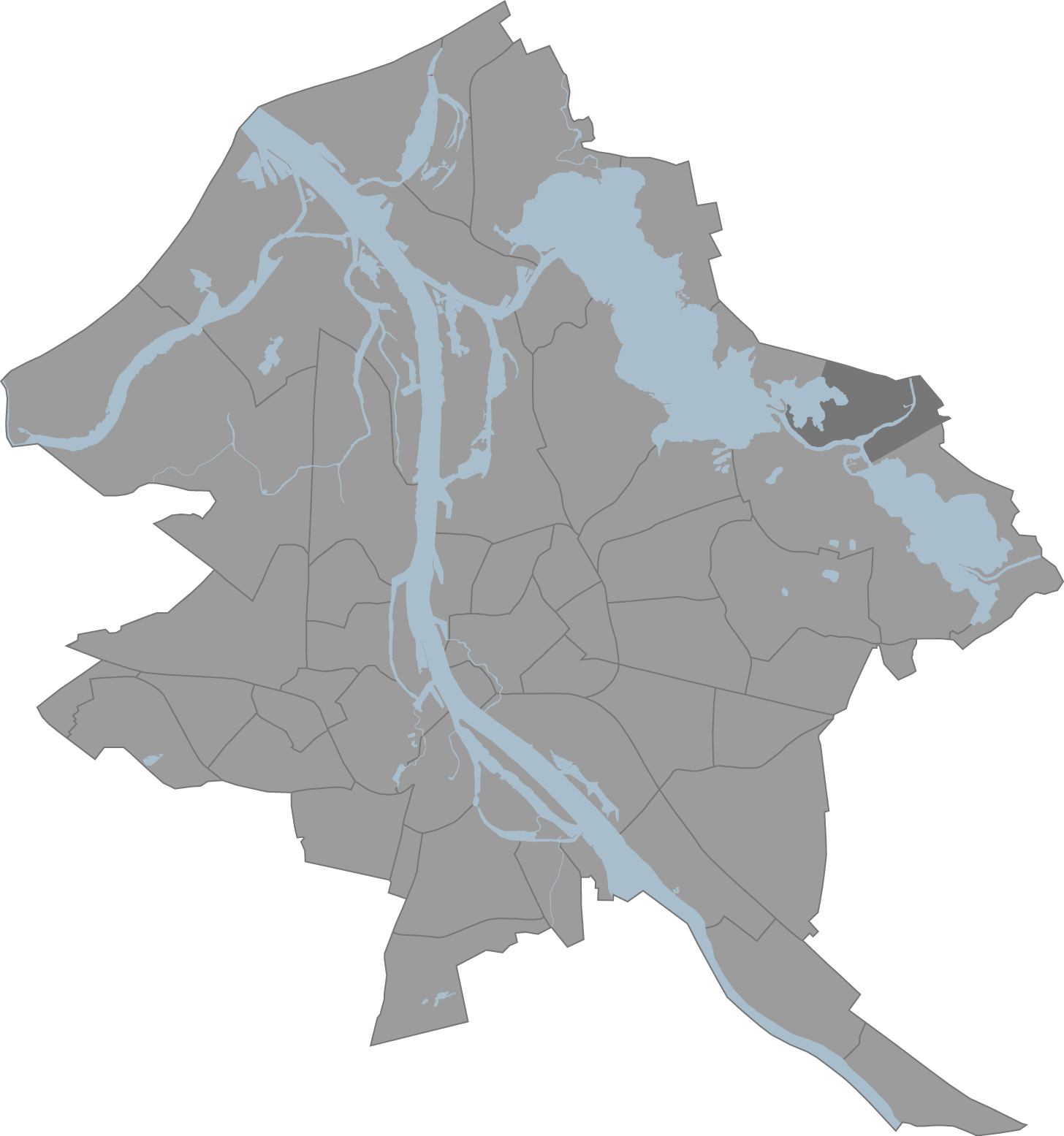
- Location of Bukulti in Riga
- Country: Latvia
- City: Riga
- District: Vidzeme Suburb

Area
  - Total: 5.183 km^{2} (2.001 sq mi)

Population (2017)
  - Total: 671
  - Density: 129/km^{2} (335/sq mi)
- Postal code: LV-1024
- Website: apkaimes.lv

Bukulti is a neighbourhood of Riga, the capital of Latvia, located in the northeastern part of the Vidzeme Suburb.

== Demographics ==
As of 2013, a survey was taken with residents of the neighbourhood and 62% said they enjoyed their life in Bukulti. 51% of surveyees claimed the best part about the area was the Baltezers Canal.

== History ==
Early mentions of the settlement come from the 12th and 13th century. The earliest one dates to 1297, when a mill named Neiermīle mill (Novum Molendinum) was built by the Livonian Order. Later, the Livonian Order built a stone castle.

== Highways and railways ==
In 1837, the Riga-Neiermīle highway started operating. In 1858, this road was added to the Saint Petersburg–Warsaw railway. In 1889, the Riga-Pskov railway was opened.

== Landmarks ==
The Neiermīle mill was opened in 1297 by the Livonian Order, and it was destroyed in 1559, during the Livonian War and rebuilt in 1586. It was destroyed again in 1624, and yet again in 1656 during the Second Northern War, but was rebuilt yet again. The mill was forced to close in 1894 because the mill pond was flooding the nearby crops.
