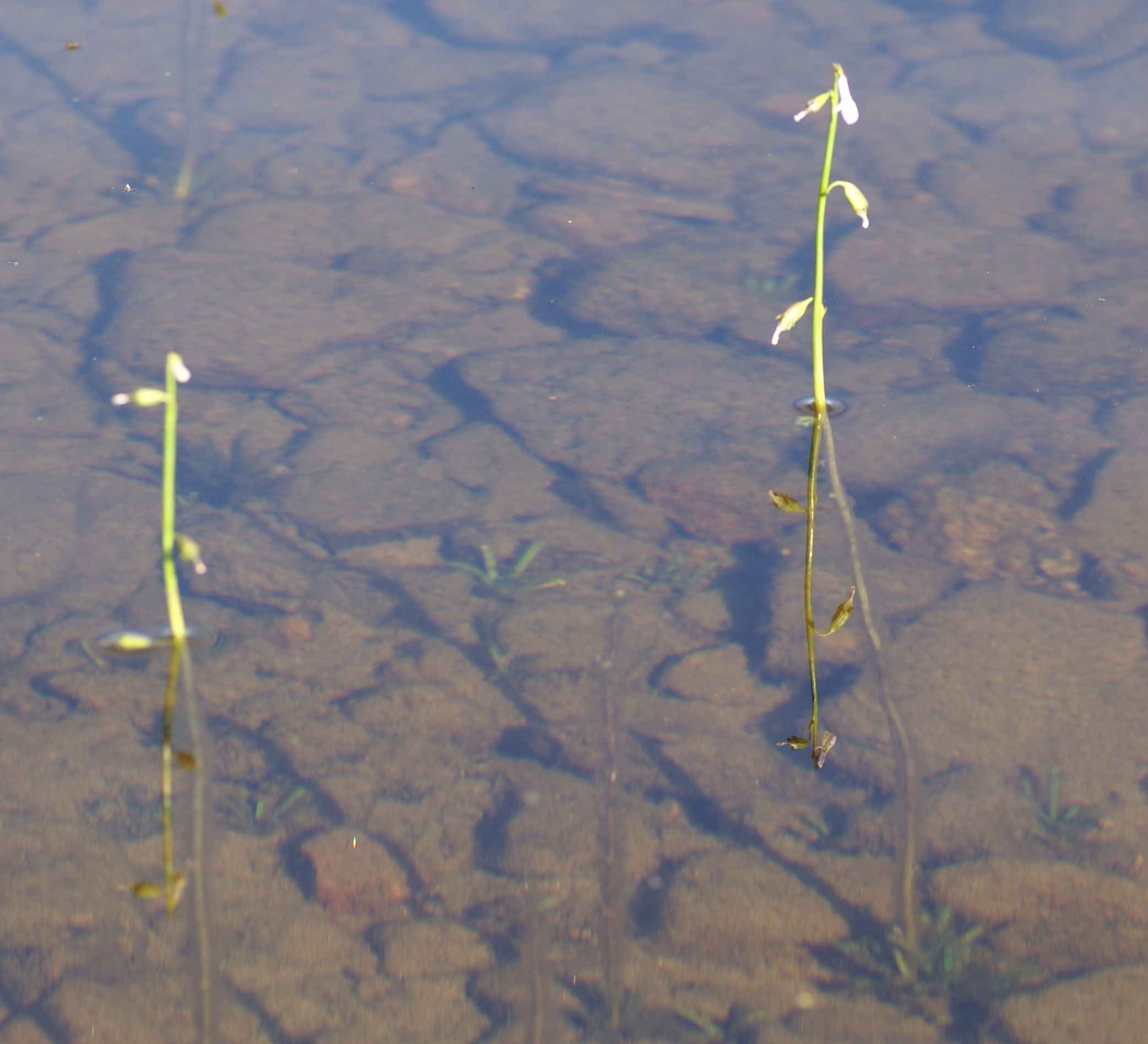
- Plants in pond habitat

Conservation status
- Least Concern (IUCN 3.1)

Scientific classification
- Kingdom: Plantae
- Clade: Tracheophytes
- Clade: Angiosperms
- Clade: Eudicots
- Clade: Asterids
- Order: Asterales
- Family: Campanulaceae
- Genus: Lobelia
- Species: L. dortmanna

Binomial name
- Lobelia dortmanna L.

= Lobelia dortmanna =

Species of aquatic plant

Lobelia dortmanna, Dortmann's cardinalflower or water lobelia, is a species of flowering plant in the bellflower family Campanulaceae. This stoloniferous herbaceous perennial aquatic plant with basal leaf-rosettes and flower stalks grows to 0.7–2 m (2.3–6.6 ft) tall. The flowers are 1–2 cm long, with a five-lobed white to pale pink or pale blue corolla, produced in groups of one to ten on an erect raceme held above the water surface. The fruit is a capsule 5–10 mm long and 3–5 mm wide, containing numerous small seeds.

The leaves are almost cylindrical, blunt, 2.5–7.5 cm long and evergreen. They have no functional stomata. It is one of several unrelated species of plants from low nutrient lakes known as isoetids, owing to their superficial similarity to Isoetes. The leaves of Lobelia dortmanna are, however, easily distinguishable from those of other isoetids in having only two air-canals (Isoetes having four and most others several) and in the presence of milky sap. The plant has the unusual ability of removing carbon dioxide from the rooting zone rather than from the atmosphere.

The plant is featured on the coat of arms of Ādaži Municipality in Latvia, adopted in 2022. The endangered plant can be found in lakes within the municipality.

== Distribution ==
Lobelia dortmanna is native to cool temperate regions of northern Europe (from the British Isles and northwest France to northwest Russia) and northern North America (both coasts; Newfoundland south to New Jersey and west to the Great Lakes in the east, and British Columbia south to Oregon in the west). It reaches its northern limit in northern Norway, north of the Arctic circle.

== Ecology ==
The plant typically occurs in shallow water on sandy, peaty or rocky lakeshores, in pools, and in some kinds of wetlands. It is rarely found in rivers. Low water periods may leave it temporarily emersed, although it is sensitive to prolonged emersion and is one of the first species to be lost when water levels in lakes are artificially managed.

Lobelia dortmanna has relatively low competitive ability and tends to be restricted to areas with low plant cover and relatively low rates of sedimentation at depths of less than 1 metre. It often grows with other isoetids such as Littorella uniflora, Isoetes lacustris, Isoetes echinospora and Subularia aquatica. It is regarded as an indicator of infertile and relatively pristine shoreline wetlands. Consequently, it is a species that can be put at risk by eutrophication and is used as an indicator species of relatively clear water and the possible occurrence of other less obvious isoetid species. Such lakes are therefore often referred to as Lobelian lakes, as a specific habitat. Scientifically, such aquatic environments are designated as habitat type 3130: "Oligotrophic to mesotrophic standing waters with vegetation of the Littorelletea uniflorae and/or of the Isoëto-Nanojuncetea". In Europe, Lobelian lakes are relatively abundant in the more mountainous areas.

== Gallery ==
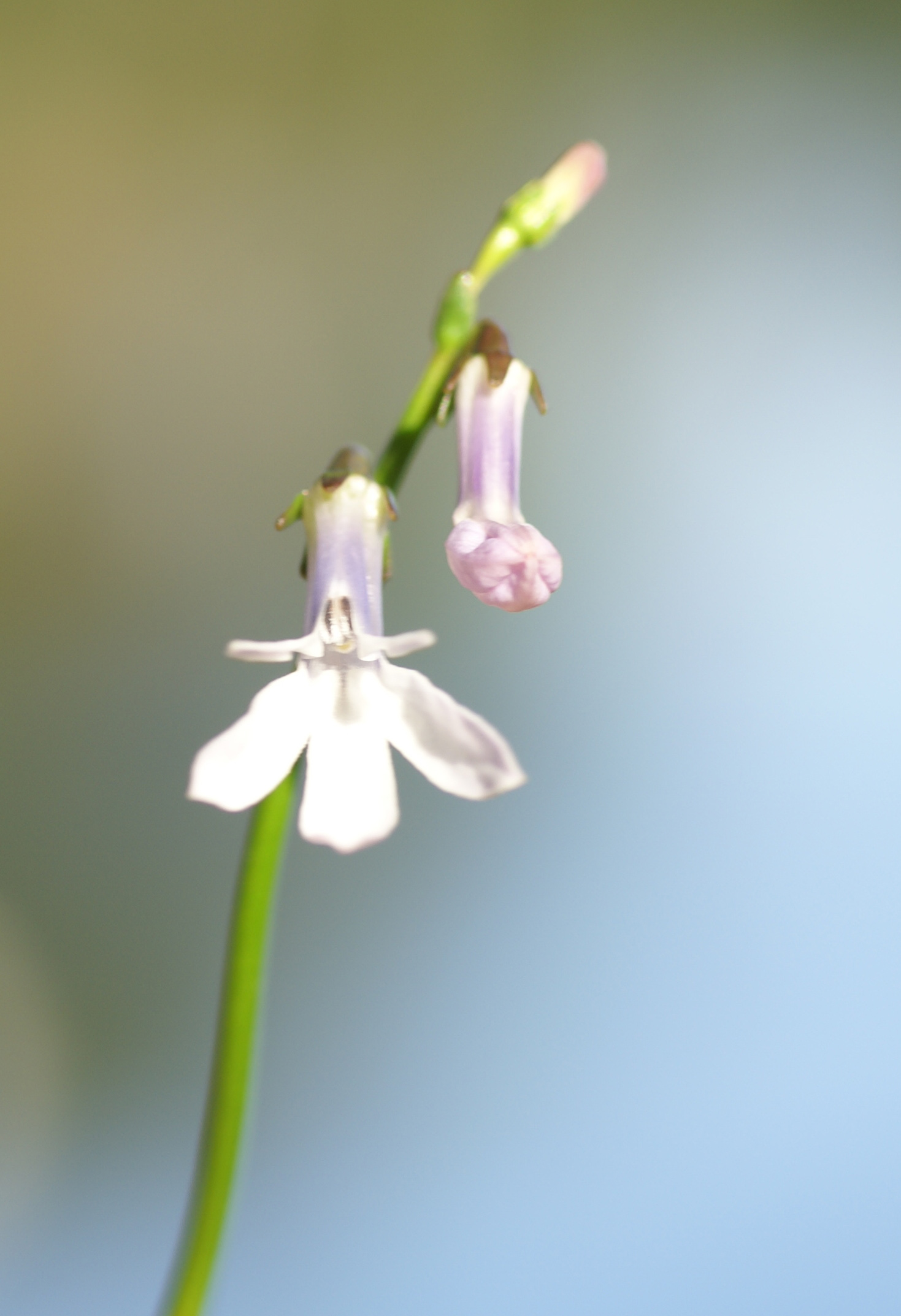
Flowers

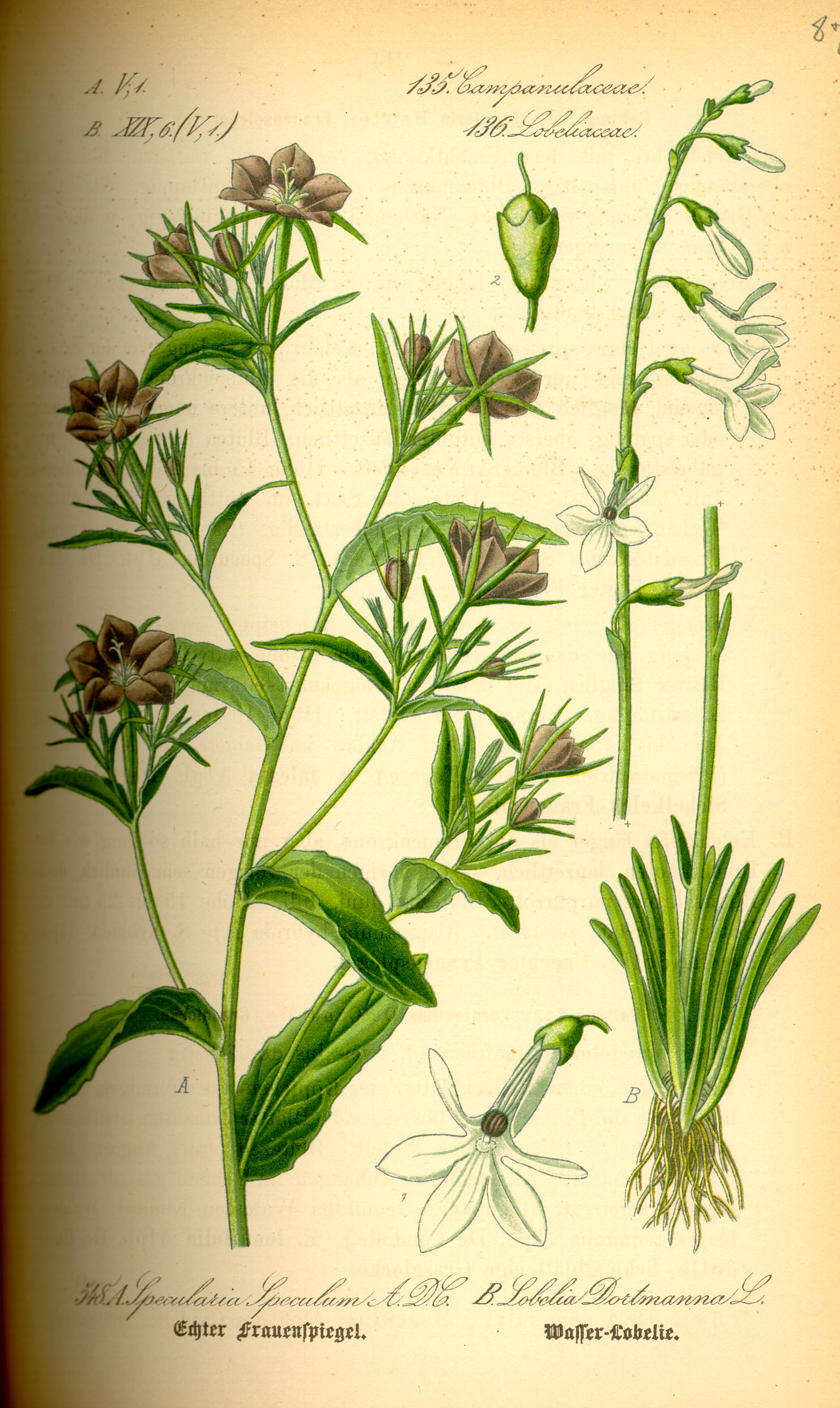
Illustration (plant on right)

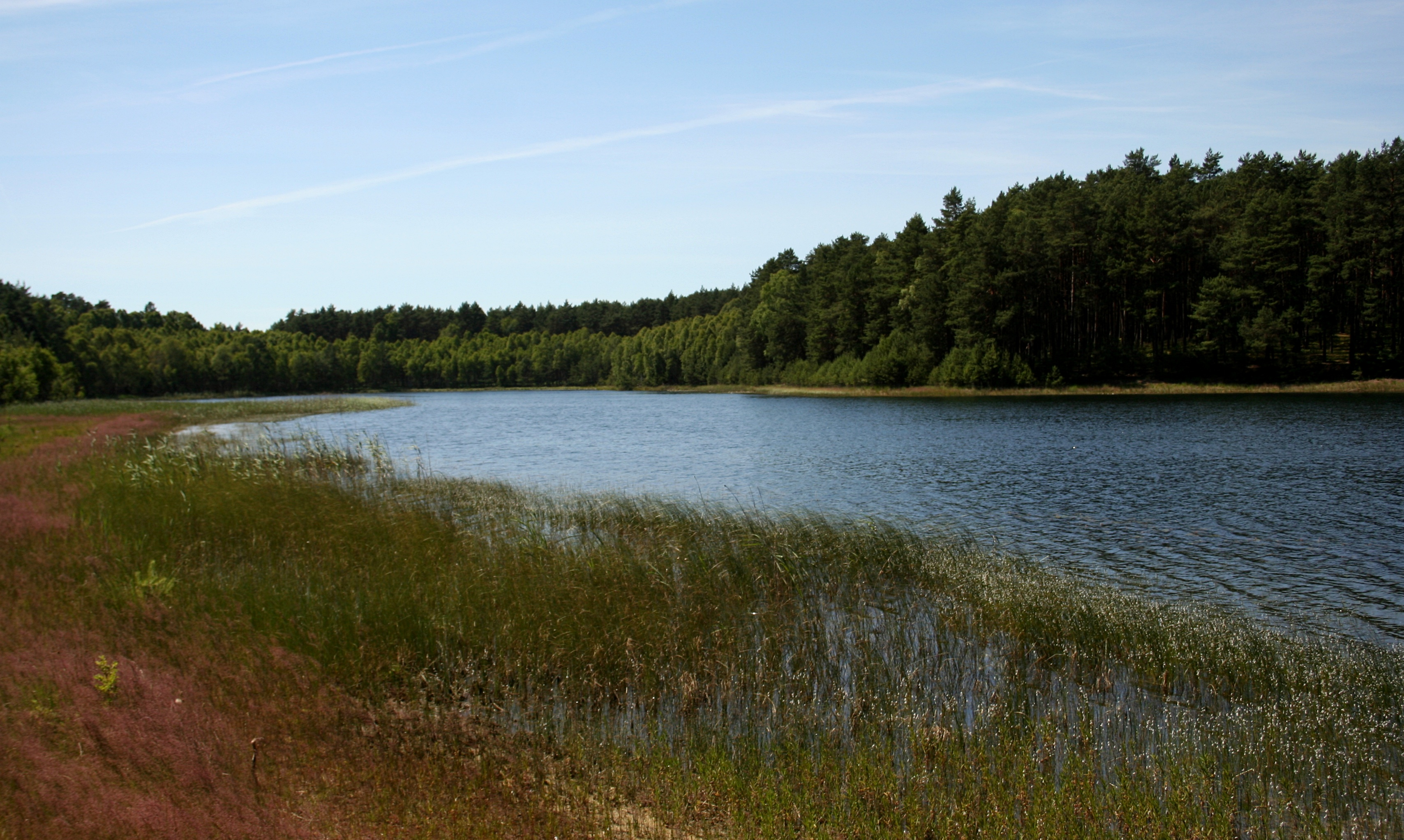
A Lobelian lake
