= Carnikava =

Town in Ādaži Municipality, Latvia

Carnikava Sānkaule
- Town
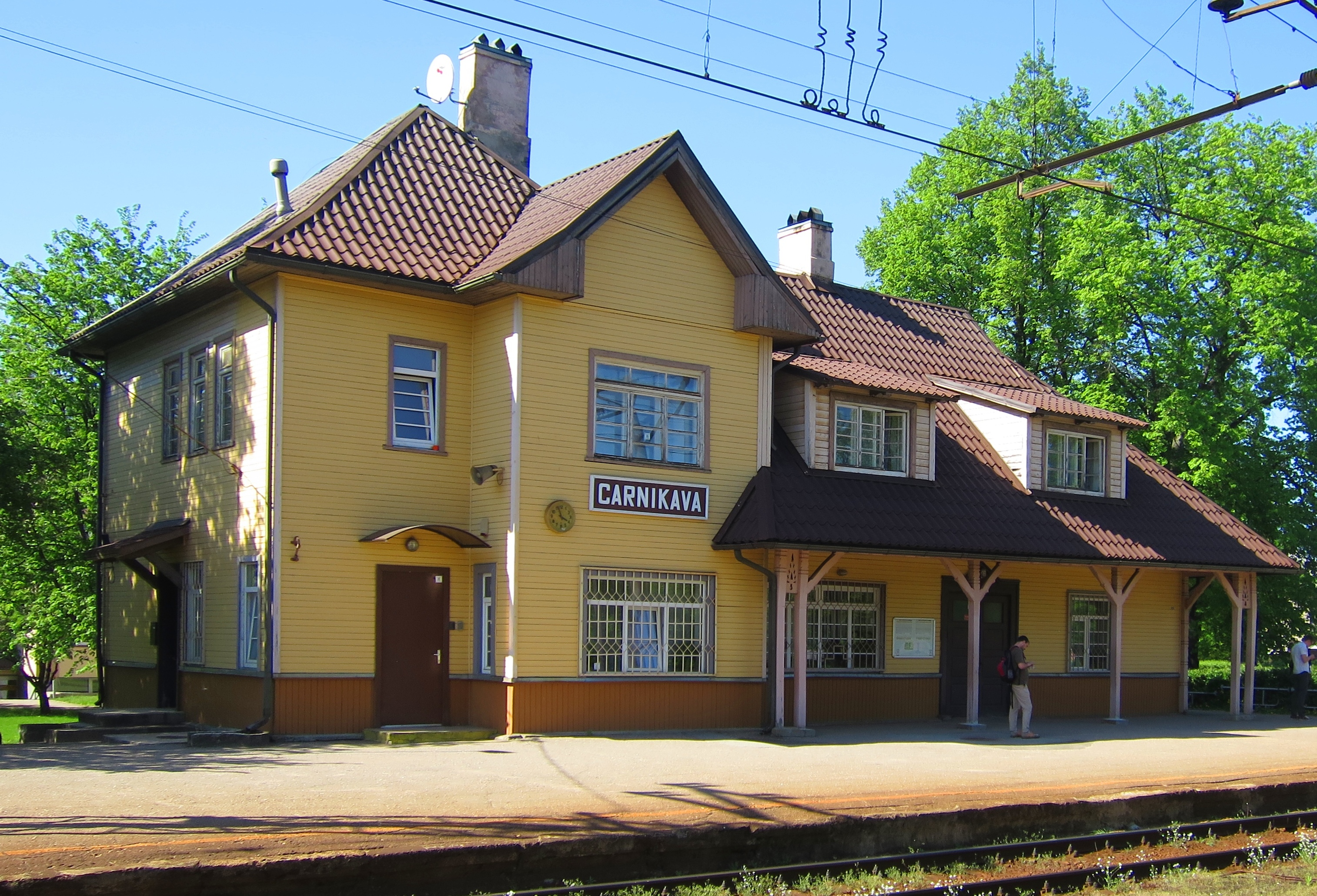
- Carnikava Railway Station in 2018

- Carnikava's location in Latvia
- Coordinates: 57°8′0″N 24°17′0″E
- Country: Latvia
- Municipality: Ādaži
- First mentioned: 1211
- City rights: 22 August 2026

Area
  - Land: 493 km^{2} (190 sq mi)
- Elevation: 6 m (20 ft)

Population (2026)
  - Total: 5,317
  - Density: 10.8/km^{2} (27.9/sq mi)
- Time zone: UTC+2 (EST)
  - Summer (DST): UTC+3 (EEST)
- Post code: LV-2163

Carnikava (Livonian: Sarnikau, German: Koivemund, Zarnikau), previously Sānkaule, is a town and the extra-territorial center of the Carnikava Parish of Ādaži Municipality in the Vidzeme region of Latvia. It's located 25 km north from Riga at the mouth of the Gauja River. Carnikava had 4689 residents as of January 2020.

On 22 August 2026, Carnikava received city/town rights. Previously it was one of the largest villages of Latvia. (see List of largest villages in Latvia).

== Etymology ==
The name Carnikava is believed to be of Livonian origin, with its earlier version Sarnikau reportedly translating as 'ash tree valley' (ošleja or ošu (ie)leja in Latvian). The contemporary Livonian words for ash tree are särn (särni in dative) or sǟrna – however, the word for 'valley' is luoik.

In German, the name Koivemund translates as 'the mouth of the Koiva (river)', with Koiva being a Finno-Ugric name of the Gauja River. Sānkaule was briefly borrowed in Latvian from one of the names of Carnikava Manor at the time by the periodical Latviešu Avīzes and Sānkeaute was used by Krišjānis Barons in his notes. In German and other languages the variations of the placename are Zarnikau, Czernekow etc.

== History ==
The area was first mentioned in Livonian Chronicle of Henry in 1211 as a summoning place of Livonian troops under the name of Coywemunde or Coiwemunde. Later Carnikava grew around Carnikava (Zarnikau, Meņģele) Manor into a fishermen village, where reportedly in the 1880 the first breeding fishery and canned fish factory in the Russian Empire was established. Due to its proximity to the Baltic Sea, several forest lakes, the Gauja and annual fishermen and craftsmanship fairs, nowadays Carnikava is a popular summer resort among visitors from Riga.

Heinz Christian Pander (1794–1865), researcher of biology, embryology and paleontology, lived and worked in Carnikava in his estate. The Carnikava Manor palace, built in its modern form in the late 17th century, was destroyed by Russian soldiers in a fire in the autumn of 1917 around the time of the Riga offensive, with the ruins ultimately demolished by the Soviet occupational authorities in the 1960s to make way for a Soviet military cemetery. Today, a column chapiter in the middle of a park in the center of Carnikava marks the heritage of the manor.

Until 1992, most of the Carnikava Parish was a part of Ādaži Parish, with its western part included in Mangaļi Parish until after World War II, when it was abolished and split between Riga's Mangaļi neighbourhood and Ādaži Parish. In 1992, Carnikava Parish split from Ādaži Parish, with both being parts of the Riga district until 2009, when districts were abolished and a separate Carnikava Municipality was created. Ultimately, it was merged into the new Ādaži Municipality as Carnikava Parish in 2021.

Discussions about the status of the growing village led to a push to designate Carnikava as a city/town, with former Carnikava Municipality chair and then-Speaker of the Saeima, Daiga Mieriņa, submitting a bill, which was designated as urgent by and advanced out of the Saeima's State Administration and Local Government Committee on 15 July 2026. The bill, as a part of the amendments to the Law on Administrative Territories and Populated Areas, was then approved by the Saeima on 23 July and went into force from 22 August 2026. The date coincided with the annual Carnikava Lamprey Festival.

The authors of the bill said that town rights would strengthen Carnikava’s identity and competitiveness, promote investment and business development potential, and improve the planning of public services, for instance, having a chance to apply for funding for the installation of more environmentally friendly heating solutions in single-family houses, which is not available to villages.

== Culture ==
A notable symbol and long-time culinary specialty of Carnikava has been grilled river lamprey, which is also pictured on the coat of arms of Carnikava Parish and the former Carnikava Municipality. Lamprey caught and/or prepared in Carnikava was awarded the Protected Geographical Indication seal of the European Union in 2015 and is included into the Latvian Intangible Cultural Heritage list since 2019. Since 2001 or 2002, an annual Lamprey Festival (Latvian: Nēģu svētki) is held in Carnikava on the third Saturday of August to mark the first haul of lamprey after the start of the season on August 1.

== Notable people from Carnikava Parish and the town ==
- Johann August Leberecht Albanus (1765–1839), lutheran pastor of Daugavgrīva parish, censor, rector of the Riga Cathedral School, director of the Vidzeme Provincial Gymnasium
- Anna Auziņa (b. 1975), poet
- Ludmila Azarova (1935–2012), journalist and poet, lived at 15 Cīrulīšu Street, wife of Ojārs Vācietis
- Lūcija Baumane (1905–1988), actress, theater director and drama teacher, lived in Kalngale
- Reinholds Bernhards (1879–1937), first and last commander of the Latvian SSR Navy in 1919, ocean-going captain, hydrologist, meteorologist and geographer of Polynesia
- Friedrich Christoph Brosse (1773–1827), pseudonym Ernst Bonsen, pastor of Kalngale parish, writer, professor at Moscow University, publisher of the monthly magazine "Ruthenia"
- Augusts Ludvigs Otomārs Drēziņš (b. 1899 in Drunkas Nagaiņi, Carnikava, died 1983 in Sydney), Latvian-Australian painter
- Ilmārs Reinholds Drēziņš (1930–2022), civil engineer, longtime construction industry expert, recipient of Cross of Recognition(2020)
- Jēkabs Aleksandrs Dzenis (1893–1979), board member of the "Laima" joint-stock company, recipient of the Lāčplēsis Military Order
- Heinrihs Gēgingers (also Heinrich Goegginger, b. 1875 in Riga, d. 1943 in Lissa, Germany) - Baltic German industrialist, last owner of Carnikava Manor
- Eduards Grantskalns (b. 1881 in Lode, d. 1964 in New Jersey, USA), member of the Constitutional Assembly of Latvia, member of the 1st to 4th Saeima, owner of the model farm "Ruthenia", recipient of the Order of the Three Stars (1933)
- Modris Ģelzis (1929–2009), architect
- Gunārs Freimanis (1927–1993), poet and victim of KGB repressions
- Aleksandrs Jaunbērzs (1882–1969), member of the Constitutional Assembly of Latvia, chairman of Riga County Council, lived in Laveri with his grandson Andris Ruģēns
- Ramons Kepe (1932–2013), opera singer
- Rita Kukaine (1922–2011), microbiologist, director of the Institute of Microbiology of the Latvian Academy of Sciences
- Vilis Lācis (Jānis Vilhelms Lāce, 1904–1966), Latvian Soviet collaborator, writer, chairman of the Council of People's Commissars (the Cabinet) of the Latvian SSR, summer resident of the "Dīķi" household near present-day Vaļu Street in Garciems
- Visvaldis Lāms (1923–1992), writer
- Anrijs Matīss, former Minister of Transport of Latvia
- Māra Marnauza (b. 1963), choral conductor
- Baroness Julia von Mengden (1719–1787), politician of the Russian Empire, favorite and mistress of Empress regent Anna Leopoldovna
- Ernst Reinhold von Mengden (1726–1798), Reichsgraf of the Holy Roman Empire, court chief chamberlain of the Russian Empire, jurist, landrat, state councillor
- Fridericus Menius (1593–1659), jurist, historian, professor at the University of Tartu, alchemist, first to publish Latvian folk songs in print.
- Zigurds Neimanis, stage and voice actor
- Jāzeps Osmanis (1932–2014), poet
- Miķelis Voldemārs Pētersons (1893–1977), recipient of the Lāčplēsis Military Order
- Jēkabs Prīmanis (1892–1971), anthropologist
- Andris Ruģēns (b. 1936), engineer and politician
- Valdis Skuja (1933–2018), painter
- Melānija Vanaga (1905–1997), Latvian writer and historian, lived in Carnikava
- Mārtiņš Vācietis (1897–1963), Latvian military officer and general, born in Carnikava
- Ojārs Vācietis (1933–1983), poet, lived at 15 Cīrulīšu Street with his wife, Ludmila Azarova
- Alvis Vītoliņš (1946—1997), chess master
- Toms Skujiņš (b. 1991), cyclist, olympian
- Vilhelms Zābers (1862–1938), teacher and chairman of the former Riga County Council
