= Ādaži =

Town and capital of Ādaži Municipality, Latvia

- Town
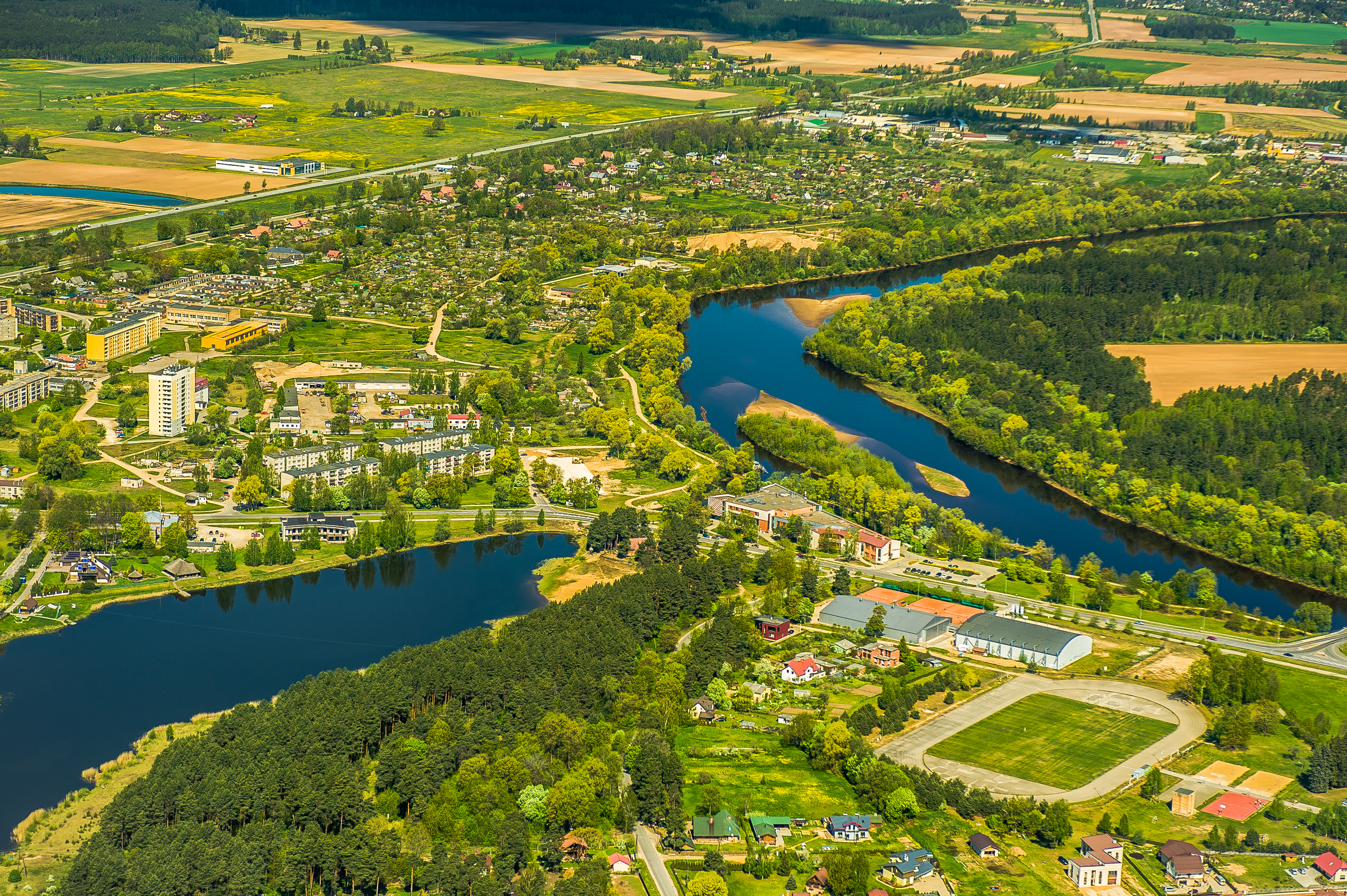
- Panorama of Ādaži

- Location in Latvia
- Coordinates: 57°04′37″N 24°19′25″E
- Country: Latvia
- Municipality: Ādaži Municipality
- First mention: 1204
- City rights: 1 July 2022

Area
  - Total: 8.8 km^{2} (3.4 sq mi)

Population (2017)
  - Total: 6,734
- Time zone: UTC+2 (EET)
  - Summer (DST): UTC+3 (EEST)
- Postal code: LV-2164
- Website: Ādaži official site

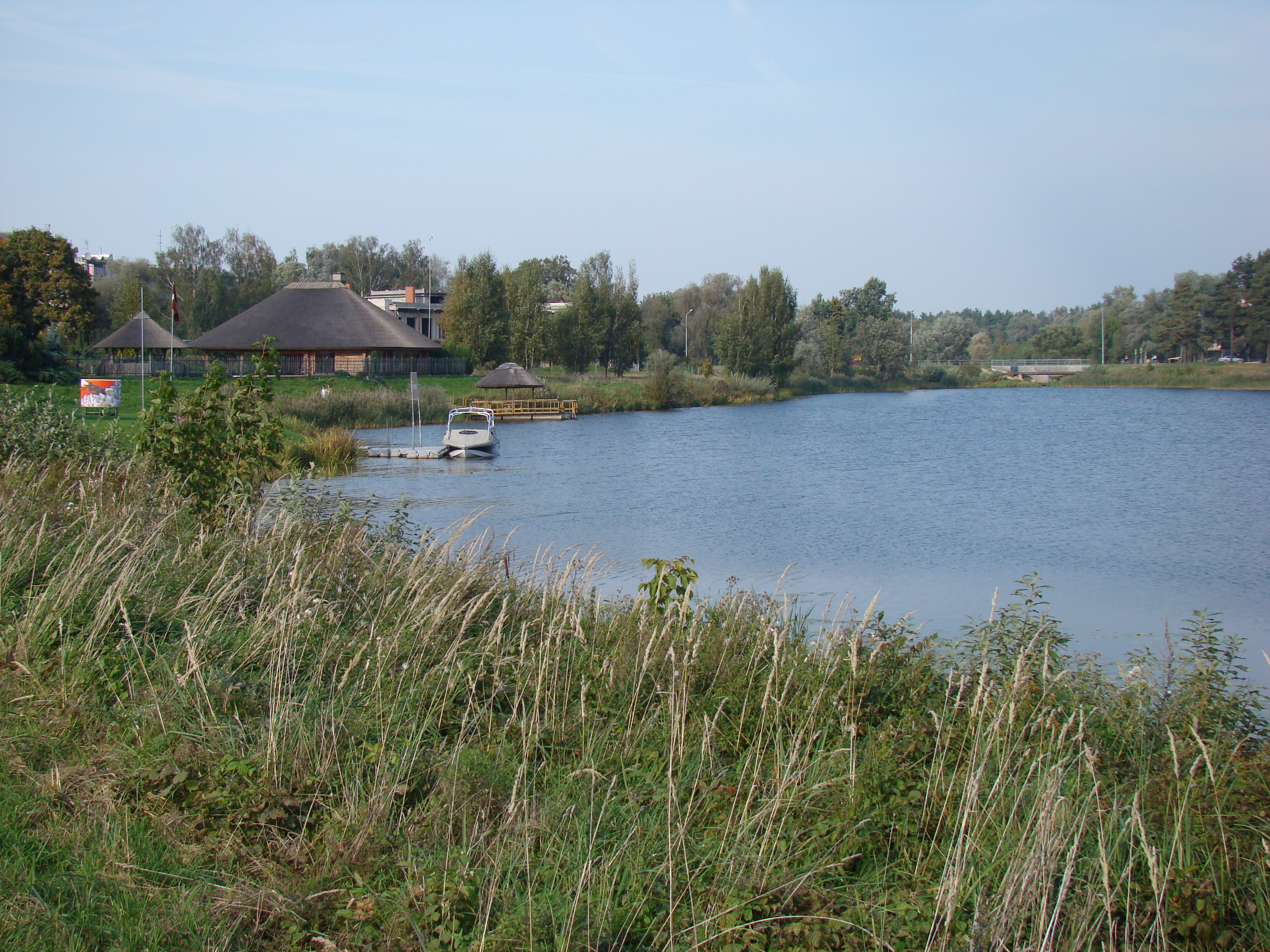
Gauja river in Ādaži

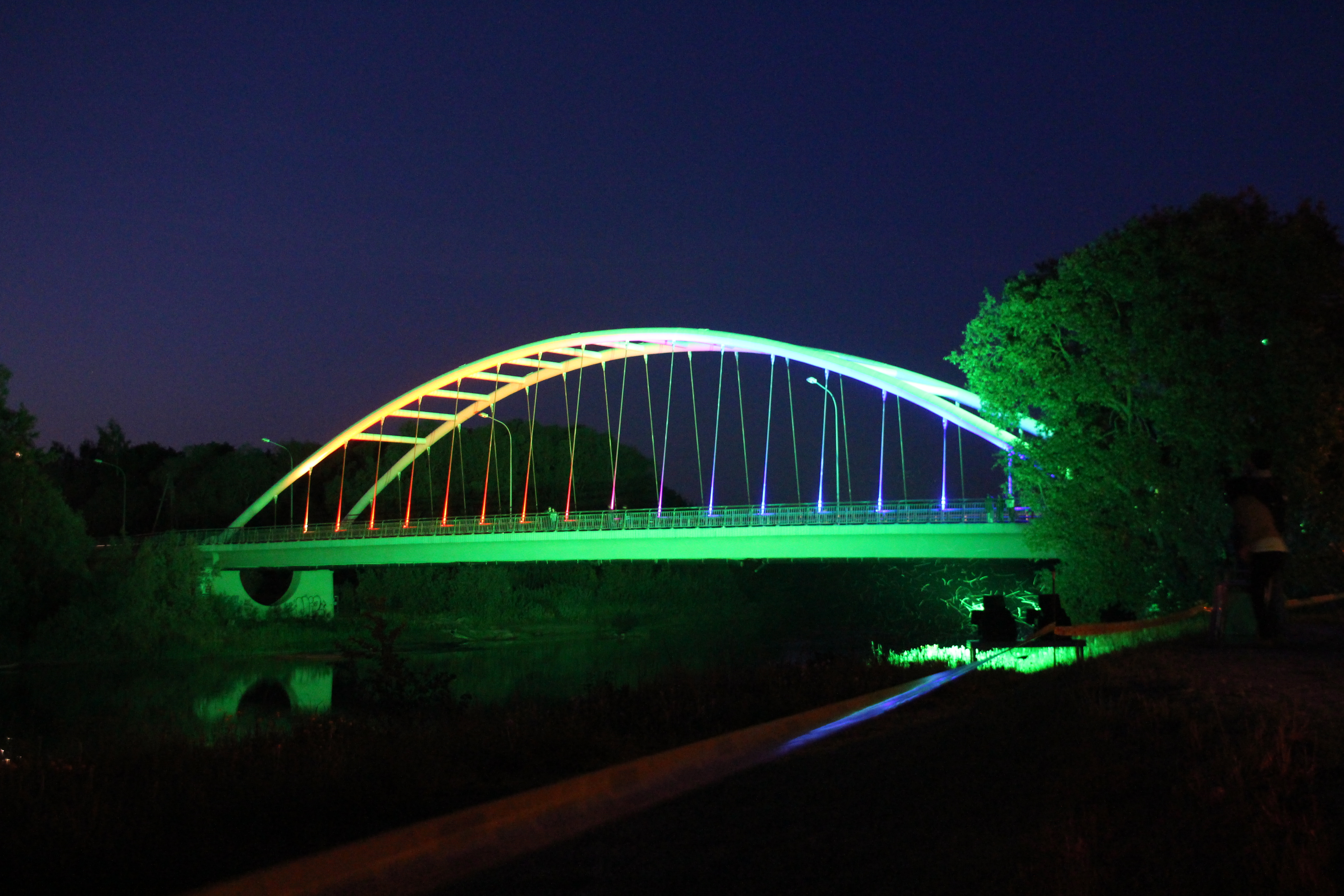
Bridge over the River Gauja in Ādaži

Ādaži ([ˈaː.da.ʒi]) (formerly German: Aahof) is a town in Pierīga, on the left bank of the Gauja river. The town is the administrative center of Ādaži Municipality, in the Vidzeme region of Latvia, as well as the extraterritorial seat of its Ādaži Parish. It is located by the highway A1, 21.6 km from the center of Riga. Latvia's longest river, the Gauja, flows along the Ādaži River, and its tributary Vējupe divides the town into two parts.

The town is sometimes popularly known due to the nearby Latfood factory producing Ādažu Čipsi, the best known potato chip brand in Latvia, as well as the home of the largest military base in the country. Ādaži also has an eponymous wakeboarding club on the Gauja.

Ādaži has administrative offices, schools (Ādaži Elementary School, Ādaži Secondary School, and Ādaži Free Waldorf School), Kindergarten Strautiņš, several shops (Maxima, Rimi, Elvi) and service companies.

== History ==
The castle of Novum Molendinum (Neuermühlen) located in the Bukulti and Baltezers areas, has been documented since at least 1204. Here, the Battle of Neuermühlen took place in 1492. After the battle the Bishop of Riga had to recognize the Teutonic Order as Overlord of Livonia.

The modern town of Ādaži is formed around the center of the former Gauja Manor (Aahof) or the Gauja-Pļava Manor, but the newest part of the village, Vējupe - around the center of the Remberģu Manor (Ringenberg). In the 19th century, it was called Ādaži-Carnikava Parish.

According to the provisions of the 2021 Latvian administrative reform, Ādaži gained city rights (town status) on 1 July 2022.

== Military installations ==
The largest military base of the Latvian National Armed Forces – called Camp Ādaži, Kadaga Military Base or Ādaži Military Base (Latvian: Ādažu poligons or Ādažu militārā bāze) – is located in the village of Kadaga, across the river from Ādaži. Although the base itself appeared during the Soviet occupation of Latvia, the Ādaži Training Area or 'polygon' (also called the Kadaga, Gauja and Lilaste Polygon at various times) north of the base was first established by the Latvian Armed Forces in 1927.

In September 2016, Latvia's then-Defense Minister Raimonds Bergmanis said that infrastructure at the base was "being constructed and modernized at a fast pace" in preparation for a Canadian-led 1,500 strong multinational NATO battalion expected to deploy to Latvia in the spring of 2017.

== Transportation ==
Ādaži's location on the A1 road (Latvia), which is part of Via Baltica's international highway, favors transit and transport industries.

== See also ==
- Ādaži Protected Landscape
