= Ādaži Municipality =

Municipality of Latvia

Coordinates: 57°04′N 24°20′E

Ādaži Municipality Ādažu novads
- Municipality
- Flag Coat of arms

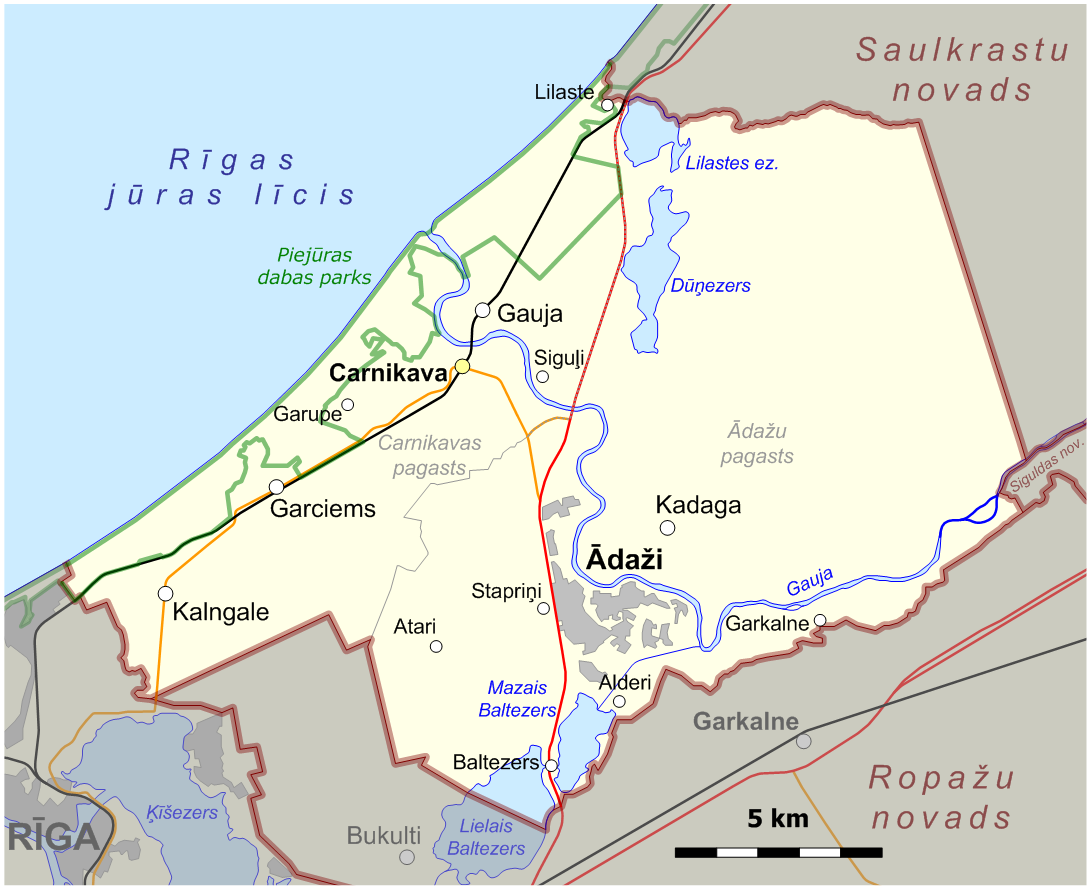
- Country: Latvia
- Formed: 2006
- Reformed: 2021
- Centre: Ādaži
- Subdivisions: List: Ādaži Carnikava Ādaži Parish Carnikava Parish

Government
  - Council Chair: Gatis Miglāns (LZS/ZZS)

Area
  - Total: 243.32 km^{2} (93.95 sq mi)
  - Land: 224.25 km^{2} (86.58 sq mi)
  - Water: 243.32224 km^{2} (93.94724 sq mi)

Population (2026)
  - Total: 24,141
  - Density: 107.65/km^{2} (278.82/sq mi)
- Website: adazunovads.lv

Ādaži Municipality (Latvian: Ādažu novads) is a municipality in the historical region of Vidzeme, and the Riga Planning Region in Latvia, which consists of Ādaži and Carnikava parishes plus the town of Carnikava and the administrative centre, the town of Ādaži. The municipality is located 25 km from the center of Riga.

The municipality was first created in 2006 from the Ādaži Parish of Riga district and became a first level unit in 2009. After the 2021 administrative reform, Carnikava Municipality was merged into Ādaži Municipality. On 1 July 2022, the village of Ādaži received town rights, and Carnikava followed on 22 August 2026.

== Description ==
=== Geography ===
Prior to 2021, the municipality consisted of the following villages: Alderi, Atari, Āņi, Baltezers, Birznieki, Garkalne, Kadaga, Stapriņi, Divezeri, Iļķene, Eimuri. The largest of them were Ādaži, Kadaga, Baltezers, Garkalne and Stapriņi. The total area is 162.9 km2.

A large part of the territory of Ādaži municipality consists of the Ādaži military training ground of the Latvian National Armed Forces. A notable geographical feature is the Gauja River, which flows into the Gulf of Riga within the borders of the municipality.

=== History and society ===
The Ādaži Parish had been a historical municipal unit before – since at least the 1860s – and throughout the 20th century. The present borders of the unit were created in 1992 after the separation of Carnikava Parish.

The municipality is known for its natural sights (e.g. the Piejūra Seaside Nature Park, which spans the entire length of the municipality's coastline), fishing and culinary traditions (the catching of fish and river lamprey, celebrated each August at the Carnikava Lamprey Festival) and others.

The population is on the rise, reaching 12,000 at the beginning of 2020 in Ādaži and Ādaži Parish. The enlarged municipality in 2023 had a population of nearly 22,800 people.

== Symbols ==
After the formation of the new municipality, a process to design a new coat of arms was launched in 2021. The previous coats of arms were re-used for both of the new parishes since 27 December 2021. Eventually, a design by Edgars Sims was selected, featuring the mouth of the Gauja River (in a pattern similar to the Latvian letter Ā) on a silver field and the Lobelia dortmanna (a flower common in the lakes of Ummis and Mazuika but otherwise endangered in Latvia) in silver and gold. The design was approved on 27 January 2022, making Ādaži the first newly created municipality to have approved a coat of arms.

The previous coat of arms of Ādaži Municipality was approved on 28 March 2012, by the decision of the Ministry of Culture of the Republic of Latvia No.3.1.-4/13. It was based on the coat of arms of Ādaži Parish approved on 29 July 1998, and registered in the Coat of Arms Register. It consisted of a green water lily leaf in a silver field, a white water rose flower in natural colors in the center and a green thread border. The symbol of Ādaži municipality indicated the Gauja river and the flora characteristic of the territory of the municipality. The white color of the water rose located in the center symbolizes clarity, wisdom, courage and support.

Coat of arms of Ādaži Parish (1998–2009, since 2021)

Coat of arms of Carnikava Parish (since 2021, similar design 2002–2021)

Coat of arms of Ādaži Municipality (2012–2021)

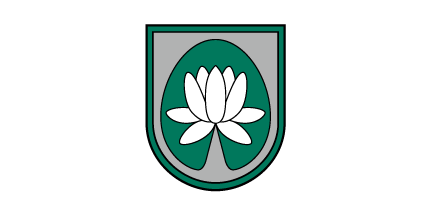
Flag of Ādaži Municipality (2012–2021)

== Notable people ==
- Carl Hugo Hahn (1818 in Ādaži – 1895), a Baltic German missionary and linguist, worked in South West Africa
- Sergejs Mirskis (born 1952 in Ādaži), politician, deputy of the 10th, 11th and 12th Saeima.

== See also ==
- Administrative divisions of Latvia
