= Ādaži Parish =

Parish in Ādaži Municipality, Latvia

- parish of Latvia
- Coat of arms

- Coordinates: 57°04′N 24°20′E
- Country: Latvia

Area
  - Total: 152.18 km^{2} (58.76 sq mi)
  - Land: 139.07 km^{2} (53.70 sq mi)
  - Water: 13.11 km^{2} (5.06 sq mi)

Population (1 January 2025)
  - Total: 5,458
  - Density: 39.25/km^{2} (101.6/sq mi)

Ādaži Parish (Latvian: Ādažu pagasts) is an administrative unit of Ādaži Municipality, Latvia. The administrative center of the parish is the town of Ādaži, which itself is located outside its borders. The parish was initially established in 1866 as a part of Riga county. It was abolished by Soviet occupational authorities from 1949 to 1990. Two years later, in 1992, the seaside area of Ādaži Parish near Carnikava split off to form Carnikava Parish and later Carnikava Municipality.

== Villages of Ādaži parish ==
In terms of population, the largest village in the parish in 2022 was Kadaga, with 2,362 inhabitants. Kadaga is the location of the headquarters of the largest military area in Latvia - the NAF Ādaži Military Base.

In total, the parish consists of 12 villages (3 large villages, 3 medium villages, 1 small village, 1 summer cottage village, and 6 sparsely populated villages), most of which are located along the A1 state highway "Rīga–Ainaži" (Baltezers and Kadaga). Over the last 10–20 years, three new villages (Birznieki, Eimuri, and Stapriņi) have developed near the center of Ādaži. The village of Alderi is separated from the nearby town of Ādaži by the Gauja–Baltezers Canal. The village of Atari is located in the western part of Ādaži Parish. Iļķene and Āņi are situated on the eastern side of the parish, separated from each other by the Gauja River. Near Iļķene and Āņi is Garkalne.

The largest settlements are primarily located in the central and southern parts of the parish.
