= Riga Planning Region =

Planning region of Latvia

Riga Region
- Planning Region
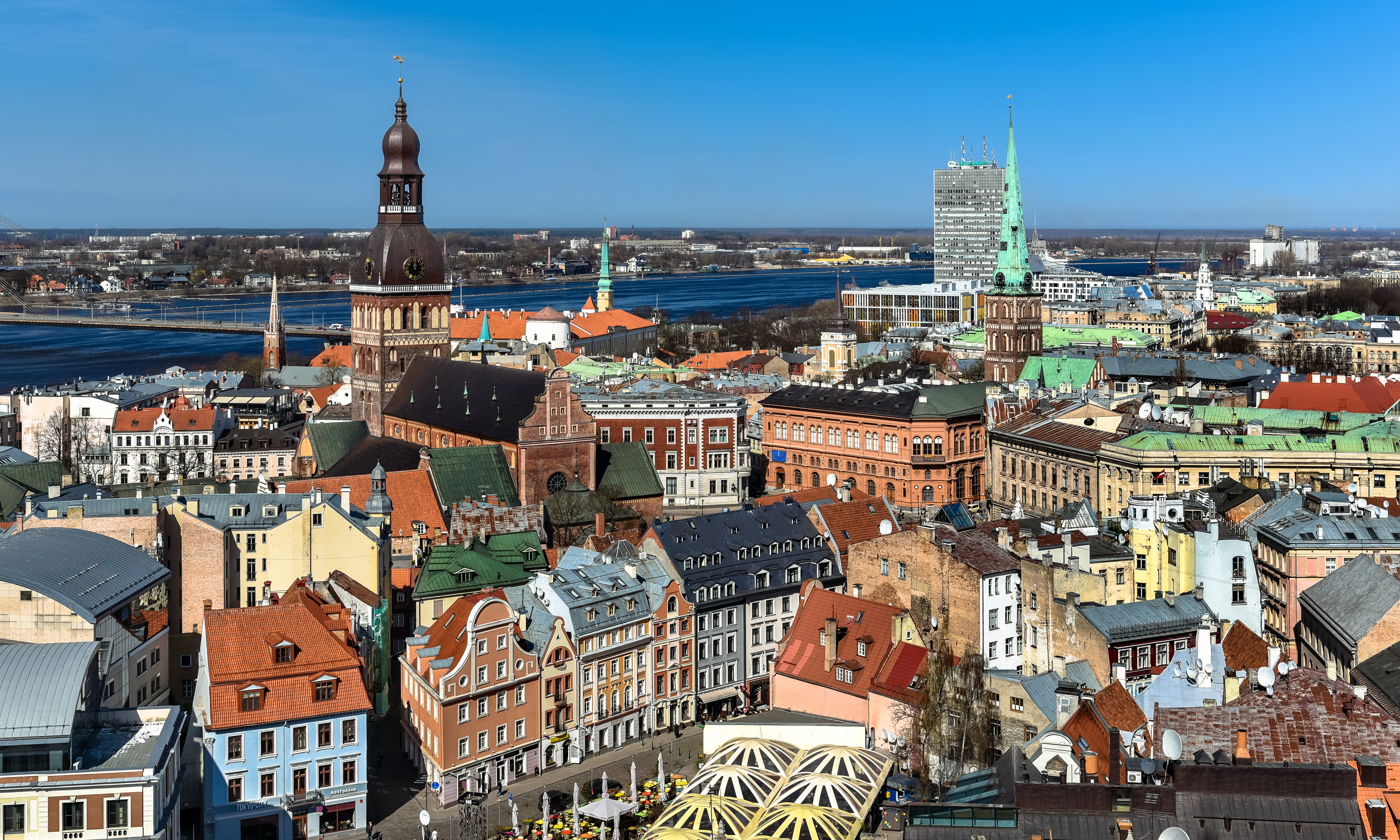
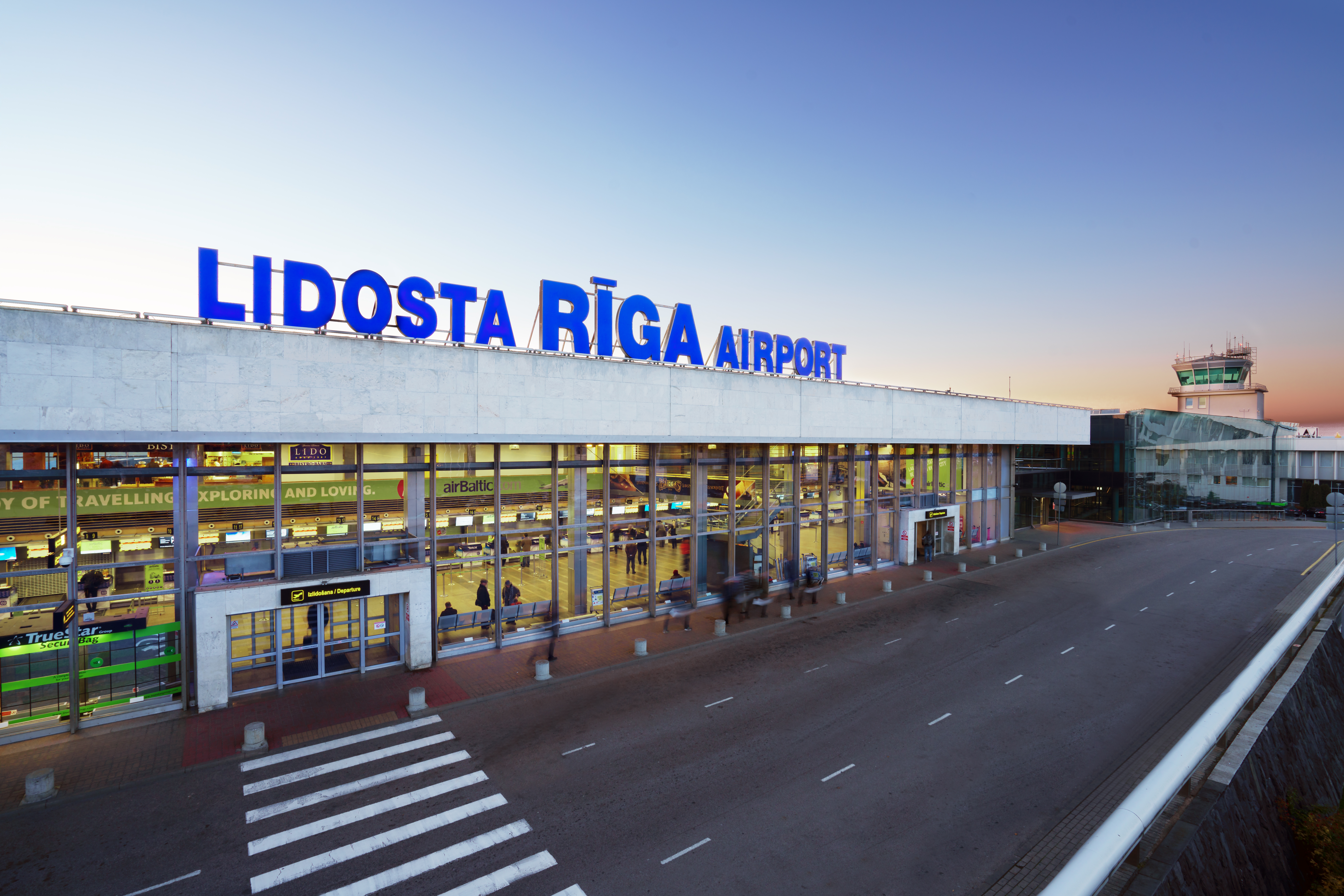
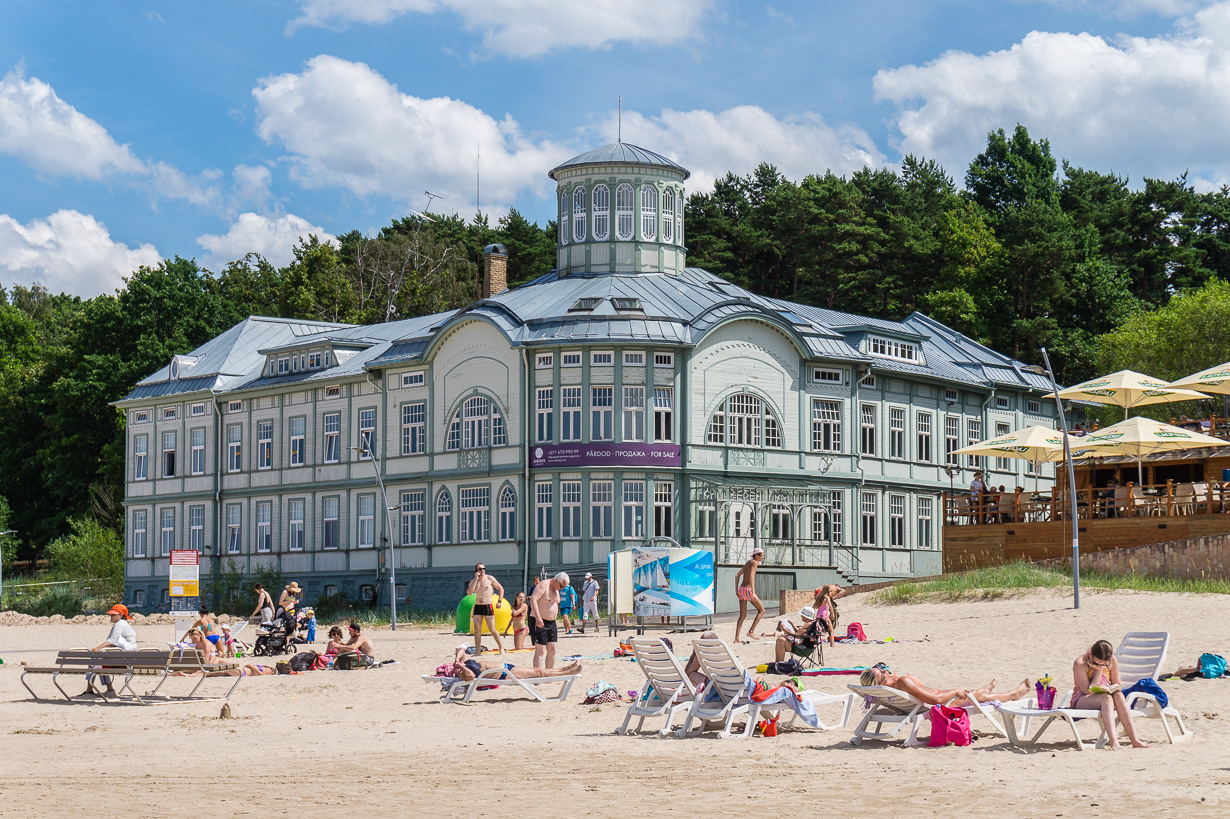
- Riga old town; Riga International Airport in Mārupe Municipality; Jūrmala resort town

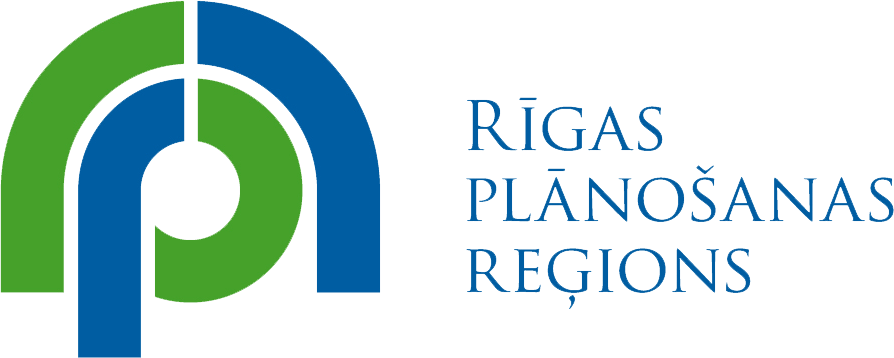
- Logo

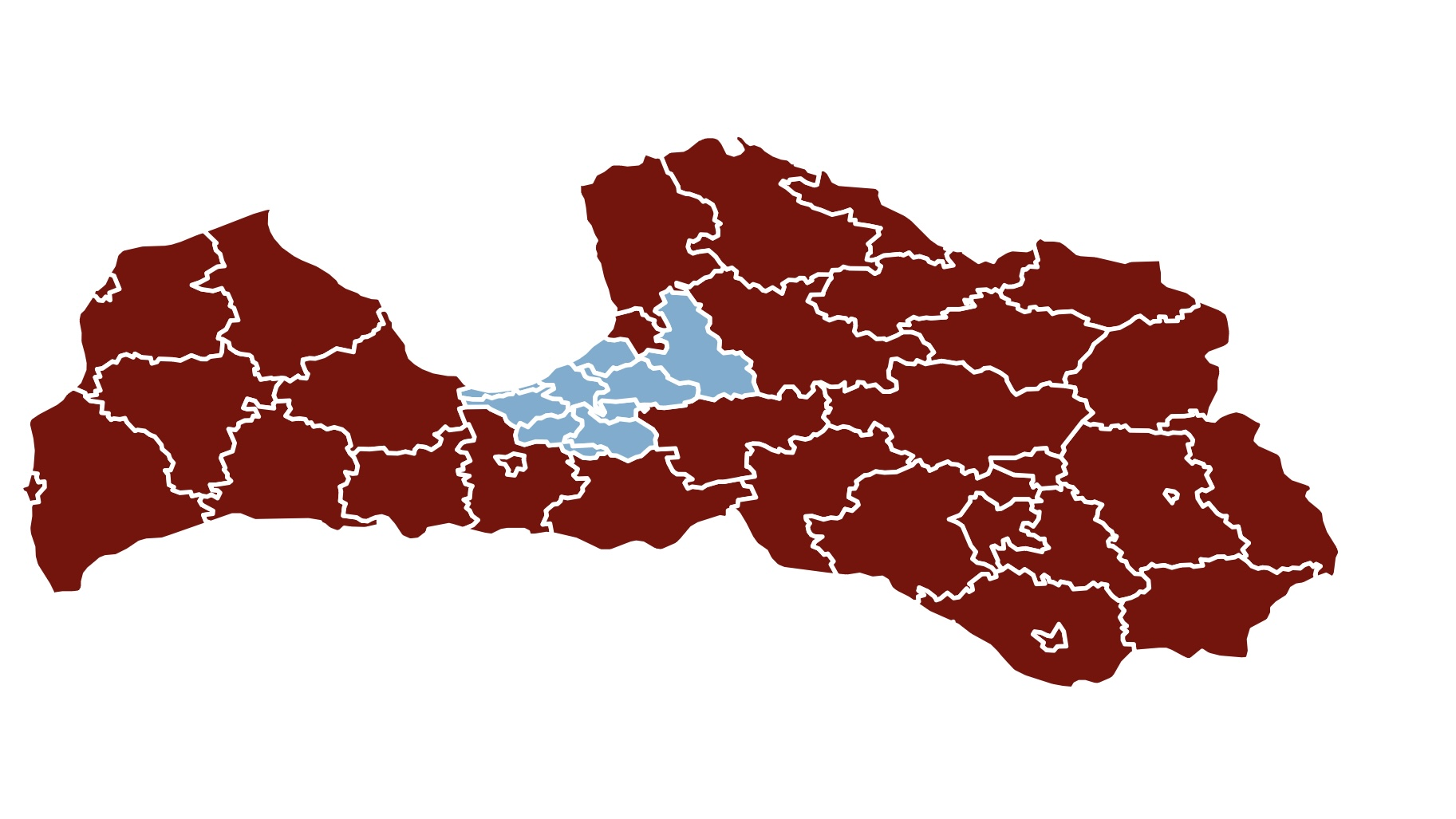
- Riga Planning Region (in blue)
- Coordinates: 57°0′0″N 24°0′0″E
- Country: Latvia

Area
  - Total: 3,158 km^{2} (1,219 sq mi)

Population (2025)
  - Total: 847,162
  - Density: 268.3/km^{2} (694.8/sq mi)

GDP
  - Total: €26.05 billion (US$30.81 billion) (2023)
  - Per capita: €30,440 (US$36,001.39) (2023)
- HDI (2022): 0.937 very high · 1st
- Website: rpr.gov.lv

Riga Region (Latvian: Rīgas reģions), officially Riga Planning Region (Latvian: Rīgas plānošanas reģions) and shortened as RPR is one of five planning regions of Latvia, situated in the central part of Latvia, in and around the metropolis of Riga and along the shores of the Gulf of Riga. The state institution was founded on 12 October 2006, based on the creation of the region territory as prescribed by Regulations No. 133 of the Cabinet of Ministers as of 25 March 2003, the "Regulations on Territories of Planning Regions". After the 2021 reform, some of the Riga Region's lands were incorporated into Kurzeme and Vidzeme.

== Organisation ==
According to the "Law on Regional Development Riga Planning Region", Riga Region is supervised by the Ministry of Regional Development and Local Government, the decision-making authority is Riga Planning Region Development Council (RPRDC), which consists of 18 deputies appointed by the heads of the local municipalities comprising the region.

== Geography ==
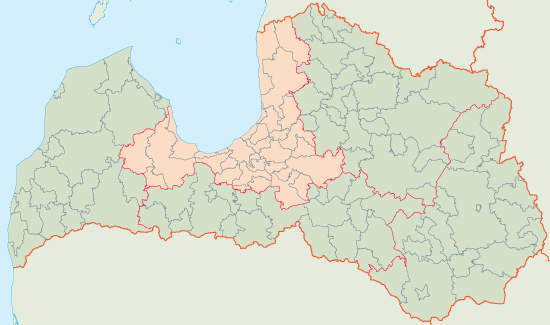
Former territory of RPP

The Riga Region was created in 2006, covering the territory and using the administrative boundaries of the now defunct districts of Latvia: Limbaži, Ogre, Riga and Tukums as well as the cities of Riga and Jūrmala. However after reforms the region consisted of 28 municipalities and 2 republican cities with an area of 10,430.1 km², a radius of over 100 km (62 mi) in the case of Ainaži in the North. Statistically it combined the city and Pierīga.

The region was reduced threefold during the second reforms on 1 July 2021 with multiple municipalities ceded to bordering regions.

== Demography ==
Around half of the Latvian population lives in Riga Region, which makes it the second largest region in the Baltic states after Vilnius County.

== Economy ==
In 2021, Riga Region had GDP of €21.3 billion of which €17.6 billion was in Riga city.

== Administrative divisions ==
Subdivision	Area km^{2}	Population	GDP	GDP per capita
Riga	304	609,489	€17,648 million	€28,943
Jūrmala	101	51,158	€504 million	€10,002
Sigulda Municipality	1030	31,304	€379 million	€12,345
Ķekava Municipality	444	31,143	€577 million	€19,030
Salaspils Municipality	123	23,451	€245 million	€10,664
Ādaži Municipality	243	22,759	€241 million	€11,208
Mārupe Municipality	104	21,577	€1,016 million	€30,248
Olaine Municipality	309	20,505	€290 million	€14,629
Ropaži Municipality	325	6,836	€758 million	€23,416
Riga Planning Region	3,158	860,142	€21,313 million	€25,033

== See also ==
- Planning regions of Latvia
- Administrative divisions of Latvia
