= Stopiņi Municipality =

Municipality of Latvia

Coordinates: 56°56′N 24°17′E

Stopiņi Municipality Stopiņu novads
- Municipality
- Flag Coat of arms

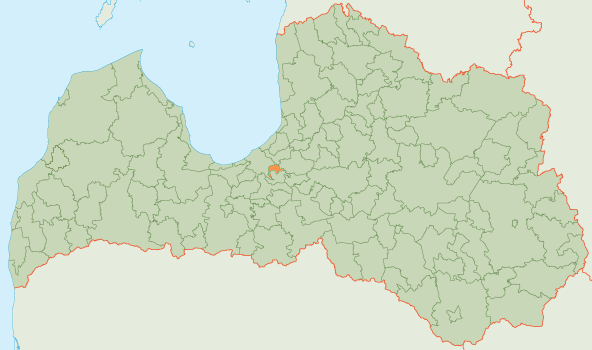
- Country: Latvia
- Formed: 2005
- Dissolved: 2021
- Centre: Ulbroka

Government
  - Council Chair: Vita Paulāne (LRA)

Area
  - Total: 53.46 km^{2} (20.64 sq mi)
  - Land: 51.48 km^{2} (19.88 sq mi)
  - Water: 1.98 km^{2} (0.76 sq mi)

Population (2021)
  - Total: 12,201
  - Density: 237.0/km^{2} (613.8/sq mi)
- Website: www.stopini.lv

Stopiņi Municipality (Latvian: Stopiņu novads) is a former municipality in the historical region of Vidzeme, and the Riga Planning Region in Latvia. The municipality was formed in 2005 through the reorganization of Stopiņi Parish, the administrative centre being Ulbroka. The municipality consisted of the following villages and settlements: Ulbroka, Saurieši, Upeslejas, Dreiliņi, Vālodzes, Līči, Dzidriņas, Rumbula and Cekule. The population in 2020 was 11,458.

On 1 July 2021, Stopiņi Municipality ceased to exist and its territory was merged with Ropaži Municipality as Stopiņi Parish.

The municipality derived its name from the estate Stopenhof, founded in the area in the 16th century by the city doctor of Riga, Zacharias Stopius. The coat of arms of the municipality also incorporates parts from the coat of art of Zacharias Stopius.

The only IKEA store in Latvia was completed here in July 2018.

== See also ==
- Administrative divisions of Latvia
