= Garkalne Municipality =

Former municipality of Latvia

Coordinates: 57°02′51″N 24°25′14″E

Garkalne Municipality Garkalnes novads
- Municipality
- Flag Coat of arms

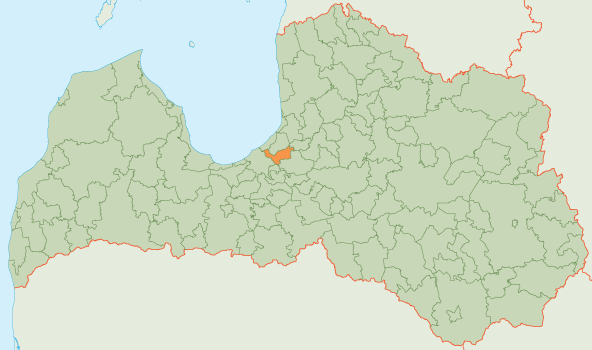
- Country: Latvia
- Formed: 2007
- Dissolved: 2021
- Centre: Berģi (extraterritorially)

Government
  - Council Chair (last): Alvis Zīriņš (S)

Area
  - Total: 152.50 km^{2} (58.88 sq mi)
  - Land: 142.81 km^{2} (55.14 sq mi)
  - Water: 9.69 km^{2} (3.74 sq mi)

Population (2021)
  - Total: 9,425
  - Density: 66.00/km^{2} (170.9/sq mi)
- Website: www.garkalne.lv

Garkalne Municipality (Latvian: Garkalnes novads) was a municipality in Vidzeme, Latvia. The municipality was formed in 2007 by reorganization of Garkalne Parish of Riga district. The seat of the council of the municipality was situated outside the municipality in Berģi, Riga. The population in 2020 was 8,923.

On 1 July 2021, Garkalne Municipality ceased to exist and its territory was merged with Ropaži Municipality as Garkalne Parish.

The main rivers were Lielā Jugla, Mazā Jugla (as a border river between Garkalne Municipality and Stopiņi Municipality), Krievupe, Jugla, in a small section of the river Tumšupe. The largest lakes in the region were Lielais Baltezers, Langstiņi Lake, Lielais Jūgezers, Mālezers, Mašēnu Lake and Upesciems Ponds. Maltuve Swamp is located in the eastern part of the territory.

== See also ==
- Administrative divisions of Latvia (2009)
