= Jugla =

Jugla may refer to:

- Jugla, Riga, a neighbourhood of Riga, Latvia
- Jugla Lake, a lake in Latvia
- Jugla (river), a river in Latvia
- Mazā Jugla, a river in Latvia
- Lielā Jugla, a river in Latvia
