= Riga offensive (1917) =

WWI battle over Riga, Latvia

- Part of the Eastern Front of the First World War
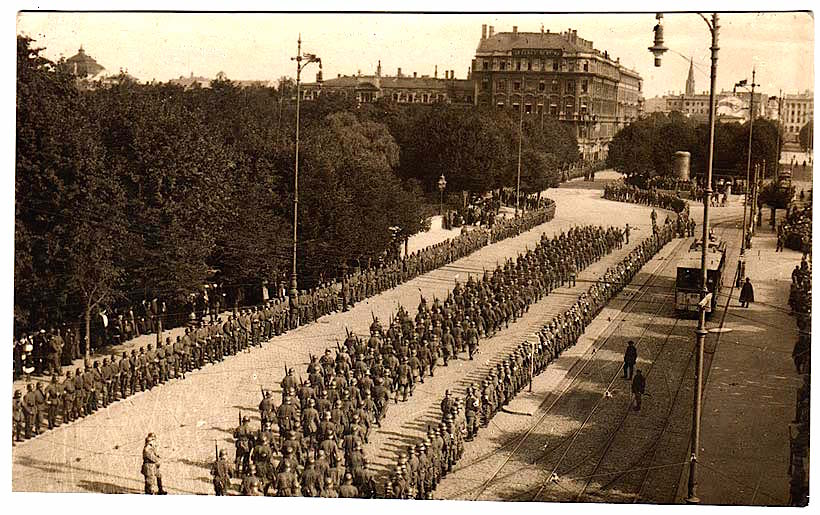
- German troops entering Riga
Date	1–5 September 1917
Location	banks of the river Mazā Jugla near Riga and Ikšķile (Uexküll). 56°58′10″N 24°19′24″E
Result	German victory
Territorial changes	Germans capture Riga

Belligerents
(German Empire) Germany	Russia

Commanders and leaders
(German Empire) Oskar von Hutier (German Empire) Georg Bruchmüller	Vladislav Klembovsky; Dmitri Parsky

Units involved
(German Empire) 8th Army	12th Army

Strength
60,000	192,000

Casualties and losses
4,200–5,000	25,000 casualties: 9,000–15,000 captured

The Riga offensive (Russian: Рижская операция), also called the Jugla offensive or the Battle of Riga (German: Schlacht um Riga), took place in early September 1917 and was the last major campaign on the Eastern Front of World War I before the Russian Provisional Government and its army began disintegrating.

The battle was fought between Oskar von Hutier's German Eighth Army and Dmitri Parsky's Russian Twelfth Army. The Russian forces in Latvia were under the command of Vladislav Klembovsky's Northern Front, (Note: A front is the Russian equivalent of an army group.) tasked with guarding the approaches to the Russian capital Petrograd. The Imperial German Army advanced through most of Lithuania and southern Latvia during the Russian Great Retreat in the summer of 1915, putting them in the vicinity of one of the largest industrial cities of the Russian Empire. The Twelfth Army was then tasked with defending Riga, though the situation on the northern frontier of the Eastern Front remained static until early 1917.

German quartermaster-general Erich Ludendorff gave the order for an offensive in the direction of Riga in early August 1917, shortly after defeating the Kerensky offensive, with the goal of pressuring Russia to accept a peace deal. Having anticipated the German attack, the Russian high command and General Klembovsky gave the order to abandon the bridgehead on the opposite side of the Daugava river near Riga on 20 August 1917. Preparations were made to abandon the city as well.

The German Eighth Army began its attack on 1 September, crossing the Daugava river south of the fortified Russian positions around Ikšķile. It was then split into two forces, with one attacking a nearby Russian corps that was threatening the bridgehead while another advanced north along the river towards Riga. Most of the combat took place near the Daugava bridgehead, when the Germans struck Russian positions further to the northeast along the Jugla river. Meanwhile, the second German force entered Riga with little resistance. But the fighting in the south and the march to Riga bought enough time for most of the Russian Twelfth Army to retreat from the city intact. The Germans captured only 9,000 Russian soldiers and overall the casualties were minimal on both sides.

The fall of Riga weakened the Russian front line along the Baltic Sea, bringing German forces closer to Petrograd, and was followed by Operation Albion, a German amphibious landing on several islands in the Baltic. The offensive was also the first large scale use of stormtrooper infantry tactics by the German Army, which had been pioneered by Oskar von Hutier, before their use in the West during the 1918 spring offensive.

== Background ==
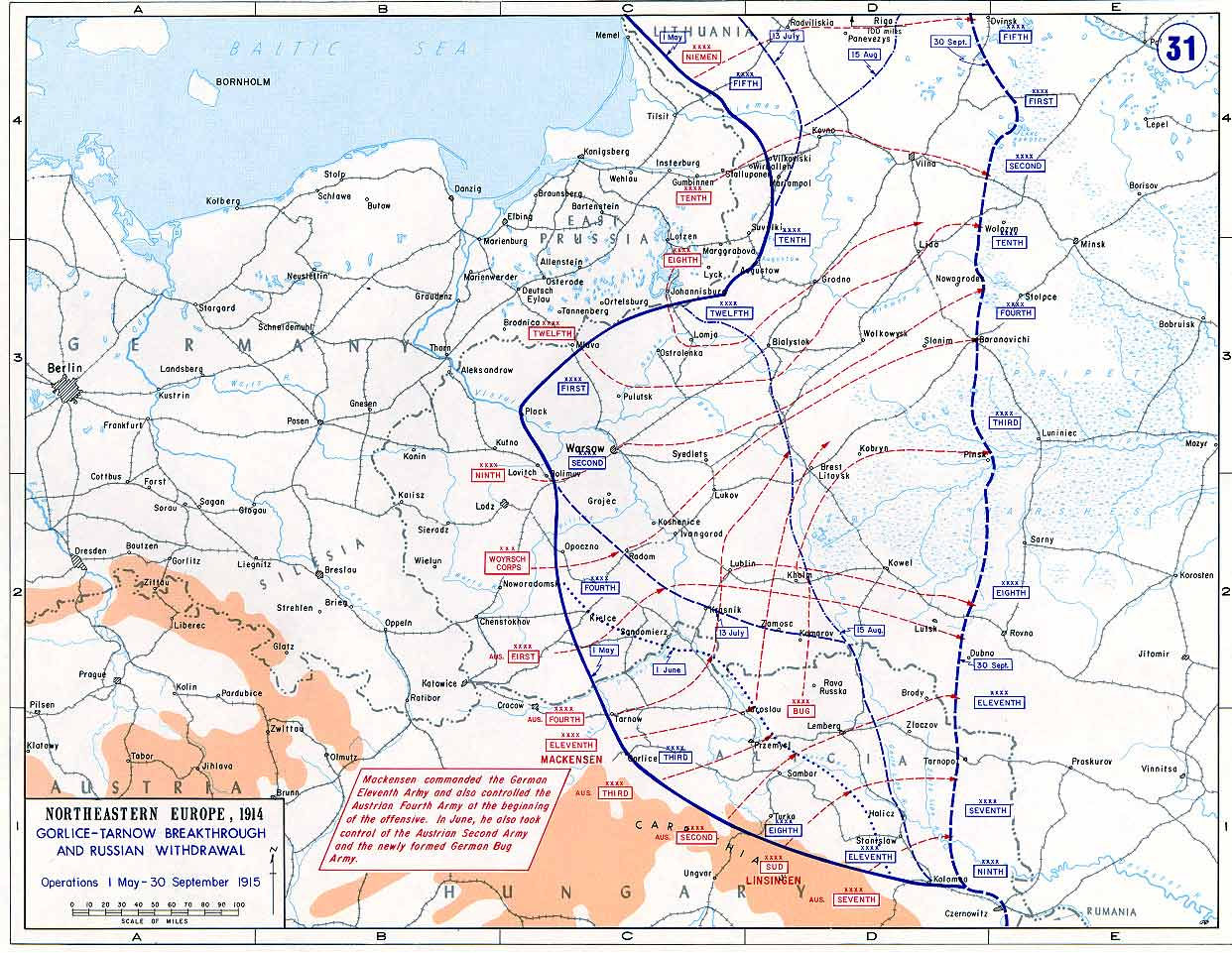
The new front lines after the Great Retreat in 1915.

After the successful Gorlice–Tarnów offensive by Germany and Austria-Hungary from May to July 1915 led to the elimination of Russia's entire Polish salient, the Great Retreat saw Russia also abandon much of western Belarus and Lithuania. During the retreat the armies of the Russian Northwestern Front moved further apart, leaving a gap in the area around Vilnius, and so the army group was split into two on 17 August 1915: the Northern Front was established in Riga and the Western Front in Minsk, by an order of the Russian high command, the Stavka. The German Tenth Army under Paul von Hindenburg initially wanted to break through the Vilnius–Kaunas gap to then turn from the north and capture Minsk, a major Russian communication and transportation center in the region. A force of several German cavalry divisions began advancing near Dvinsk, in between Minsk and Riga, but in response to this, several Russian armies were sent into a counterattack. This led the Germans to withdraw and allowed the Russians to re-establish the front line running approximately from Riga to the southeast to Dvinsk, and then south to Minsk. The new positions left German troops on the doorsteps of Riga, and the Stavka tasked the Twelfth Army with defending the city.

In March [O.S. February] 1917, a series of events in Petrograd led to the capital being taken over by revolutionary soldiers and demonstrators in what became known as the February Revolution. Emperor Nicholas II abdicated on 15 March 1917, and a Russian Provisional Government was established by liberal parties in the State Duma, while the Petrograd Soviet had the support of the revolutionaries, in an arrangement known as dual power. The Soviet issued its Order No. 1, which began a decline in discipline and willingness to fight among the Russian Army. Soldiers started refusing to follow orders from officers and formed their own committees. Regardless, Alexander Kerensky and the Provisional Government wanted to continue the war effort, including an offensive that had been planned since 1916. The Kerensky offensive was launched in July [O.S. June] 1917 with the Southwestern Front and ended in failure despite some initial success. The troops of the Northern Front, the closest army group to Petrograd, were more affected by the revolutionary agitation and political disruption in the capital than the rest of the army in early 1917. After the failure of the Kerensky offensive, the spread of Bolshevik influence among the entire army accelerated. Despite these disturbances, the majority of the Russian Army was still at the front line and was willing to fight, even after the failed offensive in mid-summer 1917.

Amidst this situation, General Lavr Kornilov, who had been named as the head of the Petrograd Military District by the Provisional Government, began preparations in April 1917 to form a new army near the capital to counter a potential German advance in the Riga area. However, he was reassigned to another part of the front before that plan could be implemented. After being appointed the army supreme commander in July 1917, Kornilov returned to the plan and in mid-August decided to transfer the 3rd Cavalry Corps and the Caucasian Native Cavalry Division from the south towards the capital on the pretext of strengthening the Northern Front and the defenses of Petrograd. The Kerensky offensive coincided with the July Days, a series of protests in which soldiers of the rebellious Petrograd garrison, Baltic Fleet sailors, and Bolshevik agitators tried to overthrow the Provisional Government. The attempt failed because the Provisional Government still had significant support, and Vladimir Lenin was forced to flee to Finland. The Cossacks, officer cadets, and members of shock battalions supported the Provisional Government, while the ordinary infantry were divided. In the aftermath of the July Days, Kornilov began imposing measures to restore strict discipline in the Russian Army. This included the restoration of the death penalty, the limiting of the powers of soldiers' committees, and imprisoning those who disobeyed orders. At the Moscow State Conference in late August 1917, Kornilov warned that the Germans would capture Riga and then advance on Petrograd if order was not restored in the army.

The front lines near Riga remained unchanged since the initial German advance into Lithuania and Latvia in the summer of 1915. The Russian high command anticipated a German offensive in that area in August 1917. In the early part of that month, German quartermaster-general Erich Ludendorff and Colonel Max Hoffmann planned an operation to take Riga, aimed at capturing an important industrial city along the Baltic Sea and putting pressure on Russia to sue for peace. Kornilov, Vladislav Klembovsky, and the Twelfth Army commander, Dmitri Parsky, decided to abandon the bridgehead on opposite side of the Dvina river, located near Riga, with Klembovsky preparing to evacuate the bridgehead on 20 August 1917. The next day he also started removing forces from the city itself, even though Kornilov had wanted to hold the city. In preparation for the attack, Oskar von Hutier's German Eighth Army received reinforcements, being raised to a strength of eight infantry and two cavalry divisions, organized in four corps, while his forces were faced with three corps of the Russian Twelfth Army. Hutier planned to not attack the city directly, but to cross the Dvina river to the south, near Ikšķile (Uexküll).

== Order of battle ==
Riga was defended by the Twelfth Army (Gen. Dmitri Parsky) of the Northern Front, which included the following.

- 2nd Siberian Army Corps
- 6th Siberian Army Corps
- 43rd Army Corps

The German forces, the Eighth Army (Gen. Oskar von Hutier), consisted of the following.

- III Reserve Corps
- VI Corps
- LI Corps
- LX Corps

== Offensive ==
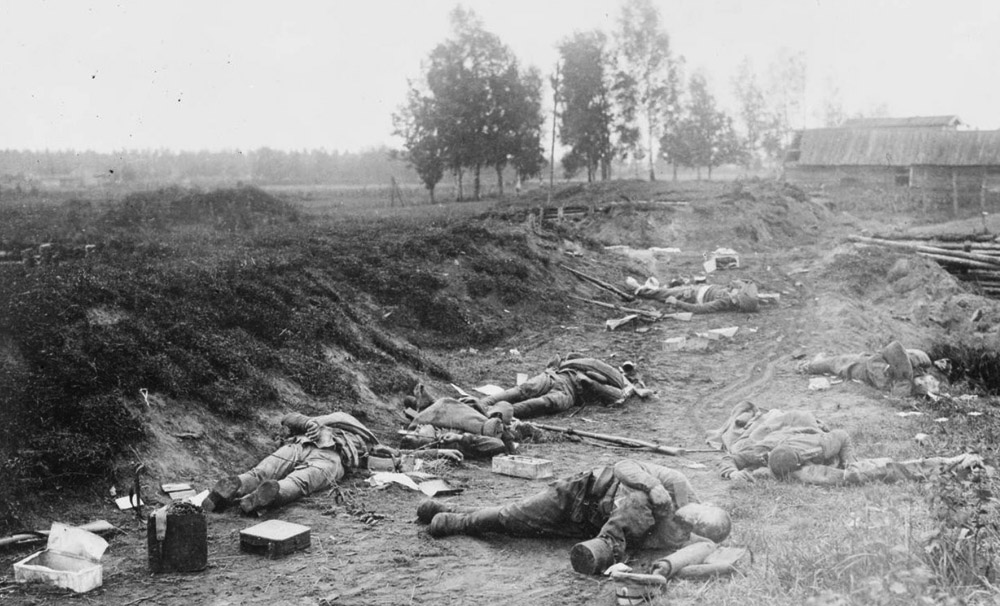
Russian infantrymen killed by a gas attack.

The German infantry attack was preceded by an artillery bombardment on 1 September 1917, organized by Colonel Georg Bruchmüller, the commander of the Eighth Army's artillery. The barrage included explosive and chemical gas shells. The troops that were to be involved in the attack were visited by Prince Leopold of Bavaria, the supreme commander of Ober Ost, on the same day. The bombardment targeted the Russian positions in the vicinity of Ikšķile (Uexküll), about 30 kilometres (19 miles) southeast of Riga. With 1,100 German guns, they overwhelmed the relatively few Russian artillery pieces. This was followed by the advance of the 19th Reserve Division and the 202nd and 203rd Divisions towards the river, which they crossed with boats and established a bridgehead before then building pontoon bridges. Prince Leopold personally led the crossing of the Dvina river, which faced almost no opposition.

By this point, Parsky had given the order for the Twelfth Army to evacuate Riga. To cover the withdrawal, he used the 43rd Army Corps, consisting of four divisions under Lieutenant General Vasily Boldyrev. These included the 2nd Latvian Rifle Brigade. Located near Ropaži, 18 kilometres (11 miles) northeast of the German bridgehead, they began to move to counterattack the German Eighth Army. Meanwhile, the Germans began advancing and reached the Mazā Jugla river. At the same time, their aerial reconnaissance confirmed that large numbers of Russian troops were leaving the city. By 2 September the German commander, von Hutier, decided to send the VI Corps along the Dvina river to take Riga, while the LI Corps would move northeast to encircle the Russian force before it could withdraw, and the III Reserve Corps would cover their eastern flank. Von Hutier's goal was to encircle the Russian Twelfth Army before it could abandon the area. Parsky decided that any defense of the city would be ineffective and ordered it to be abandoned, and changed his orders to the 43rd Corps, telling Boldyrev to hold up the German advance as long as possible so the rest of the army could finish the withdrawal.

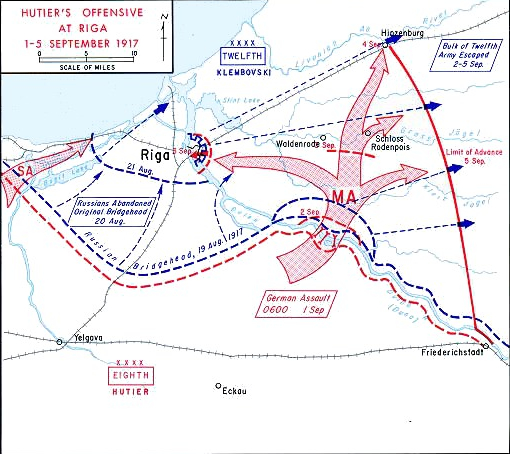
The troop movements in the Riga offensive.

When the German troops attacked the Russian positions on the Jugla river, they met strong resistance. Gas shells, flamethrowers, and aerial attacks were also employed by the German force, but the Russians still fought off their attempts to cross for most of the day. The Latvian Riflemen fought especially hard. The Germans secured a bridgehead along the Jugla river toward the end of the day despite the Russian resistance. Later on, Kornilov noted that the Russian troops of the Twelfth Army followed a similar pattern that had been present during the Kerensky offensive, which was that the cavalry, artillery, machine-gun units, and a few infantry units fought well, but the majority of the infantry were in a poor state and decided to flee instead of holding their positions. Von Hutier had his forces use the new infiltration tactics that he took part in developing, such as moving more fluidly instead of attacking in a straight line, with one unit advancing while another provided cover fire, before later reversing those roles. The advance units also passed many of the defenders and left them to be eliminated by the main force.

Meanwhile, the German VI and LX Corps reached Riga by nightfall on 2 September, and commenced their attack the next morning. The remaining Russian troops around the city did not put up much of a resistance, choosing to retreat. The Germans entered and secured the city on 3 September. At the Jugla river, the 43rd Army Corps sustained significant casualties and already had supply shortages, and as the Germans got through the more determined soldiers, the rest of the force began retreating. The Latvian Riflemen in particular took heavy losses, including more than half of their troops. In the meantime, the Twelfth Army had been able to complete its evacuation. Many Russian artillery pieces were left behind because of the time constraint and the lack of means to move them. German Colonel Max Hoffman noted that relatively few Russian soldiers were captured, and although they found large quantities of equipment and artillery, most of the Twelfth Army succeeded in escaping the attempted encirclement.

== Aftermath ==
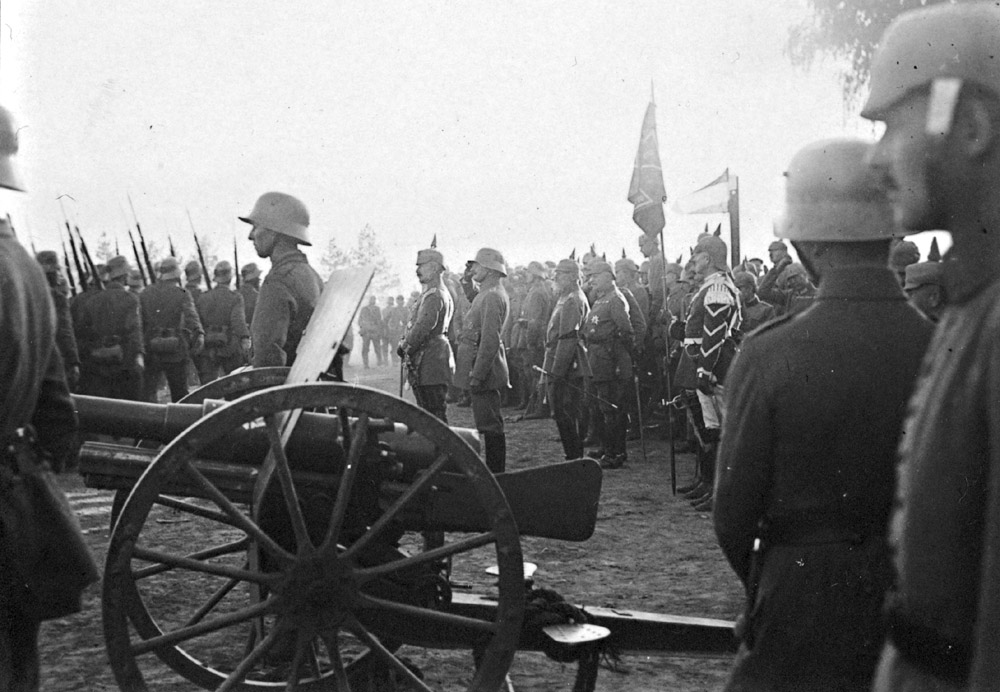
Kaiser Wilhelm II observing a parade of German troops in Riga shortly after the battle.

The majority of residents in Riga were indifferent to the arrival of the German troops, while the aristocracy consisting of Baltic Germans hoped they could preserve the status they had during the tsarist era. The fall of Riga marked the loss of a major industrial center and put German troops closer to Petrograd, though the Russian Twelfth Army succeeded in its objective of leaving the area intact and avoided being encircled. It took up new positions further north in Wenden. The offensive had an impact on Russian morale. The newspaper Novoye Vremya noted that discipline in the army had fallen so severely, especially in the Northern Front, that large numbers of troops in a fortified position with stocks of artillery and other supplies could not put up a strong fight to hold the city.

The Russian supreme commander, Kornilov, noted that along with Riga itself, Russia lost the fortress of Ust-Dvinsk, and the front line along the Gulf of Riga was weakened. The Germans launched an amphibious operation to take several islands just north of the Gulf, shortly after the Riga offensive. That operation became one of the earliest examples of an amphibious landing involving air, naval and ground forces in military history. The fall of these islands made Kornilov believe that the Germans planned an attack on Tallinn (also called Reval) and Petrograd.

At some point after his rise to prominence in August 1917, Kornilov decided to launch a coup against the Petrograd Soviet and the Bolsheviks, beginning several days after the Riga offensive. He ordered the 3rd Cavalry Corps to take control of Petrograd, which he had ordered to a location near the capital to strengthen the Russian positions there just before the fall of Riga. However, most of the ordinary soldiers refused to participate, and Kerensky removed him from his position as supreme commander. The coup collapsed and Kornilov's key conspirators were imprisoned. As a result of the Kornilov coup, the Bolsheviks gained the majority in the Petrograd and Moscow Soviets, and the soldiers became increasingly anti-officer. Distrust of officers and unwillingness to fight spread throughout the entire Russian Army starting after Kornilov's failed coup, and the Provisional Government's perceived lenient treatment of Kornilov afterwards led to its decline in support among the troops. The Kornilov affair had an important role in the lead up to the October Revolution.

On the German side, the Riga offensive was the first large scale use of stormtrooper-type units. The combination of new infantry and artillery tactics (like the use of gas shells to assist an infantry assault) used by Hutier and Bruchmüller at Riga was repeated shortly after that operation at the Battle of Caporetto against the Italians, before being seen on a large scale on the Western Front for the first time in 1918. These would later be called by the Western Allies as "Hutier Tactics."

== Bibliography ==
- Buttar, Prit (2017). The Splintered Empires: The Eastern Front 1916–17. Oxford: Osprey Publishing. ISBN 978-1-4728-1986-4.
- Ferro, Marc (1971). "The Russian Soldier in 1917: Undisciplined, Patriotic, and Revolutionary". Slavic Review. 30 (3): 483–512. doi:10.2307/2493539. JSTOR 2493539.
- Katkov, George (1980). Russia 1917: The Kornilov Affair. London; New York: Longman. ISBN 978-0-582-49101-4.
- Kenez, Peter (1971). Civil War in South Russia, 1918: The First Year of the Volunteer Army. University of California Press. ISBN 978-0-520-31226-5.
- Oleynikov, Alexei (2016). Россия–щит Антанты [Russia–Shield of the Entente]. Foreword by Nikolai Starikov. St. Petersburg: Piter. ISBN 978-5-496-01795-4.
- Reese, Roger R. (2019). The Imperial Russian Army in Peace, War, and Revolution, 1856–1917. Lawrence: University Press of Kansas. ISBN 978-0-7006-2860-5.
- Stevenson, David (2017). 1917: War, Peace, and Revolution. Oxford: Oxford University Press. ISBN 978-0-19-100676-0.
- Stone, David R. (2021). The Russian Army in the Great War: The Eastern Front, 1914–1917. Lawrence: University Press of Kansas. ISBN 978-0-7006-3308-1.
- Tucker, Spencer (1999). European Powers in the First World War: An Encyclopedia. New York; London: Garland Publishing. ISBN 978-1-135-68425-9.
- Tucker, Spencer (2001). The Great War, 1914–1918. Taylor & Francis. ISBN 978-1-134-81750-4.
- Zabecki, David T. (2006). The German 1918 Offensives: A Case Study in The Operational Level of War. New York: Routledge. ISBN 978-1-134-25225-1.
