= Lielā Jugla =

River in Latvia

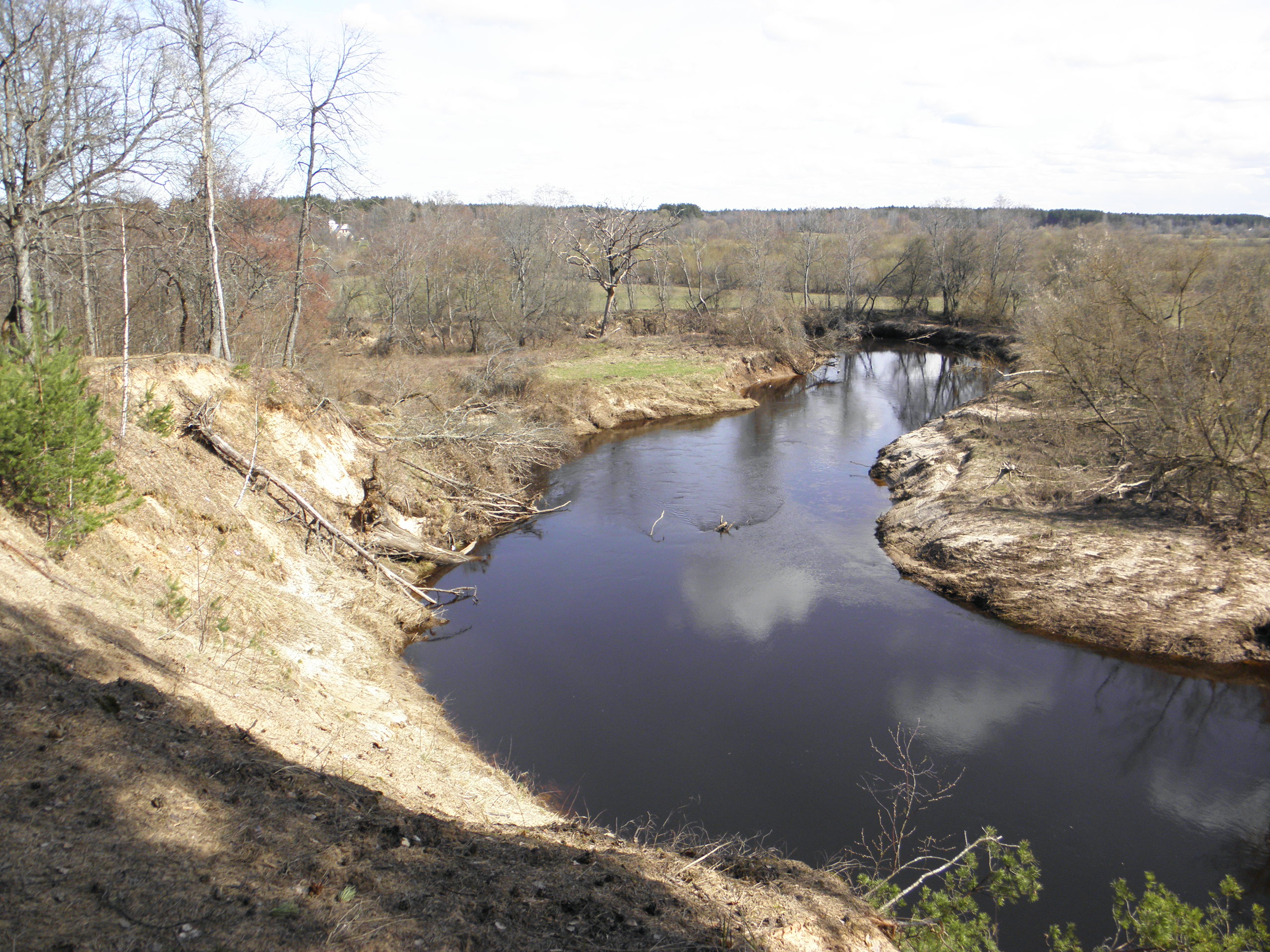
- Lielā Jugla near Tumšupe

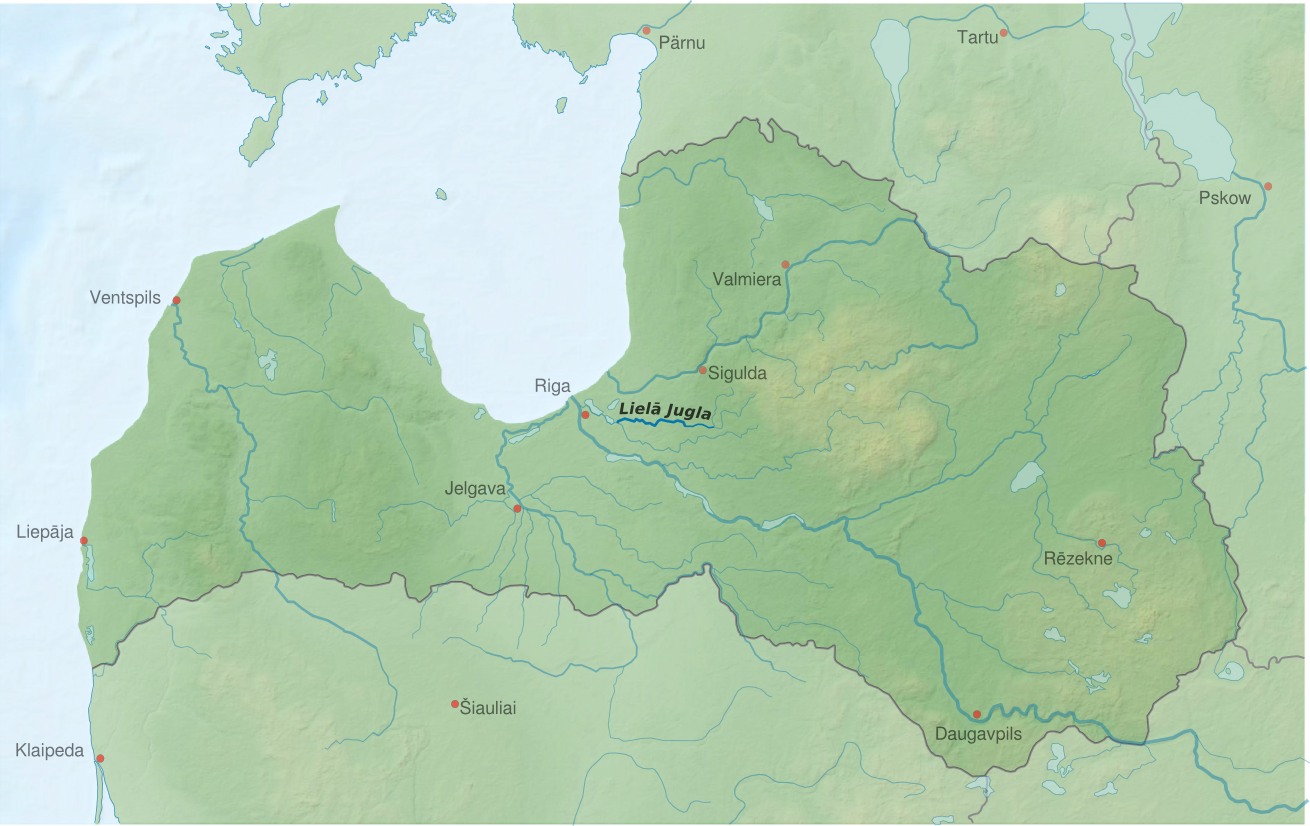

Location
- Country: Latvia

Physical characteristics
- Source
  - location: Mālpils parish, Sigulda Municipality, Latvia
  - elevation: 71 m (233 ft)
- Mouth: Jugla
  - location: near Riga
  - coordinates: 56°58′10″N 24°19′24″E
  - elevation: 0.1 m (0.33 ft)
- Length: 62 km (39 mi)
- Basin size: 950.8 km^{2} (367.1 sq mi)

Basin features
- Progression: Jugla→ Ķīšezers→ Mīlgrāvis→ Daugava→ Baltic Sea
- Tributaries
  - right: Krievupe, Tumšupe

Lielā Jugla is a river in Latvia. It flows for 63 kilometres (the length would reach 118 km if the Mergupe river were counted as part of the Lielā Jugla), through the municipalities of Sigulda and Ropaži. The source of the river is located in Mālpils parish, Sigulda Municipality 71 m above sea level, whereas the mouth is 0.1 m asl. River slope is 1.1 m/km, annual drainage 0.26 km^{3}. Lielā Jugla begins at the confluence of the Suda and Mergupe rivers in village Sidgunda.

Lielā Jugla joins with Mazā Jugla thus forming the river Jugla shortly before its mouth into Jugla Lake at the Riga city eastern border with the municipality of Ropaži. The river is a water tourism site. The Ropaži hydroelectric plant is located on the river.

Virtually the entire river flows along the Lowland of Central Latvia (Latvian: Viduslatvijas zemiene). The river meanders through a wooded area, the pool is heavily drained in some places. The shores are generally flat, with occasional Devonian bare rocks. There are many floodplains in the lower reaches of the mouths of rivers Krievupe and Tumšupe.

From Sidgunda to Ropaži the river is 5–15 m wide. In and around Ropaži, the regime of the river is determined by the operation of the local hydroelectric power station (HES), where the river is crossed by a dam - a 1.5 m high concrete wall, which creates an artificial waterfall. A 1.5 km long left outflow begins at the dam, which forms an island with Ropaži Park and the municipality council on it. After the HES the river is calm and shallow in low water, before rapids begin near Bajāri and the river reaches a slope of 3.5 m/km. The thresholds end at Zaķumuiža, then the flow calms down again. At the mouth of Jugla Lake it meets the Mazā Jugla River, forming the Jugla River, the sediments of which as Jugla Delta penetrate deep into the lake.

In the river live pike, perch, roach, bream, eel.

== Flow by distance ==
Flow
Kilometres from mouth	Altitude (m)	Object
62,4; 49,7; 43,9; 35,1; 34,4; 33,8; 25,0; 24,9; 18,9; 8,7; 3,0; 1,2; 0	66,4; 57,1; 51,4; 40,0; 36,9; 36,1; 18,2; 17,9; 14,1; 1,2; 0,4; 0,2; 0,1	Sidgunda bridge Augšciems bridge Laimnieki bridge Dam of Ropaži HES; Pedestrian bridge in Ropaži; Bridge of road P10; Pietēnupe River (left); Village Bajārkrogs; Zaķumuiža bridge Tumšupe River (right); Krievupe River (right); Bridge of Riga bypass A4; Junction of Lielā Jugla and Mazā Jugla

== Tributaries ==
- Left: Krievupe (48 km), Tumšupe (49 km).
- Right: Pietēnupe (14 km).

== Biggest settlements ==
Villages Sidgunda, Ropaži, Zaķumuiža, Silakrogs, Sunīši, Upesciems.

== Pictures ==
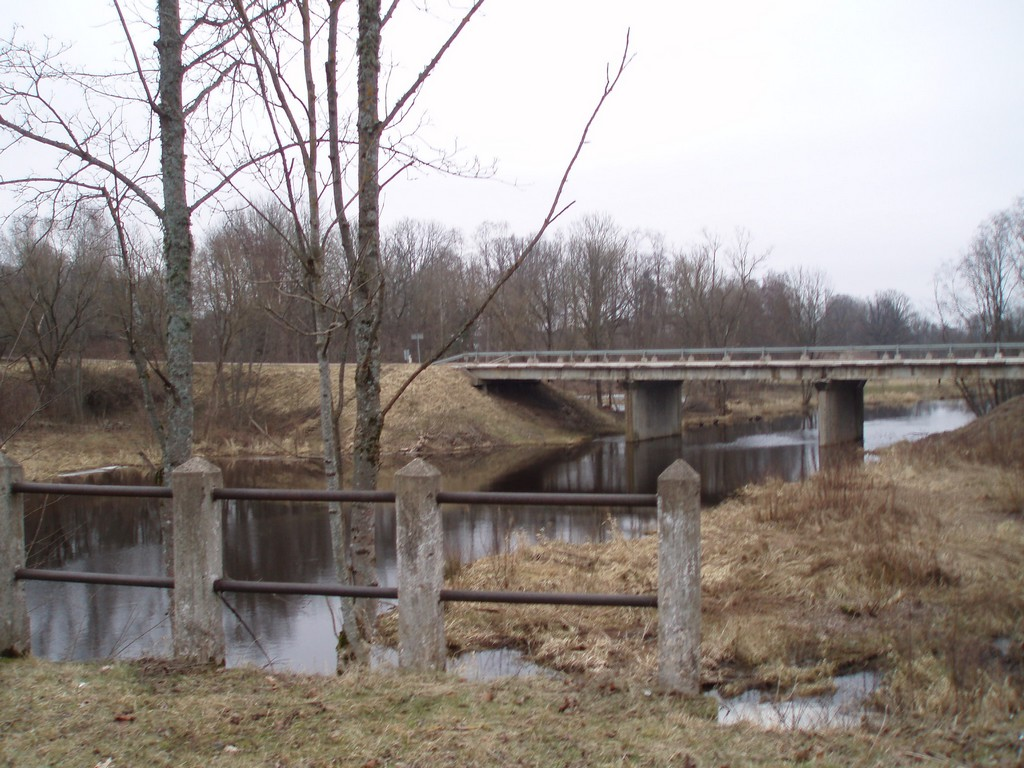
Sidgunda bridge.

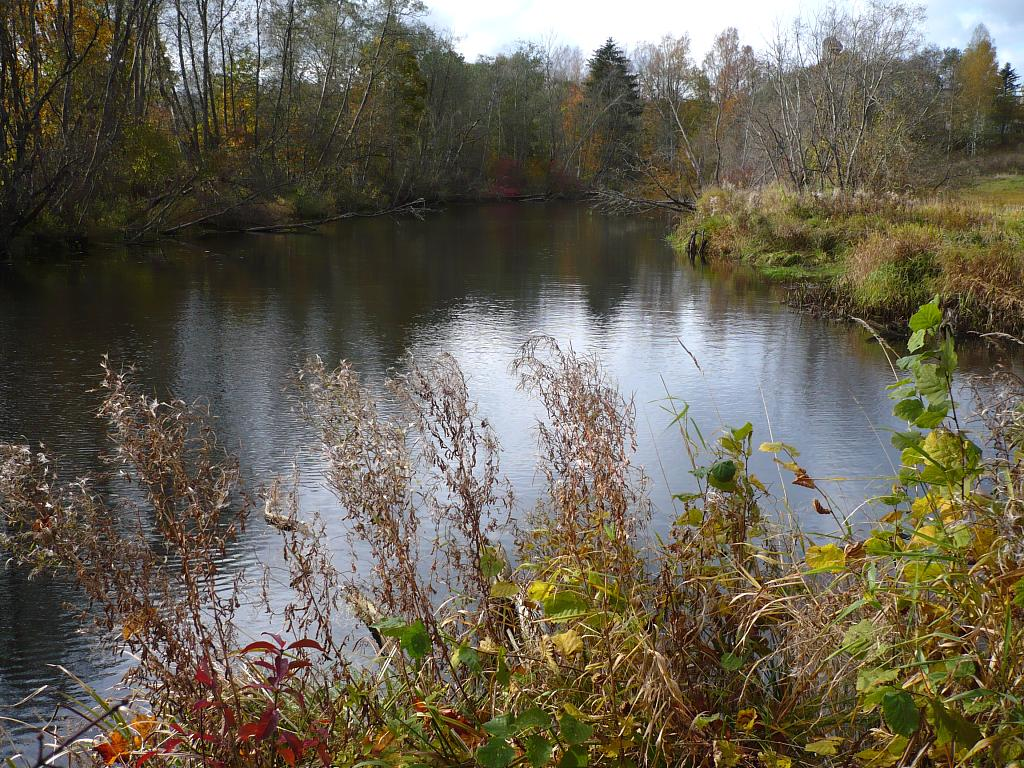
Confluence of Suda and Mergupe, beginning of Lielā Jugla.

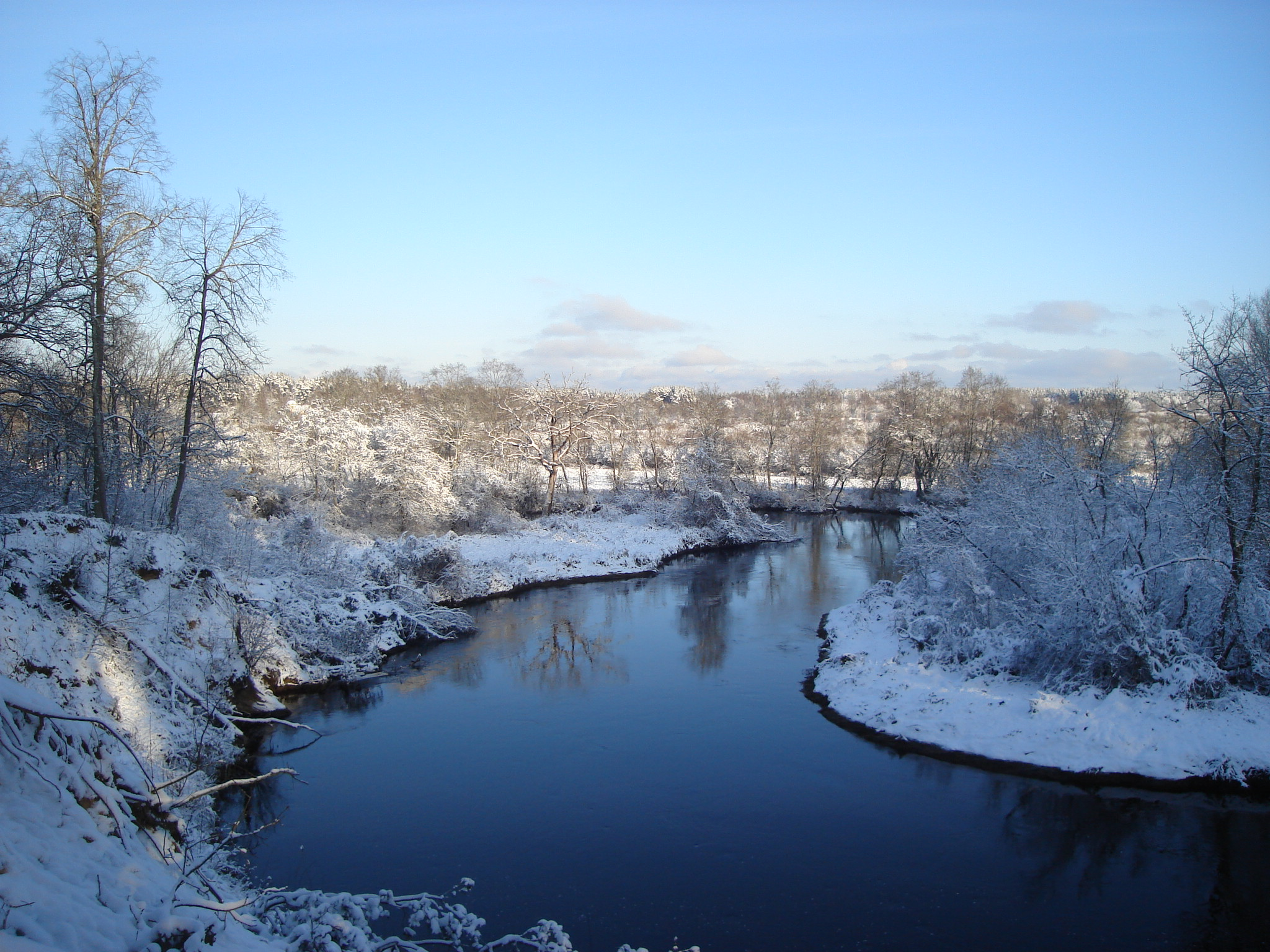
Near Sunīši.

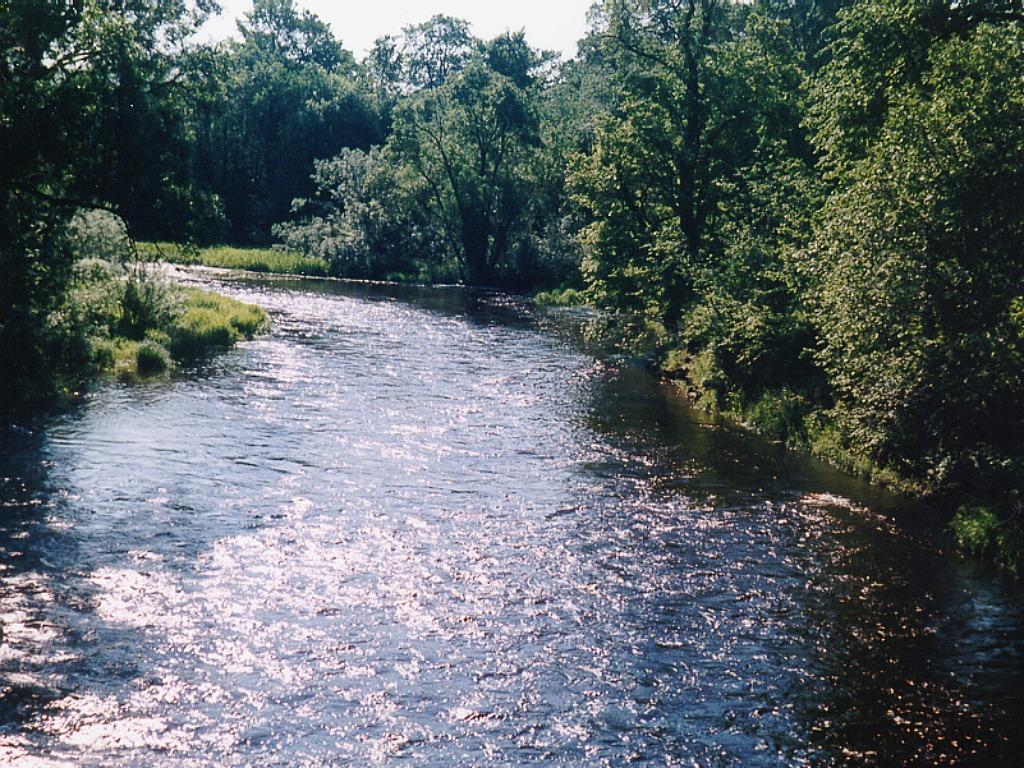
Near Zaķumuiža.

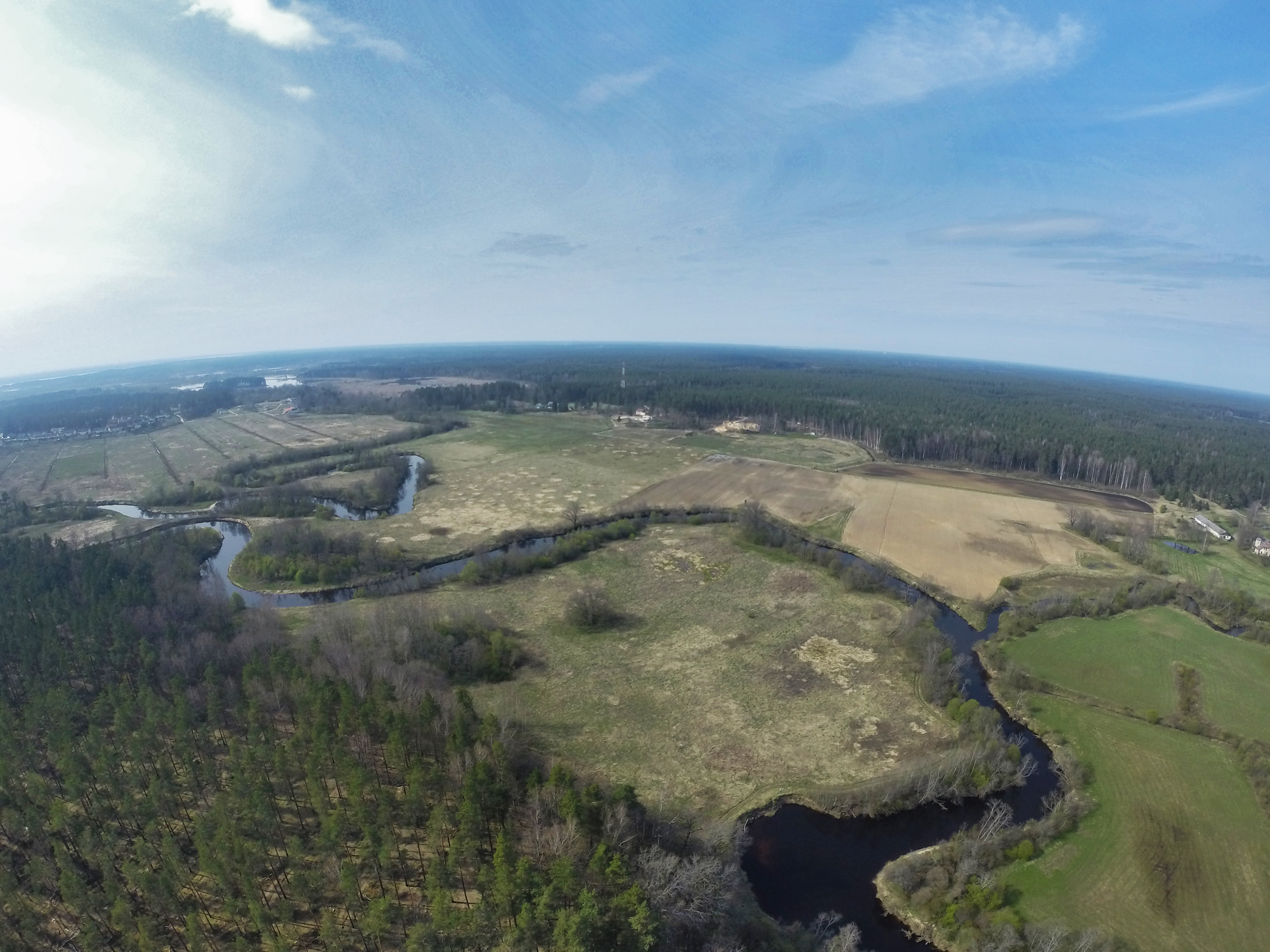
Near Silakrogs.

== See also ==
- List of rivers of Latvia
