= Upeslejas =

Village in Latvia

Coordinates: 56°55′27″N 24°22′59″E

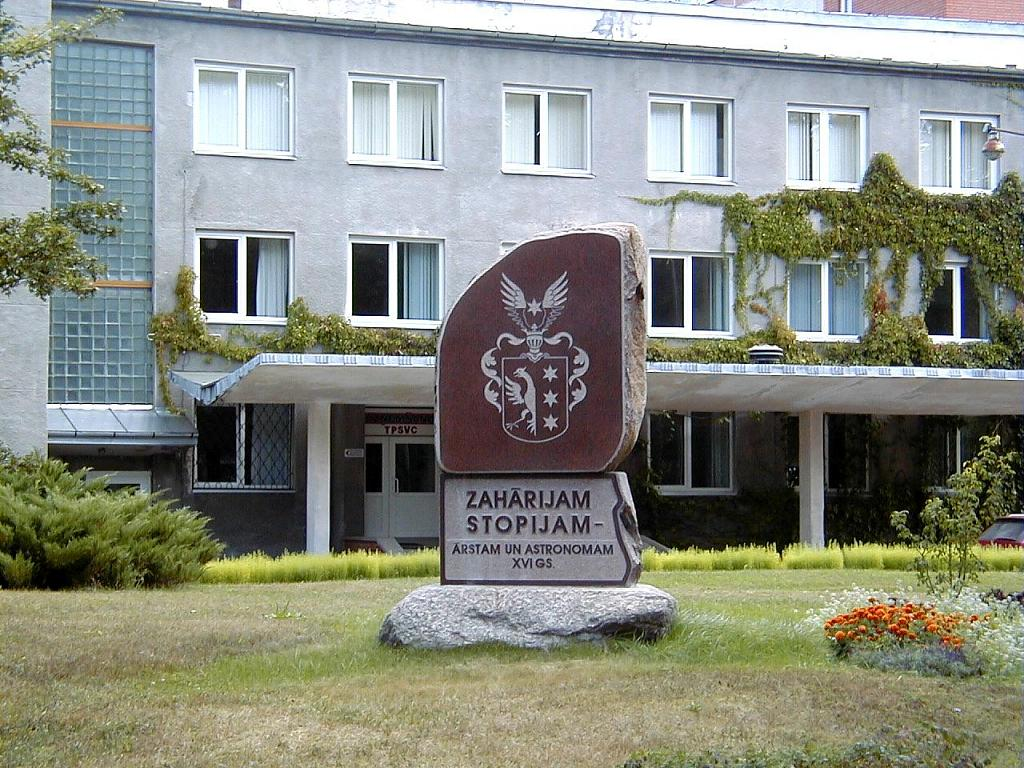
Memorial to Zacharias Stopius in Upeslejas

Upeslejas is a village in Stopiņi Parish, Ropaži Municipality in the Vidzeme region of Latvia. It is located near Mazā Jugla river, about 15 km from Riga.
