= Dreiliņi =

Dreiliņi may refer to:

- Dreiliņi, Riga, a neighbourhood in Riga, Latvia
- Dreiliņi, Ropaži Municipality, a village in Ropaži Municipality, Latvia
