= Dreiliņi, Ropaži Municipality =

Village in Latvia

Coordinates: 56.9433°N 24.2469°E

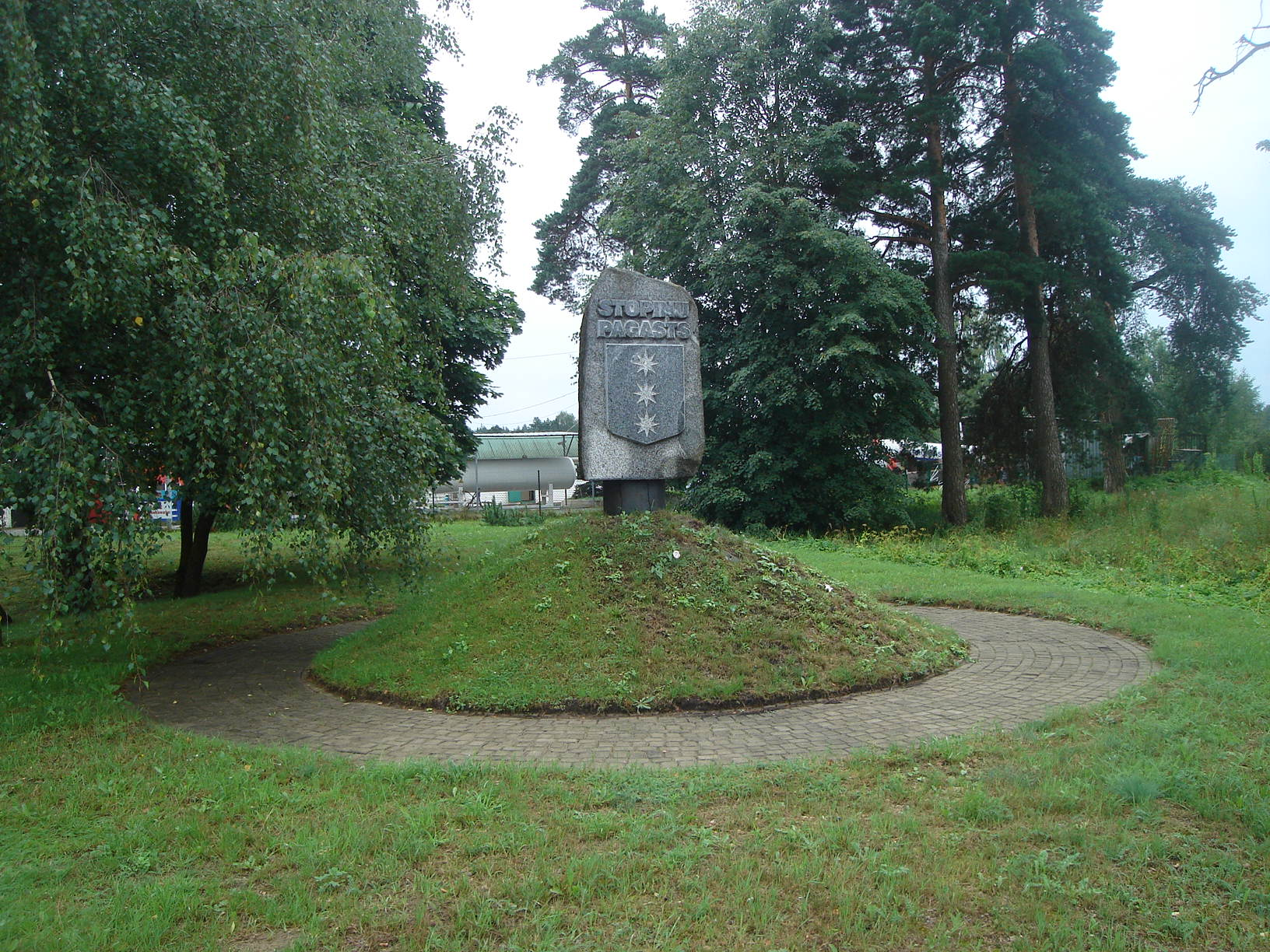
Dreiliņi, Stopiņu novads, Latvia

Dreiliņi is a village in Stopiņi Parish, Ropaži Municipality in the Vidzeme region and the Riga Planning Region of Latvia. From 2009 until 2021, it was part of the former Stopiņi Municipality.

Artist Burkards Dzenis was born in Dreiliņi. According to the September 2023 decision of the Ropaži County regarding the expansion of the territory of the large village of Ulbroka, Dreiliņi is located south of the P4 highway. The territory also includes the village of new private houses Saulīši.
