= Gustavs Šķilters =

Latvian sculptor (1874–1954)

Gustavs Šķilters (15 November 1874 – 24 September 1954) was a Latvian artist, working mainly as a sculptor.

== Biography ==
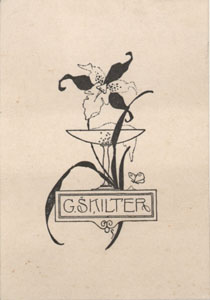
Rihards Zariņš, Bookplate G. Šķilter 1900

Gustavs Šķilters was born in present-day Rencēni Parish, the son of a blacksmith, and trained to become an artist in Saint Petersburg. He graduated in 1899 and with the aid of a scholarship spent the following six years abroad. He traveled to Germany and spent much time in Paris, where he was influenced by the flowering of Art Nouveau and studied sculpture under Paul Richer and Gustave Germain. He also frequented the atelier of Auguste Rodin, often together with his compatriots Teodors Zaļkalns and Burkards Dzenis. After his return to Saint Petersburg in 1905, he took up teaching sculpture at the present-day Saint Petersburg Art and Industry Academy, a position he would hold for the next thirteen years except for a short spell working for jeweler Peter Carl Fabergé. Following the Latvian War of Independence, Šķilters moved to Riga and took up the newly created position of professor at the Art Academy of Latvia in 1923.

Gustavs Šķilters worked mainly as a sculptor. Several of his works exist only as plaster models, an effect of there not being any professional foundries in Latvia during the time in which he was active. His art displays influences, early on, from Art Nouveau and Symbolism. He was also active as an art critic.

Šķilters died in Riga in 1954, aged 79, and was buried at Forest Cemetery, Riga.
