= Rumbula =

Rumbula may refer to:

- Rumbula, Riga, a neighbourhood in Riga, Latvia
- Rumbula, Stopiņi Municipality, a village in Stopiņi Municipality, Latvia
- Rumbula Air Base, an air base located southeast of the city centre of Riga, Latvia
- Rumbula massacre, part of the Holocaust in Latvia near Riga
