= Līči, Ropaži Municipality =

Village in Latvia

Coordinates: 56.9492°N 24.3564°E

Līči is a village in Stopiņi Parish, Ropaži Municipality in the Vidzeme region and the Riga Planning Region of Latvia. From 2009 until 2021, it was part of the former Stopiņi Municipality.
