= Catharina Stopia =

Swedish diplomat

Catharina Stopia (died after 2 April 1657) was the first female diplomat in Sweden, and Sweden's first ambassador to Russia during her tenure in office 1632–1634.

Stopia's father was the city doctor of Riga, Zacharias Stopius. In 1620, she married Johan Möller, who was ennobled Liljenhagen and appointed as ambassador of Sweden to Russia in 1630. Stopia (as was still common in Sweden at the time, she would not have used the name of her spouse) accompanied him to his office in Moscow.

When Johan Möller died in 1632, Stopia was officially credited by the riksråd to continue with the work of her late spouse and fill the position of his office as ambassador. During her tenure, she successfully completed a negotiation regarding the trade relations between Sweden and Russia. However, she later experienced serious difficulties, and her estate was attacked and burnt down. In 1634, she was forced to flee to Sweden.

Stopia remarried the colonel lieutenant Christoffer Jagow in circa 1637. She is last mentioned on 2 April 1657.

== See also ==
- Bartholda van Swieten, another contemporary female diplomat
