= Zacharias Stopius =

Latvian doctor and astronomer

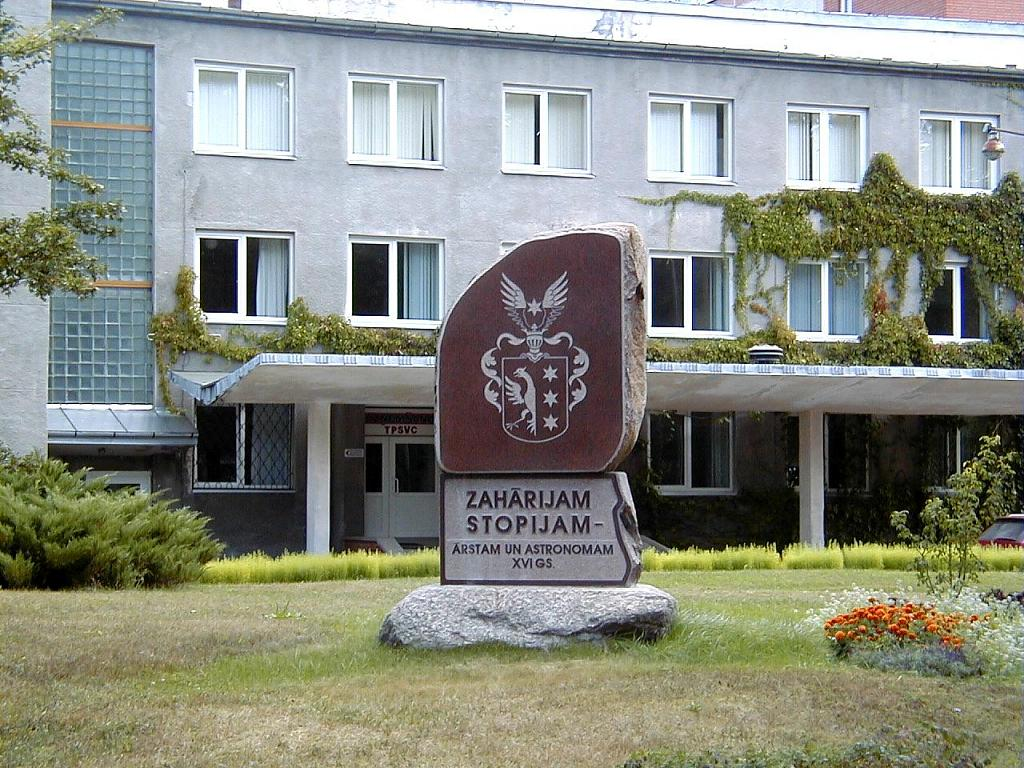
Memorial to Zacharias Stopius in Upeslejas, Latvia

Zacharias Stopius (Latvian: Zahārijs Stopijs; c. 1535 – late 16th or early 17th century) was a Baltic German medical doctor, astronomer and astrologer, mainly active in present-day Latvia. He was ennobled by the King of Poland in 1570. His daughter Catharina Stopia was one of the first female diplomats in the service of Sweden.

== Career ==
Zacharias Stopius came from Breslau, then Silesia, now Wrocław in present-day Poland, and was enrolled in the University of Rostock in 1559. He doctored in medicine, and subsequently found employment in Riga. There, he entered the service of the Archbishop of Riga, Wilhelm von Brandenburg. He became city doctor of Riga in 1562, and in 1567 also entered into the service of the Duke of Courland and Semigallia, Gotthard Kettler as his personal physician. He consequently moved from Riga to the court of the duke in Jelgava. However, he retained his position as city physician of Riga until 1585. As a medical doctor he had a good reputation among the nobility, and also attended the royal court of Poland in Warsaw. In 1570, he was ennobled by Sigismund II Augustus. He received several donations of land throughout his career and established an estate, Stopiushof, outside Riga, which has given its name to the current Stopiņi Municipality. The current coat of arms of the municipality also incorporates elements from the coat of arms of Stopius.

Apart from his medical practice, Stopius also published works on astronomy and astrology. Furthermore, he wrote a treatise on economics, Liefländiſchen Oekonomie, which however was never printed but contains, i.a., instructions of how to construct sundials.

He was also involved in the politics of his time. During a period of civil unrest between 1584 and 1589, arising over a conflict concerning the adoption of the Gregorian calendar, Stopius acted as a negotiator between the city council and the population of the city.

== Personal life ==
Stopius was married twice: in 1563 he married Anna Drobe, daughter of a burgher of Riga, and in 1574 he married Anna Ingenover, also the daughter of a burgher in Riga. He had eight children, though it is not known which children were born from which marriage. His daughter Catharina Stopia entered Swedish service and was the first woman to serve as a diplomat of Sweden. His son, also named Zacharias Stopius, became personal physician to the king of Poland.

== Works cited ==
- Lele-Rozentāle, Dzintra (2018). "Regionale Bezüge der deutschsprachigen Wissensvermittlung im baltischen Raum Linguistische Beobachtungen am Beispiel livländischer Quellen des 17. Jahrhunderts". In Prinz, Michael; Schiewe, Jürgen (eds.). Vernakuläre Wissenschaftskommunikation (in German). De Gruyter. pp. 231–254. ISBN 978-3-11-047498-5.
- Brennsohn, Isidorus (1905). Die Aerzte Livlands von den ältesten Zeiten bis zur Gegenwart. Riga: Verlag von E. Bruhns.
