= Cekule =

Village in Latvia

Coordinates: 56.924°N 24.410°E

Cekule is a village in Stopiņi Parish, Ropaži Municipality in the Vidzeme region and the Riga Planning Region of Latvia.
