= Teodors Zaļkalns =

Latvian sculptor (1876–1972)

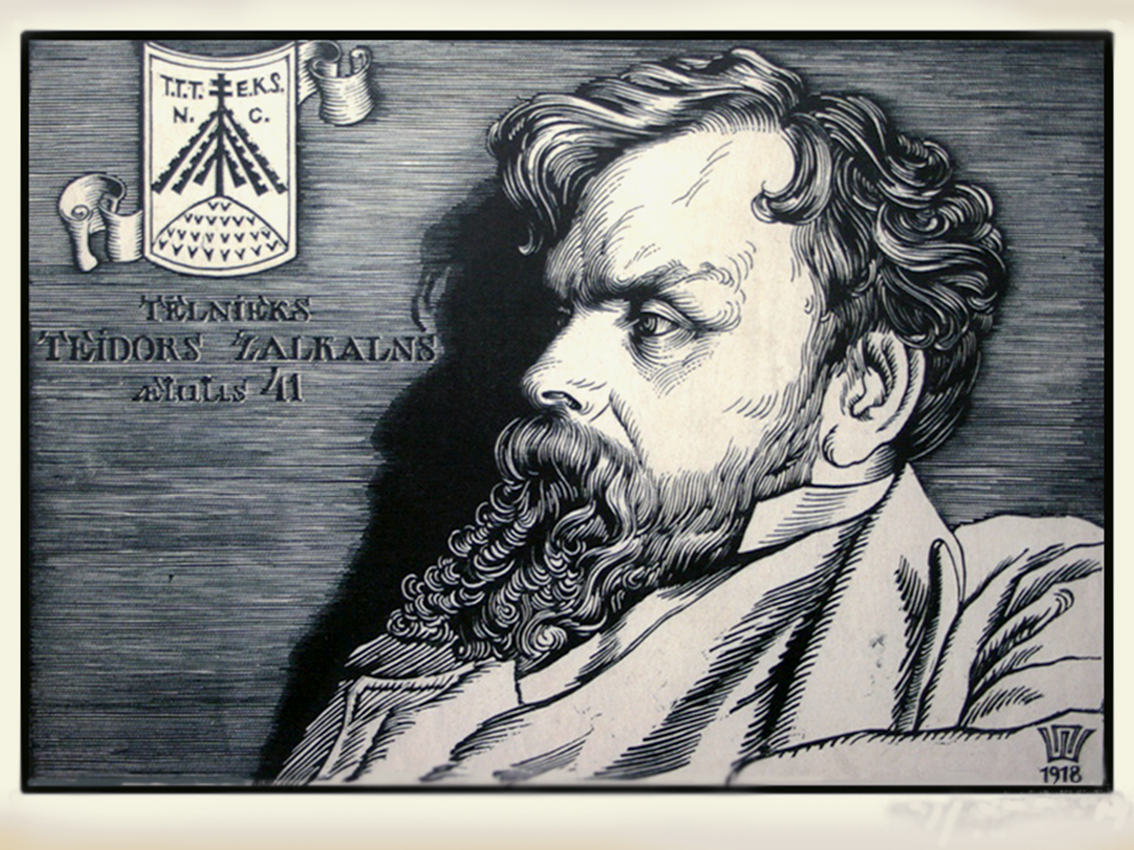
- Portrait of Teodors Zaļkalns by Pavel Shillingovsky
- Born: Teodors Grīnbergs; 30 November 1876; Allaži Parish, Governorate of Livonia, Russian Empire
- Died: 6 September 1972 (aged 95); Riga, Latvian SSR, Soviet Union
- Known for: Sculpture

Teodors Zaļkalns (born Teodors Grīnbergs; 30 November 1876 – 6 September 1972) was a Latvian sculptor, poet, medalist and teacher who was among the first professional Latvian sculptors.

== Biography ==
He was born in 1876 in Allažu parish in the family of a farmer and merchant. Grīnbergs studied at the Allaži parish school, then at the Riga city real school. In 1893, he entered the Stiglitz Central School of Technical Drawing in St. Petersburg, specializing in decorative painting and etching. In 1899, he went to study in Munich, then to Paris with the aim of improving his decorative painting skills, but after meeting Auguste Rodin, he decided to become a sculptor.

After returning to St. Petersburg, he worked in a jewelry company, where he created models for human and animal figurines. In the summers he returned home and worked mainly on portraits. In 1903, he moved to Yekaterinburg, where he worked as an art teacher. At the same time, he also created portraits and statuettes. In 1907, he went to Italy and studied the technology of bronze casting and marble processing in Florence, becoming acquainted with the works of Italian old masters. From 1909 he lived in St. Petersburg, and was a teacher at the Stiglitz Central School of Technical Drawing (1918–1919).

With the outbreak of the First World War in 1914, he signed his works with the pseudonym Zaļkalns, which is a direct translation from German into Latvian of the surname "Grinberg". In 1930, the pseudonym became the official name of the sculptor.

In 1918–1919, together with his compatriots, Ernests Štālbergs, Kārlis Zāle, Gustavs Šķilters, Jānis Tilbergs and Burkards Dzenis, he participated in the practical implementation of the Lenin's Plan of "Monumental Propaganda".

During this period he created and installed two monuments, one to the democratic revolutionary Nikolai Chernyshevsky and to the member of the Paris Commune, Auguste Blanqui. He also created models of monuments to composers Modest Mussorgsky and Alexander Scriabin and revolutionary lieutenant Pyotr Schmidt.

In 1920, he returned to Latvia, lived and worked in Riga where he founded the artists' association Sadarbs. He participated in the competitions for two monuments of Riga, the Brothers' Graves (1921–1922) and the Freedom Monument (1922–1929), but lost in the competition with Kārlis Zāle. He wrote a collection of poetry called "Poems" which were published in 1924.

In 1930, he Latvianized his surname from Grīnbergs to Zaļkalns.

He created busts of the writer Jānis Akurāteras (1929) and poet Aspazija (1931), the tombstone of the poet Jānis Poruks in the Meža cemetery in Riga and the Fricis Bārda monument in the Umurgas cemetery. In Kazdang, a monument carved by him to Yuri Māteru was installed, and in Plācī a tab for those who fell in the First World War (1931).

A multi-meter sculpture of a pig, which could also be perceived as a symbol of Latvian bacon, was planned to be installed in the Central Market in 1937, but this plan was not implemented.

In 1938, a monument to Atis Kronvalds designed by him was unveiled at the then Writers' House in Sigulda.

After the Second World War, he cooperated with the new authorities Soviet-occupied Latvia. The Soviets glorified his works and he did not object. Immediately after the restoration of Soviet power in 1944, Załkalns became a member of the Union of Artists. Fron 1947 to 1958 he was head of the Faculty of Sculpture of the Art Academy of Latvia and its professor since 1947. He was elected a Deputy of the Supreme Soviet of the Latvian SSR from 1947 to 1953 and a member of the Academy of Arts of the Latvian SSR from 1947. He was awarded several honorary titles: Peoples' Artist of Latvia (1945), People's Visual Artist of the USSR (1957) and Hero of Socialist Labor (1971).

== Gallery ==
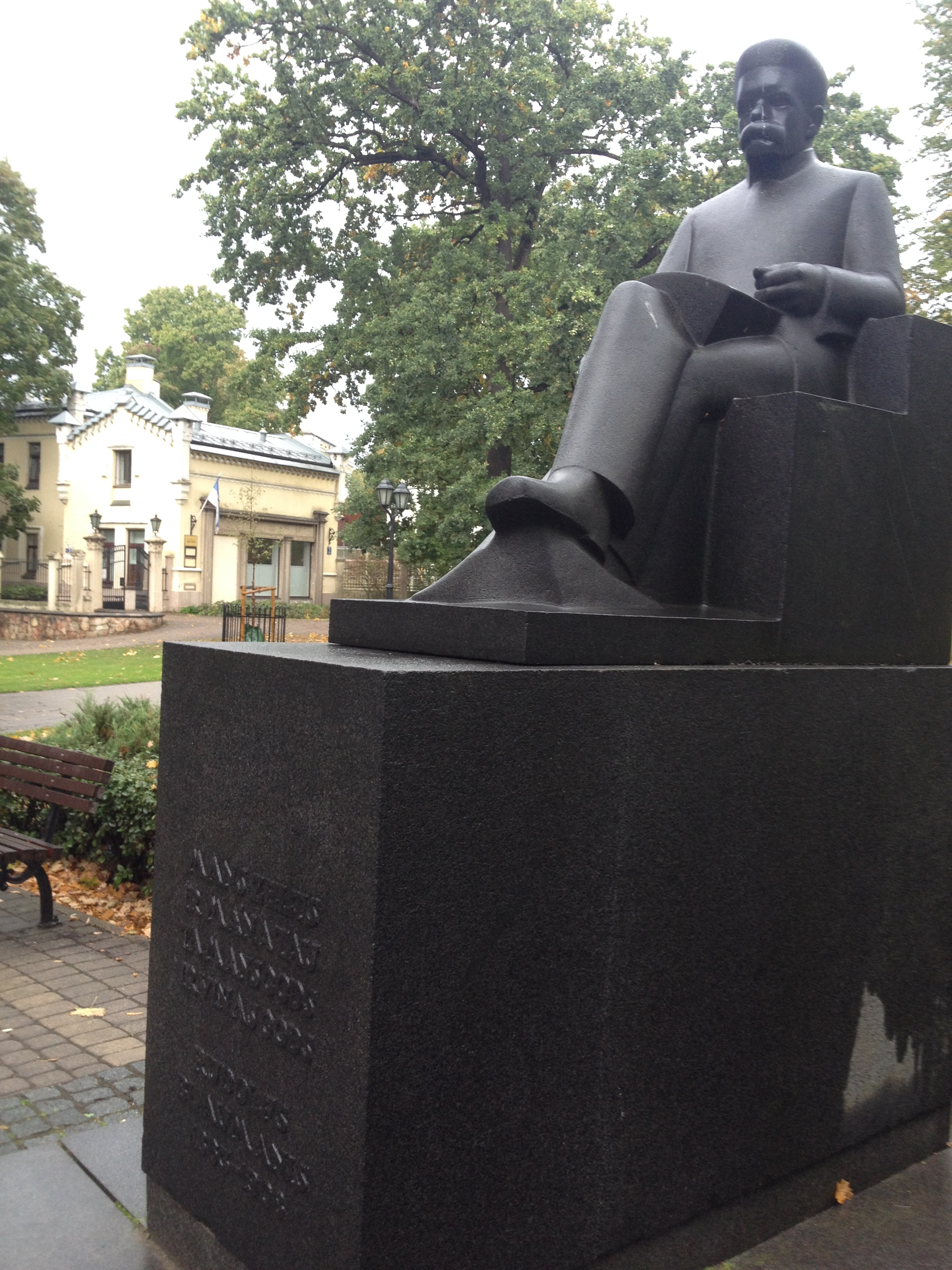
Monument to Rūdolfs Blaumanis

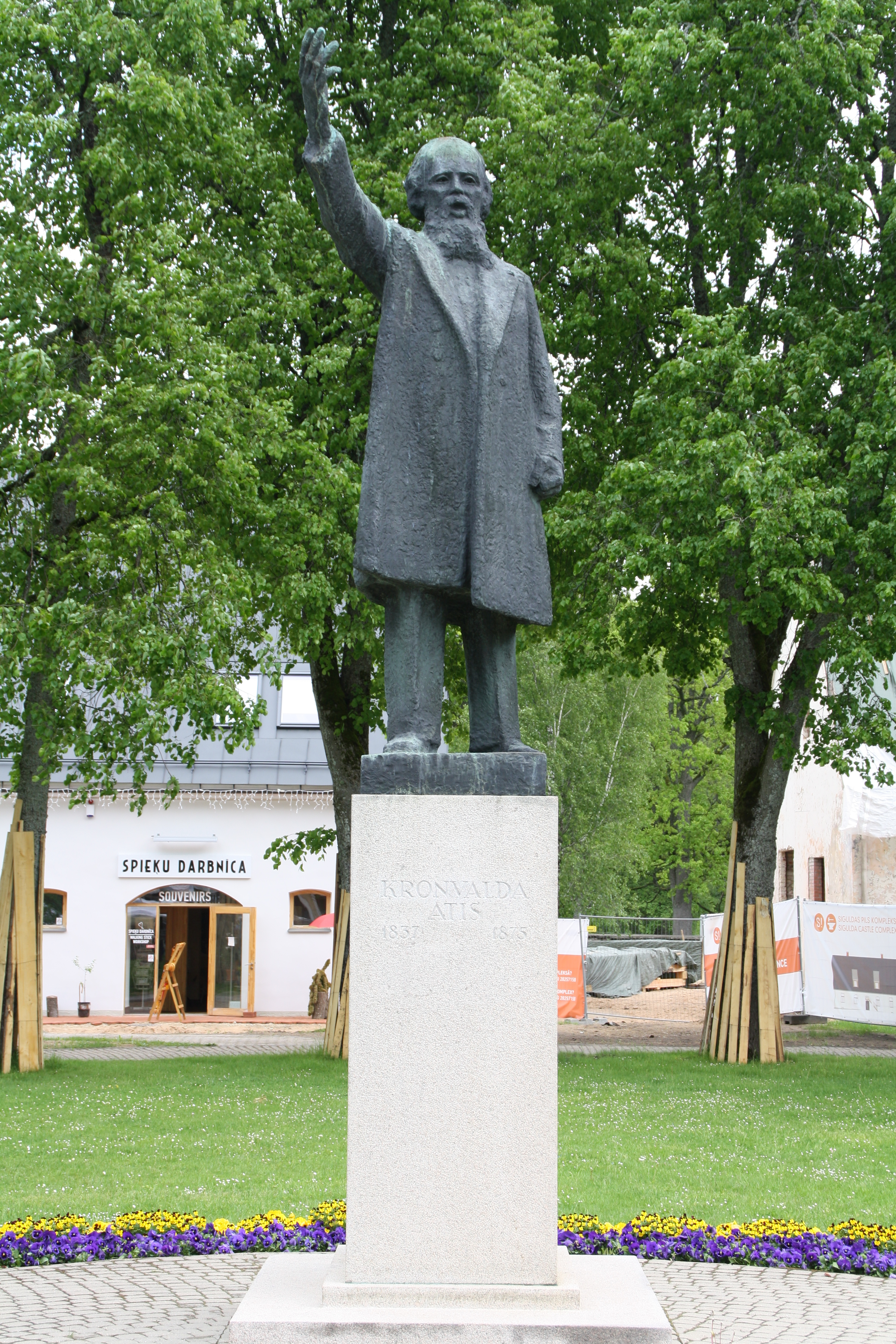
Monument to Atis Kronvald (Sigulda)
