= Bartholda van Swieten =

Dutch noble and diplomat

Bartholda van Swieten (2 April 1566, The Hague – 15 October 1647, The Hague) was a Dutch noble and diplomat who acted as official mediary between the Netherlands and the Spanish Netherlands from 1615 until 1629. She is the subject of fiction, a play and the Dutch novel Een haagsche joffer (1856). Her career as a diplomat was highly unusual for her gender in 17th-century Europe.

== Life ==
Van Swieten was the daughter of Adriaan van Swieten (1532–1584), governor of Gouda, and Josina van Naaldwijk (1540–1575). She married Floris T'Serclaes (1540–1612), bailiff of Schoonhoven, in 1588. She was a Catholic and belonged to a family who left the south after having sided with the Protestants, but after the peace of 1609 she travelled back and forth between the free and the Spanish Netherlands, as she had property in the Spanish Netherlands, where her daughters also lived.

Van Swieten's frequent travels and good connections made her a popular messenger between the two territories, and in 1615, she was given the title General Director by the Netherlands when she was asked to handle an assignment regarding a valuable carpet. In 1621, she handled the negotiations between the ruler of the Netherlands, Maurice, Prince of Orange, and the regent of the Spanish Netherlands, Albert VII, Archduke of Austria in Brussels, regarding the authority over some of the provinces. After this, she was regularly used as a diplomat and a messenger between the two courts; she was given the formal authority to issue negotiations about matters of state, and her expenses were covered by the state. In 1624, she was responsible for a negotiation regarding a prisoner exchange. Her last paid assignment was performed in 1629. She died in The Hague.

France was impressed by van Swieten's ability, and Archduke Albert worked well with her, but Venice ridiculed her, and her assignments there were rarely successful, as the tension between the two territories was too great at this point.

== See also ==
- Catharina Stopia, another contemporary female diplomat
