= Vālodzes =

Village in Latvia

Coordinates: 56.9408°N 24.2861°E

Vālodzes is a village in Stopiņi Parish, Ropaži Municipality in the Vidzeme region and the Riga Planning Region of Latvia.
