= Dzidriņas =

Village in Latvia

Coordinates: 56°56′30″N 24°19′26″E

Dzidriņas is a village in Stopiņi Parish, Ropaži Municipality in the Vidzeme region and the Riga Planning Region of Latvia.
