= Daniels Ontužāns =

Latvian footballer

Personal information
- Date of birth: 7 March 2000 (age 26)
- Place of birth: Vangaži, Latvia
- Height: 1.73 m (5 ft 8 in)
- Position: Midfielder

Team information
- Current team: FC Homburg
- Number: 14

Youth career
- JFC Skonto
- 2008–2010: FC Augsburg
- 2010–2019: Bayern Munich

Senior career*
Years	Team	Apps	(Gls)
2019–2021	Bayern Munich II	4	(0)
2020	→ St. Gallen II (loan)	0	(0)
2020–2021	Bayern Munich	0	(0)
2021–2023	SC Freiburg II	32	(3)
2023	RFS	9	(2)
2023	RFS II	2	(0)
2024–	FC Homburg	7	(0)

International career^{‡}
2019–	Latvia	7	(0)
- * Club domestic league appearances and goals as of 12:23, 17 July 2024 (UTC) ‡ National team caps and goals as of 6 June 2020

Daniels Ontužāns (born 7 March 2000) is a Latvian professional footballer who plays as a midfielder for Regionalliga Südwest side FC Homburg and the Latvia national team.

== Club career ==
Ontužāns began his youth career with JFC Skonto in Latvia, before joining the youth team of FC Augsburg after having moved to Germany. In 2010, he joined the youth academy of fellow Bavarian club Bayern Munich. Having moved into Bayern's under-19 team, in May 2018 he signed a new three-year contract lasting until 30 June 2021. Ontužāns made one appearance on the bench for Bayern's reserve team during the 2018–19 season. In June 2019, he was promoted to the Bayern's reserve team for the 2019–20 season in the 3. Liga. Ontužāns made his first appearance for the reserve team on 21 February 2021, during the 2020–21 season.

On 14 July 2023, Ontužāns moved back to his home country. He signed a contract with FK RFS.

== International career ==
Ontužāns previously trained with the under-15 and under-16 German youth selections.

On 27 May 2019, Ontužāns received his first call-up to the Latvia national team for the UEFA Euro 2020 qualifying matches against Israel and Slovenia. He made his international debut on 10 June 2019, coming on as a substitute in the 78th minute for Deniss Rakels in the match against Slovenia, which finished as a 5–0 home loss.

== Personal life ==
Ontužāns was born in Vangaži, Latvia, but he moved to Augsburg with his parents, who relocated to Germany for work, when he was eight.

== Career statistics ==
=== Club ===
As of match played 1 July 2022

Appearances and goals by club, season and competition
Club	Season	League			Cup		Total	
Club	Season	Division	Apps	Goals	Apps	Goals	Apps	Goals
Bayern Munich II	2018–19	Regionalliga Bayern	0	0	—		0	0
Bayern Munich II	2020–21	3. Liga	4	0	—		4	0
Bayern Munich II	Total		4	0	—		4	0
Bayern Munich	2020–21	Bundesliga	0	0	1	0	1	0
SC Freiburg II	2021–22	3. Liga	22	2	—		22	2
Career total			26	2	1	0	27	2

=== International ===
As of 17 November 2020

Appearances and goals by national team and year
National team	Year	Apps	Goals
Latvia	2019	2	0
Latvia	2020	3	0
Total		5	0
