= Viktors Morozs =

Latvian footballer and coach

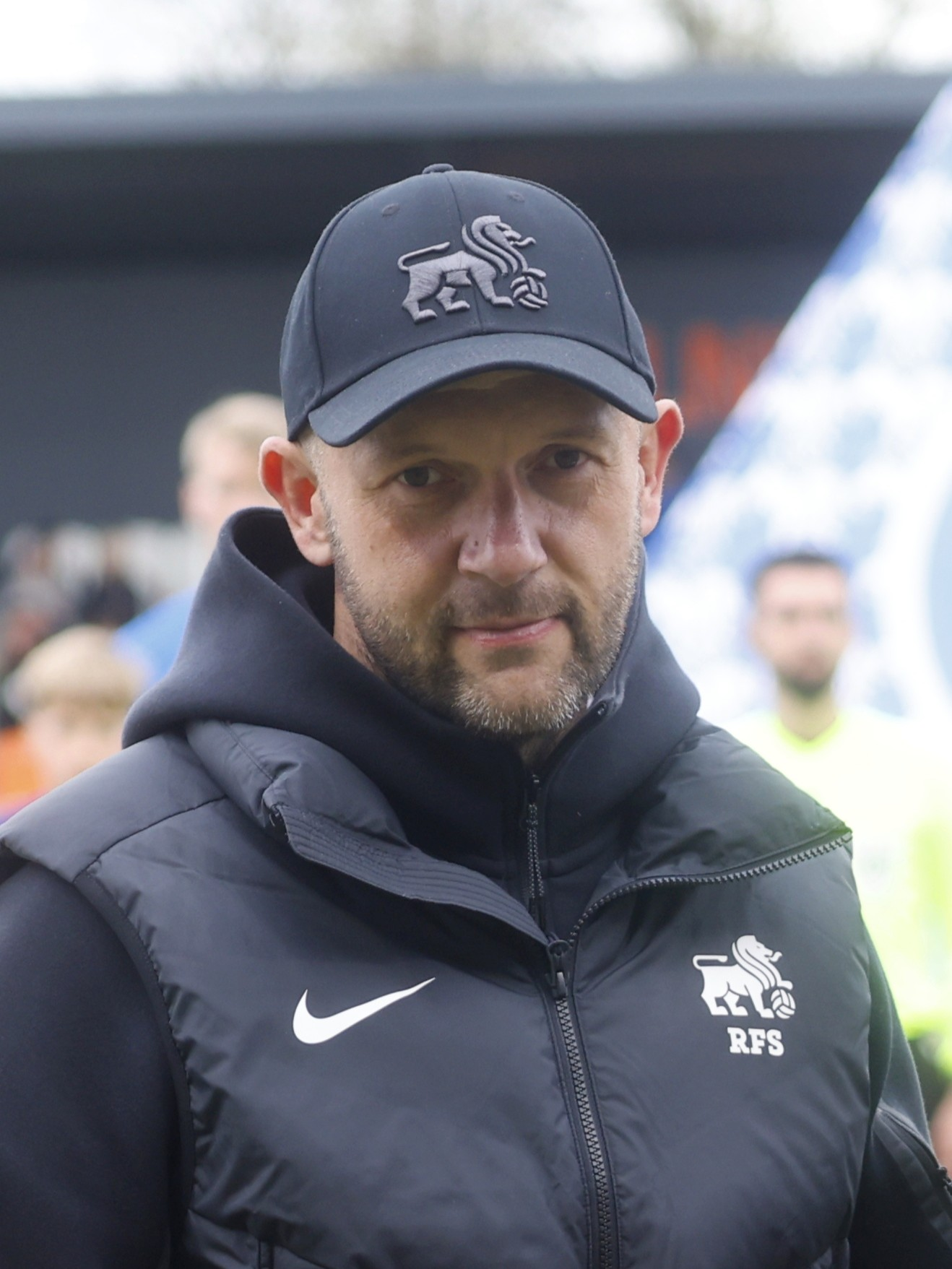
- Morozs in 2026

Personal information
- Full name: Viktors Morozs
- Date of birth: 30 July 1980 (age 46)
- Place of birth: Vangaži, Latvian SSR, Soviet Union (now Republic of Latvia)
- Height: 1.86 m (6 ft 1 in)
- Position: Midfielder

Team information
- Current team: RFS (manager)

Youth career
- Valmiera

Senior career*
Years	Team	Apps	(Gls)
1997–1999	Valmiera	5	(0)
1999–2000	Skonto Riga	9	(1)
2000	Valmiera	4	(0)
2001–2008	Skonto Rīga	137	(15)
2008–2010	CSKA Sofia	22	(2)
2010–2011	Atromitos Yeroskipou	23	(7)
2011–2012	PAEEK	23	(3)
2012–2013	Spartaks Jūrmala	37	(5)
2013	Naftan Novopolotsk	12	(2)
2014	Skonto Rīga	32	(4)
Total		304	(39)

International career
2002–2014	Latvia	24	(0)

Managerial career
- 2020–: RFS
- * Club domestic league appearances and goals

Viktors Morozs (born 30 July 1980) is a Latvian professional football manager and former player as a midfielder. He is currently the manager of Latvian Higher League club RFS.

== Club career ==
Morozs started his career in Valmiera. Between 2001 and 2008, he played in 122 matches for Skonto Riga and scored 15 goals. On 3 August 2008, he signed for two years with Bulgarian champions CSKA Sofia. In summer 2010, he was released from the team, and after a two-month period of being a free agent, he signed a one-year contract with Atromitos Yeroskipou, playing in the Cypriot Second Division. In 2011, Morozs moved to the Cypriot Second Division club PAEEK. Before the start of the 2012 season, he returned to Latvia, joining the Latvian Higher League club Spartaks Jūrmala. As the club's captain, Morozs played 37 league matches and scored five goals across two seasons. In July 2013, he was released. In August 2013, Morozs joined Belarusian Premier League club Naftan Novopolotsk. In March 2014, Latvian Higher League club Skonto Rīga announced the signing of Morozs, as he returned to the club he had already played for from 2001 to 2008.

== International career ==
Morozs made his debut for Latvia in a friendly match against Azerbaijan on 6 July 2002. In October 2014, Morozs was recalled to the national team for the first time since March 2007 for the UEFA Euro 2016 qualification matches against Iceland and Turkey. He has played 24 international matches, scoring no goals.

== Career statistics ==
=== International ===
Appearances and goals by national team and year
National team	Year	Apps	Goals
Latvia	2002	2	0
Latvia	2003	0	0
Latvia	2004	2	0
Latvia	2005	12	0
Latvia	2006	3	0
Latvia	2007	3	0
Latvia	2008	0	0
Latvia	2009	0	0
Latvia	2010	0	0
Latvia	2011	0	0
Latvia	2012	0	0
Latvia	2013	0	0
Latvia	2014	2	0
Total		24	0

== Managerial statistics ==
As of 21 February 2026

Managerial record by team and tenure
Team	Nat	From	To	Record							
Team	Nat	From	To	G	W	D	L	GF	GA	GD	Win %
RFS	(Latvia)	1 January 2020	Present	271	180	46	45	642	246	+396	66.42
Career total				271	180	46	45	642	246	+396	66.42

== Honours ==
=== Player ===
Skonto Riga

- Latvian Higher League: 2000, 2001, 2002, 2003, 2004
- Latvian Cup: 2000, 2001, 2002

=== Managerial ===
RFS

- Latvian Higher League: 2021, 2023, 2024, 2026
- Latvian Cup: 2021, 2024
