= Mazā Jugla =

River in Latvia

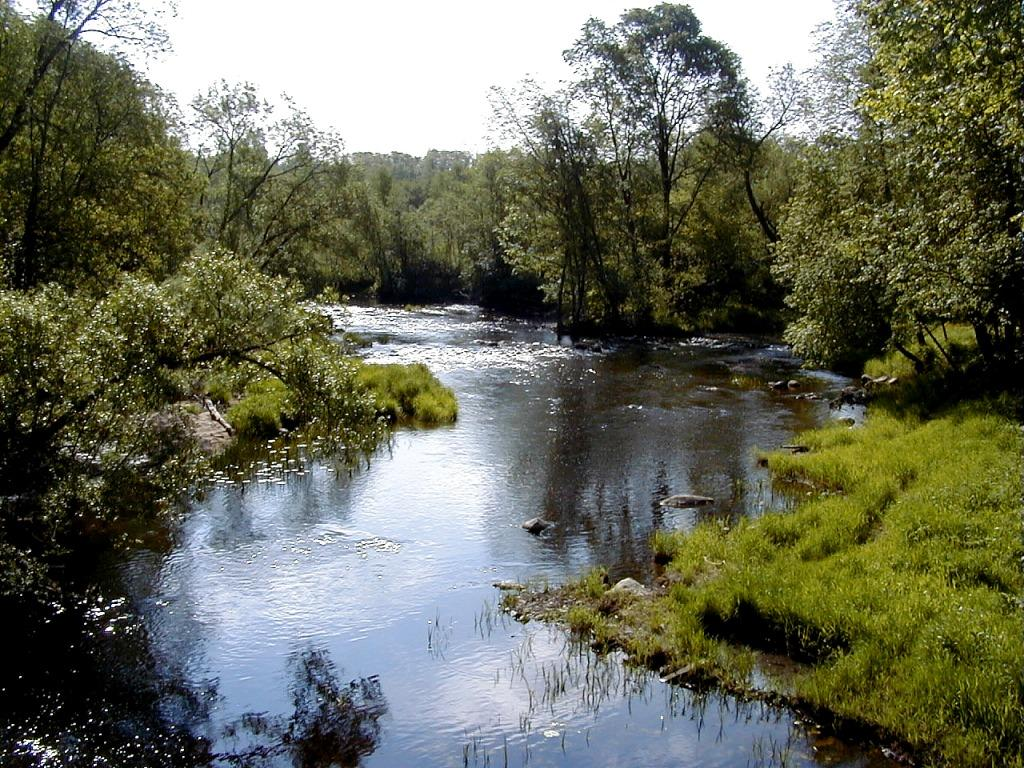
- Mazā Jugla near Kranciems

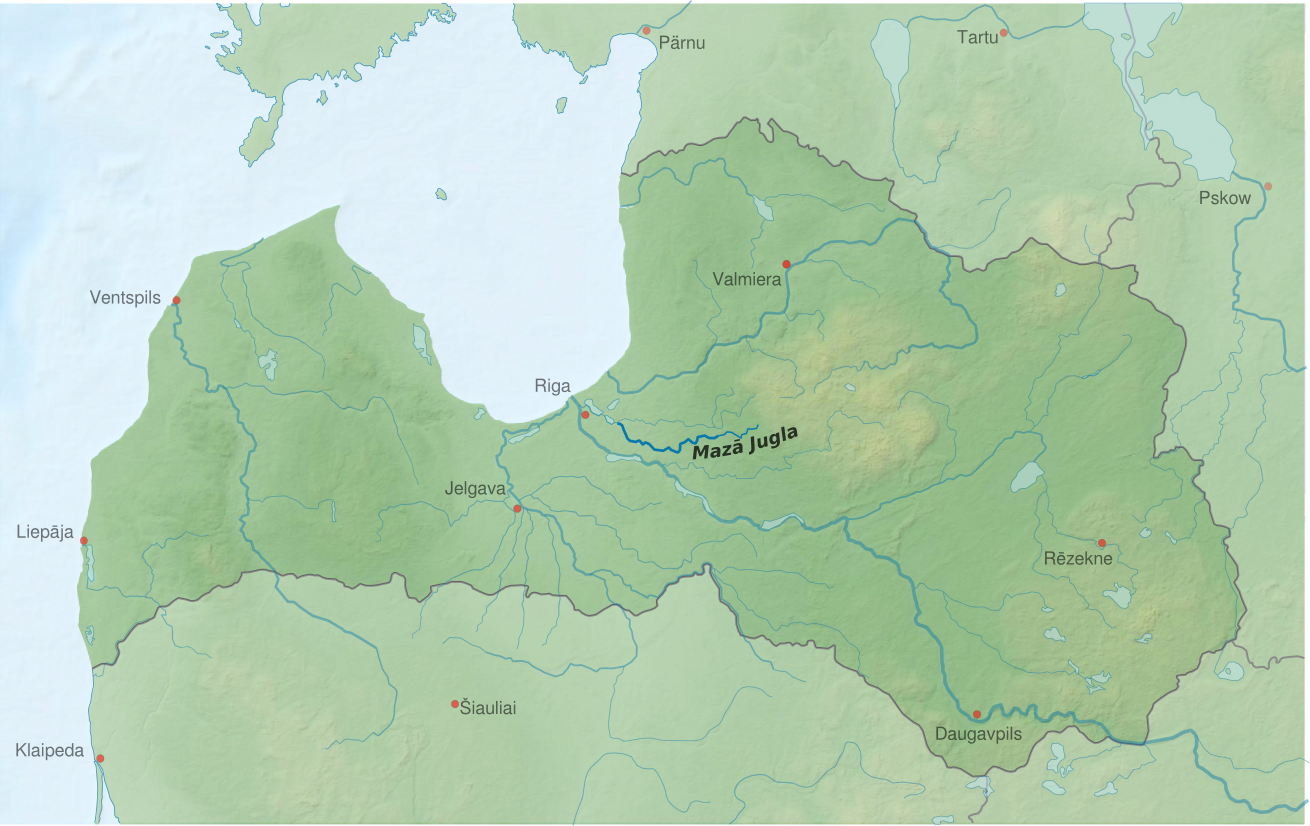

Location
- Country: Latvia

Physical characteristics
- Source
  - location: Taurupe parish, Ogre Municipality, Latvia
  - elevation: 112 m (367 ft)
- Mouth: Jugla
  - location: near Riga
  - coordinates: 56°58′10″N 24°19′24″E
- Length: 119 km (74 mi)
- Basin size: 675.3 km^{2} (260.7 sq mi)

Basin features
- Progression: Jugla→ Ķīšezers→ Mīlgrāvis→ Daugava→ Baltic Sea

Mazā Jugla (previously German: Kleine Jägel) is a river in Latvia. It flows for 119 kilometres through the municipalities of Ogre, Salaspils, Ikšķile and Stopiņi. The source of the river is located in Taurupe parish, Ogre Municipality 130 m above sea level, whereas the mouth is 0.1 m asl.

Mazā Jugla joins with Lielā Jugla thus forming the river Jugla shortly before its mouth into Jugla Lake at the Riga city eastern border with the municipalities of Garkalne and Stopiņi. The river is curvy with many rapids and weirs, with dolomite and sandstone outcrops on its banks, and is a popular water tourism site. The Dobelnieki hydroelectric plant is located on the river.

The Battle of Jugla of World War I between the German and Russian armies took place on the banks of the river in 1917.

== See also ==
- List of rivers of Latvia
