= Zaķumuiža =

Village in Latvia

- Village
- Zaķumuiža's location in Latvia
- Coordinates: 56°58′10″N 24°29′0″E
- Country: Latvia
- Municipality: Ropaži

Area
  - Total: 1.7 sq mi (4.4 km^{2})

Population
  - Total: 1,043
  - Density: 610/sq mi (237/km^{2})

Zaķumuiža (German: Waldenrode) is a village in Ropaži Municipality in the Vidzeme region of Latvia. Zaķumuiža had 900 residents as of 2006.
