= Vangaži =

Town in Ropaži Municipality, Latvia

- Town
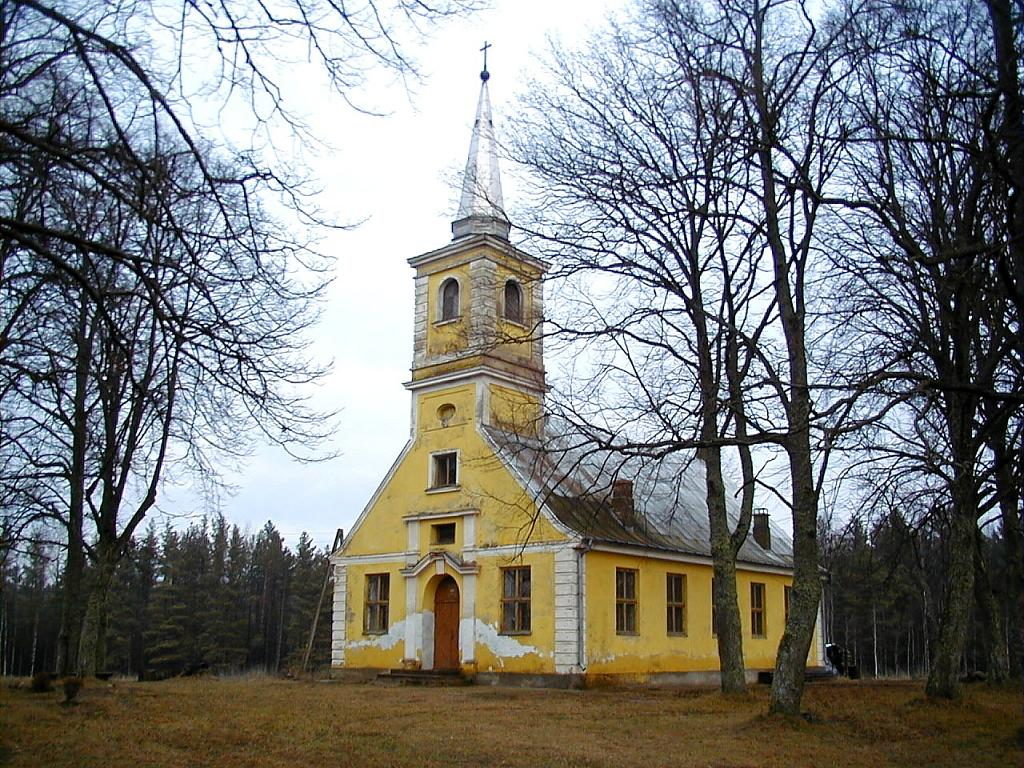
- Lutheran church in Vangaži

- Coat of arms

- Location in Latvia
- Coordinates: 57°5′33″N 24°32′47″E
- Country: Latvia
- Municipalities: Ropaži Municipality
- Town rights: 1991

Area
  - Total: 5.19 km^{2} (2.00 sq mi)
  - Land: 5.09 km^{2} (1.97 sq mi)
  - Water: 0.1 km^{2} (0.039 sq mi)

Population (2026)
  - Total: 3,049
  - Density: 599/km^{2} (1,550/sq mi)
- Time zone: UTC+2 (EET)
  - Summer (DST): UTC+3 (EEST)
- Postal code: LV-2136
- Calling code: +371 67
- Website: www.vangazi.lv

Vangaži is a town in Ropaži Municipality in the Vidzeme region of Latvia.

== History ==
The name Vangaži (German: Wangasch) was first mentioned in the 17th century as the name of a local manor. The name itself is a combination of two words in the Livonian language - vang (field) and aži (place). Since the 17th century there was also a Lutheran church in Vangaži. Close to the modern town of Vangaži there were several manufactures which produced paper, glass and copper products.

The modern town started in the 1950s when the concrete factory was founded. In 1957 the village Oktobra ciemats ('October Village') was founded which in 1961 was renamed to Vangaži. In 1992 Vangaži was granted the status of a town.

== Sports ==
From 1968 to 1991 Vangaži had a relatively strong football club - known at first as Celtnieks Vangaži, then renamed to Betons Vangaži. With the bankruptcy of the concrete factory the football club was disbanded. Latvia national football team footballer Viktors Morozs is the most notable footballer from Vangaži.

== See also ==
- List of cities in Latvia
- Ropaži Municipality#Notable people
