= Rumbula, Ropaži Municipality =

Village in Latvia

Coordinates: 56°53′N 24°15′E

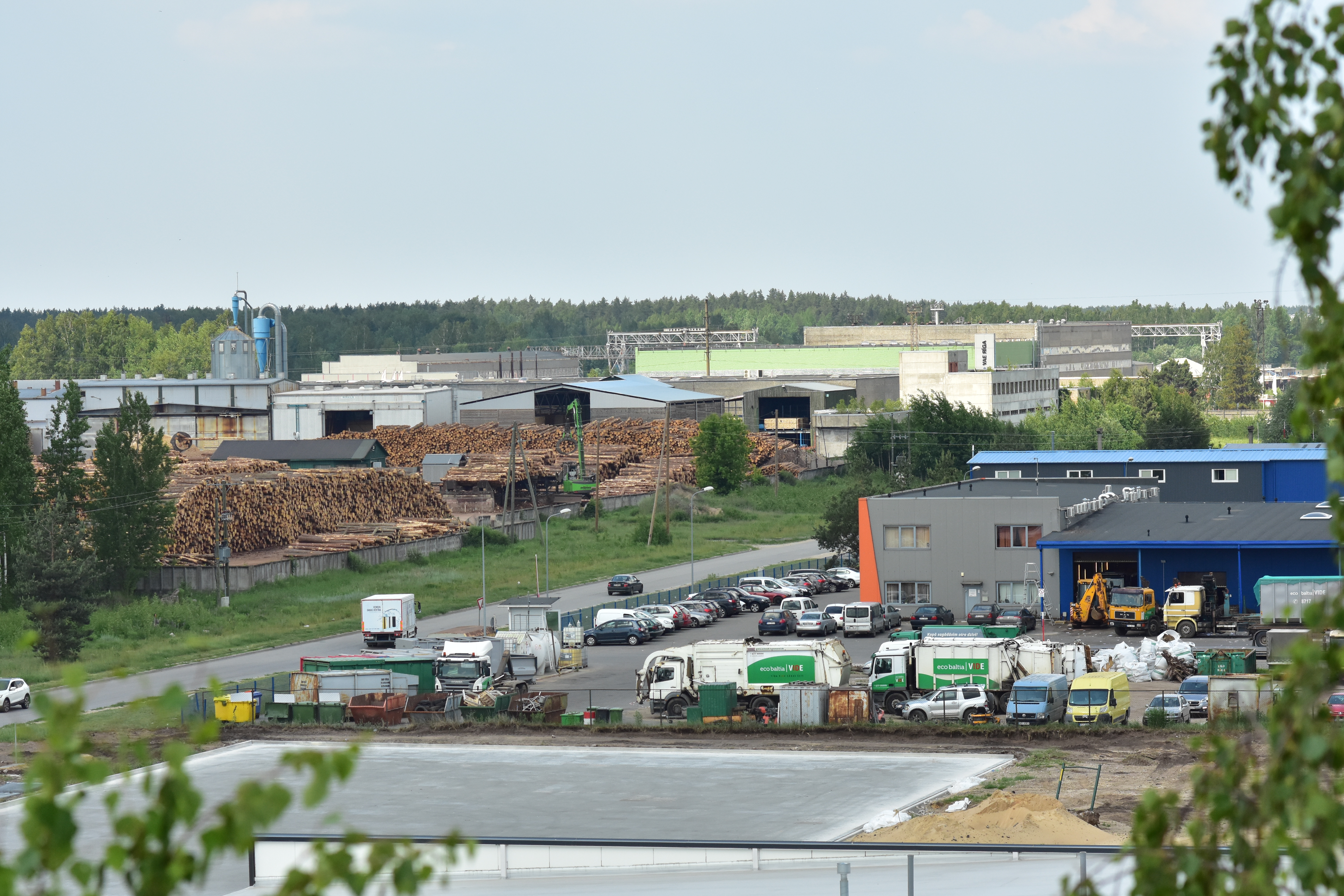
Rumbula (village)

Rumbula is a village in Stopiņi Parish, Ropaži Municipality in the Vidzeme region and the Riga Planning Region of Latvia.
