= Ropaži =

Village in Latvia

- Village
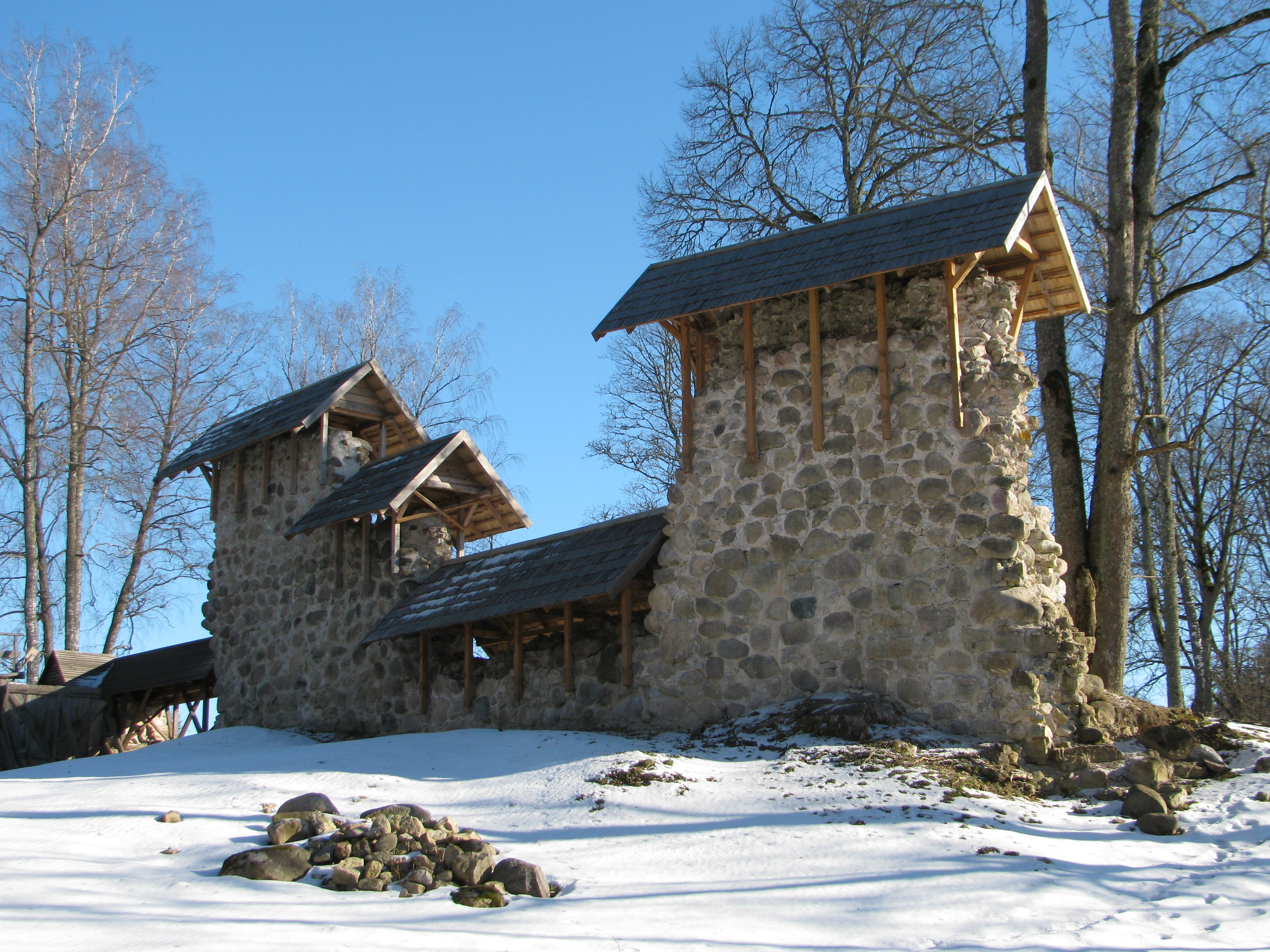
- Ruins of Ropaži Castle in Ropaži

- Ropaži location inside Latvia
- Coordinates: 56°58′18.54″N 24°37′54.35″E
- Country: Latvia
- Municipality: Ropaži
- First time mentioned: 1205

Area
  - Total: 2.22 sq mi (5.75 km^{2})

Population (2009)
  - Total: 1,803
  - Density: 534/sq mi (206.3/km^{2})

Ropaži (German: Rodenpois) is a village in the Vidzeme region of Latvia, located in Ropaži Municipality. The village located approximately 36 km from the capital Riga.

== Notable people ==
- Tomass Štolcermanis (born 2007), racing driver
