= Ulbroka =

Village and capital of Ropaži Municipality, Latvia

- Village
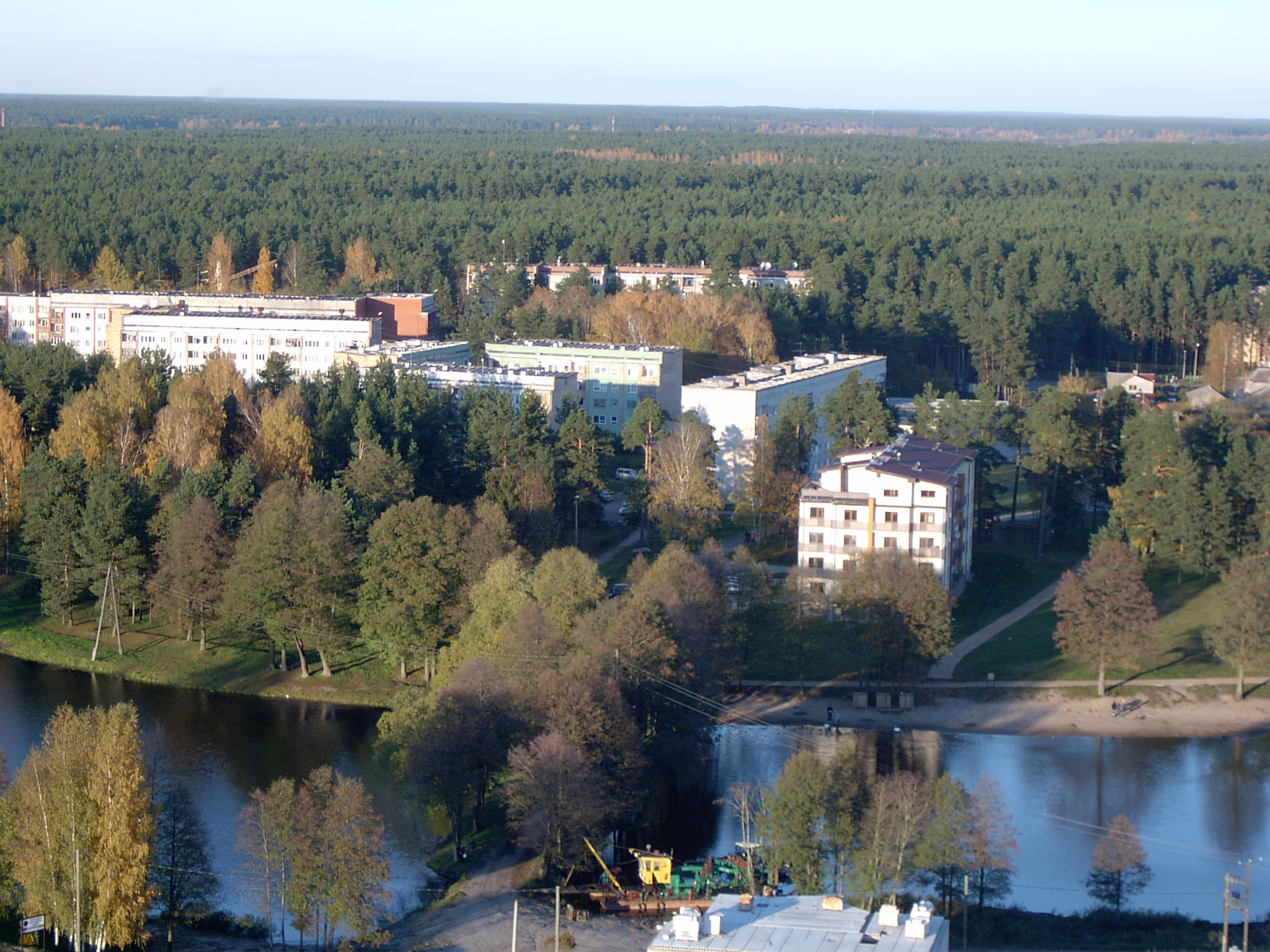
- View of Ulbroka over the Lake of Ulbroka

- Location in Latvia
- Coordinates: 56°56′N 24°17′E
- Country: Latvia
- Municipality: Ropaži Municipality

Population (2026)
  - Total: 6,084
- Time zone: UTC+2 (EET)
  - Summer (DST): UTC+3 (EEST)
- Postal code: LV-2130
- Calling code: +371

Ulbroka is a large village in Stopiņi Parish, Ropaži Municipality in the Vidzeme region of Latvia. It is the administrative center of Ropaži Municipality and its Stopiņi Parish. Ulbroka is currently the largest village in Latvia per population. The village is crossed by two first category roads Rīga-Ērgļi (P4) and Rīga-Ogre (P5).

In 2000 Ulbroka had 2,701 inhabitants, rising to 3,102 in 2021.

== Etymology ==
The name Ulbroka comes from the burgomaster of Riga Hinrich von Ulenbrock II in the second half of the 16th century. Von Ulenbrock built the Ulbroka manor.

== Geography ==
The village is located in the Central Latvian lowlands, near Riga. The river flowing through Ulbroka - Piķurga was artificially expanded, creating the Lake of Ulbroka, once excavated as a large pond of manor, and then a mill lake. The Dauguļupīte stream flows into Piķurga in the north of the village.

The average temperature is -6 °C in January and + 17 °C in July. Precipitation drops 700 mm per year.

== Economy ==
The largest company registered in Ulbroka in terms of turnover in 2020 was the manufacturer of wooden packaging SIA "Kronus".

Next to Ulbroka is a medium-wave radio station.

The Riga city buses (Nr. 51) run to Ulbroka.

== Images ==
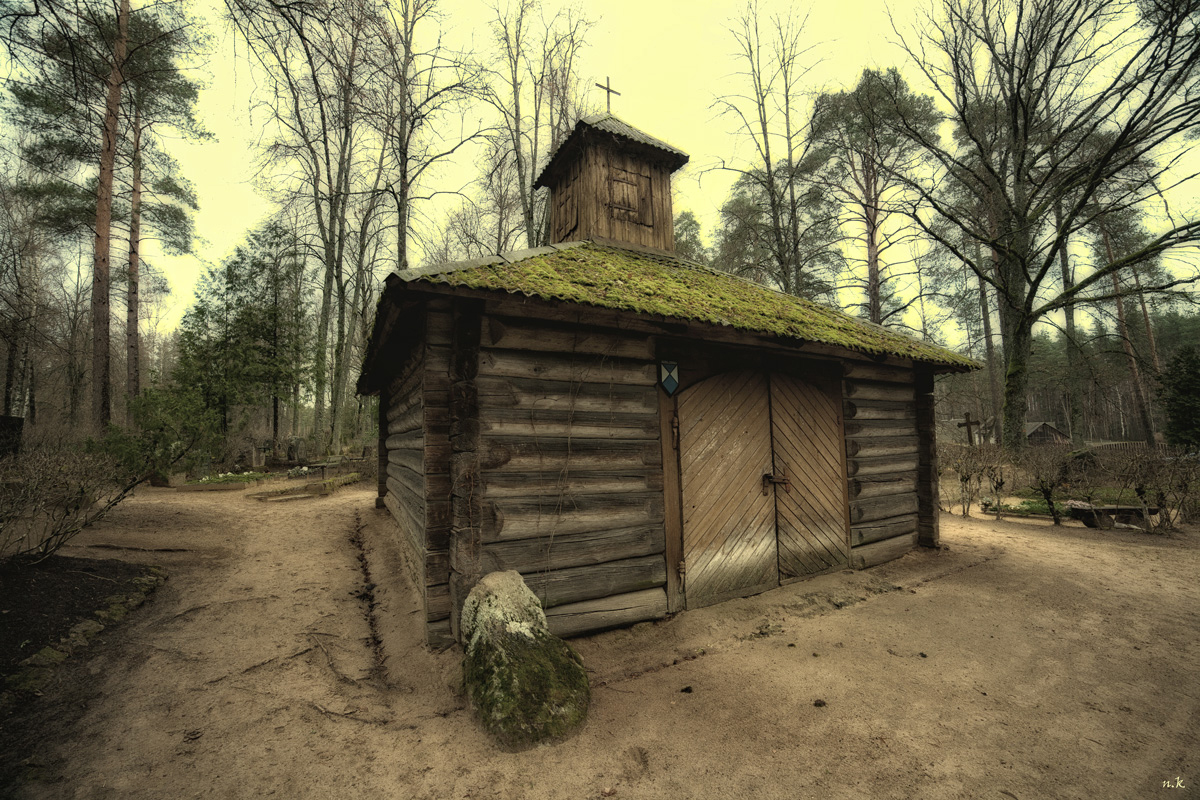
Cemetery chapel.

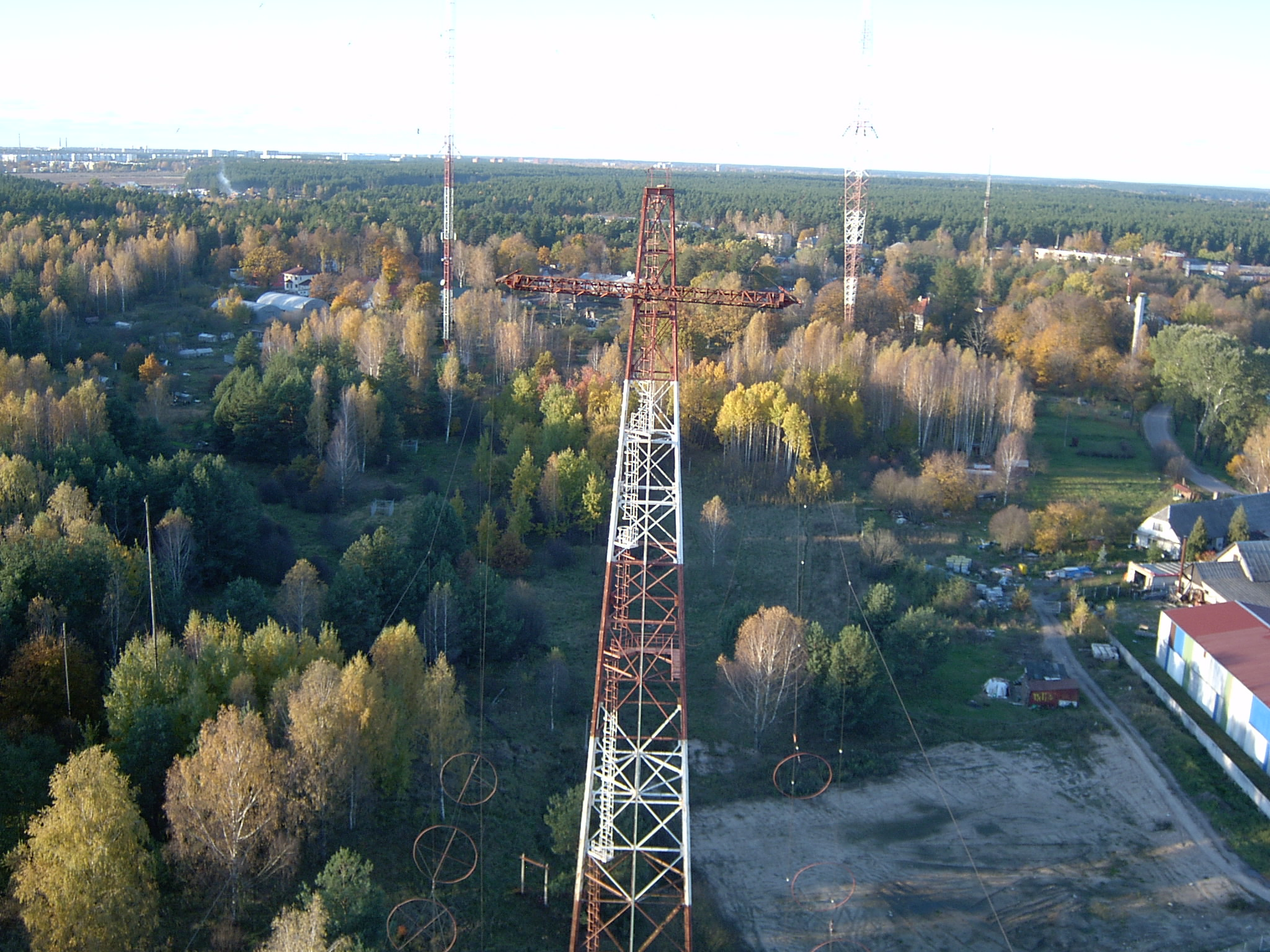
Ulbroka radio station in 2006.

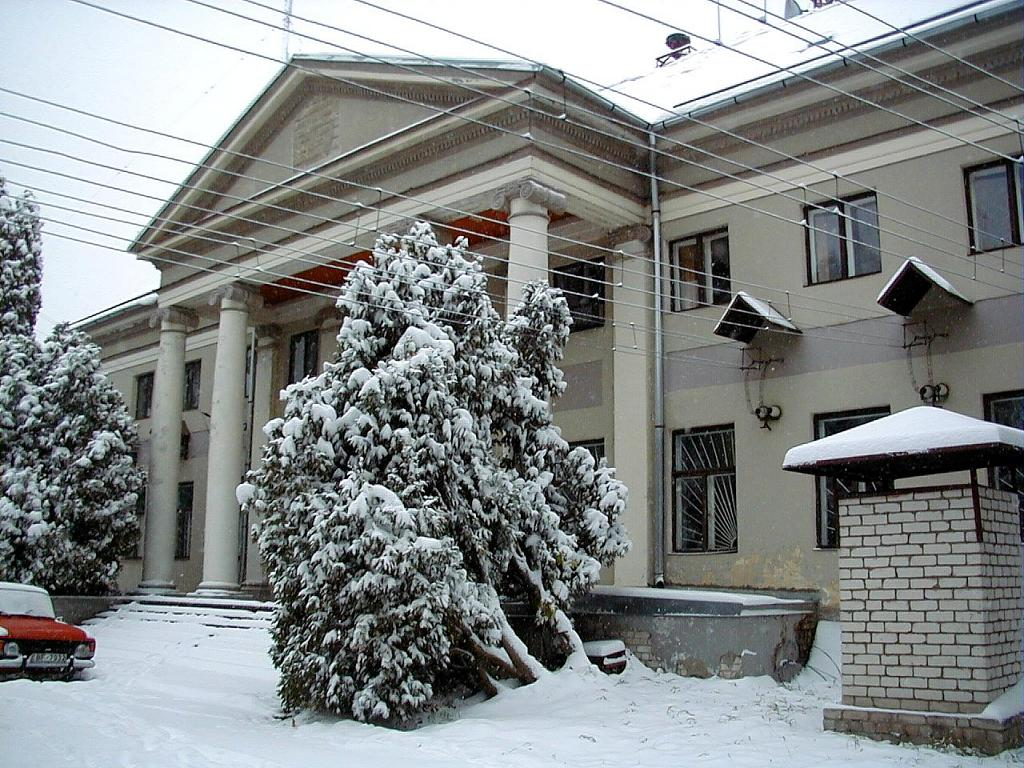
Ulbroka manor.

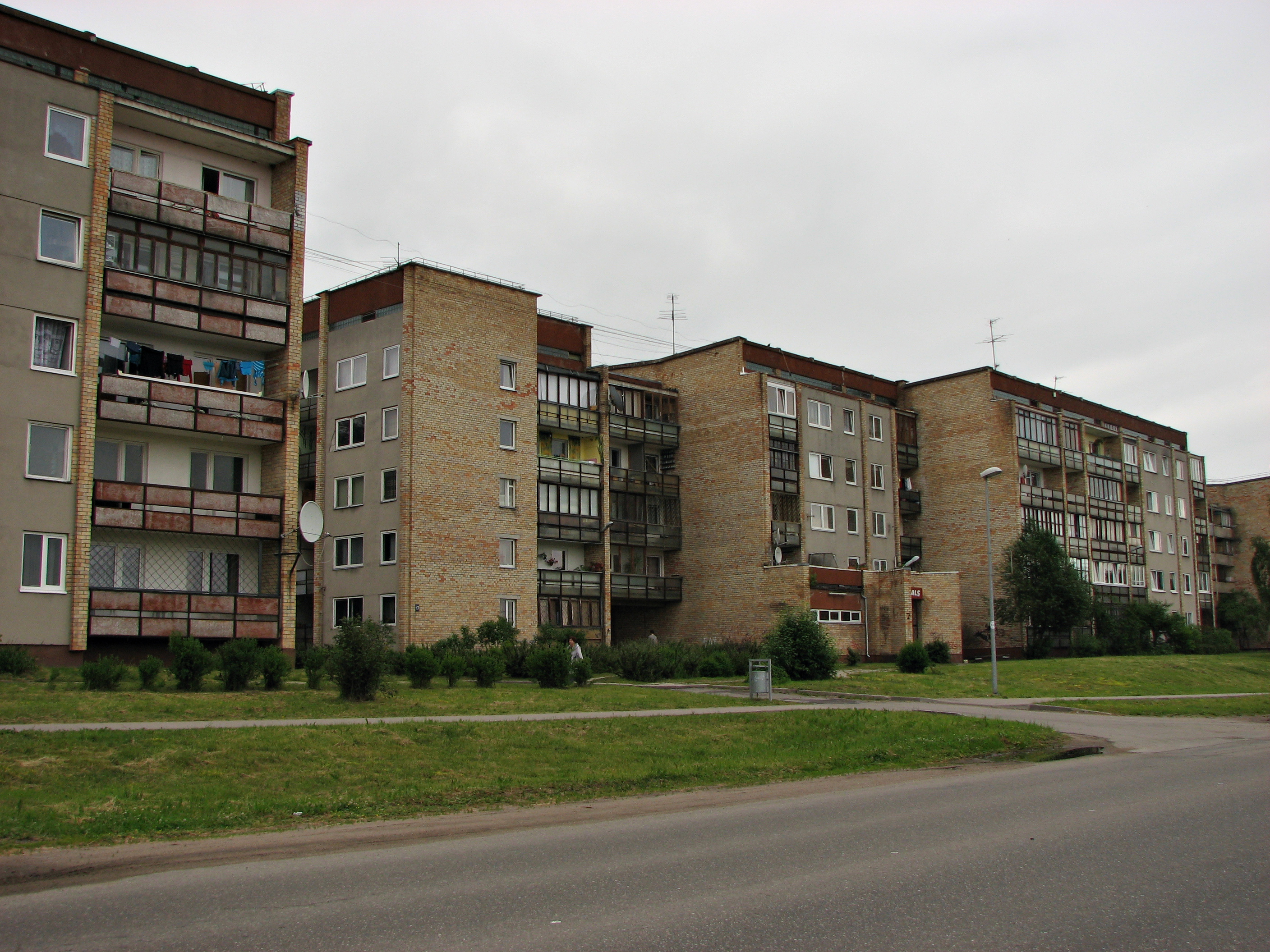
Residential buildings.

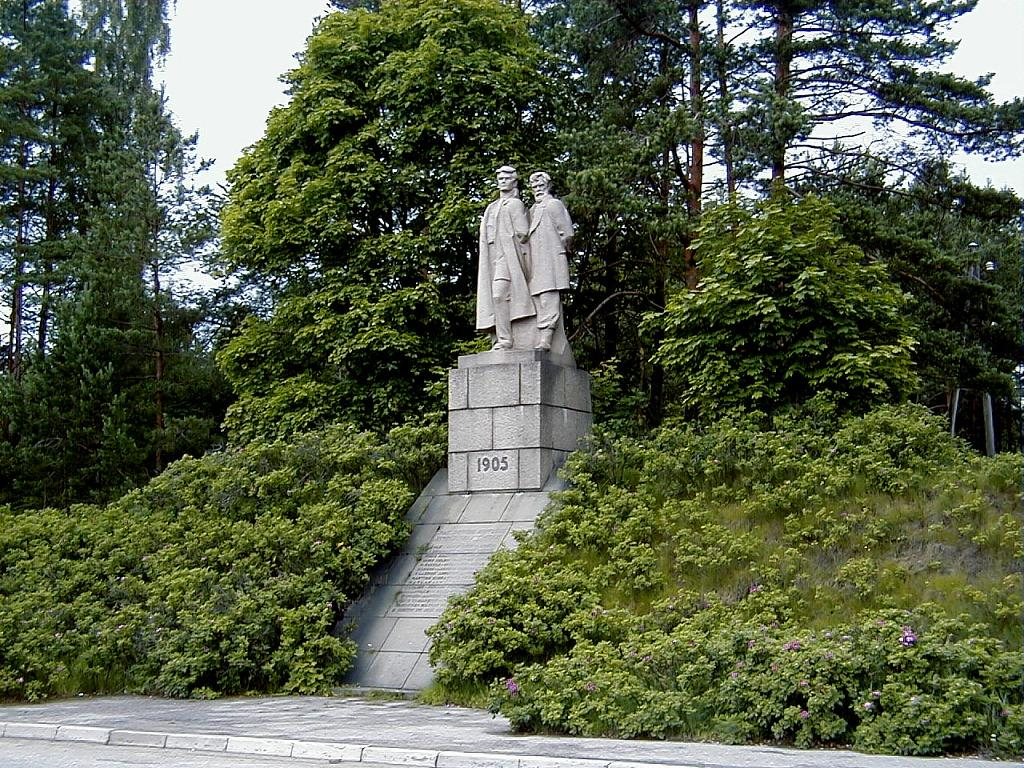
Monument to the Revolution of 1905.
