= Burkards Dzenis =

Latvian painter (1879–1966)

Burkards Dzenis (1879, Dreiliņi, Governorate of Livonia, Russian Empire – 1966, Dayton, Ohio) was a Latvian artist.

== Biography ==
Burkards Dzenis was born in the outskirts of Riga and spent his first years in the city. He decided to become an artist because of the impression that two statues at the entrance to his school made on him, early in his life. In 1897 he moved to Saint Petersburg to study to become a sculptor at the Saint Petersburg Art and Industry Academy. There he came in contact with other young Latvian artists, including his own cousin Teodors Zaļkalns and Rūdolfs Pērle, and joined the association of young artists known as Rūķis. He remained a member of the group until 1905. In Saint Petersburg he came in contact with a wider art scene and took influences from both the rich collections of the Hermitage Museum and through temporary exhibitions displaying contemporary art, among them the works of Auguste Rodin. Dzenis subsequently adopted a modern aesthetic and committed himself to the ideals of artistic renewal around the turn of the century. After having obtained his art diploma from the academy in 1905, he spend one year in Paris thanks to a scholarship, and subsequently traveled to Berlin and Moscow. He then returned to Riga where he opened a large and modern atelier and worked as an independent artist. He was also active as an art teacher. From 1910, he regularly exhibited his works at art exhibitions in the city, and took active part in the development of the city's artistic life. Dzenis became an influential member of the Art Academy of Latvia and was director of the Latvian National Museum of Art between 1920 and 1944. Following the Soviet occupation of Latvia, he fled the country to the United States. Dzenis, his wife, Augusta, and children emigrated to the United States as displaced persons in 1950. They settled in the village of Gettysburg north of Dayton, Ohio where he continued to create works in clay, bronze, plaster of Paris and wood and to teach. In 1958 he moved to Dayton where he lived until his death in 1966.

In 2019 a documentary film was made of Dzenis' life and work.

== Artistic range ==
The artistic range of Burkards Dzenis was broad. An educated sculptor, he created not only sculpture in the round but also funerary monuments and portraits, and made designs for monumental memorials. In addition, he also designed jewelry, bank notes, stamps and book bindings. He is also credited with having designed the coat of arms of Latvia although other sources claim it was designed by Vilhelms Krūmiņš and Rihards Zariņš. Dzenis received several both national and international rewards in recognition of his work.
