= Ropaži Municipality =

Municipality of Latvia

Coordinates: 56°58′19″N 24°37′54″E

Ropaži Municipality Ropažu novads
- Municipality
- Flag Coat of arms

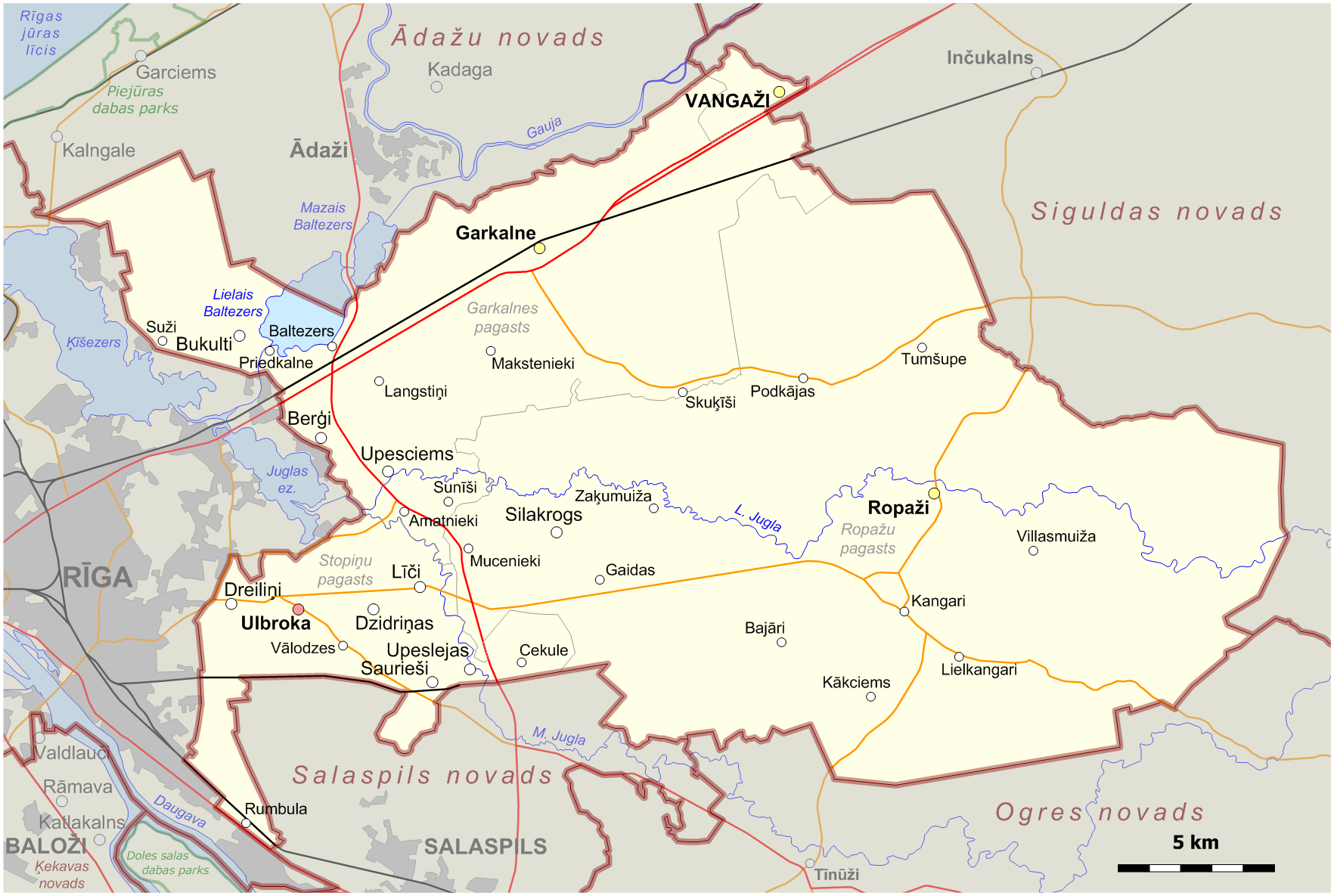
- Country: Latvia
- Formed: 2005
- Reformed: 2021
- Centre: Ulbroka

Government
  - Council Chair: Signe Grūbe (JV/PRO)

Area
  - Total: 536.13 km^{2} (207.00 sq mi)
  - Land: 511.42 km^{2} (197.46 sq mi)
  - Water: 24.71 km^{2} (9.54 sq mi)

Population (2026)
  - Total: 35,540
  - Density: 69.49/km^{2} (180.0/sq mi)
- Website: ropazi.lv

Ropaži Municipality (Latvian: Ropažu novads) is a municipality in Vidzeme, Latvia. The municipality was formed in 2005 with the reorganization of Ropaži parish. The administrative centre is Ulbroka. The population in 2020 was 6,835.

On 1 July 2021, Ropaži Municipality was enlarged when Garkalne Municipality, Stopiņi Municipality and Vangaži town were merged with it. The entire territory of Ropaži Municipality is defined by Latvian law as a part of the region of Vidzeme.

The center of Ulbroka is 14 km from Riga, the capital of Latvia.

== Statistics ==
Territory: 322 km^{2}.

Population: 6.832 inhabitants.

As of 1 January 2002 the largest villages are:

- Ropaži – 1900 inhabitants,
- Zaķumuiža – 1221 inhabitants,
- Silakrogs – 779 inhabitants,
- Mucenieki – 689 inhabitants,
- Tumšupe – 633 inhabitants,
- Kākciems – 513 inhabitants,
- Augšciems – 372 inhabitants.

== History ==
The territory of the Ropaži Municipality has been inhabited since the Stone Age – Neolithic era (3,000 years B.C.). 4 ancient cemeteries and stone objects have been discovered here.

The first written evidence of Ropaži and its inhabitants go back to 1205, when Henry of Livonia mentioned Ropaži in the Indriķis Chronicles. Ethnographer Augusts Bīlenšteins considered the inhabitants of the district to be Livs of the Daugava. In about 1320 the Livonian Order built a stone castle at Ropaži which served as the centre of the district administration. The castle was destroyed during the Livonian War in the 17th century.

In the 16th century one of the most important routes of Vidzeme led through Ropaži.

In the 18th century the baronial Berg family obtained Ropaži manor and carried out large construction works. The gardener Daniel Ebel formed one of the first garden parks of Latvia. In an area of 93,000 square metres 29 species of trees and bushes were planted.

In reports of 1736 we can find information about the education of children. In 1766 the parish school “Pārupes” was established. Two famous Latvians worked there: the writer and translator Augusts Kažoks, an adherent of "The New Current", and the poet Doku Atis.

On 18 August 1804 the clergyman C. von Walter described Professor Robertson's flight from Riga to Ropaži in a hot-air balloon.

In 1855 Ropaži manor became the property of Baron Victor von Wolf. At the beginning of the 19th century the Ropaži manor burned down.

Ropaži was seriously affected by World War I and World War II. In 1949 over 150 inhabitants suffered in Soviet repressions.

In 1936 Ropaži 7–grade Primary School was built; in 1960 it was transformed into a secondary school.

In Ropaži are many significant cultural and natural features:

- Kangari Hills – 65 m above sea level, and a restricted nature area of 6.72 km^{2}
- Lielkangari Marsh - 8.32 km^{2}
- Ancient cemetery – Stone Age
Coat of arms of Ropaži Municipality (2012–2021)

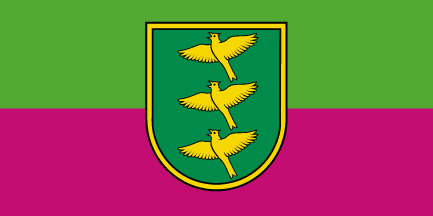
Flag of Ropaži Municipality (2012–2021)

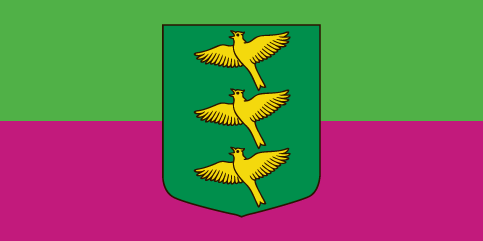
Flag of Ropaži Parish (until 2009)

== Notable people ==
- Burkards Dzenis (1879 in Dreiliņi – 1966), artist, director of the Latvian National Museum of Art, 1920 to 1944
- Jānis Sudrabkalns (1894 in Inčukalns – 1975), poet and writer and an academician of the Latvian Academy of Sciences
- Alberts Bels (1938 in Jaunmežplepji - 2024), a politically active writer and novelist
- Viktors Morozs (born 1980 in Vangaži), a football coach and former player who played nearly 300 games and 24 for Latvia
- Daniels Ontužāns (born 2000 in Vangaži), footballer who has played over 50 games and 7 for Latvia
