= Skulme =

Skulme is a surname. Notable people with the surname include:

- Džemma Skulme (1925–2019), Latvian painter
- Marta Skulme (1890–1962), Latvian sculptor
- Uga Skulme (1895–1963), Latvian painter
