= Latvijas Gāze =

Company based in Riga, Latvia

A/S Latvijas Gāze
- Type: Public
- Traded as: Nasdaq Baltic: GZE1R
- Industry: Natural Gas
- Founded: 1991
- Headquarters: Riga, Latvia
- Key people: Aigars Kalvītis (Chairman of the board and CEO); Kirill Seleznev (Chairman of the supervisory board)
- Products: Natural Gas
- Services: Natural Gas distribution energy trading
- Revenue: €91.068 million (2024)
- Net income: ▲€13.234 million (2024)
- Total assets: 175,510,000 (2024)
- Number of employees: 115 (2024 average)
- Website: www.lg.lv

A/S Latvijas Gāze is a Latvian natural gas company, which deals in the importation and sale of natural gas.

As of July 2025, Latvijas Gāze was owned by Energy Investments SIA (41,11%), AS Rietumu Banka (28.97%), SIA Itera Latvija (16%) UAB Haupas (6.15%), Port Investment Company SARL (5%) and Pārējie Akcionāri (2.77%). The company was delisted from the Nasdaq Riga in August 2024.

The Latvia's gas transmission network was unbundled from the company in 2016 by establishing an independent transmission and storage company Conexus Baltic Grid. For operating the distribution network, Latvijas Gāze established the gas distribution system operator Gaso.

== History ==
In 1862, an artificial gas factory started operating in Riga, which produced fuel gas from coal for lighting the streets of Old Riga. Later, fuel gas was also used in gas stations and households. The second gas factory in Riga was opened in 1875. The Liepaja gas factory was opened in 1882. After the Second World War, in 1949, liquefied petroleum gas began to be used in Latvia, in 1961, the Main Gasification Board of the Council of Ministers of the LPSR was established, which was later reorganized into the State Gasification Committee of the LPSR. In 1962, a gas pipeline from Dashava in Ukraine reached Riga, and natural gas was used for the first time. In 1968, the Inčukalnas underground gas storage began to operate. In the 1970s, the Giprospecgaz institute in Leningrad prepared a perspective plan for gas supply in Latvia, which provided for the construction of new gas pipelines and compressor stations. In 1972, the Valdais-Pleskava-Riga gas pipeline was opened, which received gas from the Vuktila deposit in Western Siberia. In 1986, the construction of the main gas pipeline Saurieshi-Ogre-Jēkabpils-Daugavpils was completed. The construction of Dobele underground gas storage was also planned, but it was not realized. In 1987, the State Gasification Committee of the LPSR was reorganized into the production association Latvijas Gāze.

In 1991, after the restoration of Latvia's independence, the government took over the entire gas supply infrastructure on the territory of Latvia under its jurisdiction, merging them into the state company Latvijas Gāze (LG), which was registered on 25 March 1991, but on 31 January 1994 it was transformed into a state share society and in 1996 was included in the list of objects to be privatized. From 1997 to 2002, the privatization of Latvijas Gāze took place, and E.ON Ruhrgas International AG, AAS Gazprom and SIA ITERA Latvija became the shareholders of the company. In March 2014, E.ON Ruhrgas announced that it plans to leave the Latvian market. In 2016, E.ON Ruhrgas International GmbH was renamed Uniper Ruhrgas International GmbH, which on January 28 sold 28.97% of shares of Latvijas Gāze to the investment fund Marguerite Fund, in which the financial institutions Caisse des Depots et Consignations, Cassa Depositi e Prestiti, European Investment participate bank, Instituto de Credito Oficial, KfW and PKO Bank Polski.

On 11 February 2016 the Saeima adopted amendments to the Energy Law, stipulating the right of users to choose a gas supplier, thereby implementing the final stage of the natural gas market reform, and by 3 April 2017 it was instructed to separate gas transmission and storage from distribution and trade. On 2 September 2016 the shareholders of Latvijas Gāze approved the reorganization of the company at an extraordinary meeting, on December 22 they established a new commercial company Conexus Baltic Grid and transferred the transmission and storage system assets to it. On 22 November 2017 Latvijas Gāze founded a subsidiary company Gaso, to which the functions of the distribution system operator were transferred.

In January 2016 the Marguerite Fund acquired a 28.97% stake from E.ON. The Fund sold the share to the special purpose entity Energy Investments SIA, which was backed by board members of Latvijas Gāze, in 2023. In 2024, Gazprom sold its entire 27.85% stake to Energy Investments and Haupas. Energy Investments also bought Unipers 18.26% stake in 2025, increasing their share to 41.11%.

== Management ==
The governing bodies of Latvijas Gāze are the shareholders' meeting, the council and the board, of which the shareholders' meeting is the highest. The council is the supervisory body of the company, which represents the interests of the shareholders and supervises the activities of the board between meetings of the shareholders. The council consists of 11 members who are elected for three years. In April 2014, the chairman of the council was Kirils Selezņovs, his deputies were Juris Savickis and Ahims Zauls.

The board manages and manages all affairs of the company, represents the company and manages the company's property in accordance with the Laws. The board decides all issues related to the company's activity, which are not within the competence of the council or the shareholders' meeting. The composition of the Company's Board consists of 5 members, who are elected by the council for three years. In April 2014, the chairman of the board was Adrians Dāvis, his deputies Mario Nulmeiers and Aleksandrs Mihejevs. In August 2015, Aigars Kalvītis, the former Prime Minister and President of Latvia, was appointed as the chairman of the board.

In 2022, one person worked on the board of JSC "Gaso", a subsidiary of JSC "Latvijas Gāze", while five Russian citizens worked on the board. On 16 June 2022 the Saeima adopted amendments to the National Security Law, which prohibited legal entities and citizens of Russia and Belarus from participating significantly in capital companies important to Latvia's security.

== Support programs ==
In 1997, Latvijas Gāze became a supporter of the Latvian Olympic Committee and the general sponsor of the Latvian National Men's Basketball Team. In 2003, it started funding an annual award for lifetime achievement in science, promising applications in the fields of gas, heating technology, related chemistry, and cardiology. In 2004, Latvijas Gāze was named a patron of the Latvian National Opera and also participated in organizing the International Opera Music Festival and supporting various international music festivals and competitions.
