= Herberts Dāboliņš =

Latvian cross-country skier (1908–2000)

Personal information
- Full name: Kārlis Herberts Dāboliņš
- Nationality: Latvian
- Born: 21 August 1908; Allažu, Siguldas novads, Latvia
- Died: 8 November 2000 (aged 92); New York, New York, U.S.

Sport
- Sport: Cross-country skiing

Kārlis Herberts Dāboliņš (21 August 1908 – 8 November 2000) was a Latvian cross-country skier.

He was born in 1908 in the Allazi parish. He was an instructor in the Latvian Army's 6th infantry regiment.

He competed in the 1936 Winter Olympics in Garmisch-Partenirchen in the men's 18 km ski race and the 4x10 km cross-country ski relay as part of the Latvian team .

He became a refugee during World War II. He moved to the US and lived in the Bronx, New York until his death in 2000.
