= Mālpils =

Village in Latvia

- Village
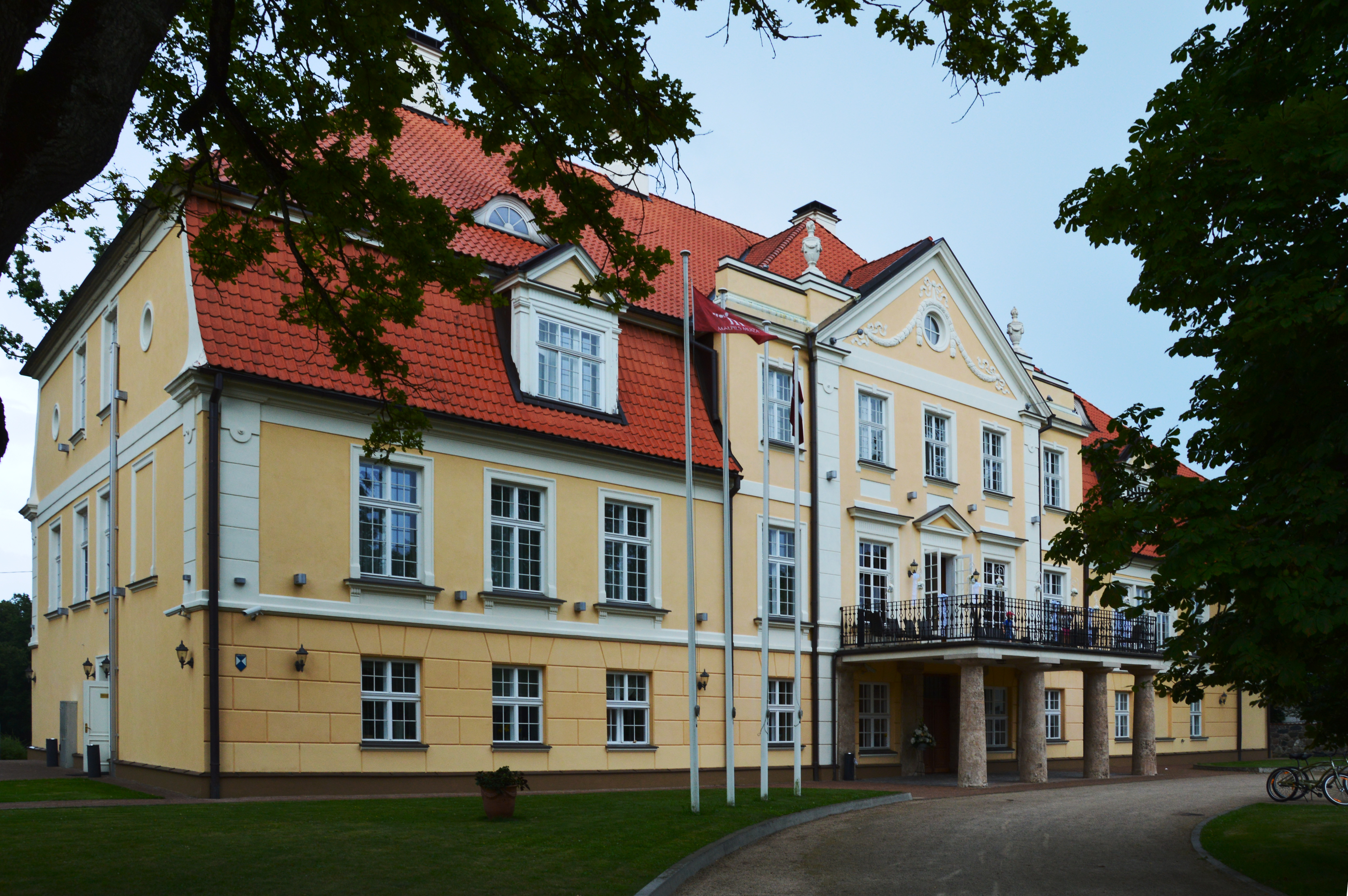
- Mālpils manor

- Mālpils's location in Latvia
- Coordinates: 57°0′38″N 24°57′35″E
- Country: Latvia
- Municipality: Sigulda
- Parish: Mālpils

Area
  - Total: 1.554 sq mi (4.025 km^{2})

Population (2020)
  - Total: 1,838

Mālpils (German: Lemburg) is a village in the Mālpils Parish of Sigulda Municipality, in the Vidzeme region of Latvia. Mālpils had 1,838 residents as of 2020.

== History ==
Between 1386 and 1413 the fortress Lemburg of the Teutonic Order was created. From the 15th century on there was a church. In 1577 the castle was occupied by troops of the Danish prince Magnus.

The village was built around the Good Lemburg, which was established after the Swedish conquest in 1622. Already before 1613, a Lutheran pastor is attested. In 1693 there was a community school.

The governor of Livonia Gustav von Taube became owner in 1760 and built larger parks. In 1766 a stone church was built. In 1845, many of the local peasants changed denominations and established a Russian Orthodox community. After the mansion had been burnt down during the Russian Revolution in 1905, a reconstruction in the classicist style began after the plans of Wilhelm Bockslaff. In 1920, the property was expropriated and divided into 166 farms for new settlers. The mansion served as a school and recreation home for soldiers.

After the Second World War, there was a school for construction engineering and later the administration of a sovkhoz. During this time, the population, which in 1935 had still consisted of 279 inhabitants, grew to over 2500.

The restored estate buildings were opened in 2008 for the 150th anniversary of the architect Bockslaff and now serve as an exclusive hotel.

== Etymology ==
The place appears as Lehmborch (1466), Leemborch (1498), Lemborch (1530) and Latvian Mahlpils (1909) in documents.

The resident Liven called the place lembit-urga, which means something like "chief river". In terms of folklore, the German crusaders made it "Lehmburg". The Latvian name in turn is a translation: "clay castle" - Latvian Māls-Pils.

There are also stories that the Latvian peasants used to call the castle Mārpils because a girl named Māra was walled into the castle by Crusaders.

== Mālpils Novads (2009-2021) ==
The municipality of Mālpils was designated as Mālpils novads in 2009 as part of an administrative reform without territorial change. In addition to the main town are the villages Sidgunda (459 inhabitants), Upmalas (157 inhabitants), Vite (52 inhabitants) and Bukas (39 inhabitants) in the district. The remaining 4039 inhabitants (as of 2009) live on individual farms or in smaller settlements.

The rivers Mergupe and Suda flow through the district, ending in the big Jugla. On the 220.9 km^{2} large territory there are several wetlands with more than 1000 hectares.

== Gallery ==
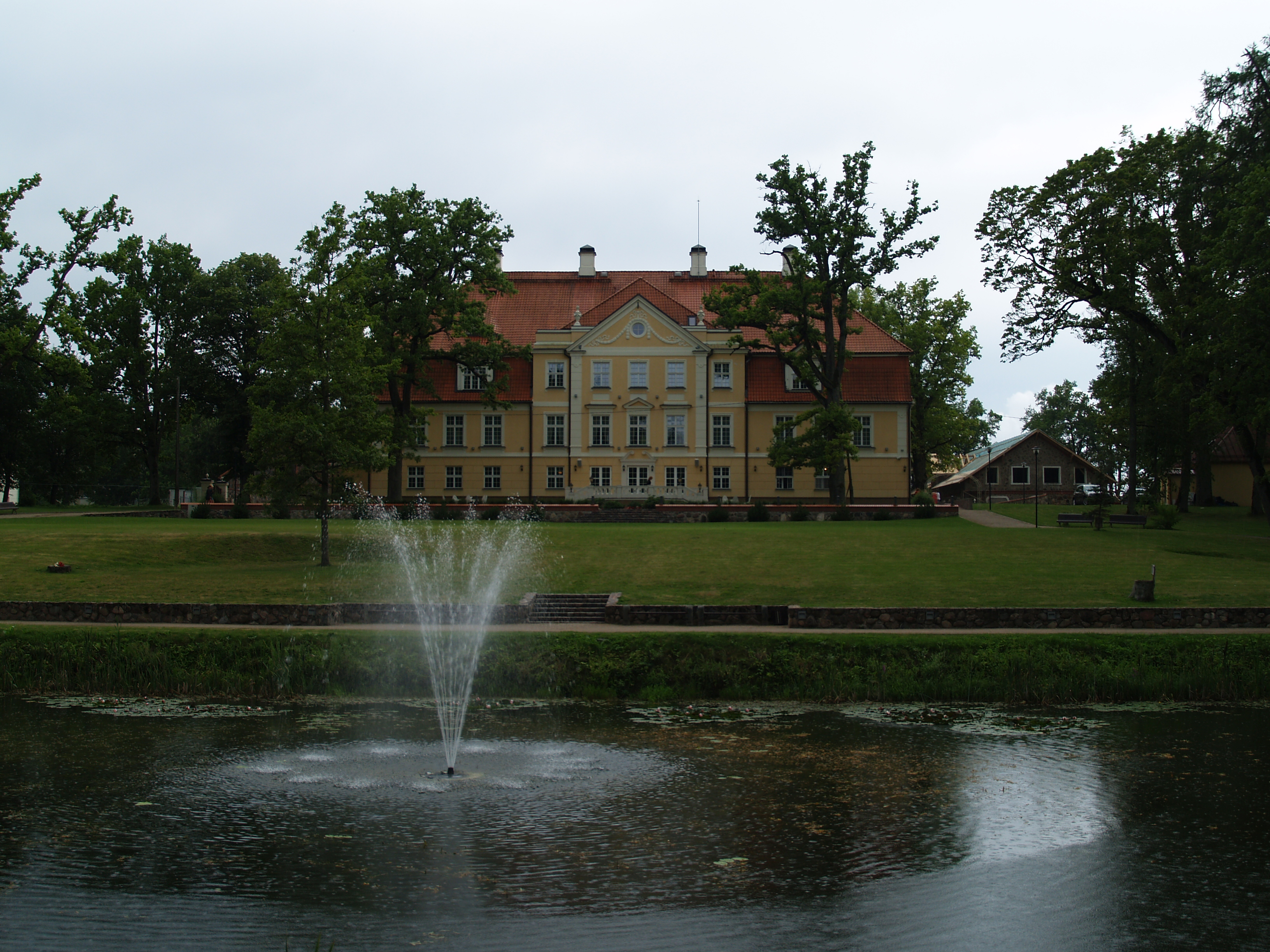
Mālpils manor back

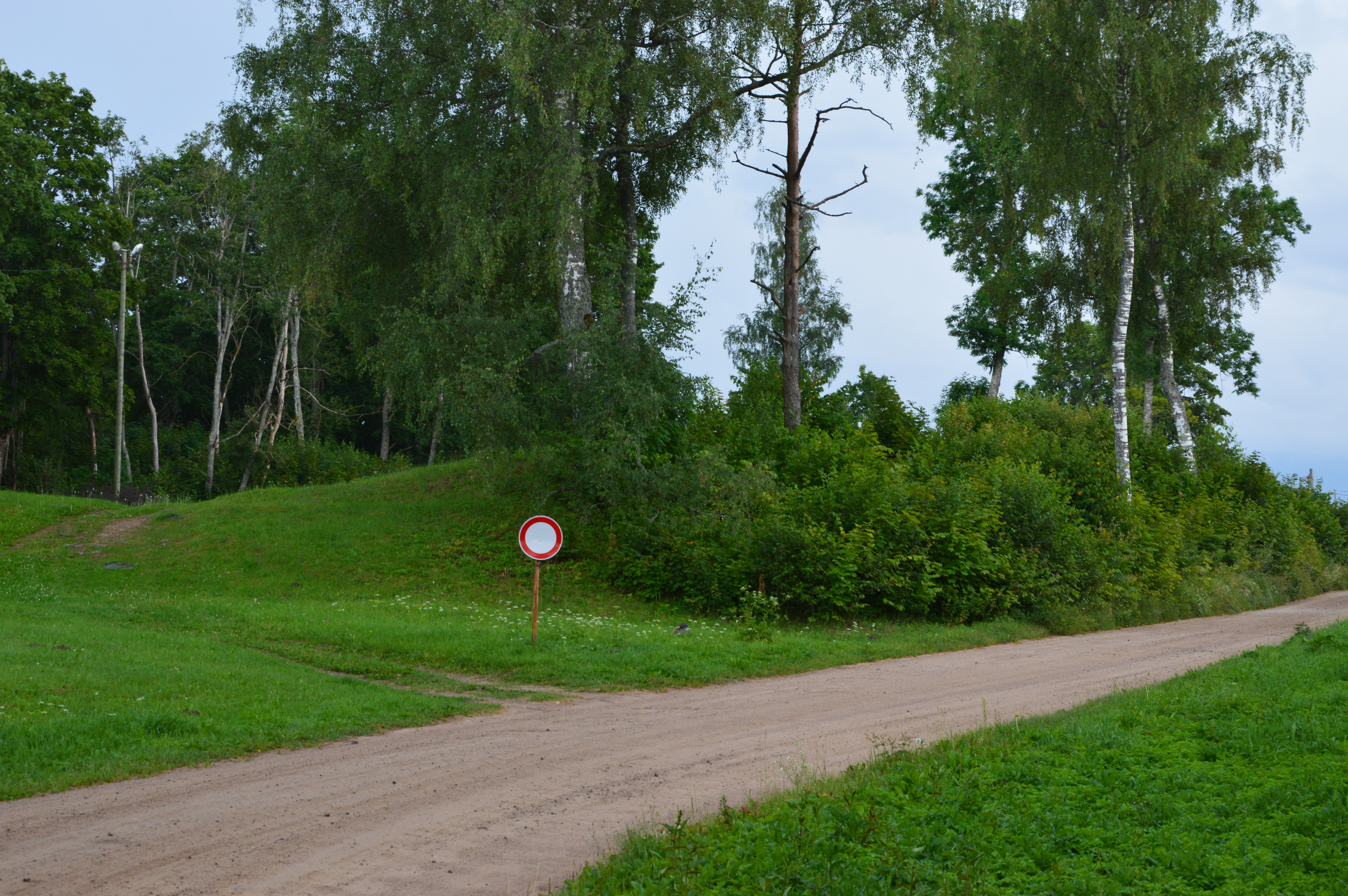
Location of former Mālpils castle

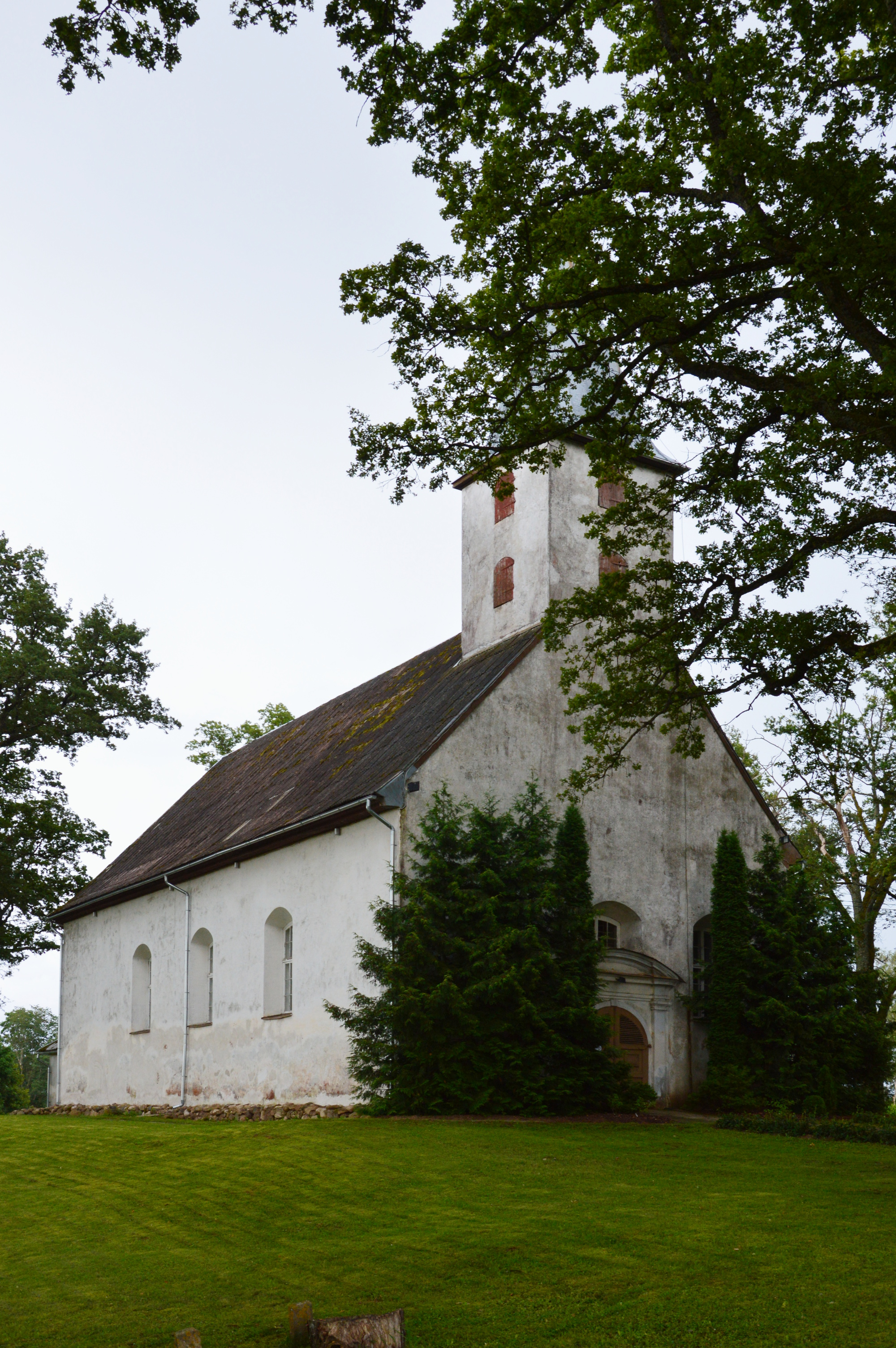
Lutheran church in Mālpils

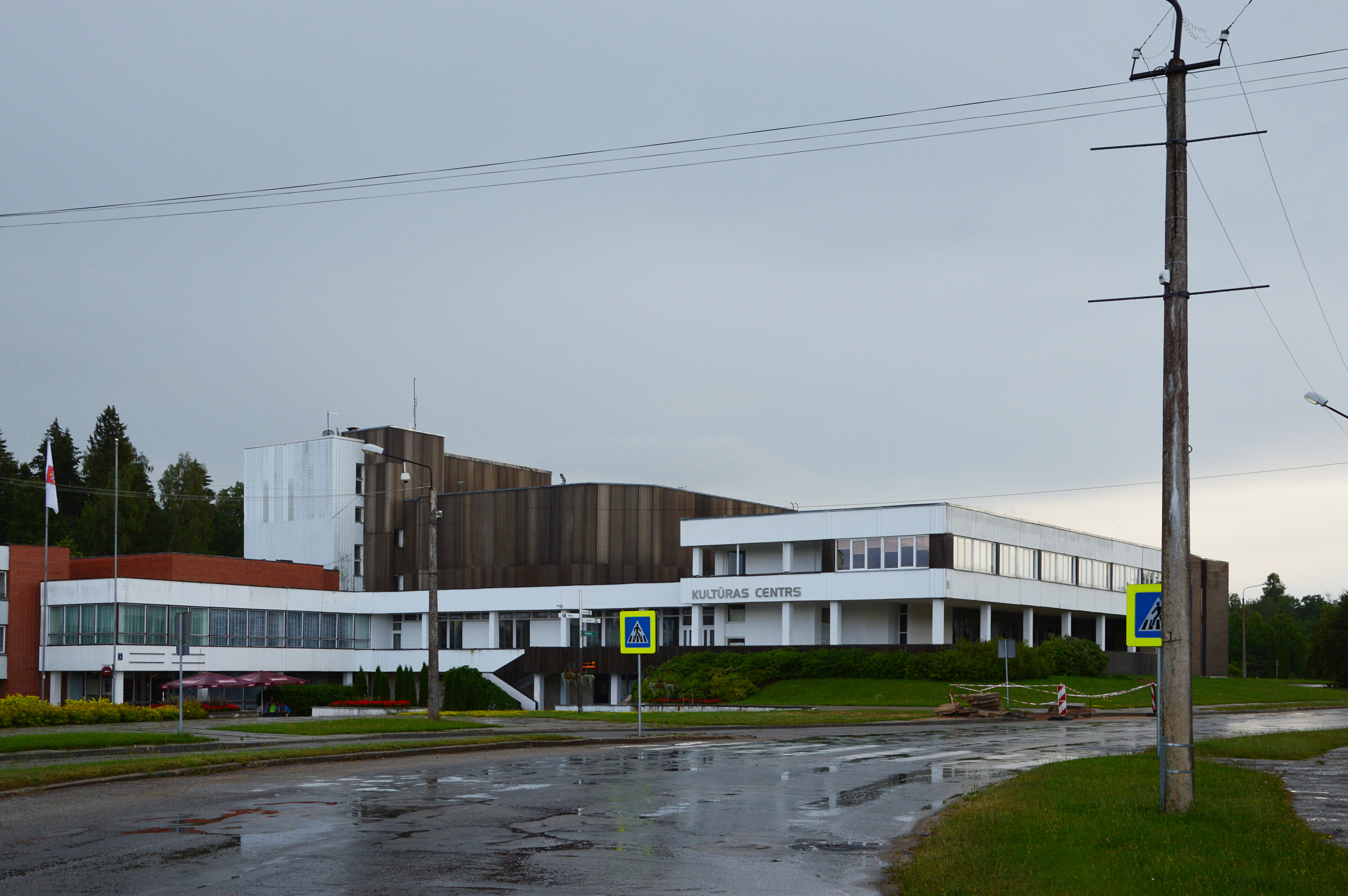
Cultural house

== Notable people ==
- Johann Gottlieb von Wolff
- the alternative rock band aPēdājs.
