= Daon =

Daon or DAON could refer to:

- Daon, Mayenne, France, a commune
- Daon, Inc., an Irish biometrics company
- Zenata – Messali El Hadj Airport, an airport near Tlemcen, Algeria, by ICAO code

== See also ==
- Daone, a commune in Italy
