= Leonids Esterkins =

Latvian entrepreneur (born 1954)

- Леонид Эстеркин
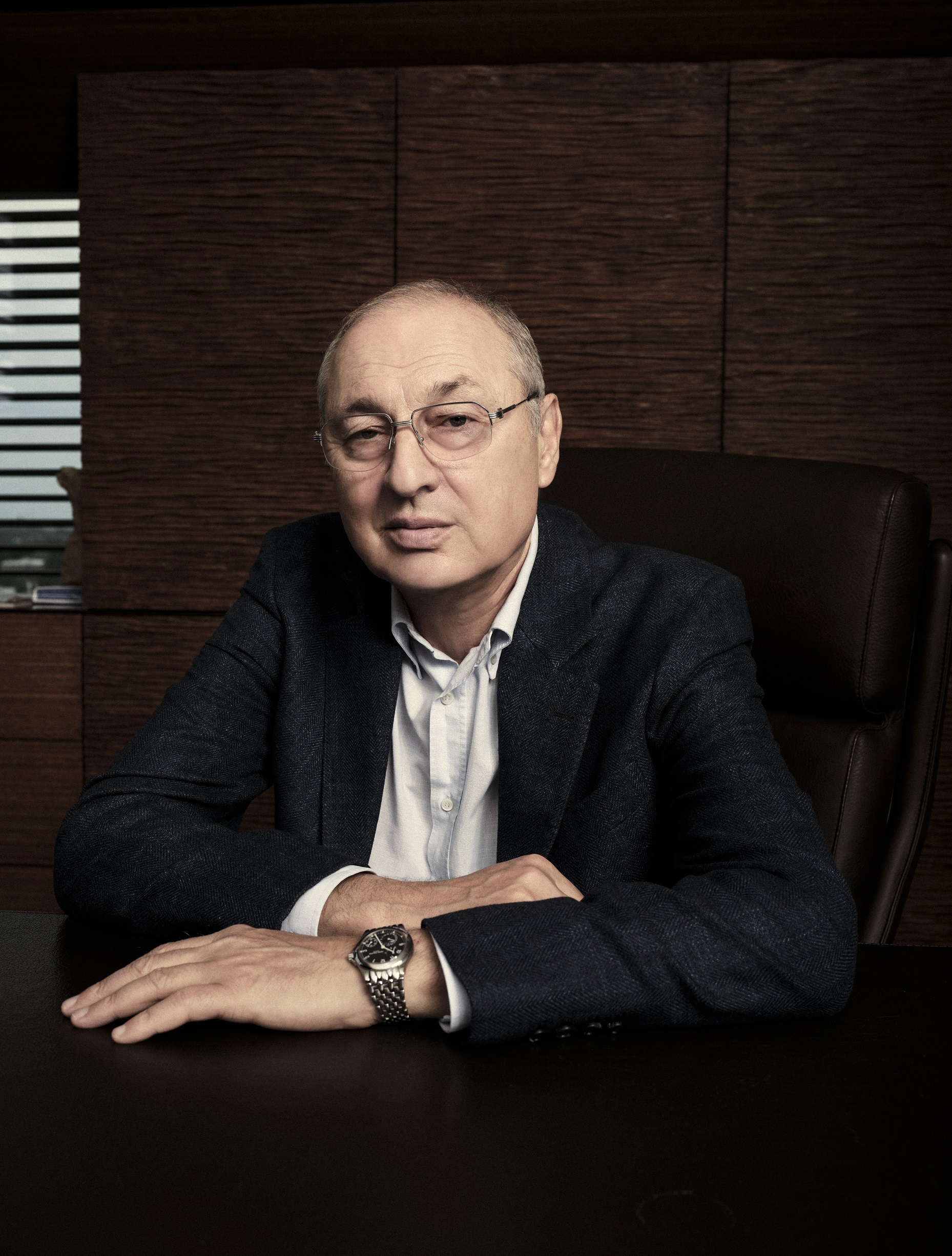
- Born: Леонид Эстеркин; November 7, 1954 (age 71); Mykolaiv, Ukraine
- Citizenship: Latvia
- Education: Riga Technical University
- Occupations: Latvian entrepreneur, founder, and main shareholder of Rietumu Banka

Leonids Esterkins (Russian: Леонид Эстеркин; born on November 7, 1954, in Mykolaiv, Ukraine) is a Latvian entrepreneur, founder, and main shareholder of Rietumu Banka — Latvia's largest local capital bank, also one of the four leading banks in the country. He is a Latvian citizen.

In 2022, the economic and business magazine "Dienas Bizness" named Leonids Esterkins the wealthiest person in Latvia in its annual "Millionaires" ranking.

== Education ==
In 1972, he completed high school in Mykolaiv, and in 1978, he obtained an engineering degree from the Faculty of Automation and Computer Science at Riga Technical University (formerly Riga Polytechnical Institute).

== Career ==
Since the early 1980s, he has been involved in private entrepreneurship.

In 1992, together with partners, he founded Rietumu Banka, where he currently holds the largest share (33.12%) through the Latvian company "Esterkin Family Investments."

He is the Chairman of the Council of Rietumu Banka and provides overall vision for the bank, steers the implementation of the strategic development of the bank, and generally supervises lending and investments, corporate finance and corporate treasury, and marketing and public relations.

In addition to his work at the bank, he invests in real estate development projects, the hotel business, shopping centers, solar energy parks, and mining ventures in various countries worldwide.

=== Perspective ===
He is an active supporter of Latvia's economic strategic development and enhancing global competitiveness. In a 2022 interview with the Spanish publication "El Mundo," he emphasized the need for Latvia to act swiftly in its development to succeed in competition. He stated, "We cannot sit with folded hands, repeating that our country is small or that we do not have a strong economy. Some may think that we cannot implement large projects, but despite that, we have always succeeded. We have always had and have strong competitors, and to survive, we had to look for non-standard solutions that lead us to success. So far, it has always worked."

Esterkins also noted in the interview that for several years, there had been a question in Latvia's political agenda about a fundamental reform of the banking sector, which has been successfully implemented, resulting in a transformed and robust financial system in the country.

He supports project financing in the fields of manufacturing, green energy, financial technology, real estate development, and agricultural innovation.

=== Jurmala ===
Leonids Esterkins resides in Jurmala and actively participates in the development of the resort city and the improvement of the urban environment. For several years, he has supported the annual international classical music festival "Riga Jurmala" and participates in the international antique car parade "Retro Jurmala" every year. In 2023, following Leonids Esterkins' initiative and financial support, the creation of a book about the history, architecture, nature, and culture of Jurmala, titled "Jurmala. Pearl of the Baltic / Wellness. Nature. Culture" was initiated.

== Interests ==
Leonids Esterkins collects paintings, sculptures, decorative, and applied art objects. He owns the largest collection of glass art objects from the Art Deco period, manufactured by the French workshop Daum.

He led the formation of Rietumu Banka's art collection, including hundreds of artworks, approximately 250 of which are classical Latvian paintings by artists such as Ludolfs Liberts, Jānis Ferdinands Tīdemanis, Jānis Pauļuks, Džemma Skulme, Konrāds Ubāns, Aleksandra Beļcova, Eduards Kalniņš, Leo Svemps, Rūdolfs Pinnis, Valdis Kalnroze, Imants Vecozols, and others. In the spring of 2023, an exhibition of works from the bank's collection, titled "Reflections of the Era," took place at the Art Museum "Rīgas Birža."

He has an interest in architecture and design. He participated in the interior design of Rietumu Capital Centre, the A+++ class office building of Rietumu Banka, which was recognized as the best architectural project in Riga in 2010. In 2023, the World Wildlife Fund (WWF) awarded the building a Green Office certificate.

He is proficient in Ukrainian, English, Russian, and Latvian.

== Private life ==
Leonids Esterkins is married, and has a son and a grandson.
