= 2018–19 EFL League One =

EFL League One
- Season: 2018–19
- Dates: 4 August 2018 – 4 May 2019
- Champions: Luton Town (2nd divisional title)
- Promoted: Luton Town; Barnsley; Charlton Athletic
- Relegated: Plymouth Argyle; Walsall; Scunthorpe United; Bradford City
- Matches: 552
- Goals: 1,462 (2.65 per match)
- Top goalscorer: James Collins (25 goals)
- Biggest home win: Doncaster Rovers 5–0 Rochdale (1 January 2019)
- Biggest away win: Scunthorpe United 0–5 Fleetwood Town (22 August 2018)
- Highest scoring: Sunderland 4–5 Coventry City (13 April 2019)
- Longest winning run: 7 matches Luton; Portsmouth
- Longest unbeaten run: 28 matches Luton
- Longest winless run: 15 matches Southend United
- Longest losing run: 8 matches AFC Wimbledon
- Highest attendance: 46,039; Sunderland 1–0 Bradford City (26 December 2018)
- Lowest attendance: 1,732; Accrington Stanley 2–1 AFC Wimbledon (22 September 2018)
- Total attendance: 4,812,867
- Average attendance: 8,184

The 2018–19 EFL League One (referred to as the Sky Bet League One for sponsorship reasons) was the 15th season of the Football League One under its current title and the 26th season under its current league division format. Fixtures were released on 21 June 2018 and the opening round of matches was played on 4 August 2018. The league season ended on 4 May 2019.

The summer transfer window closed five days after the start of the season, on 9 August 2018, following a vote by all 72 clubs in the Football League. However, clubs were able to make loan signings until 31 August.

== Team changes ==
The following teams have changed division since the 2017–18 season:

=== To League One ===
Promoted from League Two

- Accrington Stanley
- Luton Town
- Wycombe Wanderers
- Coventry City

Relegated from Championship

- Sunderland
- Burton Albion
- Barnsley

=== From League One ===
Promoted to Championship

- Wigan Athletic
- Blackburn Rovers
- Rotherham United

Relegated to League Two

- Bury
- Milton Keynes Dons
- Northampton Town
- Oldham Athletic

== Teams ==
Locations of the 2018–19 Football League One teams
Location of Northern teams in 2018–19 EFL League One

Team	Location	Stadium	Capacity
Accrington Stanley	Accrington	Crown Ground	5,057
AFC Wimbledon	London (Kingston upon Thames)	Kingsmeadow	4,850
Barnsley	Barnsley	Oakwell	23,009
Blackpool	Blackpool	Bloomfield Road	17,338
Bradford City	Bradford	Valley Parade	25,136
Bristol Rovers	Bristol	Memorial Stadium	12,300
Burton Albion	Burton upon Trent	Pirelli Stadium	6,912
Charlton Athletic	London (Charlton)	The Valley	27,111
Coventry City	Coventry	Ricoh Arena	32,609
Doncaster Rovers	Doncaster	Keepmoat Stadium	15,231
Fleetwood Town	Fleetwood	Highbury Stadium	5,311
Gillingham	Gillingham	Priestfield Stadium	11,582
Luton Town	Luton	Kenilworth Road	10,336
Oxford United	Oxford	Kassam Stadium	12,500
Peterborough United	Peterborough	ABAX Stadium	15,314
Plymouth Argyle	Plymouth	Home Park	12,500*
Portsmouth	Portsmouth	Fratton Park	21,100
Rochdale	Rochdale	Spotland Stadium	10,500
Scunthorpe United	Scunthorpe	Glanford Park	9,088
Shrewsbury Town	Shrewsbury	New Meadow	9,875
Southend United	Southend-on-Sea	Roots Hall	12,392
Sunderland	Sunderland	Stadium of Light	48,707
Walsall	Walsall	Bescot Stadium	11,300
Wycombe Wanderers	High Wycombe	Adams Park	10,137

*reduced for that season as club work on ground

== Personnel and sponsoring ==
Team	Manager^{1}	Captain	Kit manufacturer	Sponsor
Accrington Stanley	(England) John Coleman	(Republic of Ireland) Seamus Conneely	Adidas	Wham
AFC Wimbledon	(England) Wally Downes	(Nigeria) Deji Oshilaja	Puma	Sports Interactive
Barnsley	(Germany) Daniel Stendel	(Wales) Adam Davies	Puma	C.K. Beckett
Blackpool	(England) Terry McPhillips	(England) Andy Taylor	Erreà	BetSid
Bradford City	(England) Gary Bowyer	(England) Josh Wright	Avec Sport	JCT600
Bristol Rovers	(Republic of Ireland) Graham Coughlan	(Wales) Tom Lockyer	Macron	Football INDEX
Burton Albion	(England) Nigel Clough	(England) Jake Buxton	TAG	Prestec UK Ltd
Charlton Athletic	(England) Lee Bowyer	(England) Chris Solly	Hummel	BETDAQ
Coventry City	(England) Mark Robins	(Republic of Ireland) Michael Doyle	Nike	Midrepro
Doncaster Rovers	(Northern Ireland) Grant McCann	(England) James Coppinger	FBT	LNER
Fleetwood Town	(England) Joey Barton	(England) Nathan Pond	Hummel	BES Utilities
Gillingham	(England) Mark Patterson	(Democratic Republic of the Congo) Gabriel Zakuani	GFC Leisure	Medway Council
Luton Town	(England) Mick Harford	(Republic of Ireland) Alan Sheehan	Puma	Indigo Residential (Home), Star Platforms (Away), Northern Gas & Power (3rd)
Oxford United	(England) Karl Robinson	(England) Curtis Nelson	Puma	Singha Beer
Peterborough United	(Scotland) Darren Ferguson	(England) Alex Woodyard	Nike	Mick George
Plymouth Argyle	(England) Kevin Nancekivell	(England) Gary Sawyer	Puma	Ginsters
Portsmouth	(Wales) Kenny Jackett	(England) Brett Pitman	Nike	University of Portsmouth
Rochdale	(Republic of Ireland) Brian Barry-Murphy	(Northern Ireland) Callum Camps	Erreà	Crown Oil Ltd
Scunthorpe United	(England) Andy Dawson	(Northern Ireland) Rory McArdle	FBT	British Steel
Shrewsbury Town	(Wales) Sam Ricketts	(England) Mat Sadler	Erreà	The Energy Check (Home), Shropshire Homes (Away & 3rd)
Southend United	(England) Kevin Bond	(England) Mark Oxley	Nike	Prostate Cancer UK
Sunderland	(Scotland) Jack Ross	(England) George Honeyman	Adidas	BETDAQ
Walsall	(Cayman Islands) Martin O'Connor	(England) Adam Chambers	Erreà	HomeServe
Wycombe Wanderers	(England) Gareth Ainsworth	(Egypt) Adam El-Abd	O'Neills	Cherry Red Records (Home), Utilita (Away)

- ^{1} According to current revision of List of current Premier League and English Football League managers.

== Managerial changes ==
Team	Outgoing manager	Manner of departure	Date of vacancy	Position in table	Incoming manager	Date of appointment
Barnsley	(Portugal) José Morais	Sacked	6 May 2018	Pre-season	(Germany) Daniel Stendel	6 June 2018
Bradford City	(England) Simon Grayson	End of contract	8 May 2018	Pre-season	(Republic of Ireland) Michael Collins	18 June 2018
Fleetwood Town	(Republic of Ireland) John Sheridan	End of contract	2 June 2018	Pre-season	(England) Joey Barton	2 June 2018
Sunderland	(Scotland) Robbie Stockdale	End of caretaker spell	25 May 2018	Pre-season	(Scotland) Jack Ross	25 May 2018
Shrewsbury Town	(England) Paul Hurst	Signed by Ipswich Town	30 May 2018	Pre-season	(England) John Askey	1 June 2018
Doncaster Rovers	(Scotland) Darren Ferguson	Resigned	4 June 2018	Pre-season	(Northern Ireland) Grant McCann	27 June 2018
Blackpool	(England) Gary Bowyer	Resigned	6 August 2018	12th	(England) Terry McPhillips	6 August 2018
Scunthorpe United	(England) Nick Daws	Sacked	24 August 2018	18th	(Scotland) Stuart McCall	27 August 2018
Bradford City	(Republic of Ireland) Michael Collins	Sacked	3 September 2018	17th	(Scotland) David Hopkin	4 September 2018
AFC Wimbledon	(England) Neal Ardley	Mutual consent	12 November 2018	23rd	(England) Wally Downes	4 December 2018
Shrewsbury Town	(England) John Askey	Sacked	12 November 2018	18th	(Wales) Sam Ricketts	3 December 2018
Bristol Rovers	(England) Darrell Clarke	Mutual consent	13 December 2018	21st	(Republic of Ireland) Graham Coughlan	6 January 2019
Luton Town	(Wales) Nathan Jones	Signed by Stoke City	9 January 2019	2nd	(England) Mick Harford	10 January 2019
Peterborough United	(Scotland) Steve Evans	Sacked	26 January 2019	6th	(Scotland) Darren Ferguson	26 January 2019
Bradford City	(Scotland) David Hopkin	Resigned	25 February 2019	23rd	(England) Gary Bowyer	4 March 2019
Rochdale	(England) Keith Hill	Sacked	4 March 2019	22nd	(Republic of Ireland) Brian Barry-Murphy	4 March 2019
Scunthorpe United	(Scotland) Stuart McCall	Sacked	24 March 2019	18th	(England) Andy Dawson	24 March 2019
Southend United	(England) Chris Powell	Sacked	26 March 2019	20th	(England) Kevin Bond	2 April 2019
Walsall	(England) Dean Keates	Sacked	6 April 2019	22nd	(Cayman Islands) Martin O'Connor	8 April 2019
Gillingham	(Wales) Steve Lovell	Sacked	26 April 2019	13th	(England) Mark Patterson	26 April 2019
Plymouth Argyle	(Scotland) Derek Adams	Sacked	28 April 2019	21st	(England) Ryan Lowe	5 June 2019

== League table ==
Pos	Team	Pld	W	D	L	GF	GA	GD	Pts	Promotion, qualification or relegation
1	Luton Town (C, P)	46	27	13	6	90	42	+48	94	Promotion to the EFL Championship
2	Barnsley (P)	46	26	13	7	80	39	+41	91	Promotion to the EFL Championship
3	Charlton Athletic (O, P)	46	26	10	10	73	40	+33	88	Qualification for League One play-offs (Note: Four teams play for one spot and promotion to the EFL Championship.)
4	Portsmouth	46	25	13	8	83	51	+32	88	Qualification for League One play-offs
5	Sunderland	46	22	19	5	80	47	+33	85	Qualification for League One play-offs
6	Doncaster Rovers	46	20	13	13	76	58	+18	73	Qualification for League One play-offs
7	Peterborough United	46	20	12	14	71	62	+9	72	
8	Coventry City	46	18	11	17	54	54	0	65	
9	Burton Albion	46	17	12	17	66	57	+9	63	
10	Blackpool	46	15	17	14	50	52	−2	62	
11	Fleetwood Town	46	16	13	17	58	52	+6	61	
12	Oxford United	46	15	15	16	58	64	−6	60	
13	Gillingham	46	15	10	21	61	72	−11	55	
14	Accrington Stanley	46	14	13	19	51	67	−16	55	
15	Bristol Rovers	46	13	15	18	47	50	−3	54	
16	Rochdale	46	15	9	22	54	87	−33	54	
17	Wycombe Wanderers	46	14	11	21	55	67	−12	53	
18	Shrewsbury Town	46	12	16	18	51	59	−8	52	
19	Southend United	46	14	8	24	55	68	−13	50	
20	AFC Wimbledon	46	13	11	22	42	63	−21	50	
21	Plymouth Argyle (R)	46	13	11	22	56	80	−24	50	Relegation to EFL League Two
22	Walsall (R)	46	12	11	23	49	71	−22	47	Relegation to EFL League Two
23	Scunthorpe United (R)	46	12	10	24	53	83	−30	46	Relegation to EFL League Two
24	Bradford City (R)	46	11	8	27	49	77	−28	41	Relegation to EFL League Two

Source: EFL Official Website
Rules for classification: 1) Points; 2) Goal difference; 3) Number of goals scored; 4) Head-to-head results
(C) Champions; (O) Play-off winners; (P) Promoted; (R) Relegated

== Play-offs ==
Semi-finals
3	Charlton Athletic (p)	2	2	4 (4)
6	Doncaster Rovers	1	3	4 (3)
4	Portsmouth	0	0	0
5	Sunderland	1	0	1

Final
3	Charlton Athletic	2
5	Sunderland	1

== Results ==
Home \ Away	ACC	WIM	BAR	BLP	BRA	BRR	BRT	CHA	COV	DON	FLE	GIL	LUT	OXF	PET	PLY	POR	ROC	SCU	SHR	STD	SUN	WAL	WYC
Accrington Stanley	—	2–1	0–2	1–2	3–1	0–0	1–1	1–1	0–1	1–0	0–1	0–2	0–3	4–2	0–4	5–1	1–1	0–1	1–1	2–1	1–1	0–3	2–1	1–2
AFC Wimbledon	1–1	—	1–4	0–0	0–1	1–1	0–2	1–2	0–0	2–0	0–3	2–4	0–2	2–1	1–0	2–1	1–2	1–1	2–3	1–2	2–1	1–2	1–3	2–1
Barnsley	2–0	0–0	—	2–1	3–0	1–0	0–0	2–1	2–2	1–1	4–2	2–1	3–2	4–0	2–0	1–1	1–1	2–1	2–0	2–1	1–0	0–0	1–1	2–1
Blackpool	1–1	2–0	0–1	—	3–2	0–3	3–0	2–1	2–0	1–1	2–1	0–3	0–0	0–1	0–1	2–2	1–2	2–2	1–0	0–0	2–2	0–1	2–0	2–2
Bradford City	3–0	0–0	0–2	1–4	—	0–0	1–0	0–2	2–4	0–1	0–1	1–1	0–1	2–0	3–1	0–0	0–1	0–2	2–0	4–3	0–4	1–2	4–0	1–2
Bristol Rovers	1–2	2–0	2–1	4–0	3–2	—	0–0	0–0	3–1	0–4	2–1	1–2	1–2	0–0	2–2	0–0	1–2	0–1	1–2	1–1	0–1	0–2	0–1	0–1
Burton Albion	5–2	3–0	3–1	3–0	1–1	1–0	—	1–2	1–0	1–0	0–1	2–3	2–1	0–0	1–2	1–1	1–2	1–2	0–0	2–1	1–2	2–1	0–0	3–1
Charlton Athletic	1–0	2–0	2–0	0–0	1–0	3–1	2–1	—	1–2	2–0	0–0	2–0	3–1	1–1	0–1	2–1	2–1	4–0	4–0	2–1	1–1	1–1	2–1	3–2
Coventry City	1–1	1–1	1–0	0–2	2–0	0–0	1–2	2–1	—	2–1	2–1	1–1	1–2	0–1	1–1	1–0	0–1	0–1	1–2	1–1	1–0	1–1	3–0	1–0
Doncaster Rovers	1–2	2–1	0–0	2–0	2–1	4–1	2–2	1–1	2–0	—	0–4	3–3	2–1	2–2	3–1	2–0	0–0	5–0	3–0	0–0	3–0	0–1	3–1	3–0
Fleetwood Town	1–1	0–1	1–3	3–2	2–1	0–0	1–0	1–0	3–0	3–0	—	1–1	1–2	2–2	1–1	2–0	2–5	2–2	0–1	2–1	2–2	2–1	0–0	1–1
Gillingham	0–0	0–1	1–4	0–1	4–0	0–1	3–1	0–2	1–1	1–3	3–0	—	1–3	1–0	2–4	3–1	2–0	1–1	1–0	0–2	0–2	1–4	0–3	2–2
Luton Town	4–1	2–2	0–0	2–2	4–0	1–0	2–0	2–2	1–1	4–0	2–0	2–2	—	3–1	4–0	5–1	3–2	2–0	3–2	3–2	2–0	1–1	2–0	3–0
Oxford United	2–3	0–0	2–2	2–0	1–0	0–2	3–1	2–1	1–2	2–2	0–2	1–0	1–2	—	0–1	2–0	2–1	4–2	2–1	3–0	0–1	1–1	1–2	2–1
Peterborough United	0–1	1–0	0–4	2–2	1–1	2–1	3–1	0–0	1–2	1–1	1–0	2–0	3–1	2–2	—	0–1	1–2	2–1	0–2	1–2	2–0	1–1	1–1	4–2
Plymouth Argyle	0–3	1–0	0–3	0–1	3–3	2–2	2–3	0–2	2–1	2–3	2–1	3–1	0–0	3–0	1–5	—	1–1	5–1	3–2	2–1	1–1	0–2	2–1	1–1
Portsmouth	1–1	2–1	0–0	0–1	5–1	1–1	2–2	1–2	2–1	1–1	1–0	0–2	1–0	4–1	2–3	3–0	—	4–1	2–0	1–1	2–0	3–1	2–0	2–2
Rochdale	1–0	3–4	0–4	2–1	0–4	0–0	0–4	1–0	0–1	2–3	1–1	3–0	0–0	0–0	1–4	1–2	1–3	—	3–1	2–1	1–0	1–2	1–2	1–0
Scunthorpe United	2–0	1–2	2–2	0–0	2–3	0–1	0–3	5–3	2–1	1–1	0–5	0–2	0–2	3–3	0–2	1–4	1–2	3–3	—	1–0	4–1	1–1	1–1	1–0
Shrewsbury Town	1–0	0–0	3–1	0–0	0–1	1–1	1–1	0–3	1–0	2–0	0–0	2–2	0–3	2–3	2–2	2–0	0–2	3–2	1–1	—	2–0	0–2	0–0	2–1
Southend United	3–0	0–1	0–3	1–2	2–0	1–2	3–2	1–2	1–2	2–3	1–0	2–0	0–1	0–0	2–3	2–3	3–3	1–2	2–0	0–2	—	2–1	3–0	0–2
Sunderland	2–2	1–0	4–2	1–1	1–0	2–1	1–1	2–1	4–5	2–0	1–1	4–2	1–1	1–1	2–2	2–0	1–1	4–1	3–0	1–1	3–0	—	2–1	1–1
Walsall	0–1	0–1	0–1	0–0	3–2	1–3	1–3	0–2	2–1	1–4	2–0	2–1	2–2	1–3	3–0	2–1	2–3	1–2	1–2	0–0	1–1	2–2	—	3–2
Wycombe Wanderers	1–3	1–2	1–0	0–0	0–0	1–2	2–1	0–1	0–2	3–2	1–0	0–1	1–1	0–0	1–0	1–0	2–3	3–0	3–2	3–2	2–3	1–1	1–0	—

Updated to match(es) played on 4 May 2019. Source: EFL Official Website
Legend: Blue = home team win; Yellow = draw; Red = away team win.
For upcoming matches, an "a" indicates there is an article about the rivalry between the two participants.

== Top scorers ==
As of 4 May 2019

Rank	Player	Club	Goals
1	(Republic of Ireland) James Collins	Luton Town	25
2	(England) John Marquis	Doncaster Rovers	21
2	(Montserrat) Lyle Taylor	Charlton Athletic	21
2	(England) Tom Eaves	Gillingham	21
5	(England) Ian Henderson	Rochdale	20
6	(England) Freddie Ladapo	Plymouth Argyle	18
7	(Wales) Ched Evans	Fleetwood Town	17
7	(Wales) Kieffer Moore	Barnsley	17
9	(Jamaica) Jonson Clarke-Harris	Coventry City/Bristol Rovers	16
9	(England) Cauley Woodrow	Barnsley	16
9	(Jamaica) Jamal Lowe	Portsmouth	16

== Hat-tricks ==
Player	For	Against	Result	Date	Ref
(Wales) Kieffer Moore	Barnsley	Rochdale	0–4 (A)	21 August 2018	
(England) Ian Henderson	Rochdale	Gillingham	3–0 (H)	15 September 2018	
(England) Danny Hylton	Luton Town	Accrington Stanley	4–1 (H)	23 October 2018	
(Republic of Ireland) James Collins	Luton Town	Plymouth Argyle	5–1 (H)	17 November 2018	
(England) Ivan Toney	Peterborough United	Accrington Stanley	0–4 (A)	29 December 2018	
(Republic of Ireland) Marcus Harness	Burton Albion	Rochdale	0–4 (A)	5 January 2019	
(England) Andy Cook	Walsall	Gillingham	0–3 (A)	19 January 2019	
(Republic of Ireland) James Collins	Luton Town	Peterborough United	4–0 (H)	19 January 2019	
(England) Fejiri Okenabirhie	Shrewsbury Town	Bradford City	4–3 (A)	29 January 2019	
(Republic of Ireland) Simon Cox	Southend United	Portsmouth	3–3 (H)	16 February 2019	
(England) Joe Pigott	AFC Wimbledon	Rochdale	3–4 (A)	19 February 2019	
(Jamaica) Jonson Clarke-Harris	Bristol Rovers	Blackpool	4–0 (H)	2 March 2019	
(Northern Ireland) Gavin Whyte	Oxford United	Shrewsbury Town	2–3 (A)	22 April 2019	
(England) Sean McConville	Accrington Stanley	Plymouth Argyle	5–1 (H)	27 April 2019	

Note

(H) = Home; (A) = Away

== Attendances ==
#	Club	Average attendance	Highest	Lowest
1	Sunderland AFC	32,157	46,039	27,580
2	Portsmouth F.C.	18,223	19,402	16,794
3	Bradford City AFC	16,130	19,487	11,075
4	Barnsley FC	12,527	18,282	10,709
5	Coventry City F.C.	12,363	26,741	9,220
6	Charlton Athletic FC	11,827	17,267	8,810
7	Plymouth Argyle FC	9,852	12,065	8,190
8	Luton Town FC	9,516	10,089	8,454
9	Bristol Rovers FC	8,320	10,009	6,851
10	Doncaster Rovers FC	8,098	12,794	6,473
11	Peterborough United FC	7,365	11,277	5,064
12	Oxford United FC	7,315	10,383	5,204
13	Southend United FC	6,932	10,779	5,110
14	Shrewsbury Town FC	6,451	9,635	5,216
15	Blackpool FC	5,517	15,871	2,388
16	Wycombe Wanderers FC	5,329	8,422	3,819
17	Gillingham FC	5,050	8,438	3,423
18	Walsall FC	4,927	7,868	3,287
19	AFC Wimbledon	4,297	4,850	3,499
20	Scunthorpe United FC	4,227	7,263	3,054
21	Rochdale AFC	3,574	6,546	2,301
22	Burton Albion FC	3,351	4,903	2,149
23	Fleetwood Town FC	3,165	5,035	2,304
24	Accrington Stanley FC	2,827	5,257	1,732
