= Inčukalns Municipality =

Former municipality of Latvia

Coordinates: 57°05′52″N 24°41′09″E

Inčukalns Municipality Inčukalna novads
- Municipality
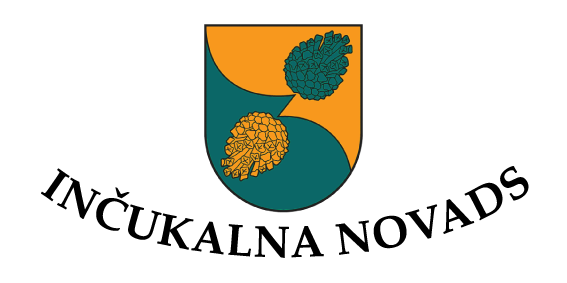
- Flag Coat of arms

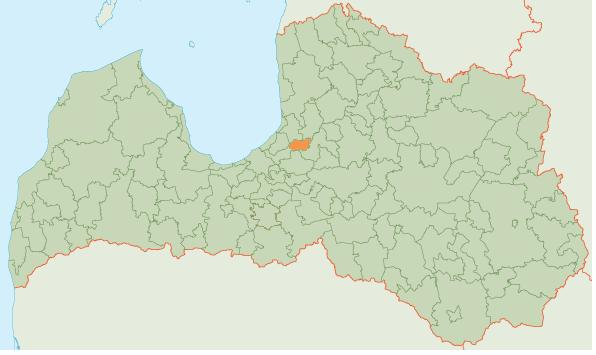
- Country: Latvia
- Formed: 2006
- Dissolved: 2021
- Centre: Inčukalns

Government
  - Chairman (last): Aivars Nalivaiko (LZS)

Area
  - Total: 111.83 km^{2} (43.18 sq mi)
  - Land: 109.27 km^{2} (42.19 sq mi)
  - Water: 2.56 km^{2} (0.99 sq mi)

Population (2021)
  - Total: 7,622
  - Density: 69.75/km^{2} (180.7/sq mi)
- Website: www.incukalns.lv

Inčukalns Municipality (Latvian: Inčukalna novads) was a municipality in Vidzeme, Latvia. The municipality was formed in 2006 by merging Inčukalns Parish of Riga district and Vangaži town, the administrative centre being Inčukalns. The population in 2020 was 7,640.

On 1 July 2021, Inčukalns Municipality ceased to exist. Inčukalns Parish was merged into Sigulda Municipality and Vangaži town was merged into Ropaži Municipality.

== Inčukalns underground gas storage ==
Inčukalns Underground Gas Storage facility, which helps to serve the Baltic States, is located in the municipality. The facility has a storage capacity of 4.47 bcm. The gas is stored approximately 800 meters underground. The facility is linked to the Balticconnector and is operated by Conexus Baltic Grid.

== See also ==
- Administrative divisions of Latvia (2009)
