= Sigulda Parish =

Administrative unit in Latvia

- parish of Latvia
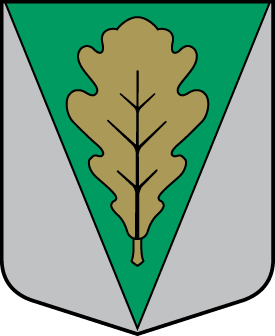
- Coat of arms

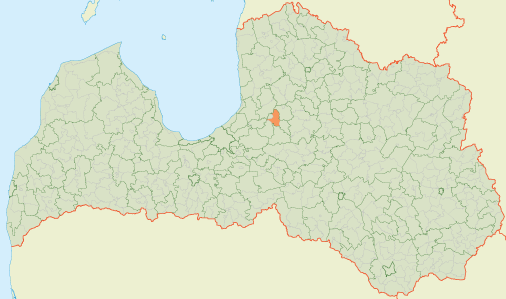
- Coordinates: 57°08′37″N 24°55′16″E
- Country: Latvia

Population (1 January 2026)
  - Total: 1,361

Sigulda parish is an administrative unit of the Sigulda Municipality in the Vidzeme region of Latvia.

- Peltes, Latvia - parish administrative center
