= Apēdājs =

Alt-rock and metal-fusion band from Mālpils, Latvia

aPēdājs
- Origin: Latvia, Mālpils
- Genres: Rock; Alternative rock; Metal
- Years active: 1996 - present
- Label: P3lican
- Members: Artūrs Jakovļevs; Edgars Špengelis; Lauris Polinskis
- Past members: Armands Butkevičs; Kaspars Grīnbergs; Aleksandrs Jakovļevs; Raivis Austriņš; Ilze Pelēkzirne; Mārcis Judzis; Artūrs Zeps

aPēdājs is a Latvian alternative rock, metal band from Mālpils. The band has released three albums with songs ranging from hard and alternative rock to metal.

== History ==
The band aPēdājs was founded in Mālpils, Latvia January 9, 1996. The first members of the band were Artūrs Jakovļevs (guitar, vocals, lyrics), Armands Butkevičs (drums) and Kaspars Grīnbergs (bass). aPēdājs had a variety of other artists play for them since their creation.

In 2007 aPēdājs experienced their biggest shakeup when the only remaining members were Artūrs Jakovļevs and Armands Butkevičs. At this time Lauris Polinskis joined as drummer and Armands Butkevičs switched to playing bass. Since this change they released their three albums and played the most concerts. In 2020 the band experienced departure of bass guitarist Armands Butkevičs who was later replaced by Edgars Špengelis.

== Lyrical content ==
Popular themes are relationships, death, sex, suicide, and pain. Since the release of their album “Sēras” the band has earned reputation in the media of being "a pessimistic, gloomy porno rock band". During interviews the band has shown their support for this statement.

== Discography ==
- Nāve pieskārās pārbaudīt pulsu (2018)
- Sēras (2016)
- Mana vārna (2012)
