= Inčukalns Parish =

Administrative unit in Latvia

- parish of Latvia
- Coat of arms

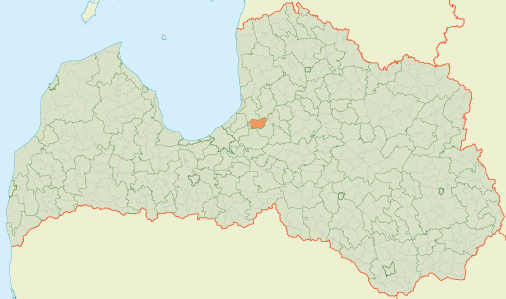
- Coordinates: 57°06′08″N 24°39′30″E
- Country: Latvia

Population (1 January 2026)
  - Total: 4,807

Inčukalns Parish is an administrative unit of Sigulda Municipality in the Vidzeme region of Latvia. From 2009 until 2021, it was part of Inčukalns Municipality.
