= Džemma Skulme =

Latvian artist (1925–2019)

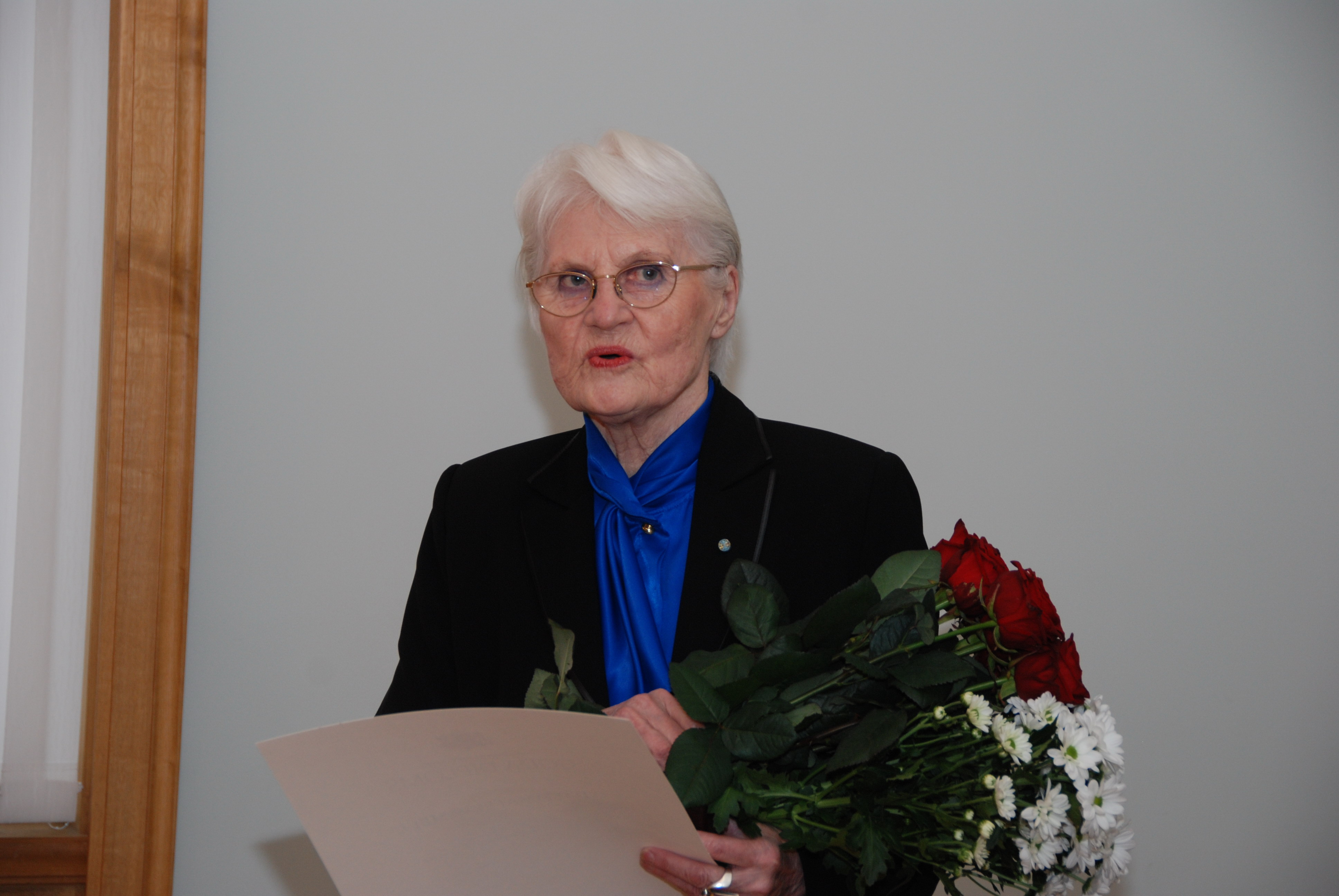
- Džemma Skulme receiving the Award of the Cabinet of Ministers in 2009
- Born: Džemma Lija Skulme; 20 September 1925; Riga, Latvia
- Died: 9 November 2019 (aged 94); Riga, Latvia
- Education: Leningrad Repin Institute
- Known for: Painting
- Movement: Modernism

Džemma Lija Skulme (20 September 1925 – 9 November 2019) was a Latvian artist and modernist painter. Džemma Skulme's personality played a paramount role in Latvian art development and social life of Latvia in the second half of the 20th century.

== Biography ==
Džemma Lija Skulme came from the Skulme family of artists. She was the daughter of Latvian painter Oto Skulme (1889-1967) and Latvia's first woman sculptor Marta Liepiņa - Skulme (1890–1962). Oto, Marta, and Džemma's uncle Uga Skulme were members of the Riga Artists Group who determined the development of art in Latvia in the 1930s.

In 1949 Džemma Skulme graduated from the Art Academy of Latvia pictorial art department and the 1955 Repin Art Institute. From 1956 she was an Artists’ Union of Latvia member and was its chair from 1982-1992. In 1976 she was given the honorary title of People's Artist of the Latvian SSR. Since 1993 she was the president of Jaunrades Foundation. In 1992 she was elected honorary member of the Latvian Academy of Sciences, and received an honorary doctor degree from the Art Academy of Latvia in 1998. In recognition of her work, the Latvian Art Higher Education Institutions Association honoured her with the degree Dr. honoris causa for her contribution to Latvian culture.

== Art ==
Džemma Skulme worked in oil, acrylic and water-colours. Beginning in the 1970s she developed the theme of the caryatid, wherein she endeavored to reveal the ethical and spiritual strength of a woman (The Women of Nica, 1968; Caryatid, 1979, and others). She also turned to a rifleman theme, Latvian ethnography and the principles of folk art. In her paintings of the second half of 1960s her worldview became more dramatic and she has raised the expressiveness of her work by using large brush or even palette knife for colour application. In pieces like Marta in Mask (1973), Valentīns Skulme as Richard III (1974), and Dialogue (1975) the artist depicts with spontaneous ease dramatic or heroic images full of life and spirit. In the middle of 1950s she also became recognized for her book and magazine illustrations.

During 1960s artist turns to author technique - combination of acrylic and oil colour thus creating interesting textures. Her painting during this time has become more conceptual. During latest decades Džemma is using naive stylistics of children drawings to create vivid and painterly virtuoso artworks. She has worked as assistant decorator in Daile Theatre and Latvia Puppet Theatre (1945-1947).

The Latvian art historian Laima Slava is accentuating the line as the discovery of 1960s in Džemma Skulme's creative work: “At first it is smooth and constructive and defines the shape of a character, then it becomes lighter and more transparent.”

== Selected works ==
- Summer, 1959, Latvian National Museum of Art
- Folk Song, 1969, Latvian National Museum of Art
- Macedonia motif, 1974, Latvian National Museum of Art

== Exhibitions ==
=== Solo exhibitions ===
Džemma Skulme participates in solo exhibitions since 1949: Riga (1968, 1985, 1992, 1994, 1995), Moscow (1969, 1984), Geneva (Switzerland), Milan (Italy, 1971), Vilnius (1976), Kale (France), Fredrikstadt (Norway, 1994, 1995), Cesis (1996), Kyiv (Ukraine, 1997), Family of Skulmes exhibition in West Berlin (1981), Pitsburg (USA, 1986), Bergamo (Italy, 1987), Riga (1998 – 1999).

=== Skulm's family exhibitions ===
Organized family exhibitions in West Berlin (1981); Pittsburgh (USA, 1986); Bergamo (Italy, 1987) and Riga (1998-1999).

=== Group exhibitions ===
Her works have been presented at the exhibitions in New York (1989), Munich, Bonn, Pitsburg (USA, ‘’Women Between Times: New Nations; New Art’’, 1993).

=== Works ===
Her works can be viewed at the Latvian National Museum of Art, Zimmerli Art Museum at Rutgers University (USA), Tretyakov Gallery (Russia).

Her works are also in private collections of individuals, including the president of Russia and the Queen of Denmark.

=== Dedication to the artist ===
In 1986, a documentary film "Džemma" was devoted to the artist at the Riga Film Studio. Its director - Laima Žurgina.
