= Jeļena Buraja =

Latvian banker

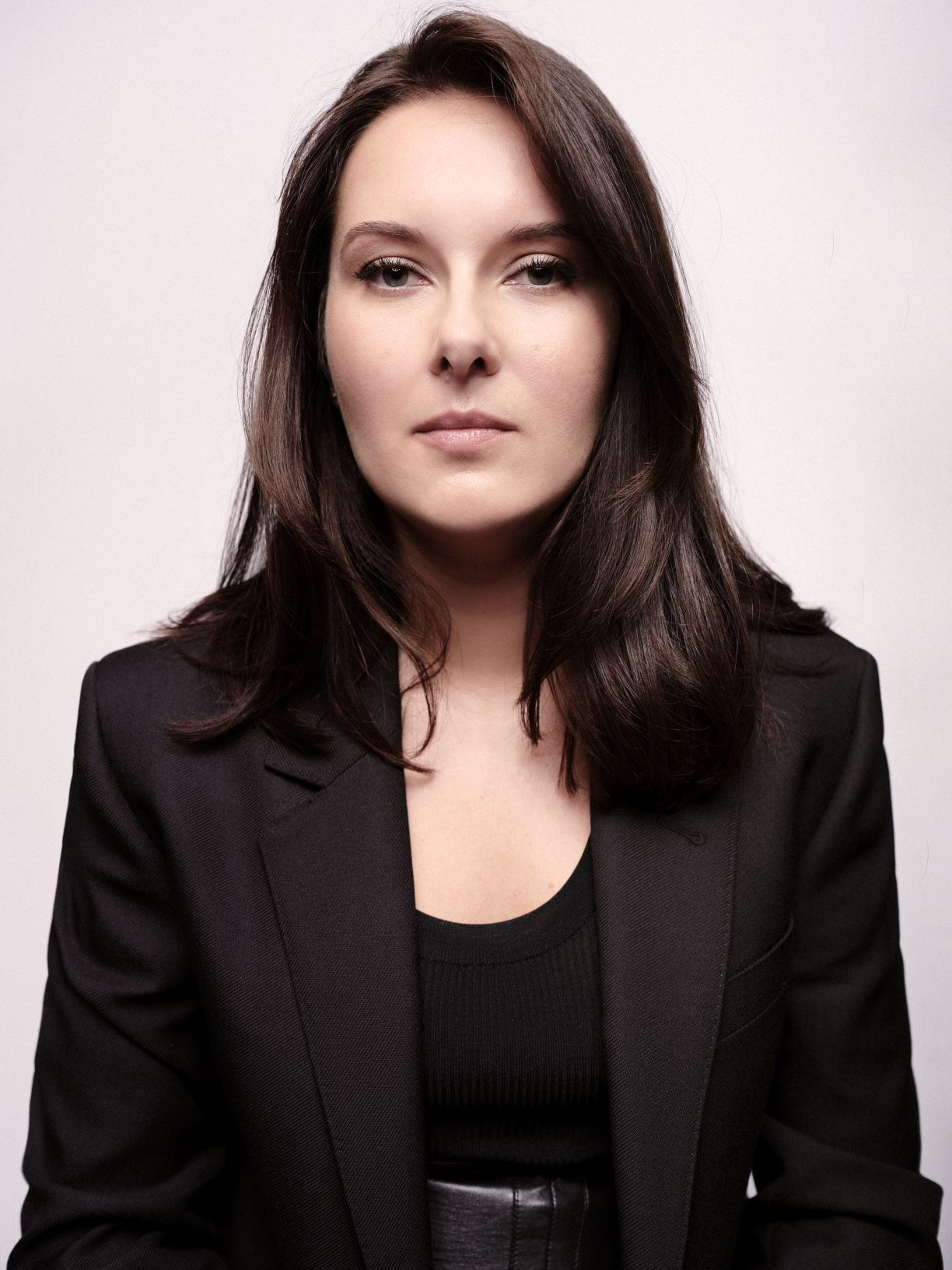
- Born: 1986 (age 39–40); Riga, Latvia
- Education: the University of Latvia
- Occupations: management, finances
- Awards: The Forbes 2023 "The 40 under 40" list

Jeļena Buraja (born in 1986 in Riga) is the Chairman of the Board of Rietumu Banka, the largest local capital bank in Latvia, and a member of the Council of the charitable foundation "Nākotnes Atbalsta fonds" (Future Supporting Fund).

In the Forbes 2023 The 40 Under 40 list, Buraja was recognized as the most successful woman in the field of finance in Latvia. She has held significant roles in various professional rankings of Latvian business leaders, such as being featured in The 40 Under 40 list in 2022, the top 100 successful business-women in 2021, and the talent list within the financial sector in 2020.

== Biography ==
=== Education ===
Jeļena Buraja was born in Riga, Latvia, in 1986. She graduated with honors from the University of Latvia with a master's degree in management science, specializing in environmental and business management, and studied in the cybernetics department. She participated in various master's and bachelor's programs at the Faculty of Law of the University of Latvia to supplement and enhance her knowledge.

She has also studied sustainable finance at the University of Cambridge Institute for Sustainability Leadership and completed a course in shipping business and shipping law in the United Kingdom. Additionally, she has undertaken several training courses in areas such as anti-money laundering (AML), tax legislation, international sanctions, corporate management, corporate lending, investments, financial technology, real estate management, psychology, public speaking, and more. Jeļena Buraja is an expert in corporate finance and mergers and acquisitions (M&A).

=== Career ===
Buraja began her career in 2006 in the real estate industry at BaltHaus, focusing on professional market research and project development. She joined Rietumu Banka in 2007 as a loan officer. Five years later, she became the head of one of the bank’s loan departments. In 2016, Jeļena Buraja was appointed vice president and later that year – a member of the Board. Since 2021, she has been the chairman of the Board of Rietumu Banka. Buraja oversees the operations of the bank and its Board, with responsibilities in corporate finance and investments, legal affairs, Rietumu Banka group companies (including real estate project development), correspondent relations and collaboration with financial institutions, marketing and public relations, and the implementation of sustainability (Environmental, Social, and Governance – ESG) strategies.

Since 2022, Buraja has been a member of the Council of the charitable foundation "Nākotnes Atbalsta fonds," which supports various social and cultural projects in Latvia. Since its establishment, the fund has supported over a thousand projects with a total sum of 10 million euros.

In her role at the "Nākotnes Atbalsta fonds," Jeļena Buraja oversees projects related to support for children, in the areas of medicine, social protection, education, sports, and development, as well as environmental protection projects.

== Public activities ==
In 2022, Jeļena Buraja spoke at the international ACAMS forum in New York, USA, dedicated to preventing financial crime, sharing the experience of Latvia's financial sector and Rietumu Banka, particularly in the recent period marked by the transformation of the national financial sector and its new quality level.

In 2023, she spoke at the summit of the Financial Women's Association (FWA) in New York, sharing insights into the challenges faced by Latvia's banking sector and focusing on Rietumu Banka's strategy, which reoriented its operations towards the Baltic market in a short period..

She participates in expeditions dedicated to exploring nature and rare and endangered species, including trips to South America and Africa, and is involved in making films about these expeditions.

== Personal life ==
Jeļena Buraja lives in Riga with her husband. She supports environmental and animal protection initiatives, collaborates with the Latvian Ornithological Society, supports programs for the conservation of black stork populations, and provides personal support to the wildlife aid organization Drauga Spārns.
