= Arkādijs Suharenko =

Rietumu Banka executive

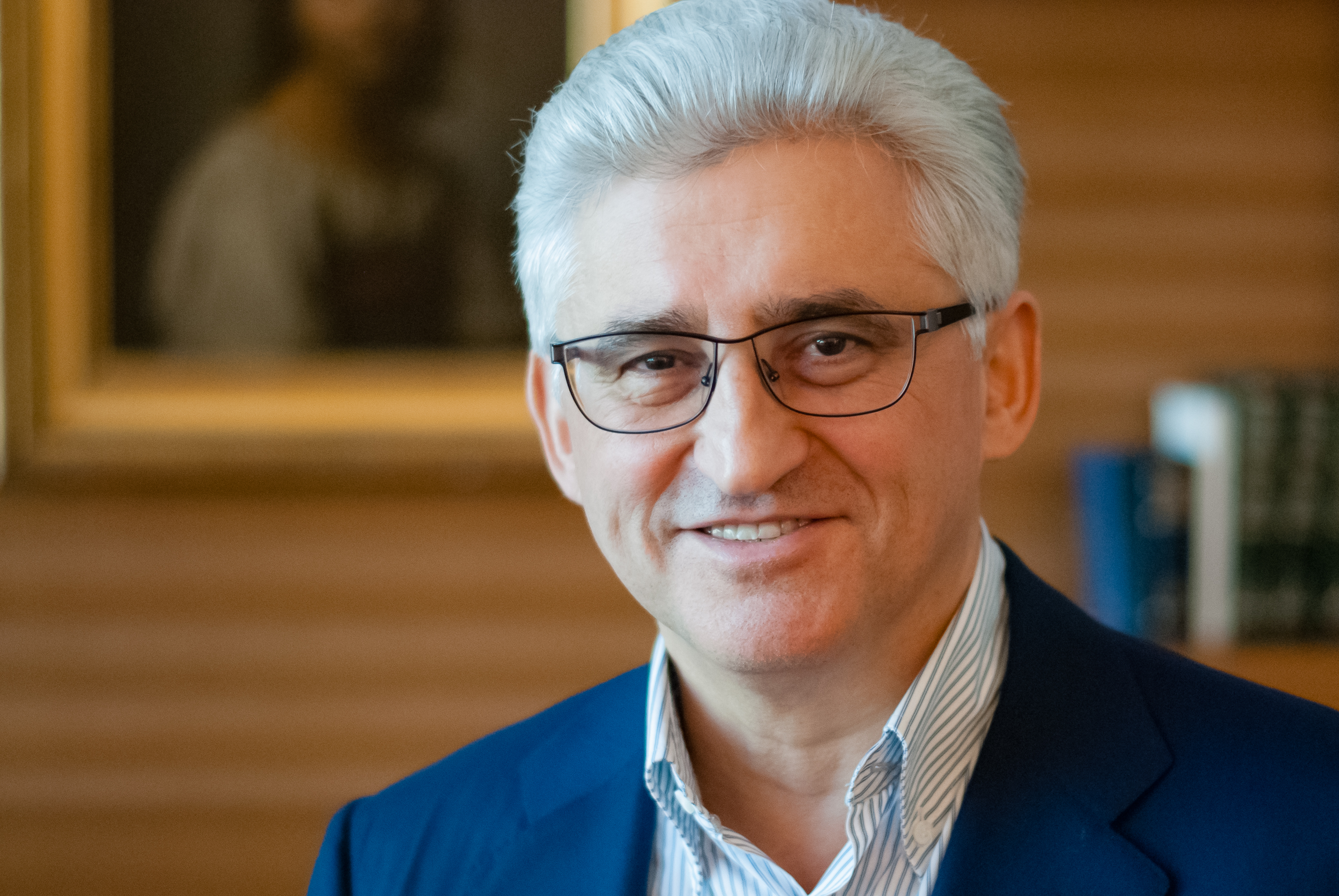
Arkādijs Suharenko

Arkādijs Suharenko (born May 30, 1959, in Postavy, Belarus) is a Latvian citizen, entrepreneur, deputy chairman of the council and one of the largest shareholders in Rietumu Banka, the largest Latvian bank with local capital and one of the four leading banks in the country. Chairman of the Council in charity foundation “Nākotnes Atbalsta fonds” (Future Supporting Fund). He is the recipient of the Order of the Three Stars. He is the head of the Latvian Jewish community. In the annual ranking "Millionaire" by the business magazine "Dienas bizness", he is recognized as one of the wealthiest people in Latvia.

== Biography ==
Arkādijs Suharenko was born on May 30, 1959, in Belarus. His family moved to Latvia. Parents: Father Isaac Suharenko (1925–1974) – military pilot, mother Tusya Suharenko (1928–2019) – philologist and librarian.

In 1976, he graduated from Riga Secondary School No. 54, and in 1981, he obtained an engineering degree from the Riga Polytechnic Institute (now Riga Technical University). He worked as a manager in construction and, since the late 1980s, has been involved in private entrepreneurship.

Since 1992, he has been one of the largest shareholders of Rietumu Banka, and through the Latvian company SIA "Suharenko Family Investments," owns 17.34% of the shares. He focused on establishing correspondent relationships with the bank's foreign partners, developing currency exchange operations, and has held the positions of vice president and president of the bank in different years.

On November 17, 2002, the President of Latvia Vaira Vīķe-Freiberga awarded Suharenko the highest state award, the Order of Three Stars, for special merits to the Fatherland in the fields of politics, public life, culture, and economy. Currently, he serves as the Deputy Chairman of the Council of Rietumu Banka. He oversees areas such as risk control, internal audit, finance, and accounting.

== Public activities ==
Suharenko is the leader of the Latvian Jewish community, active in its revival process since the mid-1990s. In 2002, he was elected President of the Riga Jewish Community. Since 2003, he has been the Chairman of the Council of Latvian Jewish Congregations and Communities. He is also a member of international Jewish organizations.

He oversaw the reconstruction of the Peitavas Street Synagogue in Riga, the creation of memorial complexes for the victims of the Holocaust in Latvia, the opening of the private kindergarten of the Jewish community in Riga, the allocation of new spacious premises to the Riga Jewish High School, and the renovation of the chapel in Riga's New Jewish Cemetery "Šmerli."

He initiated the process of restitution of the pre-war property of the Latvian Jewish community and participated in preparing the law "On compensation of good will to the Jewish community of Latvia", which entered into force in 2022.

== Philanthropy ==
Arkādijs Suharenko was the initiator of the charity fund "Future Supporting Fund" ("Nākotnes Atbalsta fonds") founded by Rietumu Banka. The Foundation annually supports projects throughout Latvia in the areas of health care and children's medicine, social projects for the vulnerable population, culture, and art in Latvia and Europe, support for young talents and education, sports, children's and youth sports, restoration of architectural monuments and historical artifacts, and improvement of the urban environment. Arkādijs Suharenko is the chairman of the Council of the Future Supporting Fund; he determines the fund's operational strategy and participates in implementing charity projects. Since its establishment in 2007, the foundation has supported more than a thousand charity projects worth ten million euros.

He also supports the medical industry; some projects include the renovation of Children's Clinical University Hospital, purchasing medical equipment for newborns, and funding the Disaster Medical Center and regional hospitals. In 2022, "Rietumu Banka" and the Future Supporting Fund supported the treatment of children as part of the “Eņģeļi pār Latviju" ("Angels above Latvia") campaign.

On the initiative of Arkādijs Suharenko, the competition "Looking for a heart nurse” has been regularly organized in Latvia to raise the prestige of this profession in society by awarding the best nurses and awarding them cash prizes from the Future Supporting Fund. Arkādijs Suharenko traditionally participates in the award ceremony held in the Presidential Palace. Latvian presidents Valdis Zatlers, Andris Bērziņš, Raimonds Vējonis, Egils Levits and spouses of the presidents, who were patrons of the competition, have presented prizes to the laureates.

Arkādijs Suharenko participates in supporting talented children and young people by awarding targeted scholarships for professional education. He has been the initiator of providing support for the annual competition “Ineses Galantes talanti” ("Talents of Inese Galante"), in which all participants take part for free.

At the suggestion of Arkādijs Suharenko, the competition “Latvijas sakrālais mantojums” ("Sacred Heritage of Latvia") has been regularly held in Latvia since 2012, organized by the Future Supporting Fund in cooperation with the Latvian National Cultural Heritage Administration. As part of the competition, all religious denominations in Latvia receive funding from the Future Supporting Fund. In recent years, the foundation has allocated more than 300,000 euros for the restoration of approximately 80 objects of sacred architecture and art in Latvia.

== Personal life ==
Arkādijs Suharenko collects paintings, sculptures, and books on the history of the Jewish people. He owns the largest collection of Judaic objects in the Baltic States and also deals with the restoration of historical buildings, including renovating houses that are architectural monuments and form the cultural heritage of Latvia: in Old Riga, in the historical Riga Mežapark district, and in Jūrmala. Arkādijs Suharenko resides in Jurmala. He has been married since 1982, has three children and five grandchildren.
