= More Parish =

Administrative unit in Latvia

- parish of Latvia
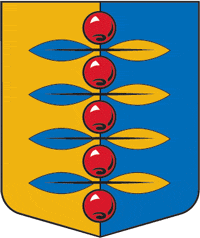
- Coat of arms

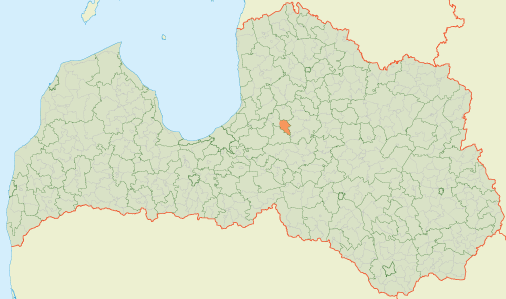
- Coordinates: 57°04′30″N 25°03′48″E
- Country: Latvia

Population (1 January 2026)
  - Total: 584

More parish is an administrative unit of the Sigulda Municipality in the Vidzeme region of Latvia.

More, Latvia – parish administrative center
