= Dermot Desmond =

Irish businessman and financier

- Born: 14 August 1950 (age 76); Macroom, County Cork, Ireland
- Occupation: Largest individual shareholder within Celtic Football Club
- Spouse: Pat Desmond
- Children: 4

Dermot Desmond (born 14 August 1950) is an Irish businessman and financier. He is estimated to be worth €2.04 billion and is ranked by the Sunday Independent as the ninth-richest person in Ireland.Desmond has a long standing association with Celtic Football Club plc, often misreported as being the clubs owner.

== Early life and education ==
Desmond was born in Macroom, County Cork in 1950 and grew up in Marino, Dublin. He was educated at Scoil Mhuire, Marino and Good Counsel College in New Ross. He left school in 1968 to work at Citibank in Dublin.

== Business career ==
In 1968, Desmond's business career began with Citibank in Dublin, followed by Price Waterhouse in Kabul, Afghanistan. In 1981, he founded National City Brokers in Dublin. The company competed with already established stockbroking names in Dublin such as Davy's and Goodbody. Desmond sold the company to Ulster Bank in 1994, which at the time was part of the National Westminster Group, for a reported £39 million. Subsequently, as a result of Natwest's takeover in 2003 by RBS, NCB was bought out by its management with the support of former billionaire businessman Sean Quinn who was believed at that time to control 25% of the company.

Desmond was appointed chairman of the board of Aer Rianta in 1990 under the Charles Haughey government, but resigned in October 1991 amid the scandal over the purchase of the Johnston Mooney & O'Brien site by Telecom Éireann.

In 1995, Desmond founded International Investment & Underwriting (IIU), a private equity firm and his primary investment vehicle. It is located in Ireland's International Financial Services Centre (IFSC) at IFSC House and is regulated by the Irish Financial Services Regulatory Authority. Companies that are controlled through IIU include Daon, Inc. (a biometric enabling technology company). IIU Asset Strategies Limited is the hedge fund arm of the company, offering convertible bonds and equity funds.

In 1997, together with business partners John Magnier and J.P. McManus, Desmond purchased the five-star Barbados resort Sandy Lane Hotel. The hotel underwent a US$450 million renovation and was re-opened in 2001.

Desmond purchased London City Airport from Mowlem for £23.5 million in 1995. The investment was considered a large risk as London's Docklands was in recession and the neighbouring Canary Wharf development was in receivership. The airport has since become one of the more profitable in the United Kingdom. Desmond sold London City Airport in October 2006 for a reported £750 million to a consortium consisting of insurer AIG, GE Capital and Credit Suisse.

BETDAQ is the trading name of Global Betting Exchange, a betting exchange operator based in Ireland. It is the second largest betting exchange operator in the country. The company was founded in 2000 by Desmond and started trading in September 2001. Its headquarters are in the International Financial Services Centre in Dublin. Desmond sold BETDAQ to Ladbrokes for €30 million in 2013 and is a shareholder at the bookmaker as a result of the deal. In November 2021, Desmond bought BETDAQ back from the Entain group (owner of Ladbrokes Coral) for an "undisclosed sum" before finally selling it to rival betting exchange Matchbook in October 2026.

Desmond was a major shareholder in Irish food company Greencore for several years. He sold his shares in 2006.

In 2005, Desmond opened the Sporting Emporium, a Dublin-based private members gaming club. It was reported Desmond had invested €5.5 million in the venture. After being open for only seven months it faced closure.

Desmond purchased 33.1% of Latvian Rietumu Banka in 2005 for a reported €66 million. He invested in the bank as a result of being very impressed with its management team and capital structure. The investment in Rietumu initially looked a successful one with Desmond's holding at one stage being valued at €200 million. However, the subsequent economic downturn has reduced the value of Desmond's holding in the bank significantly.

In August 2008, Desmond was offered the position of chairman of the Irish airline Aer Lingus. Desmond turned down the offer citing prior commitments as a factor which would not allow him the sufficient time necessary to do the job. Former GPA chief operating officer and current Babcock & Brown Air chief executive Colm Barrington was subsequently named chairman of Aer Lingus.

On 19 September 2018, it was announced that Desmond had increased his stake in Toronto mining company Mountain Province Diamonds to 28%. The company's sole asset is the Canadian Gahcho Kue Diamond Mine Project.

In September 2018, he secured planning permission to construct a 17,168 sq ft. palatial mansion on Shrewsbury Road in the D4 postal district of Dublin. In gaining approval for the ambitious mansion plan, Desmond was also given permission to demolish the existing house, "Walford", the most expensive house ever sold in Ireland at €58 million in 2005.

=== Glackin report ===
In 1991, a company law inspector, solicitor John Glackin, was appointed by the then Government to investigate complicated dealings involving Desmond and the purchase and sale of the former Johnston Mooney & O'Brien site in Ballsbridge, Dublin. While Desmond represented himself as an intermediary in the sale, Glackin's report said Desmond, businessman JP McManus and John Magnier were beneficiaries of the sale. Desmond strenuously disputed Glackin's findings. According to the Glackin Report, Hoddle Investments (the vehicle through which the deal was handled) executed two contracts with Telecom Éireann for the sale of the Johnston Mooney & O'Brien site for an aggregate price of £9.4 million, on 7 May 1990. The proceeds of the sale were lodged to an NCB account.

According to the Moriarty Tribunal report, the next day, on 8 May 1990, £206,613.57 was withdrawn from one NCB account, converted into sterling £200,000 and transferred to the Aurum Nominees No.6 account at NCB (proxied to an offshore Ansbacher Cayman account) held for the benefit of then Taoiseach, Charles Haughey. Aurum Nominees Limited was a company established by NCB for the benefit of its clients, and used at the time by several of the beneficiaries to the deal, including JP McManus, Lochlann Quinn and Martin Naughton. Quinn and Naughton were owed money by Desmond and he used the proceeds of the sale to pay off his debt to them, according to the report.

=== Flood Tribunal ===
Desmond gave evidence relating to the Century Radio module of the Flood Tribunal. He stated he had given former Fianna Fáil press secretary PJ Mara a loan of £46,000 between 1986 and 1989, as Mara said he had run into financial difficulties. Desmond said he made the payments by cheque.

=== Moriarty Tribunal ===
The Moriarty Tribunal found that Desmond made substantial payments to Taoiseach Charles Haughey. In September 1994, Desmond made a payment of £100,000 sterling to Haughey and in October 1996 he made a payment of £25,000 sterling. While Desmond claims these payments to be loans, repayable by Haughey, the Tribunal did not accept this explanation. Ultimately Haughey was forced to settle with the Revenue Commissioners, as it appears he had failed to declare the payments from Desmond.

The Tribunal noted that the payments were made via the Swiss bank account of a company called Anesia Etablissement, Banque Scandinave en Suisse, Case Postale 901, 1211 Geneva 3, of which Desmond was the beneficial owner, via an account at Henry Ansbacher & Company to an account at Cayman International Bank Trust Company, held for Haughey's benefit. £25,000 was paid via Desmonds's Bottin International Investments Limited which had an account with Anglo Irish Bank, 69 Athol Street, Douglas, Isle of Man. Desmond said Haughey asked him for the money in 1996 because of "a shortage of funds".

Desmond also loaned money to Feltrim plc, which was at the time managed by Charles Haughey's son, Conor Haughey. In August 1991, Desmond loaned the company £55,000, made up of £40,000 loaned on 12 August 1991 and £15,000 on 28 August 1991. Conor Haughey told the Tribunal that the company was in danger of being liquidated and he approached Desmond for the money. The loan was never repaid, and was instead converted into equity.

=== Celtic Mist ===
Desmond also paid £75,456 for the refurbishment of Haughey's yacht, the Celtic Mist, between 1990 and 1991, at a time according to the Tribunal, that Haughey earned between £69,764 and £72,354 a year as Taoiseach. Desmond said this payment was a loan, but the Tribunal disagreed, stating again that Haughey had settled with the Revenue Commissioners in relation to the sum, having failed to pay Capital Gains Tax at the time. The Tribunal also found that the yacht itself amounted to an indirect benefit to Haughey. This was despite it being unable to find the source of the £167,073.90 paid for the yacht. Haughey's son Conor told the Tribunal in 1999 that he had learned money to refurbish the yacht had come from the bank account of Freezone Limited. Money from the sale of the Johnston Mooney & O'Brien site had ended up in the same account – a revelation that Conor Haughey said he was "very concerned" about.

The yacht was subsequently given to the Irish Whale and Dolphin Group by the family of Haughey and now operates as a maritime research vessel.

=== Esat Digifone ===
Desmond was an investor in Esat Digifone through his International Investment Underwriters (IIU) vehicle, ultimately owning 20% of the company. It was reported that he made up to £100 million in profit after selling his stake in Esat.

=== Football ===
Desmond is the largest individual shareholder of the Scottish Premiership football club Celtic. Desmond previously held a stake in Manchester United. He sold the stake to Malcolm Glazer in 2005.

In October 2019, Desmond purchased a 25% stake in League of Ireland club Shamrock Rovers.

=== Horse racing ===
Desmond's racehorse Commanche Court won the Triumph Hurdle (1997), the Irish Grand National (2000), the Punchestown Gold Cup (2000), the Lismullen Hurdle (1998), the Christmas Hurdle (1998) and the Spring Juvenile Hurdle (1997).

== Business holdings ==
Desmond's past and present business interests and investment holdings include;

- Baltimore Technologies
- Bank of Ireland
- Barchester Healthcare
- BETDAQ betting exchange
- Bottin (International) Investments Ltd. (2004)
- Castlebeck Group
- Celtic
- Daon, Inc.
- Datalex
- Dedeir Limited
- Execujet
- Freezone Investments Ltd. (Isle of Man-based investment company)
- GIS software house eSpatial
- GOS Networks
- Greencore
- International Investment Underwriters (IIU)
- Intuition Publishing Ltd. (eLearning Company)
- London City Airport
- Lydian
- MHC Mental Health Care
- Newfoundland & Labrador Refining Ltd.
- Neovia (2008)
- Prematur (2008)
- Premier Fleet Management and Contract Hire Ltd
- Rietumu Banka
- Sandy Lane Hotel
- Space Technology Ireland Ltd
- Sporting Emporium Casino
- Shamrock Rovers
- U4EA Technologies
- Young Foundation
- Mountain Province Diamonds
