= Conexus Baltic Grid =

Latvian natural gas transmission and storage operator

- Native name: AS "Conexus Baltic Grid"
- Type: Joint-stock company
- Industry: Natural gas transmission and storage
- Founded: 22 December 2016
- Headquarters: Stigu iela 14, Riga, Latvia
- Services: Natural gas transmission, natural gas storage
- Revenue: 76,467,879 euro (2023)
- Net income: 16,171,765 euro (2023)
- Total assets: 469,284,474 euro (2023)
- Owner: Augstsprieguma tīkls (68.46%)
- Number of employees: 361 (2023)
- Website: www.conexus.lv

Conexus Baltic Grid (legal name AS "Conexus Baltic Grid") is a Latvian natural gas transmission and storage system operator headquartered in Riga. It was established in December 2016 during the unbundling of the vertically integrated gas utility Latvijas Gāze, and the present joint-stock company was registered in Latvia on 2 January 2017. The company operates the Latvian gas transmission system and the Inčukalns underground gas storage facility.

Conexus is a regulated infrastructure company in the Latvian and regional gas market. Its largest shareholder is the state-owned electricity transmission system operator Augstsprieguma tīkls (AST), which increased its holding to 68.46 percent in 2020 after acquiring Gazprom's stake in the company.

== History ==
Conexus Baltic Grid was created as part of the liberalisation and unbundling of Latvia's natural gas market. On 22 December 2016, shareholders of Latvijas Gāze voted to establish Conexus as a separate company to operate Latvia's main gas pipelines and the regional underground gas storage infrastructure. The company was registered in the Commercial Register on 2 January 2017, with registration number 40203041605.

On 5 January 2017, the Public Services Regulatory Commission issued Conexus licences for natural gas transportation and storage in Latvia and for storage in the Inčukalns underground gas storage facility. The licences were issued for a 20-year period, from 5 January 2017 to 4 January 2037.

In 2018, the European Commission reviewed the certification of Conexus as a gas transmission system operator. The Commission opinion noted that Conexus operated the Latvian gas transmission system and Inčukalns underground gas storage, and that the company had been set up when Latvijas Gāze was reorganised into separate structural units. The certification process was linked to ownership-unbundling concerns. Natural Gas World reported in October 2018 that the Latvian regulator had certified Conexus on conditions related to the holdings of Gazprom and Marguerite-linked investors in both Conexus and Latvijas Gāze.

== Ownership ==
After the initial unbundling, Conexus had a shareholder structure similar to that of Latvijas Gāze, including Gazprom, Marguerite Fund, Uniper Ruhrgas International and Itera Latvija. In December 2017, the Latvian government announced that AST would acquire an 18.31 percent stake in Conexus from Uniper as part of a policy goal to secure majority state control over the gas transmission and storage operator. LSM later reported that AST paid €57.394 million for a 34.36 percent stake after acquiring shares from Uniper and Itera Latvija.

In December 2019, The Baltic Times reported that Gazprom had sold its 34.09911 percent stake in Conexus at an electronic auction, while the Latvian government still had to decide whether to use a pre-emptive right regarding the shares.

In April 2020, Marguerite Fund closed the sale of its 29.06 percent interest in Conexus to MM Capital Infrastructure Fund 1, a Marubeni-backed infrastructure fund. In July 2020, AST acquired Gazprom's 34.10 percent stake, increasing its control in Conexus to 68.46 percent. The Latvian Ministry of Economics described the transaction as securing national control over Latvia's gas transmission and storage system.

== Operations ==
Conexus operates the Latvian natural gas transmission network and the Inčukalns underground gas storage facility. The Nordic Investment Bank describes the company as a unified natural gas transmission and storage system operator in Latvia, with a 1,188 km transmission network connecting the Latvian gas market with Lithuania, Estonia and Russia. Conexus states that its transmission system directly connects the Latvian gas market with Lithuania and Estonia and that it provides transmission and storage services to gas traders under tariffs set by the regulator.

The Inčukalns storage facility is a major element of the company's operations. The Nordic Investment Bank states that the storage facility can have capacity of up to 2.3 billion cubic metres and can supply about a third of regional gas consumption. Conexus states that the active gas capacity of the Inčukalns facility can reach up to 2.3 billion cubic metres, and that traders use the storage facility as a strategically located storage point.

Conexus also participates in the regional gas market arrangements linking Latvia with neighbouring gas systems. The Latvian Ministry of Economics stated in 2020 that Conexus was responsible for regional gas flows in the gas market established on 1 January 2020, which united Latvia, Estonia and Finland. The Public Utilities Commission approved Conexus's capacity-auction calendar for the 2022/2023 Inčukalns storage cycle and stated that the system operator had to publish a regulator-agreed calendar for the next storage cycle on its website by 10 January each year.

== Infrastructure projects ==
Conexus has been involved in projects to upgrade the Inčukalns storage facility and related transmission infrastructure. In 2021, the Nordic Investment Bank granted a loan for upgrading Inčukalns underground gas storage and renovating the Inčukalns UGS–Izborsk transmission pipeline. The bank stated that the projects were scheduled for completion by the end of 2025 and had total investment costs of approximately €104 million.

The Inčukalns storage upgrade was also included in the European Union's CEF Energy programme as Project of Common Interest 8.2.4. A European Commission/CINEA project fiche listed the implementation schedule as October 2018 to December 2025, total eligible costs of €88 million and a maximum EU contribution of €44 million. The project fiche stated that the works were aimed at improving the operational efficiency of the existing underground gas storage facility, including surface infrastructure, wells and compression units.

In January 2021, French gas transmission operator GRTgaz signed a service agreement with Conexus. The agreement covered technical expertise, project management, research and development, and information systems in connection with grid modernisation and energy-transition issues.
