= NCB Group =

- Company type: Private
- Industry: Investment Banking
- Founded: 1981 in Dublin, Ireland
- Founder: Dermot Desmond
- Headquarters: Dublin, Ireland
- Number of locations: 2
- Area served: Worldwide
- Services: Institutional equities, Corporate finance, Wealth management, Investment funds & Debt securities, Venture capital
- Website: www.ncb.ie

NCB Group was an investment bank based in Dublin, Ireland. Founded by Dermot Desmond, NCB firmly established its reputation by sponsoring a yacht NCB Ireland in the 1989 Whitbread Round-the-world yacht race, now the Volvo Ocean Race.

It was taken over by Investec and rebranded in 2013.

== History ==
During the 1980s after Ireland's two biggest banks Allied Irish Banks and Bank of Ireland took interests in stockbroking firms, NCB was sold to Ulster Bank, a subsidiary of National Westminster Bank.

After National Westminster was taken over by the Royal Bank of Scotland, NCB was bought out by its management with the assistance of Sean Quinn.

NCB sold its money broking arm to management and employees in 2004.

Investors in a fund started by the venture capital arm of NCB, NCB Ventures, realized a 75% return on their investment when the fund closed in 2006.

== See also ==
- Irish Stock Exchange
- Irish Property Bubble
- Volvo Ocean Race
