= Betdaq =

Irish gambling company

- Type: Private
- Industry: Gambling
- Founded: 2000
- Founder: Dermot Desmond
- Defunct: October 2026
- Headquarters: International Financial Services Centre, Dublin, Ireland
- Area served: United Kingdom; Ireland
- Key people: Dermot Desmond (Executive Chairman), Noel Browne (Operations Director)
- Products: Betting exchange, sports betting, online casino
- Website: www.betdaq.com

Betdaq is an Irish gambling company founded in 2000. It operates the world's second largest online betting exchange. Its product offering also includes sports betting and online casino. Business operations are conducted from its headquarters in Dublin, alongside a satellite office in Gibraltar.

In 2013, Betdaq was sold to Ladbrokes for €30m but in November 2021, the company was sold back to its original owner, Dermot Desmond, for an undisclosed sum before finally being sold to rival betting exchange Matchbook in October 2026.

== Business ==
As a betting exchange operator, Betdaq currently holds an approximate 7% market share. Betdaq allows people with different opinions on the likely outcome of an event to bet against each other. A betting exchange allows people to bet against each other rather than against a bookmaker.

Betdaq offers betting markets on a range of international sporting and other events and claims to handle in excess of £75 million worth of bets every week. Betdaq brings together bettors from around the world and allows gamblers to bet against one another, rather than using a bookmaker. Betdaq charges a commission on all winning bets, which is set at 2 percent of the net winnings for most markets; this can vary depending on the amount of commission that is paid.

== Operations ==
Since Betdaq was launched in 2000 it has become the second largest online betting exchange company in the UK and the largest betting exchange technology provider in the world. Betdaq operate a number of sports betting brokerages and websites from a central exchange hub providing partners with market pricing for sports wagering and risk management. The central Global Betting Exchange Alderney (GBEA) hub matches in excess of £75 million worth of bets from members and brokerages around the world each week to a value in excess of $7 billion annually. It has a team of 50 IT developers and has invested in excess of $30 million in the platform to date.

In early 2011, Betdaq finalised a deal for technology software from GTS, a CryptoLogic Inc company, and soft launched Betdaq Games which it integrated into the network.

In October 2012, Betdaq launched BetdaqNFL, a dedicated micro site that offers live streamed video match commentary direct from the USA. This site is dedicated entirely to the NFL and contains live NFL video previews along with results, chat and tips from resident pundit John Arnette.

== Sponsorship ==
In January 2011, Betdaq penned a "six-figure" deal with Kempton Park Racecourse which allowed Betdaq account holders complimentary access to Kempton Park on Wednesday night fixtures. The arrangement also meant that 176 races would be sponsored by Betdaq over the year.

In July 2011, Betdaq became the official online betting partner of Celtic Football Club. The partnership was announced at a ceremony held a Celtic Park by Sky Sport pundit Alan McInally, the former Scotland striker who works as a brand ambassador for Betdaq.

In September 2011, Betdaq became a sponsor of London Irish Rugby Club. Under the terms of the agreement, the Betdaq logo was displayed on the back of London Irish team shirts for all Aviva Premiership games and Heineken Cup matches. They are set to be Sunderland AFC's sponsor for the 18/19 league one season.

In the 2018/19 season, Betdaq sponsored Sunderland A.F.C. despite their relegation to the third tier of English football.

== See also ==
- Betting exchange companies
- Bookmaker
- Gambling
- Matched betting
- Parimutuel gambling
- Prediction market
- Sports betting
- Spread betting
