= Daon, Inc. =

Biometrics and identity assurance software company

- Type: Private
- Industry: Software & Biometrics
- Founded: 2000 in Dublin, Ireland
- Headquarters: Fairfax, Virginia, U.S.
- Products: IdentityX; VeriFLY; DaonEngine
- Website: www.daon.com

Daon (pronounced "day-on") is a biometrics and identity assurance software company founded in 2000 by Irish entrepreneur Dermot Desmond. The company's name, according to Daon, derives from an "Old Irish word for human." Daon’s U.S. headquarters are in Fairfax, Virginia, with additional operations in the International Financial Services Center (IFSC) in Dublin, Ireland. The company also has regional and sales offices in Serbia and Australia.

Daon provides several products in identity verification and biometric software, including IdentityX, VeriFLY, and DaonEngine. VeriFLY, for instance, has been used as a COVID-19 health credential application, facilitating safe travel and other secure transactions.

== History ==
Founded in 2000, Daon initially operated out of Dublin, Ireland.

In 2006, former United States Secretary of Homeland Security Tom Ridge joined the company’s board. That same year, Daon partnered with the American Association of Airport Executives (AAAE) to establish the Security Biometric Clearing Network (SBCN), a joint venture aimed at providing biometric identity management services, including enrollment, background checks, secure information storage, and card issuance.

In August 2008, Daon acquired software assets and staff from Enterprise Air, a New York-based company specializing in physical security solutions.

By 2015, Daon counted Atom Bank in the UK among its clients. In 2017, Daon’s IdentityX platform was adopted by financial institutions like Visa, Mastercard, USAA, and BNP Paribas to enhance digital banking security. In July 2019, Daon launched an upgraded version of IdentityX, Digital Onboarding 2.0.

In response to the COVID-19 pandemic, Daon introduced the VeriFLY app to facilitate health credential verification for travelers. By 2022, VeriFLY was being used by Carnival Cruise Lines and American Airlines to "streamline" health documentation and vaccination verification processes.

Daon is reportedly majority-owned by a Cayman Islands-based entity. The company reported after-tax profits of approximately €220,000 in 2023.

== Products ==
The company's IdentityX platform is designed to authenticate users on mobile devices using biometrics rather than passwords. IdentityX incorporates multiple methods, including facial recognition, voice recognition, and fingerprint scanning, to verify a user's identity. As of 2015, IdentityX was one of several products certified by the FIDO Alliance. Also in 2015, IdentityX won NACUSO's "Next Big Idea" competition and received a "Best in Show" award from the CUNA Technology Council.
