= Mālpils Parish =

Parish of Latvia

Coordinates: 57°00′38″N 24°57′35″E

Mālpils Parish Mālpils pagasts
- Parish
- Coat of arms

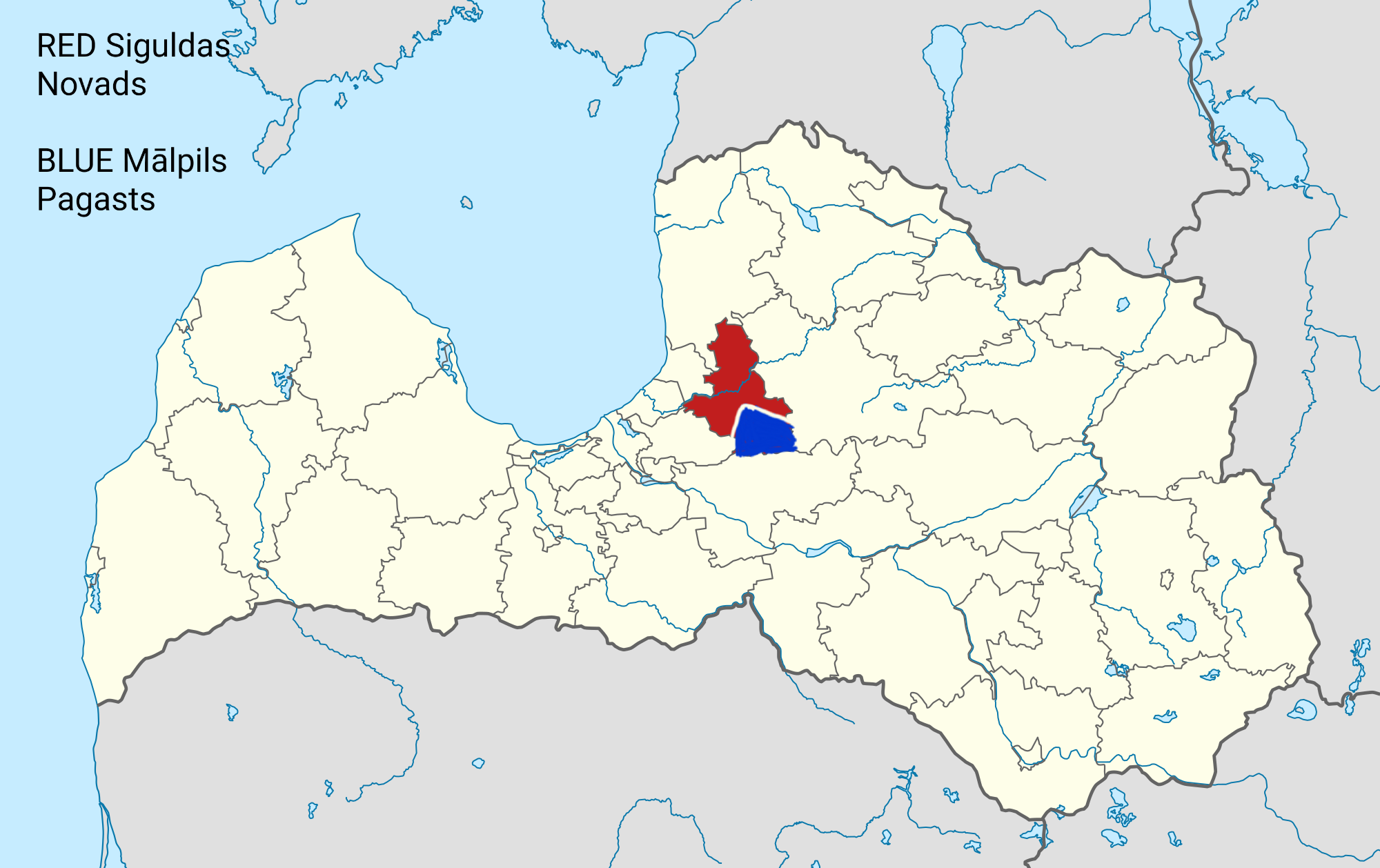
- Parish within Sigulda Municipality
- Country: Latvia
- Municipality: Sigulda
- Formed: 19th century
- Current form: 2021
- Centre: Mālpils

Area
  - Total: 220.84 km^{2} (85.27 sq mi)
  - Land: 212.54 km^{2} (82.06 sq mi)
  - Water: 8.3 km^{2} (3.2 sq mi)

Population (2026)
  - Total: 3,324
  - Density: 15.64/km^{2} (40.51/sq mi)

Mālpils Parish (Latvian: Mālpils pagasts) is an administrative unit of Sigulda Municipality in the Vidzeme region of Latvia. From 2009 to 2021 it was a separate municipality – Mālpils Municipality. The administrative centre is Mālpils.

The last Council Chair of Mālpils Municipality was Solvita Strausa from the United for Mālpils list.

== Images ==
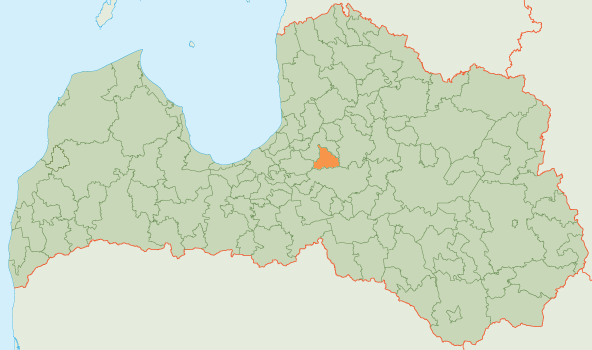
Map of Mālpils Municipality (2009–2021)

Coat of arms of Mālpils Municipality (2010–2021)

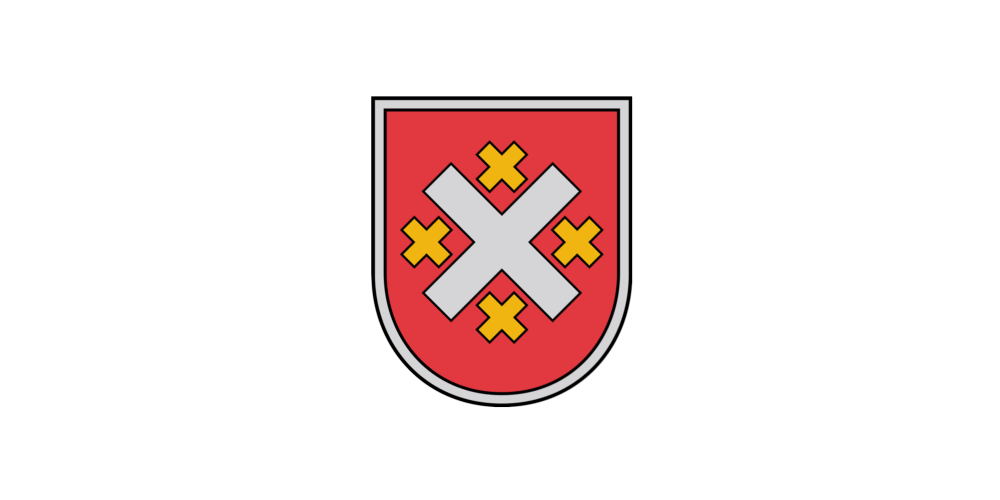
Flag of Mālpils Municipality
