= Allaži Parish =

Parish of Latvia

- parish of Latvia
- Coat of arms

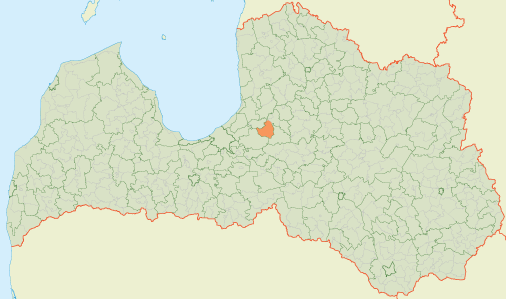
- 57°02′54″N 24°47′16″E
- Country: Latvia

Area
  - Total: 156.43 km^{2} (60.40 sq mi)
  - Land: 153.48 km^{2} (59.26 sq mi)
  - Water: 2.95 km^{2} (1.14 sq mi)

Population (1 January 2024)
  - Total: 1,779
  - Density: 11/km^{2} (29/sq mi)

Allaži Parish (Latvian: Allažu pagasts) is an administrative unit of Sigulda Municipality in the Vidzeme region of Latvia.
