= Sigulda Municipality =

Municipality of Latvia

Coordinates: 57°09′N 24°52′E

Sigulda Municipality Siguldas novads
- Municipality
- Flag Coat of arms

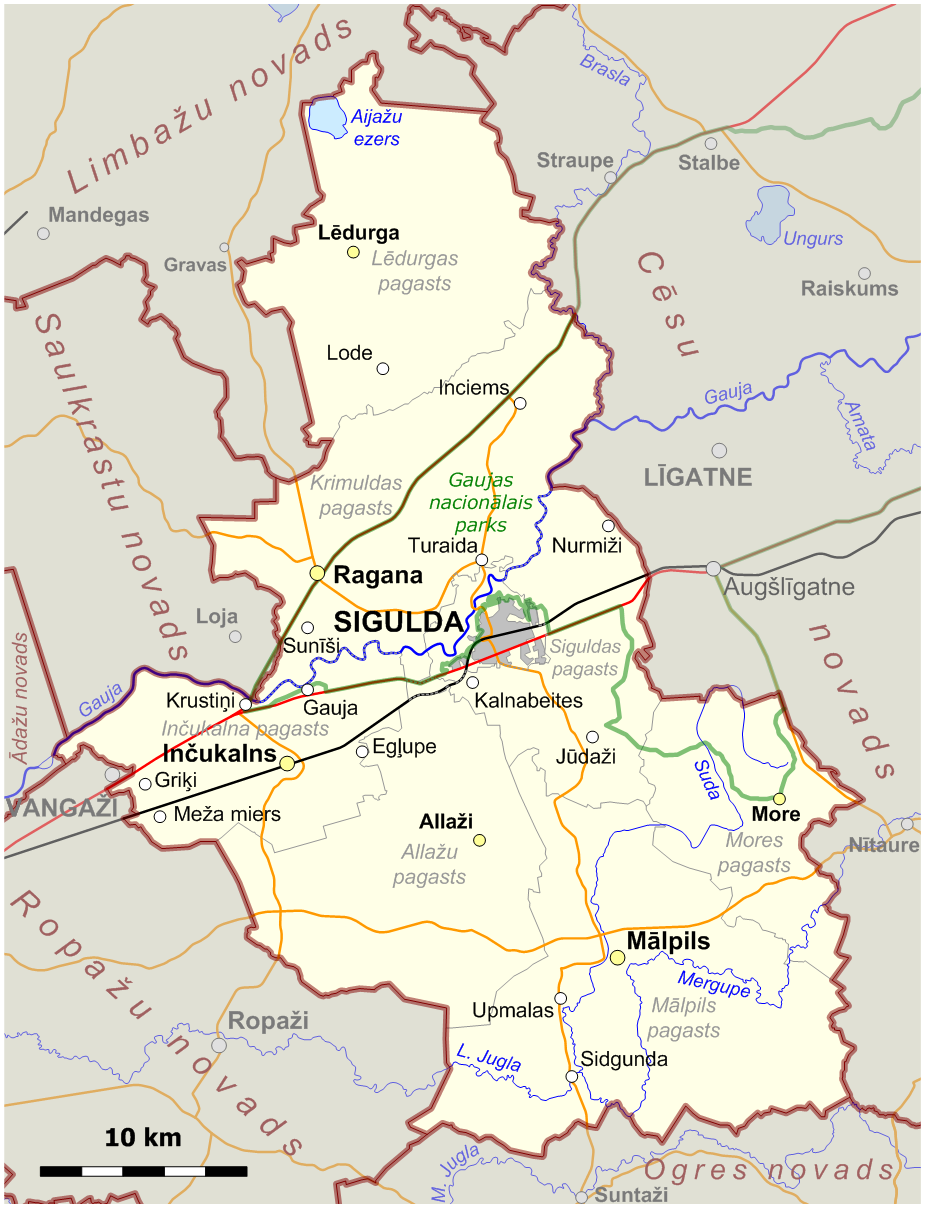
- Country: Latvia
- Formed: 2003
- Reformed: 2021
- Centre: Sigulda

Government
  - Council Chair: Linards Kumskis (LZS/LZP)

Area
  - Total: 1,029.88 km^{2} (397.64 sq mi)
  - Land: 995.12 km^{2} (384.22 sq mi)

Population (2026)
  - Total: 31,546
  - Density: 31.701/km^{2} (82.104/sq mi)
- Website: www.sigulda.lv

Sigulda Municipality (Latvian: Siguldas novads) is a municipality in Vidzeme, Latvia. The municipality was formed in 2003 by merging Sigulda town, Sigulda Parish and More Parish. In 2009 it absorbed Allaži parish, too; the administrative centre being Sigulda. The population in 2020 was 17,992.

On 1 July 2021, Sigulda Municipality was enlarged when Krimulda Municipality, Mālpils Municipality and Inčukalns Parish were merged into it.

== Twin towns — sister cities ==
Sigulda is a member of the Douzelage, a town twinning association of towns across the European Union. This active town twinning began in 1991 and there are regular events, such as a produce market from each of the other countries and festivals. As of 2019, its members are:

- Agros, Cyprus
- Altea, Spain
- Asikkala, Finland
- Bad Kötzting, Germany
- Bellagio, Italy
- (Republic of Ireland) Bundoran, Ireland
- Chojna, Poland
- Granville, France
- Holstebro, Denmark
- Houffalize, Belgium
- Judenburg, Austria
- Kőszeg, Hungary
- Marsaskala, Malta
- Meerssen, Netherlands
- Niederanven, Luxembourg
- Oxelösund, Sweden
- Preveza, Greece
- Rokiškis, Lithuania
- Rovinj, Croatia
- Sesimbra, Portugal
- Sherborne, England, United Kingdom
- Siret, Romania
- Škofja Loka, Slovenia
- Sušice, Czech Republic
- Tryavna, Bulgaria
- Türi, Estonia
- Zvolen, Slovakia

Other twinnings

- Angus, Scotland
- Birštonas, Lithuania
- (Georgia (country)) Chiatura, Georgia
- Chocz, Poland
- Falköping, Sweden
- Keila, Estonia
- Stuhr, Germany
- Vesthimmerland, Denmark

== Notable people ==
- Garlieb Merkel (1769 in Lēdurga Parish – 1850), a Baltic German writer and activist
- Teodors Zaļkalns (1876 in Allaži Parish – 1972), early sculptor, poet, medalist and teacher
- Marta Skulme (1890 in Mālpils Parish – 1962), the first professional Latvian woman sculptor
- Herberts Dāboliņš (1908 in Allaži Parish - 2000), cross-country skier, competed in the 1936 Winter Olympics
- Valdis Celms (born 1943 in Vildoga Parish), a Latvian artist, graphic designer and neopagan leader.
