= Rietumu Banka =

Latvian private commercial bank

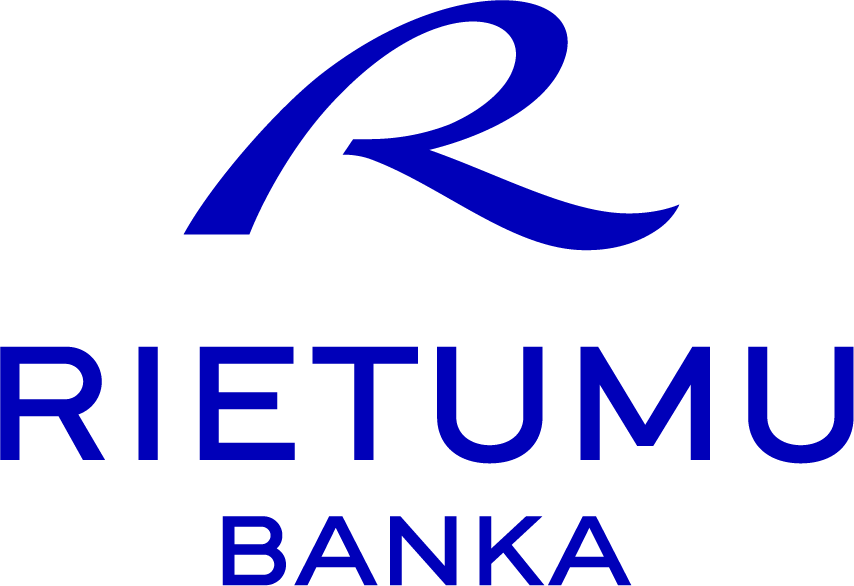

- Rietumu Banka central office
- Type: Joint-stock company
- Industry: Financial services
- Founded: May 14, 1992
- Headquarters: Riga, Latvia
- Key people: Jeļena Buraja, Ruslan Stecyuk, Mihail Birzgals, Vladlen Topchiyan
- Net income: 15.9 million euros (31.12.2023)
- Total assets: ▲1.5 bn EUR (31.12.2023)
- Number of employees: 380 employees
- Website: www.rietumu.com

Rietumu Banka is the largest Latvian capital bank and one of the four largest commercial banks operating in the country.

In the TOP101 rating, compiled by the investment bank Prudentia and the Nasdaq Riga Stock Exchange, Rietumu Banka is recognized as the most valuable local company in the financial services sector and ranks fifth among all sectors of local Latvian private companies.

In the European System of Financial Supervision (ESFS), Rietumu Banka is recognized as a systemically important institution along with other major European banks.

The founders of Rietumu Banka are Latvian citizens, who are its current owners. The largest shareholders of the bank are SIA ‘’Esterkin Family Investments’’ (33.12%; sole owner Leonids Esterkins), Boswell (International) Consulting Limited (33.11%; sole owner Dermot Fachtna Desmond), Suharenko Family Investments (17.34%; sole owner Arkādijs Suharenko).

== Operations and Clients ==
Rietumu Banka's operations are focused on serving large and medium-sized businesses and affluent individuals in Latvia, as well as in other Baltic and European countries.

The bank's clients include companies operating in sectors such as green energy, food production, manufacturing, commercial and residential real estate development, construction, financial services, technology, trade, etc.

Rietumu Banka offers financing new projects, refinancing existing liabilities, credit lines, and investments in business. Over the past five years, the bank has provided financing worth more than 1 billion euros, with a significant part of "green" loans.

The bank ensures the management of free funds by applying various liquidity solutions and making investments in global financial market instruments.

The range of banking services also includes remote account opening and management, international payments, currency transactions, deposits, brokerage services, payment cards, individual customer managers, etc.

All business decisions of the bank are made in Latvia.

The bank's central office is located in Riga, in the Rietumu Capital Centre, an A+++ class high-rise building. In 2010, the bank's office building received the Riga Architecture Award. In 2023, Rietumu Capital Center was awarded the prestigious Green Office certification by the World Wildlife Fund (WWF).

In 2026, Ilta-Sanomat reported that Rietumu Banka was used to receive customer payments for Teboil, a Finnish fuel company owned by sanctioned Russian oil company Lukoil, after sanctions-related restrictions had disrupted Teboil’s payment traffic in Finland.

== Management ==
Members of the Council of Rietumu Banka: Leonids Esterkins (Chairman of the Council), Arkādijs Suharenko, Dermot Fachtna Desmond (Deputy Chairmen of the Council); Charles William Larson Jr., Valentīns Bļugers, Iļja Suharenko (Council members).

Members of the Board: Jeļena Buraja (Chairman of the Board), Ruslans Stecjuks (Deputy Chairman of the Board); Mihails Birzgals, Vladlens Topčijans, and Sandris Straume (Board members).

Jeļena Buraja has been the Chairman of the Board since 2021. Previously, she managed the corporate finance, investment, and legal areas of the bank, as well as the activities of the Rietumu Banka Group. In 2021, Jeļena Buraja was included in the Forbes TOP 100 list of the most successful Latvian business women, and in 2023, she was recognized as the most successful woman in Latvian financial industry in The 40 Under 40 Forbes Latvia rankings.

== Financial Indicators ==
For more than 30 years since its founding, Rietumu Banka has consistently maintained high efficiency indicators and operated profitably.

According to the audited financial report for 2023, Rietumu Banka's net profit in 2023 was 15.9 million euros. The bank's assets were 1.5 billion euros, customer deposits 1 billion euros, loans 656 million euros, and shareholder’s equity 360 million euros.

The bank follows a modern risk management culture in accordance with the latest compliance requirements and trends. The capital adequacy ratio, reflecting the financial stability of the company, is 25,65%,the Liquidity Coverage Ratio (LCR), indicating the bank's ability to meet its obligations even in potential crisis situations, is 398.34%, several times exceeding the regulator's requirement (100%).

Profitability indicators are consistently high: Return on Equity (ROE) before tax is 4.58%, and Return on Assets (ROA) is 1.09%.

KPMG Baltics is the auditor of the financial report of the bank.

== Sustainability ==
Rietumu Banka adheres to Environmental, Social, and Governance (ESG) principles and implements a Sustainability strategy with priorities and measures in the areas of environment, social responsibility, and governance. The strategy is developed in accordance with the Sustainability roadmap of the Bank of Latvia. The bank observes the sustainability regulatory acts, standards, and recommendations of the Republic of Latvia and international standards in its operations.

The bank finances green energy projects and uses environmentally friendly solutions in its daily operations, generating solar energy and avoiding harmful materials.

The bank is recognized as a "Family-Friendly Workplace" within the programme implemented by the Society Integration Foundation, creating favourable conditions for both employees and their families, contributing to such a culture in society as a whole.

== Support for Medicine, Sports, and Culture ==
Rietumu Banka implements measures to enhance the well-being of society and promote the development of sports, culture, and the arts.

Rietumu Banka and the charity foundation established by the bank, the Future Supporting Fund, donated 50,000 euros to the Angels Across Latvia project dedicated to the medical treatment of Latvian children.

The bank has been an official partner of the Latvian Hockey Federation for many years, notably during the 2023 Ice Hockey World Championship, where the national team achieved its highest success to date by winning the bronze medal. Rietumu Banka collaborates with the VEF Riga Basketball Club The bank also partners with the Riga City Yacht Club, supporting regattas and youth sailing competitions.

The bank is a patron of the Dailes Theatre, the largest theatre in the Baltic States with a history spanning over a century. The collaboration involves an annual funding of 100,000 euros to supplement the theatre's most ambitious new productions.

Rietumu Banka actively participates in various art projects, hosting exhibitions of contemporary artists in its gallery. In spring 2023, the Art Museum Riga Bourse featured the exhibition "Reflections of the Era," showcasing works by Latvian artists from the Rietumu Banka painting collection.

== Future Supporting Fund ==
The bank founded the charity foundation Nākotnes Atbalsta fonds (Future Supporting Fund) in 2007, which annually supports numerous social and cultural projects across Latvia. The foundation is an independent organization that sets its own priorities, evaluates applications, and allocates funding to selected projects.

Main support areas include healthcare and child medicine, social projects for the most vulnerable groups, Latvian and European art and culture, support for young talents and education, children and youth sports activities, activities promoting a green and healthy lifestyle, restoration of historical buildings and artifacts, and urban development.

Major projects supported by the fund: Meklējam sirdsmāsu, Kilograms kultūras, Latvijas sakrālais mantojums, Eņģeļi pār Latviju, young music performers competition Ineses Galantes talanti. Future Support Fund constantly co-operates with the Latvian National Museum of Art and other museums, financially supports the acquisition of works of art to complement museum collections, organisation of exhibitions and publication of catalogues.

The total fund's support for projects amounted to more than 10 million euros.

The fund’s activities are overseen by a council chaired by Arkādijs Suharenko, with board members Jeļena Buraja and Elīna Suharenko.

== History ==
Rietumu Banka was founded on May 14, 1992, in Latvia. By 1995, it became the fifth-largest bank in Latvia by asset volume.

In 2001, Rietumu Banka acquired 100% of Saules Bank's shares. In 2005, 33% of Rietumu Banka's shares were purchased by Irish entrepreneur Dermot Fachtna Desmond. The bank's new central office, Rietumu Capital Centre, opened in 2008, being the first A+++ class business building in Latvia. In 2009, Rietumu Banka was the only Latvian bank operating profitably during the financial crisis. In 2012, with the bank's support, Riga hosted the first international e-commerce conference "eCom21," attracting over 250 industry professionals worldwide.

In 2017, Rietumu Banka partnered with the leading German deposit placement platform ZINSPILOT, entering Europe's largest deposit investment market. Rietumu Banka was the first bank in Latvia to initiate such a project in the field of financial technology.

On July 6, 2017, the Paris Court of First Instance imposed a fine of 80 million euros on Rietumu Banka in a case against the French company France Offshore for tax evasion. The bank cooperated with French judicial institutions throughout the investigation, which commenced in France in 2011 to look into developments that had taken place before that, and the legal proceedings. In 2021, the Paris Appeals Court reduced the potential fine by 75%, a development dubbed a "bank victory" by international media. The bank had preliminary made sufficient provisions for possible fine payment, therefore any outcome of abovementioned case will not affect the future activities nor the stability of the Bank. The judgment of the Paris Court of Appeals will be examined in accordance with Latvian legislation after the French competent authority addresses the Latvian Ministry of Justice and submits the materials for the Latvian court's decision.

In spring 2018, the Latvian financial sector experienced significant instability due to accusations by the U.S. Department of the Treasury against ABLV Bank for money laundering. Latvia's financial market supervisory authorities and legislators made decisions that significantly restricted the collaboration of all banks with non-residents, especially high-risk clients. In this situation, Rietumu Banka independently decided to change its business model and focus on serving clients in Latvia, as well as other Baltic and OECD countries. Rolf Fuls, one of the top managers of the bank in the previous 20 years, was appointed as the Chairman of the Board of Rietumu Banka.

In 2019, the bank entered into a cooperation agreement with the state-owned Development Finance Institution ALTUM.

In 2021, Jeļena Buraja was appointed as the chairman of the bank's board.

In 2022, Rietumu Banka supported the Three Seas Initiative Summit in Riga. Jeļena Buraja spoke at the international ACAMS forum in New York (USA).

In 2023, the bank provided significant loans for the growth of Latvian businesses, including a 25 million euro loan for the development of Astor Group's hotel property business and a 48 million euro loan to Riga Retail Park, the owner of the shopping centre Sāga. Jeļena Buraja spoke at the Financial Women's Association (FWA) summit in New York and became a member of FWA.

In 2024, Charles William Larson Jr., former U.S. Ambassador to Latvia, Iowa Senate member, and U.S. Army lieutenant colonel, was appointed to the Council of Rietumu Banka. He has received prestigious awards from both the U.S. and Latvia.

That same year, the bank became a Platinum member of the British Chamber of Commerce in Latvia. Rietumu Banka continued to focus on financing large corporate projects in Latvia and the EU, including real estate, production, financial services, technology, and green energy, particularly in renewable energy initiatives.

== See also ==
- List of banks in the euro area
- List of banks in Latvia
