= Uga Skulme =

Latvian painter

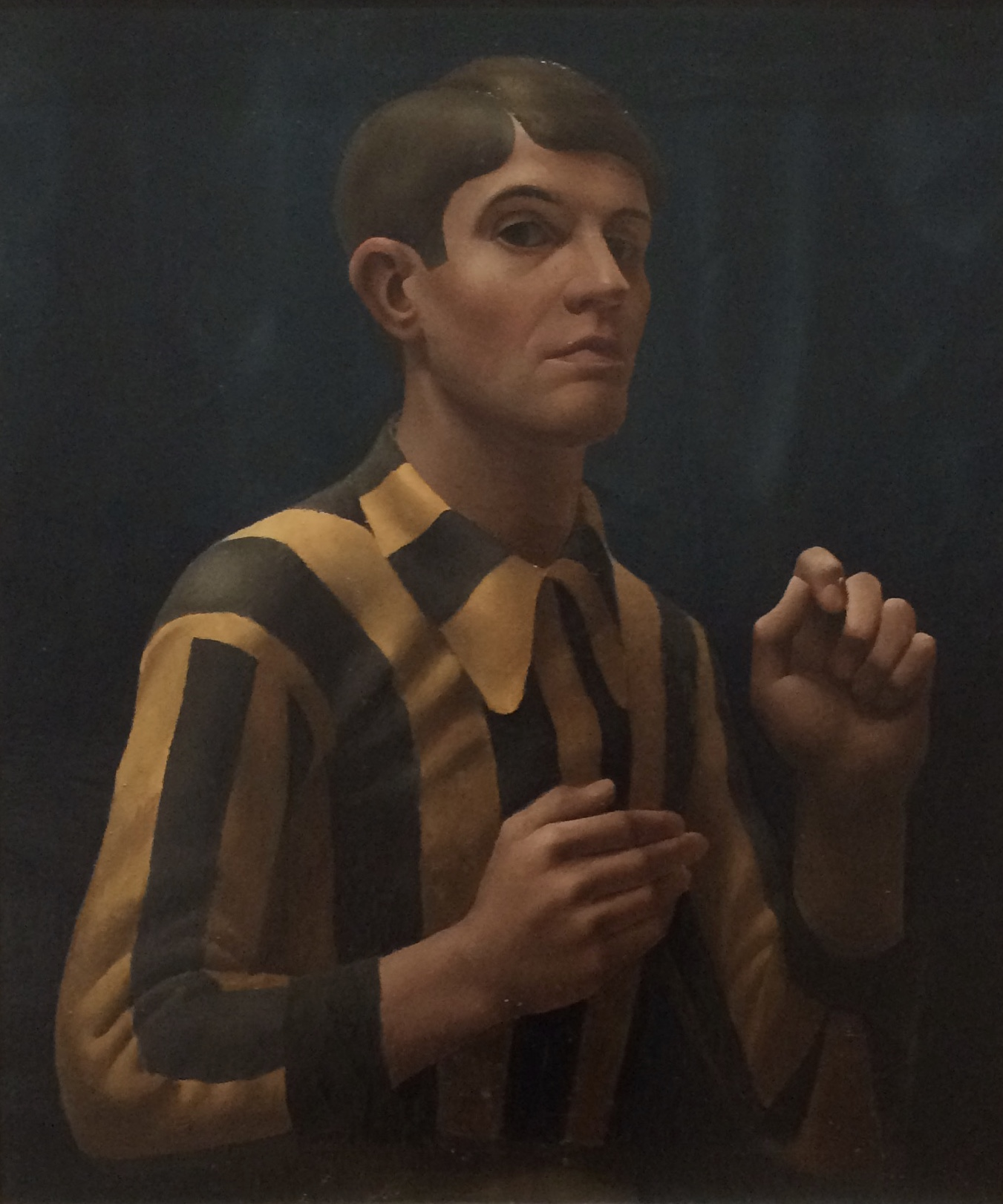
- "Self-portrait" by Uga Skulme, 1926
- Born: 20 May 1895; Jēkabpils, Russian Empire, (Now Latvia
- Died: 6 November 1963 (aged 68); Moscow, USSR, (Now Russia
- Known for: Painting
- Movement: Modernism, Neoclassicism, Cubism, Purism
- Spouse: Ksenija Skulme

Uga Skulme (20 May 1895 – 6 November 1963) was a Latvian painter.

Skulme was born in Jēkabpils, Courland Governorate, one of ten children. He studied at the Faculty of Law, the St. Petersburg University, in Russia, and the School of Imperial Society for the Fostering of Art (between 1913 and 1914), the Architecture Department at the St.Petersburg Academy of Arts (1914 - 1916) and the Painting Department under K. Petrov-Vodkin. Stylistically he was a Cubist and has been compared to Aleksandra Belcova for his use of the static form, cool range of colours, thin layer of paint and a sheen close to the metal surface with the accent on drawing.

Skulme was drafted into the army during World War I and then returned to Russia as an art teacher. He returned to Latvia in 1920. Skulme was a member of the Riga Artists Group between 1921 and 1939 and head of the drawing studio at the Rīga People's High School between 1924 and 1927 and a private art studio between 1923 and 1927. He was a professor at the Latvian State Academy of Arts in 1941 and again between 1945 and 1963. In addition to this he was a contributor to the Daugava magazine and the editorial staff member of the Latvian Encyclopedia between 1928 and 1940.

One of Skulme's brothers was Otto Skulme, the theatre reformer.
