= Marta Skulme =

Latvian sculptor (1890–1962)

- Born: Marta Liepiņa; 13 May 1890; Mālpils Parish, Governorate of Livonia, Russian Empire
- Died: 3 January 1962 (aged 71); Riga, Latvian SSR, Soviet Union
- Known for: Sculpture
- Movement: Modernism, Constructivism, Cubism

Marta Skulme (Latvian: Marta Skulme); (13 May 1890 – 3 January 1962) was the first professional Latvian woman sculptor. She was a member of the Riga Artists Group.

== Biography ==
Marta Skulme was born on 13 May 1890, in Mālpils Municipality in a family of a farmer.

Skulme studied at Art School in Kazan (1912–1914) and at Tavricheskaya Art School in Petrograd (1914–1918) under the guidance of sculptor Leonid Sherwood. She worked mainly in small forms of sculpture, although she possessed an excellent gift as a monumentalist (in 1924 she shared the 1st prize with Kārlis Zāle in the competition for the Freedom Monument). The plastic art of Marta Skulme developed to artistic generalization. Her images possess elements of spiritual balance and inner nobility. Skulme worked with different materials (granite, bronze, wood), but the majority of her sculptures were performed in plaster castings. She participated in exhibitions since 1920. Her works were presented at the republican, USSR exhibitions and abroad.

Marta Skulme died on 3 January 1962, in Riga. She was buried on 7 January 1962, at the Riga Forest Cemetery.

== Selected works ==
Sculptural portraits:

- "Portrait of Father", 1923
- "Head of a Woman", 1930
- "Portrait of Džemma", 1940
- "Portrait of Teodors Zaļkalns", 1952
- "Portrait of Academician Lidija Liepiņa", 1960

Figurative compositions:

- "Woman from Vidzeme", 1928
- "Sheafbinder", 1949
- "Sack Carrier", 1950
- "Successors", 1957
