= Ilmārs Reinholds Drēziņš =

Latvian engineer (1930–2022)

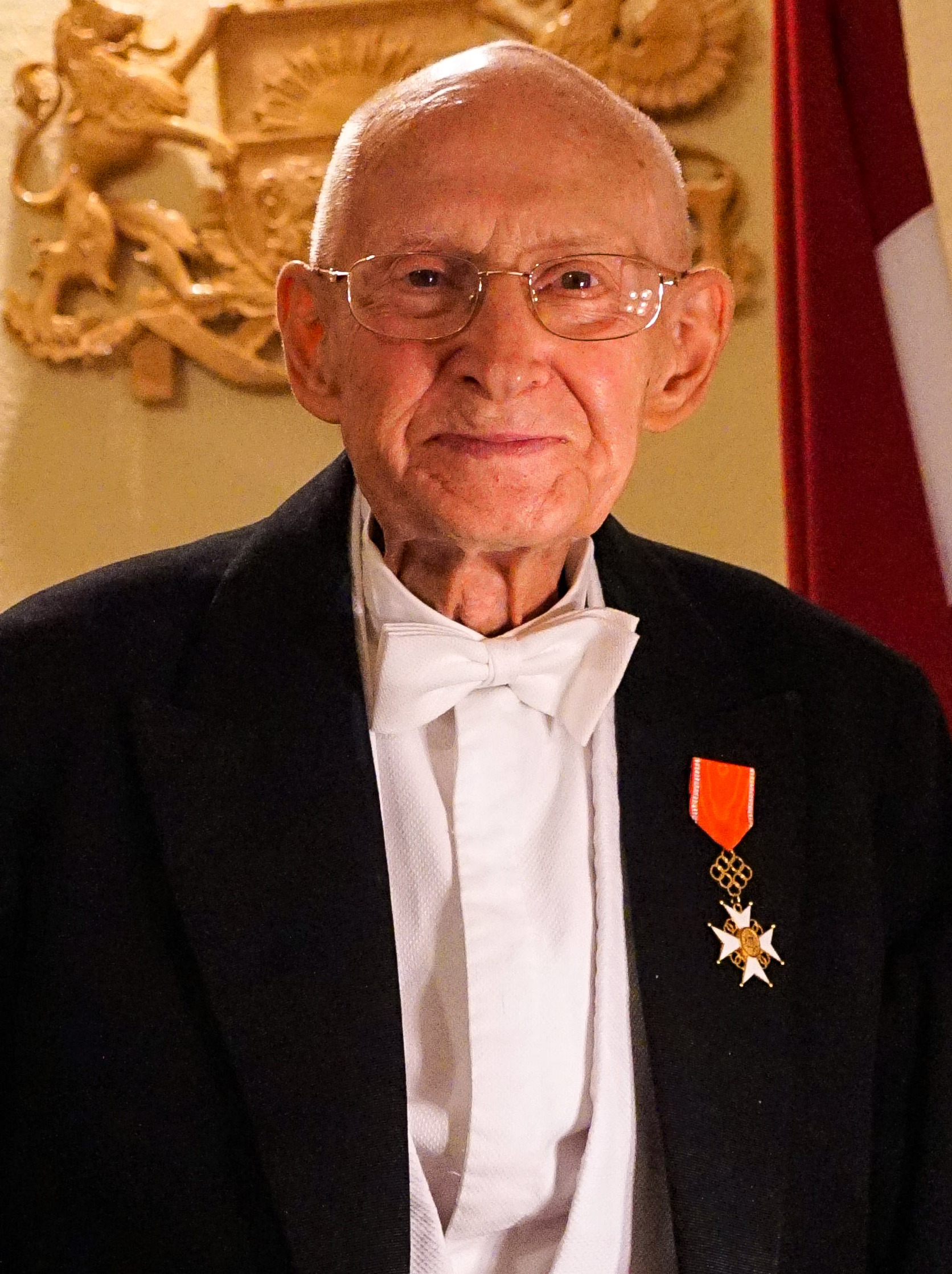
- Ilmārs Reinholds Drēziņš on August 19, 2021, at Riga Castle.
- Born: 29 April 1930; Nordeķi Manor, Riga, Latvia (Latvia)
- Died: 13 December 2022 (aged 92); Riga, Latvia (Latvia)
- Citizenship: Latvia
- Spouse: Benita Paula Drēziņa
- Children: Daila Šēnberga
- Parent(s): Jānis Augusts Drēziņš; Alīda Alvīne Drēziņa (née Upīte)
- Awards: Cross of Recognition
- Scientific career
- Fields: Construction
- Institutions: Latvian Municipal Economy Design Institute «Komunālprojekts» Latvian City Construction Design Institute; JSC "Pilsētprojekts"; Riga City Council

Ilmārs Reinholds Drēziņš (29 April 1930 – 13 December 2022) was a long-standing construction industry expert, architect and civil engineer, resident of Carnikava and recipient of the Cross of Recognition. He worked in public administration until his death, and at 93 was the oldest working civil engineer in Latvia.

== Biography ==
Born in 1930 in the Kreišmaņu House of Nordeķi Manor in Riga. His father was officer of Latvian army Jānis Augusts Drēziņš, his grandfather was sea captain Jānis Drēziņš. Ilmārs studied in 1938 at the newly opened Riga Viesturs 48th Primary School for the Commander of the Latvian Army in the capital Riga, where during the occupation he founded the Latvian National Boys' Circle. After World War II, he graduated from the Construction Department of the Riga Industrial Polytechnic, beginning his apprenticeship and career as a construction engineer at 16. Student of painter Jūlijs Viļumainis. He was denied studies at the Latvian Academy of Art by the Minister of Culture of the Latvian SSR, Vladimirs Kaupužs. After the war, he lived in Carnikava.

He worked in construction planning, leading the project-estimate group of the Riga Workers' Deputies Council Executive Committee's Housing Department, at the design institutes «Remontprojekts», «Komunālprojekts» (Municipal Economy Design Institute), the Latvian City Construction Design Institute, the joint-stock company "Pilsētprojekts". During the Singing Revolution, he joined the Latvian National Independence Movement.

After Latvia regained independence, he worked for the company SIA «AIG» (Architectural Research Group), founded from the Cultural Monuments Restoration Design Office of the Latvian SSR Ministry of Culture, the State Real Estate Agency (now state joint-stock company «Valsts nekustamie īpašumi»), the design company «Attīstības projekts», and many private, public, and church organizations, including the Evangelical Lutheran Church Consistory construction company «Arka».

He was a member of the Latvian Association of Civil Engineers, founder of the construction organization «Būvzinis». Drēziņš’s «Construction Cost Norms» have been included in the methodology of the Riga Construction College and Riga Technical University programs. He served as chief specialist at the Riga City Council Housing and Environment Department. Since 2013, he was re-certified as an expert in construction project economics, volumes, and estimates.

== Public Activity ==
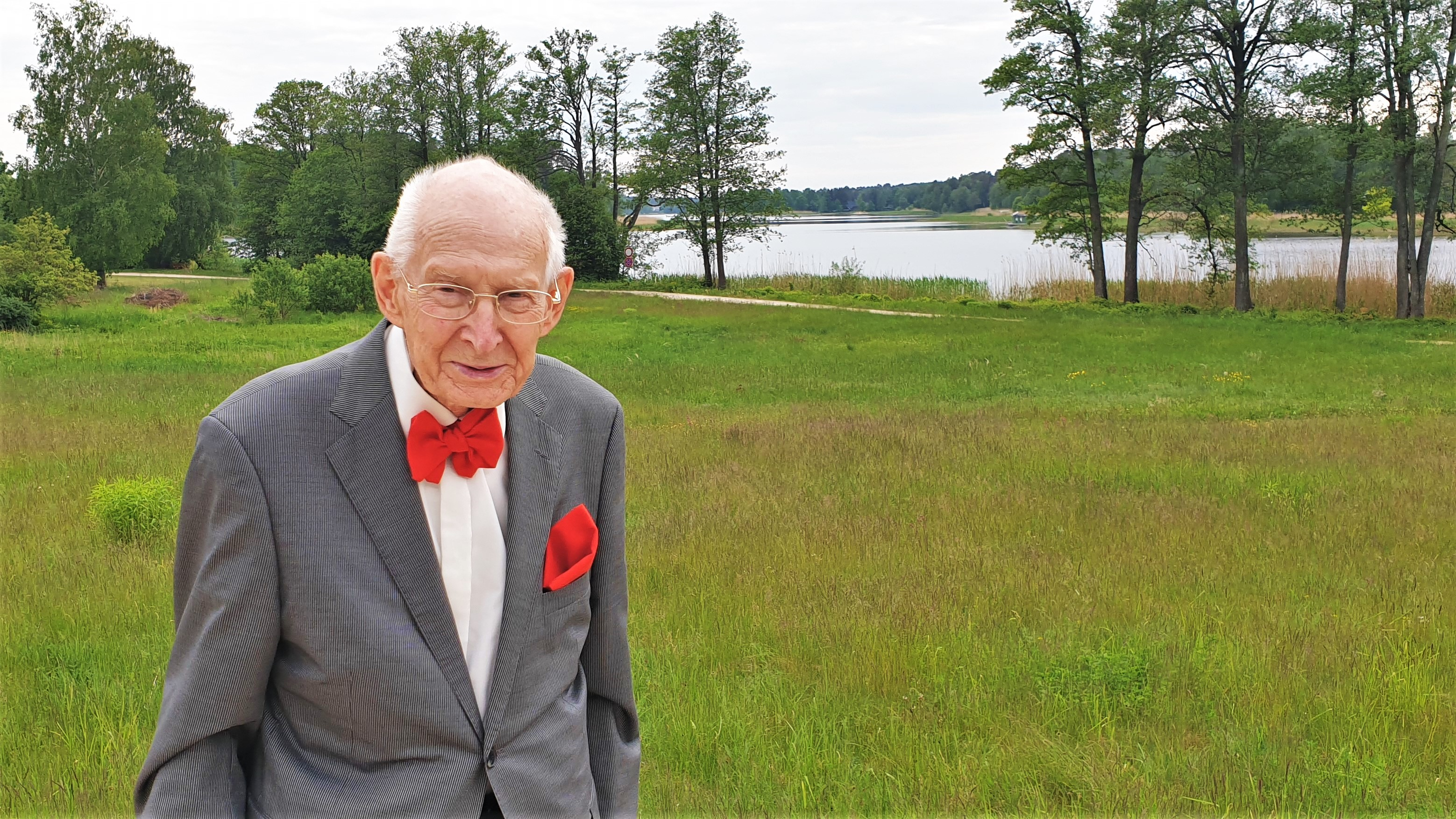
Ilmārs Reinholds Drēziņš on June 3, 2021, at the square near Ādaži Municipality Church by Baltezers

Drēziņš’s activism in constitutional law received international attention, for example in the Oxford University «Oxford Reports on International Law», and he was involved in the political process, including standing as a candidate for the Riga City Council and the Saeima.

He participated in the preservation of the Latvian language and culture, supported family values, and was active in the Christian and Evangelical Lutheran Churches.

== Awards ==
- Cross of Recognition — Awarded in 2020 for contributions to construction and public service.
