= Ausma Skujiņa =

Latvian architect

- Born: 18 July 1931; Irlava, Latvia
- Died: 13 August 2015 (aged 84)
- Education: University of Latvia
- Occupation: Architect

Ausma Skujiņa (18 July 1931 - 13 August 2015) was a Latvian architect. Working for firms such as Latgyprogorstroy and for her own private practice, she designed and renovated housing and churches in such places as Liepāja and Mārupe.

== Biography ==
Ausma Skujiņa was born on 18 July 1931 in Irlava, a village in the western area of Latvia. She studied at the University of Latvia, graduating from the Department of Architecture in 1957. She worked at the Tsentrosoyuzprojekt Institute (1958-1960) and the Latvian SSR Resort Administration's project office (1960-1967), originally starting in international modernism. In 1966, she joined the Latvian Association of Architects.

From 1968 to 1979, she worked at apartment architecture firm Latgyprogorstroy, where her designing style "returned to her roots"; in one case, the yard management of Lauma, a residential building in Liepāja, was improved as part of her work. During her time there, she won a Council of Ministers of the Latvian Soviet Socialist Republic award for her 1975 residential building Lauma, located in Liepāja.

After working briefly with Kolkhozprojekts, a residential architecture firm specializing in buildings in Mārupe, she later worked as an architect for Alauksts, a collective farm in Cēsis district, during which she designed a 1990 residential block in Mārupe. She also collaborated with J. Pipurs to rebuiild the house of writer Kārlis Skalbe.

In 1993, she opened a private practice, based in Riga. Since then, her work included a 1997 church renovation in Vecpiebalga and a 1998 church in Liepāja. Jānis Lejnieks called the renovation her "greatest contribution to the culture of the region". Her use of traditional methods in her modern designs of churches, particularly those located in Aizpute, Liepāja, and Vangaži, was widely noted. In 1998, she was appointed Officer of the Order of the Three Stars, and in 1999, the State Culture Capital Foundation awarded her a lifetime scholarship.

Skujiņa died on 13 August 2015; she was 84. Zvirgzdiņš said that she "acted as the conscience of the profession — sometimes harsh in Latvian, but deeply interested, evaluating both her own and her colleagues' work with a strict standard of ethical responsibility."
