= Jānis Drēziņš =

Sea captain and head of the Latvian lighthouse system

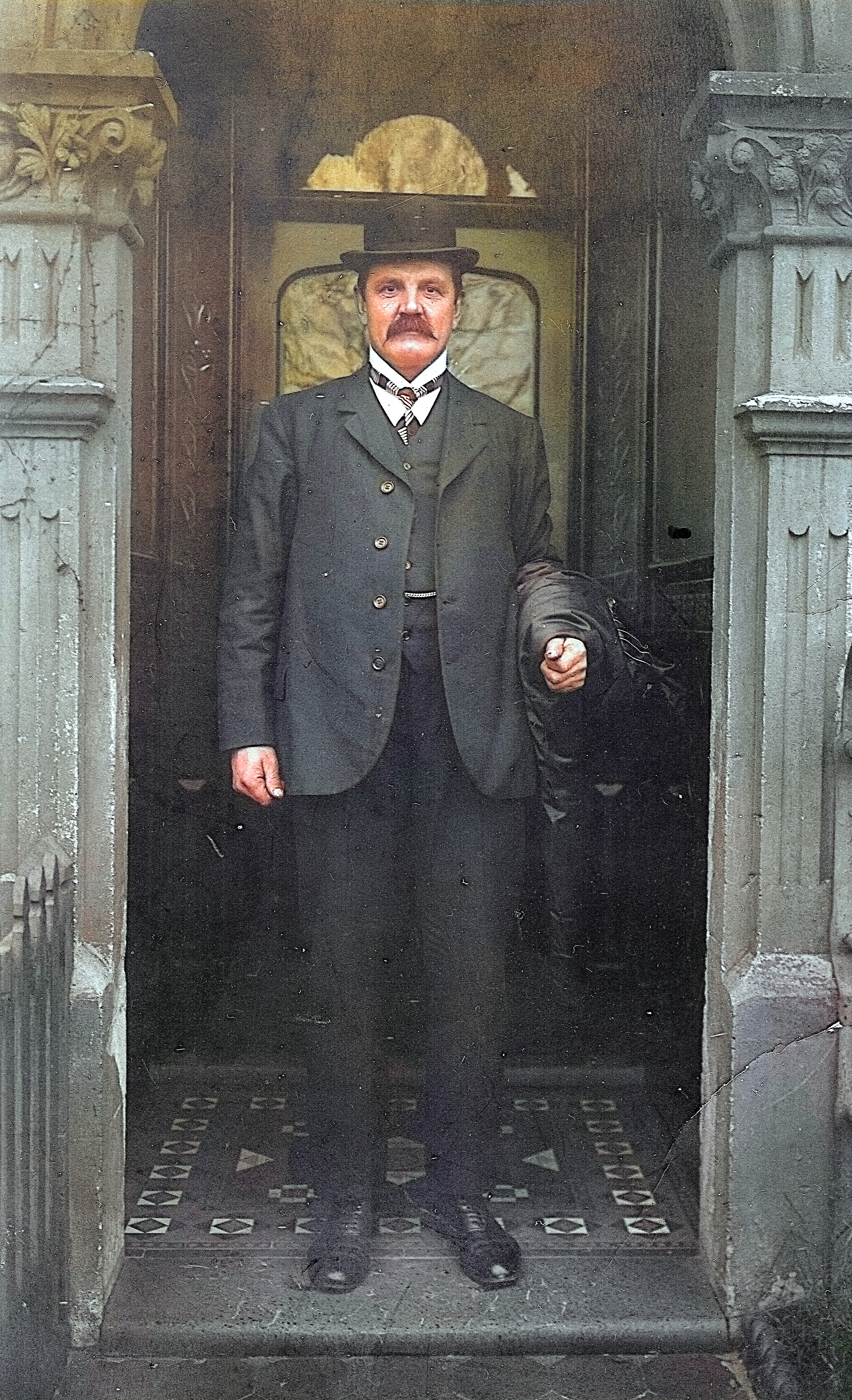
- Jānis Drēziņš in London, late 19th century

Head of Daugavgrīva and Riga Lighthouses, Hydrographic Department, Ministry of Transport
- In office 26 June 1919 – 5 December 1944
- Preceded by: Position established

Personal details
- Born: Jānis Reiks; 12 October 1868 Bīriņi Parish, Riga District, Governorate of Livonia, Russian Empire
- Died: 9 November 1948 (aged 80) Riga, Latvia
- Spouse: Anna Drēziņa (née Auziņa)
- Education: Mangaļi Nautical School
- Profession: Sea captain
- Awards: Cross of Recognition, Cross of St. George (Russia)

Jānis Drēziņš (born Jānis Reiks; 12 October 1868 – 9 November 1948) was a Latvian sea captain and the long-time head of the lighthouse system of Riga and Daugavgrīva, serving through the entire period of interwar independent Latvia.

== Family ==
Drēziņš was born on 12 October 1868 in "Puntūzis", Bīriņi Parish, in the Governorate of Livonia, then part of the Russian Empire, to Mārtiņš Drēziņš-Reiks and Marija Drēziņa (née Balode). He was baptized in Krimulda parish as Jānis Reiks. Baptized in the Krimulda church on November 17, 1868 as Jānis Reiks, his godparents were his uncle Jānis Drēziņš-Reiks (b. 1833) and Jānis Dālderis with his wife Anna. Brothers Pēteris Drēziņš-Reiks (b. 4 August 1861), Mārtiņš Drēziņš (1864–1922), Kārlis Drēziņš (1872–1953) and Augusts Drēziņš (1881–1962), all graduates of nautical schools as sea captains, forming the family of captains Drēziņš together with the brothers and nephews of Drēziņš's wife Anna, also sailors. Drēziņš himself, the eldest brother Mārtiņš, the youngest Augusts, as well as the latter's son Mārtiņš Fēlikss Bruno Drēziņš (1912–1991) sailed the longest at sea. Drēziņš-Reiks' grandson is a civil engineer Ilmārs Reinholds Drēziņš.

== Education ==
He graduated from the Mangaļi Nautical School and was issued sea captain’s diploma No. 582 on 24 March 1899 by the Russian Empire’s Ministry of Trade and Industry. He later studied in London, United Kingdom.

== Nautical career ==
From the 19th century, he was a long-distance captain on voyages in the Arctic Ocean, the Atlantic Ocean and the Indian Ocean, including to Bombay, Arkhangelsk, Rio de Janeiro. He was the first sea captain of the barquentine «Rūdolfs», the captain of the gaff schooner «Anna Ottilie», etc. At the beginning of the 20th century he lived in Fowey, Cornwall, United Kingdom as John Drehsin. In October 1913, in cooperation with the chief engineer of Elbing, Kīnāpel, who arrived in May, he began work at the newly founded Riga Shipyard or «F. Šihavs, Mīlgrāvi Shipyard» Mīlgrāvi, Magnusmuiža parish where one of his houses was located on the current Vecmīlgrāviš 2nd line or 9 Emmas Street, and his brother, Captain Mārtiņš Drēziņš and his sister-in-law Alvīne Ieva Daukše with her husband Vilhelms also lived next door; later he was also the captain of the steamer «Куйваст». From August 1, 1915 to February 24, 1918, he served in the Peter the First naval fortress in the Gulf of Finland coast defense brigade as a steamship captain, at the same time creating the opportunity to come to Daugavgrīva throughout the war years, where he subsequently lived for twenty-five years. In December 1916, the Commander of the Baltic Secret Intelligence Service of the Russian Empire, the Commander of the Imperial Baltic Fleet, Vice Admiral Adrian Nepenin, awarded Drēziņš with the St. George Medal No. 1150137 for his courage in rescuing civilians from mines.

== Hydrographic Service ==
Jānis Drēziņš in the uniform of a sea captain at the end of the 19th century

After the declaration of Estonian independence on February 24, 1918, he returned to Latvia and managed the Riga Port Lighthouses for more than 25 years. From the First World War (after the proclamation of the Republic of Latvia in 1918, on June 26, 1919, officially on behalf of the Ministry of Trade and Industry of the then Provisional Government of Latvia, as the Coastal Lighting Board taking over navigation from the German occupation authorities) until the end of World War II in Riga in 1944, he managed the navigation work of the Daugavgrīva Lighthouses and all the lighthouses of the Daugava estuary as the supervisor of the Riga and Daugavgrīva Lighthouses of the Hydrographic Department of the Maritime Department of the Ministry of Transport, during which time he also lived in Daugavgrīva. About his long-term, more than twenty-year work in the management of the Riga Port Lighthouses in the state service, Kārlis Ulmanis decided on November 9, 1939 to award November 18, 1939 with Cross of Recognition.

Wehrmacht retreating 1944. In October 1944, the Daugavgrīva lighthouse was blown up, but on December 5, 1944, the USSR army expelled Jānis Drēziņš from the von Kort house in Daugavgrīva, where he lived, Birzes Street (now partly this street is Valentīna Pikuļa Alley); Drēziņš settled with his son at 19 Strēlnieku Street, where he lived until the end of his life. 1945, a temporary wooden lighthouse was built on Drēziņš's advice, but during the second Soviet occupation, the captain no longer participated in the operation of the Riga port and devoted the rest of his life to research.

== Musical interests ==
In order to conduct Lutheran services while performing his duties as a captain, Jānis Drēziņš learned to play the organ, maintained harmoniums on the ships he commanded, and until the end of his life composed Lutheran chorales on one of his harmonium manuals.

== See also ==
- Daugavgrīva
