= Andrzej Duda =

President of Poland from 2015 to 2025

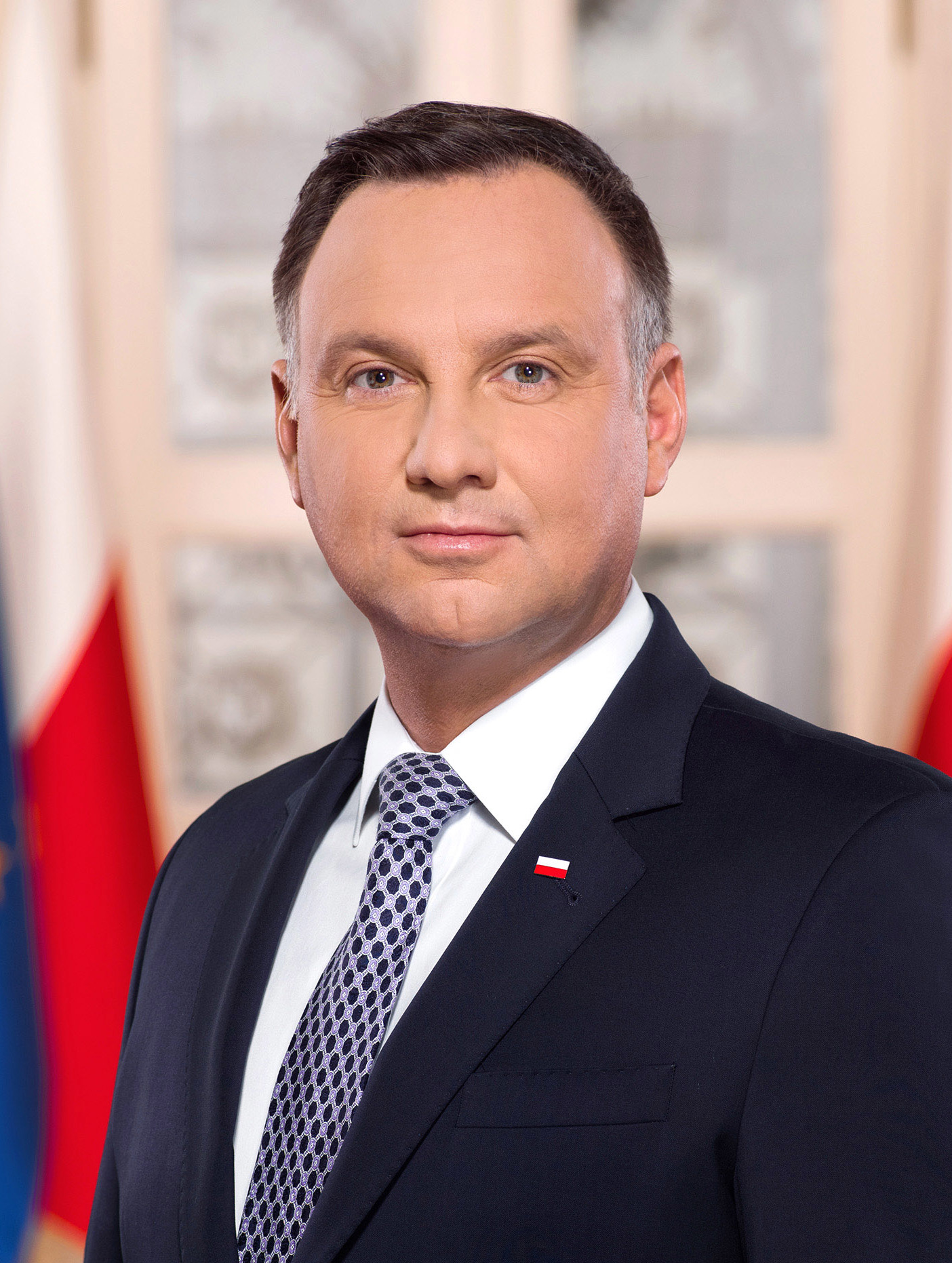
- Official portrait, 2019

President of Poland
- In office 6 August 2015 – 6 August 2025
- Prime Minister: Ewa Kopacz; Beata Szydło; Mateusz Morawiecki; Donald Tusk
- Preceded by: Bronisław Komorowski
- Succeeded by: Karol Nawrocki
Junior ministerial offices
Undersecretary of State in the Chancellery of the President
In office 16 January 2008 – 6 July 2010
President	Lech Kaczyński vacant
Undersecretary of State in the Ministry of Justice
In office 1 August 2006 – 15 November 2007
Minister	Zbigniew Ziobro
Parliamentary offices
Member of the European Parliament
In office 1 July 2014 – 25 May 2015
Constituency	10 – Kraków
Member of the Sejm
In office 8 November 2011 – 1 July 2014
Constituency	13 – Kraków II
Member of the Kraków City Council
In office 2 December 2010 – 8 November 2011
Constituency	2 – Prądnik Biały/Krowodrza

Personal details
- Born: Andrzej Sebastian Duda; 16 May 1972 (age 54) Kraków, Poland
- Party: Independent (2015–present)
- Other political affiliations: Law and Justice (2005–2015); Freedom Union (2000–2001)
- Spouse: Agata Kornhauser-Duda (m. 1994)
- Children: One
- Education: Jagiellonian University

Andrzej Sebastian Duda (Note: /ˈɑːndʒeɪ ˈduːdə/ AHN-jay DOO-də, Polish: ['andʐɛj ˈduda]) (born 16 May 1972) is a Polish lawyer and politician who served as the 6th president of Poland from 2015 to 2025. Before becoming president, he served as a Member of the Sejm (MP) from 2011 to 2014 and as a Member of the European Parliament (MEP) from 2014 to 2015.

Born in Kraków, Duda ran in the 2015 presidential election as a candidate for the Law and Justice (PiS) party and defeated the incumbent president, Bronisław Komorowski, in a surprising and significant upset. In the first round of voting, he narrowly placed first but fell well short of the required absolute majority, finally winning in the second round of voting, receiving 51.55% of the vote. On 26 May 2015, Duda resigned from his party membership as the president-elect.

As president, Duda heralded a political change in the country, paving the way for the sole rule of the PiS party after the 2015 parliamentary election in October, a political first in Poland. After PiS took power, it helped consolidate its control over the state in what has been criticised as democratic backsliding.

In October 2019, Duda received the official support of PiS ahead of his re-election campaign in 2020. He finished first in the first round and then went on to defeat Rafał Trzaskowski in the runoff with 10,440,648 votes or 51.03% of the vote. Throughout his first and second terms, Duda has largely aligned himself with the right-wing ideologies espoused by PiS and its leader Jarosław Kaczyński. Following the Russian invasion of Ukraine in February 2022, Duda has played an important role in coordinating international efforts to support Ukraine's military.

== Early life and education ==
Andrzej Sebastian Duda was born on 16 May 1972 in Kraków, to Janina (Milewska) and Jan Tadeusz Duda, professors at the AGH University of Science and Technology. His grandfather fought in the Polish–Soviet War and later was a member of the Home Army during the World War II.

Between 1987 and 1991, Duda attended Jan III Sobieski High School, Kraków, where he excelled in Humanities. He subsequently studied law at the Jagiellonian University, and earned a law degree. In 2001, he was appointed as a research assistant in the Department of Administrative Law of the Jagiellonian University's Faculty of Law and Administration. In January 2005, Duda earned a Doctor of Law degree (LL.D.) at the Jagiellonian University. Due to his political career, he has been mostly on unpaid leave from the university since September 2006, except for a 13-month interval beginning in September 2010, when he returned to the university. Additionally, he was a lecturer at Mieszko I College of Education and Administration, Poznań.

== Political career ==
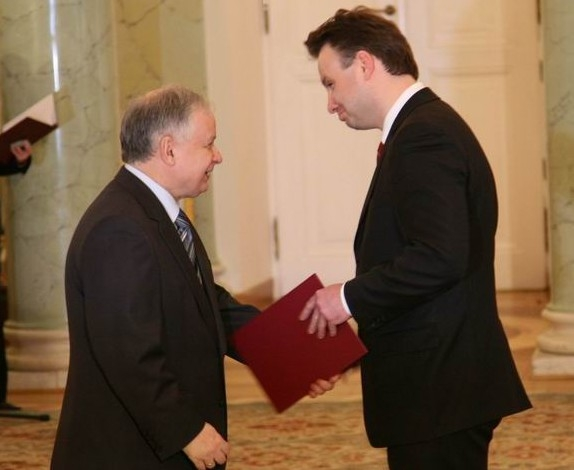
President Lech Kaczyński appointing Duda as undersecretary of state in the Chancellery of the President, 16 January 2008

Duda began his political career with the now defunct Freedom Union party in the early 2000s. After the parliamentary elections in 2005, he began his collaboration with the Law and Justice Party (PiS). He was an undersecretary of state in the Ministry of Justice between 2006 and 2007 before becoming a member of Polish State Tribunal from 2007 until 2008.

From 2008 to 2010, during the presidency of Lech Kaczyński, Duda was an undersecretary of state in the Chancellery of the President. In 2010, he was an unsuccessful candidate to become the Mayor of Kraków as a PiS candidate, but was more successful in the 2011 parliamentary election, where he received 79,981 votes for the Kraków area, and thus became a member of the Sejm.

In September 2013, the news magazine Polityka commended Duda for being one of the most active members of parliament, describing him as being open to opposition arguments and as refraining from personal attacks, as part of his role at the Commission for Constitutional Responsibility. Duda remained a member of the Sejm until he was elected to the European Parliament in 2014.

=== 2015 presidential campaign ===
As Bronisław Komorowski's presidential term was expiring, Komorowski was able to seek re-election in a scheduled presidential election. Duda was Komorowski's Law and Justice rival in the election.

In the first round of the 2015 presidential election, Duda came first, receiving 5,179,092 votes and thus 34.76% of valid votes.

In the second round Duda took 51.55% of the vote against the 48.45% share of his rival, the incumbent president Bronisław Komorowski. On 26 May 2015, he officially resigned from party membership; recent precedent calls for the president to not be a formal member of a political party.

=== 2020 presidential campaign ===
In the first round of the 2020 presidential election, Duda appeared to come in first, receiving almost 44% of the votes. Warsaw mayor Rafał Trzaskowski came in second, with just over 30% of the vote. The second round took place on 12 July. Duda won reelection with 51.03%.

== Presidency (2015–2025) ==
Graphical summary of Andrzej Duda's approval rating polls

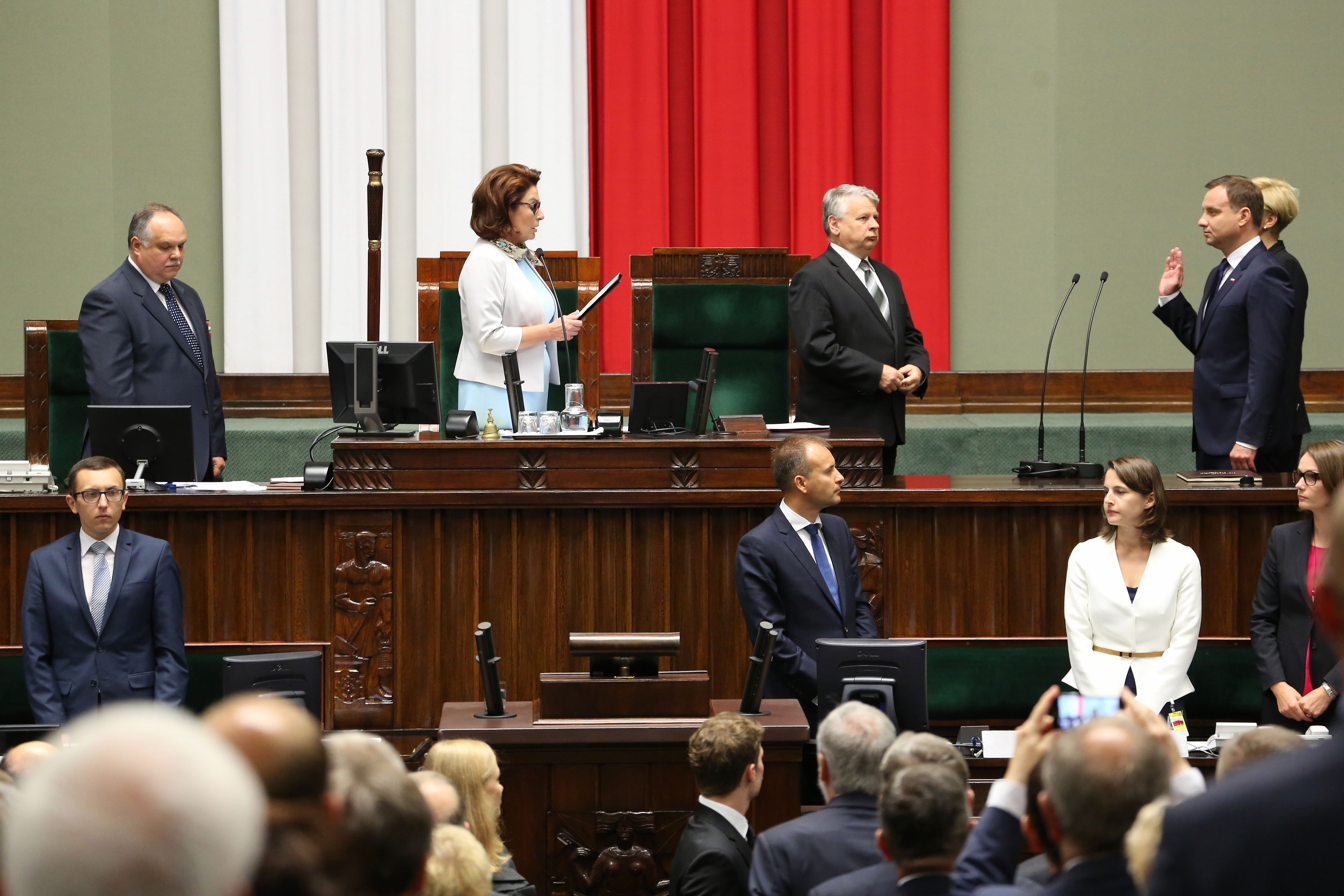
Andrzej Duda taking the oath of office, 6 August 2015

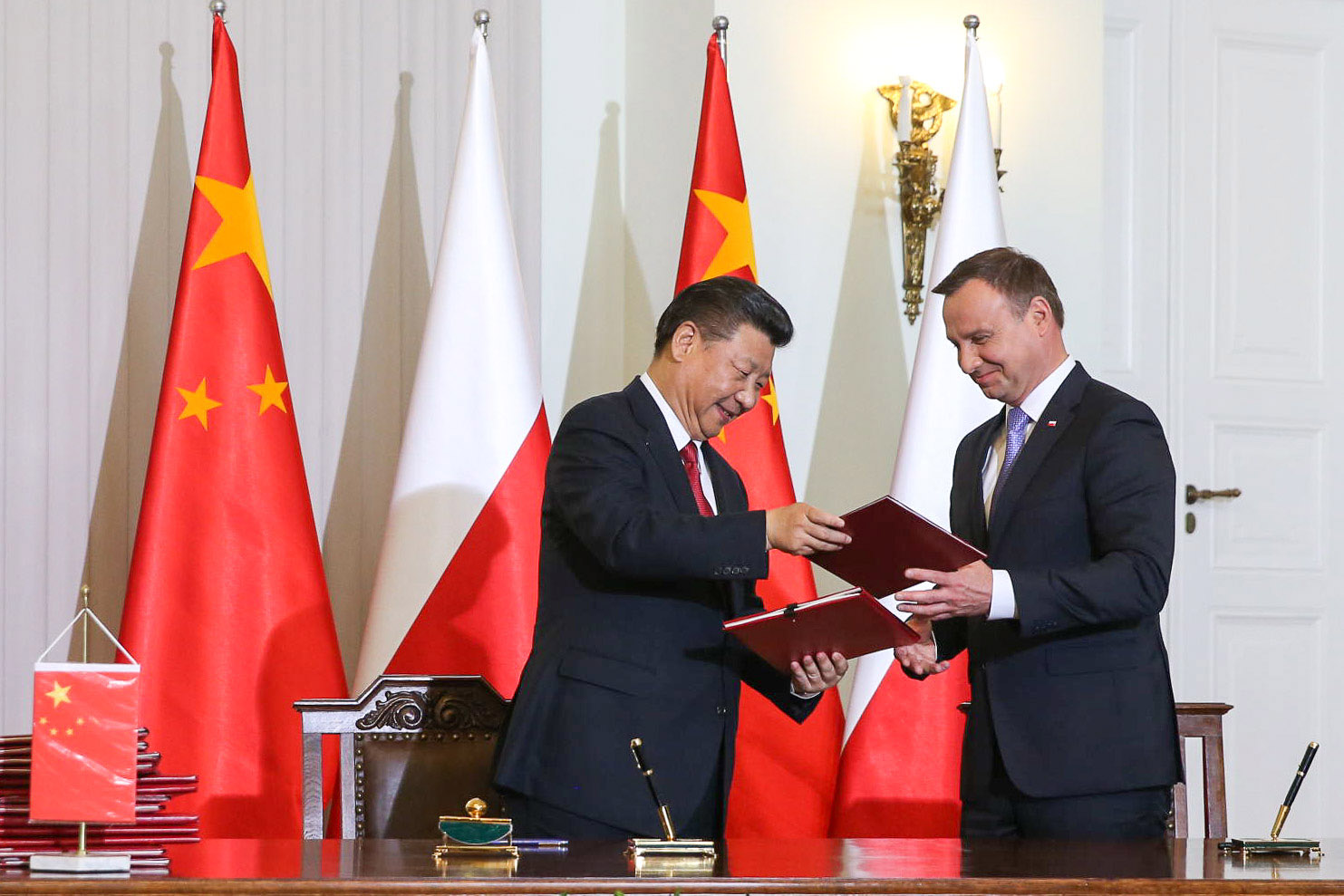
Duda and Xi Jinping signing a declaration on strategic partnership, June 2016

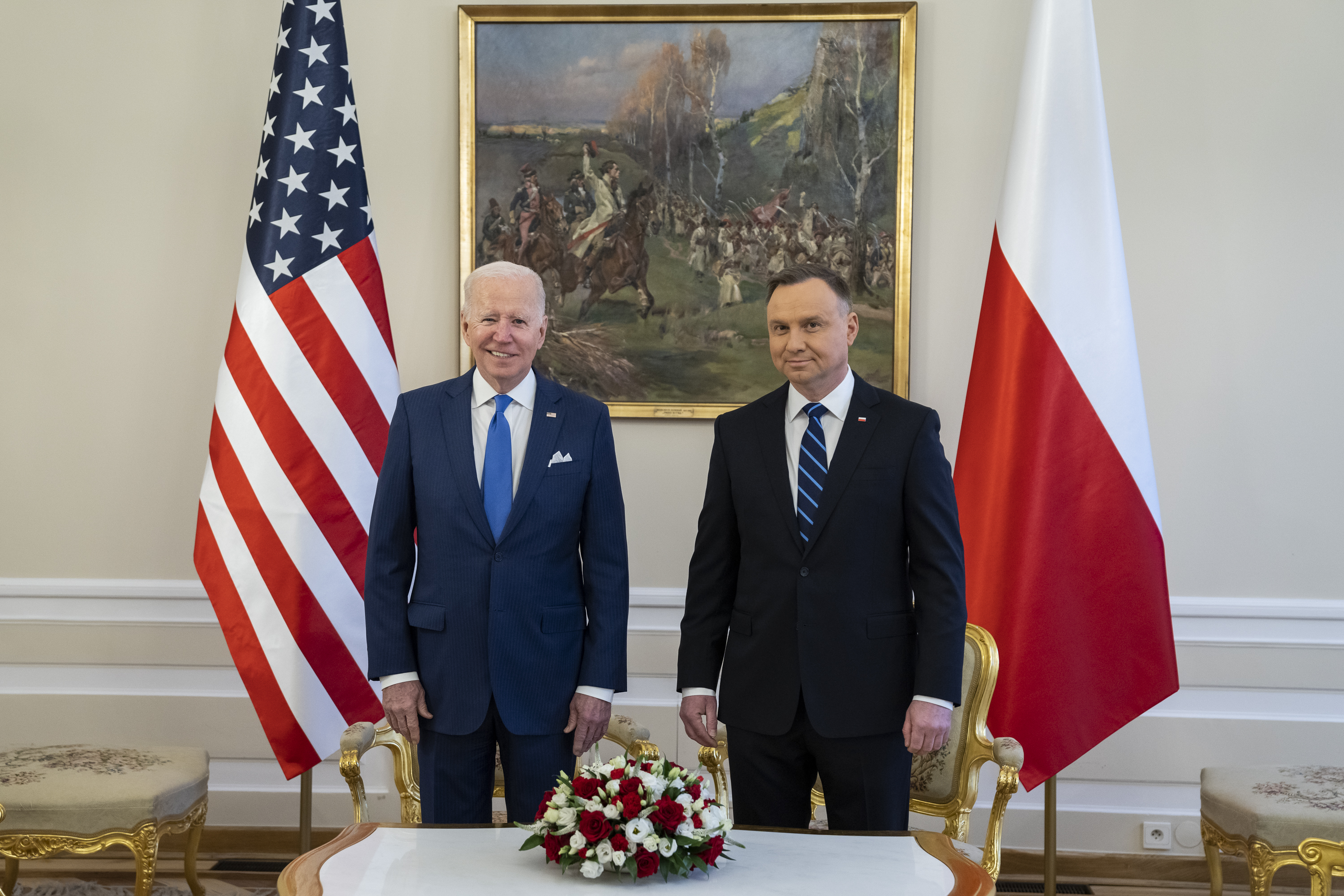
Duda with U.S. President Joe Biden in Warsaw, March 2022

The first five-year term of Andrzej Duda began on 6 August 2015, with the taking of an oath of office during a National Assembly session.

Duda rejected the European Union's proposal of migrant quotas to redistribute asylum seekers, saying: "I won't agree to a dictate of the strong. I won't back a Europe where the economic advantage of the size of a population will be a reason to force solutions on other countries regardless of their national interests".

In September 2015, Prime Minister Ewa Kopacz declared that Poland, as an expression of "European solidarity", would take in 2,000 people over the next two years, mainly from Syria and Eritrea (out of 3,700 originally requested).

Duda and Croatian President Kolinda Grabar-Kitarović were the originators of the Three Seas Initiative.

Duda repeatedly met with general secretary of the Chinese Communist Party, Xi Jinping, stating that "Polish companies will benefit hugely" from China's Belt and Road Initiative. Duda and Xi signed a declaration on strategic partnership in which they reiterated that Poland and China viewed each other as long-term strategic partners. Duda said that he hopes Poland will become a gateway to Europe for China.

In September 2017, his approval rating stood at 71% and in February 2018, at 72%, a record surpassed only by Aleksander Kwaśniewski, whose approval ratings surpassed 75% from 1995 to 2005.

On 27 December 2021, Duda vetoed the Lex TVN bill, a PiS government bill to counter foreign ownership in Polish media.

In 2022, Duda vetoed a proposed reform of the Polish educational system, dubbed in Polish media "Lex Czarnek". It has been described as controversial due to its implied criticism of the teachings on liberal issues such as LGBT rights and sex education.

On 6 June 2023, Duda presented three goals of Poland's presidency in the European Union in the first half of 2025. The first goal is to deepen transatlantic cooperation and strengthen the relationship between the European Union and the United States. The second goal is to further expand the community to include Ukraine, Moldova, and the Western Balkans, and in the future, other aspiring countries as well. The third goal will be to enhance Europe's energy security.

In 2024, Duda criticised plans by Prime Minister Donald Tusk to suspend the right to asylum in Poland by irregular migrants, calling it a "fatal mistake" that would also affect dissidents from Russia and Belarus.

=== Pardon of Mariusz Kamiński ===
In November 2015, on the basis of Article 139 of the Constitution of Poland, Duda pardoned former Central Anticorruption Bureau (CBA) head Mariusz Kamiński and three CBA officers convicted by a court of 1st instance in the so-called "Land Affair", marking the first pardon granted by a president before reaching a final verdict. According to some lawyers (including professors Jan Zimmermann – Andrzej Duda's doctorate promoter, Leszek Kubicki – former Minister of Justice and Andrzej Zoll – former president of the Constitutional Tribunal) Duda acted in violation of the Constitution of Poland.

=== Constitutional crisis ===
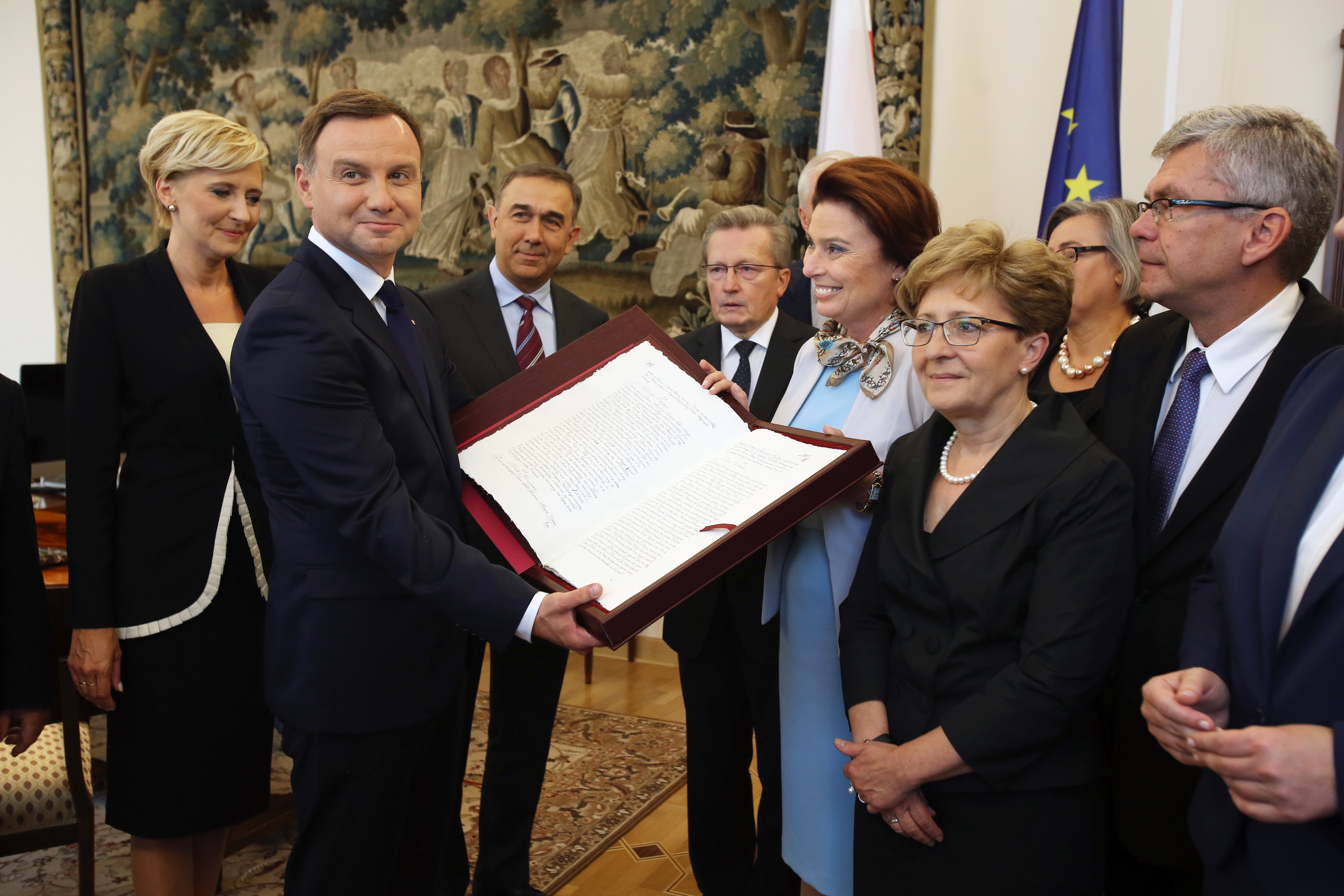
Andrzej Duda during a meeting with the Council of Seniors of the Sejm and the Council of Seniors of the Senate at the Sejm

Andrzej Duda refused to swear in any of the five Constitutional Tribunal judge candidates selected by the Sejm of the VII term. Three of them had been selected since 7 November 2015, whose election was declared constitutional. Between 3 and 9 December 2015, Duda swore in five other candidates for the same office selected by the Sejm of the VIII term.

On 28 December 2015, Duda signed the Constitutional Tribunal bill (passed on 22 December 2015 by the Sejm), which unequivocally breaches the Constitution of Poland according to the National Council of the Judiciary of Poland, the Public Prosecutor General and the Polish Ombudsman.

In July 2017, Duda informed the public that he had decided to veto two controversial judicial bills backed by the government and passed by both houses of the Polish parliament. The President's spokesman subsequently said that the third act – the common courts bill – would be signed. The veto was just one example of Duda opposing the policies of PiS.

=== Politics of memory and the Holocaust ===
In February 2018, Duda said that he would sign into law the Amendment to the Act on the Institute of National Remembrance, making it illegal to accuse "the Polish nation" of complicity in the Holocaust and other Nazi German atrocities, a measure that has roiled relations with Israel, with Prime Minister Benjamin Netanyahu going as far as accusing the Polish government of "Holocaust denial".

In September 2022, Duda and his wife attended the funeral of Holocaust survivor Edward Mosberg in the United States, and Duda announced that he was awarding Mosberg the Grand Cross of the Order of Merit of the Republic of Poland, the highest Polish award in its class. He awarded it in recognition of Mosberg's achievements in advancing Polish-Jewish dialogue and developing cooperation between nations, and for preserving the memory of and communicating what happened in the Holocaust.

=== Stance on LGBTQ rights ===
In June 2020, Duda said that he would not allow gay couples to marry or adopt children, while describing the LGBTQ movement as "a foreign ideology" and comparing it to indoctrination in the Soviet Union. He also pledged he would ban "LGBTQ teaching" in schools. In response to Duda's comments, former Prime Minister of Belgium Elio Di Rupo publicly asked the European Commission for an official reaction. Soon after his comments, Duda invited presidential candidate Robert Biedroń (who had asked to meet the president) and an LGBTQ activist, Bartosz Staszewski, to the Presidential Palace, though Robert Biedroń eventually turned down the invitation, refusing to meet President Duda until he apologised. According to Staszewski, during their meeting Duda cited freedom of speech to defend his words about "LGBTQ ideology".

On 4 July 2020, Duda proposed changing the constitution to ban LGBTQ couples from adopting children. On 6 July 2020, he signed a document with a presidential draft of the amendment to the Polish Constitution.

=== Foreign policy ===
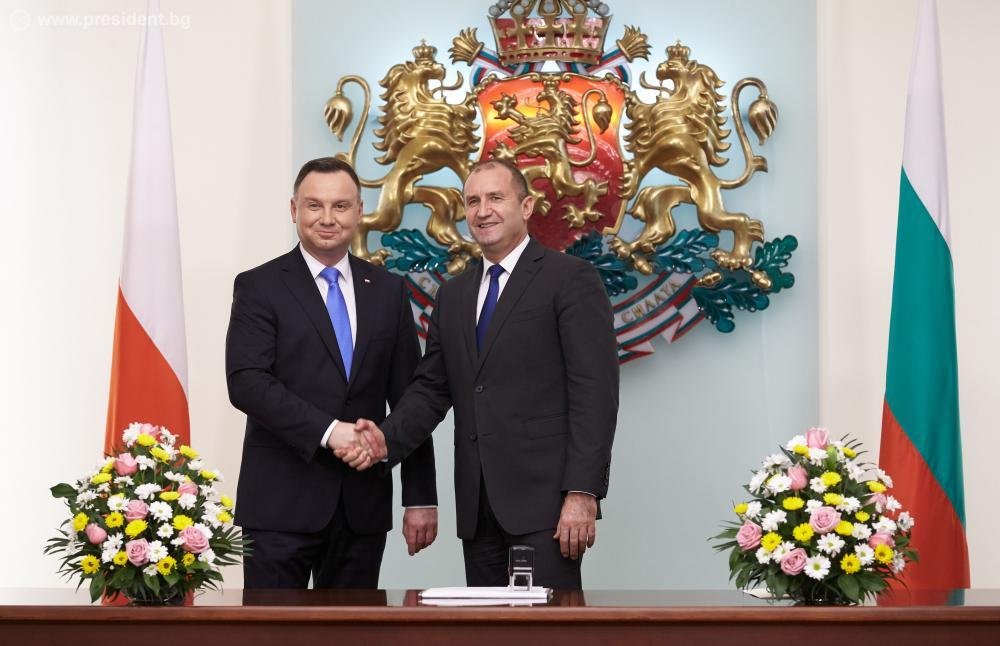
Duda with Bulgarian President Rumen Radev in Sofia, on 27 November 2018

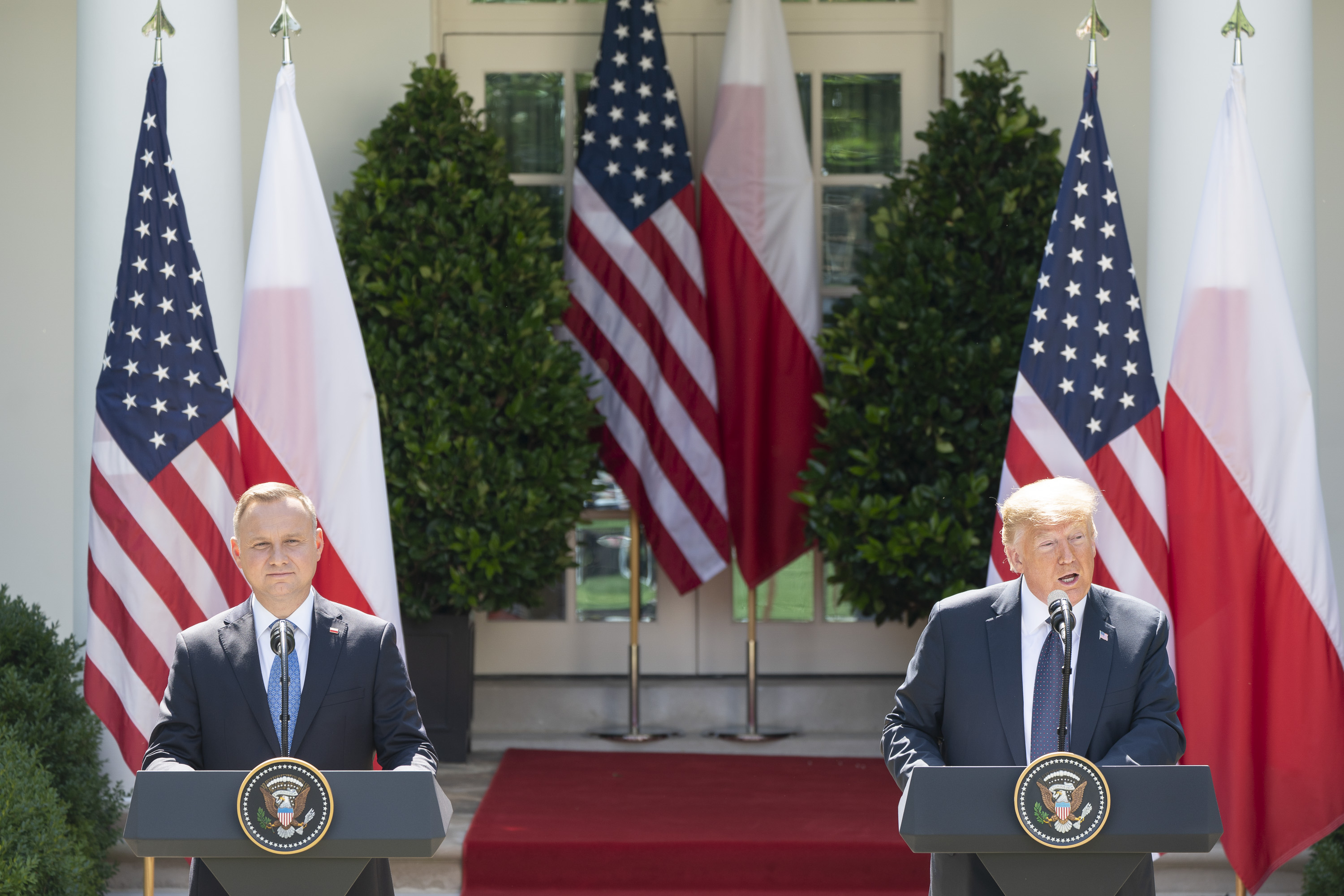
Duda was the first foreign leader to travel to the White House since the start of the COVID-19 pandemic.

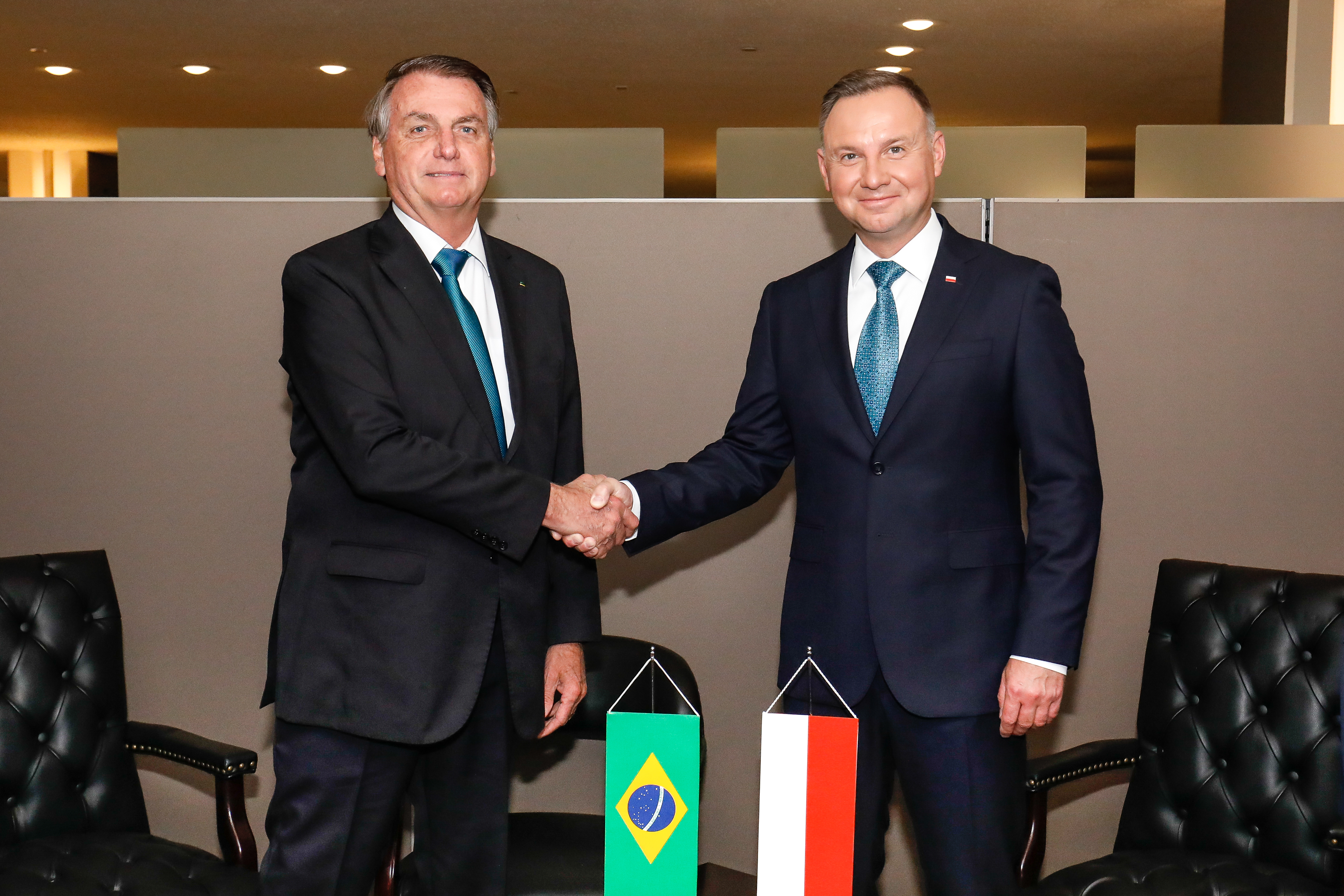
Duda with Brazilian President Jair Bolsonaro in New York, 21 September 2021

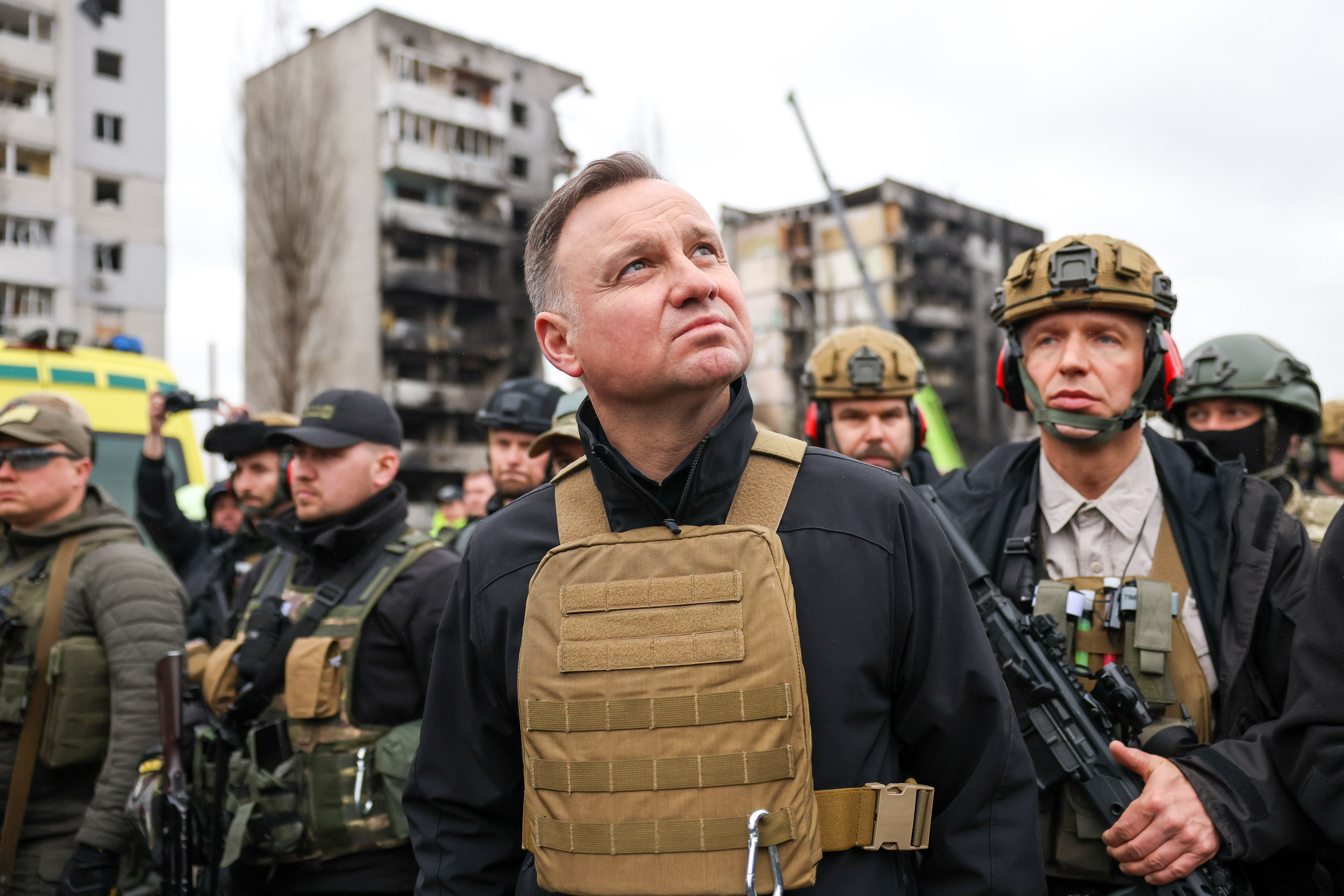
Andrzej Duda in Ukraine in April 2022

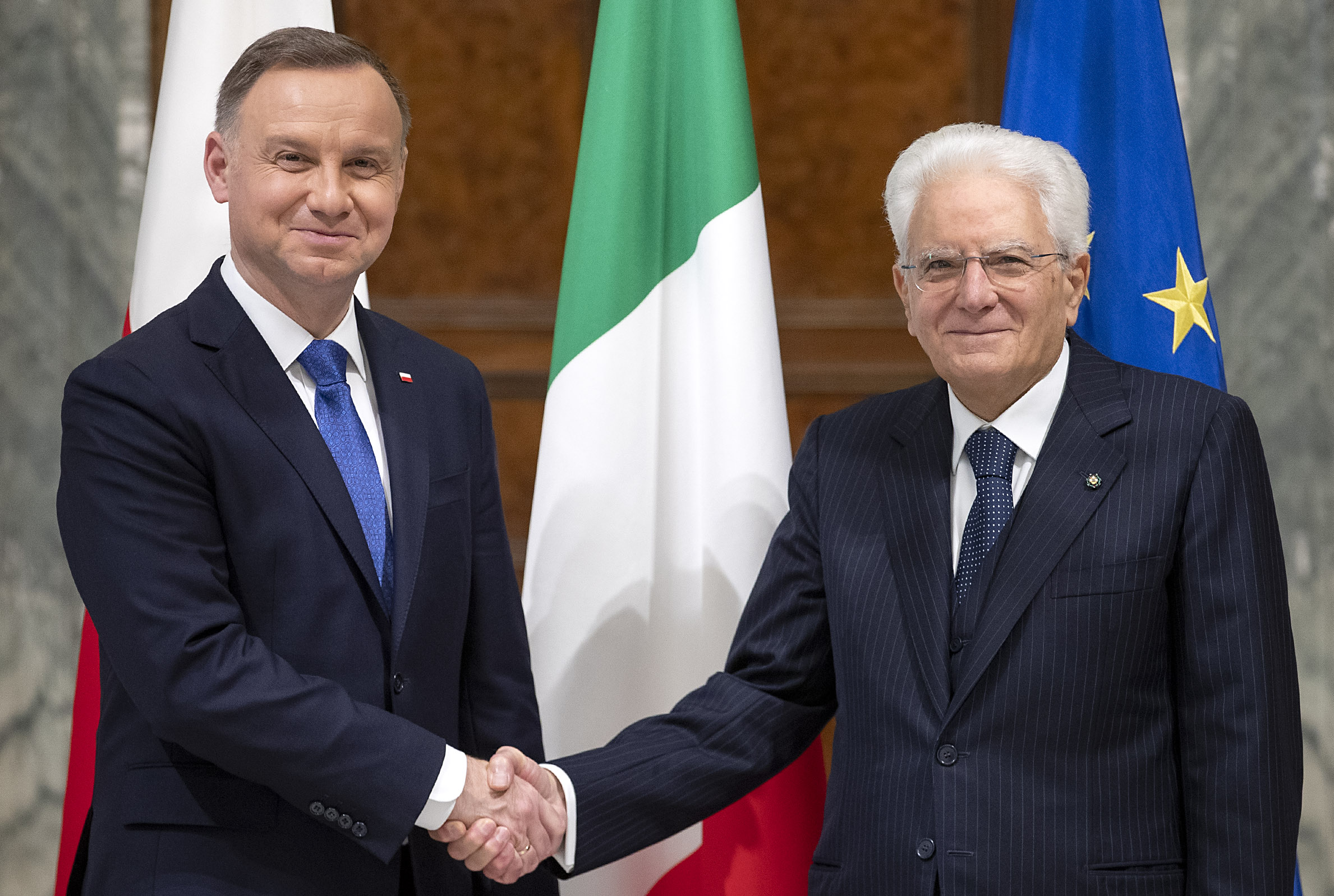
Duda with Italian President Sergio Mattarella in Rome, on 18 October 2022

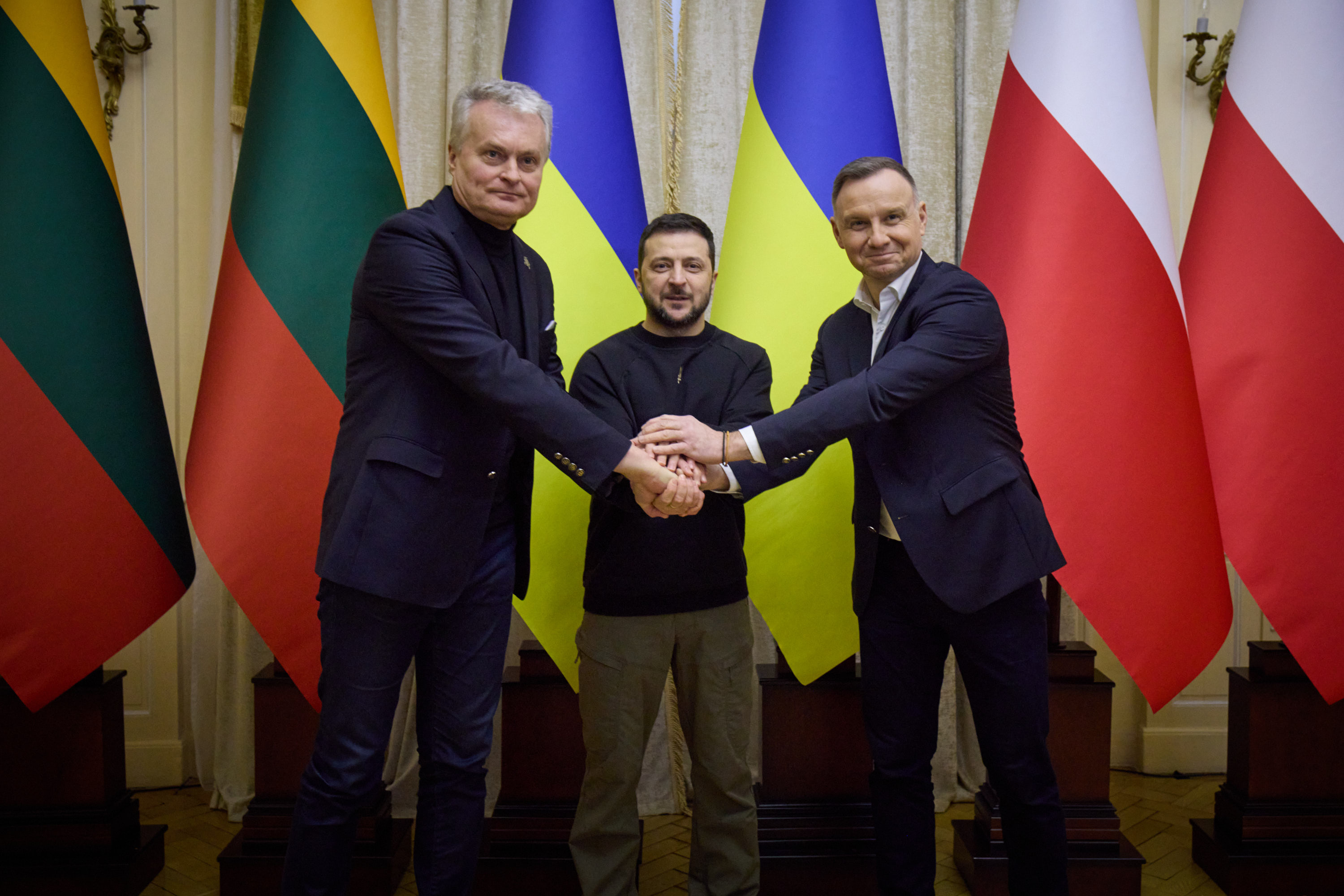
Duda, Volodymyr Zelenskyy and Gitanas Nausėda held a meeting in the format of the Lublin Triangle in Lviv, Ukraine, 11 January 2023

In October 2017, he met with Turkish President Recep Tayyip Erdoğan and supported Turkey's accession to the European Union.

U.S. President Donald Trump praised Duda, saying: "He's doing a terrific job." In September 2019, Trump and Duda agreed to send 1,000 U.S. troops to Poland.

On 24 June 2020, Trump said at a press conference with Duda that the United States planned to move some U.S. troops from Germany to Poland. Trump said that "Poland is one of the few countries that are fulfilling their obligations under NATO — in particular, their monetary obligations — and they asked us if we would send some additional troops. They're going to pay for that."

In February 2022, Duda attended the opening ceremony of the Olympic Winter Games in Beijing and met with Chinese President Xi Jinping. Some Polish diplomats criticised Duda's visit to China because some of Poland's Western allies boycotted the Winter Olympics in China due to the alleged Uyghur genocide and other human rights abuses in China.

In October 2022, Duda declared that Poland would be willing to host U.S. nuclear weapons.

In March 2023, Duda visited gas-rich Qatar and the United Arab Emirates. He focused on energy security and cooperation.

On 7 October 2023, he condemned Hamas' actions during the Gaza war and expressed his support to Israel and its right to self-defense.

On 9 January 2025, Duda asked Prime Minister Donald Tusk and his government to guarantee safe passage for Israeli Prime Minister Benjamin Netanyahu to travel to an event marking the 80th anniversary of the liberation of the Auschwitz concentration camp by Soviet troops, despite Netanyahu facing an arrest warrant from the International Criminal Court for Israeli war crimes in the Gaza war. In response, Tusk guaranteed safe passage for Netanyahu.

=== Lex Tusk ===
On 29 May 2023, during a press conference, Duda announced the intention to sign the "Lex Tusk", a law establishing a commission to investigate Russian influence in Poland. According to the law, the commission is expected to publish its first report in September before the parliamentary elections. The law reached the president's desk after the Sejm rejected the Senate's veto on the matter on 26 May. The Senate recommended the rejection of the law in its entirety due to its anti-democratic nature, numerous errors, and 13 potential violations of the constitution. On 7 June 2023, the European Commission initiated legal proceedings against Poland regarding the extensively debated law. Brussels was concerned that the law might be used to target opposition politicians in the country's general election, which was scheduled and took place in late 2023.

== Post-presidency (2025–present) ==
Duda's term ended on 6 August 2025. On the same day, he released a biographical book titled It's Me, which he worked on together with Maciej Zdziarski. He promoted the book in conversations with podcasters.

On 1 September 2025, in an interview with journalist Bogdan Rymanowski, he revealed his plan to establish a think tank. In September 2025, he also began a collaboration with Kanał Zero to produce his own program series, which is scheduled to air starting on 15 September 2025. In October 2025 he joined ZEN.com fintech as the board member.

== Personal life ==
Duda is married to Agata Kornhauser-Duda, a teacher of German at Jan III Sobieski High School in Kraków. They met as high school students at a party. The couple have been married since 21 December 1994. They have one daughter named Kinga (b. 1995). Duda's father-in-law is Julian Kornhauser, a well-known writer, translator and literary critic.

Duda is a keen skier, and he participated in the Polish Academic Championships in Alpine skiing while he was a university student.

Duda is a practising Roman Catholic. He has taken part publicly in Catholic religious ceremonies on many occasions, including Midnight Mass, the blessing of food on Holy Saturday, and the Corpus Christi procession in Kraków.

== Honours and awards ==
=== National honours ===
Country	Decoration	Date of issue
Poland	Order of the White Eagle (ex officio)	6 August 2015
Poland	Grand Cross of the Order of Polonia Restituta	6 August 2015

=== Foreign honours ===
Country	Decoration	Date of issue
Portugal	Grand Cross of the Order of Merit	1 September 2008
Belgium	Grand Cordon of the Order of Leopold	7 October 2015
Czech Republic	Collar of the Order of the White Lion	15 March 2016
Bulgaria	Order of the Balkan Mountains 1st Class	14 April 2016
Norway	Grand Cross of the Royal Norwegian Order of St. Olav	23 May 2016
Romania	Grand Cross with Collar of the Order of the Star of Romania	10 July 2016
Finland	Grand Cross with Collar of the Order of the White Rose of Finland	24 October 2017
Greece	Grand Cross of the Order of the Redeemer	18 November 2017
Latvia	Commander Grand Cross with Chain of the Order of the Three Stars	27 June 2018
Lithuania	Grand Cross with Golden Chain of the Order of Vytautas the Great	21 February 2019
Slovakia	Order of the White Double Cross 1st Class	9 May 2019
Hungary	Grand Cross of the Hungarian Order of Merit	9 September 2021
Ukraine	Order of Prince Yaroslav the Wise 1st Class	23 August 2021
Cyprus	Grand Collar of the Order of Makarios III	7 October 2021
North Macedonia	Grand Cross of the Order 8-September	24 October 2022
Latvia	Order of Viesturs 1st Class	1 February 2023
Italy	Knight Grand Cross decorated with Grand Cordon of the Order of Merit of the Italian Republic	17 April 2023
Lithuania	Grand Cross of the Order of the Cross of Vytis	5 July 2023
South Korea	Grand Order of Mugunghwa	13 July 2023
Portugal	Grand Collar of the Order of Prince Henry	22 August 2023
Jordan	Bejewelled Grand Cordon of the Supreme Order of the Renaissance	19 November 2024
Latvia	Commander of the Grand Cross of the Cross of Recognition	18 February 2025
Sovereign Military Order of Malta	Collar of the Order pro Merito Melitensi	27 March 2025
Estonia	Grand Cross with Collar of the Order of the Cross of Terra Mariana	8 April 2025
Ukraine	Order of Liberty	28 June 2025

- International Olympic Committee: Gold Olympic Order (23 July 2022)
- Polish Orthodox Church: Order of Saint Mary Magdalene, 1st Class (14 November 2024)

== See also ==
- List of international presidential trips made by Andrzej Duda
- Office approval rating of Andrzej Duda

== Footnotes ==
Political offices
Preceded by Bronisław Komorowski	President of Poland; 2015 – 2025	Succeeded by Karol Nawrocki
