= List of international presidential trips made by Andrzej Duda =

International trips made by the 6th president of Poland

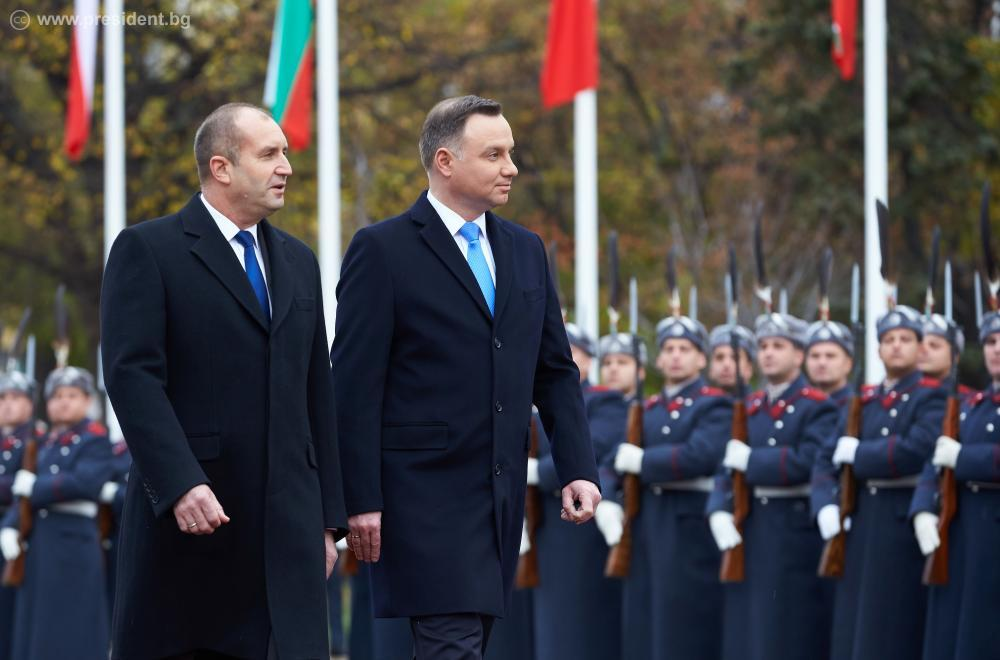
Duda and Rumen Radev during a visit to Bulgaria in 2018

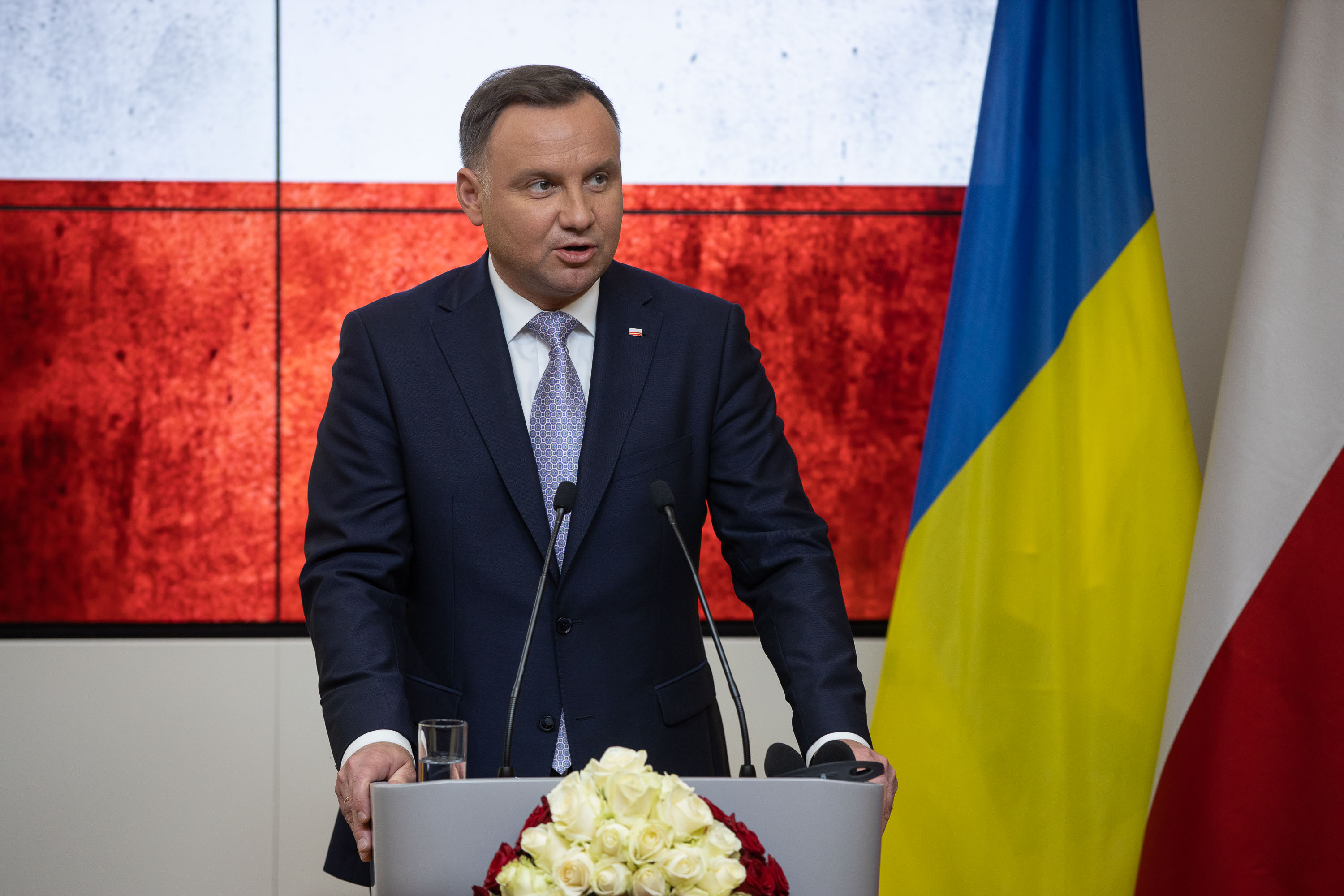
Duda in Brussels in 2019

Below is a list of international trips made by Andrzej Duda, the 6th President of Poland.

== Number of visits ==
As of October 2026, Duda has made international trips to 63 different countries since his tenure began on 6 August 2015. The number of visits per country are as follows:

- One visit to Afghanistan, Australia, Austria,Azerbaijan, Bosnia and Herzegovina, Canada, Cyprus, Denmark, Ethiopia, Finland, Iceland, Israel, Ivory Coast, Japan, Jordan, Kazakhstan, Kuwait, Kenya, Luxembourg, Mexico, Mongolia, Montenegro, New Zealand, Nigeria, North Macedonia, Norway, Palestine, Senegal, South Korea, Spain, Sweden, Tajikistan, United Arab Emirates and Vietnam
- Two visits to Albania, China, Croatia, Egypt, Greece, Malta, Moldova, Netherlands, Qatar, Portugal, Slovenia and Turkey
- Four visits to Latvia
- Five visits to Bulgaria, Estonia and Georgia
- Six visits to France
- Seven visits to Czech Republic, Hungary, United Kingdom, Romania and Switzerland
- Nine visits to Lithuania and Vatican City
- Eleven visits to Belgium and Germany
- Twelve visits to Slovakia
- Fourteen visits to Ukraine and Italy
- Twenty visits to the United States

== 2015 ==
| Country | Location | Date |
|---|---|---|
| Estonia | Tallinn | 23 August |
| Germany | Berlin | 28 August |
| United Kingdom | London | 14–15 September |
| Germany | Erfurt | 21–22 September |
| United States | New York City | 25–29 September |
| Slovakia | Červený Kláštor | 2 October |
| Hungary | Balatonfüred | 8–9 October |
| France | Paris | 28 October |
| Romania | Bucharest | 3–4 November |
| Vatican | Vatican City | 8–9 November |
| China | Beijing, Shanghai, Suzhou | 22–27 November |
| Ukraine | Kyiv | 14–15 December |

== 2016 ==
| Country | Location | Date |
|---|---|---|
| Belgium | Brussels | 17–18 January |
| Germany | Munich | 12–13 February |
| Slovakia | Tatranská Lomnica | 28 February |
| Czech Republic | Prague | 14–15 March |
| Hungary | Budapest | 17–19 March |
| United States | Washington | 30 March – 1 April |
| Bulgaria | Sofia | 17–18 April |
| Portugal | Lisbon | 26–27 April |
| Canada | Ottawa, Toronto | 9–12 May |
| Italy | Rome, Monte Cassino | 16–18 May |
| Norway | Oslo, Bodø, Håkvik | 22–25 May |
| Italy; Vatican | Rome, Naples, Pompei; Vatican City | 3–5 June |
| Denmark | Copenhagen | 8–10 June |
| France | Nice | 12 June |
| Germany | Berlin | 16–17 June |
| Estonia | Tallinn | 26 June |
| Slovakia | Bratislava | 29–30 June |
| Ukraine | Kyiv | 23–24 August |
| Croatia | Dubrovnik | 25–26 August |
| Bulgaria | Sofia | 14–15 September |
| United States | New York City, Doylestown | 18-21 September |
| Hungary | Budapest | 22 October |
| Jordan | Amman | 6–7 November |
| Switzerland | Bern, Rapperswil | 13–15 November |
| France | Strasbourg | 16 November |
| Sweden | Stockholm | 29 November – 1 December |
| Germany | Berlin | 11 December |

== 2017 ==
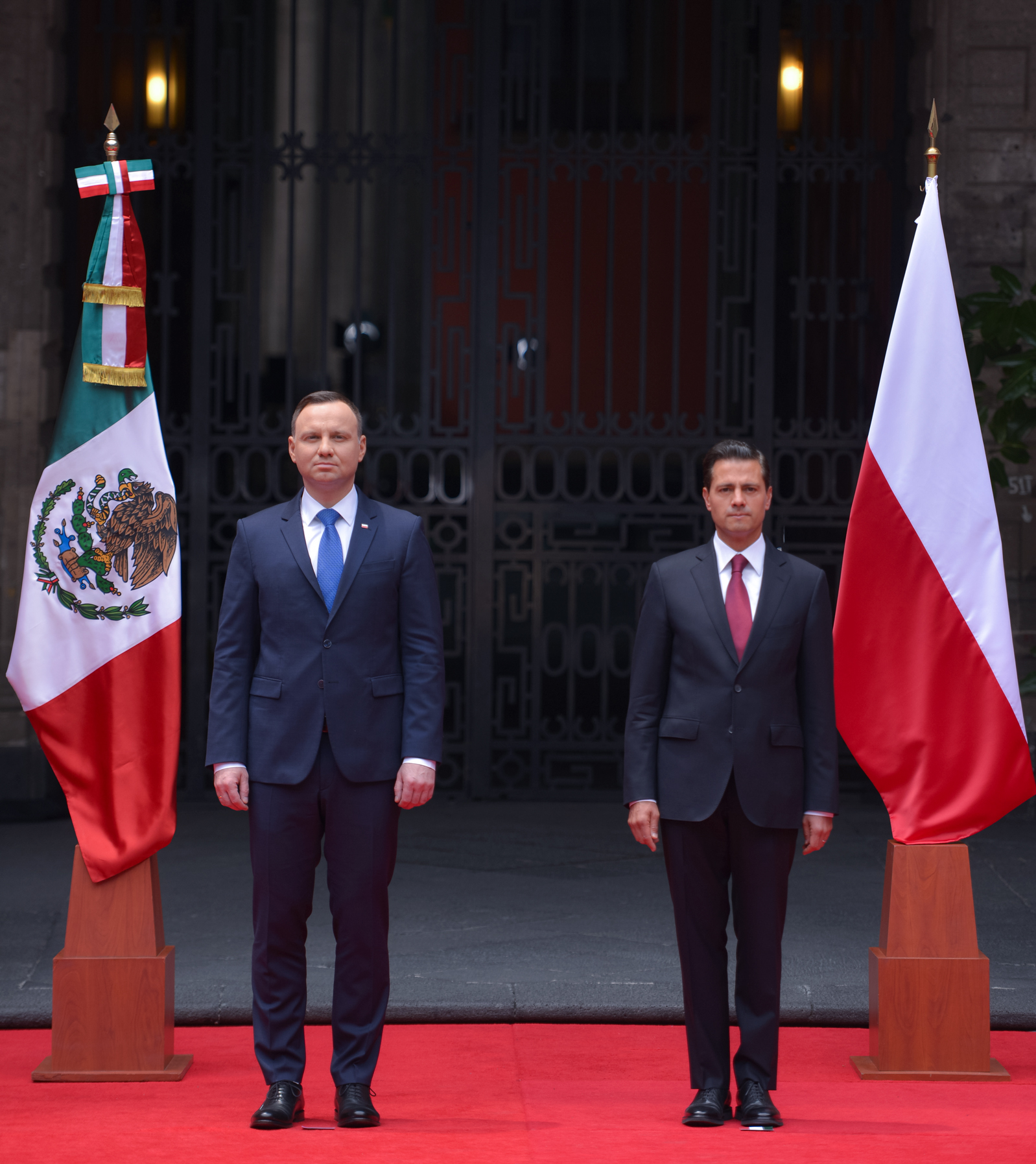
Duda and Enrique Peña Nieto at the National Palace in Mexico City.

| Country | Location | Date |
|---|---|---|
| Israel | Jerusalem, Bethlehem | 16–19 January |
| Germany | Munich | 17–18 February |
| Slovenia | Ljubljana | 26–27 March |
| Mexico | Mexico City | 22–25 April |
| Ethiopia | Addis Ababa | 6–10 May |
| Belgium | Brussels | 25 May |
| Slovakia | Bratislava | 26 May |
| Georgia | Tbilisi | 30–31 May |
| Croatia | Zagreb | 13–14 June |
| France | Strasbourg | 1 July |
| Kazakhstan | Astana | 6–7 September |
| Malta | Valletta | 14–15 September |
| United States | New York City, West Point | 19–21 September |
| Hungary | Szekszárd | 13–14 October |
| Finland | Helsinki | 24–25 October |
| Greece | Athens | 21–22 November |
| Vietnam | Hanoi, Ho Chi Minh City | 28–30 November |
| Ukraine | Kharkiv | 13 December |
| Kuwait | Kuwait City | 21 December |

== 2018 ==
| Country | Location | Date | Details |
|---|---|---|---|
| United States | New York City | 18 January | |
| Switzerland | Davos | 23–26 January | |
| South Korea | Seoul, Pyeongchang County | 8–10 February | See 2018 Winter Olympics opening ceremony |
| Lithuania | Vilnius | 15–17 February | See Centennial of the Restored State of Lithuania |
| Hungary | Veszprém | 23–24 March | |
| Afghanistan | Bagram | 26 March | |
| Tajikistan | Dushanbe | 26 March | |
| Georgia | Tbilisi | 26 March | |
| United States | New York City, Jersey City, Chicago | 16–20 May | |
| Georgia | Tbilisi | 26 May | |
| Estonia | Tallinn | 22 June | |
| Latvia | Riga, Daugavpils, Ādaži | 27–28 June | |
| Ukraine | Lutsk | 8 July | |
| Belgium | Brussels | 11–12 July | |
| Australia | Canberra, Melbourne, Sydney | 17-21 August | |
| New Zealand | Auckland, Wellington | 22–23 August | |
| Latvia | Rundāle Palace | 13 September | |
| Romania | Bucharest | 17 September | |
| United States | Washington | 18 September | |
| United States | New York City | 24–26 September | |
| Switzerland | Geneva | 8–9 October | |
| Slovakia | Štrbské Pleso | 11–12 October | |
| Italy; Vatican | Rome; Vatican City | 15–16 October | |
| Germany | Berlin, Biesenthal | 22–23 October | |
| Bulgaria | Sofia | 26–27 November | |
| United States | Washington, D.C. | 5 December | |
| Romania | Craiova | 19 December | |

== 2019 ==
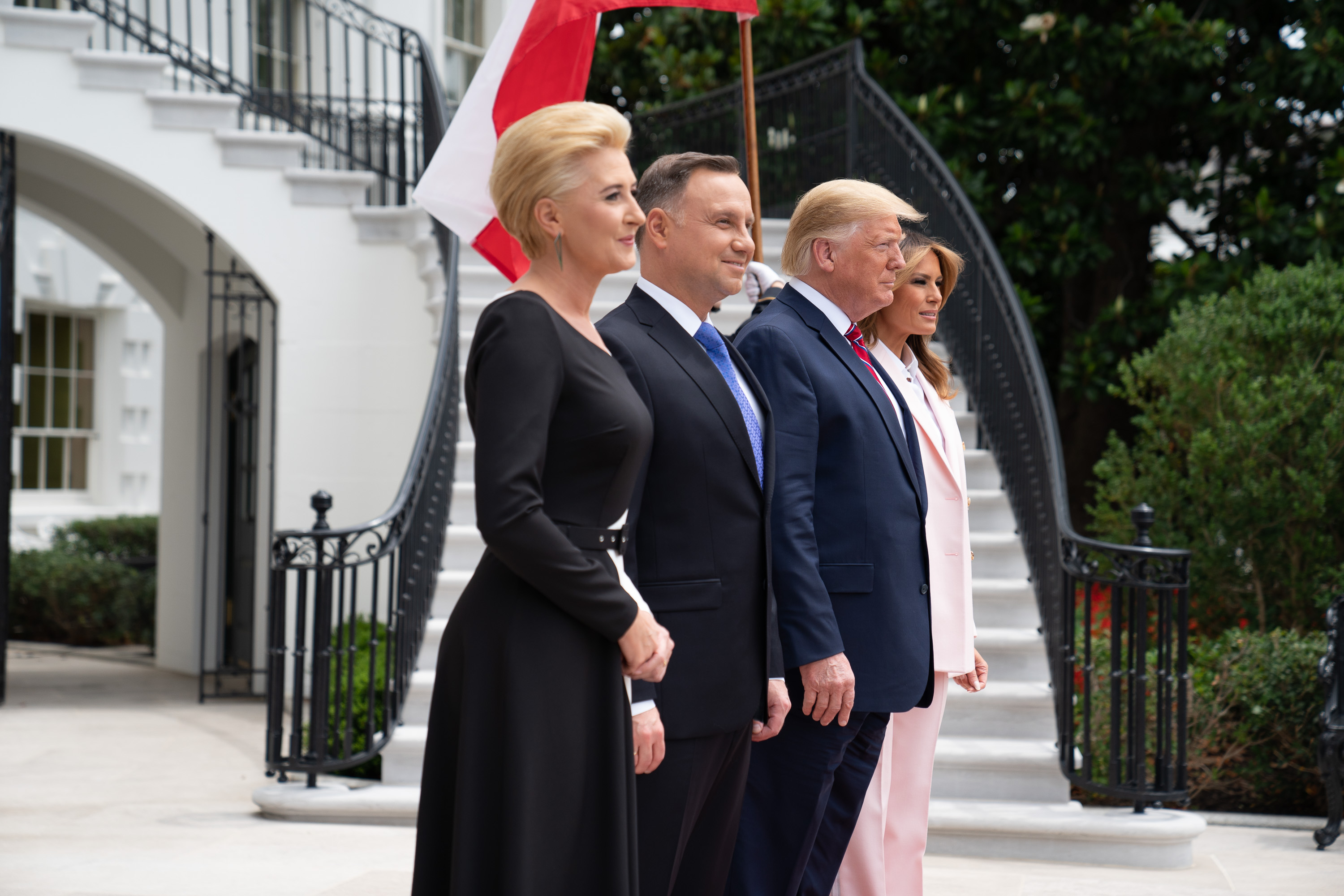
President Duda and his wife Agata Kornhauser-Duda with President Donald Trump and First Lady Melania Trump pose for a photo at the South Portico entrance of the White House.

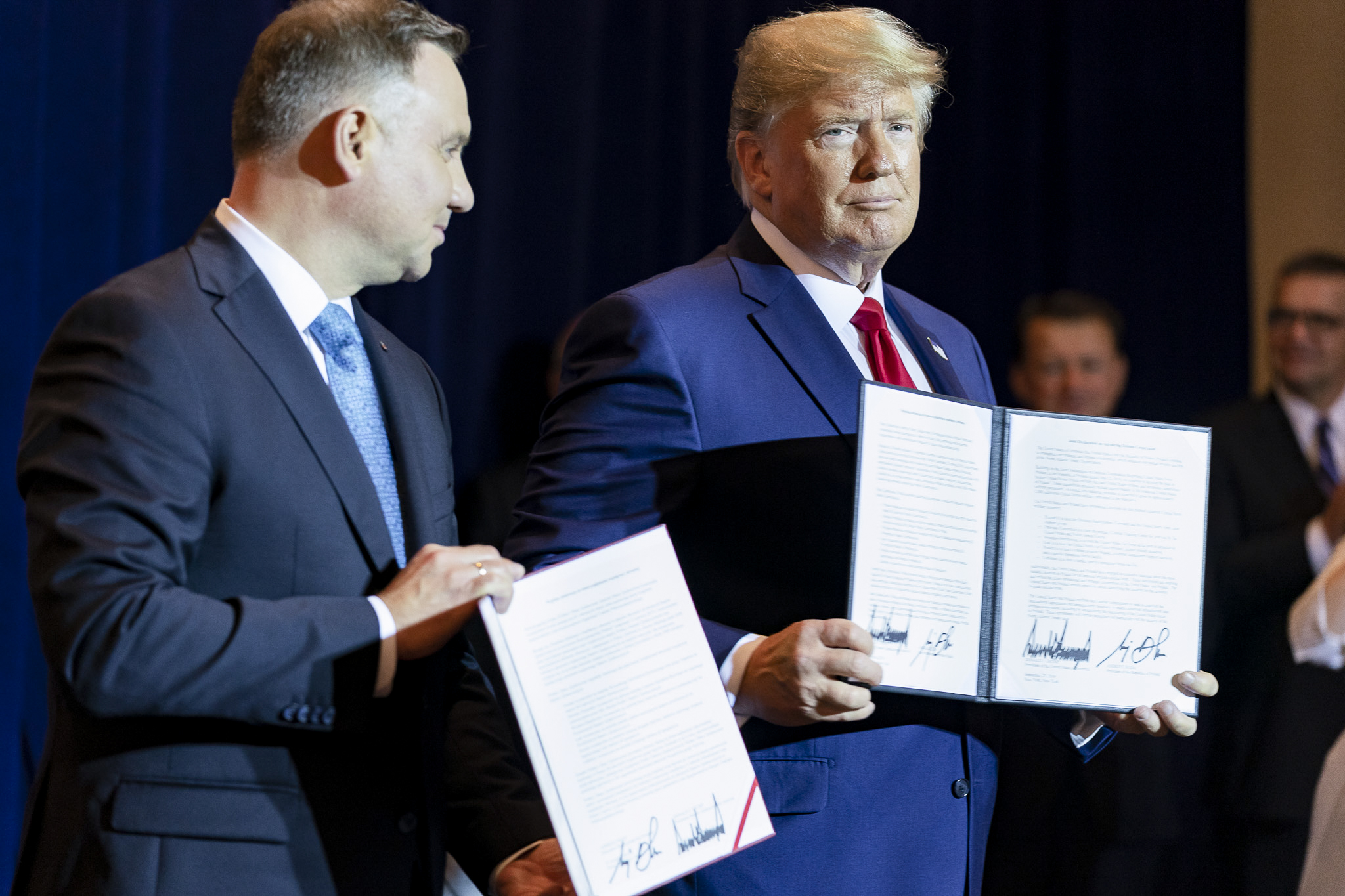
President Donald Trump participates in a signing ceremony with President Duda in New York City, September 2019.

| Country | Location | Date |
|---|---|---|
| Switzerland | Davos | 21–25 January |
| Slovakia | Košice | 28 February |
| Czech Republic | Prague | 12 March |
| Bosnia and Herzegovina | Sarajevo | 15 April |
| Albania | Tirana | 8–9 May |
| Italy | Monte Cassino | 18 May |
| Azerbaijan | Baku | 30–31 May |
| Belgium | Brussels | 4–5 June |
| Slovenia | Ljubljana | 5–6 June |
| United States | Washington, D.C., Houston, Reno, Silicon Valley, Los Angeles | 12–17 June |
| United States | New Britain, New York City | 22–26 September |
| Belgium | Brussels, Lommel | 28-30 September |
| Czech Republic | Lany | 2–3 October |
| Greece | Athens | 11 October |
| Netherlands | The Hague, Breda | 29–30 October |
| Germany | Berlin | 9 November |
| Lithuania | Vilnius | 20–22 November |
| United Kingdom | London, Watford | 3–4 December |
| Belgium; Luxembourg | Bastogne; Hamm | 16 December |
| Italy | Sicily | 19 December |

== 2020 ==
| Country | Location | Date |
|---|---|---|
| Switzerland | Davos | 21–23 January |
| United States | Washington, D.C. | 23–24 June |
| Italy | Rome | 23–24 September |
| Vatican | Vatican City | 23–24 September |
| Ukraine | Kyiv, Odesa | 11–13 October |
| Estonia | Tallinn | 19 October |
| Lithuania | Vilnius | 17–18 November |
| Czech Republic | Prague | 9 December |

== 2021 ==
| Country | Location | Date |
|---|---|---|
| Romania | Bucharest | 9–11 May |
| Turkey | Ankara, İncirlik, Polonezköy, Istanbul | 23–25 May |
| Georgia | Tbilisi | 26–27 May |
| Belgium | Brussels | 13–14 June |
| Slovakia | Bratislava | 15 June |
| Bulgaria | Sofia | 8–9 July |
| Japan | Tokyo | 22–24 July |
| Ukraine | Kyiv | 22–24 August |
| Moldova | Chișinau | 26–27 August |
| Hungary | Budapest | 8–9 September |
| Italy | Rome | 15–16 September |
| United States | New York City, Linden | 21–24 September |
| Cyprus | Nicosia, Paphos | 7–8 October |
| Lithuania | Vilnius | 18–20 October |
| France | Paris | 27 October |
| Slovakia | Bratislava | 9 November |
| Montenegro | Cetinje, Podgorica | 17 November |
| North Macedonia | Skopje | 18–19 November |
| Belgium | Brussels | 25 November |
| Hungary | Budapest | 29–30 November |
| Qatar | Doha, Ras Laffan Industrial City | 4–5 December |
| Ukraine | Ivano-Frankivsk, Huta (Ivano-Frankivsk Raion) | 19–20 December |

== 2022 ==
| Country | Location | Date | Details |
|---|---|---|---|
| Georgia | Tbilisi | 4 February | |
| China | Beijing | 4–6 February | |
| Belgium | Brussels | 7 February | |
| Germany | Berlin | 8 February | |
| Ukraine | Kyiv | 23 February | Day before the 2022 Russian invasion of Ukraine, President Duda together with his Lithuanian counterpart Gitanas Nausėda visited Zelensky to express solidarity and support. |
| Turkey | Ankara | 16 March | Duda traveled to Ankara to discuss Russia's invasion of Ukraine, EU-Turkey relations and preparations for the NATO Summit with President Recep Tayyip Erdoğan. |
| Moldova | Chișinau | 21 March | |
| Bulgaria | Sofia | 22 March | |
| Romania | Bucharest | 22 March | |
| Belgium | Brussels | 24 March | |
| Italy | Rome | 31 March – 1 April | |
| Vatican | Vatican City | 31 March – 1 April | |
| United Kingdom | London | 4 April | |
| Ukraine | Kyiv, Borodianka, Irpin, Bucha | 13 April | |
| Czech Republic | Prague | 27 April | |
| Lithuania | Jauniūnai, Vilnius | 5 May | |
| Slovakia | Bratislava | 11 May | |
| Estonia | Tallinn | 13 May | |
| Ukraine | Kyiv | 22 May | |
| Switzerland | Davos | 24 May | |
| Egypt | Cairo | 29–31 May | |
| Portugal | Braga | 8–9 June | |
| Italy | Rome | 9 June | |
| Romania | Bucharest | 10 June | |
| Latvia | Riga, Ādaži | 20–21 June | |
| Spain | Madrid | 29–30 June | |
| Lithuania | Marijampolė | 7 July | |
| Ukraine | Kyiv | 23 August | |
| Nigeria | Abuja | 6 September | |
| Ivory Coast | Abidjan | 7 September | |
| Senegal | Dakar | 8 September | |
| United Kingdom | London | 18-19 September | |
| United States | New York | 20-22 September | |
| Malta | Valletta | 5-6 October | |
| Slovakia | Bratislava | 11 October | |
| Vatican | Vatican City | 16 October | |
| Italy | Roma | 16-18 October | |
| Egypt | Sharm El Sheikh | 6-8 November | |
| Lithuania | Kaunas | 24-25 November | |
| Germany | Berlin | 12 December | |

== 2023 ==
| Country | Location | Date | Details |
|---|---|---|---|
| Slovakia | Bratislava | 1 January | |
| Vatican Italy | Vatican City Roma | 4-5 January | Participation in the funeral of pope Benedict XVI. See Death and funeral of Pope Benedict XVI. |
| Ukraine | Lviv | 11 January | |
| Switzerland | Davos | 17-19 January | |
| Czech Republic | Náchod | 24 January | |
| Latvia | Riga | 31 January - 2 February | |
| Belgium | Brussels | 16 February | |
| United Kingdom | London | 16-17 February | |
| Germany | Munich | 17-18 February | |
| Qatar | Doha | 4-6 March | |
| United Arab Emirates | Abu Dhabi, Masdar City, Dubai | 6-8 March | |
| Vatican Italy | Vatican City Roma | 3 April | |
| Austria | Vienna | 14 April | |
| Mongolia | Ulaanbaatar | 24-26 April | |
| United Kingdom | London | 5-6 May | Attendance to the Coronation of King Charles III |
| Albania | Tirana | 10-11 May | |
| Iceland | Reykjavík | 16-17 May | |
| United Kingdom | London | 23-24 May | |
| Slovakia | Bratislava | 6 June | |
| France | Paris | 12 June | |
| Netherlands | The Hague | 27 June | |
| Ukraine | Kyiv | 28 June | |
| Lithuania | Vilnius | 5-7 July | |
| Ukraine | Lutsk | 9 July | |
| Lithuania | Vilnius | 11-12 July | Duda attended the NATO summit |
| Romania | Bucharest | 6-7 September | |
| United States | New York | 17-21 September | |
| United States | New York | 30 September - 1 October | |
| Portugal | Porto | 5-6 October | |

== 2024 ==
| Country | Location | Date | Details |
|---|---|---|---|
| United States | Washington, D.C. | 30 March, 1 April | |
| Norway | Oslo, Bodø, Håkvik | 22-25 May | |
| Italy Vatican City | Rome, Vatican City, Naples, Pompei | 3-5 June | |
| Slovenia | Ljubljana | 5-6 June | |
| Latvia | Riga | 11 June | Attended Bucharest Nine summit. |
| Belgium | Brussels | 11-12 July | |
| United States | Washington, D.C. | 9–11 July | Duda attended the NATO summit |
| United States | New York City | 22-26 September | |
| Vatican City | Vatican City | 8-9 November | |
| China | Beijing, Shanghai, Suzhou | 22-27 November | |

== 2025 ==
| Country | Location | Date | Details |
|---|---|---|---|
| Vatican City; Italy | Rome; Vatican City | 26 April | He attended the funeral of Pope Francis. |
| Lithuania | Vilnius | 2 June | Attended Bucharest Nine Summit. |
| Netherlands | Hague | 24–25 June | Attended 2025 The Hague NATO summit. |
| Ukraine | Kyiv | 28 June | |

== Multilateral meetings ==
Multilateral meetings of the following intergovernmental organizations took place during Andrzej Duda's presidency (2015–2025).

| Group | Year | | | | | | | | | | |
| Group | 2015 | 2016 | 2017 | 2018 | 2019 | 2020 | 2021 | 2022 | 2023 | 2024 | 2025 |
|---|---|---|---|---|---|---|---|---|---|---|---|
| NATO | None | 8–9 July, (Poland) Warsaw | 25 May, (Belgium) Brussels | 11–12 July, (Belgium) Brussels | 3–4 December, (United Kingdom) Watford | None | 14 June, (Belgium) Brussels | 24 March, (Belgium) Brussels | 11–12 July, (Lithuania) Vilnius | 9–11 July, (United States) Washington, D.C. | 24–25 June, (Netherlands) The Hague |
| NATO | None | 8–9 July, (Poland) Warsaw | 25 May, (Belgium) Brussels | 11–12 July, (Belgium) Brussels | 3–4 December, (United Kingdom) Watford | None | 14 June, (Belgium) Brussels | 28–30 June, (Spain) Madrid | 11–12 July, (Lithuania) Vilnius | 9–11 July, (United States) Washington, D.C. | 24–25 June, (Netherlands) The Hague |
| Bucharest Nine | 4 November, (Romania) Bucharest | None | None | 8 June, (Poland) Warsaw | 25 February, (Slovakia) Košice | None | 10 May, (Romania) Bucharest | 25 February, (Poland) Warsaw | 22 February, (Poland) Warsaw | 11 June, (Latvia) Riga | 2 June, (Lithuania) Vilnius |
| Bucharest Nine | 4 November, (Romania) Bucharest | None | None | 8 June, (Poland) Warsaw | 25 February, (Slovakia) Košice | None | 10 May, (Romania) Bucharest | 10 June, (Romania) Bucharest | 6 June, (Slovakia) Bratislava | 11 June, (Latvia) Riga | 2 June, (Lithuania) Vilnius |

== See also ==
- Foreign relations of Poland
