= Opinion polling on the Andrzej Duda presidency =

Opinion polling on the presidency of Andrzej Duda

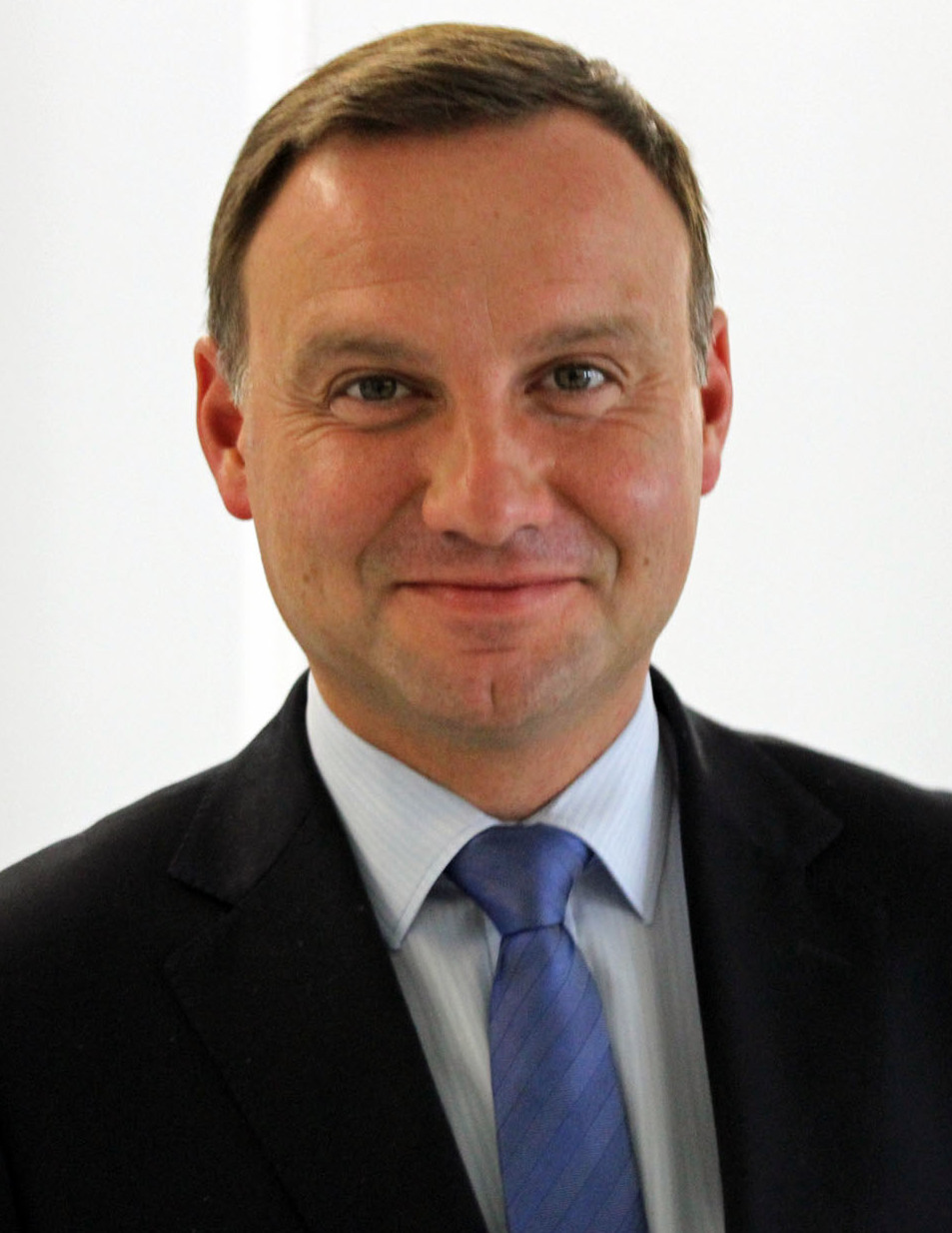
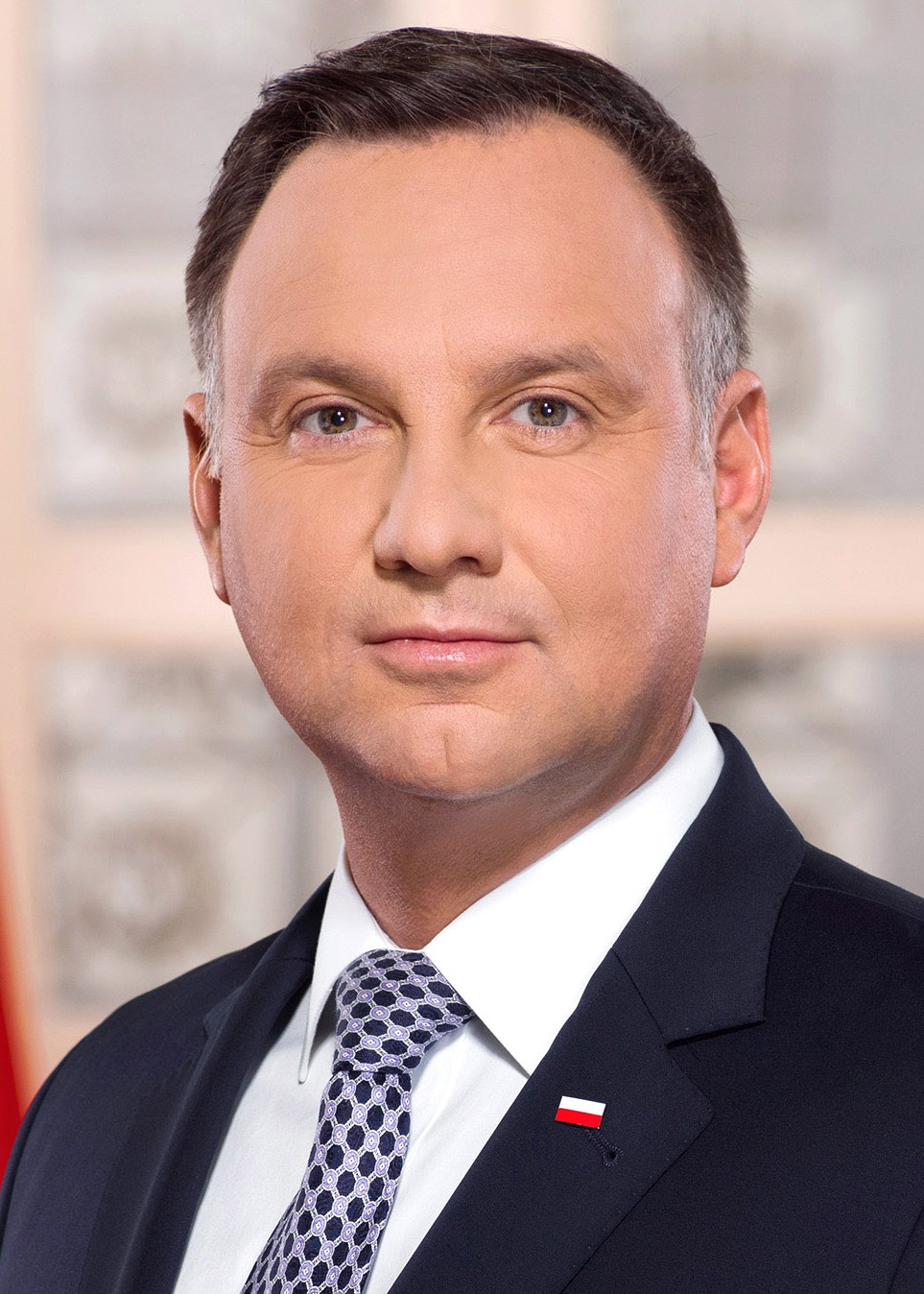
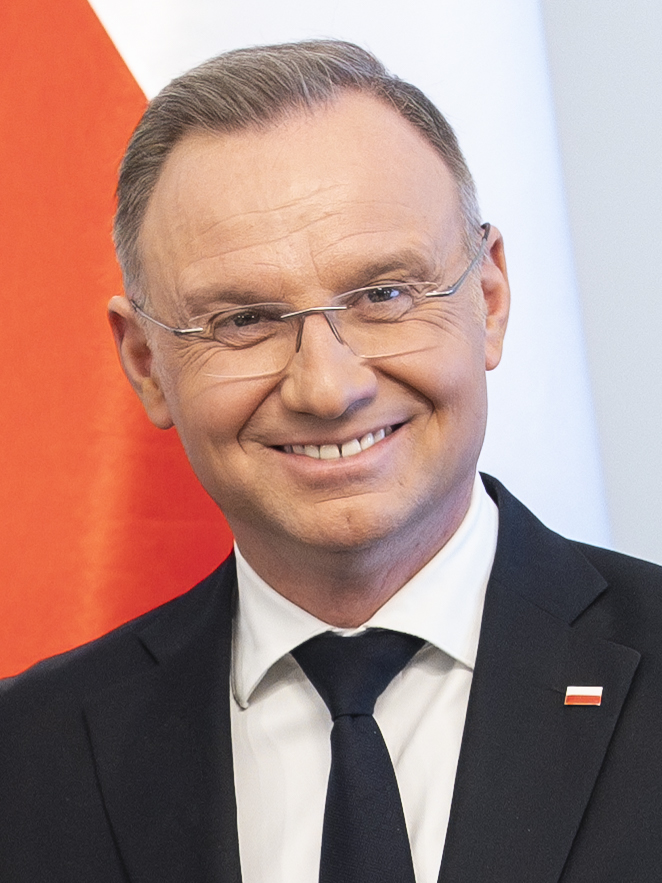
Andrzej Duda in 2013, 2019 and 2025.

Throughout Andrzej Duda’s presidency, numerous research institutions and polling agencies have conducted opinion surveys to gauge public approval of his performance as President of Poland. Duda, a candidate of the conservative Law and Justice party (PiS), first won the presidency on May 24, 2015, defeating incumbent Bronisław Komorowski in a closely contested election. He secured re-election on July 12, 2020, after a polarising campaign against opposition candidate Rafał Trzaskowski.

Duda's approval rating fluctuated throughout his presidency, reflecting his public image and a changing political climate.

== Approval polls ==
=== Approval rating ===
Graphical summary of approval polls

Date(s) conducted	Polling firm/Link	Sample size	Approve	Disapprove	Don't know/Neutral	Net approval
3–13 Jul 2025	CBOS	970	49	44	7	5
5–15 Jun 2025	CBOS	971	48	45	8	3
6–7 Jun 2025	IBRiS / Rz	1,069	49.5	45.4	5.1	4.1
28–29 May 2025	Pollster / "SE.pl"	1,039	44	50	6	-6
5–14 May 2025	CBOS	1,080	46	46	9	Tie
5–8 May 2025	AtlasIntel	5,071	37.1	56.1	6.8	-19
3–13 Apr 2025	CBOS	1,030	39	50	10	–11
6–16 Mar 2025	CBOS	1,047	42	47	9	–5
6–16 Feb 2025	CBOS	972	38	51	10	–13
9–19 Jan 2025	CBOS	972	41	48	11	–7
10–12 Jan 2025	United Surveys / WP.pl	1,000	45.0	48.4	6.6	–3.4
28 Nov–8 Dec 2024	CBOS	915	48	45	7	3
8–21 Nov 2024	CBOS	981	43	46	12	–3
3–13 Oct 2024	CBOS	1,025	43	46	11	–3
12–22 Sep 2024	CBOS	941	44	47	9	–3
14–25 Aug 2024	CBOS	939	43	48	9	–5
4–14 Jul 2024	CBOS	1,076	47	47	6	Tie
10–20 Jun 2024	CBOS	1,055	42	49	9	–7
20 May–2 Jun 2024	CBOS	1,038	42	49	9	–7
8–18 Apr 2024	CBOS	1,079	44	49	7	–5
7–17 Mar 2024	CBOS	1,089	50	39	11	11
8–18 Feb 2024	CBOS	994	40	52		–12
11–21 Jan 2024	CBOS	1,015	43	49	8	–6
28 Nov–12 Dec 2023	CBOS	961	51	43	7	8
3–16 Nov 2023	CBOS	1,072	47	45	7	2
2–11 Oct 2023	CBOS	1,110	50	43	7	7
4–14 Sep 2023	CBOS	1,073	50	42	8	8
14–27 Aug 2023	CBOS	1,024	50	41	9	9
3–16 Jul 2023	CBOS	1,004	43	47	9	–9
7–8 Jul 2023	IBRiS	1,100	39.7	59.6		-19.9
5–18 Jun 2023	CBOS	1,054	44	48	8	–9
9–11 Jun 2023	United Surveys / WP.pl	1,000	34.1	62.3	3.6	–28.2
8–18 May 2023	CBOS	1,056	50	41	9	9
11–20 Apr 2023	CBOS	1,081	49	40	11	9
14–19 Apr 2023	Kantar Public	1,015	35	56	9	–21
17–22 Mar 2023	Kantar Public	981	30	61	9	–31
6–16 Mar 2023	CBOS	993	55	37	8	18
6–19 Feb 2023	CBOS	982	51	39	10	12
9–22 Jan 2023	CBOS	1,028	51	40	9	11
28 Nov–11 Dec 2022	CBOS	1,018	46	46	8	Tie
2–7 Dec 2022	Kantar Public	970	30	62	8	–32
7–17 Nov 2022	CBOS	1,038	50	40	10	10
4–9 Nov 2022	Kantar Public	975	30	60	10	–30
3–13 Oct 2022	CBOS	1,041	46	45	9	1
5–15 Sep 2022	CBOS	1,119	46	44	10	2
14–25 Aug 2022	CBOS	1,043	46	47	7	–1
27 Jun–7 Jul 2022	CBOS	1,084	52	37	11	15
30 May–9 Jun 2022	CBOS	1,050	52	38	10	14
3–8 Jun 2022	Kantar Public	1,012	32	57	11	–15
24–25 May 2022	Pollster	1,062	34	38	28 (Note: Neither – 25)	–4
2–12 May 2022	CBOS	1,087	55	35	10	20
8–13 Apr 2022	Kantar Public	1,008	37	54	9	–27
28 Mar–7 Apr 2022	CBOS	1,030	54	37	9	17
28 Feb–10 Mar 2022	CBOS	1,078	54	38	8	16
11–16 Feb 2022	Kantar Public	1,015	36	57	7	–21
31 Jan–10 Feb 2022	CBOS	1,065	45	43	12	2
21–26 Jan 2022	Kantar Public	1,012	29	62	9	–33
3–13 Jan 2022	CBOS	1,135	42	46	12	–4
29 Nov–12 Dec 2021	CBOS	1,063	42	47	11	–5
26–27 Nov 2021	IBRiS / Onet	1,100	40.9	56.1	3.0	–15.2
18–19 Nov 2021	United Surveys / WP.pl	1,000	43.1	52.3	4.6	–9.2
4–14 Nov 2021	CBOS	1,100	42	46	12	–4
4–14 Oct 2021	CBOS	1,161	46	43	11	3
8–12 Oct 2021	Kantar Public	1,002	30	59	11	–29
26 Sep 2021	Pollster / SE.pl		34	58	8	–24
24–25 Sep 2021	IBRiS / "RZ"	1,100	45.0	47.7	7.3	–2.7
6–16 Sep 2021	CBOS	1,218	47	44	9	4
3–8 Sep 2021	Kantar Public	1,008	35	57	8	–22
16–26 Aug 2021	CBOS	1,167	44	46	10	–2
9–14 Jul 2021	Kantar Public	1,004	31	61	8	–30
7–17 Jun 2021	CBOS	1,218	46	43	11	3
11–15 Jun 2021	Kantar Public	1,011	34	56	10	–22
6–16 May 2021	CBOS	1,163	45	44	11	1
7–12 May 2021	Kantar Public	1,005	36	55	9	–19
8–18 Apr 2021	CBOS	1,131	44	46	10	–2
9–14 Apr 2021	Kantar Public	1,006	31	62	7	–31
1–11 Mar 2021	CBOS	1,154	42	49	9	–7
5–10 Mar 2021	Kantar Public	1,014	31	60	9	–29
5 Mar 2021	United Surveys	1,000	29.9	60.6	9.5	–30.7
1–11 Feb 2021	CBOS	1,179	43	48	9	–5
29 Jan–3 Feb 2021	Kantar Public	1,011	32	59	9	–27
4–14 Jan 2021	CBOS	1,150	43	47	10	–4
30 Nov–10 Dec 2020	CBOS	1,010	44	45	11	–1
4–9 Dec 2020	Kantar Public	1,015	32	58	10	–26
5–15 Nov 2020	CBOS	1,052	41	52	7	–11
6–12 Nov 2020	Kantar Public	1,010	32	59	9	–27
19–29 Oct 2020	CBOS	1,040	42	49	9	–7
28 Sep–8 Oct 2020	CBOS	1,133	55	37	8	18
2–7 Oct 2020	Kantar Public	1,012	38	52	10	–14
18–27 Aug 2020	CBOS	1,149	56	38	6	18
30 Jun–9 Jul 2020	CBOS	1,339	53	40	7	13
5–10 Jun 2020	Kantar Public	1,012	40	50	10	-10
22 May–4 Jun 2020	CBOS	1,308	55	39	6	16
18–19 May 2020	Kantar Public	1,000	44	53	3	-9
16–17 Apr 2020	Kantar Public	1,000	44	52	4	-8
5–15 Mar 2020	CBOS	919	58	37	5	21
6–11 Mar 2020	Kantar Public	1,007	45	44	11	1
6–16 Feb 2020	CBOS	994	57	36	7	21
7–12 Feb 2020	CBOS	1,006	45	42	13	3
9–16 Jan 2020	CBOS	1,069	60	31	9	29
10–15 Jan 2020	Kantar Public	1,015	47	42	11	5
6–11 Dec 2019	Kantar Public	1,002	50	40	10	10
28 Nov–5 Dec 2019	CBOS	971	63	29	8	34
15–20 Nov 2019	Kantar Public	1,006	49	38	13	11
7–17 Nov 2019	CBOS	996	65	29	6	36
18–23 Oct 2019	Kantar Public	1,008	49	38	13	11
3–10 Oct 2019	CBOS	1,013	62	29	9	33
12–19 Sep 2019	CBOS	990	62	28	10	34
6–11 Sep 2019	Kantar Public	1,004	48	40	12	8
22–29 Aug 2019	CBOS	1,029	61	30	9	31
12–17 Aug 2019	Kantar Public	1,011	48	40	12	8
2–6 Aug 2019	Ariadna / WP.pl	1,056	38	41	21	–3
12–17 Jul 2019	Kantar Public	1,010	48	37	15	11
4–11 Jul 2019	CBOS	1,120	58	31	11	27
14–19 Jun 2019	Kantar Public	1,005	47	42	11	5
6–13 Jun 2019	CBOS	1,115	60	29	11	31
16–23 May 2019	CBOS	1,138	60	29	11	31
10–15 May 2019	Kantar Public	1,005	48	41	11	7
4–11 Apr 2019	CBOS	1,125	60	30	10	30
5–10 Apr 2019	Kantar Public	1,014	46	43	11	3
7–14 Mar 2019	CBOS	1,019	61	30	9	31
8–13 Mar 2019	Kantar Public	1,015	49	39	12	10
7–14 Feb 2019	CBOS	1,019	56	34	10	22
8–13 Feb 2019	Kantar Public	1,015	44	43	13	1
10–17 Jan 2019	CBOS	986	59	34	7	25
11–16 Jan 2019	Kantar Public	1,015	44	43	13	1
30 Nov–11 Dec 2018	Kantar Public	1,058	49	39	12	10
29 Nov–9 Dec 2018	CBOS	1,016	57	32	11	25
8–15 Nov 2018	CBOS	1,051	60	30	10	30
9–15 Nov 2018	Kantar Public	1,061	52	37	11	15
12–17 Oct 2018	Kantar Public	1,067	49	39	12	10
4–11 Oct 2018	CBOS	1,079	59	31	10	28
6–13 Sep 2018	CBOS	1,064	58	30	12	28
10–16 Sep 2018	Kantar Public	1,054	48	38	14	10
16–23 Aug 2018	CBOS	1,115	58	31	11	27
10–16 Aug 2018	Kantar Public	1,061	47	42	11	5
6–11 Jul 2018	Kantar Public	1,043	47	41	12	6
28 Jun–5 Jul 2018	CBOS	999	60	28	12	32
8–17 Jun 2018	Kantar Public	1,050	49	38	13	11
7–14 Jun 2018	CBOS	1,029	63	27	10	36
10–17 May 2018	CBOS	1,170	62	26	12	36
11–16 May 2018	Kantar Public	1,062	48	37	15	11
5–12 Apr 2018	CBOS	1,140	63	28	9	35
6–11 Apr 2018	Kantar Public	1,058	54	34	12	20
9–14 Mar 2018	Kantar Public	1,060	49	38	13	11
1–8 Mar 2018	CBOS	1,092	60	28	12	32
16–21 Feb 2018	Kantar Public	1,066	52	34	14	18
1–8 Feb 2018	CBOS	1,057	65	26	9	39
9–17 Jan 2018	CBOS	951	66	27	7	39
12–17 Jan 2018	Kantar Public	1,051	53	32	15	21
1–7 Dec 2017	CBOS	925	64	27	9	37
1–6 Dec 2017	Kantar Public	1,059	53	35	12	18
2–12 Nov 2017	CBOS	1,016	62	29	9	33
3–8 Nov 2017	Kantar Public	1,064	52	35	13	17
5–12 Oct 2017	CBOS	948	68	24	8	44
6–11 Oct 2017	Kantar Public	1,056	54	32	14	22
7–14 Sep 2017	CBOS	985	68	25	7	43
7–8 Sep 2017	IBRiS / Rz	1,100	56.6	38.3	5.1	18.3
1–6 Sep 2017	Kantar Public	1,060	56	34	10	22
17–24 Aug 2017	CBOS	1,009	65	28	7	37
4–9 Aug 2017	Kantar Public	1,063	54	36	10	18
7–12 Jul 2017	Kantar Public	1,063	51	39	10	12
29 Jun–6 Jul 2017	CBOS	977	55	35	10	20
1–8 Jun 2017	CBOS	1,020	54	34	12	20
2–7 Jun 2017	Kantar Public	1,055	48	41	11	7
19–22 May 2017	Ariadna / WP.pl	1,067	39	42	19	-3
12–17 May 2017	Kantar Public	1,047	48	41	11	7
5–14 May 2017	CBOS	1,034	53	38	9	15
30 Mar–6 Apr 2017	CBOS	1,075	56	35	9	21
2–9 Mar 2017	CBOS	1,020	51	38	11	3
3–8 Mar 2017	Kantar Public	1,059	44	45	11	-1
Mar 2017	IBRiS / Rz		39.7	56.2	3.8	–16.5
17–22 Feb 2017	Kantar Public	1,050	46	44	10	2
2–9 Feb 2017	CBOS	1,016	54	37	9	17
13–18 Jan 2017	Kantar Public	1,063	47	44	9	3
7–15 Jan 2017	CBOS	1,045	52	39	9	13
1–11 Dec 2016	CBOS	1,136	53	38	9	15
2–7 Dec 2016	Kantar Public	1,051	46	44	10	2
12–17 Nov 2016	Kantar Public	1,066	50	41	9	9
4–13 Nov 2016	CBOS	1,019	53	36	11	17
8–19 Oct 2016	CBOS	937	56	34	10	22
7–12 Oct 2016	Kantar Public	1,052	48	41	11	7
8–15 Sep 2016	CBOS	981	53	37	10	16
9–14 Sep 2016	Kantar Public	1,059	51	39	10	12
17–25 Aug 2016	CBOS	1,033	54	34	12	20
5–10 Aug 2016	Kantar Public	1,059	48	42	10	6
30 Jun–7 Jul 2016	CBOS	983	56	32	12	24
1–6 Jul 2016	Kantar Public	1,022	44	44	12	Tie
2–9 June 2016	CBOS	1,002	55	36	9	19
3–8 June 2016	Kantar Public	1,027	47	41	12	6
13–18 May 2016	Kantar Public	1,009	43	47	10	-4
5–12 May 2016	CBOS	1,100	50	39	11	11
15–19 Apr 2016	Ariadna	1,044	47	40	13	7
8–13 Apr 2016	Kantar Public	1,015	46	42	12	4
31 Mar–7 Apr 2016	CBOS	1,104	49	37	14	12
1–5 Apr 2016	Ariadna	1,020	47	41	12	6
2–9 Mar 2016	CBOS	1,034	51	37	12	14
4–9 Mar 2016	Kantar Public	1,011	48	38	14	10
3–10 Feb 2016	CBOS	1,000	47	38	15	9
5–10 Feb 2016	Kantar Public	1,002	44	41	15	3
7–14 Jan 2016	CBOS	1,063	47	38	15	9
3–10 Dec 2015	CBOS	989	43	40	17	3
4–9 Dec 2015	Kantar Public	1,003	47	36	17	11
27–28 Nov 2015	IBRiS / Onet	1,100	42	48	8	–6
6–12 Nov 2015	Kantar Public	1,027	42	32	26	10
25 Nov 2015	Ariadna	1,108	43	29	28	14
5–11 Nov 2015	CBOS	951	42	20	38	22
15–21 Oct 2015	CBOS	1,114	42	22	36	20
2–7 Oct 2015	Kantar Public	1,001	41	29	30	12
17–23 Sep 2015	CBOS	972	39	25	36	14
4–9 Sep 2015	Kantar Public	1,017	36	29	35	7
17–24 Aug 2015	CBOS	1,040	33	15	52	18

In a post-presidency poll by Europion Polska conducted on 25–27 August 2026, 32% rated Duda's presidency "neither good nor bad", 25% rated it positively, 30% disapproved and 13% had no opinion.

== Election matchups ==
Polling firm/Link	Fieldwork date	Sample size	Duda Ind. (PiS)	Kaczyński PiS	Morawiecki PiS	Szydło PiS	Ziobro PiS	Tusk PO	Komorowski PO	Schetyna PO	Kopacz PO	Petru.N	Kukiz K15	Kosiniak-Kamysz PSL	Korwin-Mikke KORWiN	Cimoszewicz SLD	Czarzasty SLD	Kwaśniewski (Note: Ineligible for a third term) Ind. (SLD)	Biedroń TR	Zandberg Razem	Don't know	Abstain	Lead
Pollster / "SE.pl"	Sep 2017		47	—	—	—	—	53	—	—	—	—	—	—	—	—	—	—	—	—			3
Pollster / "SE.pl"	Sep 2017		66	6	16	8	4	—	—	—	—	—	—	—	—	—	—	—	—	—			50
Pollster / "SE.pl"	16–17 Aug 2017	1,099	39	—	—	6	—	31	—	1	—	2	7	3	5	—	3	—	—	3			8
Pollster / "SE.pl"	2–3 Jan 2017	1,047	41.23	—	—	—	—	11.55	3.96	0.24	0.17	7.86	7.36	—	3.93	—	2.7	3.4	2.62	—			29.68

== See also ==
- 2015 Polish presidential election
- 2020 Polish presidential election
