= Latgyprogorstroy =

Latvian SSR housing institute

Coordinates: 56°57′34″N 24°07′10″E

"Latgyprogorstoy" (Russian: Институт "Латгипрогорстрой") or Pilsētprojekts was the main institute of designing apartment houses in Latvian SSR.

Full name of the institute was Latvian State Institute of Designing State Construction (Russian: Латвийский государственный институт проектирования государственного строительства). Founded in 1951, the institute took part in construction of the most modern Riga, Liepāja and Daugavpils neighbourhoods. Not artistic, with a big number of defects, these houses served the main purpose - to give Latvia a big number of cheap living space. Most of the Latgyprogorstroy's projects were standard and had a number consisting of three figures.

Houses built under the projects of the institute has a big safety factor and still are the main living fund of Latvian cities. Beside the projects of apartment houses the institute designed the projects of schools, kindergartens, water pipe and sewerage networks. Latgyprogorstroy also took part in the construction of the city Slavutych - the new living place for the victims of Chernobyl Nuclear Power Plant accident.

The main office building of the Latgyprogorstoy was located in Riga at Gorky St. 38 (now Krišjāņa Valdemāra iela 38). The institute also had the branches in Liepāja and Daugavpils. The institute ceased its existence in 1990. On the base of the institute was founded public limited company Pilsētprojekts.

== Staff ==
- Viktors Valgums
- Modris Ģelzis
- Normunds Pavārs
- Zane Kalinka
- Andris Kokins
