= Cross of Recognition =

Latvian award

Cross of Recognition Atzinības krusts
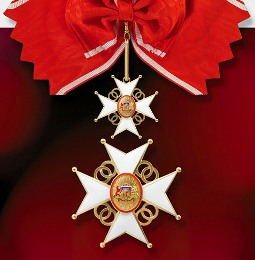
- Grand Cross of the Cross of Recognition
- Type: 5 class Order, with honor medals in 5 grades.
- Awarded for: Special services in public, cultural, science, sports and education.
- Presented by: Latvia
- Motto: Pour les honnêtes gens (For people of honour)
- Established: 1710; Reestablished 1938; Revived 2004
- Ribbon bar of the cross

Precedence
- Next (higher): Order of Viesturs
- Next (lower): Medal of Honour of the Order of Three Stars

The Cross of Recognition (Latvian: Atzinības krusts) is a state decoration of Latvia.

== History ==
The decoration was established in 1710 in the Duchy of Courland and Semigallia by Duke Frederick William as a symbol of the then-established Order of Recognition (l’Ordre de la Reconnaissance). According to the order's statute, it was established “in thanks to God Almighty for the recovery of Courland after the Great Northern War” (“et in memoriam recuperatae Curlandiae”). The order was bestowed for outstanding civilian and military accomplishments. Frederick William died in January 1711. No more than 18 people were awarded the order and its cross by then. After his death, no further orders were presented.

The Cross of Recognition was reestablished by the Republic of Latvia in 1938. Five classes of the order and three medals of honour were introduced, as well as a separate first level for the medal.

With the beginning of the Soviet occupation of Latvia, the bestowing of the order was halted.

After the restoration of the independence of Latvia, the decoration was restored again as the Cross of Recognition in 2004. It is awarded to Latvians and foreigners for special services in public, cultural, science, sports and education.

== Ranks ==
The Cross of Recognition is awarded in the five classes:

1. Commander of the Great Cross: Cross is worn suspended from a sash worn over the shoulder with a breast star
2. Grand Officer: Cross is worn suspended from the neck with a breast star
3. Commander: Cross is worn suspended from the neck
4. Officer: Cross is worn suspended from a ribbon with rosette worn on the chest
5. Bearer: Cross is worn suspended from a ribbon worn on the chest.

In addition, honorary medals are issued at three levels:

1. Gilded Medal
2. Silver Medal
3. Bronze Medal

1st class	1st class dames	2nd class	2nd class dames
3rd class	3rd class dames	4th and 5th class	Ribbon bars
