= Petrovs =

Petrovs is a Latvian surname. Notable people with the surname include:

- Kaspars Petrovs (born 1978), Latvian serial killer
- Vladimirs Petrovs (1908–1943), Latvian-Russian chess player
