= Daugavpils Prison =

Prison in Latvia

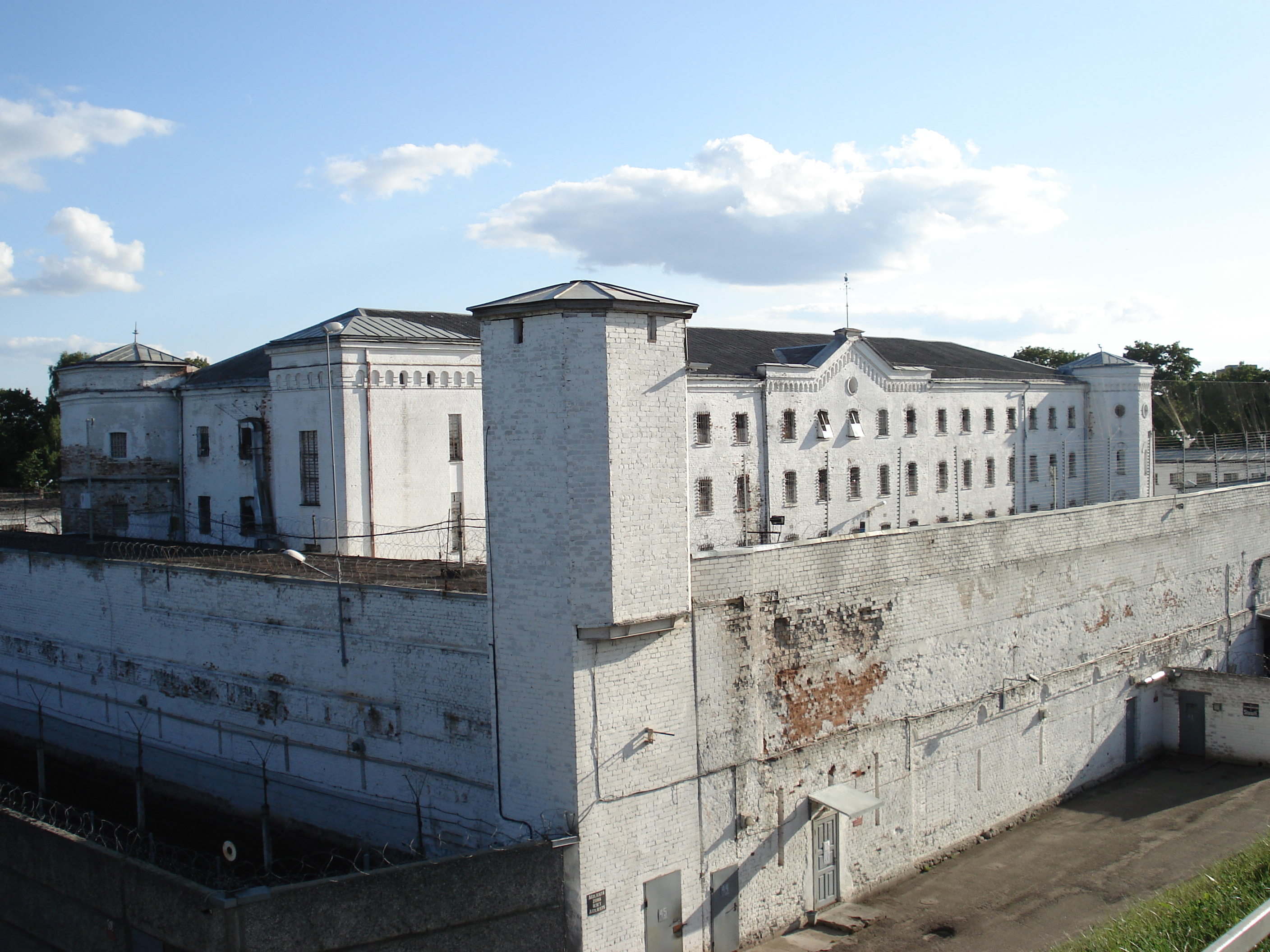
The “White Swan” prison in Daugavpils

Daugavpils Prison, colloquially known as “The White Swan”, is a prison in Latvia, located in the central part of the city of Daugavpils in Gajok at: 18 November Street, 66A. It is an architectural monument of local significance and is protected by the state.

== History ==
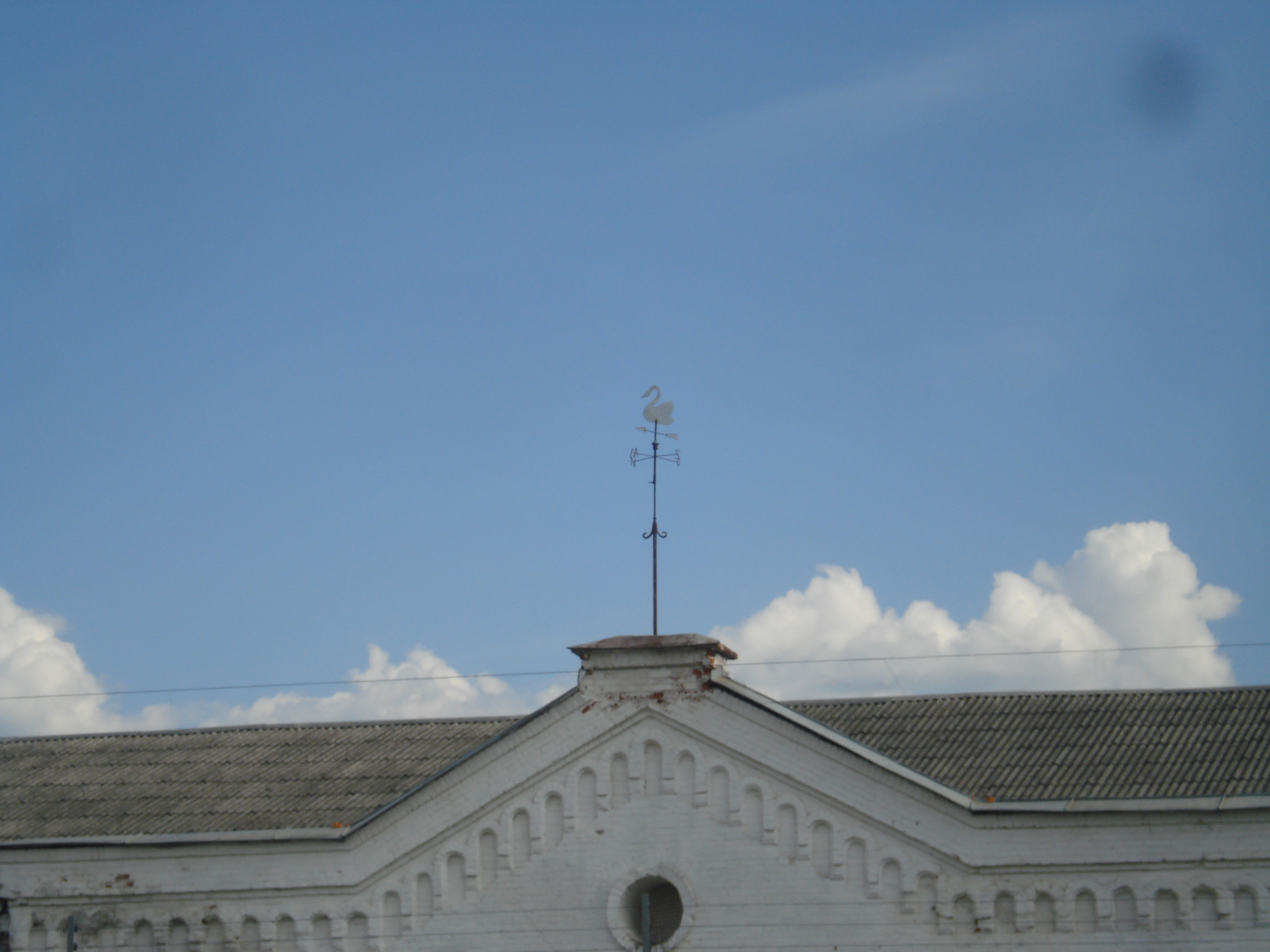
Weather vane

The prison was built in 1863 on the outskirts of the city. Initially, the façade of the prison building was red, and it was known as the “Red House”. According to documents from the prison archive, the architect of the building was its first inmate. Today the prison is a whitewashed ostrog fortress, surrounded by solid walls with watchtowers at the corners. The building is topped with a weather vane shaped like a white swan. This combination of white walls and a swan-shaped weather vane gave the prison its name.

== Present day ==
“The White Swan” is the only prison in Latvia where the watchtowers have no guards. In addition to the armed security patrolling the prison grounds, surveillance of inmates is carried out through electronic equipment.

The “White Swan” currently holds the serial killer Kaspars Petrovs, accused of murdering 38 elderly women, 13 of which were proven in court.

In 2008 the “White Swan” prison was merged with the Grīva Prison (also located in Daugavpils) in order to reduce administrative costs. The combined prison received a new name — Daugavgrīva.
