= Daugavpils =

State city of Latvia in Latgale and Selonia, capital of Augšdaugava Municipality

- State city
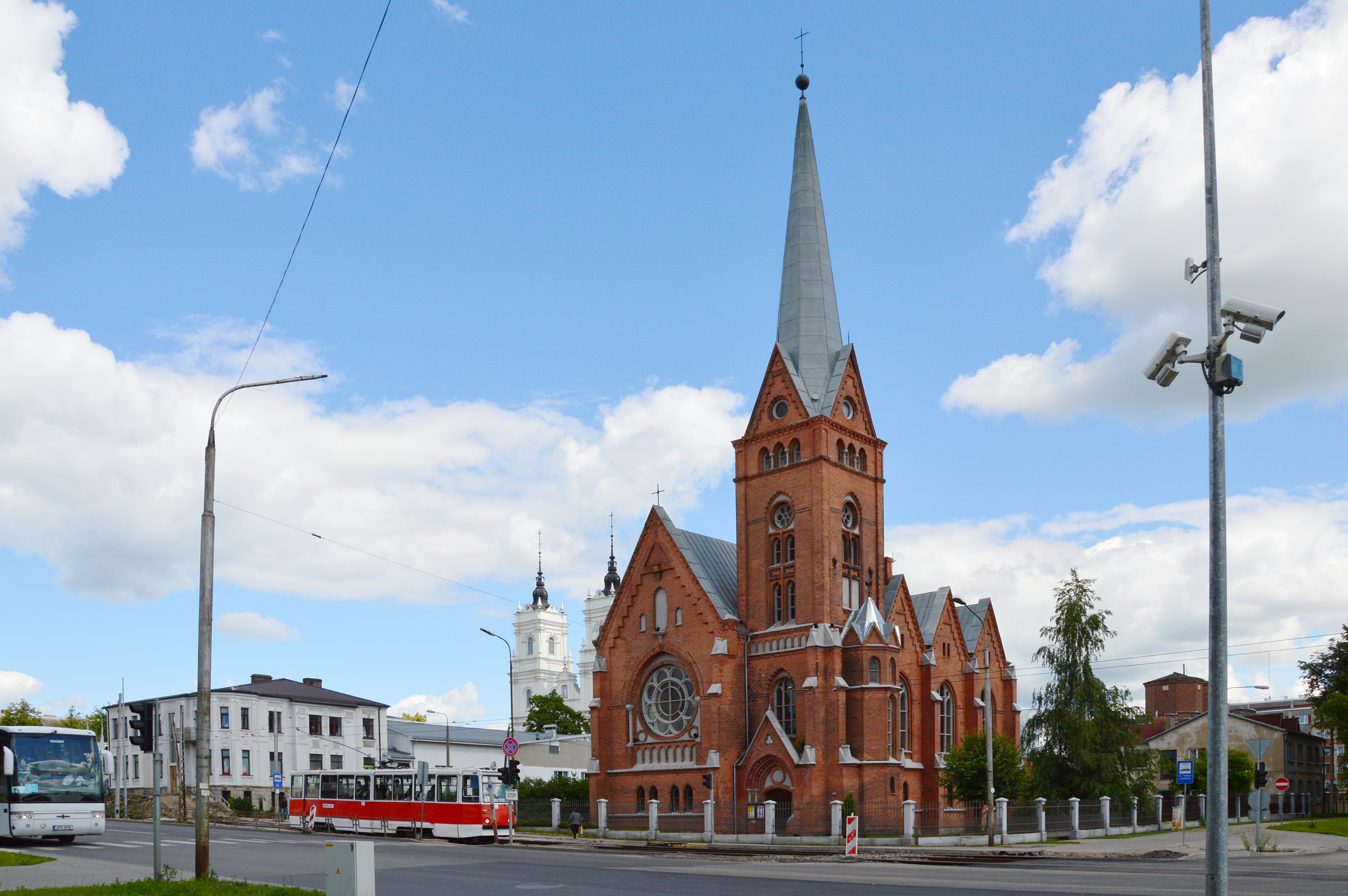
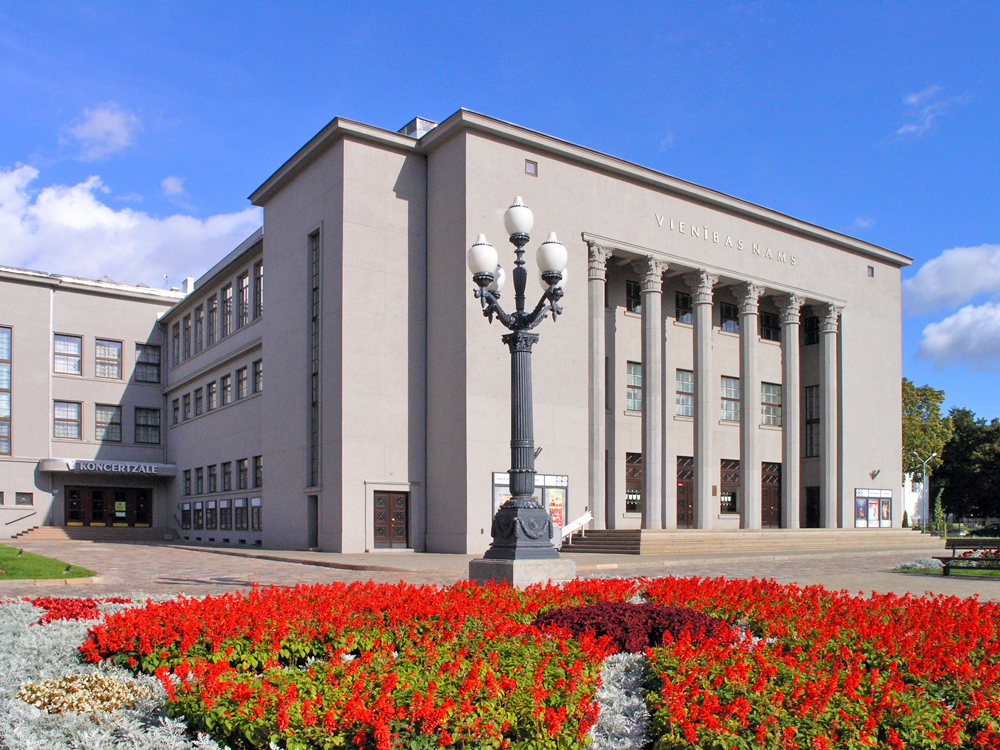
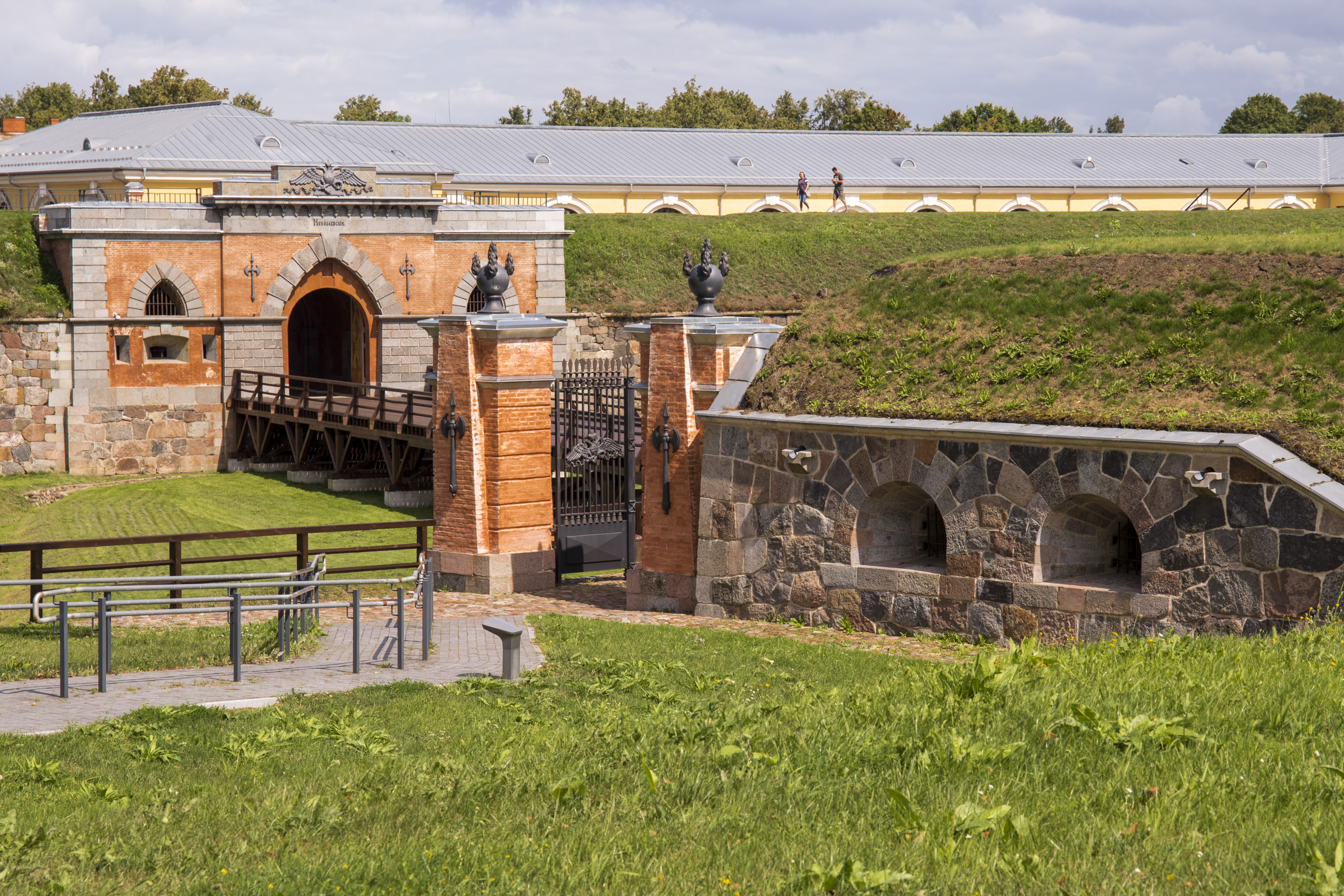
- Lutheran Church with Catholic Church in background Daugavpils Theatre Daugavpils Fortress

- Flag Coat of arms

- Location within Latvia
- Coordinates: 55°52′30″N 26°32′8″E
- Country: Latvia
- Established: 1275
- Town rights: 1582

Government
  - Mayor: Andrejs Elksniņš (Go, Latgale!)
  - Number of city council members: 15

Area
  - Total: 72.37 km^{2} (27.94 sq mi)
  - Land: 63.56 km^{2} (24.54 sq mi)
  - Water: 8.81 km^{2} (3.40 sq mi)
- Highest elevation: 139 m (456 ft)
- Lowest elevation: 86 m (282 ft)

Population (2026)
  - Total: 77,486
  - Rank: 2
  - Density: 1,219/km^{2} (3,157/sq mi)
- Demonym: Daugavpilieši (Latvian)

GDP
  - State city: 857,673,000 euro (2021)
  - Per capita: 10,746 euro (2021)
- Time zone: UTC+2 (EET)
  - Summer (DST): UTC+3 (EEST)
- Postal code: LV-54(01–65)
- Calling code: (+371) 654
- Climate: Dfb
- Website: www.daugavpils.lv

Daugavpils (see also other names) is a state city in southeastern Latvia, located on the banks of the Daugava River, from which the city derives its name. The parts of the city to the north of the river belong to the historical Latvian region of Latgale, and those to the south lie in Selonia. It is the second-largest city in the country after the capital Riga, which is located some 230 kilometres (143 miles) northwest and is the ninth most populous city in the Baltic states. In addition to being a state city with its own municipality, the administration of the surrounding Augšdaugava Municipality is located in Daugavpils as well.

Daugavpils is located relatively close to Belarus and Lithuania (distances of 33 km (21 mi) and 25 km (16 mi), respectively), and some 120 km (75 mi) from the Latvian border with Russia. Daugavpils is a major railway junction and industrial centre, and was an historically important garrison city lying approximately midway between Riga and Minsk, and between Warsaw and Saint Petersburg.

Daugavpils, then called Dyneburg, was the capital of Polish Livonia while in Polish–Lithuanian Commonwealth. Following the first partition of Poland in 1772, the city became part of the Russian Empire. Since the Second World War, it has maintained an overwhelmingly Russian-speaking population, with Latvians and Poles being significant minorities. Historically, German and Yiddish were additional prominent native languages.

== Names ==
In the Latvian language, the current name Daugavpils (Latvian pronunciation: [ˈdauɡaupils]) references Daugava and the Latvian word pils (meaning "castle" - cognate with Lithuanian pilis, with Greek polis and with Old Prussian pils).

Historically, several names in various languages have identified Daugavpils. Some are still in use today.

- Belarusian: Даўґаўпілс (Daŭgaŭpils); historically Дзвінск (Dzvinsk), (Note: In Taraškievica it is spelled Дзьвінск (Dźvinsk),) Дынабурґ (Dynaburg)
- German: Dünaburg (German pronunciation: [ˈdyːnaˌbʊʁk])
- Estonian: Dünaburg, Väinalinn
- Finnish: Väinänlinna
- French: Dunebourg, Dimmebourg
- Latgalian: Daugovpiļs, [ˈdaʊgoupʲilʲs]
- Lithuanian: Daugpilis
- Polish: Dyneburg [dɘˈnɛburk], sometimes Polish: Dźwińsk
- Russian: Даугавпилс (Daugavpils) [ˈdaʊɡəfpʲɪɫs]; historically: Невгин (Nevgin), Динабург (Dinaburg), Борисогле́бов (Borisoglebov), Двинск (Dvinsk)
- Yiddish: דענענבורג (Denenburg), דינאַבורג (Dinaburg), דווינסק (Dvinsk)

=== Chronology of name changes ===
- Dünaburg (1275–1656)
- Borisoglebov (1656–1667)
- Dinaburg (1667–1893)
- Dvinsk (1893–1920)
- Daugavpils (since 1920)

== History ==
The town's history began in 1273 when the Livonian Order, led by Ernst von Ratzeburg, built the Dünaburg Castle on the site of a Lithuanian settlement of Naujinis (about 18 km from present-day Daugavpils). Between 1281 and 1313, Lithuania ruled Daugavpils, the lands up to Daugava and its surroundings. In 1561 it again became part of the Grand Duchy of Lithuania and, subsequently, of the Polish–Lithuanian Commonwealth in 1569 (see Duchy of Livonia). In 1621 Daugavpils became the capital of the newly formed Inflanty Voivodeship, which existed until the First Partition of Poland (1772). In 1577 the Russian tsar Ivan the Terrible captured and destroyed Dünaburg castle.

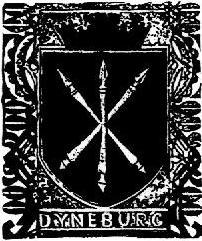
Coat of arms of Daugavpils (then "Dyneburg") in 1582

That same year, a new castle and a town were built 20 km (12 mi) downriver, by the Polish King and the Grand Duke of Lithuania Stephen Báthory. In 1582 Daugavpils was granted Magdeburg town rights. In 1654, Russia invaded Polish-Lithuanian Commonwealth, seizing much of the eastern lands. Russian troops besieged Daugavpils in April and May 1655, but did not capture the city; it was only taken by Swedish troops on July 11, 1655, who invaded Poland at that time. When the Russo-Swedish war started, the Russians captured Daugavpils on 10 August 1656, renamed the town Borisoglebov and controlled the region for 11 years, between 1656 and 1667. Russia returned the area of Latgale to Polish–Lithuanian Commonwealth following the Treaty of Andrusovo (1667). Called Dyneburg, the city became the capital of the Inflanty Voivodeship, also known as the Duchy of Livonia, and the starostwo of Dyneburg. It was a place of local sejmik's gatherings. Roman Catholic Bishop of Inflanty, who was always residing outside of diocese, moved his seat to Dyneburg at the end of 17th century. At the end of the 18th century, 540 people lived in the city itself, but counting the population of the suburbs the number was 1,373.

It became part of the Russian Empire after the First Partition of Poland in 1772. It was the uyezd administrative center as part of the Pskov Governorate (1772–1776), Polotsk (1776–1796), Belarusian (1796–1802), and finally Vitebsk (1802–1917), first as Dinaburg, then Dvinsk later during Russian rule.

From 1784 onwards, the city had a large and active Jewish population, among them a number of prominent figures. According to the Russian census of 1897, out of a total population of 69,700, Jews numbered 32,400 (ca. 44% percent). The construction of the Daugavpils fortress began in 1810 and was completed in 1878. The new centre of the city was built southeast of the fortress in the 19th century according to the project endorsed in St. Petersburg in 1826. The city was located on the Saint Petersburg-Warsaw railway line, to which it was connected in 1860. As part of the Russian Empire, the city was called Dvinsk from 1893 to 1920.

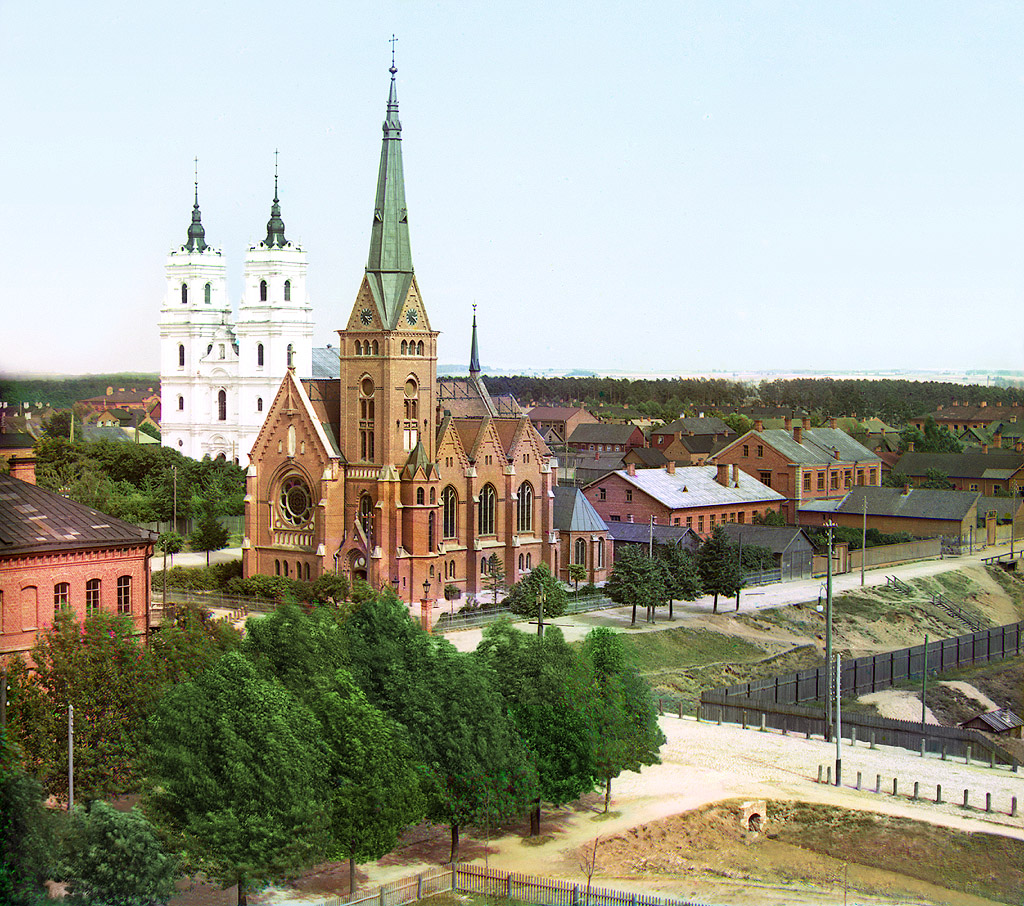
A 1912 photo by Prokudin-Gorsky

During the Lithuanian Independence Wars, there were Lithuanian attempts to take Daugavpils (Dvinsk) due to a Lithuanian minority living there and the city's importance as a rail and road junction. However, Lithuania never made a full-scale military campaign to annex the city or directly control it. The newly independent Latvian state renamed it Daugavpils in 1920. Latvians, Poles and Soviet troops fought the Battle of Daugavpils in the area from 1919 to 1920.

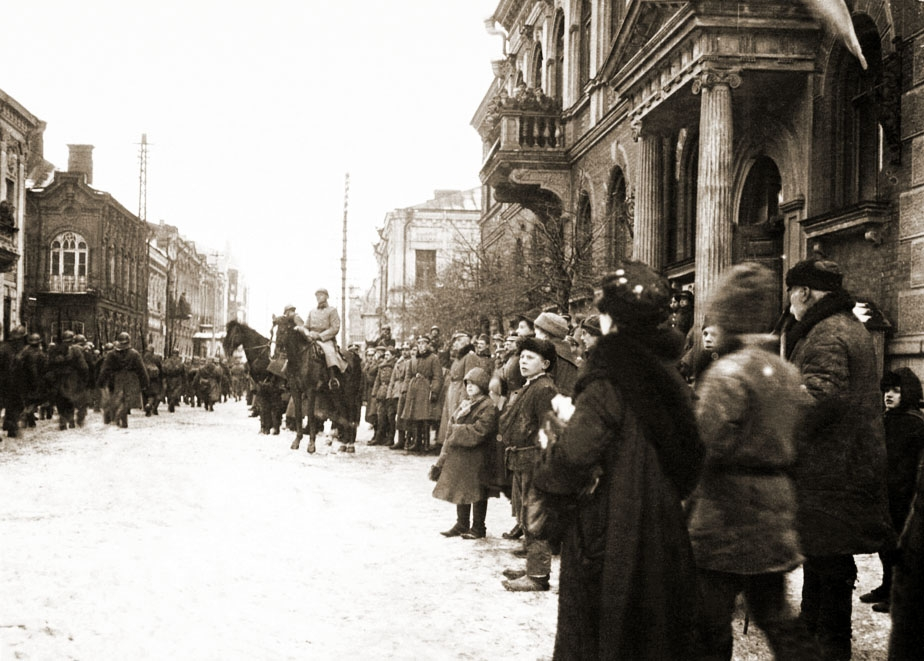
Polish 5th Legions' Infantry Regiment in Daugavpils in 1920

Daugavpils and the whole of Latvia was under Soviet rule between 1940–41 and 1944–1991. Nazi Brandenburgers led the German attack against the town in 1941, speaking Russian and wearing Soviet uniforms, and Germany occupied it between 1941 and 1944. The Nazis established the Daugavpils Ghetto where the town's Jews were forced to live. Most were murdered. During the Cold War the Lociki air-base operated 12 km (7 mi) northeast of Daugavpils itself. In the late Soviet era, there was a proposal to build a hydroelectric power station on the Daugava river that was successfully opposed by the nascent environmental movement in Latvia.

On 16 April 2010 an assassin shot vice-mayor Grigorijs Ņemcovs in the center of the city. He died almost immediately and the crime remains unsolved.

=== Jewish history ===
Prior to 1941, Daugavpils, called Dvinsk by its Jewish inhabitants, was home to the most prominent Jewish community in eastern Latvia. The city was already a Jewish center as early as the 1780s and by the time of the 1897 census, they numbered 32,400 (44% of the overall population of the city). The Jews of the town were very prosperous and ran 32 factories and there were 4000 artisans among them. By 1911 they had increased to 50,000. However, tens of thousands of Jews migrated away from Daugavpils; in the last census taken prior to the Second World War, in 1935, the Jewish population of Daugavpils numbered only 11,106 (24.6% of the overall population of the city).

The city not only boasted a large Jewish population but a rich religious culture including 40 synagogues. The city was home to two of the most prominent rabbis of their time: Joseph Rosen (1858–1936), known as the Rogatchover Gaon (genius from Rahachow), was famed for his commentaries on the works of Maimonides and on the Talmud. Famed for his acidic wit and penetrating genius, he led the towns Hasidic Jews. His 'competitor', the leader of the local Misnagdim (non-Hasidic Jews) was the Rabbi Meir Simcha of Dvinsk (1843–1926). Rabbi Meir Simcha was also renowned for his work on Maimonides (Or Somayach) as well as Bible commentary Meshech Chochma. In one famous comment he predicted that since some Jews had assimilated and viewed Berlin as their 'Jerusalem' they would suffer persecution originating in Berlin.

Sarah Azariahu was born here in 1873. She was a leading figure in establishing equal rights for women in pre-state Israel. Another famous Jewish resident, moving in a very different direction, was the abstract expressionist painter Mark Rothko. Born in Daugavpils in 1903 he immigrated at the age of 10 to the United States where he painted over 800 paintings in his unique style.

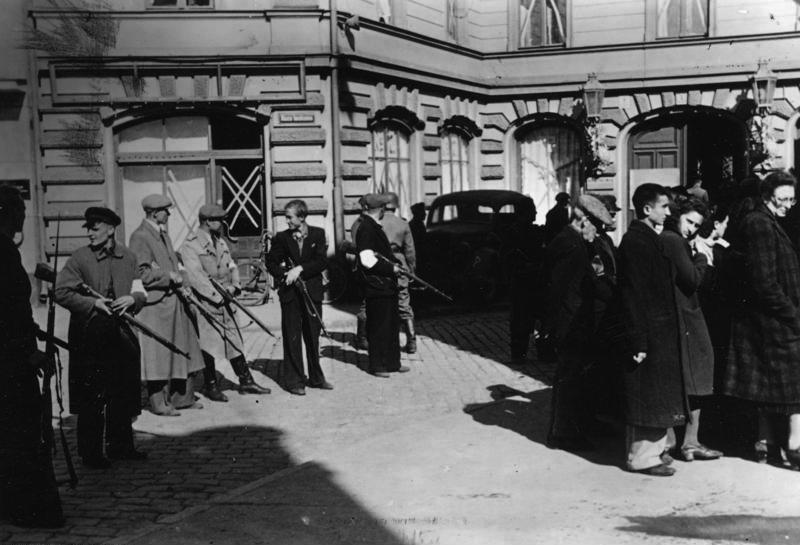
Daugavpils Ghetto in July 1941

Rothko and many of his fellow Jews would have taken the train from Daugavpils to Liepāja, travelling westwards from Radviliškis on the Libau-Romny Railway, and would have crossed the seas by one of the steamships departing for New York via a regular service established in 1906 by the Russian American Line.

Jewish Daugavpils, a 16,000 strong community, already greatly diminished by emigration, came to an end following the Nazi German invasion on 26 June 1941. Falsely claiming that the Jews had conspired to set fire to the town and that they were assisting the Soviet army, the Germans and their Latvian collaborators carried out large executions on 28–29 June. During July the Jews were enslaved and forced to cut down timber. On 7–11 July Einsatzkommando 1b under Erich Ehrlinger executed many of the remaining Jews. Later in July the 14,000 remaining Jews were forced into a Ghetto along with those from nearby towns. By the end of August an additional 7000 Jews had died at the hands of the Nazis and the local Latvian collaborators. The largest execution took place in November 1941 and was followed by plagues that decimated the few survivors. Only about 1500 Jews remained in the city. These were murdered on 1 May 1942. When the town was liberated in 1944 only 100 survivors remained of a community of 16,000. For more on the Holocaust in Daugavpils see Daugavpils Ghetto.

== Geography ==
=== Climate ===
Under the Köppen climate classification, Daugavpils features a humid continental climate (Dfb), with warm summers and cold winters.

Climate data for Daugavpils (1991−2020 normals, extremes 1891−present)
Month	Jan	Feb	Mar	Apr	May	Jun	Jul	Aug	Sep	Oct	Nov	Dec	Year
Record high °C (°F)	11.1 (52.0)	13.1 (55.6)	18.4 (65.1)	27.9 (82.2)	31.8 (89.2)	33.1 (91.6)	35.1 (95.2)	33.5 (92.3)	31.3 (88.3)	23.6 (74.5)	16.3 (61.3)	10.6 (51.1)	35.1 (95.2)
Mean maximum °C (°F)	4.6 (40.3)	5.1 (41.2)	12.1 (53.8)	22.1 (71.8)	26.4 (79.5)	28.1 (82.6)	30.2 (86.4)	29.3 (84.7)	24.4 (75.9)	17.8 (64.0)	10.4 (50.7)	6.2 (43.2)	31.4 (88.5)
Mean daily maximum °C (°F)	−1.8 (28.8)	−1.1 (30.0)	4.0 (39.2)	12.2 (54.0)	18.1 (64.6)	21.4 (70.5)	23.7 (74.7)	22.5 (72.5)	17.0 (62.6)	9.9 (49.8)	3.6 (38.5)	−0.2 (31.6)	10.8 (51.4)
Daily mean °C (°F)	−4.1 (24.6)	−4.1 (24.6)	0.0 (32.0)	6.7 (44.1)	12.2 (54.0)	15.8 (60.4)	18.1 (64.6)	16.8 (62.2)	11.9 (53.4)	6.3 (43.3)	1.5 (34.7)	−2.2 (28.0)	6.6 (43.8)
Mean daily minimum °C (°F)	−7.0 (19.4)	−7.7 (18.1)	−4.3 (24.3)	1.1 (34.0)	5.7 (42.3)	9.7 (49.5)	12.1 (53.8)	11.0 (51.8)	7.0 (44.6)	2.7 (36.9)	−0.8 (30.6)	−4.5 (23.9)	2.1 (35.8)
Mean minimum °C (°F)	−21.7 (−7.1)	−21.0 (−5.8)	−13.9 (7.0)	−5.9 (21.4)	−1.6 (29.1)	3.4 (38.1)	6.9 (44.4)	4.8 (40.6)	−0.4 (31.3)	−5.1 (22.8)	−10.0 (14.0)	−14.9 (5.2)	−25.7 (−14.3)
Record low °C (°F)	−42.7 (−44.9)	−43.2 (−45.8)	−32.0 (−25.6)	−18.6 (−1.5)	−5.5 (22.1)	−1.3 (29.7)	2.1 (35.8)	−1.5 (29.3)	−5.0 (23.0)	−14.7 (5.5)	−24.1 (−11.4)	−38.7 (−37.7)	−43.2 (−45.8)
Average precipitation mm (inches)	40.3 (1.59)	38.7 (1.52)	35.5 (1.40)	34.6 (1.36)	61.6 (2.43)	74.2 (2.92)	72.9 (2.87)	71.7 (2.82)	56.1 (2.21)	58.6 (2.31)	48.4 (1.91)	42.8 (1.69)	635.4 (25.03)
Average precipitation days (≥ 1.0 mm)	11	10	9	7	9	11	10	10	9	10	10	11	117
Average relative humidity (%)	87.1	84.8	76.6	68.2	68.6	72.3	74.6	77.0	82.0	85.4	88.7	88.7	79.5
Mean monthly sunshine hours	35.1	62.2	133.4	195.1	270.2	271.9	277.2	244.5	156.4	87.9	30.5	24.9	1,789.3
Source 1: LVĢMC
Source 2: NOAA (precipitation days, humidity 1991–2020) Infoclimat

== Demographics ==
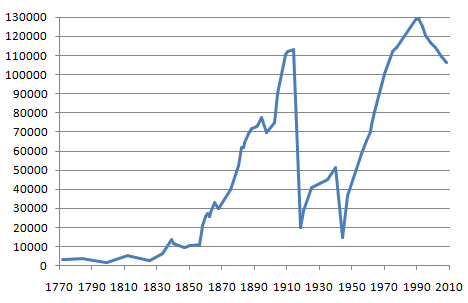
Dynamics of the population of Daugavpils in 1772–2008

As of 1 January 2023, the city had a population of 78,850.

Historically, Daugavpils has been known to be a multicultural city and according to the census carried out in 1935, the demographic image of the city was completely different: totaling 45 160 inhabitants, Latvians made 33.57%, followed by Jewish people making 24.59%, then Polish people equaling 18.15%, Russians 17.84%, and Belarusians 2.56%.

In Daugavpils 85% of the voters supported the proposal to make Russian the second state language in the 2012 referendum.

Demographics of Daugavpils 2019 data
Russians	48.6%
Latvians	20.1%
Poles	13.3%
Belarusians	7.6%
Ukrainians	2.0%
Lithuanians	0.9%
Roma	0.4%
Others	7.1%

Back in 1930 Daugavpils was one of the most ethnically diverse cities in Europe, with no ethnic group making up more than 30% of the total:

Demographics of Daugavpils 1930 data
Latvians	27.0%
Jews	26.9%
Poles	20.8%
Russians	19.5%
Belarusians	2.3%
Others	3.5%

=== Religion ===
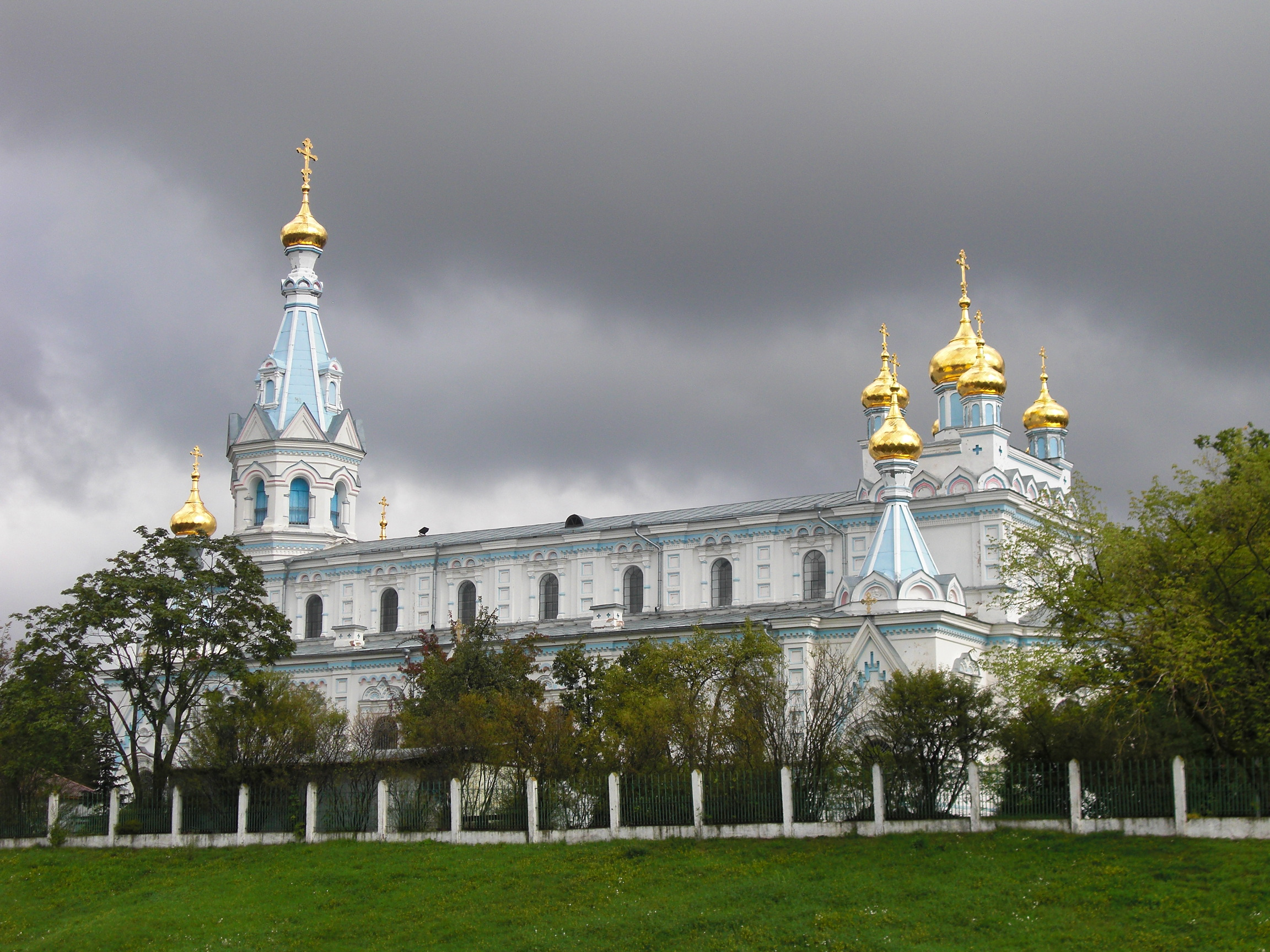
Ss Boris and Gleb Orthodox Cathedral, the biggest Orthodox church in Latvia

Church Hill (Baznīcu kalns) is a city landmark. Very prominently, all of the main denominations practiced in Latvia: Lutheran, Catholic, Orthodox and Old Believer are represented.

Places of worship in the city:

- Martin Luther Cathedral
- Ss. Boris and Gleb Cathedral
- St. Alexander Nevsky Cathedral
- St. Alexander Nevsky Church
- Immaculate Conception Catholic Church
- St. Peter-in-Chains Catholic Church
- Heart of Jesus Catholic Church
- Grīva Catholic Church
- Old Believers' Church of Resurrection, Birth of Mother of God and St. Nicholas
- Vecforštate Old Believers' House of Prayer
- Daugavpils Synagogue - restored 2003–2006

Before the Second World War, there were more than 40 synagogues in the city.

- The Church of Jesus Christ of Latter-Day Saints 2003

== Art, architecture, and culture ==
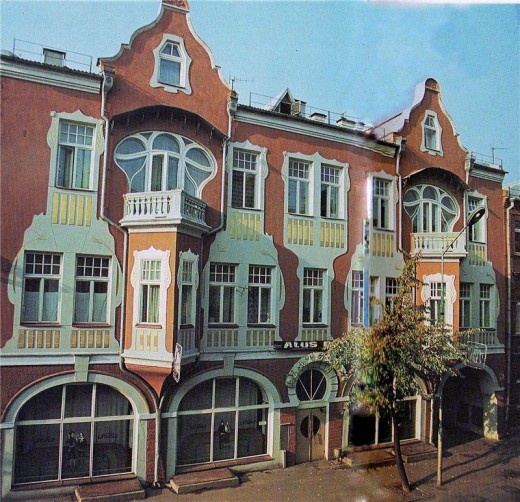
An Art Nouveau building on 41 Saules street

Daugavpils is an important cultural centre in eastern Latvia. There are 22 primary and secondary schools, four vocational schools, and the Saules College of Art. More than 1,000 teachers and engineers graduate from the University of Daugavpils (formerly Daugavpils Pedagogical University) and the local branch of Riga Technical University annually. There is also a Polish gymnasium (academic secondary school) on Varšavas iela (Warsaw Street).

=== Historical centre ===
The historical centre of Daugavpils city is an architectural heritage of national importance (the construction work was carried out in the 19th century according to the project endorsed in St Petersburg in 1826). The historical centre is the most popular attraction in the city. Daugavpils has an ensemble of both classic and eclectic styles. The cultural heritage of architectural, artistic, industrial, and historical monuments combined with the picturesque surroundings create the essence of Daugavpils's image.

In 2020, the municipality allocated 70,000 euros for the restoration of eight historical buildings, including Art Nouveau and red brick buildings.

There are also several architectural, historical, and cultural monuments in Daugavpils. The most prominent are:

- Daugavpils fortress - built in the years 1810–1878, after the decree of Tsar Alexander I of Russia. In April 2013 the Mark Rothko Art centre was opened in the fortress. Formerly, the fortress hosted also the Baroque Daugavpils Jesuit Church, but it was destroyed in 1944 and the ruins were demolished in 1950s.
- St. Peter-in-Chains Catholic Church - the oldest preserved church in the city, built in 1845-1848 and rebuilt in 1924–1934.
- Alexander Nevsky Cathedral - Orthodox church built in 1999–2003 in place of the old Orthodox cathedral, which was built in 1856-1864 and destroyed in 1969.
- Daugavpils Synagogue - built in 1850
- Church Hill (Baznīci kalnas) - place where the churches of four Christian denominations are located next to each other: Immaculate Conception Catholic Church, Martin Luther Cathedral, Ss. Boris and Gleb Cathedral and First Old Believers’ House of Prayer.
- Daugavpils Theatre - built in 1937–1938 by Verners Vitands and restored in 2007.
- Socialist realist buildings of the Daugavpils railway station and the University of Daugavpils
- Daugavpils Regional Studies and Art Museum
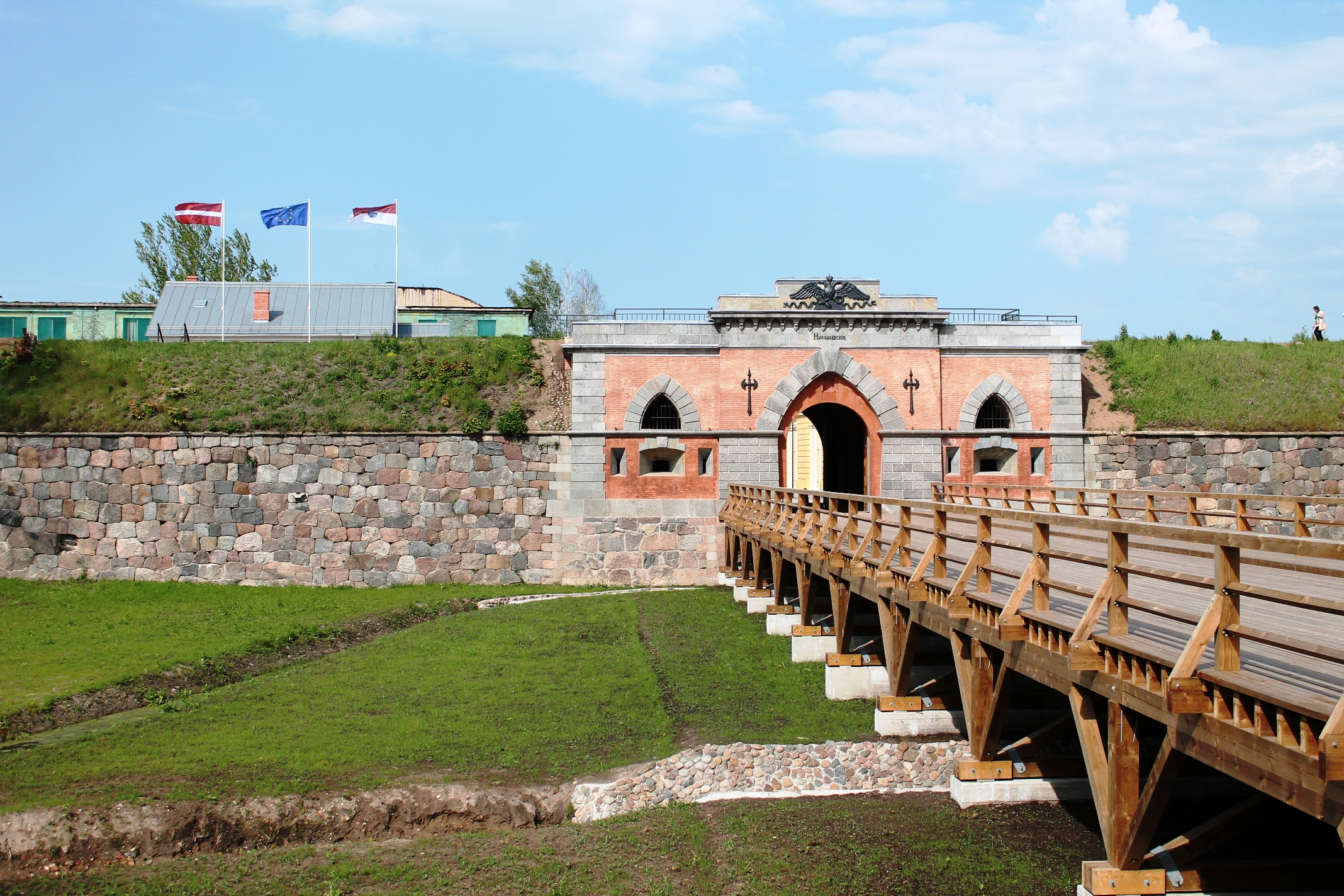
Nicholas Gate at Daugavpils Fortress

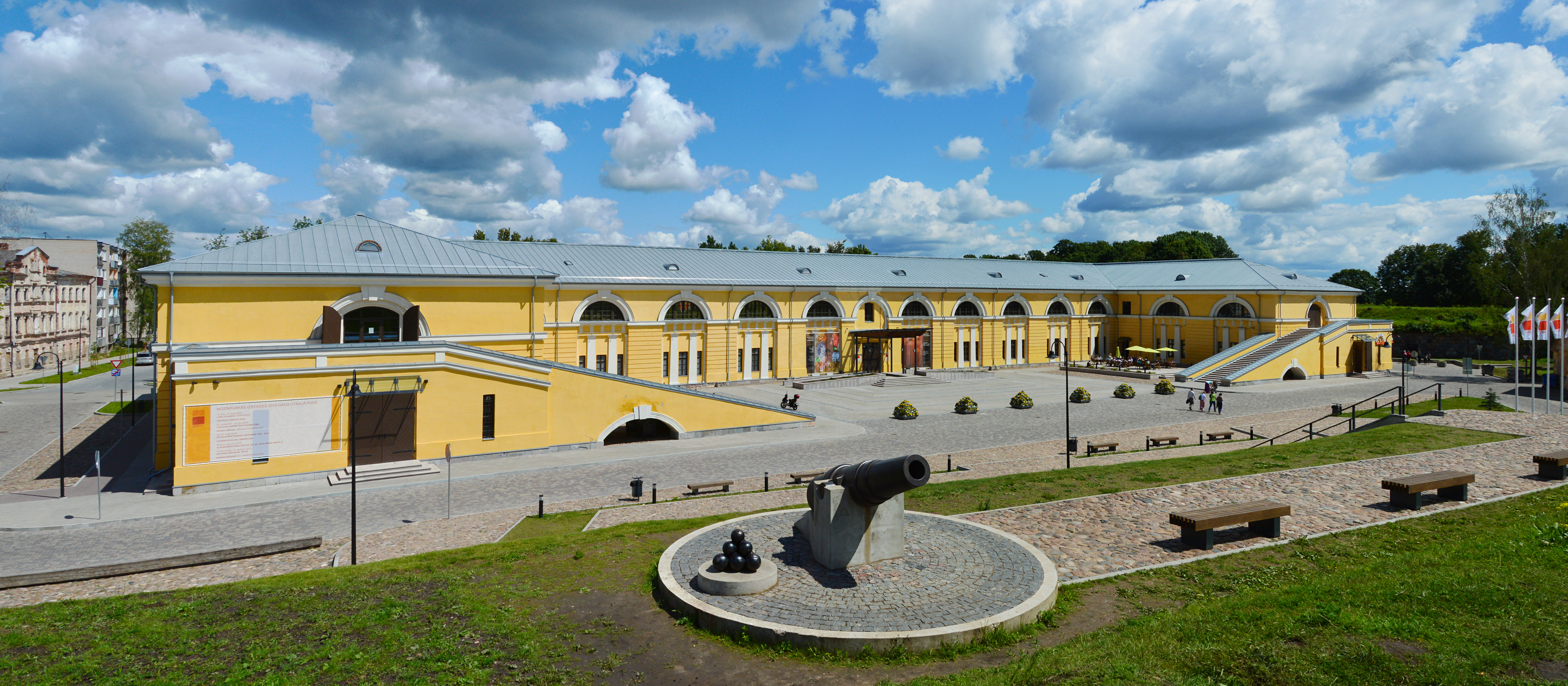
Mark Rothko Art Centre

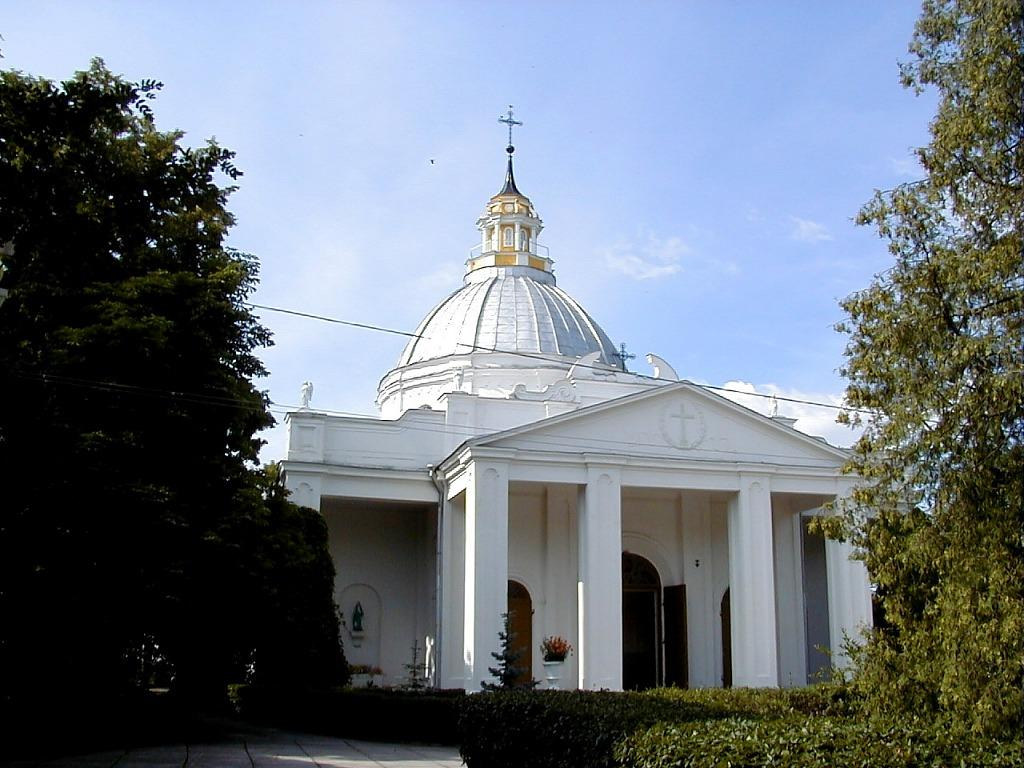
St. Peter-in-Chains Catholic Church

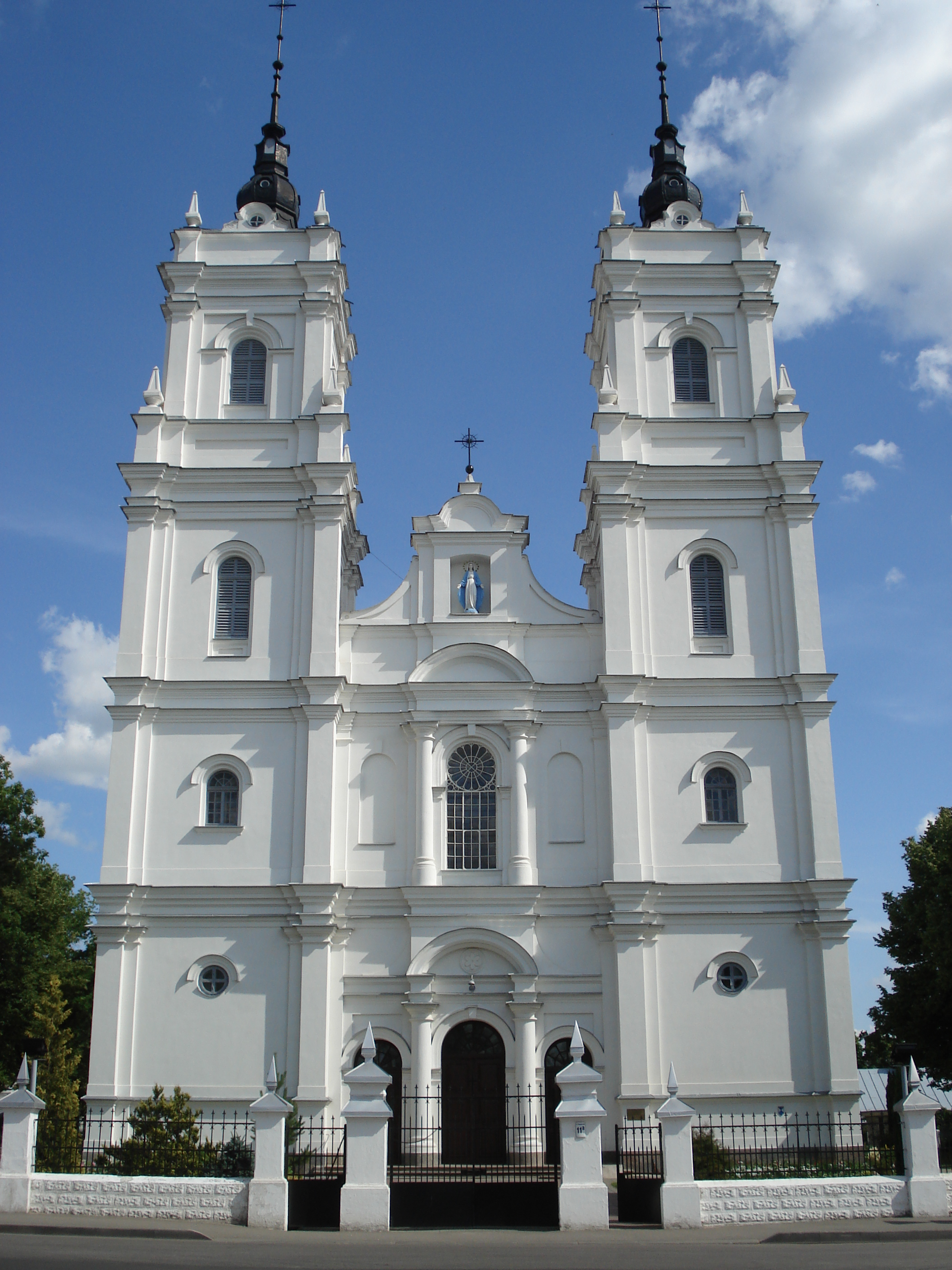
Immaculate Conception Catholic Church

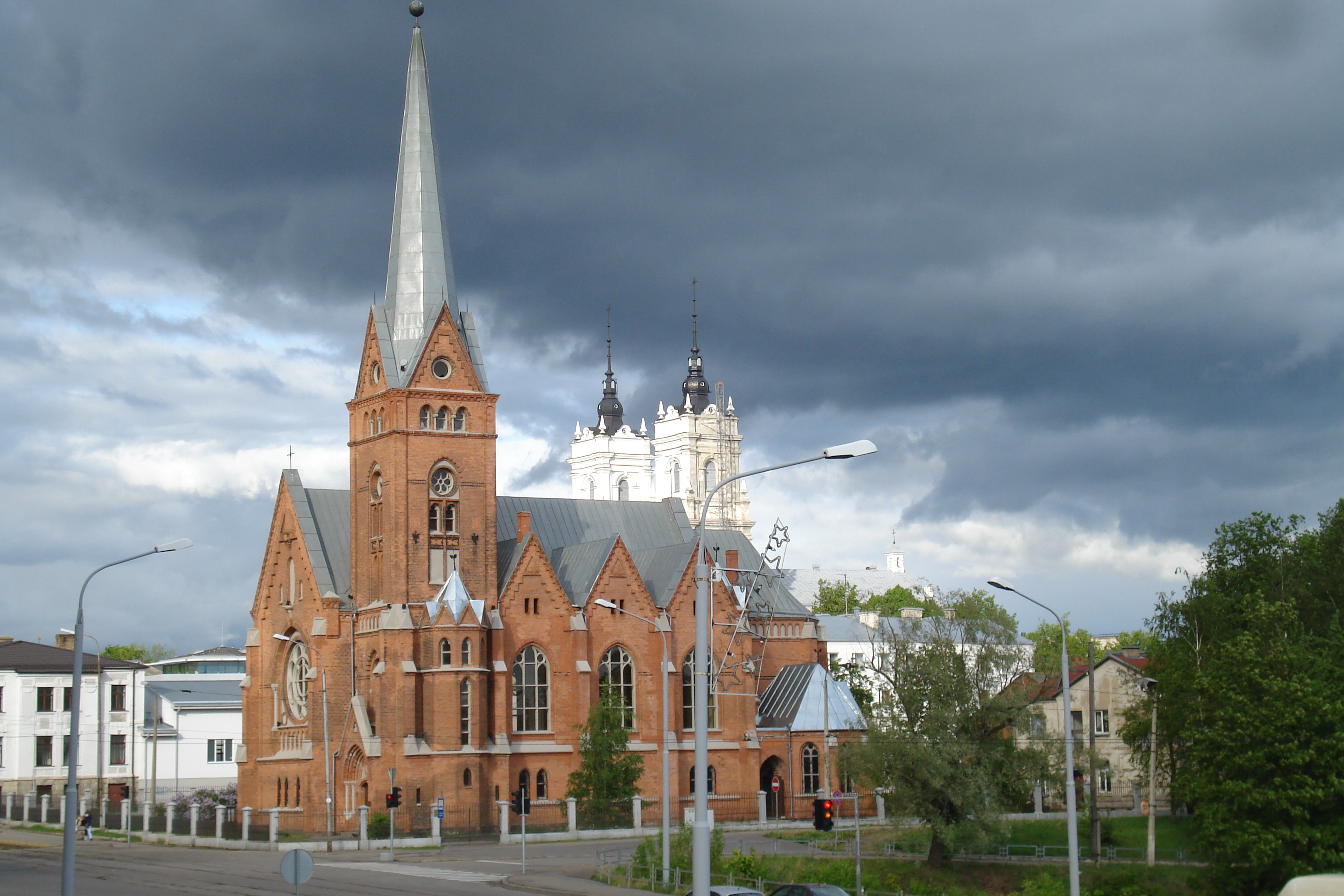
Martin Luther Cathedral

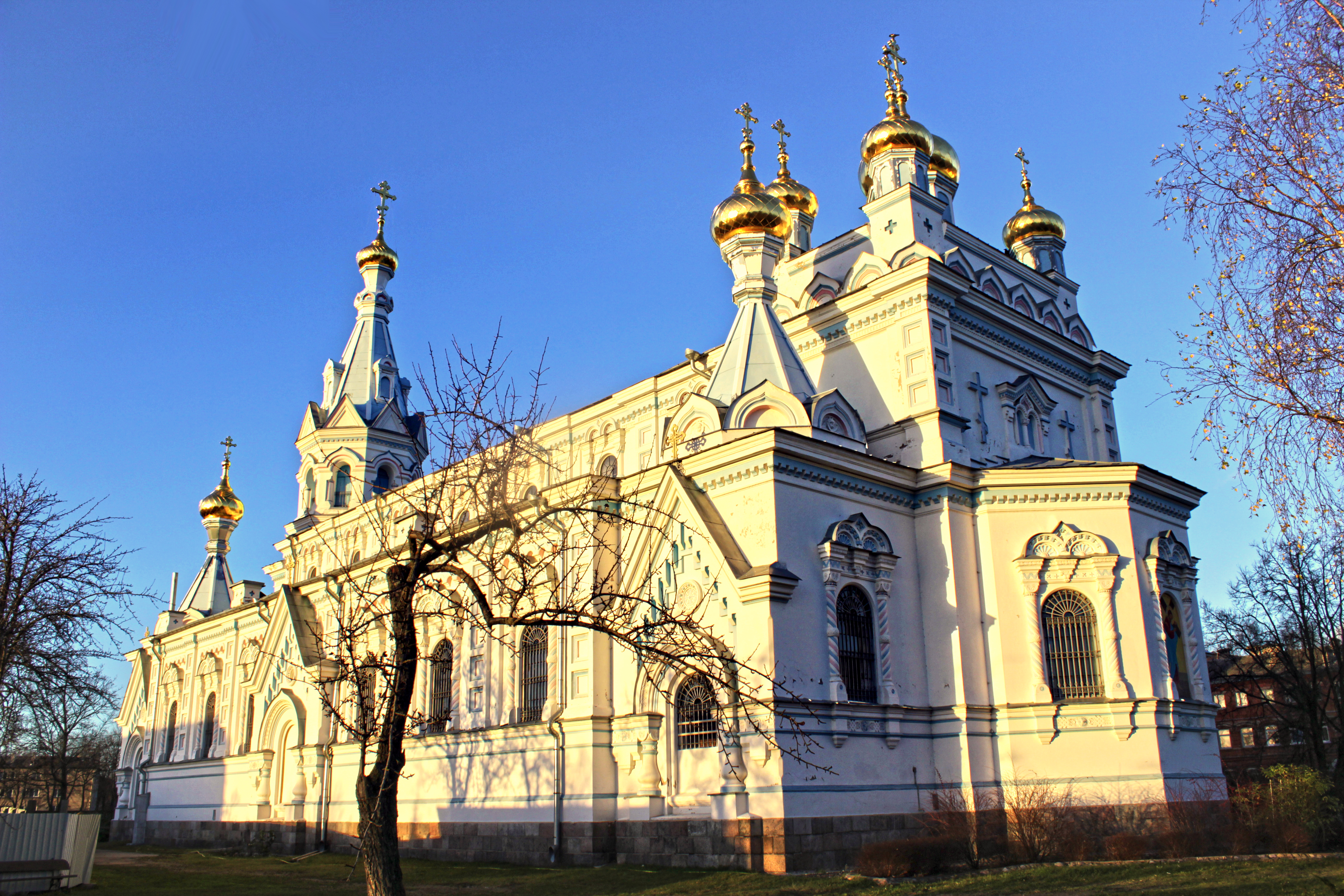
Ss. Boris and Gleb Orthodox Cathedral

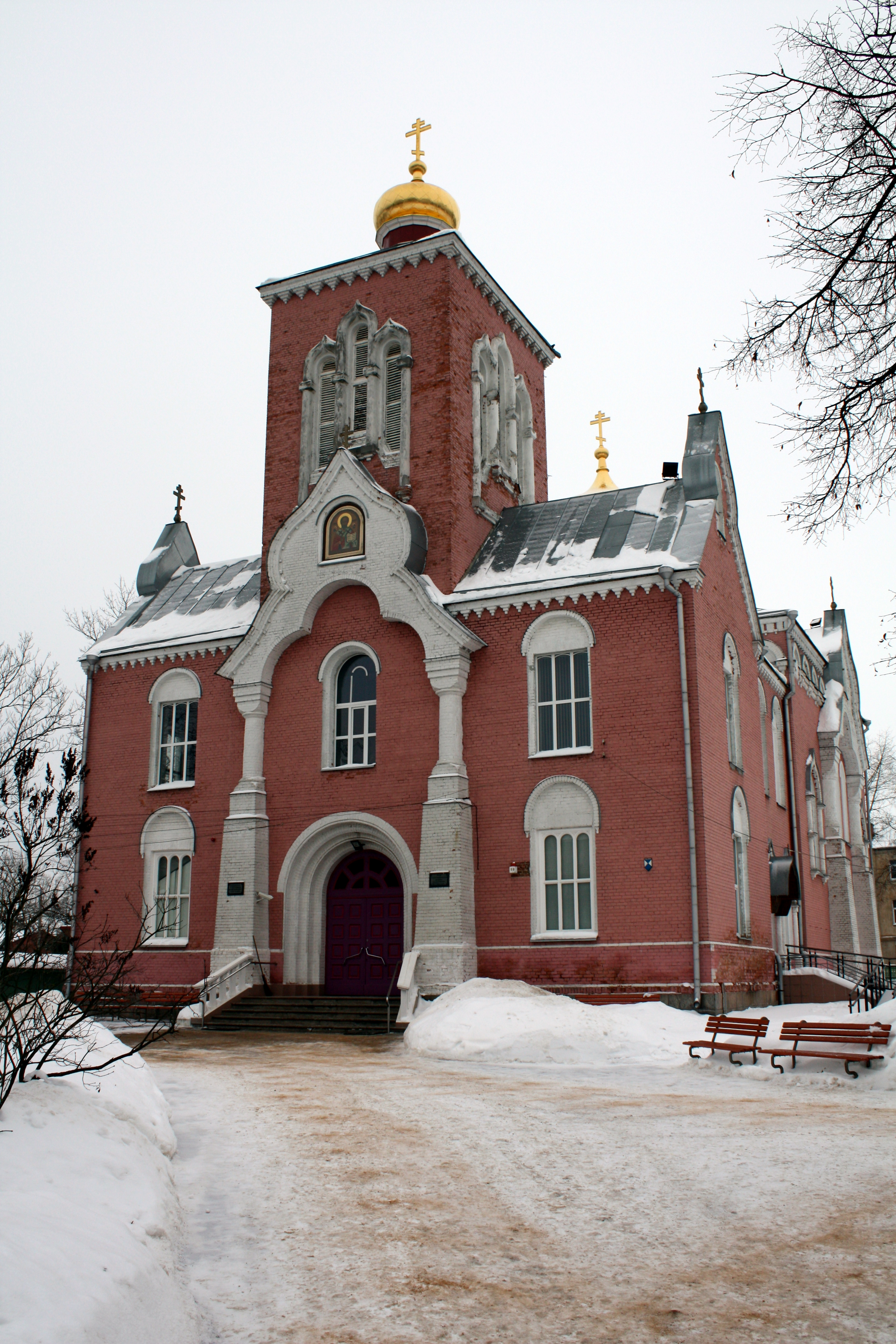
First Old Believers’ House of Prayer

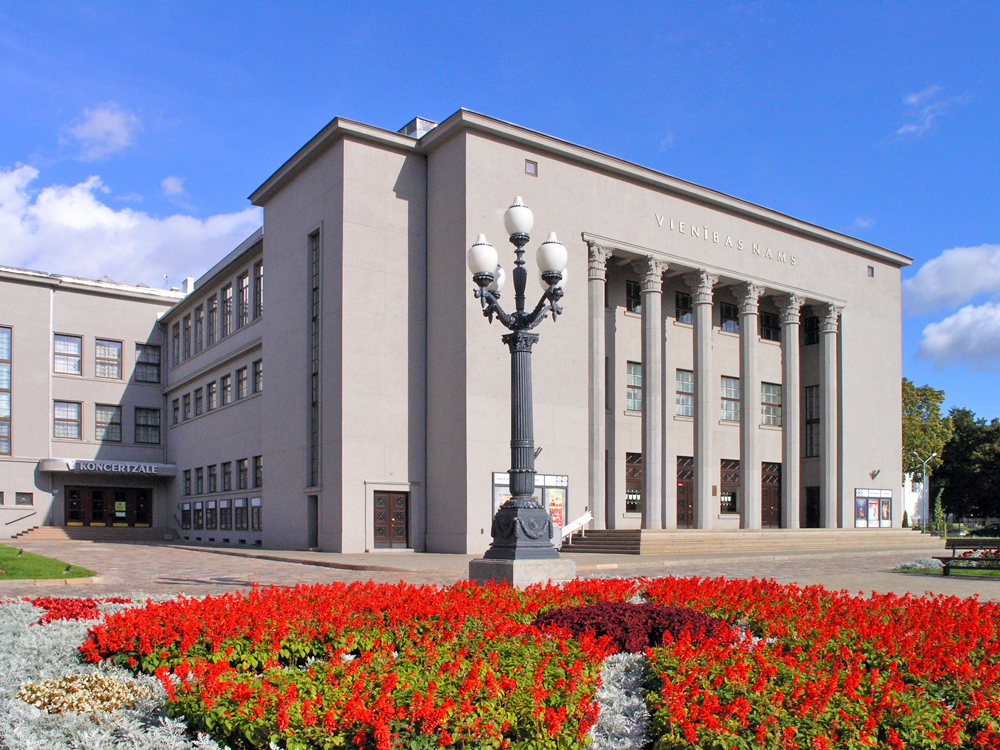
Daugavpils Theatre

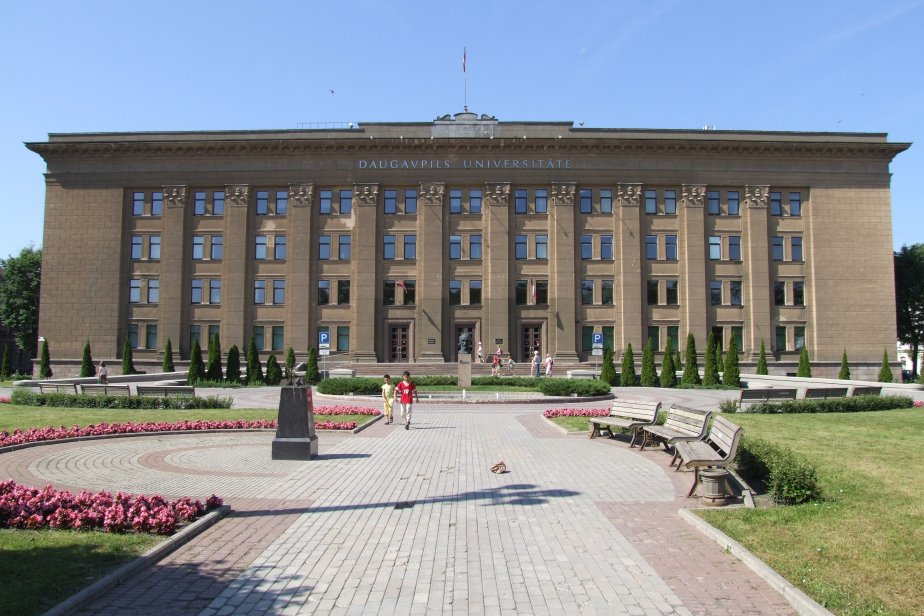
University of Daugavpils

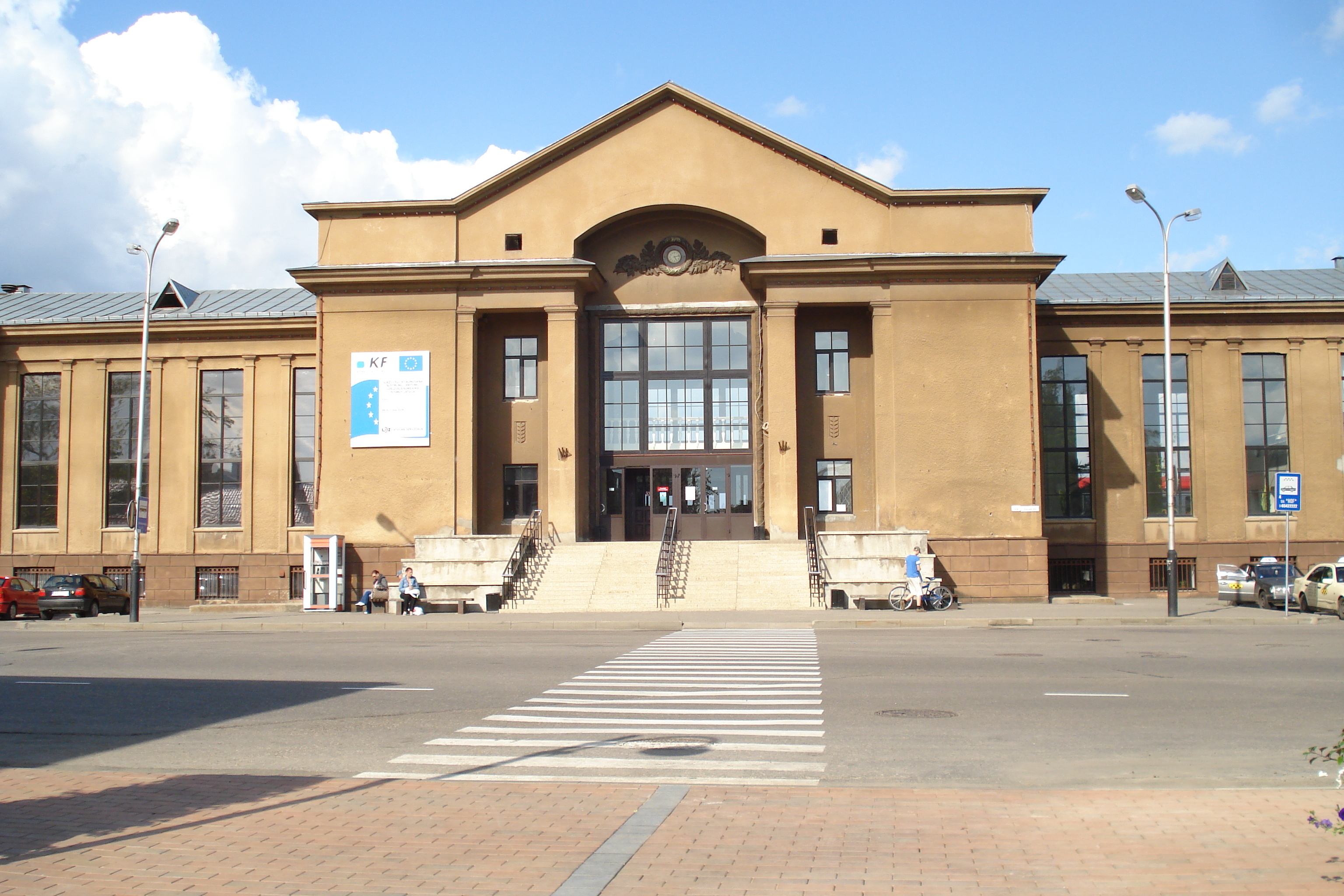
Train station

=== Red brick buildings ===
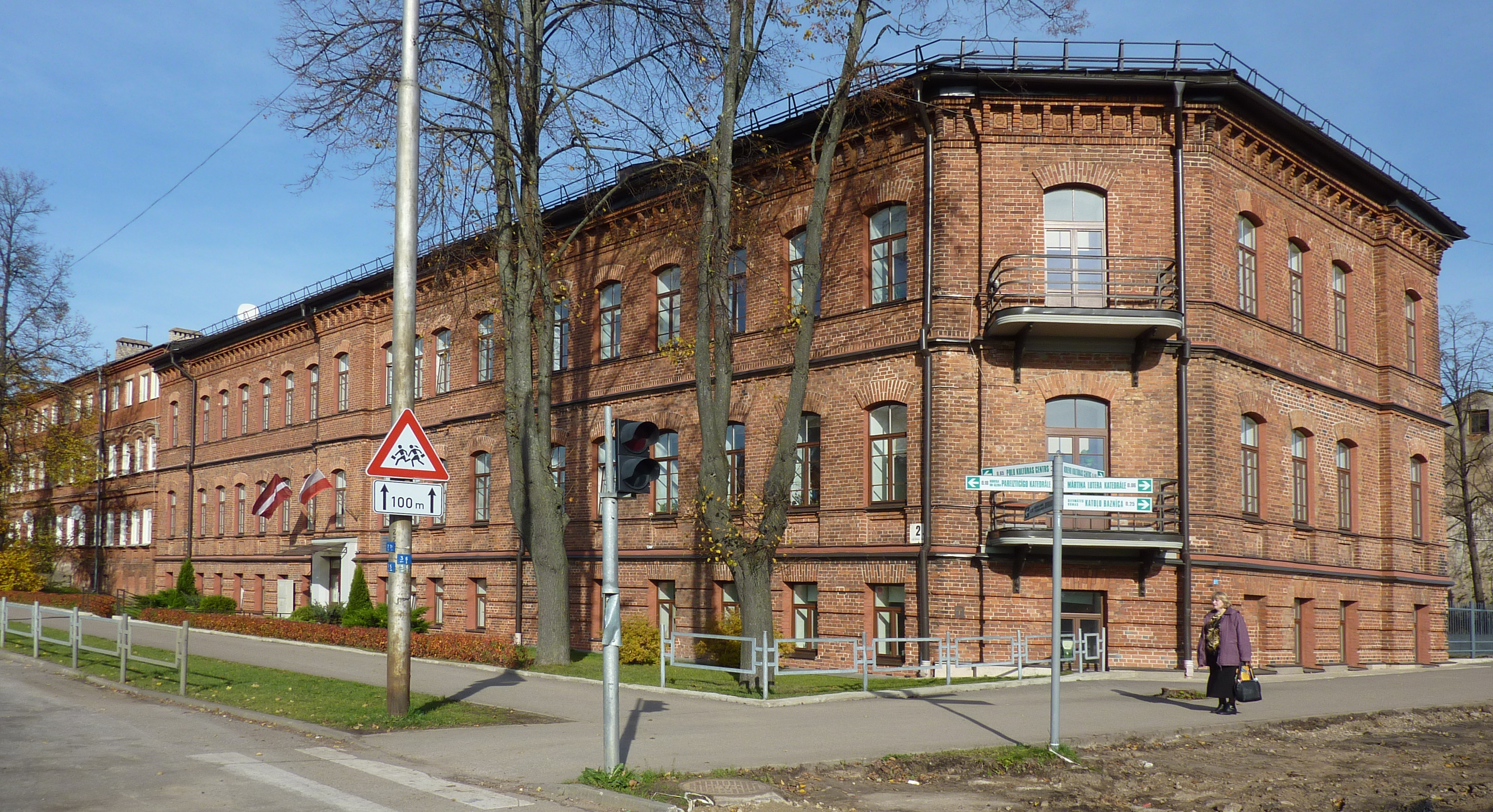
Polish-language gymnasium (academic secondary school)

Daugavpils is rich in red brick buildings. This style was developed by many outstanding architects. In Daugavpils, this variety of eclecticism is most widely represented in the buildings designed by Wilhelm Neumann, an architect of German origin who was the chief architect of the city from 1878 to 1895. Bright examples of brick architecture are the buildings at 1/3 Saules Street and at 8 Muzeja Street. The shape-forming techniques typical of eclecticism that were applied in the façades of these buildings even many decades later make one appreciate and admire the striking accuracy of detail.

== Transport ==
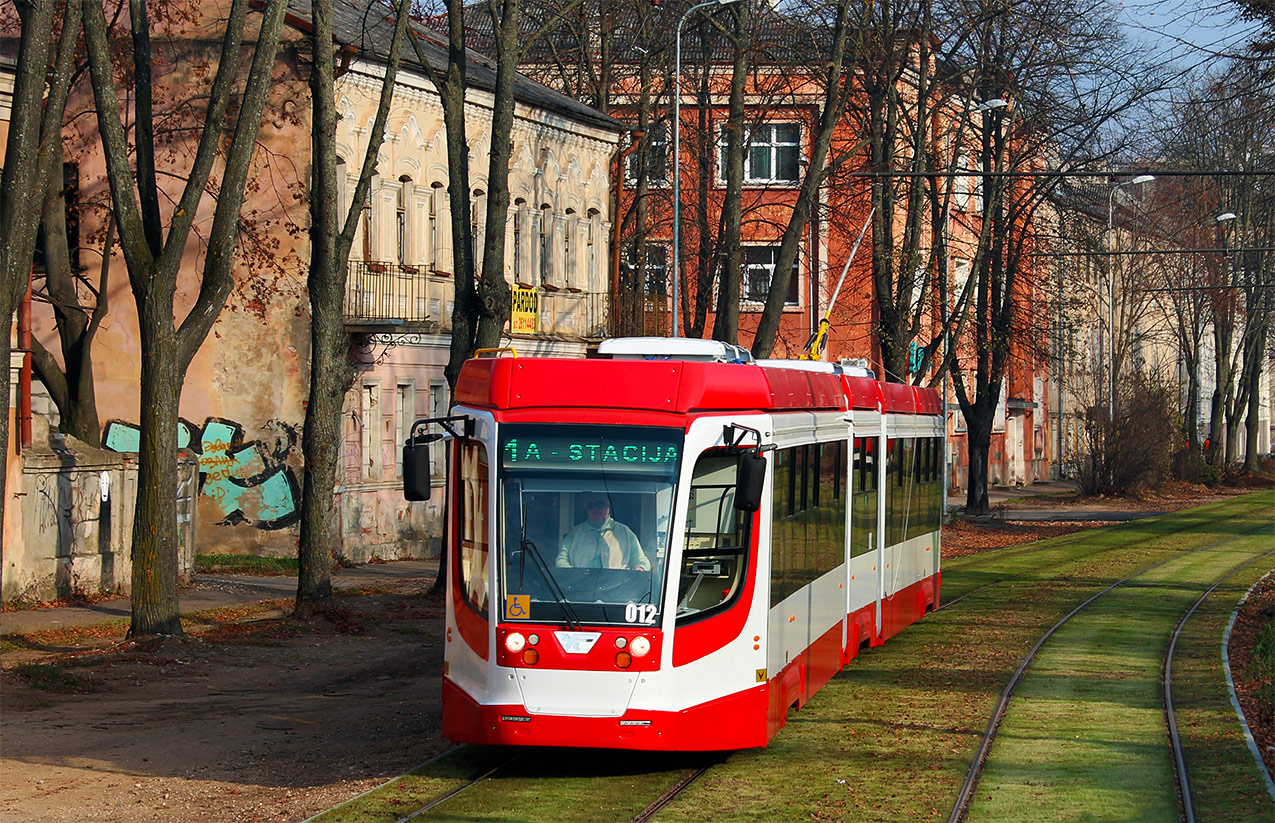
Daugavpils tram

Daugavpils satiksme AS oversees the city's bus and tram networks.

The city's railway station is the terminus of the Riga–Daugavpils Railway.

A former Soviet Air Force base is located at Lociki 12 km (7 mi) northeast of downtown Daugavpils with the potential to be redeveloped as a civilian or military/civilian airport, although no plans have come to fruition as of 2023. Griva Airfield is located 4 km NW of Daugavpils, next to the river. Its movements mainly involve parachute jumping and paragliding.

== Government ==
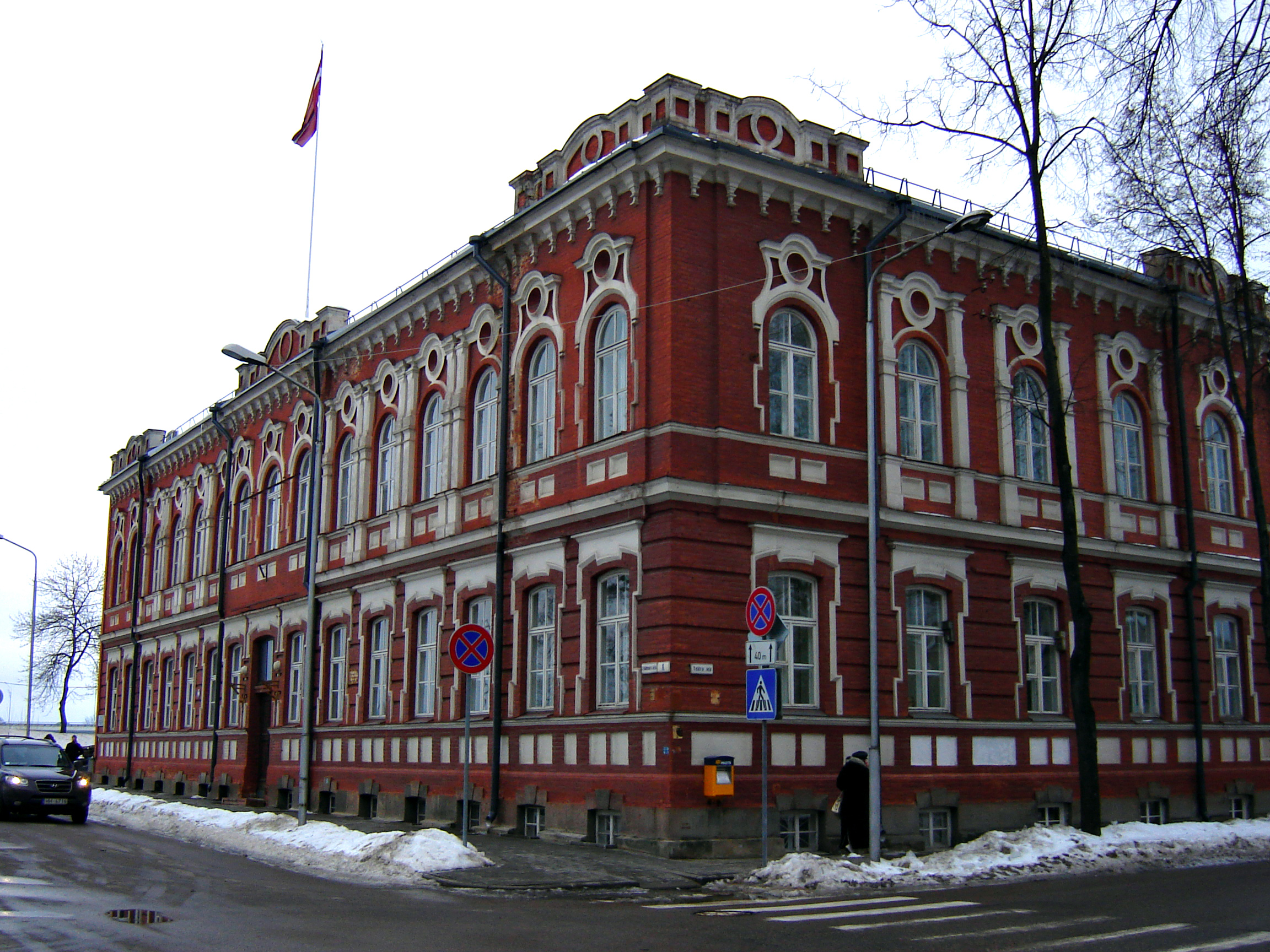
Daugavpils City Hall

The head of the city government is the mayor of Daugavpils or, literally, 'Council Chairman' (domes priekšsēdētājs). The incumbent since January 2021 is Andrejs Elksniņš, an independent formerly of the Harmony party. It is his third term in office, his initial term was ended after the coalition broke apart in September 2017 less than a month following the 2017 municipal elections and he was succeeded by Rihards Eigims of the Latvian Green Party (elected on the "Our Party" electoral list). "Our Party" governed in coalition with the Latgale Party of the previous mayor Jānis Lāčplēsis. Eigims was previously mayor from 2001 to 2003 as leader of the Light of Latgale party and briefly in 2009 as a member of the Latvian Social Democratic Workers' Party.

The Council consists of 15 members who are elected every four years. The most recent election was in 2021.

== Economy ==
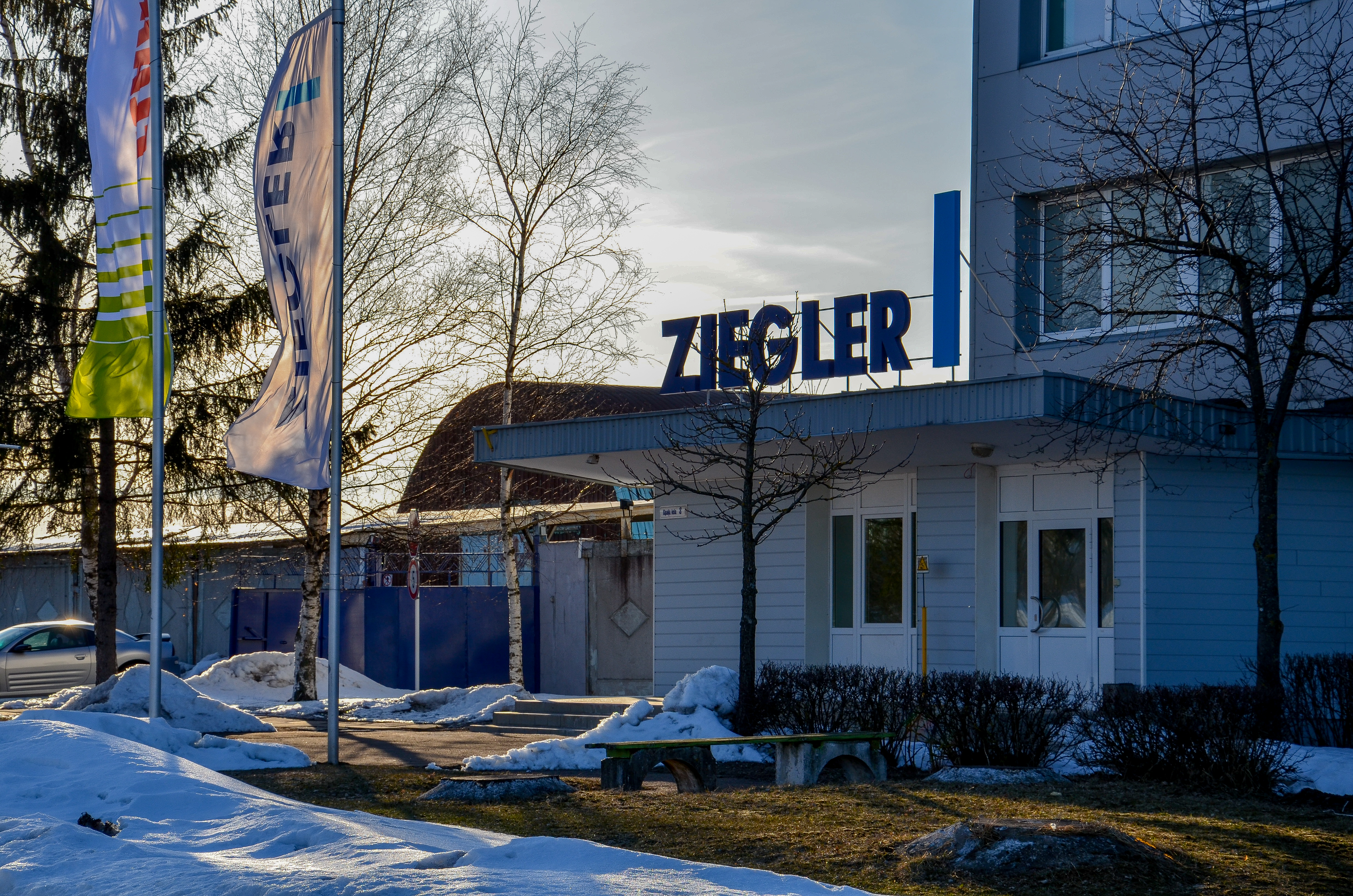
Ziegler machine works

Industry is important and local employers include the Daugavpils Locomotive Repair Plant (Daugavpils Lokomotīvju Remonta Rūpnīca), the Ditton Driving Chain Factory (Ditton pievadķēžu rūpnīca), DAUER group of metalworks, Latvijas Maiznieks commercial bakery, Ziegler GmbH machine works, Axon cable assembly plant, Nexis Fibers industrial yarn, Latgales alus SIA brewery and Fores, a manufacturer of windows and interior wood fittings.

The chemical industry was well developed during the Soviet era and largely disappeared after the return to capitalism in the 1990s. The Dauteks synthetic fibre plant was one of the largest in the USSR and was the second largest industrial employer in Latvia. The Ķīmija suburb built to house its workers in the 1960s was named after the plant. It was owned by the French company Rhodia in the early 2000s before closing entirely. A number of tax incentives exist to attract new industrial investment to eastern Latvia.

== Sports ==
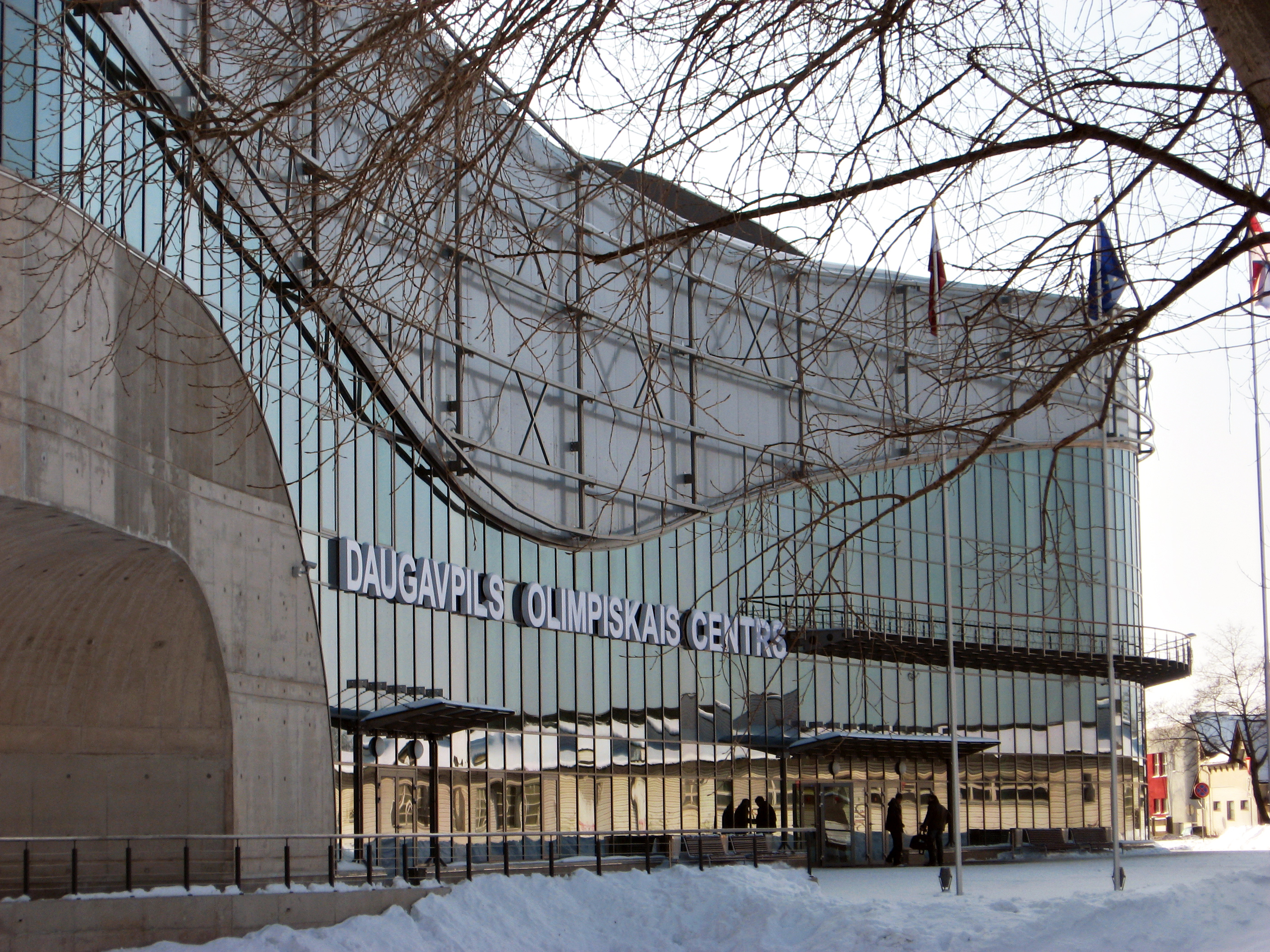
Daugavpils Olympic Centre

The Speedway Grand Prix of Latvia is currently held at the Latvijas Spīdveja Centrs with America's triple World Champion Greg Hancock being the most successful rider in Latvia winning the GP in 2009, 2009 and 2013. Lokomotiv Daugavpils is a Motorcycle speedway team which successfully competes in the Polish league system.

The football club BFC Daugavpils play at Celtnieks Stadium in Daugavpils. They play in the Latvian Higher League. In the past there was Dinaburg FC which played at the former Daugava Stadium.

FBC Latgale represent the city in floorball. There is also a hockey team called HK Dinaburga, which currently plays in the Latvian Hockey Higher League.

In 2008 the construction of the Daugavpils Multifunctional Sports Complex was started and was completed in October 2009.

== Notable residents ==
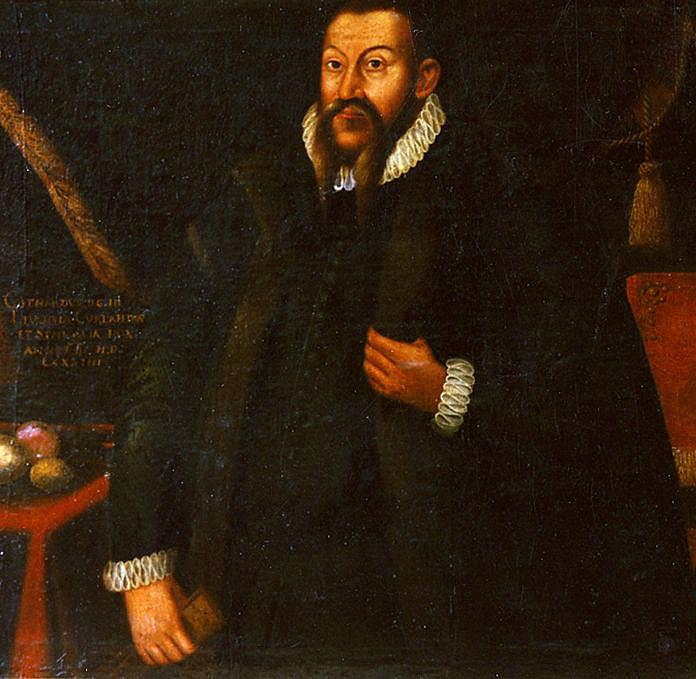
Gotthard Kettler

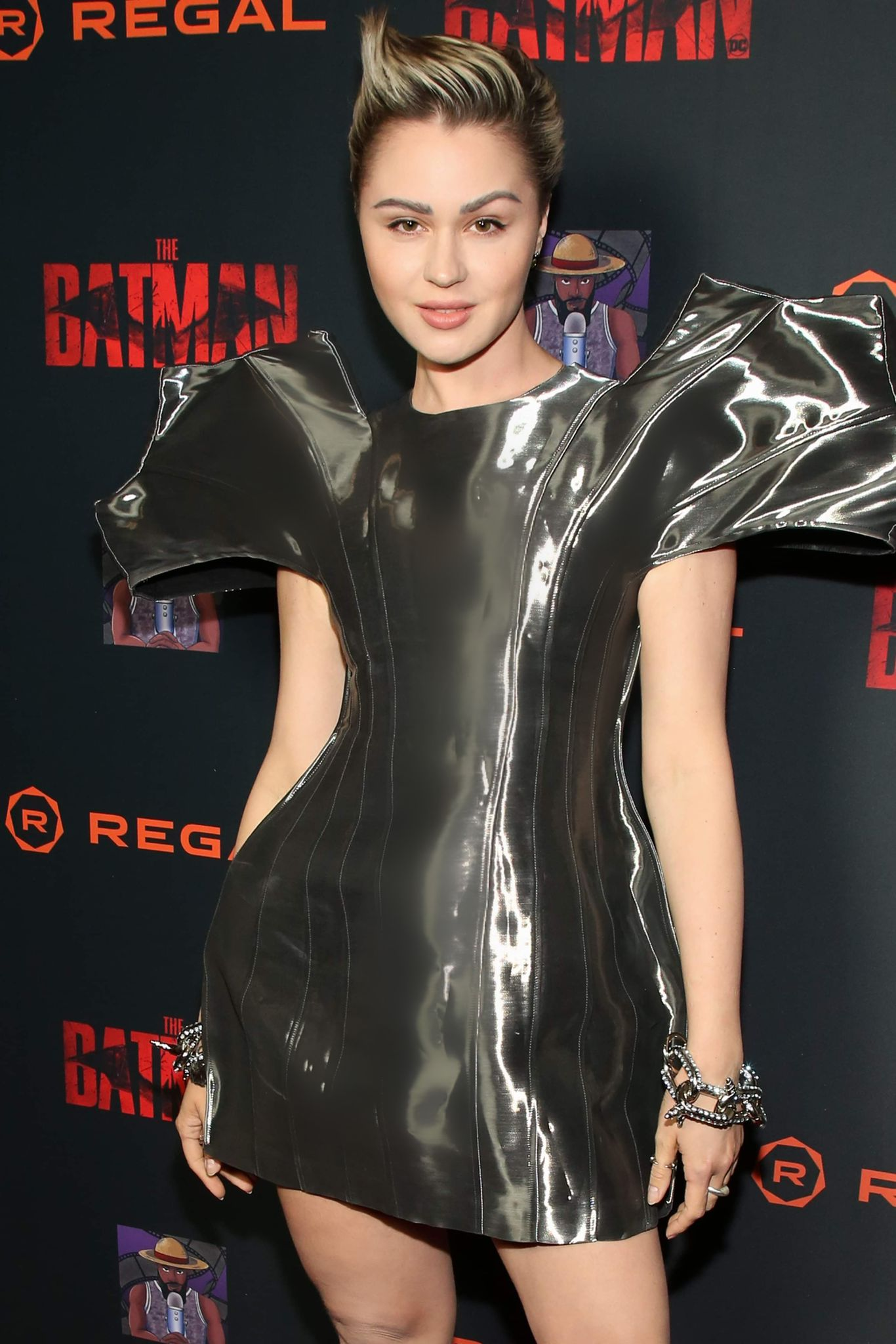
Viktoria Modesta, 2022

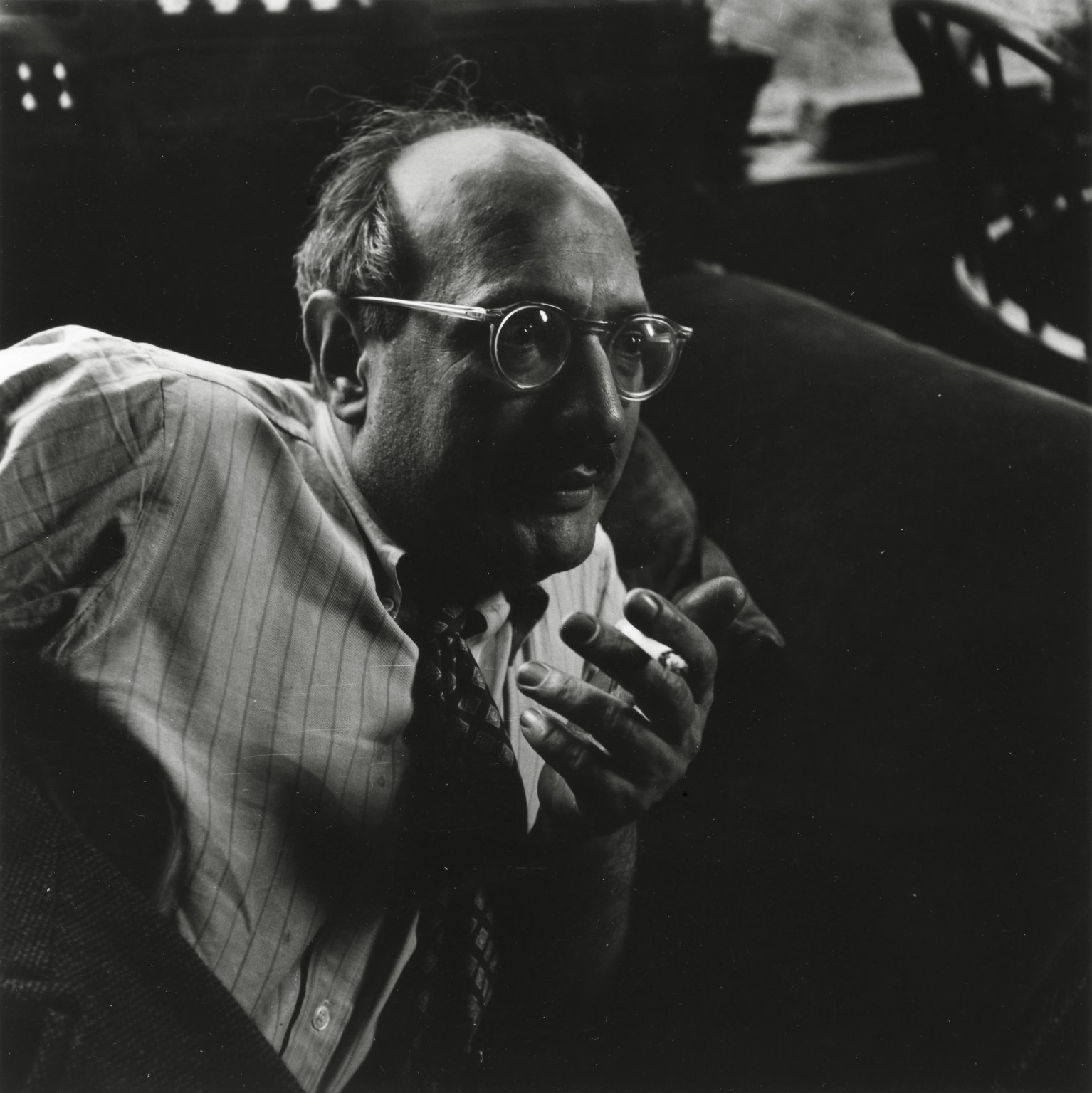
Mark Rothko, 1949

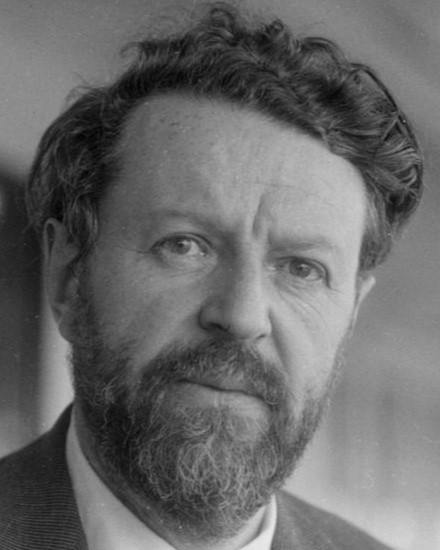
Isaac Steinberg, 1939

- Ilia Solomonovich Abelman (1866–1898), a Russian astronomer.
- Lidiia Alekseeva (1909–1989), Latvian poet and writer of short stories
- Andris Ambainis (born 1975), Latvian computer scientist
- Shaul Avigur (1899–1978), a founder of the Israeli Intelligence Community.
- Sir Stanford Cade (1895–1973), a British surgeon of Russian origin, pioneered the combined use of surgery and radiotherapy in the treatment of cancer
- Jean Alexander Heinrich Clapier de Colongue (1838–1901), a Baltic German marine engineer, founded a theory of magnetic deviation for magnetic compasses
- Teresa Czerwińska (born 1974), Polish economist, Minister of Finance of Poland (2018–2019)
- Leonid Dobychin (1894–1936), Russian writer
- Grzegorz Fitelberg (1879–1953), a Polish conductor, violinist and composer.
- Erna Gräsbeck (1879—1958), a Finnish operatic soprano
- Kastuś Jezavitaŭ (1893–1946), political and military leader within the Belarusian independence movement, aka Kanstancin Barysavič Jezavitaŭ
- Gotthard Kettler (1517–1587), last Master of the Livonian Order, first Duke of Courland and Semigallia
- Abraham Isaac Kook (1864–1935), rabbi, thinker, diplomat, mediator, scholar
- Jānis Lāčplēsis (born 1958), politician and former mayor of Daugavpils (2009-2011, 2013-2017).
- Pinchas HaKohen Lintup (1851–1924), rabbi and Kabbalist
- Pēteris Martinsons (1931–2013), Latvian ceramist, illustrator, and art teacher
- Solomon Mikhoels (1890–1948), Soviet Jewish actor and director
- Yevgeny Miller (1867–1939), a Baltic German Russian general
- Viktoria Modesta (born 1988), Latvian-born British singer-songwriter, performance artist, and model
- Grigorijs Ņemcovs (1948–2010), Latvian journalist, businessman and politician; murdered
- Nicolai Poliakoff OBE (1900–1974), creator of Coco the Clown
- Władysław Raginis (1908–1939), Polish officer
- Mark Rothko (1903–1970), American abstract expressionist painter
- Isaak Rubin (1886–1931), Jewish political economist and socialist activist
- Eli Siegel (1902–1978), a poet, writer, critic, and philosopher who founded Aesthetic Realism
- Meir Simcha of Dvinsk (1843–1926), rabbi, aka Meir Simcha Ha-Kohen
- Isaac Steinberg (1888–1957), writer, politician, co-founder of the Freeland League
- Władysław Studnicki (1867–1953), Polish pro-German politician and publicist
- Stanisław Swianiewicz (1899–1997), Polish economist and historian
- Vitas (born 1979), Russian singer, songwriter, composer, actor and fashion designer

=== Sport ===
- Konstantīns Calko (born 1994), Latvian racing driver
- Aleksandrs Cauņa (born 1988), Latvian footballer, played 145 games and 45 for Latvia
- Antonijs Černomordijs (born 1996), Latvian footballer, played 280 games and 52 for Latvia
- Movsas Feigins (1908–1950), Latvian chess master, aka Movša Feigins
- Aleksandrs Isakovs (born 1973), Latvian footballer, played 350 games and 58 for Latvia
- Aleksandrs Jelisejevs (born 1971), Latvian footballer, played 270 games and 37 for Latvia
- Artjoms Rudņevs (born 1988), Latvian footballer 274 games and 38 for Latvia
- Uļjana Semjonova (born 1952), basketball player
- Māris Smirnovs (born 1976), Latvian footballer, played 268 games and 21 for Latvia
- Deniss Vasiļjevs (born 1999), Latvian figure skater
- Alberts Zvejnieks (1902–1987), wrestler, he competed at the 1928 and the 1936 Summer Olympics

== Twin towns – sister cities ==
Daugavpils is twinned with:

- Alaverdi, Armenia
- Babruysk, Belarus
- (Georgia (country)) Batumi, Georgia
- Central Administrative Okrug (Moscow), Russia
- Ferrara, Italy
- Harbin, China
- Kharkiv, Ukraine
- Lida, Belarus
- Magdeburg, Germany
- Motala, Sweden
- Naro-Fominsk, Russia
- Panevėžys, Lithuania
- Pskov, Russia
- Radom, Poland
- Ramla, Israel
- Saint Petersburg, Russia
- Vagharshapat, Armenia
- Vitebsk, Belarus

== Significant depictions in popular culture ==
- Dunaburg (Daugavpils) is one of the starting towns of the State of the Teutonic Order in the turn-based strategy game Medieval II: Total War: Kingdoms.

== See also ==
- Daugavpils Ice Arena
- Daugavpils Prison

== Bibliography ==
- Dybaś, Bogusław; Jeziorski, Paweł A. (2018). Szlachta polsko-inflancka wobec przełomu. Materiały z dyneburskich akt grodzkich i ziemskich z lat 1764 –1775 (in Polish). Toruń: Towarzystwo Naukowe w Toruniu; Instytut Historii Polskiej Akademii Nauk.
