= Erna Gräsbeck =

Finnish opera singer

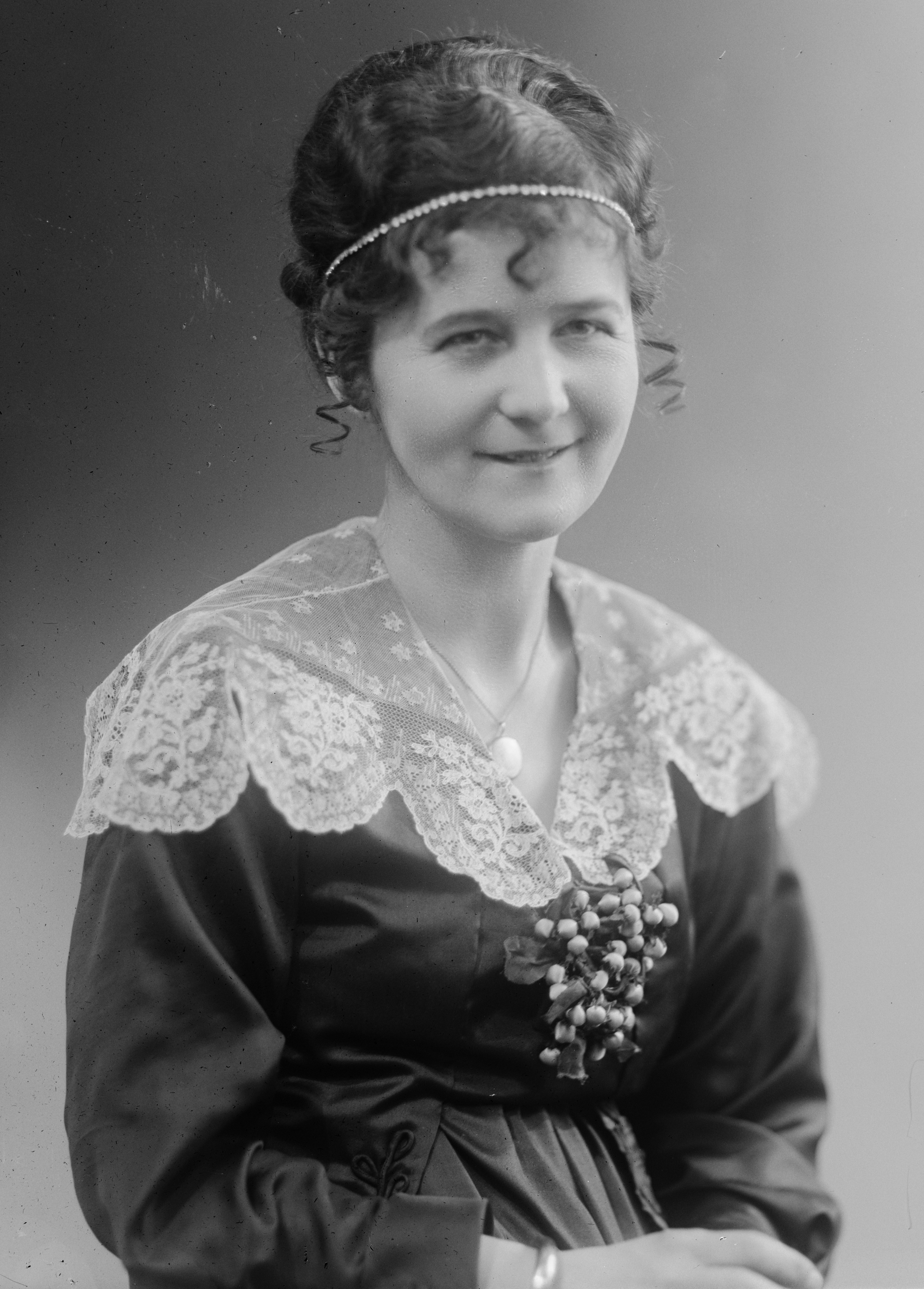
- Born: 24 January 1879; Dünaburg, Lithuania
- Died: 11 April 1958 (aged 79); Helsinki, Finland
- Spouse: Niklas Järnefelt (m. 1929; died 1932)

Erna Gräsbeck (from 1929 Järnefelt; (Note: Her maiden name, by which she is best known, is Gräsbeck. Her married name is officially Järnefelt, in some sources also shown as Gräsbeck-Järnefelt.) 24 January 1879 — 11 April 1958) was a Finnish operatic soprano, and a key figure in the Finnish opera scene in the early part of the 20th century.

== Early life and education ==
Erna Gräsbeck was born in Dünaburg (today's Daugavpils) to colonel Karl Alfred Gräsbeck and Rosalie née Sahlstein.

After secondary school, she began her voice training at the Helsinki Music Institute (now part of Sibelius Academy) under Abraham Ojanperä. This was followed by study trips first to Rome and then to Berlin, where she was taught by Louis Bachner and Etelka Gerster.

== Career ==
Gräsbeck's professional debut came in Asti, Italy, where she stood in for the regular cast member in the role of Mimi in Puccini's La bohème. Afterwards, in Berlin, she performed frequently, alongside her studies, at the Komische Oper Berlin and Theater des Westens.

She soon returned to Finland, however, and to what was to become the Finnish National Opera, where she performed between 1911 and 1929 over 30 different parts and nearly 500 performances, covering key Wagnerian soprano roles as well as ones by Verdi, Mozart and others.

She also performed contemporary Finnish music, most notably works by Erkki Melartin, including in his Aino at the inaugural Savonlinna Opera Festival in 1912. She also sang the role of Kelmä in the Finnish premiere of the opera Kullervo by Armas Launis.

Gräsbeck gave concert tours around Europe, including in Copenhagen, Berlin and Rome.

She is also known to have recorded Finnish folks songs and lieds on at least three occasions, in 1912, 1913 and 1925.

== Personal life ==
Gräsbeck retired from performing in 1929, when she married engineer Niklas Järnefelt. He nevertheless died after only three years, in 1932.
