= Daugavpils Locomotive Repair Plant =

Latvian railway rolling stock repair company

- Native name: AS "Daugavpils Lokomotīvju Remonta Rūpnīca"
- Type: Joint-stock company
- Industry: Railway rolling stock repair and metalworking
- Founded: 1866
- Headquarters: Marijas iela 1, Daugavpils, Latvia
- Revenue: 58,955,892 euro (2022)
- Net income: 4,925,279 euro (2022)
- Total assets: 60,963,086 euro (2022)
- Number of employees: 92 (2022)
- Website: www.dlrr.eu

Daugavpils Locomotive Repair Plant (Latvian: Daugavpils Lokomotīvju Remonta Rūpnīca, abbreviated DLRR) is a Latvian railway rolling stock repair and metalworking company based in Daugavpils. Its industrial origin is traced to steam-locomotive repair workshops established in 1866, while the present joint-stock company was registered in Latvia on 3 October 1991.

The company works in rolling-stock repair and modernisation and in sub-contracting metalworking. The National Encyclopedia lists it among the Daugavpils companies with the largest turnover and identifies its field as railway locomotive and rolling-stock manufacturing.

== History ==
The Daugavpils railway workshops were established in 1866 on the Saint Petersburg–Warsaw and Riga–Oryol railway lines. According to the Latgales dati historical database, the workshops could carry out major repairs of 350 locomotives per year and by 1900 had become one of the more modern repair enterprises in the Russian Empire; in 1912 they employed 834 workers. The workshops were destroyed during the First World War in 1915.

After the Second World War, the locomotive repair plant was one of the large industrial enterprises reconstructed and expanded in Soviet Daugavpils. The company states that the plant was redesigned in 1965 for diesel-locomotive overhaul.

The present legal entity was registered on 3 October 1991 as the state railway company "Lokomotīve". Lursoft records later names including the state joint-stock company "Lokomotīve", a privatisable state joint-stock company of the same name, and AS "Lokomotīve" before the current name was registered in 2004.

== Ownership and stock listing ==
In December 2017, Estonian railway company Skinest Rail acquired direct and indirect control of 95.92 percent of DLRR's voting share capital. In January 2018 the Latvian financial regulator allowed Skinest Rail to make a final redemption of DLRR shares, and after the redemption Skinest Rail directly and through OÜ Lokomotiiv Investeeringud held 100 percent of the company's voting shares. Nasdaq Riga approved the delisting of DLRR's shares from the Baltic Secondary List in February 2018, with the last listing day set for 2 February 2018.

== Operations ==
DLRR's services include repair and modernisation of locomotives, shunters, diesel and electric multiple units and passenger rolling stock, as well as repair of equipment and production of spare parts. Its metalworking services include foundry work, machining, welding, forging, heat treatment and related production services.

In 2017, The Baltic Course reported that DLRR had won a Polish order to overhaul and modernise TEM2 locomotives for PKP Linia Hutnicza Szerokotorowa. The report described the contract as part of the company's reorientation after a fall in Russian-market orders.

In February 2022, Latvian Public Broadcasting reported that DLRR had invested €500,000 in production modernisation in the previous year and planned another €1 million in investments in 2022. The report described the company as developing new markets and services.

The Russian invasion of Ukraine in 2022 affected DLRR's operations. In March 2022, LSM and Baltic News Network reported that DLRR and three subsidiaries had notified the State Employment Agency of a collective dismissal affecting 240 employees, citing the impact of the war and unpaid debt connected with Ukrainian customer Metinvest Group. By September 2022, LSM reported that the company had signed six new contracts with partners in Poland, Czechia, Hungary, Romania and Croatia, with a combined value of about €4.5 million, in a recovery and export-diversification effort after the disruption caused by the war.

In 2026, LETA reported, citing the company, that DLRR had provided services in 14 markets in 2025, including rolling-stock repair, modernisation, engine and generator overhaul and metalworking, and that its clients included Deutsche Bahn. In Latvia's Most Valuable Enterprises TOP101 for 2025, prepared by Prudentia and Nasdaq Riga, the company was listed in 47th place with a reported value of €123.5 million.

== Tramcar production ==
In October 2022, Daugavpils municipal transport company Daugavpils Satiksme contracted DLRR to supply four low-floor tramcars by the end of 2023. LSM reported that the contract was worth €7.4 million and that the trams would be assembled in Daugavpils. In October 2023, LSM reported that DLRR had manufactured and delivered the first two of the four tramcars to Daugavpils Satiksme in cooperation with Czech company Pragoimex, and that the project had created 30 jobs at the plant.
