= FBC Latgale (floorball club) =

Latvian floorball club

FBC Latgale
Founded	2010
Sport Club	Latgale
Home hall	Daugavpils Olimpiskais Centrs (cap. 1350)
Based in	Daugavpils, Latvia
Colors	Dark Blue, Yellow
League	Men 1st Floorball League of Latvia
Head coach	Aleksandrs Petrovskis
Manager	Valerijs Oščenkovs

FBC Latgale is a Men's 1st Floorball League of Latvia team based in Daugavpils, Latvia

== Goaltenders ==
- 1 (Latvia) Atis Žilvinskis
- 31 (Latvia) Arturs Keniņš
- 98 (Latvia) Deniss Višņakovs

== Defencemen ==
- 7 (Latvia) Vladislavs Tipans
- 10 (Latvia) Andrejs Grigorjevs
- 11 (Latvia) Sergejs Aleksandrovs
- 15 (Latvia) Sergejs Prokofjevs
- 16 (Latvia) Jānis Kārkliņš
- 18 (Latvia) Artūrs Šķinčs
- 21 (Latvia) Raitis Daugelis
- 93 (Latvia) Ēriks Čate

== Forwards ==
- 5 (Latvia) Nauris Poikans
- 13 (Latvia) Maksims Krilovs
- 17 (Latvia) Elviss Millers
- 20 (Latvia) Elmars Kukjans
- 23 (Latvia) Sergejs Špeļkovs
- 33 (Latvia) Aleksandrs Grehovs
- 81 (Latvia) Janis Jonans
- 88 (Latvia) Maksims Terehovs
- 91 (Latvia) Ivans Kokins (C)
- 99 (Latvia) Igors Kalnačs
