= Stanisław Swianiewicz =

Polish economist and historian (1899–1997)

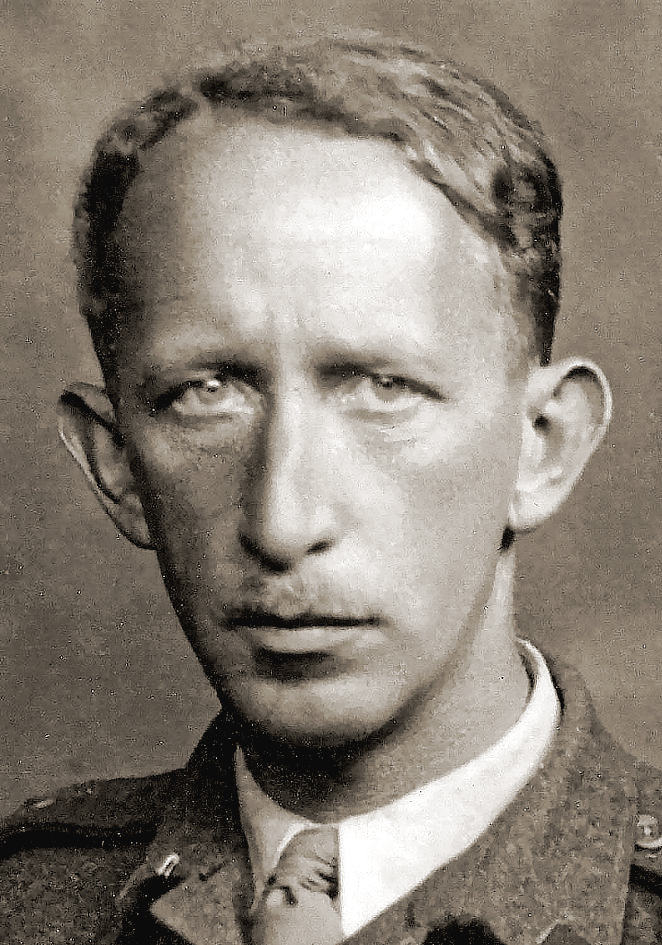
- Born: 7 November 1899; Dvinsk, Russian Empire
- Died: 22 May 1997 (aged 97); Chislehurst, United Kingdom
- Resting place: Lower Sackville Cemetery, Halifax, Canada
- Occupations: Professor at Saint Mary's University, Halifax
- Known for: Eyewitness testament of the Katyn massacre

Stanisław Swianiewicz (7 November 1899 – 22 May 1997) was a Polish economist and historian. A veteran of the Polish-Soviet War, he was during World War II a survivor of the Katyn massacre and an eyewitness of the transport of Polish prisoners-of-war to the forests outside Smolensk by the NKVD.

== Biography ==
Stanisław Swianiewicz was born on 7 November 1899 in Dvinsk, in Imperial Russia (now Daugavpils, Latvia), to a Polish szlachta family. Brought up in the multicultural society of Livonia, he spoke Polish, Russian and German as his native tongues. After graduating from a trade school in Orel, he attended Moscow University's Law Faculty, which then included all social sciences. After the Russian Revolution of 1917, he left Moscow and returned to his homeland, where, in 1919, he became a commander of the Polska Organizacja Wojskowa in the area of Livonia. During the Polish-Soviet War, he crossed the front lines and reached Vilna (now Vilnius), where he took part in the defense of the city against the Bolsheviks. He also took part in the seizure of Vilnius by the forces of General Lucjan Żeligowski.

Demobilized, he attended the Stefan Batory University, in Wilno, where he continued his studies. He graduated in 1924 and then spent several years on various scholarships in Paris, Breslau (modern Wrocław) and Kiel. A specialist in the Soviet economy and a liberal, Swianiewicz attended lectures by Władysław Zawadzki, who also became his tutor. In April 1939, Polish President Ignacy Mościcki awarded him a professorship. Apart from his work at his alma mater, Swianiewicz was also active in several NGOs that promoted links between various nations of Central and Eastern Europe and studied the peculiarities of that part of the continent. In 1938, he published his Polityka gospodarcza Niemiec hitlerowskich (Economical Policies of Nazi Germany) in which he was the first economist to compare the Nazi and the Soviet socialist economies. He was also a journalist on various newspapers, including the Kurier Wileński.

On 2 August 1939, he was mobilized in the Polish Army as a reserve officer. He took part in the Polish Defensive War, at the onset of World War II. After the Soviet invasion of Poland, his unit attempted to reach the Hungarian or Romanian borders to evade being captured and to find its way to France, where the Polish Army was being recreated. However, after the Battle of Krasnobród on 23 September, he was taken prisoner of war by the Soviets. Through the transfer camp in Putyvl, he was interned in the NKVD camp in Kozelsk, together with several thousand other Polish officers, professors, border guards and policemen. Swianiewicz spoke fluent Russian, which his interrogator, kombrig Vasili Mikhaylovich Zarubin, may have thought would make him useful. After the start of the Katyn Massacre in the spring of 1940, he was attached to a group of about 100 Polish officers being moved by train to a small station in Gniezdovo, near Katyn. There, all of his comrades were massed in buses with blindfolded windows and transported to the mass murder site, but Swianiewicz himself was withdrawn from the transport.

He was then transferred to the prison in Smolensk, the NKVD Lubyanka Prison, and then to Moscow's Butyrki Prison. After roughly a year of interrogation, his pre-war books on the Soviet economy were interpreted as espionage, for which he was sentenced to eight years in the gulag. Transported to Ust-Vym Camp in Komi Republic, he was released from the prison camp after the Sikorski-Mayski Agreement in August 1941. However, he was soon again arrested and sent back to the camp. After the intervention of numerous Polish politicians, he was finally released soon afterwards, and he joined the Polish Army, which was being formed by General Władysław Anders in the south of the Soviet Union. He was one of the first witnesses to inform the Polish authorities of the number of Polish prisoners-of-war held in Soviet camps until the spring of 1940. He remained in the Polish embassy in Moscow as one of the officials entrusted with searching for the roughly 22,000 missing Polish officers. He left Russia in July 1942 and reached the United Kingdom, where he remained active in the Polish government-in-exile. He was also co-author of The crime of Katyn; Facts & Documents; one of the first monographs on the mass murder of Polish officers by the Soviets, it was published in 1948.

After the war, he had to remain in exile in London and started giving lectures at numerous universities around the world, including the United States, Indonesia and Canada. He was a notable economist, and also testified at various occasions on the massacre. Since his family had to stay in Stalinist Poland, during the hearing before Madden Committee of the Congress, he testified in a mask and under a false name. He was also a professor at Saint Mary's University, Halifax, Nova Scotia.

In 1956, 18 years after their last meeting, his wife, Olimpia, was allowed to leave Poland and joined him in London. In the 1970s, he also became an active member of various organizations documenting and fighting against human rights abuses in Soviet bloc countries.

He never returned to Poland and spent his last years in an Antokol hotel in Chislehurst, Kent, near London, that was run by General Tadeusz Pełczyński and his wife. He died there on 22 May 1997 and was buried in Halifax, next to his wife.

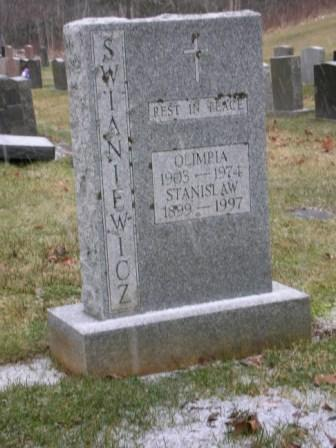
Grave of Stanisław Swianiewicz

They had four children. Witold Swianiewicz was the editor of the first edition of his father's W cieniu katynia. Maria Nagięć née Swianiewicz is a professor at the University of Warmia and Mazury, in Olsztyn. Witold also translated W cieniu katynia into English and published it under the title In the Shadow of Katyn: Stalin's Terror in 2002.

== Bibliography ==
- Stanisław Swianiewicz (1983) [1930]. Lenin jako ekonomista. Poznań, Głosy. p. 15.
- Stanisław Swianiewicz (1938). Polityka gospodarcza Niemiec hitlerowskich. Warsaw, Polityka. p. 278.
- The crime of Katyn; facts & documents. Zdzisław Stahl, Władysław Anders, Stanisław Swianiewicz, Józef Mackiewicz. London, Gryf. 1948. p. 303.
- Stanisław Swianiewicz (1965). Forced Labour and Economic Development; An Enquiry into the Experience of Soviet Industrialization. Oxford, Oxford University Press. p. 332. ISBN 0-313-24983-0.
- Stanisław Swianiewicz (1976). W cieniu Katynia. Paris, Instytut Literacki. p. 359. ISBN 2-7168-0027-8.
- Stanisław Swianiewicz (1996). Dzieciństwo i młodość. Warsaw, Jan Jacek Swianiewicz. p. 107. ISBN 83-86367-26-1.
- Gaziński, Benon, ed. (2010). Stanisław Swianiewicz (1899-1997): ekonomista, sowietolog, historyk (in Polish). Instytut Nauk Politycznych Uniwersytet Warminsko-Mazurski w Olsztynie. ISBN 978-83-89559-02-9.
- File-folder Stanislaw Swianiewicz. University Archive, Saint Mary's University Patrick Power Library, Halifax, Nova Scotia, Canada.
