= Ss. Boris and Gleb Cathedral, Daugavpils =

Orthodox church in Daugavpils, Latvia

Coordinates: 55°52′14.55″N 26°32′16.43″E

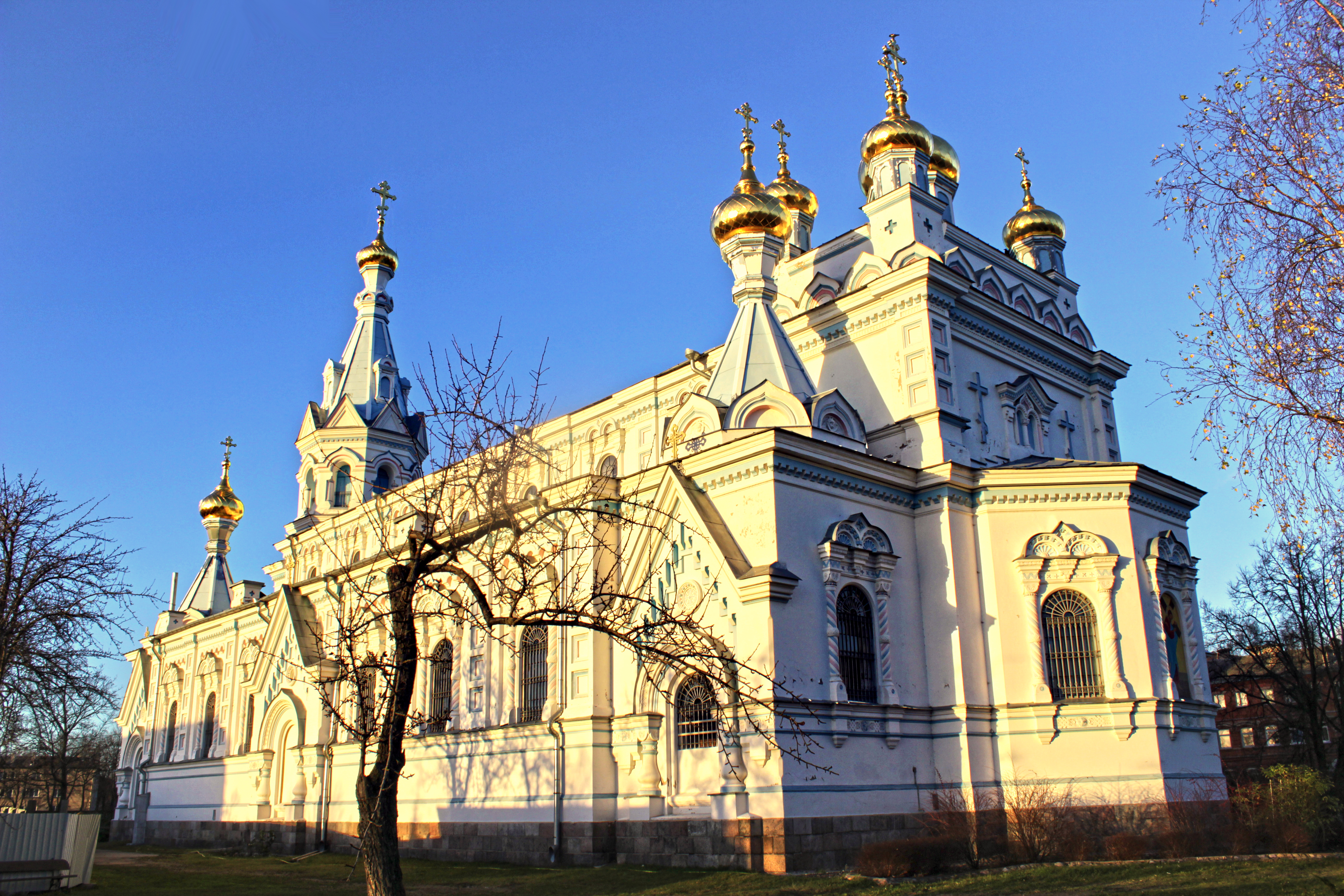
Ss. Boris and Gleb Cathedral

The Saints Boris and Gleb Cathedral (Russian: Борисоглебский собор, (Note: The full Russian name reads as Даугавпилсский православный кафедральный собор святых благоверных князей Бориса и Глеба.) Latvian: Svēto Borisa un Gļeba pareizticīgo katedrāle) is the main Orthodox church in Daugavpils, Latvia. It can hold 5,000 people, being the biggest Orthodox church in Latvia.

The cathedral is situated in Jaunbūve (Novoye Stroyenie) neighbourhood on the Church hill (Baznīckalns, Церковная горка), along with the Immaculate Conception Catholic Church, the Martin Luther Lutheran Cathedral, and the House of Prayer of Daugavpils First Old Believers' Community.

== History ==
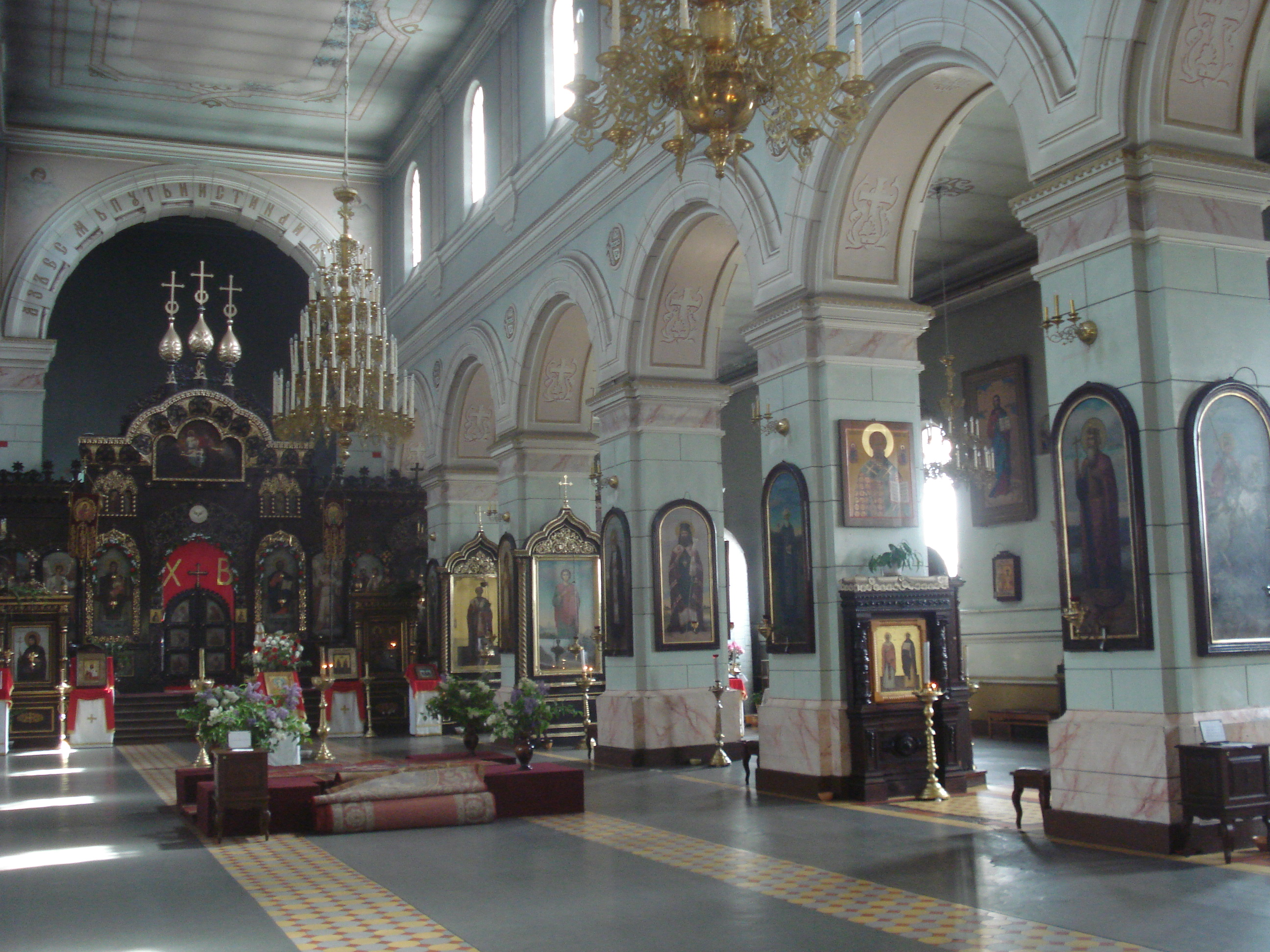
Cathedral's interior

A previous church on the site was built in 1866 by the order of the Governor-General of the Northwestern Krai Konstantin von Kaufman for the needs of the local garrison and was consecrated in honour of the emperor Constantine I and his mother Helena. Usually referred to as the Iron church (Железная церковь, Dzelzs baznīca) because of its external cladding, it was dismantled and rebuilt at Tsargrad (now Jersika), where it still remains, following the decision to build a new garrison cathedral at the original site.

The contemporary church was built in 1904–1905, the construction work being financed by the military. It was consecrated on 25 July [O.S. 12 July] 1905 in honour of the Holy Righteous Princes and Passion-bearers Boris and Gleb and Saint Alexius, Metropolitan of Moscow.

== Architecture ==
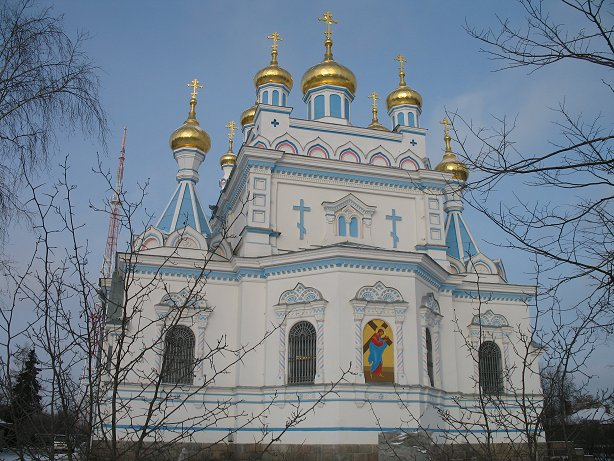
View of the apse

The church was built in the Neo-Russian style. It is a three-aisled masonry church, which on the plan forms an oblong rectangular with a polygonal apse and resembles a ship. The cathedral has ten towers with gilded cupolas. The interiors include murals and ceiling pieces.

It has been suggested that the icons on the oak iconostasis in the cathedral are copies of works by Viktor Vasnetsov in St Volodymyr's Cathedral, Kyiv.

== See also ==
- List of largest Eastern Orthodox church buildings

== Literature ==
- Kaminska, R.; Bistere, A. (2006). Sakrālās arhitektūras un mākslas mantojums Daugavpils rajonā [The heritage of religious architecture and art in Daugavpils district] (in Latvian, English, and Russian). Riga: Neputns. ISBN 9984-729-90-7.
