= Grigorijs Ņemcovs =

Latvian journalist, businessman and politician

Ņemcovs

Grigorijs Ņemcovs (Russian: Григорий Владимирович Немцов, Grigory Nemtsov; 11 December 1948 – 16 April 2010) was a Latvian journalist, businessman and politician (deputy mayor of Daugavpils). He began his career in Daugavpils city council. He published a regional newspaper (Million) and owned a local television station.

== Biography ==
Ņemcovs founded Latvia's largest regional Russian-language newspaper, Million, in 1995. The paper has covered political and local government corruption and mismanagement.

He was the founder of the society movement Latgales Tauta (Nation of Latgale). In 2007, death threats were made against Ņemcovs, and his house was burned down. The arsonists have not been identified. He was also physically attacked in 2000 by unidentified assailants who took his passport.

On 16 April 2010, Ņemcovs was shot twice in the head at close range when he went to a meeting in a café. The murder appeared to have been carefully planned and executed. The gunman seemed to have been following Ņemcovs when he arrived at a café on Lāčplēša iela near the University of Daugavpils. He was already dead when emergency services arrived at the scene. He was 61 years old.
