= Kaspars Petrovs =

Latvian serial killer

- Born: 1978 (age 47–48); Grobiņa, Latvia
- Convictions: 12 May 2005
- Penalty: Life

Details
- Victims: 13, possibly 38
- Span of crimes: 2000–2003
- Country: Latvia
- Date apprehended: February 2003

Kaspars Petrovs (born 1978) is a Latvian serial killer. He was convicted of the murder of thirteen elderly women by the Riga Regional Court on 12 May 2005 and sentenced to life in prison.

Petrovs, the son of a prominent medical doctor, had been homeless for several years. Initially held in connection with the murders of five women in February 2003, he later confessed to killing more than thirty women. He was initially charged with 38 murders, 8 attempted murders, and a number of thefts and robberies, mostly involving elderly female residents of Riga, Latvia between 2000 and 2003. However, authorities only pursued charges in the deaths of 13 of the victims due to a lack of forensic evidence in the other cases.

Petrovs, who had a previous conviction for theft in 1998, maintained after his arrest and during his 2005 trial that he had not "intended to kill his victims, but only to rob them". Petrovs strangled the women after following them home and forcibly entering their apartments or posing as a Latvijas gāze (state gas company) employee. Petrovs stole an estimated 18,000 lats (26,000 euros) in goods and money from his victims.

After his conviction, Petrovs apologized to his victims' families in court and asked for their forgiveness. "I cannot return the victims to life by words, but I wish they were still alive, that nothing had happened..."

== See also ==
- List of serial killers by country
- List of serial killers by number of victims
