= Gulbene district =

District of Latvia

Coordinates: 57°10′21″N 26°45′40″E

Gulbene
- District
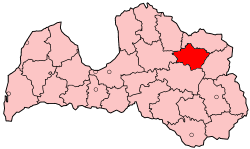
- Country: Latvia

Area
  - Total: 1,873 km^{2} (723 sq mi)

Population
  - Total: 28,998
  - Density: 15.48/km^{2} (40.10/sq mi)
- Website: gulbene.lv/

Gulbene district (Latvian: Gulbenes rajons) was an administrative division of Latvia, located in the Vidzeme region, in the country's north-east. It was organized into a city and thirteen parishes, each with a local government authority. The main city in the district was Gulbene.

In Gulbene, a Baltic single passage narrow-gauge railroad, Gulbene-Aluksne, was renovated and started to operate in 2005.

Gulbene has a basketball team, ASK/Buki-Gulbene.

Districts were eliminated during the administrative-territorial reform in 2009.

== Cities and parishes of the Gulbene district ==
- Beļava Parish
- Dauksti Parish
- Druviena Parish
- Galgauska Parish
- Gulbene city
- Litene Parish
- Lizums Parish
- Līgo Parish
- Lejasciems Parish
- Jaungulbene Parish
- Stāmeriena Parish
- Ranka Parish
- Stradi Parish
- Tirza Parish
