= Jaungulbene =

Village in Latvia

- Village
- Jaungulbene's location in Latvia
- Coordinates: 57°4′8.01″N 26°35′59.50″E
- Country: Latvia
- Municipality: Gulbene
- Parish: Jaungulbene

Population (2006)
  - Total: 690
- Postal code: LV-4420

Jaungulbene (German: Neu-Schwanenburg) is a village in the Jaungulbene Parish of Gulbene Municipality in the Vidzeme region of Latvia.

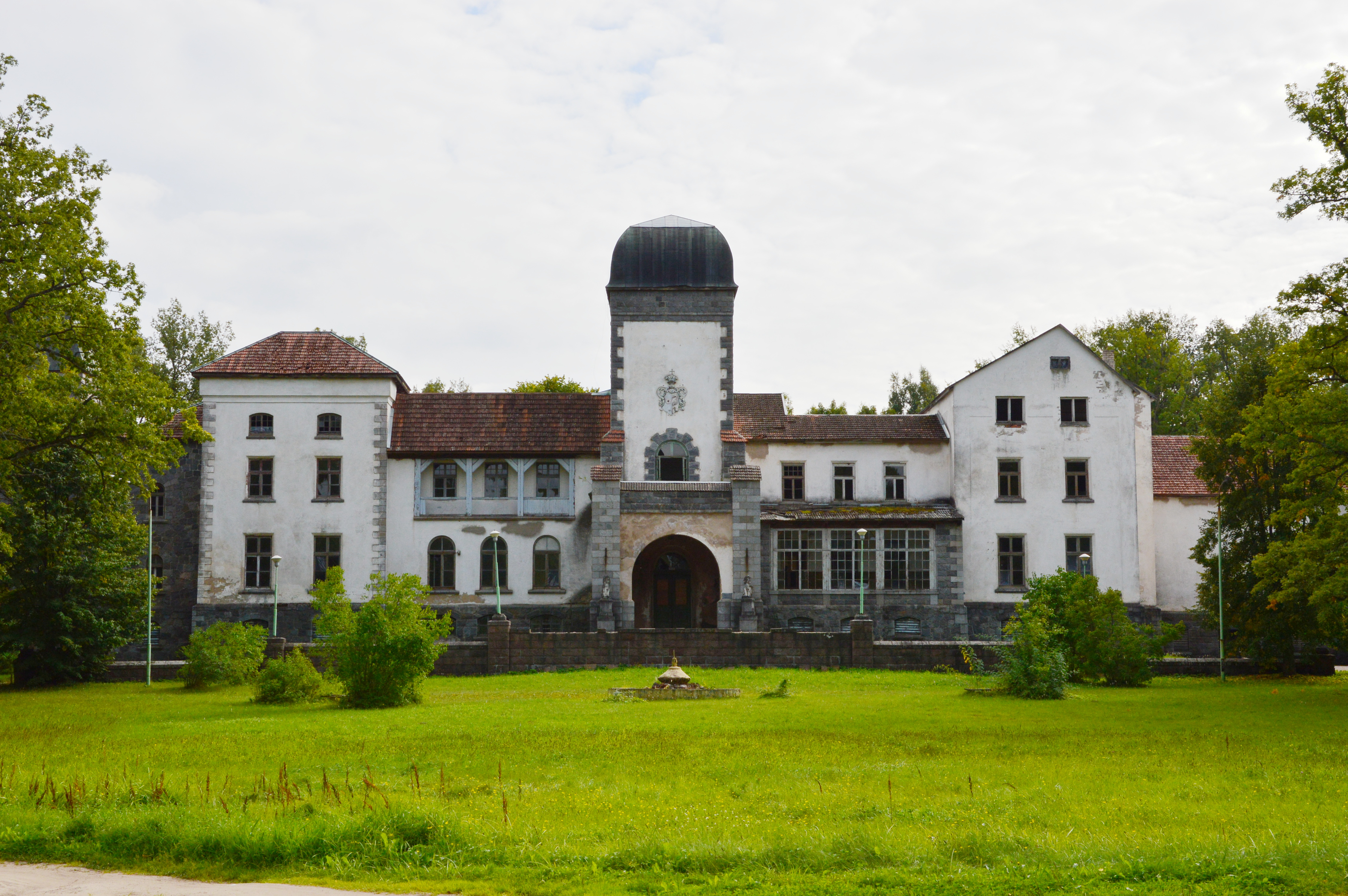

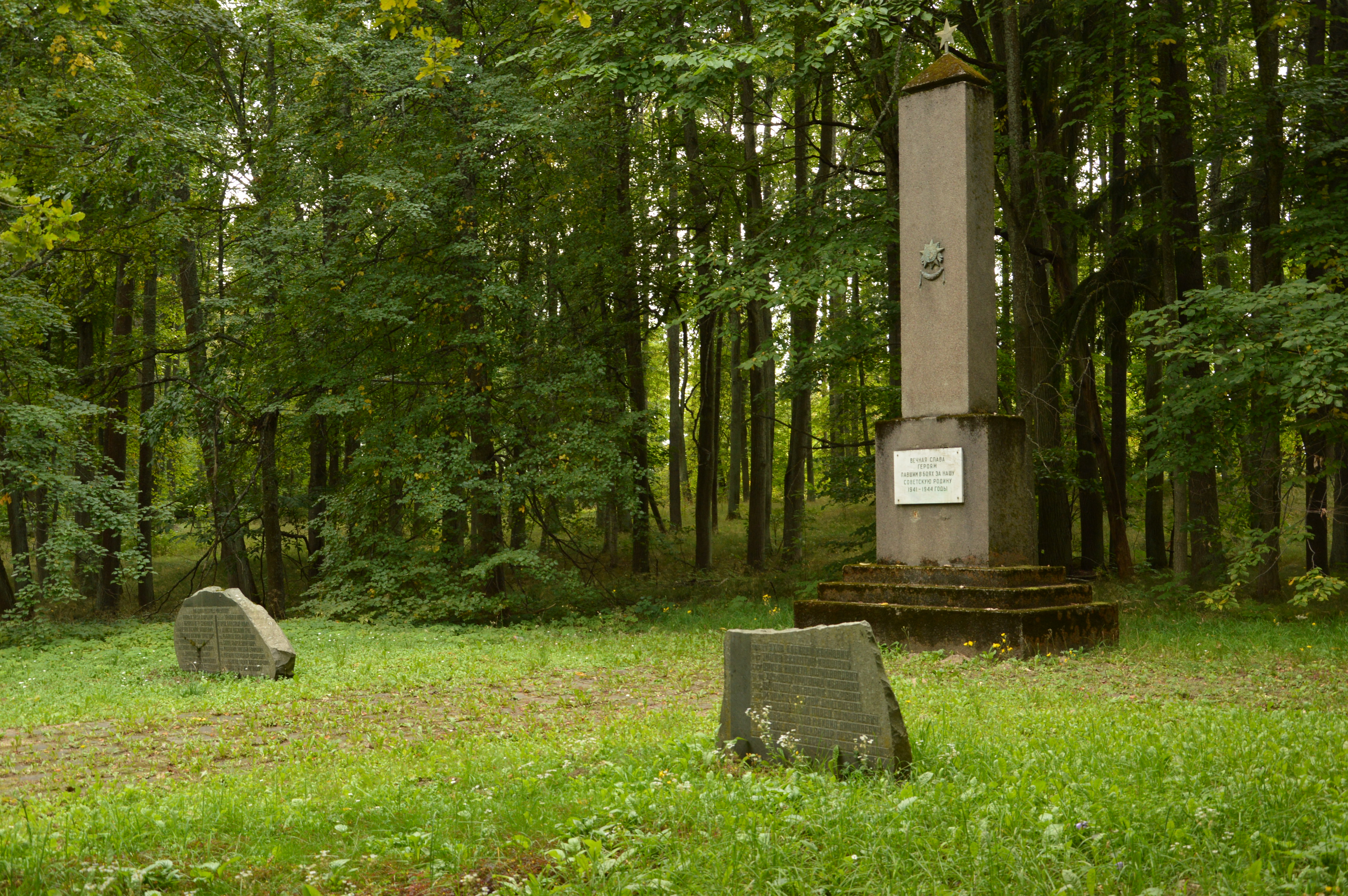

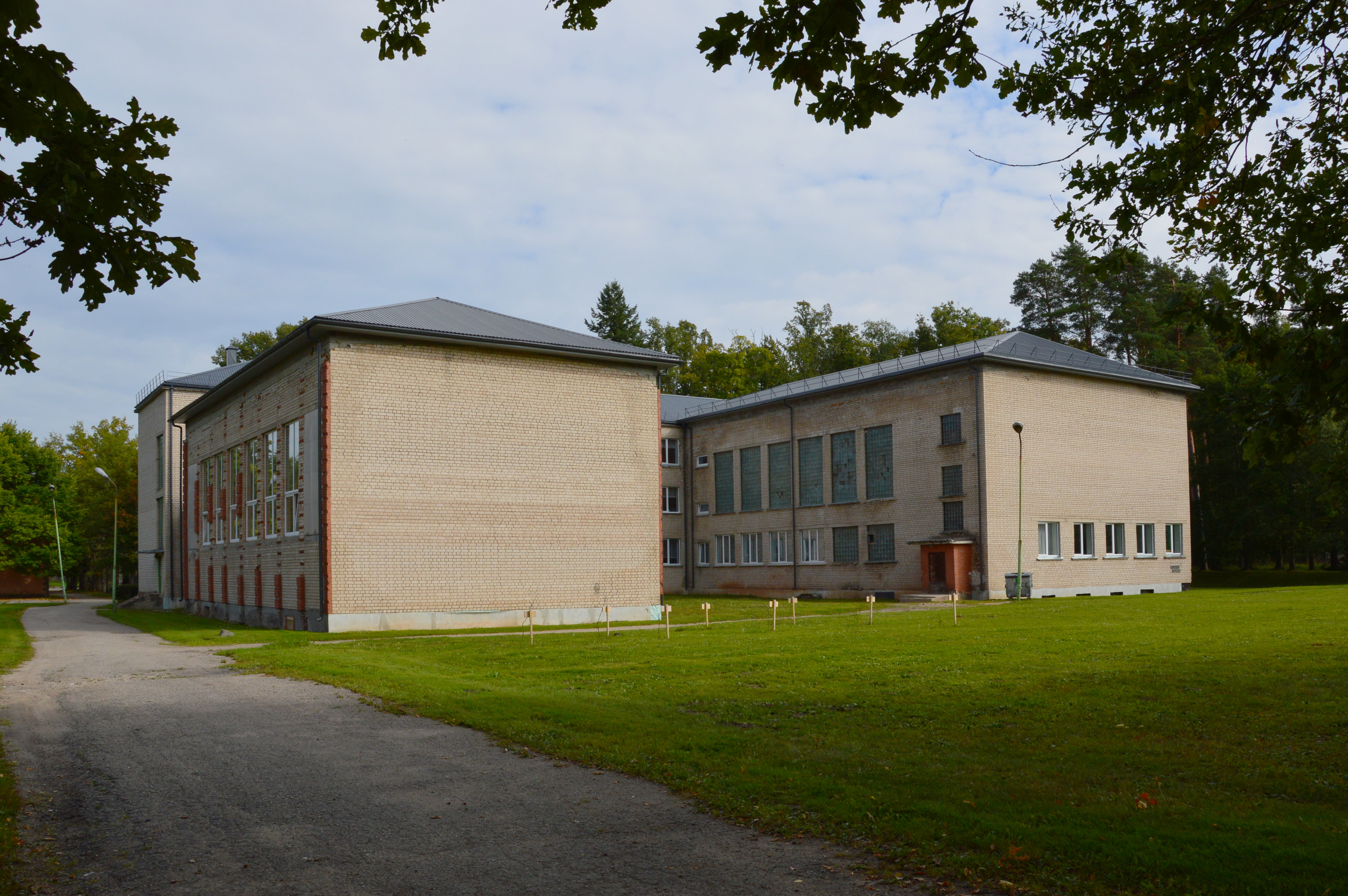

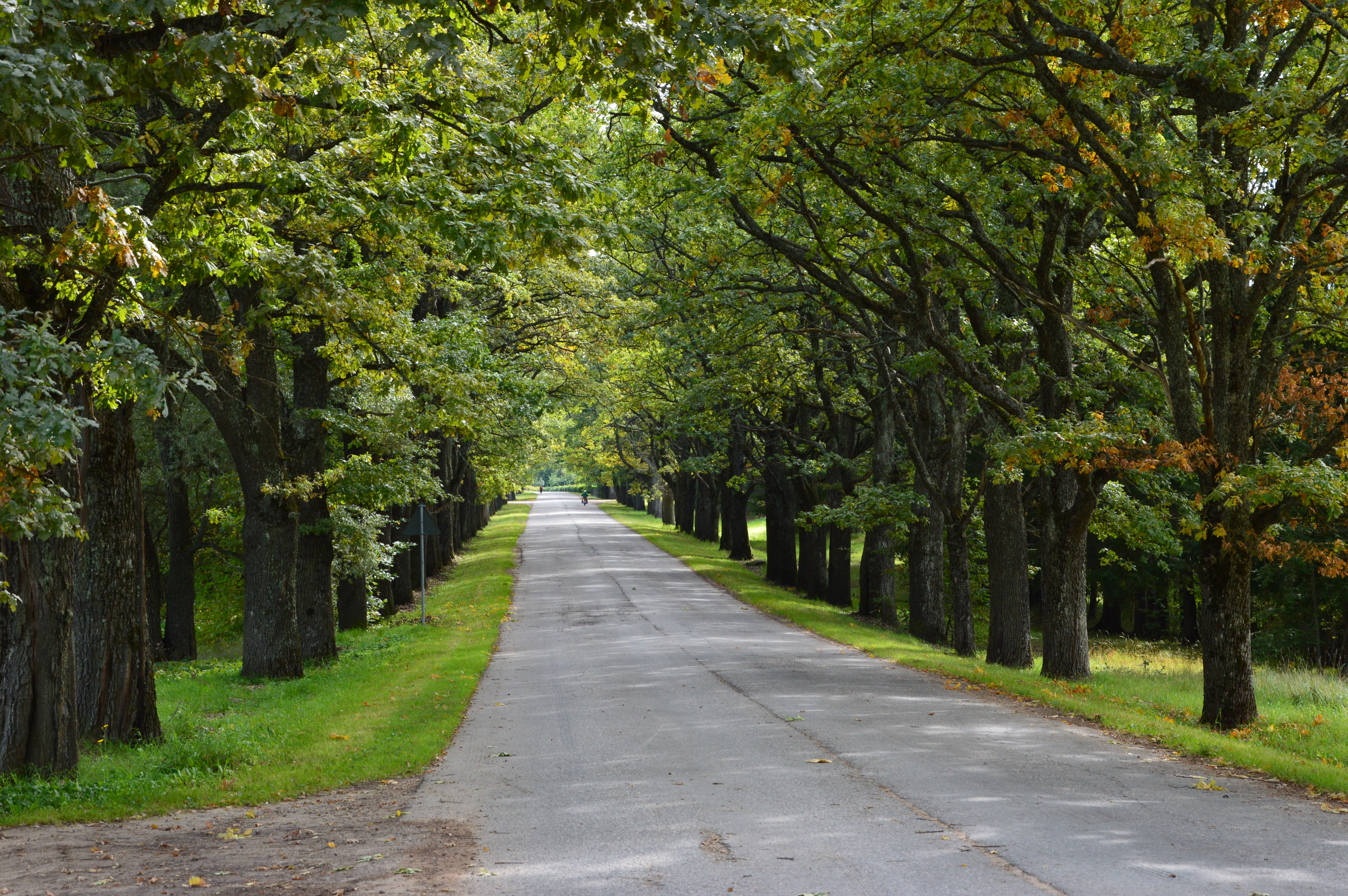

== See also ==
- Jaungulbene Manor
