= Uldis Pūcītis =

- Born: 15 April 1937; Ranka parish, Latvia
- Died: 14 December 2000 (aged 63); Riga, Latvia
- Occupations: actor, director
- Years active: 1959–2000
- Spouse: Olīvija Pūcīte
- Children: Milēna Gulbe-Kavace

Uldis Pūcītis (15 April 1937 – 14 December 2000) was a Latvian television, theater and film actor, scriptwriter and film director.

== Early life and stage career ==
Uldis Pūcītis was born in Ranka parish, Gulbene district to Jānis Pūcītis and his wife Anna Pūcīte. After graduating from school in Ranka he continued his studies in Riga and studied at the Latvian State Conservatory, graduating in 1959. Following his graduation, he worked as schoolteacher in the town of Aizpute for four years while engaged at the Liepāja Theater from 1960 to 1972, the Dailes Theater from 1964 to 1973 and the Youth Theatre from 1962 to 1964 and again from 1973 until 1992.

== Film career ==
Pūcītis made his film debut in a small role as a fisherman in the 1959 Ada Neretniece-directed Latvian language Soviet film Svešiniece ciemā (English release title: Stranger in the Village) before his first starring role opposite Latvian actress Vija Artmane in the Leonīds Leimanis-directed period-drama Purva bridējs, a film adaptation of the novel of the same name by Latvian writer Rūdolfs Blaumanis. He would go on to appear in a number of film and television roles throughout the 1960s and into the 1990s, as well as continuing his stage career.

In 1998, Pūcītis would write the script and co-direct the television mini-series Izpostītā ligzda for Latvijas Televīzija (LTV) with Armands Zvirbulis. The film and both Zvirbulis and Pūcītis would be awarded the Lielais Kristaps; the highest prize awarded for Latvian cinema.

== Personal life and death ==
Pūcītis was married to Olīvija Pūcīte (née Poselanova). Their daughter is actress Milēna Gulbe-Kavace, and grandson is professional tennis player Ernests Gulbis. In late 2000, Pūcītis fell ill at his summer home in Jūrmala. After being taken to the hospital in Riga, he was initially diagnosed with a stomach ulcer. However, he died in hospital of a pulmonary embolism and was buried at the Riga Forest Cemetery.

== Selected filmography ==
- Es visu atceros, Ričard! (English: I Remember Everything, Richard) (1966) - Edgars
- Dead Mountaineer's Hotel (1979) - Inspector Peter Glebsky

== Awards ==
- Latvian SSR State Prize (1989)
- Lielais Kristaps (1998)
