= Litene =

Village in Latvia

Coordinates: 57°11′N 27°02′E

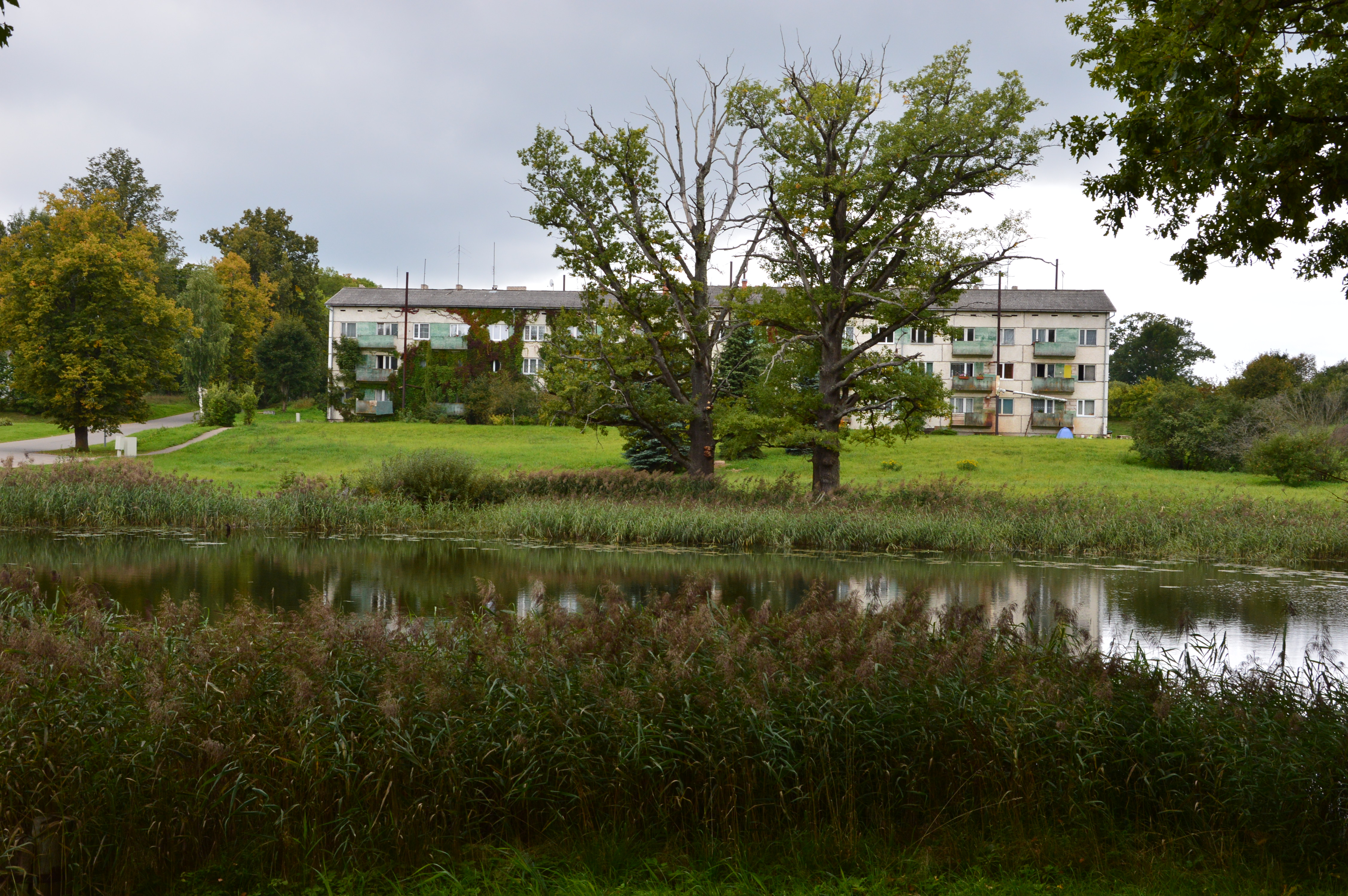
Litene

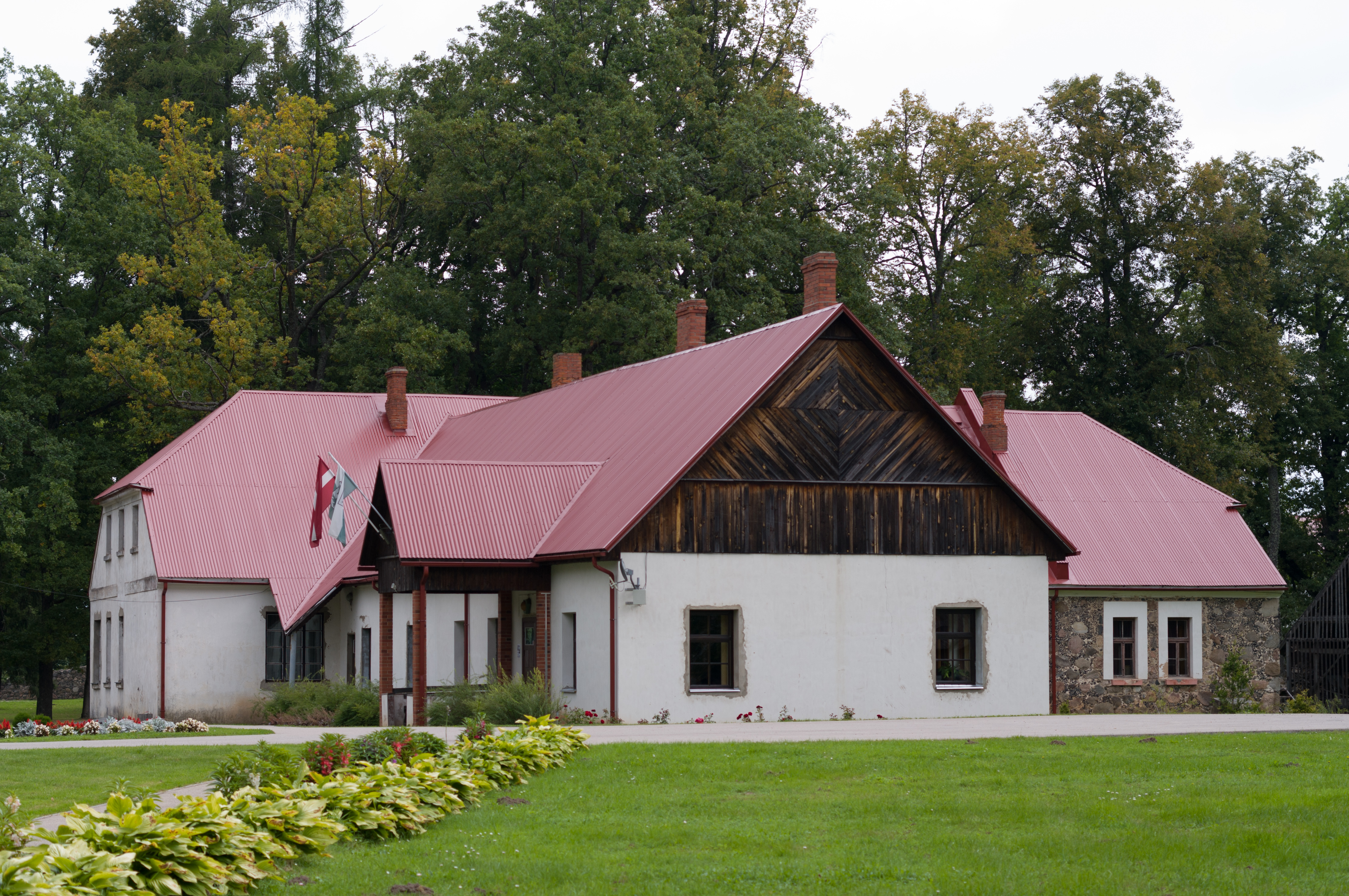
Litene manor house

Litene (German: Lettin) is the center of the Litene Parish of Gulbene Municipality in the Vidzeme region of Latvia. Other names: Lytene, Myza Lytene. A notable building is Litene Manor.

== History ==
Litene became infamous in the summer of 1941, the "year of terror" of the Soviet occupation. Eleven hundred Latvian army officers were arrested by the Soviet NKVD in 1941. For it was at Litene Army camp that most of them were arrested under the pretext of a "training exercise". Two hundred Latvian officers were shot in Litene, 80 in Riga and 560 were deported to Siberian gulags. Only 90 of them returned from Siberia after Joseph Stalin's death.

In the spring of 1941, units of the disbanded Latvian Army now called the 24th Territorial Corps of the Red Army were sent for summer training to the former Latvian Army base at Litene. On 14 June 1941, the remaining officers, while on a supposed training mission, were disarmed, arrested and deported to forced labor at Norillag, north of the Arctic Circle in Siberia, where they were sentenced to death or long-term imprisonment.

In 1988, excavation was undertaken at the former Latvian Army summer camp in Litene. The excavators uncovered the remains of 11 individuals, evidently officers of the 24th Territorial Corps.

During commemoration ceremonies on 14 June 2001 at Litene fraternal cemetery Latvian Defence Minister Ģirts Valdis Kristovskis unveiled a memorial to the Latvian officers killed in 1941.

== List of Latvian Army officers killed at Litene ==
- First Lieutenant Fridrichs Feldmanis; according to the Central Archive of the Russian Ministry of Defence, Senior Lieutenant Feldmanis was shot dead while trying to escape between August 1 and 10, 1941. The last place of his military service is shown as 183 Infantry Division of the Red Army.

== Litene tragedy in music and art ==
- Litene : ballad for 12-voiced chorus, composed by Pēteris Vasks to a text by Uldis Bērziņš (1993). ISMN M-001-10158-5 EAN 7318590011454

== See also ==
- Mass graves in the Soviet Union
- NKVD prisoner massacres
- Occupation and annexation of the Baltic states by the Soviet Union (1940)
