= Litene Manor =

Manor house in Latvia

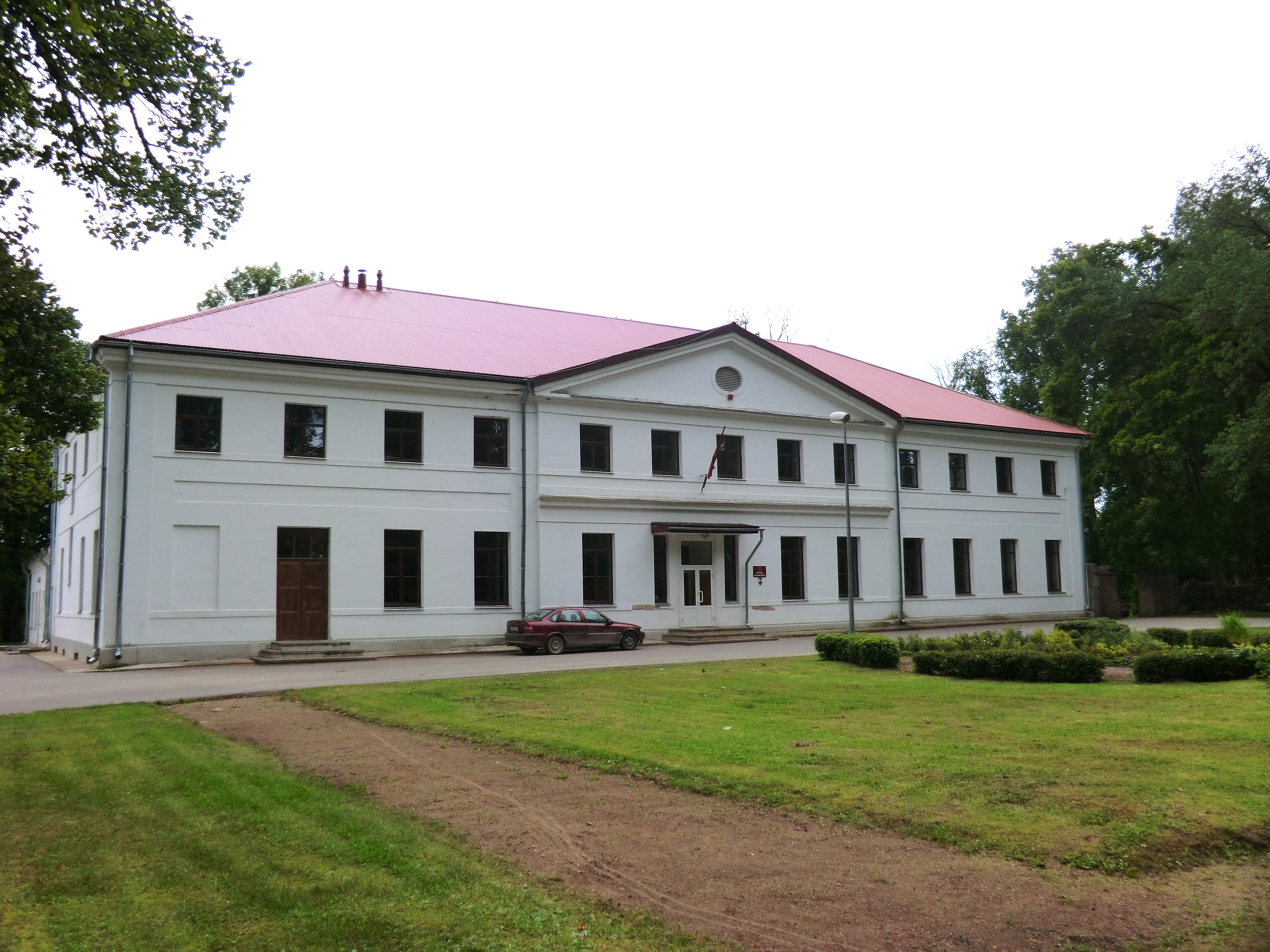
- Interactive map of the Litene Manor area

General information
- Architectural style: Classicism
- Location: Gulbene municipality, Latvia
- Coordinates: 57°11′29″N 27°01′44″E
- Construction started: 1817
- Completed: 1819
- Client: Otto von Wolff

Litene Manor (Latvian: Litenes muižas pils) is a manor house in Litene parish, in the historical region of Vidzeme, in northern Latvia. It was built during the first half of the 19th century in Classical style for Baron Otto von Wolff on the banks of the Pededze. Manor was burned down during revolution of 1905 but was later restored in simplified forms. After Latvian agrarian reforms in 1921 manor house was nationalized and lands partitioned. Since 1924, building houses the Litene Primary School. By the decision of the Gulbene Municipality Council, Litene Primary School is closed from September 1, 2018.

== See also ==
- List of palaces and manor houses in Latvia
