= Jaungulbene Manor =

Manor house in Latvia

Coordinates: 57.0605°N 26.5963°E

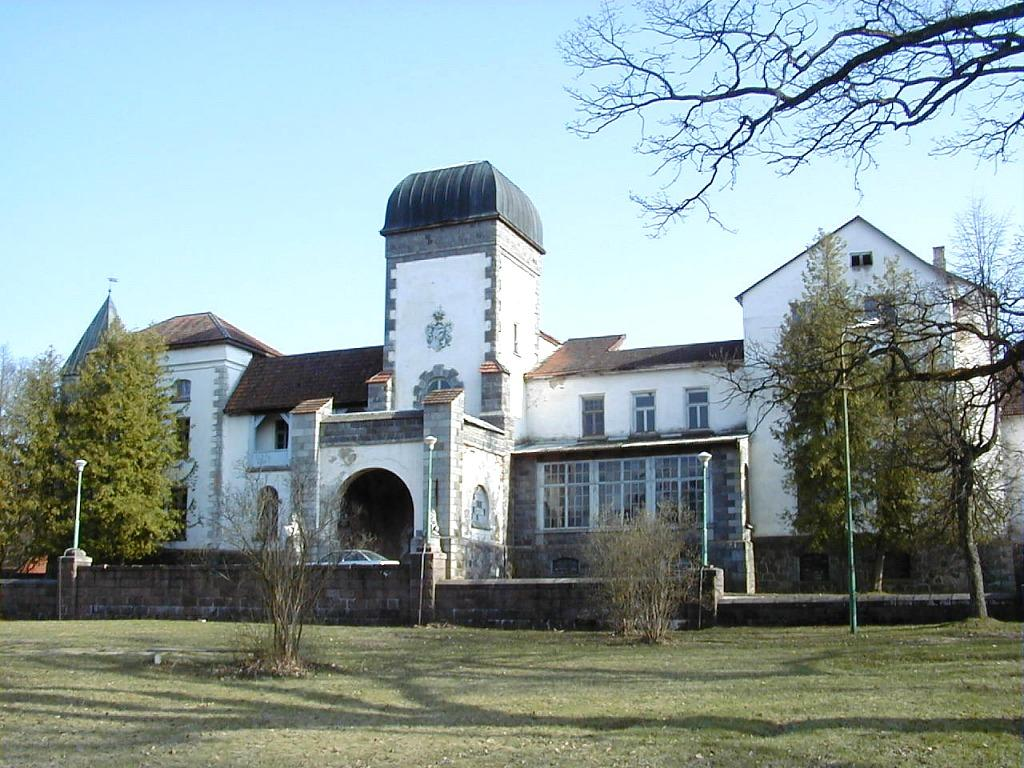
- Interactive map of the Jaungulbene Manor area

General information
- Architectural style: Tudor Neo-Gothic
- Location: Gulbene Municipality, Latvia
- Completed: 1878; 148 years ago
- Client: Otto Wilhelm Leopold von Transehe

Jaungulbene Manor (Latvian: Jaungulbenes muižas pils; German: Schloss Neu-Schwanenburg) is a manor house in the Jaungulbene Parish of Gulbene Municipality in the Vidzeme region of Latvia. It was built in Tudor neo-Gothic style and completed in 1878. In the 1920s Jaungulbene Manor was nationalized in accordance with Latvian Land Reform of 1920. From 1927 until the 1990s the building housed an agricultural school.

== Gallery ==
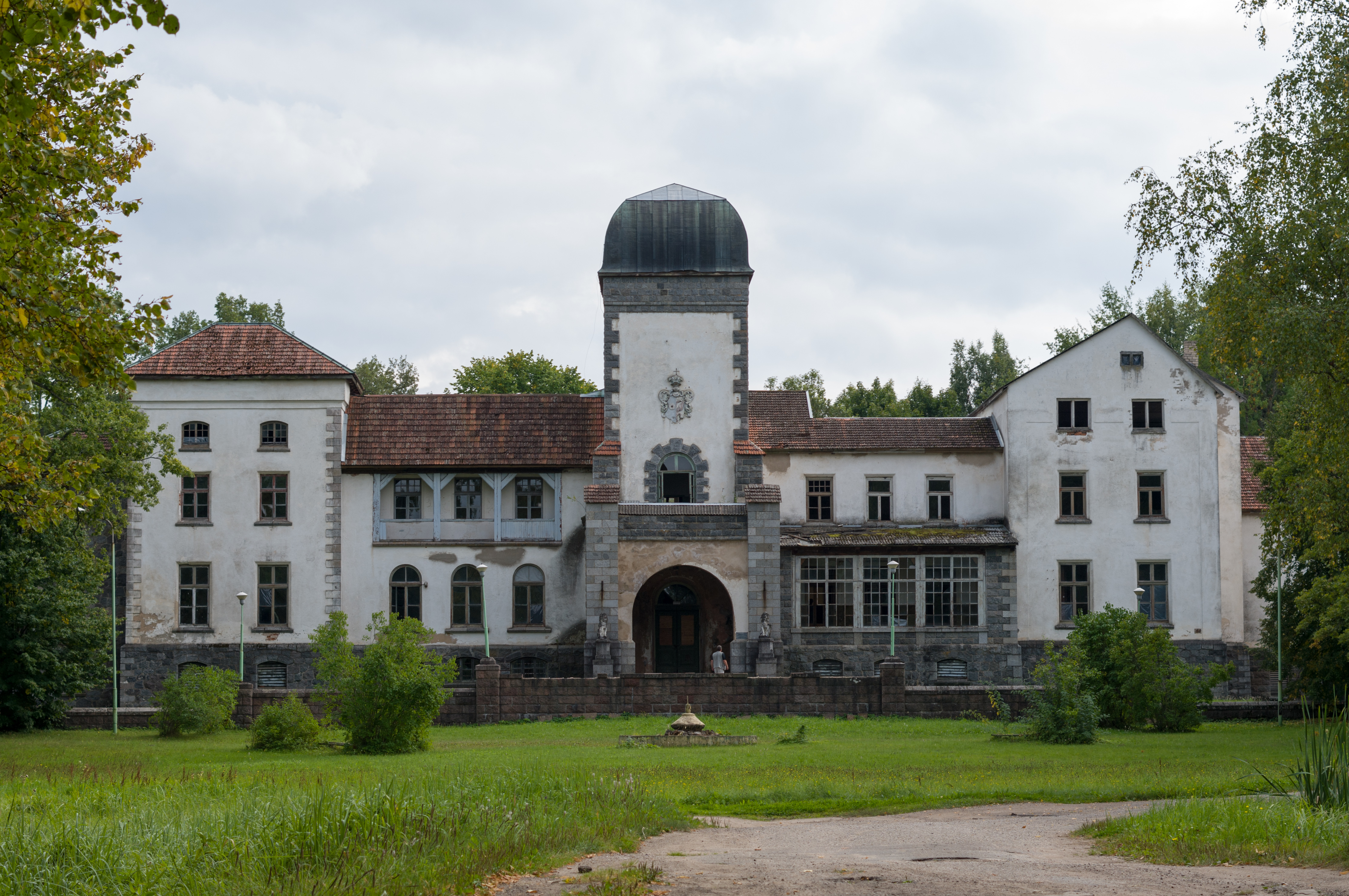

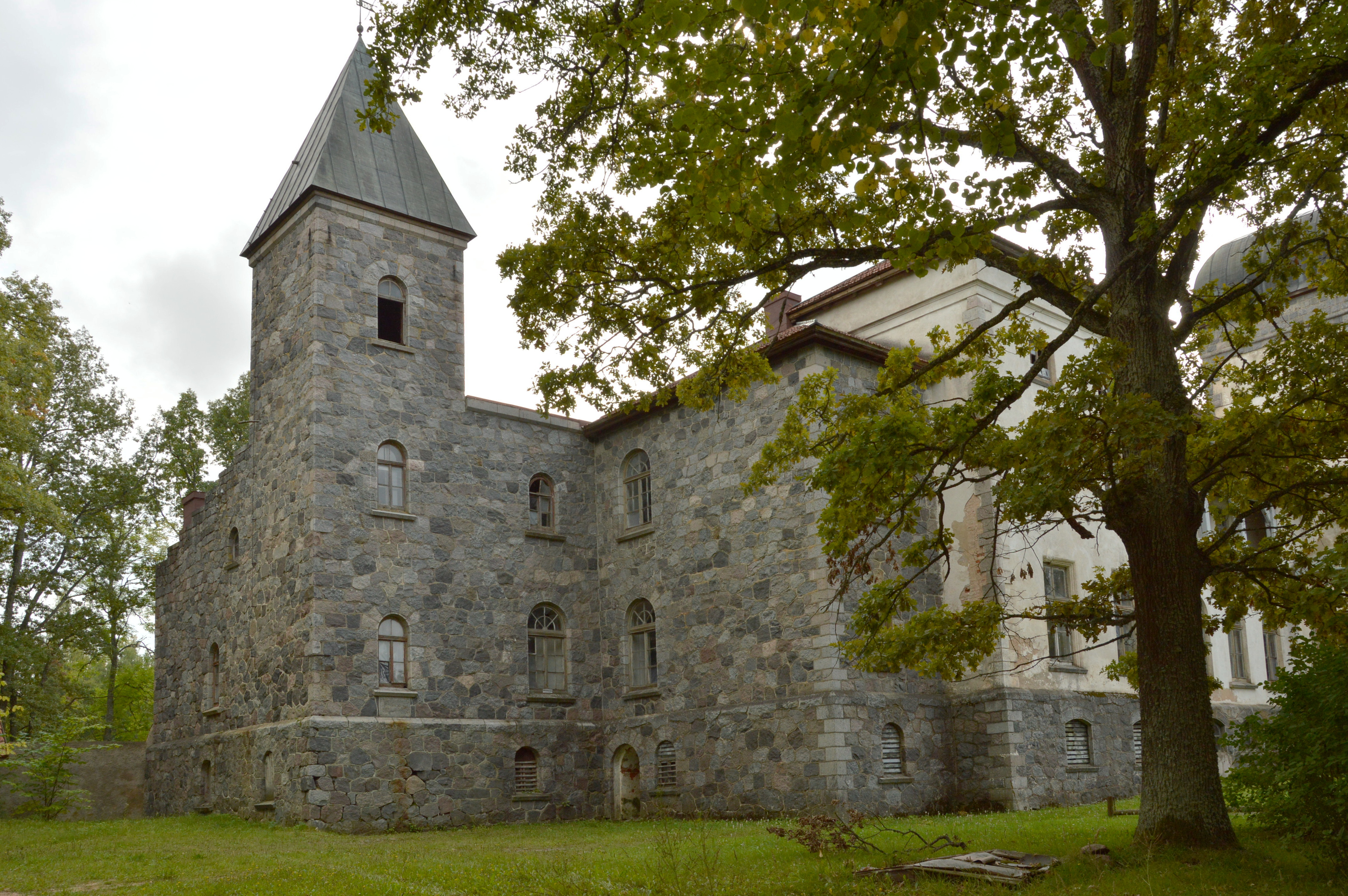

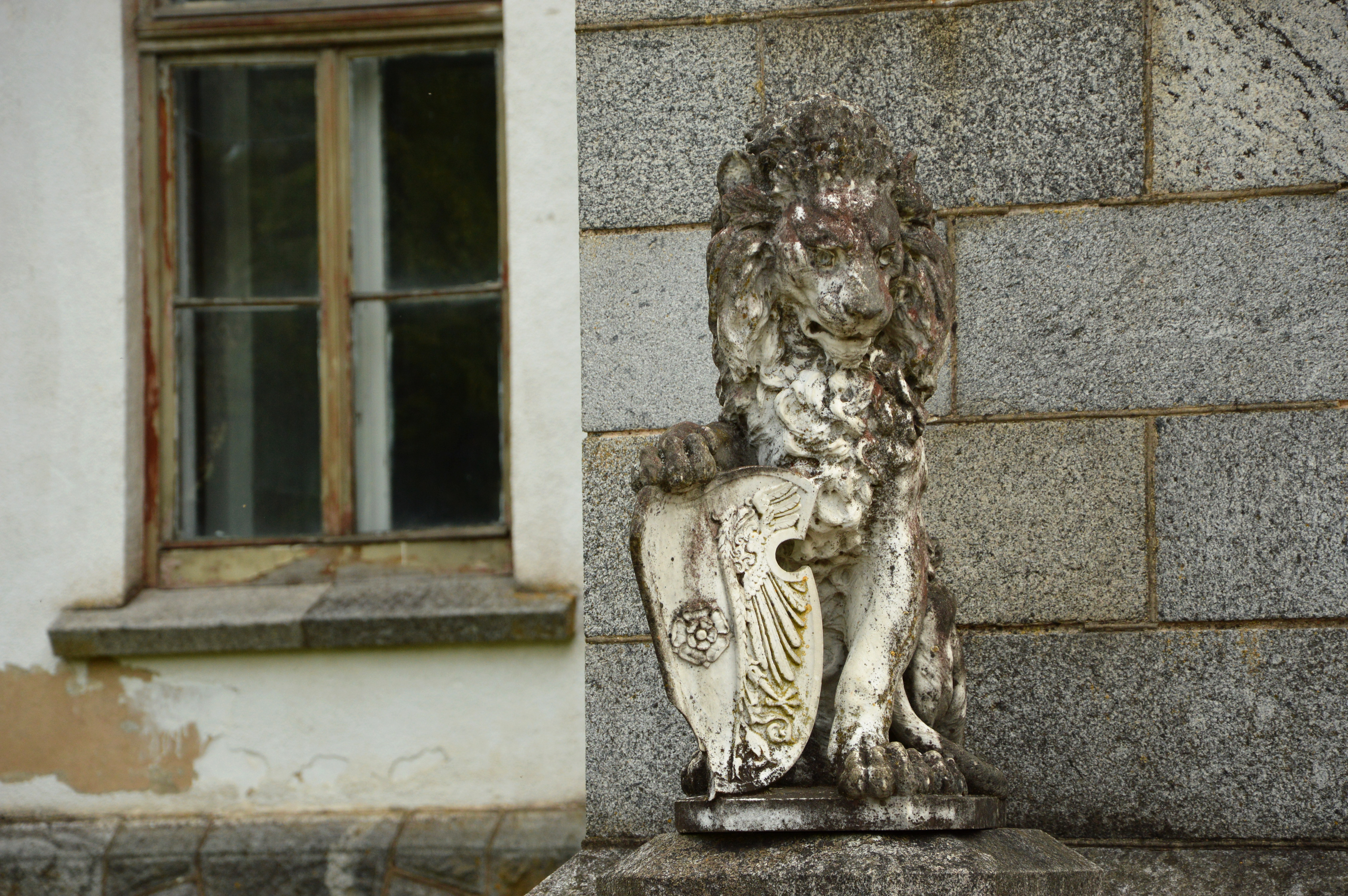

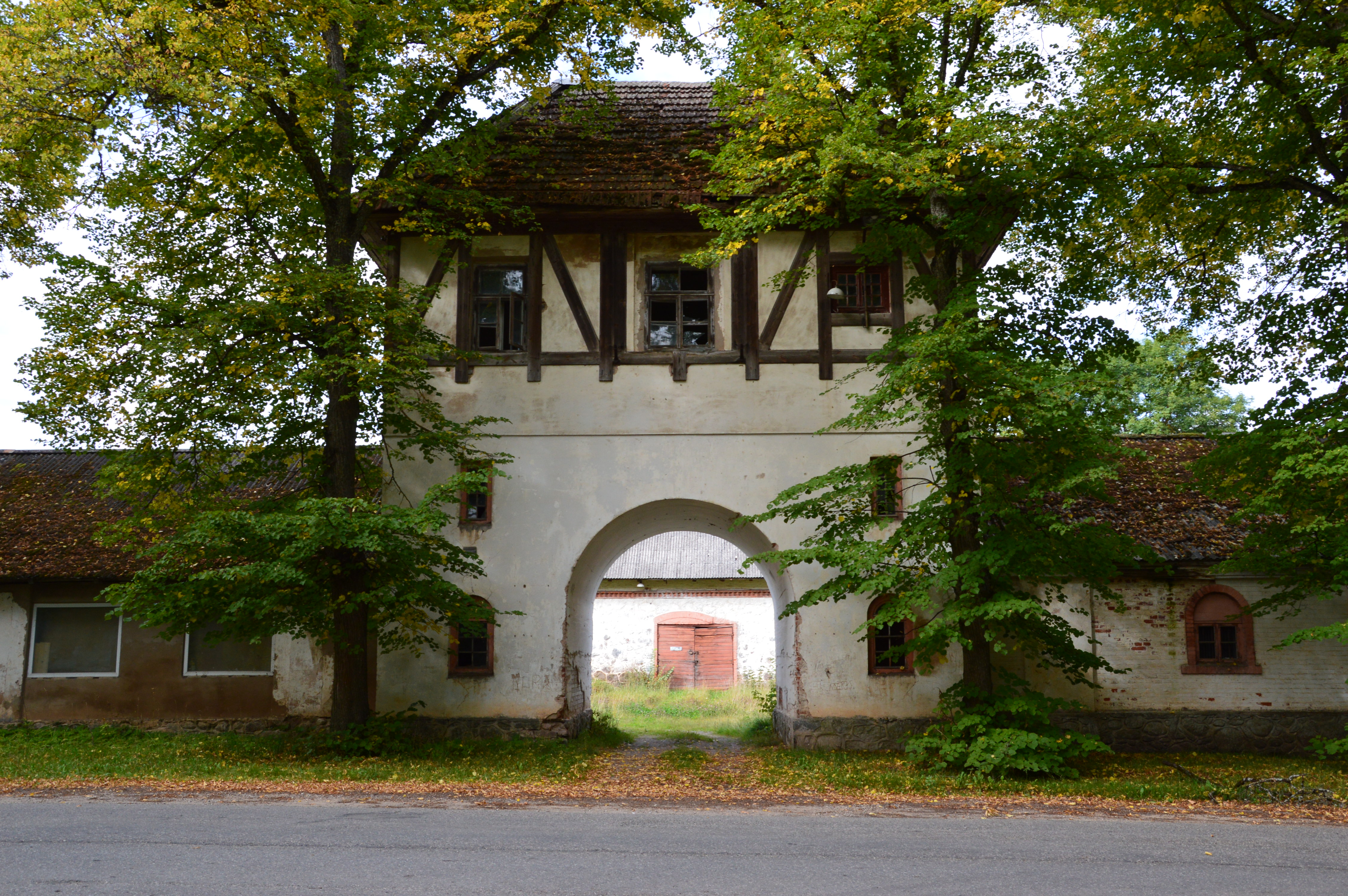

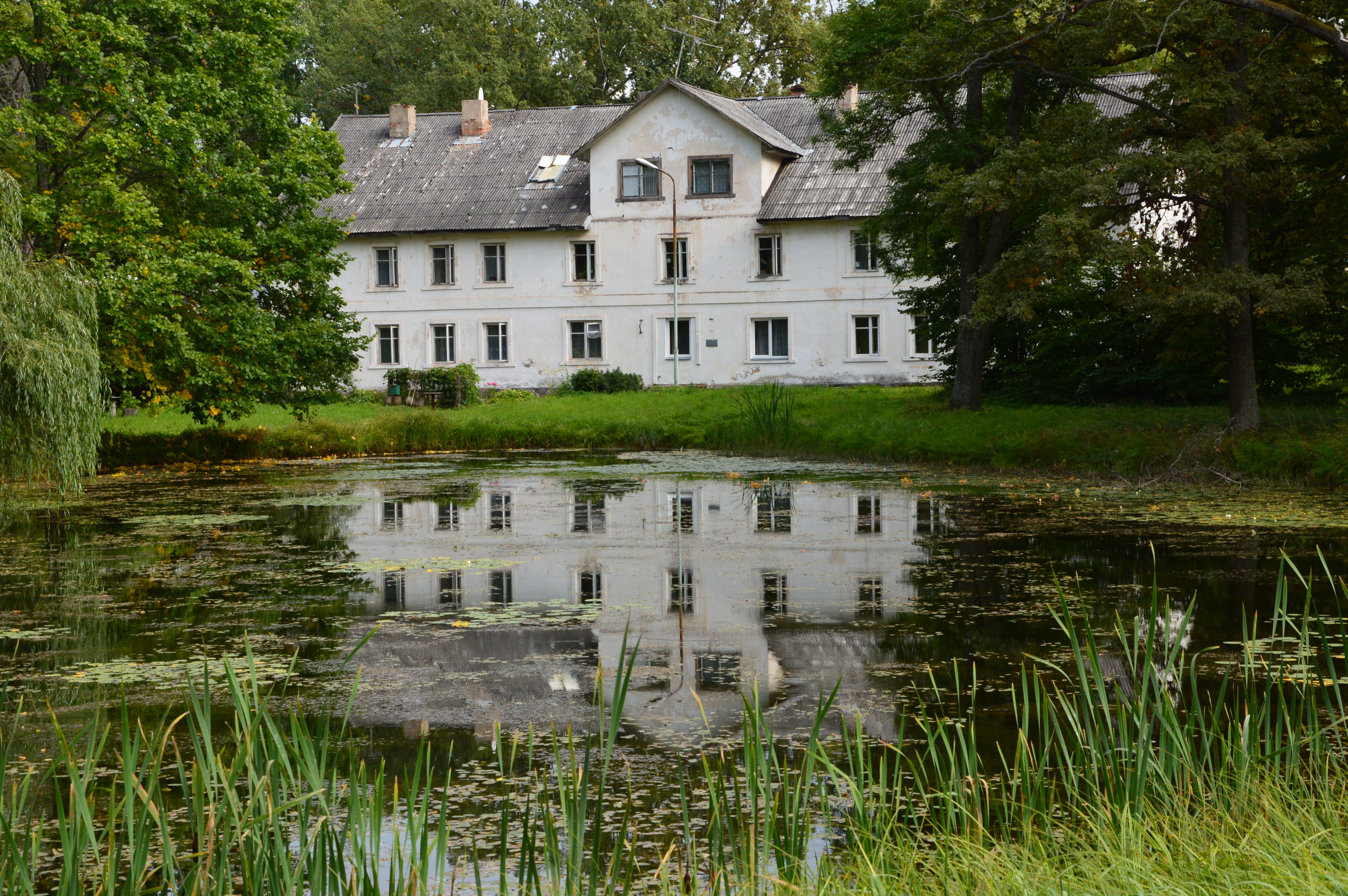

== See also ==
- List of palaces and manor houses in Latvia
