= Anna Sakse =

Latvian writer and translator

- Born: January 16, 1905; Lejasciema parish, Governorate of Livonia, Russian Empire
- Died: March 2, 1981 (aged 76); Riga, Latvian SSR, Soviet Union
- Occupation: Writer

Anna Sakse (January 16, 1905 – March 2, 1981) was a Latvian writer and translator. She also wrote under the names Austra Sēja, Smīns, Trīne Grēciņa and Zane Mežadūja.

Anna Sakse was born in 1905. She was born into a poor farming family in Vidzeme and studied teaching and Baltic philology at the University of Riga but left without completing a degree. Sakse next worked at translation and proofreading for various publications. She married Edgars Abzalons. In 1934, she joined the Communist Party, then illegal. At the start of World War II, she left for Russia. During this time, she was editor of the Latvian communist journal Cīņa. She returned to Latvia in 1944 at the same time as the Soviet army entered the country. In 1965, she was awarded the title People's Writer of the Latvian SSR. Her works have been translated in several eastern European and Asian languages.

The first publication was the poem "The Dream of God" in the newspaper Tukums News in 1925. During the Latvian SSR, she propagated communist ideology, glorified collectivization (novel "Against Mountain"), criticized pre-war universities and literary classics (novel "Sparks at night"), condemned Nazism in journalism. Next to ideological work she also wrote in humorous satirical compositions (collection «Thrown Zars»). In the final phase of her work, she focused on literary fairy tales (in the collection "Blacksmith Kaspars", "Fairy Tales of Flowers"), adding the literary fairy tale traditions with new features and images. Several works have been translated into Russian, German, Estonian, Uzbek.

== Death and legacy ==
Anna Sakse died in 1981.

Sakse has streets named after her in Riga, Babite, Mārupe and Lejasciems, Gulbene district. In 2022, the Gulbene Municipality began to create Anna Saks' Ceriņš Park in Lejasciems to honor the politician and literary figure.

== Selected works ==
- Dzirksteles naktī (Sparks in the Night), novel (2 volumes) (1951-1957)
- Pasakas par ziediem (Tales about flowers), fairy tales (1966)
