= Lizums Manor =

Manor house in Latvia

Coordinates: 57.1916°N 26.3780°E

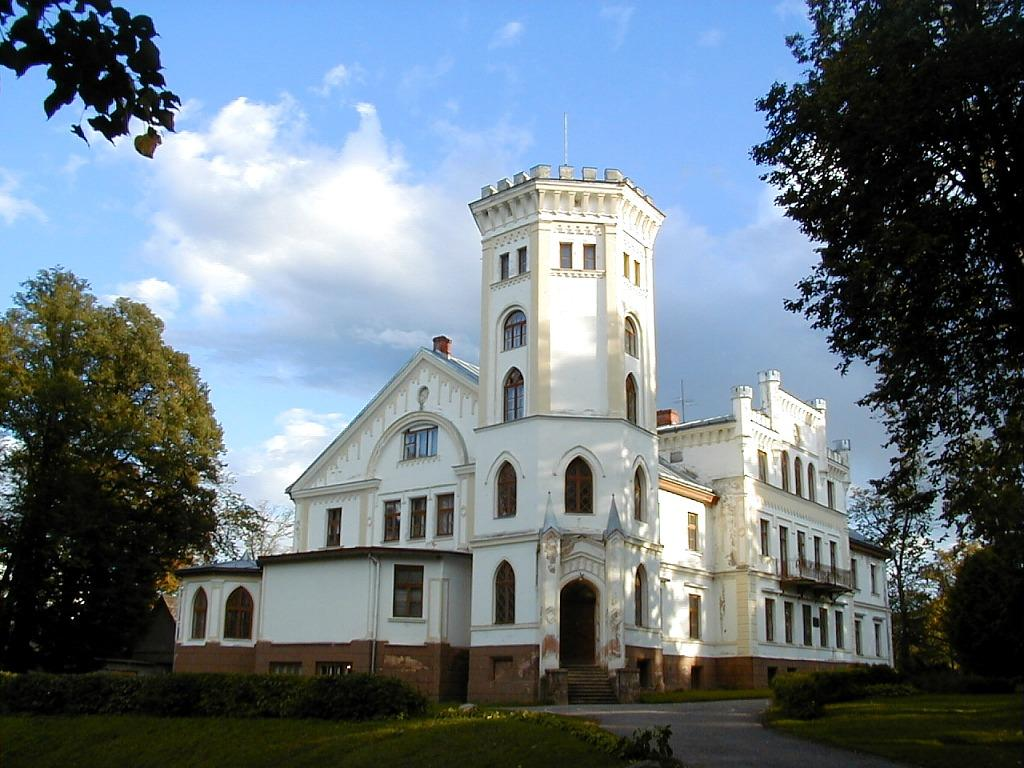

General information
- Architectural style: Tudor Neo-Gothic
- Location: Gulbene Municipality, Latvia
- Completed: 1836
- Client: von Wolff family

Lizums Manor (Latvian: Lizuma muižas pils German: Lisohn) is a two-storey manor house built around 1836 in English neo-Gothic style in Lizums Parish, Gulbene Municipality, in the Vidzeme region of Latvia. It has housed the Lizums secondary school since 1937.

== History ==
Lizums Manor was originally owned by Tiesenhausen family. Later it was acquired by Medums family. In 1629 Antonius Morrie was mentioned as the owner of the manor, and in 1657 Meijer was mentioned. From 1781, the manor became property of barons von Malama until it finally became property of von Wolf in 1836.

The Lizuma Manor House, built in the middle of the 19th century in the style of historicism with English Neo Gothic style facade finishing and octagonal tower. House indoor wood decoration was done by Alexander Knox. He made interior decoration in the Blue Hall (aka Hunters' Hall), one of the most luxurious rooms in the palace. In the 1920s Lizums Manor was nationalized in accordance with Latvian Land Reform of 1920.

== See also ==
- List of palaces and manor houses in Latvia
