= Lizums Parish =

Parish of Latvia

- parish of Latvia
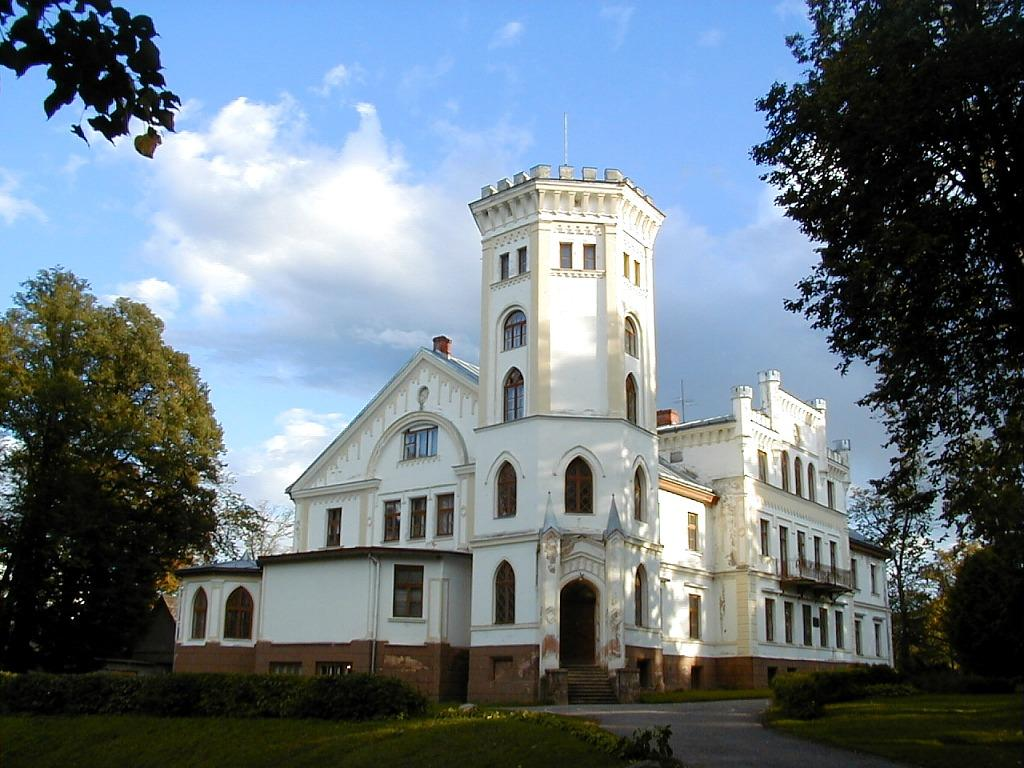
- Casa Senyorial de Lizums

- Coat of arms

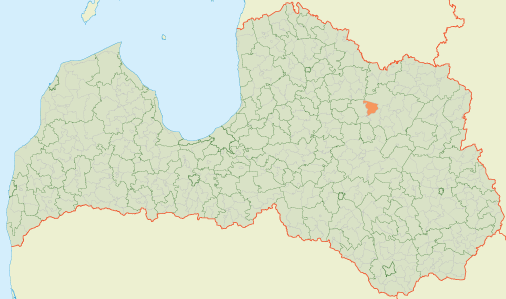
- Coordinates: 57°11′52″N 26°21′04″E
- Country: Latvia

Population (1 January 2026)
  - Total: 1,088

Lizums Parish (Latvian: Lizuma pagasts) is an administrative territorial entity of Gulbene Municipality in the Vidzeme region of Latvia. It was an administrative unit of the former Gulbene district. The administrative center is Lizums.

== Towns, villages and settlements of Lizums Parish ==
- Grūšļi
- Gužīlas
- Kolaņģi
- Lizums – parish administrative center
- Velēna
- Velēnmuiža

== History ==
In the 12th century, the lands of the present Lizums Parish were part of the Latgalian historical region of Talava. Later in XIII century these lands became property of the Archbishopric of Riga, in XVI century retreated to Poland, in XVII century Sweden and in XVIII century the Russian Empire. On the territory of the volost in the 19th century there was the Lizum estate, as well as the Tsepls, Piets and Velēna half-mansions.

In Lizums Manor, originally belonging to the Tiesenhausen family, there worked a distillery, a brewery, a liquor factory, three mills and a brick factory.

In 1935, the territory of the Lizums Parish of Cesis County was 119 km², with 1,791 people living in it.

After the Second World War, several collective farms were organized, which later joined the collective farm Spars, which became a limited liability company in 1992 and liquidated in 1993.

In 1945, the Lizums and Velēna village councils were formed into the parish. In 1949, the volost division was abolished and the Lizums village council was part of the Gauens (1949-1956) and Gulbene (after 1956) districts.

In 1951, the liquidated Velēna Village Council was merged with the Lizums Village Council. In 1960 - the territory of the farm Spars Sinol Village Council. In 1977 - part of the liquidated Sinol Village Council.

In 1990, the Lizums village council was reorganized into a volost. In 2009, at the end of the Latvian administrative-territorial reform, the Lizums Parish became part of the Gulbene region.

After 2010, there were 19 economically active enterprises, Lizums Secondary School, Lizums Volost Library, House of Culture, ambulatory, pharmacy, two post offices, forestry in the volost.

== Notable residents ==
- Apsīšu Jēkabs, real name Janis Jaunzemis (1858—1929), Latvian writer.
- Verners Vitands (1903—1982), Latvian architect.

== See also ==
- Lizums Manor
