= Dauksti Parish =

Parish of Latvia

- parish of Latvia
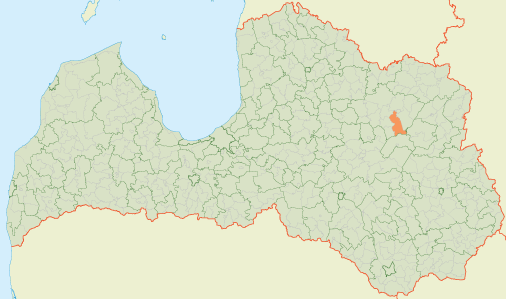
- Coordinates: 57°04′36″N 26°44′46″E
- Country: Latvia

Population (1 January 2026)
  - Total: 862

Dauksti Parish (Latvian: Daukstu pagasts) is an administrative unit of Gulbene Municipality (prior to the 2009 administrative reforms the Gulbene district), Latvia.

== Towns, villages and settlements of Dauksti parish ==
Daukstes, Elste, Stari, Sigmata, Krapa
