= Rūdolfs Blaumanis =

Latvian writer, journalist and playwright

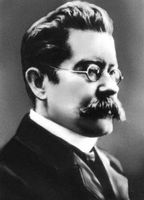
- Born: 1 January 1863 Doģiki, Governorate of Livonia, Russian Empire (Now Madona Municipality, Latvia)
- Died: 4 September 1908 (aged 45) Punkaharju, Russian empire (Now Finland)
- Occupation: Poet, Playwright, translator, journalist, teacher
- Language: Latvian, German
- Literary movement: Realism

Kārlis Rūdolfs Leonīds Blaumanis (1 January 1863 – 4 September 1908) was a Latvian writer, journalist and playwright. He is a renowned writer in Latvian history and a master of realism. His best plays are set in the late 19th century Latvian countryside and explore within the context of the farmstead the universal themes of love (Purva bridējs) and generational conflict (Indrāni), as well as the lighter side of rural social life (Skroderdienas Silmačos, Trīnes grēki). The building of a flat in Riga that he once lived in has been converted to a memorial museum named partially in his honor, the Janis Rozentāls and Rūdolfs Blaumanis museum.

== Biography ==
Rūdolfs Blaumanis was born in Ērgļi, in the Governorate of Livonia (now Latvia) on December 20, 1862. His father Matīss Blaumanis was a cook in the local manor and his mother Karlīne was a housemaid. He loved writing ever since he was a little child. Blaumanis started his education in a private school in the Ogre parish. He studied there until 1875. Then he traveled to Riga and started studies in a German merchant school until 1881. After graduation he started to work as a clerk in a trading enterprise. During this period he started to write his first works. First publication – a story Wiedergefunden was published in 1882 in [German language] newspaper Zeitung für Stadt und Land.

In 1882, he returned to his native Braki homestead and lived there until 1885. In this period he deepened his Latvian language knowledge. In 1885, he became a secretary in the Koknese manor and studied to become a steward. He spent there two years. In 1886, was published his first work in the Latvian language — the poem Nakts (Night). From 1887 until 1889 he again lived in the Braki and wrote several novels in Latvian and also German languages.

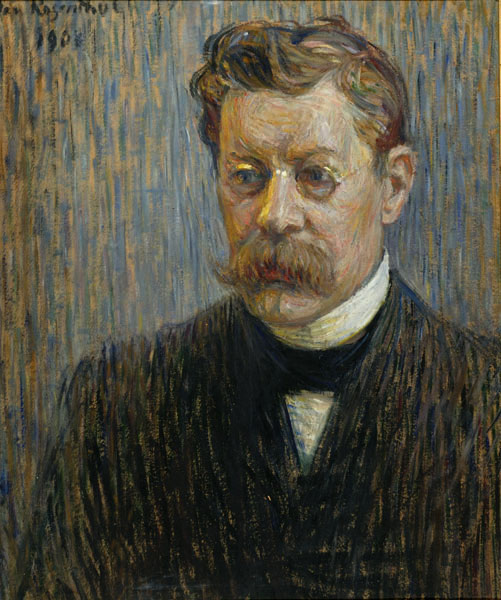
Portrait of Rūdolfs Blaumanis by Janis Rozentāls

In 1889, he moved to Riga and after two years started to work in editorial office of Zeitung für Stadt und Land where he wrote about Latvian cultural life. In 1890, his first play Zagļi (Thieves) was staged in Riga Latvian Theatre. In the following years several more of his plays was staged with good success. In 1892 collection of his novels was translated into Estonian and later several more of his works was published in Estonia. The Riga Russian Theatre presented his drama The Prodigal Son (Pazudušais dēls) in 1893. After father's death in 1894 he again lived in Braki homestead in his native Ērgļi parish for four years and tried to become a farmer. Some of his neighboring farmers and farmhands as well as his relatives and friends inspired the characters in his books, producing a trye picture of Latvian country life. A perfect example of this is his short story In the Shadow of Death portraying a group of fishermen who happen to find themselves on a piece of ice in the open sea and struggle for survival. Later he briefly worked in the New Current's main newspaper Dienas Lapa where he published satire against romanticism. In 1898 he returned to Riga and together with Aspazija and Jānis Poruks worked in one of the biggest journals Mājas Viesis. In 1900 he together with his friend Andrievs Niedra published collection of poetry.

In 1901, he moved to St.Petersburg, where he worked as journalist and editor in Latvian newspaper Pēterburgas avīzes. He led a satirical section of the newspaper. In 1904 due to the financial and health problems he returned to Latvia and until 1906 lived in Braki. In this period he wrote some of his most famous plays. He was not directly involved in the Revolution of 1905 but supported writers who were. In 1906, he again moved to Riga and started to work in the newspaper Latvija where he led satirical section. During this period, he shared a flat in Riga with his close friend painter Janis Rozentāls. In 1908, his health started to decline. Due to the financial problems he was not able to undergo treatment. However, several fellow Latvian writers started a fundraising campaign and in late summer with the help of painters J. Rozentals Finnish wife Blaumanis was able to go to Finland. However that was too late and he died on 4 September 1908 in the Punkaharju sanatorium for tubercular patients in Finland. He was buried in his native Ērgļi village.

His homestead in Braki has been turned into a museum and memorial.

== Bibliography ==
=== Translations ===
- In the Lap of Happiness, Translation by Tamāra Zālīte. Moscow: Foreign Languages Pub. House, 1969, 204 p.

=== Tales, short stories and noveles ===
- "Nezāle" (1887)
- "Pērkoņa negaiss" (1887)
- "Paradīzē" (1887)
- "Aizvien lillā" (1888)
- "Spijēnos" (1888)
- "Kā vecais Zemītis pašu nelabo redzējis" (1889)
- "Raudupiete" (1889)
- "Īstā līgaviņa" (1890)
- "Stāsts par cūku, kura runājuse" (1895)
- "Laimes klēpī" (1898)
- "Purva bridējs" (1898)
- "Salna pavasarī" (1898)
- "Andriksons" (1899)
- "Nāves ēnā" (1899)
- "Mopsis jeb Nelaime Tērbatas ielā" (1900)
- "Dziru Miķelis" (1901)
- "Stulbenis" (1904)
- "Vecais cenzors" (1907)
- "Mēmais precinieks" (1907)
- "Kā Jānis mācījies par kalēju" (1907)
- "Koka krusts" (1907)
- "Velniņi"

=== Plays ===
- "Zagļi" (1891)
- "Ļaunais gars" (1892)
- "Pazudušais dēls" (1893)
- "Maija" (1893)
- "Zelta kupris" (1895)
- "Trīnes grēki" (1897)
- "Potivāra nams" (1897)
- "No saldenās pudeles" (1901)
- "Skroderdienas Silmačos" (1902)
- "Indrāni" (1904)
- "Ugunī" (1905)
- "Sestdienas vakars" (1908)

=== Poetry ===
- "Tālavas taurētājs" (1902)
- "Kā zagšus"
- "Mana lūgšana"
- "Memento!"
- "Pērkons"
- "Renatus"
- "Šūpuļa dziesma"
- "Tautasdziesma"
- "Vēl tu nezini"
- "Zelta jaunība"
- "Ziedonis klāt"
- "Ziema"

=== Feuilleton satirical prose ===
- "Labāko famīliju dzejnieks" (1894)
- "Īsa pamācība mīlēšanā" (1907)
- "Jocīgi kapu uzraksti" (1907)

== Memory ==
- A museum dedicated to Rūdolfs Blaumanis, "Braki," was opened in 1959.
- There is the Janis Rozentāls/Rūdolfs Blaumanis Museum (memorial apartment) in Riga on Alberta Street 12.
- In Sigulda, at the crossroads of Darza and Parka Streets, a monument was built in 1988 by the sculptor I. Dobychin.
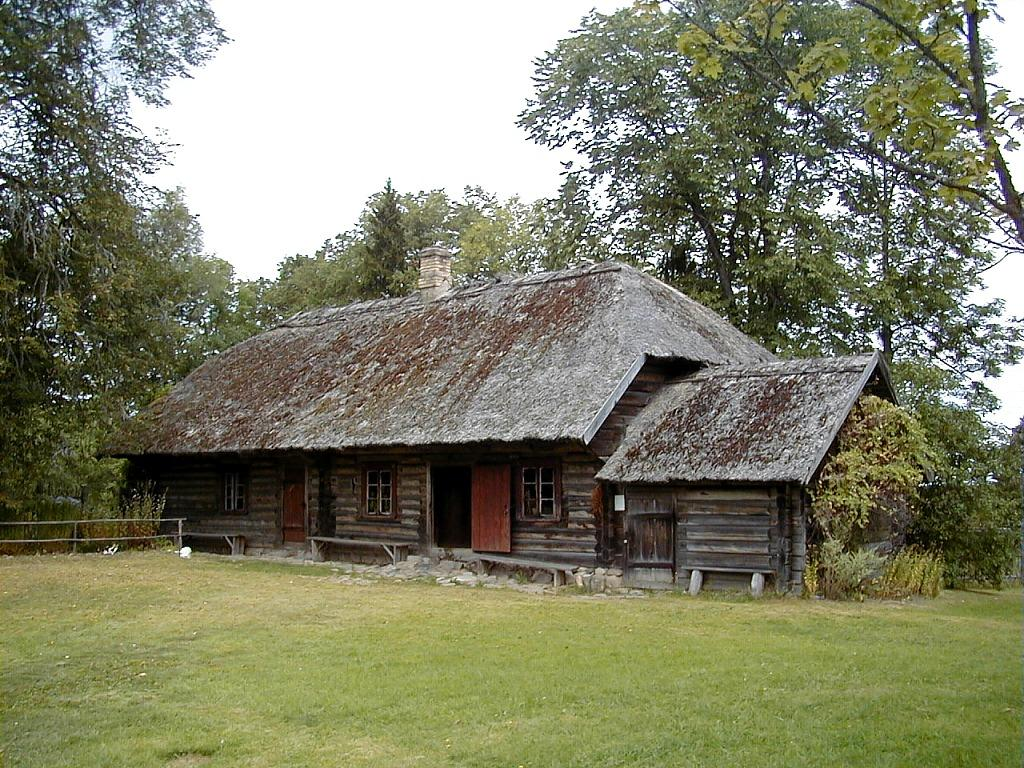
"Braki"

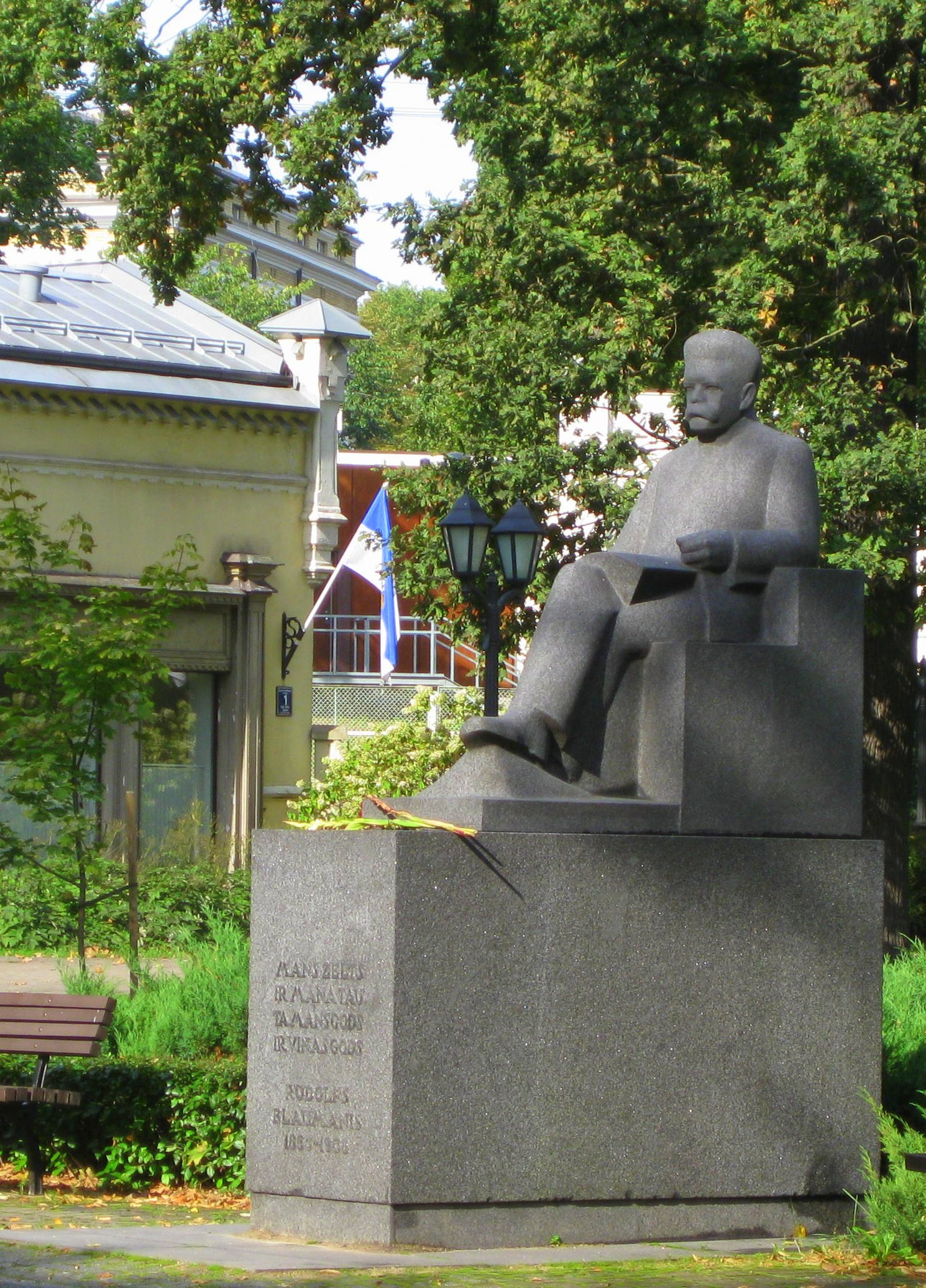
Monument in Riga Park

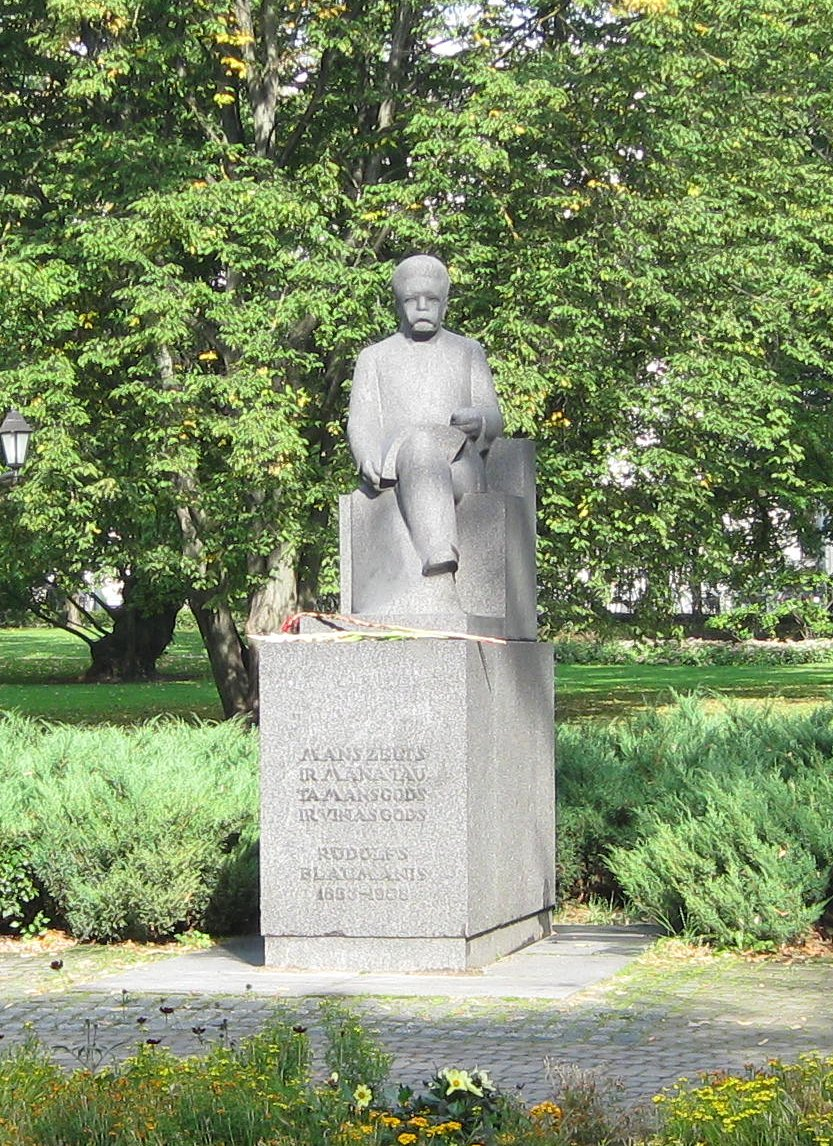

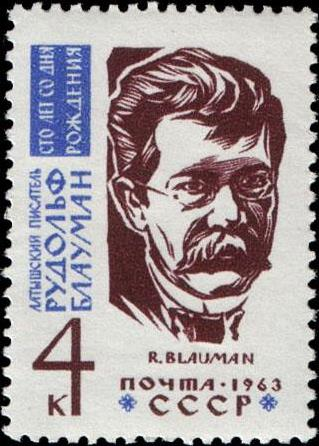
Postage stamp of the USSR, 1963
