= Stradi Parish =

Parish of Latvia

- parish of Latvia
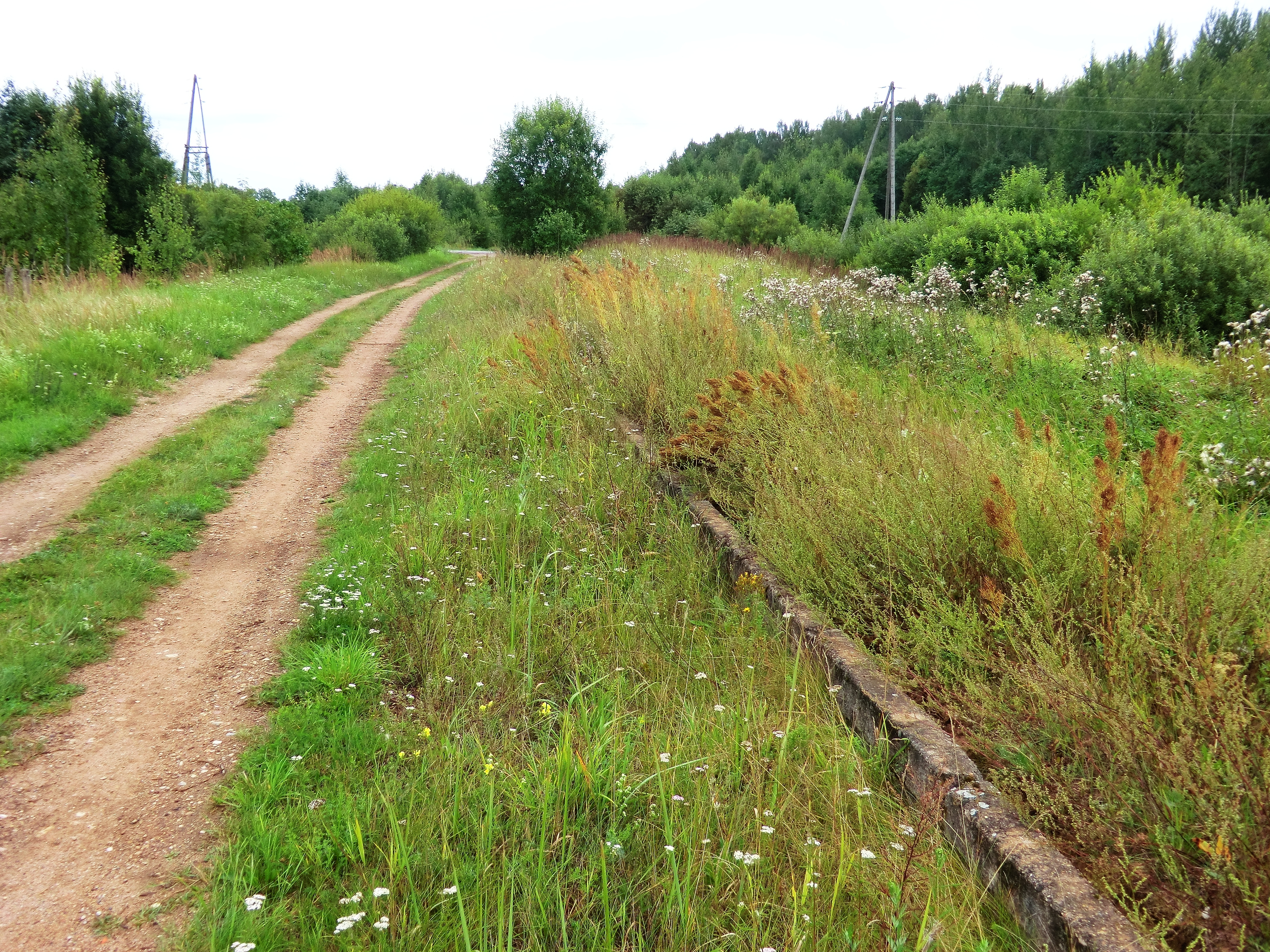

- Coat of arms

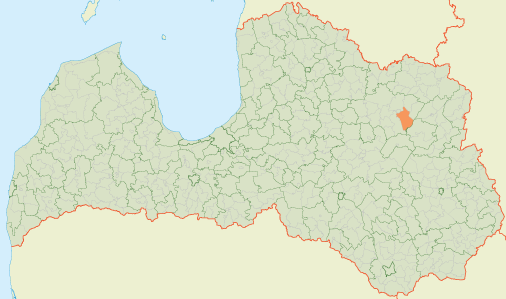
- Coordinates: 57°06′40″N 26°51′09″E
- Country: Latvia

Population (1 January 2026)
  - Total: 1,483
- Website: https://www.stradi.lv/

Stradi Parish (Latvian: Stradu pagasts) is an administrative unit of Gulbene Municipality (prior to the 2009 administrative reforms Gulbene district), Latvia.

== Towns, villages and settlements of Stradi parish ==
- Stradi, Gulbene Municipality, Latvia - parish administrative center
