= Līgo Parish =

Parish of Latvia

- parish of Latvia
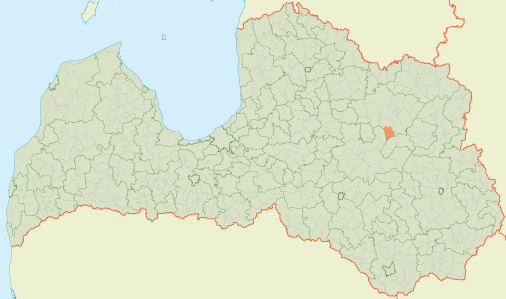
- 57°00′17″N 26°36′28″E

- Location within Latvia
- Country: Latvia

Area
  - Total: 78.80 km^{2} (30.42 sq mi)
  - Land: 76.38 km^{2} (29.49 sq mi)
  - Water: 2.42 km^{2} (0.93 sq mi)

Population (1 January 2026)
  - Total: 392
  - Density: 5.13/km^{2} (13.3/sq mi)

Līgo Parish (Latvian: Līgo pagasts) is an administrative unit of Gulbene Municipality (prior to the 2009 administrative reforms Gulbene district), Latvia.
