= Ranka Parish =

Parish of Latvia

- parish of Latvia
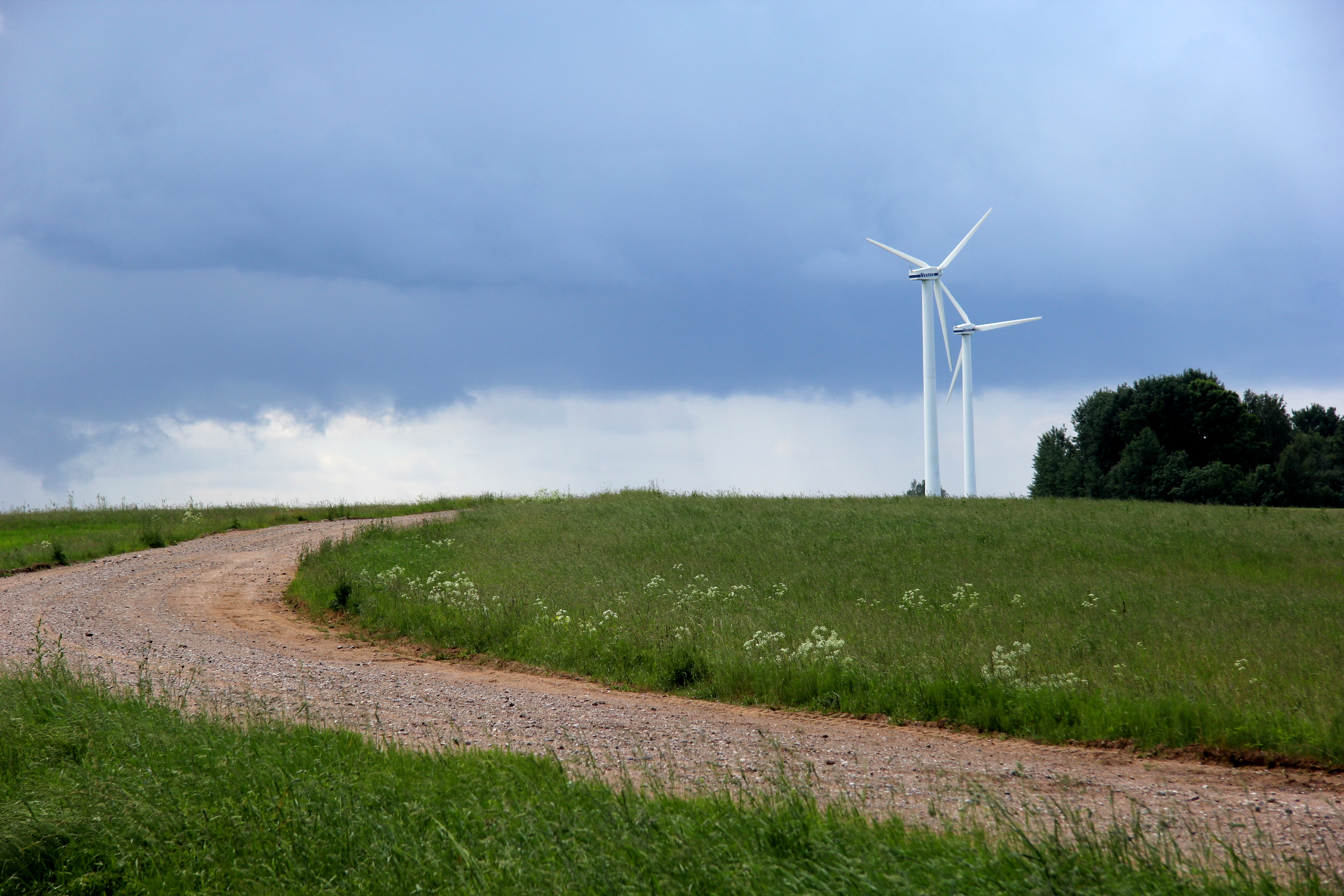

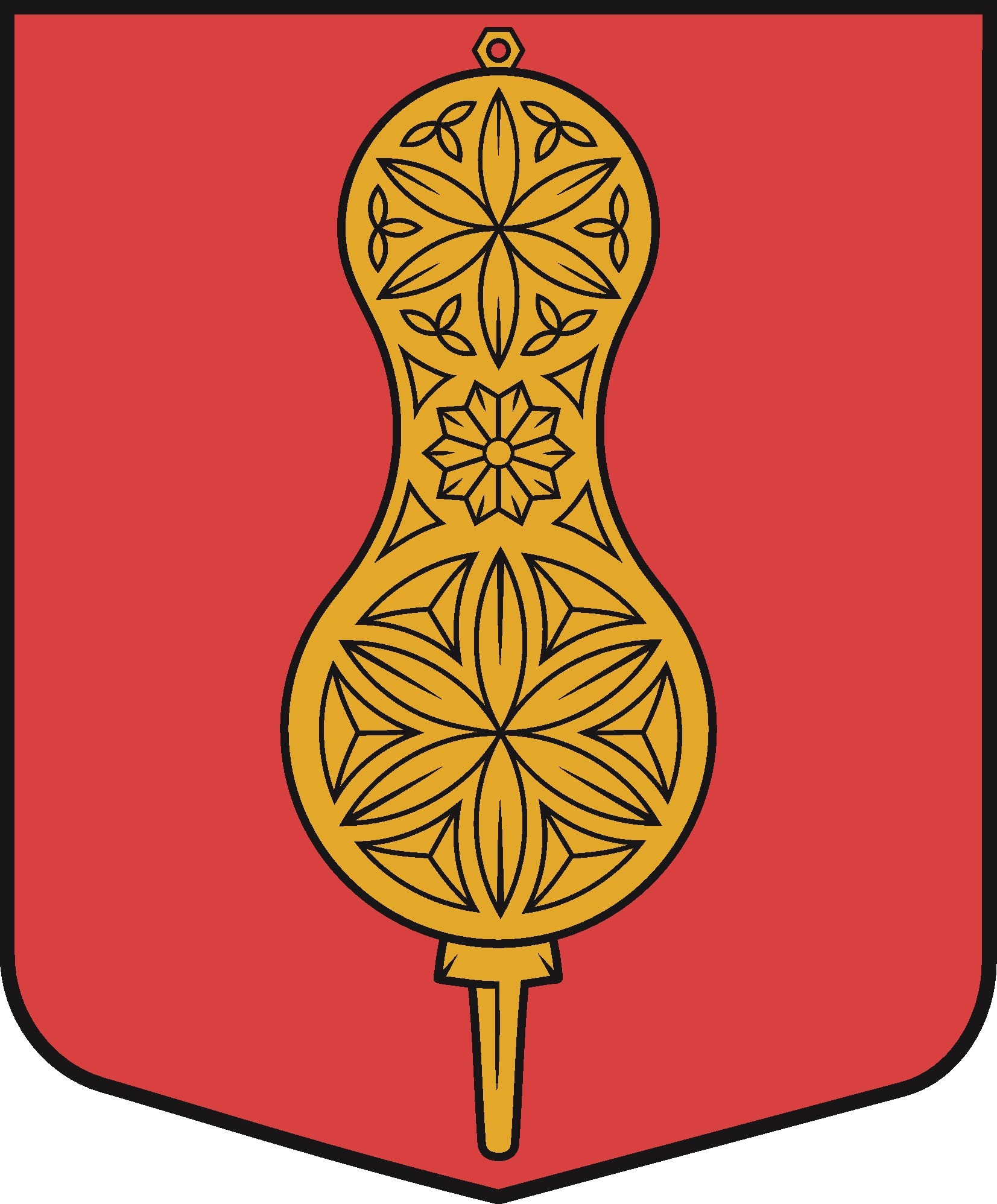
- Coat of arms

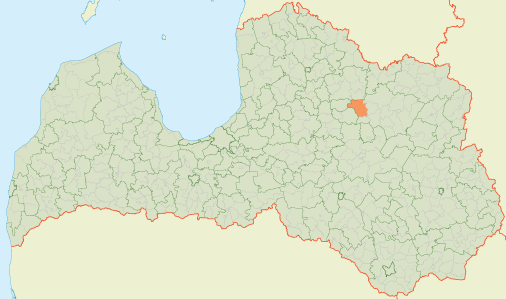
- Coordinates: 57°12′42″N 26°11′11″E
- Country: Latvia

Population (1 January 2026)
  - Total: 1,100
- Time zone: UTC+02:00

Ranka parish (Latvian: Rankas pagasts) is an administrative unit of Gulbene Municipality (prior to the 2009 administrative reforms Gulbene district). It is located in a hilly region with land use consisting mainly of agriculture and forests.

== Towns, villages and settlements ==
Hamlets in the Ranka parish are:

- Sprogi
- Birzuli
- Kakupi
- Lacumeri
- Vecamuiza
- Pavarini
- Dukuli
- Augstkalni
- Pluksi
- Papani
- Kartonfabrika
- Ranka
- Salina
- Branti
- Lacites
- Sejatas
- Lukes
- Reveli
- Kezi
- Mezsiliesi

== Lakes ==
In Ranka parish are several lakes, including:

- Kalmodu ezers
- Cepļu ezers
- Teļezers

== Transport ==
The regional roads P33 and P27 run through Ranka.

Ranka has 2 railway stations: Uriekste and Ranka.
