= Stāmeriena Parish =

Parish of Latvia

- parish of Latvia
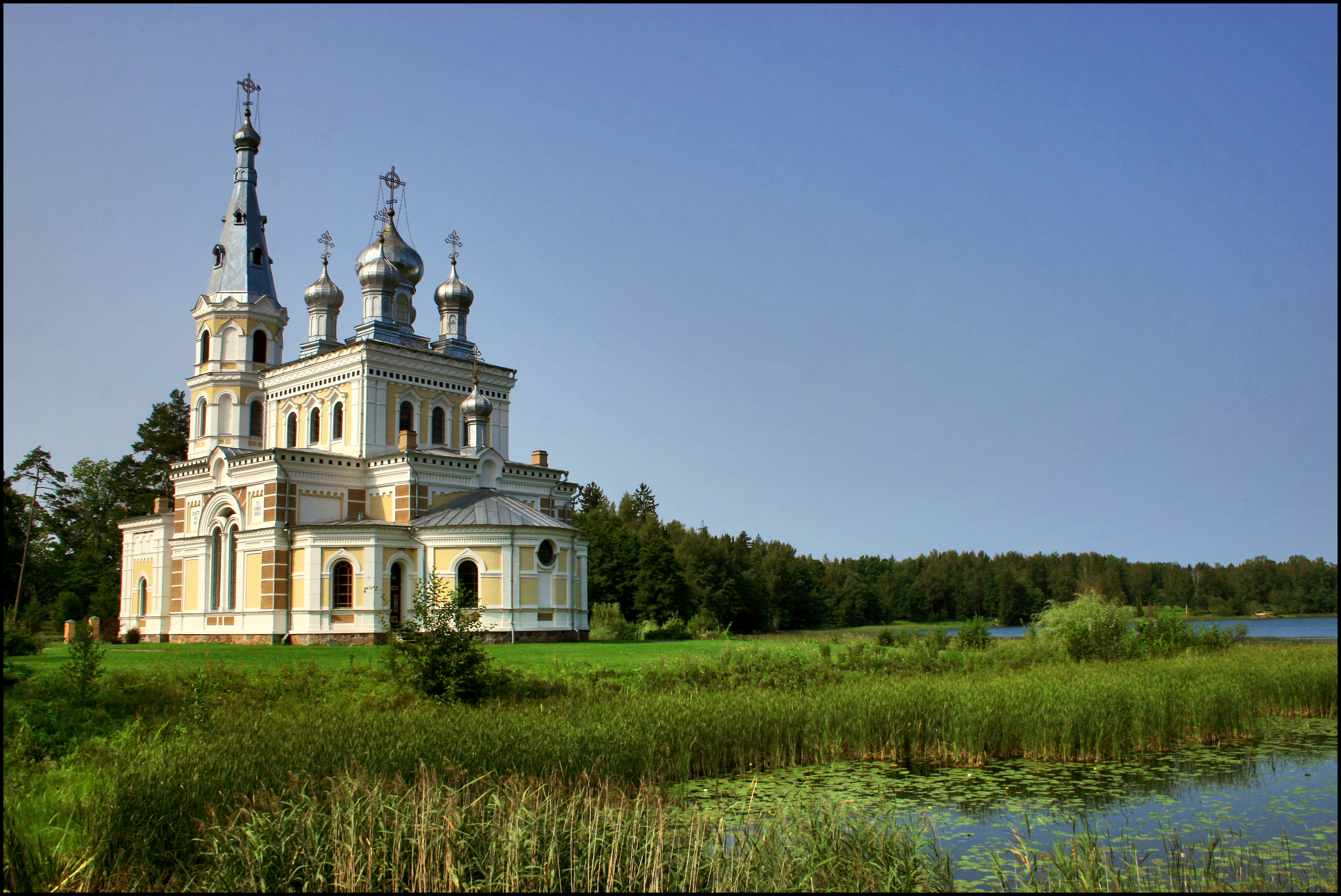
- Església ortodoxa Alexander Nevsky de Stāmeriena

- Coat of arms

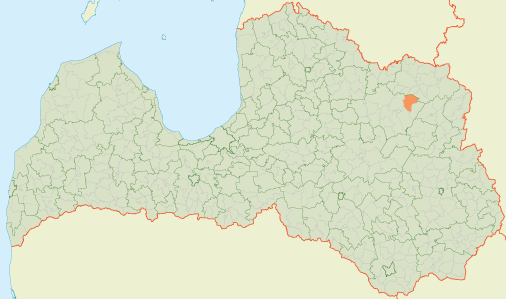
- Coordinates: 57°14′46″N 26°56′17″E
- Country: Latvia

Population (1 January 2026)
  - Total: 828

Stāmeriena Parish (Latvian: Stāmerienas pagasts) is an administrative unit of Gulbene Municipality, Latvia. The administrative center is Vecstāmeriena.

== Towns, villages and settlements of Stāmeriena parish ==
- Āboliņi
- Kalniena
- Lāčplēši
- Medņi
- Namsadi
- Putrāni
- Skolas
- Stāmeriena
- Stancmuiža
- Stūrastas
- Vecstāmeriena

== See also ==
- Stāmeriena Palace
