= Druviena Parish =

Parish of Latvia

- parish of Latvia
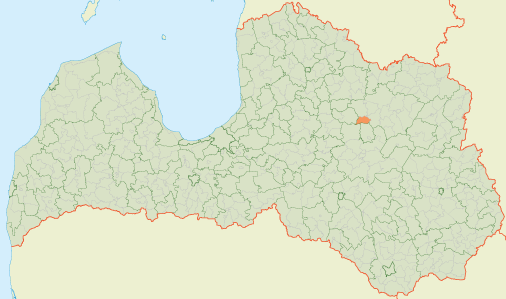
- Coordinates: 57°06′53″N 26°17′46″E
- Country: Latvia

Population (1 January 2026)
  - Total: 395

Druviena Parish (Latvian: Druvienas pagasts) is an administrative unit of Gulbene Municipality (prior to the 2009 administrative reforms the Gulbene district), Latvia.

== See also ==
- Druviena Manor
