= Tirza Parish =

Parish of Latvia

- parish of Latvia
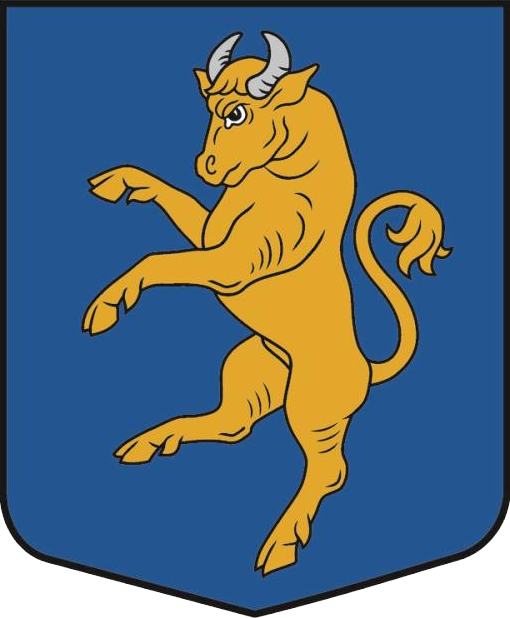
- Coat of arms

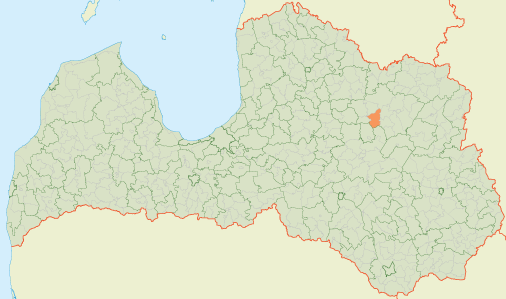
- Coordinates: 57°08′28″N 26°25′32″E
- Country: Latvia

Population (1 January 2026)
  - Total: 709

Tirza Parish (Latvian: Tirzas pagasts) is an administrative unit of Gulbene Municipality in the Vidzeme region of Latvia.
