= Litene Parish =

Parish of Latvia

- parish of Latvia
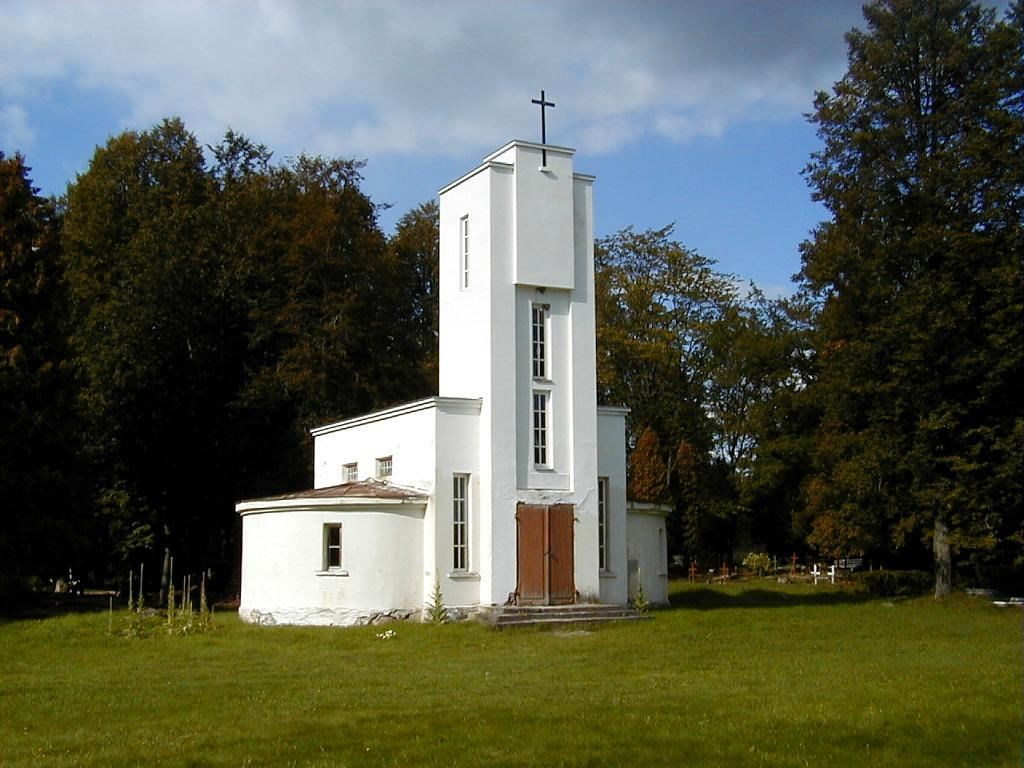
- Capella del cementiri

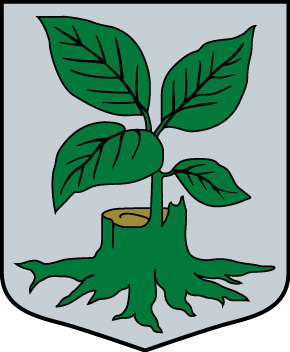
- Coat of arms

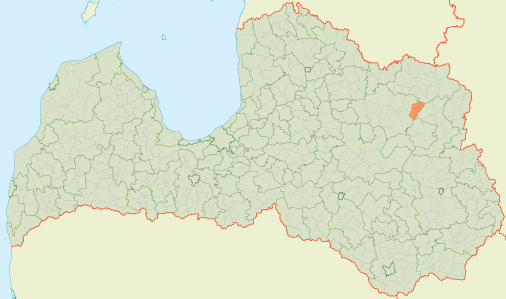
- Coordinates: 57°11′00″N 27°02′00″E
- Country: Latvia

Population (1 January 2026)
  - Total: 766

Litene Parish (Latvian: Litenes pagasts) is situated in Gulbene Municipality in the Vidzeme region of Latvia. It was an administrative unit of Gulbene district. The administrative center is Litene.

Territory - 127 km²

Population (01.01.2005) - 1,250.

Inhabited places - Atpūtas, Aurova, Fabrikas, Kordona, Lešķi, Litene, Silava, Silenieki, Skujenieki, Zāģernieki.

Rivers - Apkārtupe, Dzirla, Gludupīte, Kaugurupīte, Lekšupe, Mugurupe, Pededze, Sita.

Lakes - Kalnis, Kauguru ezers.
