= Beļava Parish =

Parish of Latvia

- parish of Latvia
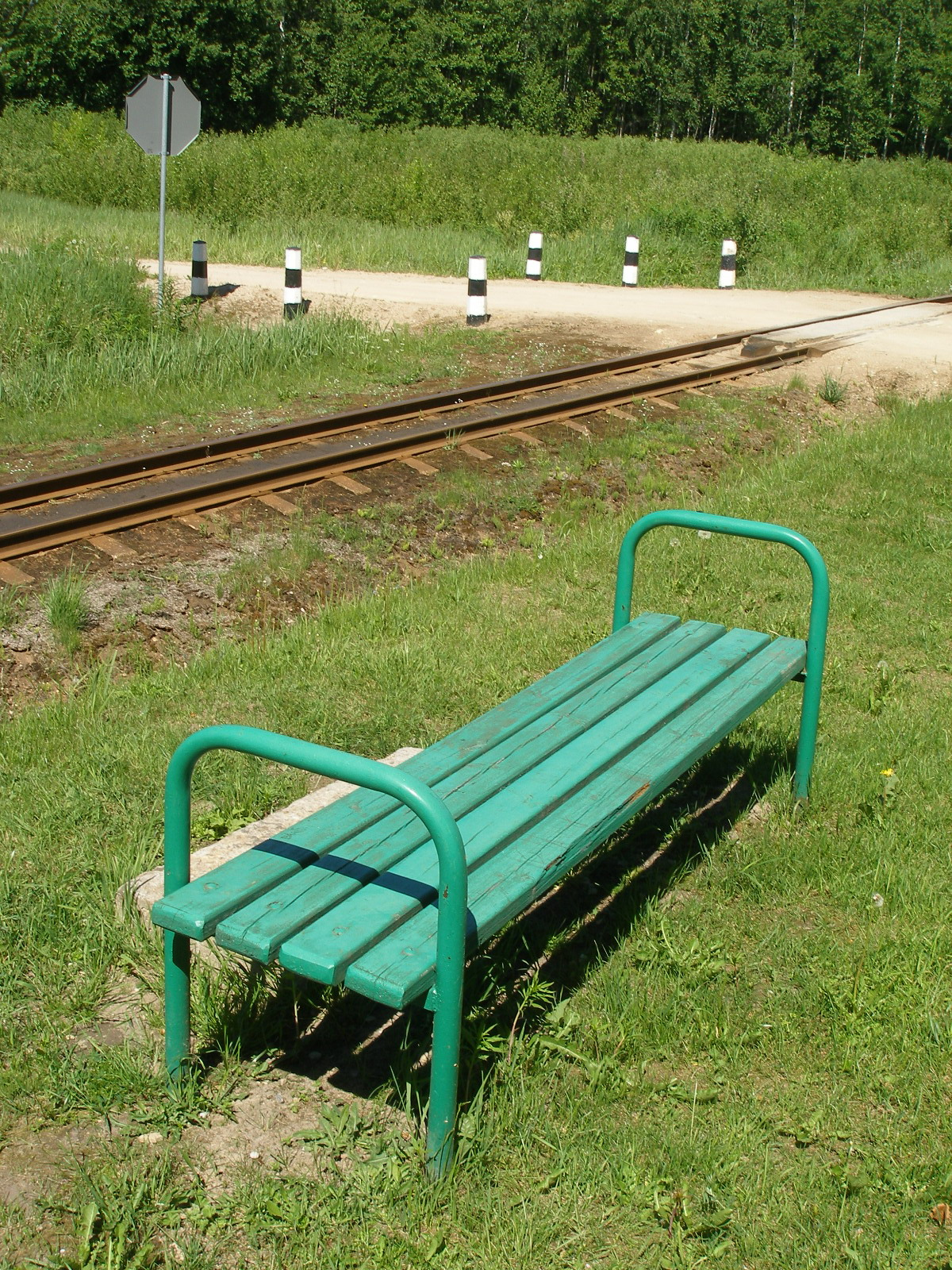
- Parada de ferrocarril a la parròquia de Beļava

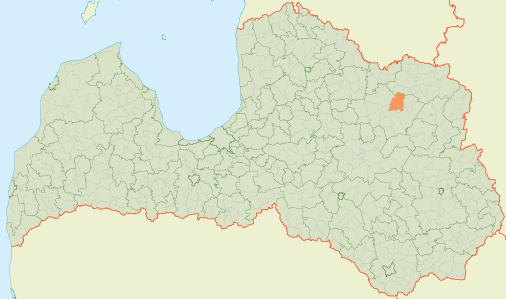
- Coordinates: 57°15′16″N 26°46′13″E
- Country: Latvia

Population (1 January 2026)
  - Total: 1,184
- Time zone: Eastern European Time

Beļava parish (Latvian: Beļavas pagasts) is an administrative unit of the Gulbene Municipality, Latvia. The administrative center is Beļava.

== Towns, villages and settlements of Beļava parish ==
- Auguliena
- Auziņas
- Beļava
- Butāni
- Dumpji
- Gulbītis
- Letes
- Naglene
- Pilsskola
- Sīļi
- Spārīte
- Spriņģi
- Vanagi
