= Galgauska Parish =

Parish of Latvia

- parish of Latvia
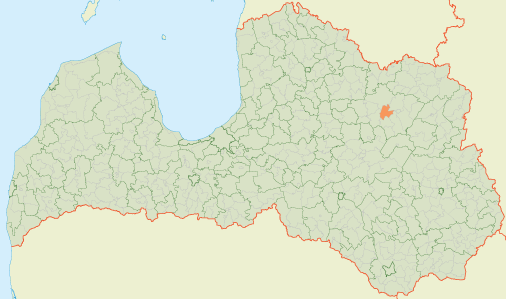
- Coordinates: 57°09′56″N 26°33′02″E
- Country: Latvia

Population (1 January 2026)
  - Total: 479

Galgauska Parish (Latvian: Galgauskas pagasts) is an administrative unit of Gulbene district, Latvia.
