= Jānis Poruks =

Latvian poet and writer (1871–1911)

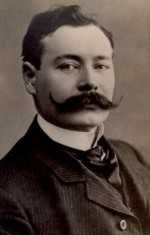
- Born: 13 October 1871; Druviena parish, Kreis Walk, Governorate of Livonia, Russian Empire, (now Latvia)
- Died: 25 July 1911 (aged 39); Tartu, Russian Empire (now Estonia)
- Occupations: Poet, writer
- Writing career
- Genre: Poetry
- Notable works: Pērļu zvejnieks ("The Pearl Fisher", 1895)
- Literary movement: Romanticism

Jānis Poruks (13 October 1871 – 25 July 1911), was a Latvian poet and writer could be considered as a founder of the romantic branch of Latvian literature.

== Biography ==
Jānis Poruks was born in Druviena parish, in the Kreis Walk of the Governorate of Livonia in a peasant family. He started his education in local Druviena parish school. Later he studied also in Liezēre parish school and Cēsis city school. In 1893 Poruks went to Germany and started studies in Dresden Conservatory. While in Dresden he published his first book, a collection of essays in German language Religion der Zukunft. Poruks returned to Latvia in 1894 when he ran out of money. In Latvia, he started chemistry studies in Riga Polytechnical Institute but later he shifted to commerce. He also started to work in newspaper Mājas Viesis. During this period he wrote most of his most famous works and often signed them with pseudonyms Nemo'or Parsifal.

After 1905 Poruks mental health started to decline, and he was treated in mental hospitals in Rīga, Strenči and Tartu. From 1909 until 1910 Poruks lived in writer's home Burtnieku nams in Riga. Jānis Poruks died on 25 July 1911 in mental hospital in Tartu. He was buried in Cēsis cemetery, but in 1924 his remains were reburied in Forest Cemetery in Riga.

== Literature ==
The first publication of Poruks was a short story Purvaiņos which was published in a newspaper Dienas Lapa in 1888. He wrote 13 stories, one novel, one collection of poetry and one play. In his prose works he used elements of romanticism, realism and symbolism, sometimes even all in one work. His poetry is very intimate and romantic. Latvian composer Emīls Dārziņš composed music to several of his poems.
