= Jaungulbene Parish =

Parish of Latvia

- parish of Latvia
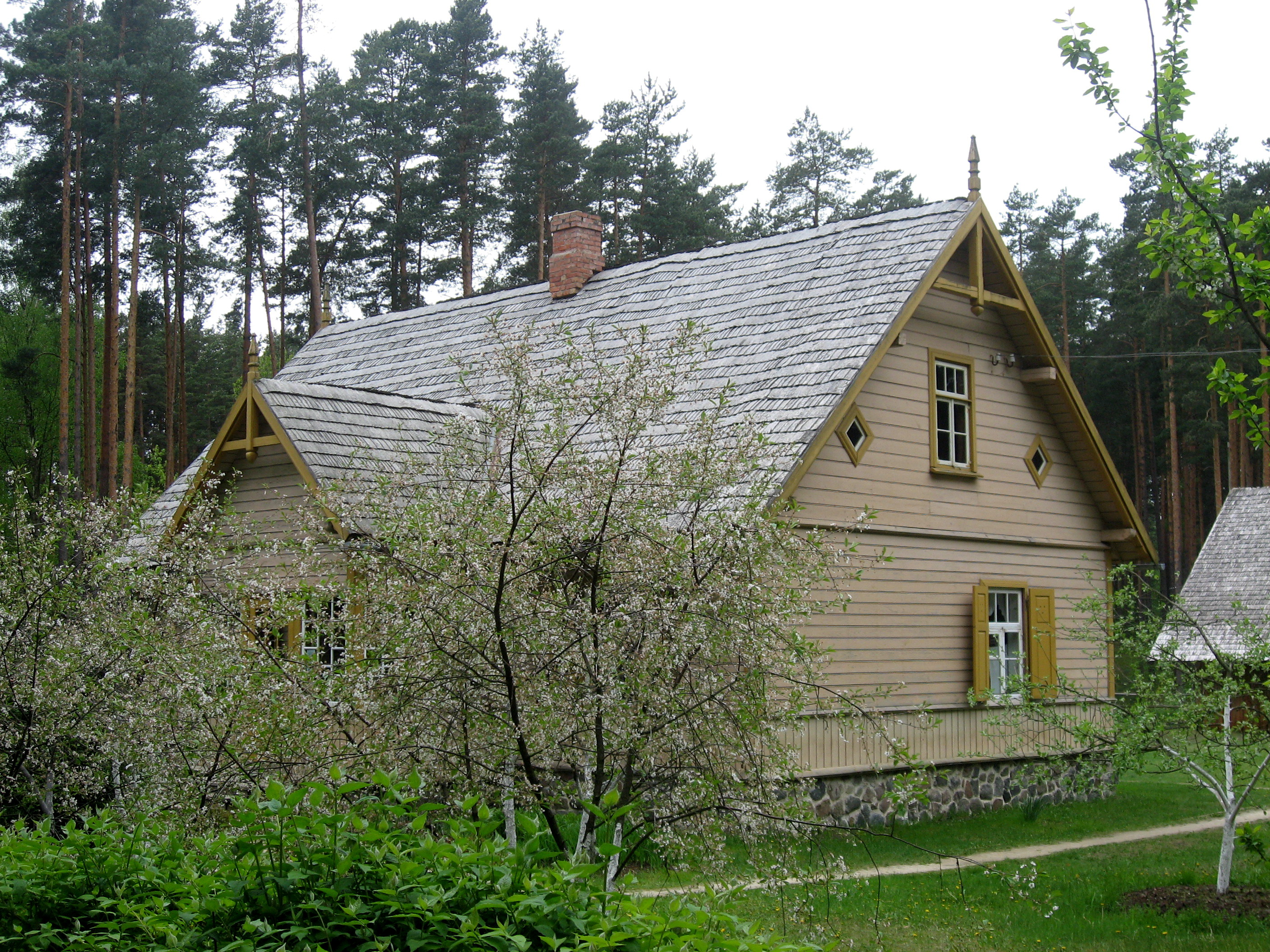
- Latvian Ethnographic Open-Air Museum: Residential house, Vidzeme area, Jaungulbene, "Kazaki", built in 1925

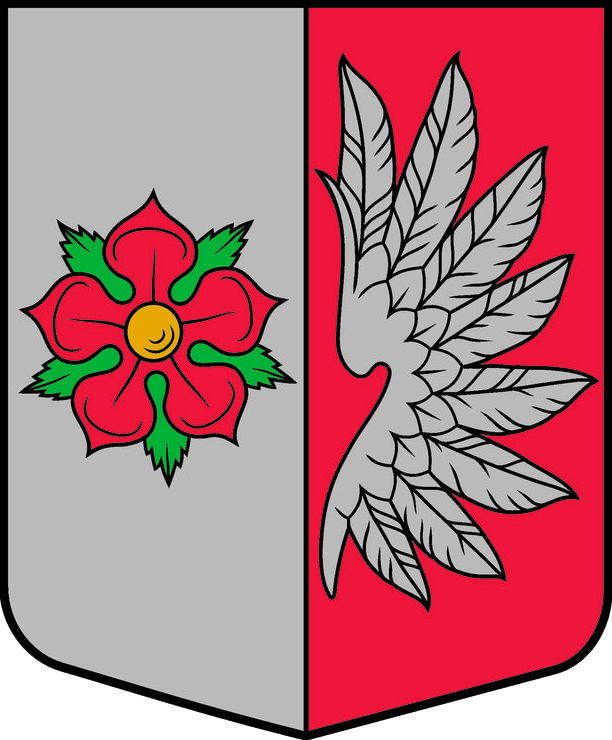
- Coat of arms

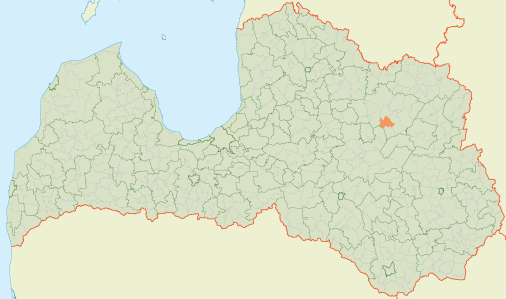
- Coordinates: 57°04′38″N 26°37′44″E
- Country: Latvia

Population (1 January 2026)
  - Total: 980

Jaungulbene Parish (Latvian: Jaungulbenes pagasts) is an administrative unit of Gulbene Municipality in the Vidzeme region of Latvia. The administrative center is Gulbītis.

== Towns, villages and settlements of Jaungulbene parish ==
- Abrava
- Aduliena
- Agrumi
- Gulbītis
- Jaungulbene
- Kaipi
- Pauri
- Siladzirnavas
