= Gulbene Municipality =

Municipality of Latvia

Coordinates: 57°10′55″N 26°45′50″E

Gulbene Municipality Gulbenes novads
- Municipality
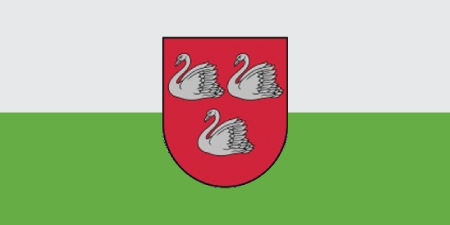
- Flag Coat of arms

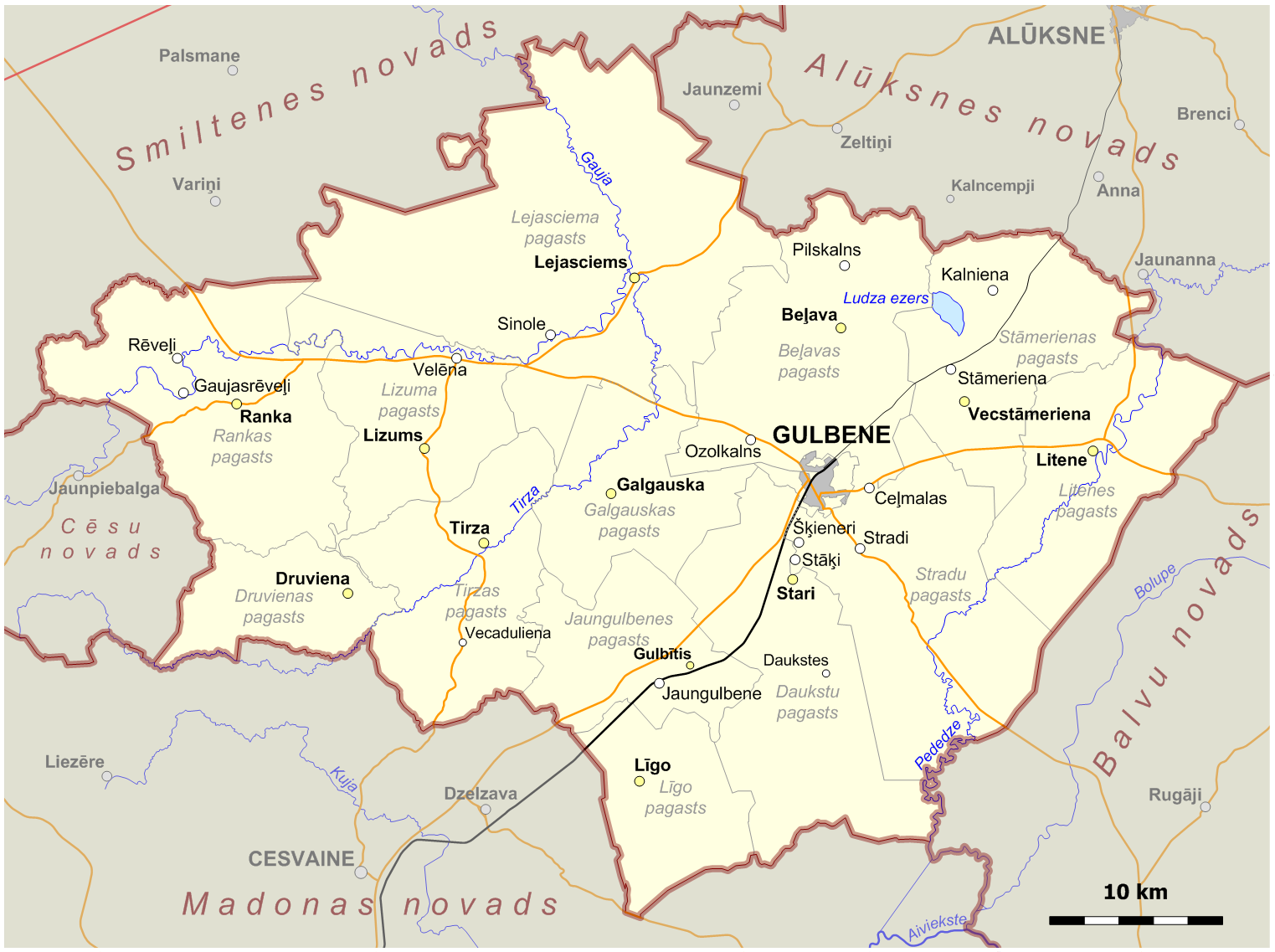
- Country: Latvia
- Formed: 2009
- Centre: Gulbene

Government
  - Council Chair: Normunds Mazūrs (LA)

Area
  - Total: 1,872.22 km^{2} (722.87 sq mi)
  - Land: 1,811.62 km^{2} (699.47 sq mi)
  - Water: 60.6 km^{2} (23.4 sq mi)

Population (2026)
  - Total: 18,215
  - Density: 10.055/km^{2} (26.041/sq mi)
- Website: www.gulbene.lv

Gulbene Municipality (Latvian: Gulbenes novads) is a municipality in Vidzeme, Latvia. The municipality was formed in 2009 by merging Beļava parish, Dauksti parish, Druviena parish, Galgauska parish, Jaungulbene parish, Lejasciems parish, Litene parish, Lizums parish, Līgo parish, Ranka parish, Stāmeriena parish, Stradi parish, Tirza parish and Gulbene town the administrative centre being Gulbene. The population in 2020 was 19,771.

== Images ==
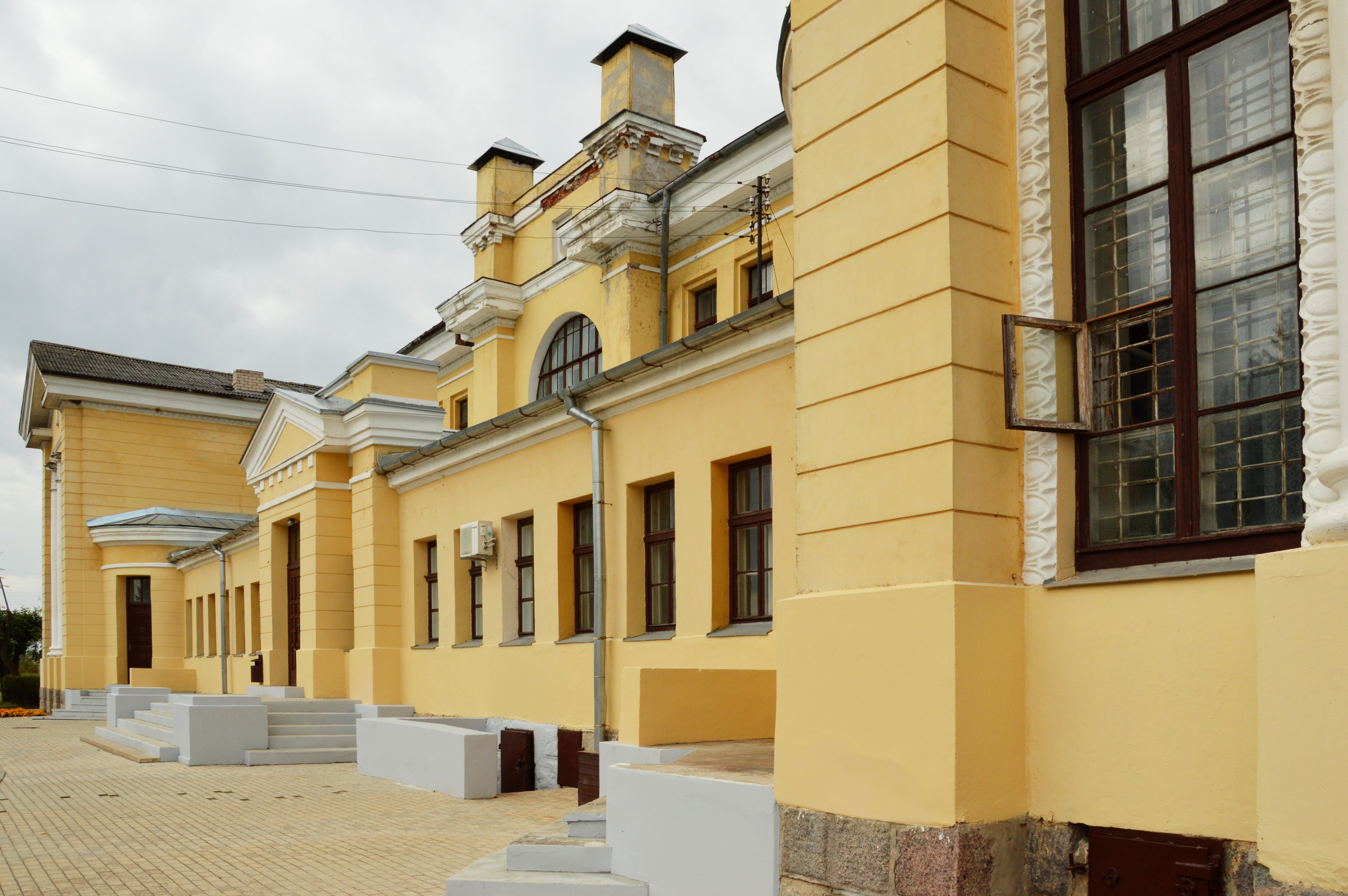
Gulbene

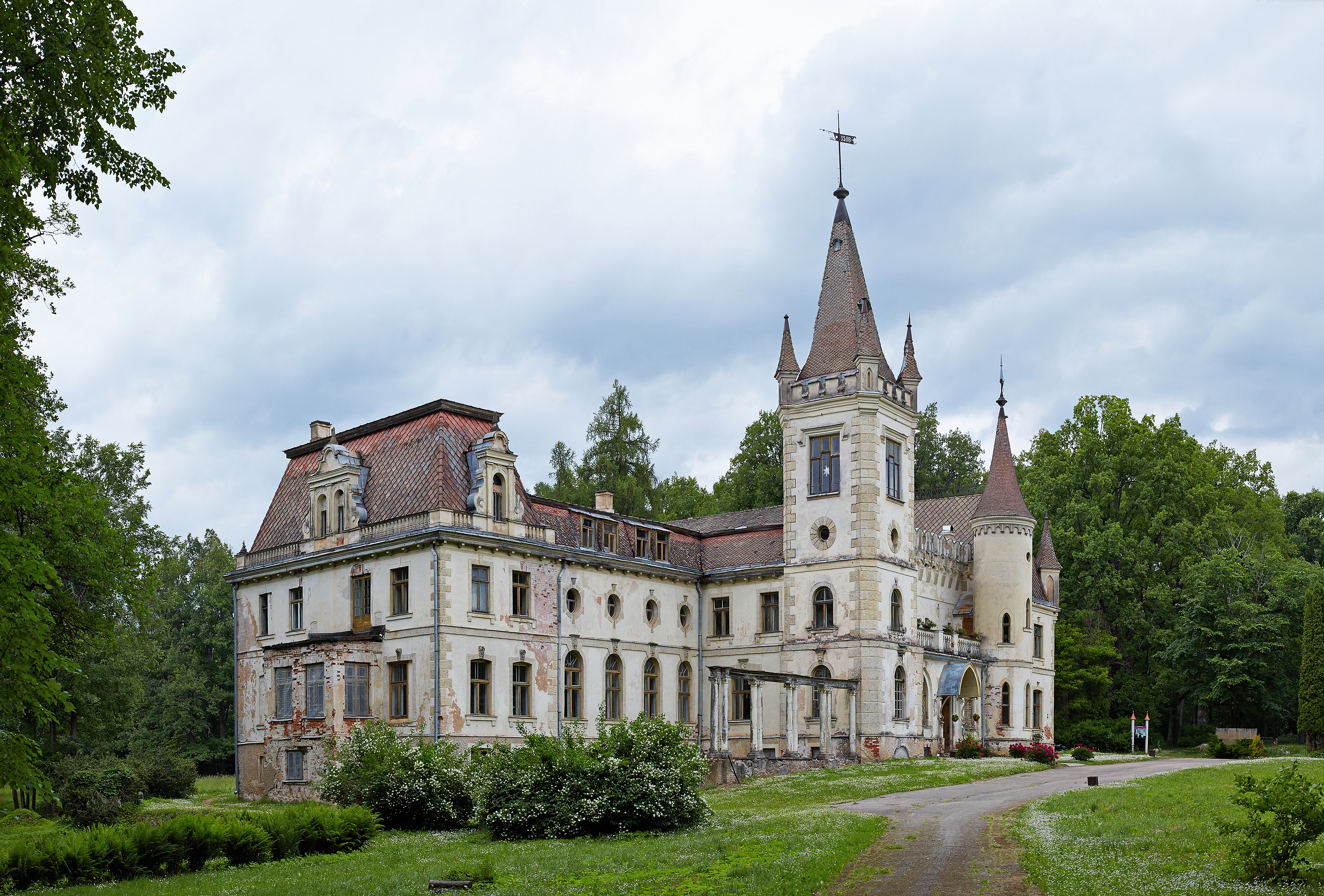
Stāmeriena

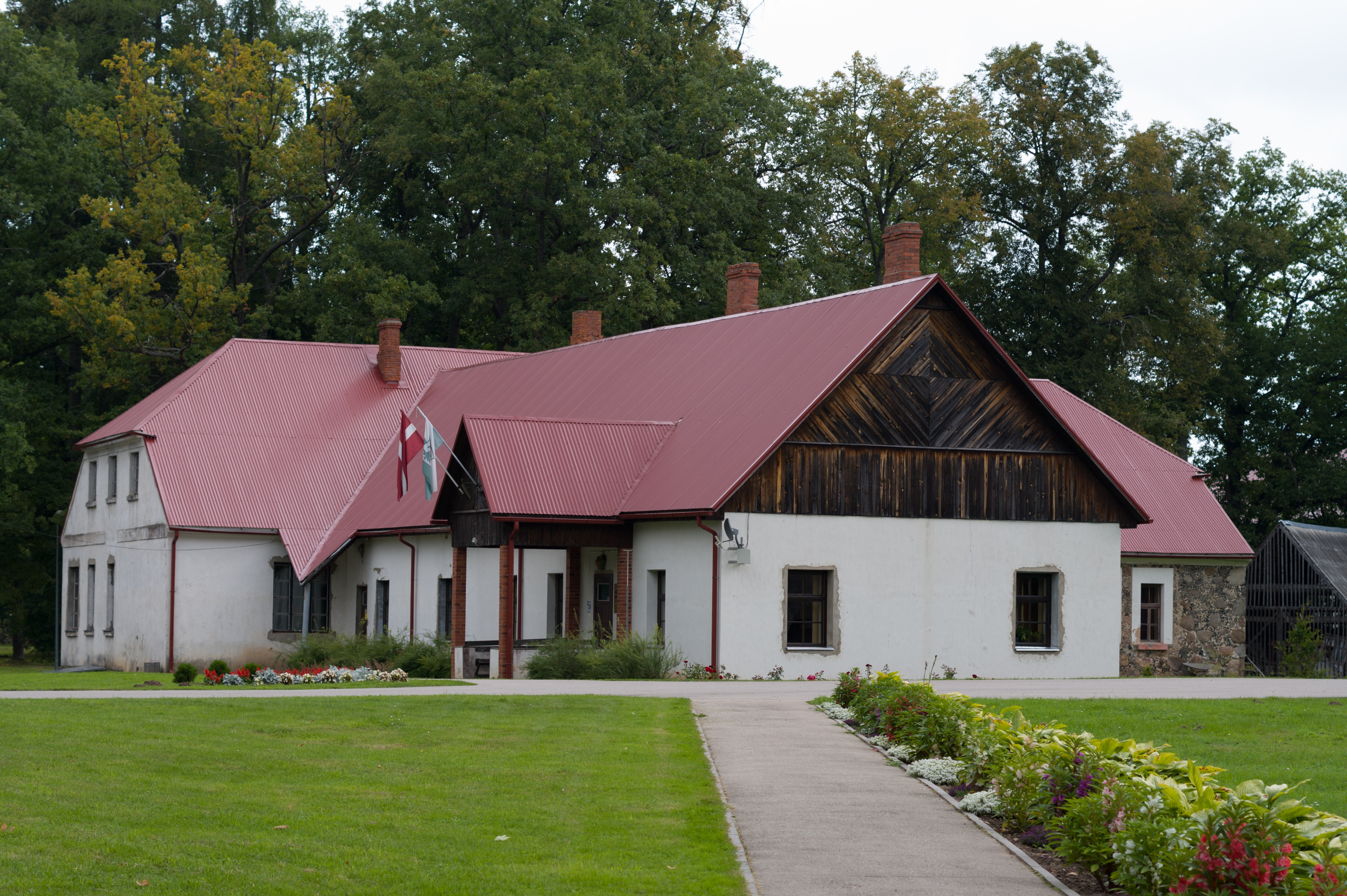
Litene

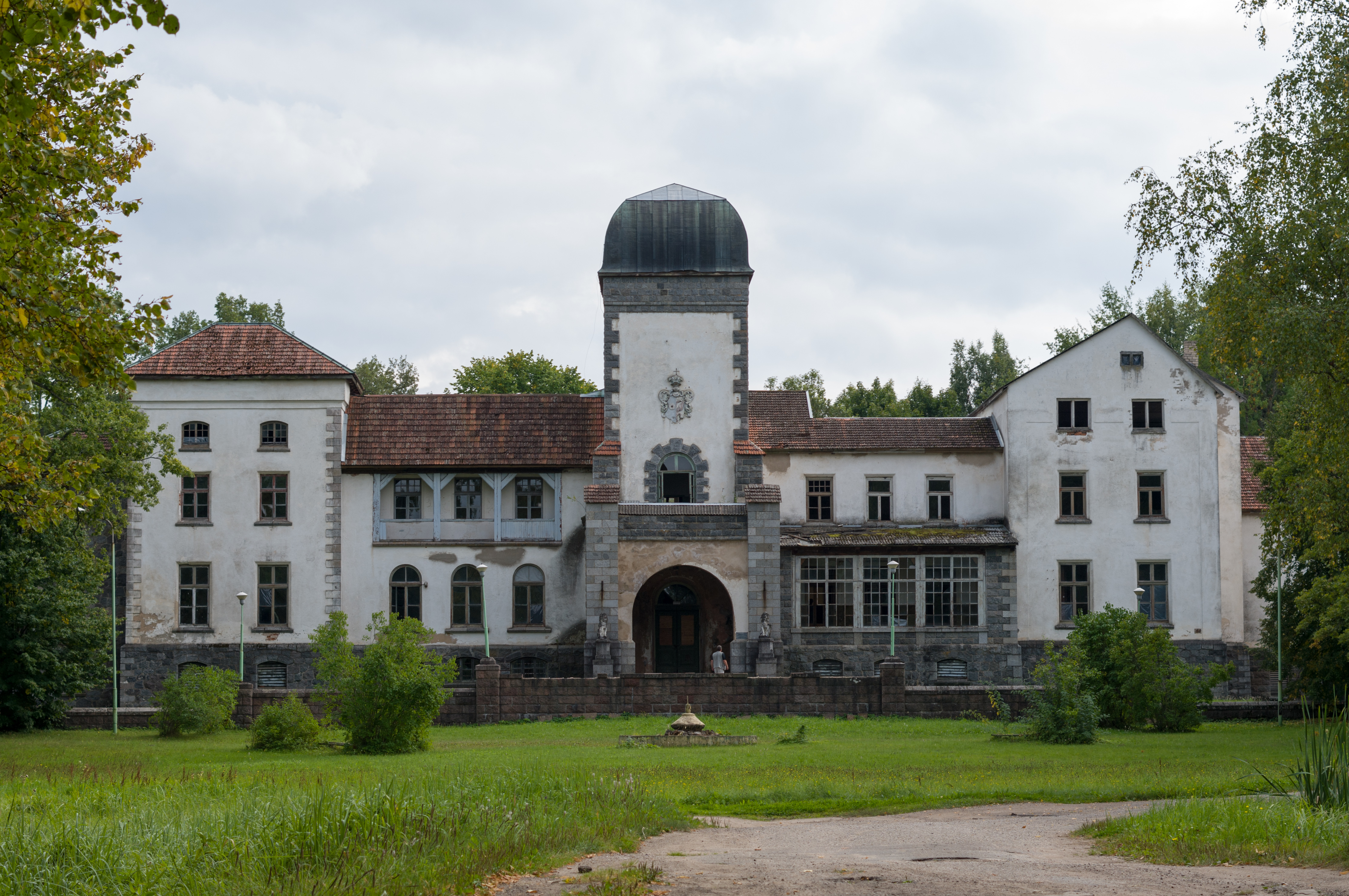
Jaungulbene

== Notable people ==
- Jānis Poruks (1871 in Druviena Parish – 1911), poet and writer, seen as the founder of the romantic branch in Latvian literature
- Andrievs Niedra (1871 in Tirza Parish – 1942), writer, Lutheran pastor and puppet Prime Minister in 1919
- Augusts Malvess (1878 in Vecgulbenes parish – 1951), a Latvian architect.
- Edward Leedskalnin (1887 in Stāmeriena Parish – 1951), US immigrant, self-taught engineer, built the Coral Castle in Florida
- Voldemārs Irbe (1893 in Beļava Parish – 1944), a Latvian pastel painter, known as "Barefoot Irbīte"
- Roberts Eidemanis (1895 in Lejasciems – 1937), soldier and later a writer and poet.
- Zenta Mauriņa (1897 in Lejasciems – 1978), writer, essayist and researcher in philology; nominated for the 1973 Nobel Prize in Literature
- Anna Sakse (1905 in Lejasciems – 1981), a Latvian political writer, literary figure and translator
- Uldis Pūcītis (1937 in Ranka Parish – 2000), a Latvian TV, theatre and film actor, scriptwriter and film director.

== See also ==
- Administrative divisions of Latvia (2009)
