= List of Latvian sculptors =

This is a list of sculptors who were born or whose creative production is associated with Latvia:

== A ==
- Naoum Aronson (1872–1943) was a born in Krāslava, known for his busts of Louis Pasteur, Leo Tolstoy, Grigori Rasputin, Vladimir Lenin and others.

== B ==
- Kārlis Baumanis (sculptor) (in Latvian) (1916–2011), one of creators of the Rainis Grave Memorial.
- Léopold Bernhard Bernstamm (1859–1939), gained fame in the early 1880s by creating over three hundred sculptural portraits of Russian and French personalities.
- Aigars Bikše (in Latvian) (born 1969) known for his large scale sculptures as well as medalist works.
- Laimonis Blumbergs (in Latvian) (1919–2014) renown for his stone sculptures in granite, marble, labradorite, limestone and boulder.
- Aleksandra Briede (1901–1992) worked on small-scale figurative compositions and portraits. Together with her husband sculptor Jānis Briedis worked on monuments and busts of Soviet leaders. In the 1960s her busts of Lenin were visible in many locations in Latvian SSR.
- Jānis Briedis (sculptor) (in Latvian) (1902–1953) worked on monuments and memorials. Together with his wife sculptor Aleksandra Briede won state competition to create enormous Stalin monument in Riga. Project was never implemented.
- Leo Janis-Briedītis (in Swedish) (1922–2007) known for using polished stainless steel as sculptural material.
- Leo Bukovsky (in Latvian) (1910–1984) known for his World War II memorials. One of creators of the Salaspils Memorial.

== C ==
- Vija Celmins (born 1938), known for her visual art and pop art sculptures.
- Valdis Celms (born 1943), known for his kinetic art.

== D ==
- Lea Davidova-Medene (in Latvian) (1921–1986) known for her sculptural portraits.
- Igors Dobičins (in German) (born 1958), known for works in public spaces.
- Arta Dumpe (in Latvian) (born 1933), known for Brothers' Cemetery memorial in Lestene.
- Burkards Dzenis (1879–1966), was sculptor and designer, director of the Latvian National Museum of Art in 1920–1944.

== F ==
- Ojārs Arvīds Feldbergs (born 1947), provisional winner of a contest for a monument to commemorate the centenary of Latvian independence.
- Rūdolfs Feldbergs, created Monument to the Army Regiment of the 1st Armored Division in Art Deco style in Riga in cooperation with architect Verners Vitands.
- Indulis Folkmanis (in Latvian) (born 1939), known for public monuments in Daugavpils.

== G ==
- Willy Gordon (1918–2003), prominent Swedish-Jewish sculptor born in Latvia, created a monument in honour of Swedish diplomat Raoul Wallenberg.
- Kristaps Gulbis (born 1967), known for numerous contemporary art projects in more than 25 countries.

== J ==
- Voldemārs Jākobsons (in Latvian) (1899–1974) known for his park sculptures.
- Karlis Johansons (1890–1929), developed "self-stabilizing constructions" considered to be the prototypes of the tensegrity structures.

== L ==
- Marta Lange (in Latvian) (1903–1985) known for her sculptural portraits for installation in public places.
- Edward Leedskalnin (1887–1951), built the Coral Castle in Florida.

== M ==
- Emīls Melderis (in Latvian) (1889–1979) known for his generalized heads and years of teaching sculpture in Latvia.
- Youri Messen-Jaschin (born 1941) known for kinetic glass and acrylic sculptures.
- Arnold Mikelson (1922–1984) known for his wood carvings.
- Vera Mukhina (1889–1953), prominent Soviet sculptor, known for Worker and Kolkhoz Woman sculpture, an example of both the socialist realism and Art Deco styles.

== R ==
- Indulis Ranka (in Latvian) (1934–2017), known for granite sculptures in the outdoor sculpture gardens the Dainas Hill and the Song Garden located in the Turaida Castle Museum Reserve.

== S ==
- Oļegs Skarainis (in Russian) (1923–2017) one of creators of the Salaspils Memorial.
- Gustavs Šķilters (1874–1954), worked with variety of materials and several styles, notably impressionism, symbolism and realism.
- Marta Skulme (1890–1962), the first professional Latvian woman sculptor. In 1924 she shared the 1st prize with Kārlis Zāle in the competition for the Freedom Monument.
- Jānis Strupulis (born 1949), sculptor and graphical designer, designed a number of modern Latvian coins.

== T ==
- Jānis Tilbergs (1880–1972), painter and sculptor, most renowned as a highly accomplished portraitist. The Latvian lats coins struck in 1924–1926 carried the palm branch design by Tilbergs.
- Vilnis Titāns (in Latvian) (1944–2006) known for stones with carved marks and inscriptions on Latvian cultural-historical sites.
- Vilhelms Treijs (in Latvian) (1892–unknown) created sculptural decor of the Court Hall of the Ministry of Justice of the Republic of Latvia, but mostly worked in memorial sculpture. He was the first chairman of the Latvian Association of the Deaf.

== V ==
- August Volz (1851–1926), known for sculptures decorating the House of the Blackheads.

== Z ==
- Kārlis Zāle (1888–1942), known for gates at Brothers' Cemetery and the Freedom Monument in Riga.
- Teodors Zaļkalns (in Latvian) (1876–1972), one of the first professional Latvian sculptors.
- Jānis Zariņš (sculptor) (in Latvian) (1913–2000) one of creators of the Salaspils Memorial.
- Valentina Zeïlé (in Russian) (born 1937) sculptor and medalist renown in Latvia and France.

== See also ==
- List of Latvian architects
- List of Latvian artists
- Culture of Latvia
