= List of Latvian architects =

Following is a list of notable architects from Latvia.

== A–K ==
- Oskars Bārs (1848–1914)
- Jānis Fridrihs Baumanis (1834–1891)
- Gunārs Birkerts (1925–2017)
- Vilhelms Bokslafs (1858–1945)
- Otto Dietze (1833–1890)
- Pāvils Dreijmanis (1895–1953)
- Mihails Eizenšteins (1867–1920)
- Johann Felsko (1813–1902)
- Karl Felsko (1844–1918)
- Aleksandrs Klinklāvs (1899–1982)

== L–Z ==
- Eižens Laube (1880–1967)
- Konstantīns Pēkšēns (1859–1928)
- Ernests Štālbergs (1883–1958)
- Edgars Zalāns (born 1967)
- Verners Vitands (1903–1982)
- Edmund von Trompowsky (1851–1919)

== See also ==
- List of architects
- List of Latvian sculptors
- List of Latvians
- Culture of Latvia
