= Gulbis =

Family name

- Pronunciation: [ˈɡuɫbis]

Origin
- Origin: Latvian
- Meaning: "swan"

Gulbis (Latvian pronunciation: [ˈɡuɫbis]; feminine: Gulbe or Gulbes) is a Latvian surname, derived from the Latvian word for "swan". Individuals with the surname include:

- Harijs Gulbis (1926–2019), Latvian writer and playwright
- Alvils Gulbis (1936–2021), Latvian basketball player
- Kristaps Gulbis (born 1967), Latvian sculptor and artist
- Ritvars Gulbis (born 1980), Latvian curler and curling coach
- Natalie Gulbis (born 1983), American golfer of Latvian descent
- Māris Gulbis (born 1985), Latvian basketball player
- Evan Gulbis (born 1986), Australian cricketer
- Ernests Gulbis (born 1988), Latvian tennis player

== See also ==
- Laura Gulbe (born 1995), Latvian tennis player
