= Ed Woodham =

American conceptual artist (born 1957)

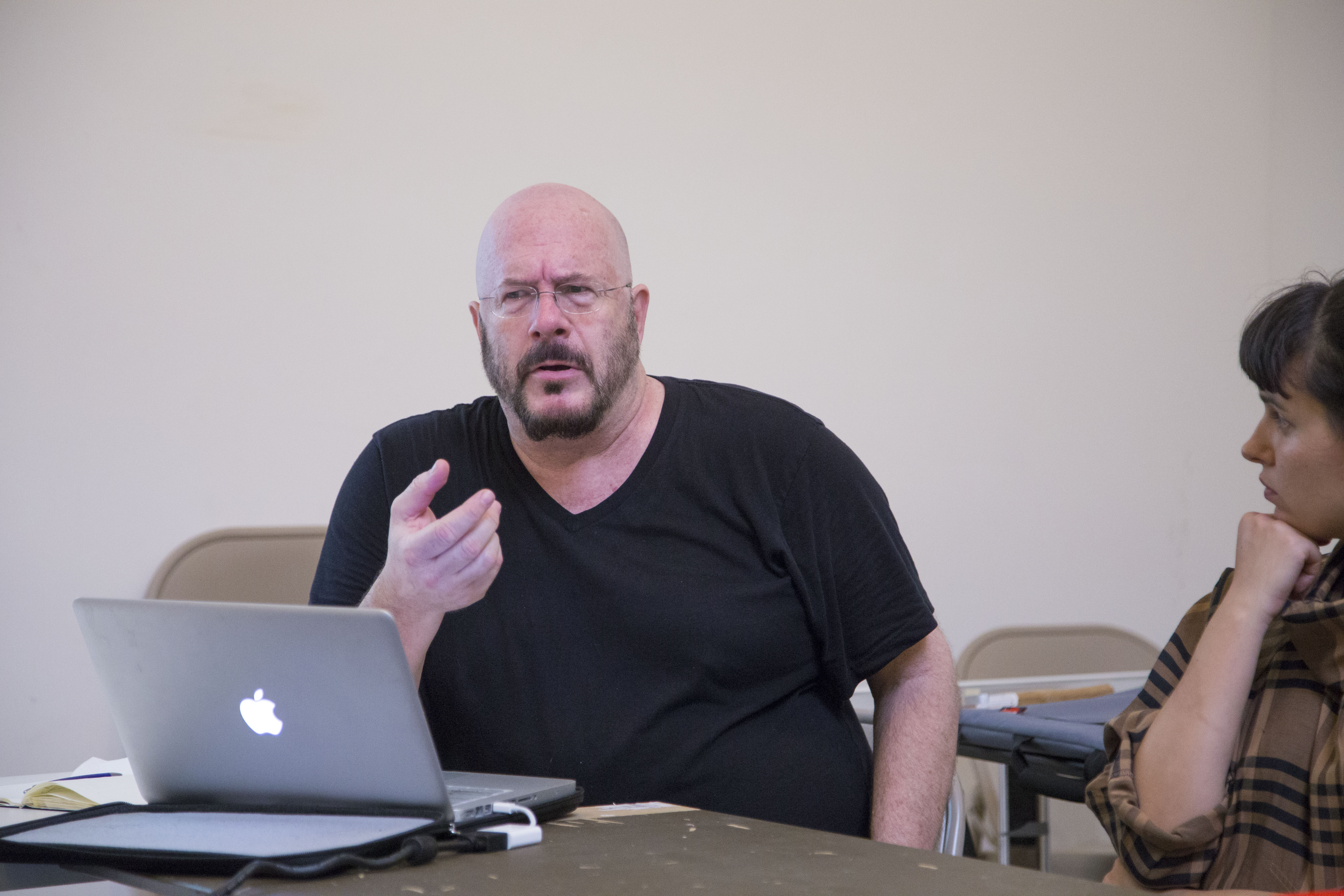
- Ed Woodham presenting at New York Arts Practicum, Residency Unlimited
- Born: 1957 (age 68–69); Atlanta, GA, US
- Education: Middle Georgia State University; Berry College (B.A.)
- Known for: Founder, Art in Odd Places; Co-founder, 800 EAST; Public Art
- Website: edwoodham.com

Ed Woodham (born 1957) is a global public artist and a NYC cultural provocateur based in the Kips Bay section of New York City. As a performer, puppeteer, and curator active in civic interventions, community art-making, and arts education for more than forty-five years, Woodham has performed and presented in Australia, Europe, and North America. He is the founder of Art in Odd Places, and the co-founder of 800 EAST, Atlanta, whose archives are housed at the Stuart A. Rose Manuscript, Archives, and Rare Book Library at Emory University.

== Early life and education ==
Woodham was born in Atlanta, Georgia in 1957. His mother, Carrol Woodham, was an artist, and his father was B.J. Woodham. He grew up as a southern queer in McDonough, Georgia. He graduated from Henry County High School in 1975, and studied for two years at Middle Georgia State University in Cochran. Woodham went on to attend Berry College in Mount Berry, Georgia, where he received a bachelor's degree in 1979.

== Career ==
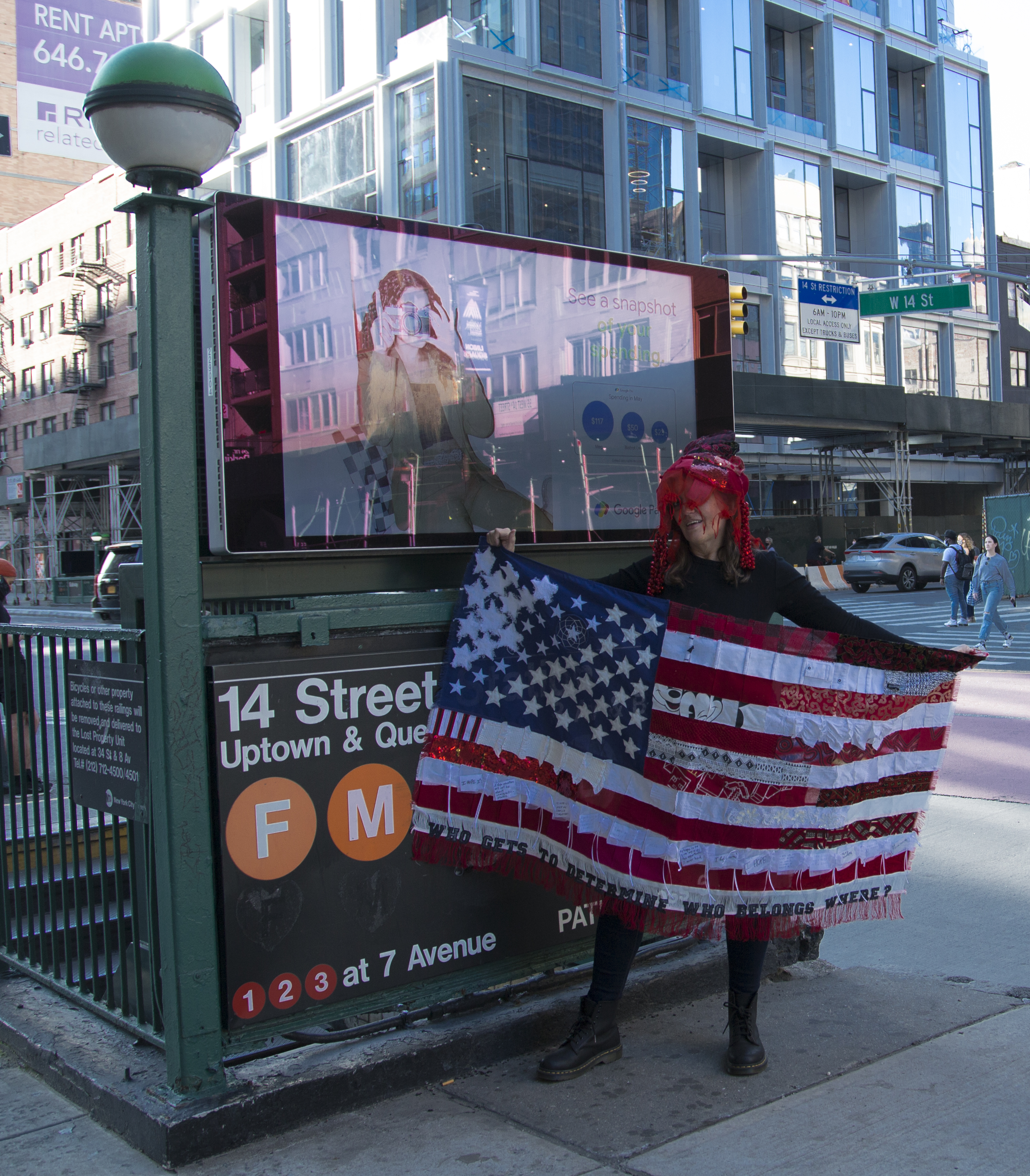
Art In Odd Places 2021:NORMAL, Julia Justo, New York. Photo: Marcela Ariaz

In 1980, Woodham moved to New York City to become a Broadway star. In 1987, he left New York and returned to Atlanta to open an arts space. Woodham managed the "Living Room", an art gallery that was staged in his living room.

=== 800 EAST ===
In 1990, Neil Fried, William Morar, and Woodham co-founded 800 EAST, and turned a derelict post-industrial space into a multi-disciplinary arts center and collective located at 800 EAST Avenue in the Little Five Points section of Atlanta. Wayne Sizemore was an 800 EAST co-collaborator. Musicians Scott Berlin, Crash Hot Man (Robert Johnson), and Michael Kilburn were involved in the organization's early years. Terry S. Hardy, an artist and curator, served on the 800 EAST board of directors from 1991 to 1997. Woodham served as director of the organization until its closure in 1998.

During its history, 800 EAST produced more than 250 visual and performance art events. In 1992, 800 EAST presented "Homo" a visual and performance art weekend, and "The Big Style Show", that featured a "Tok Sho" where artists and audience talked with each other on camera. The group's 3rd Annual "24 Hour Show" showcased performances by local bands, musicians, and other artists. In 1993, 800 EAST under the direction of Woodham and Sizemore presented the "Short Play Series", including new plays by Alice Dinnean and others. In 2017, the Stuart A. Rose Manuscript, Archives, and Rare Book Library at Emory University purchased the 800 EAST archives for an undisclosed amount.

=== Art in Odd Places ===
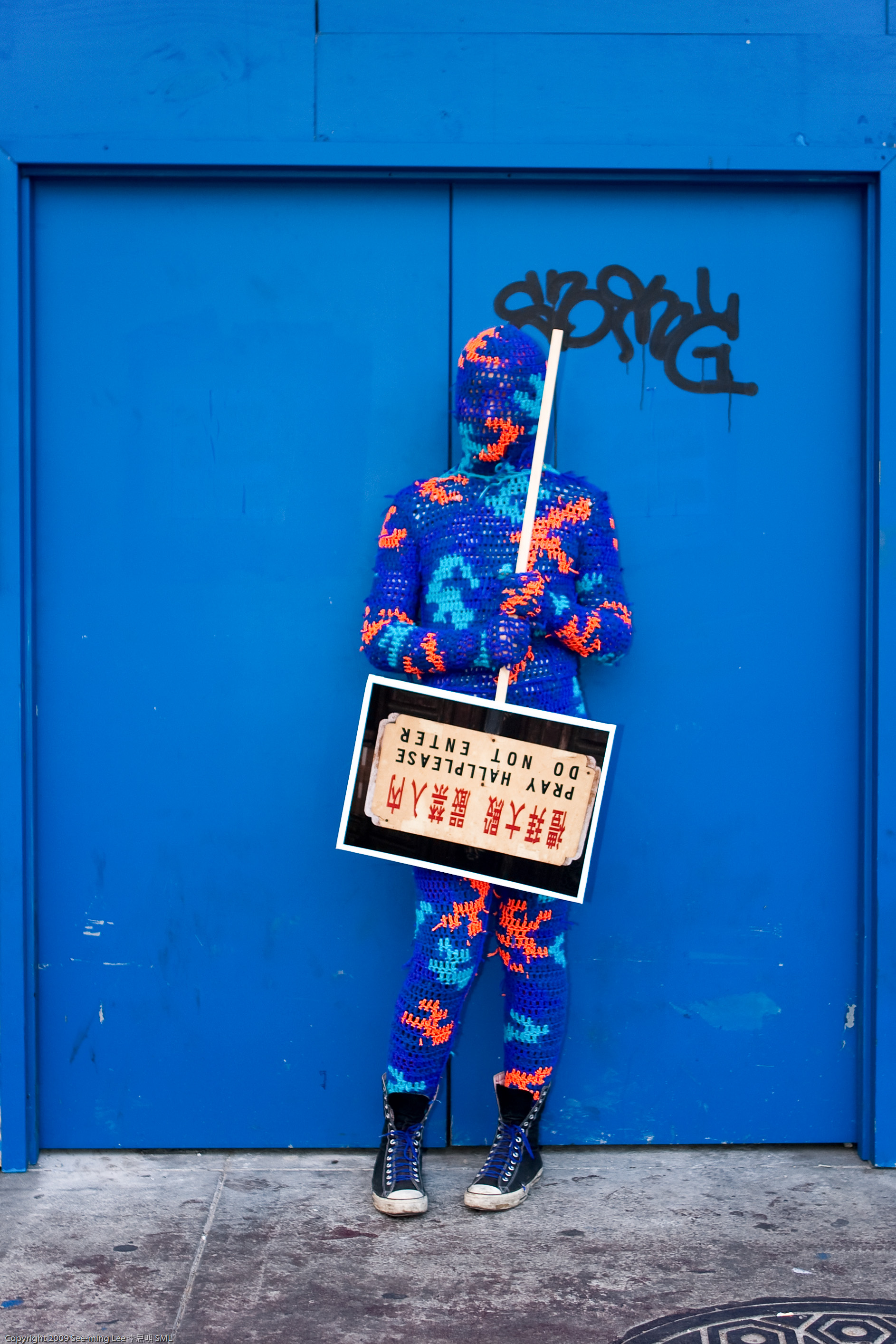
Thank You for Your Visit, Have a Nice Day (Wearable Sculpture) by Agata Olek, Art in Odd Places 2009 SIGN, New York City.

In 1996, Woodham and a group of artists founded Art in Odd Places as part of the Cultural Olympiad for the Atlanta Summer Games. Art in Odd Places was created as a response to the disappearance of public space and personal civil liberties. The organization took a hiatus from 1998 to 2005.

Since 2005, Art in Odd Places has been headquartered in New York City. The annual festival presents work in all disciplines outside of traditional public arts presentation and performance spaces, most notably along 14th Street in New York. In addition, Art in Odd Places has produced events in Boston, Massachusetts; Greensboro, North Carolina; Indianapolis, Indiana; Los Angeles and West Hollywood, California; New York, New York; Orlando, Florida; St. Petersburg, Russia; and Sydney, Australia.

In 2012, Art in Odd Places was selected as a representative in the U.S. pavilion at the 13th International Architecture Exhibition at the Venice Biennale. "Spontaneous Interventions: Design Actions for the Common Good" received a special mention from the Biennale Jury, the first exhibition in a U.S. pavilion to receive the honor. Spontaneous Interventions featured 124 urban interventions by architects, artists, city planners, designers, and others designed to bring positive neighborhood and urban solution to cities.

In 2024, Art in Odd Places was curated by husband-and-wife team Christopher Kaczmarek and Patricia Miranda,and involved more than 75 artists, roughly half the amount who submitted proposals for the festival.

In 2025, Art in Odd Places celebrated its 20th Anniversary with the multi-day outdoor festival VOICE presented by the City of West Hollywood and featuring 35 artist projects. and "Nothing" in New York City in response to the organization losing funding from the New York State Council for the Arts (NYSCA).

=== The Keepers ===
In 2016, Woodham received a commission from by The Gowanus Public Arts Initiative to create a performance piece, "The Keepers", in his neighborhood of Gowanus, Brooklyn. The "durational still performative group action" as an extension of his 2013 "Numb and Number" that was performed on the beaches of Australia. In 2023, Woodham produced "The Keepers" at three different locations near New York's Penn Station: The Church of St. John the Baptist, Gimbel's Skybridge, and the demolished Hotel Pennsylvania. The goal of "Keepers" is to raise awareness to the demolition and destruction of historic buildings and to encourage preservation of historic spaces and structures. In 2025, The Keepers at Coney Island appeared along Coney Island beaches in response to aggressive redevelopment of urban areas where historical environments and communities have been ignored.

=== Other Projects ===
From 1995 to 1998, Woodham was the founder and director of Exciting Parlor.

In 1999, Woodham created "Useful Tables", a public art commission by DreamWorks Puppetry for the New York Village Halloween Parade. The title referred to tables that are used for collection and presentation of data, i.e. Table of contents, Periodic table, and Multiplication table. During the parade, a puppeteer walked a 10 foot wooden table up Sixth Avenue for twenty-three blocks. Woodham expanded the table concept for a puppet stage and projections at St. Ann's Warehouse.

Woodham created and co-produced the Bravo documentary series, The It Factor, about actors and actresses attempting to 'make it' in Los Angeles and New York.

In 2003, Woodham performed "Constance Holiday: Hollywood Nurse" at Labapalooza! Mini Festival of New Puppet Theater in Brooklyn.

In 2016, Endicott College presented "Chickenarama," a performance installation by Linda Mary Montano and Woodham and the accompanying "Dad and Mom: Art Giving Life" gallery exhibition. "Dad and Mom" featured showed works by Montano's father, Henry Montano, and drawings by Woodham mother's Carrol Woodham, who died in 2012 from Multiple System Atrophy, and that were created during their end-of-life art therapeutic practice.

In 2016, Woodham and Samantha Hill were selected by the Macon Arts Alliance to be the inaugural artists-in-residence for the Mill Hill Visiting Social Practice Program in Macon, Georgia. The artists were scheduled to work in the East Macon Fort Hawkins neighborhood. Without notice, the Macon Arts Alliance terminated the artists two weeks into their three-month residency project.

In 2020, Woodham was a featured artist in The Babel Masks exhibition.

Woodham has performed around the world, including at 54 Columns; Art Prospect Festival, St. Petersburg, Russia; Center for Puppetry Arts; Cherry Lane Theater; Eramboo Art Environment, Sydney, Australia; EyeDrum, Atlanta; HERE Arts Center; High Museum of Art; Indianapolis Museum of Art; Le Poisson Rouge; Lincoln Center Out of Doors; Old Stone House; Orlando Museum of Art; Siren Arts, Asbury Park, New Jersey; St EOM's Pasaquan, Buena Vista, Georgia; Telfair Museum; and other venues. In 2025, he was part of the inaugural performance art biennial, The Enduring Power of Play, at Open Source Gallery in Brooklyn. In addition, Woodham operates the Showroom Gallery in the Kips Bay/Murray Hill section of New York City.

== Teacher and speaker ==
Woodham is a faculty member of the Visual and Critical Studies Department at the School of Visual Arts, where he teaches Social Malpractice Art. Since 2013, he has been an Invited Artist Faculty member at NYU's Hemispheric Institute. In addition, he has taught at Wilson College's MFA program in Chambersburg, Pennsylvania.

In 2013, Woodham delivered a Tedx Talk in Gowanus, New York, In 2014, he presented, "Public art as social engagement" as part of TEDxIndianapolis.

At Columbia Teachers College, Woodham serves as visiting speaker for the Arts Administration program.

== Quotable ==
- "Absurdity is an aesthetic choice that reflects my politics."
- "It is vital for Art in Odd Places to always be an artwork–a new work of art created by the team of each edition."

== Awards and honors ==
- Blade of Grass Fellow in Social Engagement, Jim Henson Grant -- 2013
- Artist-in-Residence, thedrawing(shed) residency, London, to create "IdeasFromElse[W]here", a performance work in Lloyd Park, East London -- 2014
- Public commission and residency, Jamaica Center for Arts and Learning, Queens, New York --2015
- Advisor, Expo 2020, Dubai, UAE -- 2015
- Artist-in-Residence, Hambidge Center -- 2017
- Artist-in-Residence, Smith Gallery, Appalachian State University -- 2017
- Artist-in-Residence, Studio Arts Board, University of Virginia -- 2018
- MacDowell Fellow and Artist-in-Residence, MacDowell Arts Center -- 2019
- Artist-in-Residence, City of West Hollywood, California -- 2019-2020
