= Daugavpils Theatre =

Theatre in Daugavpils, Latvia

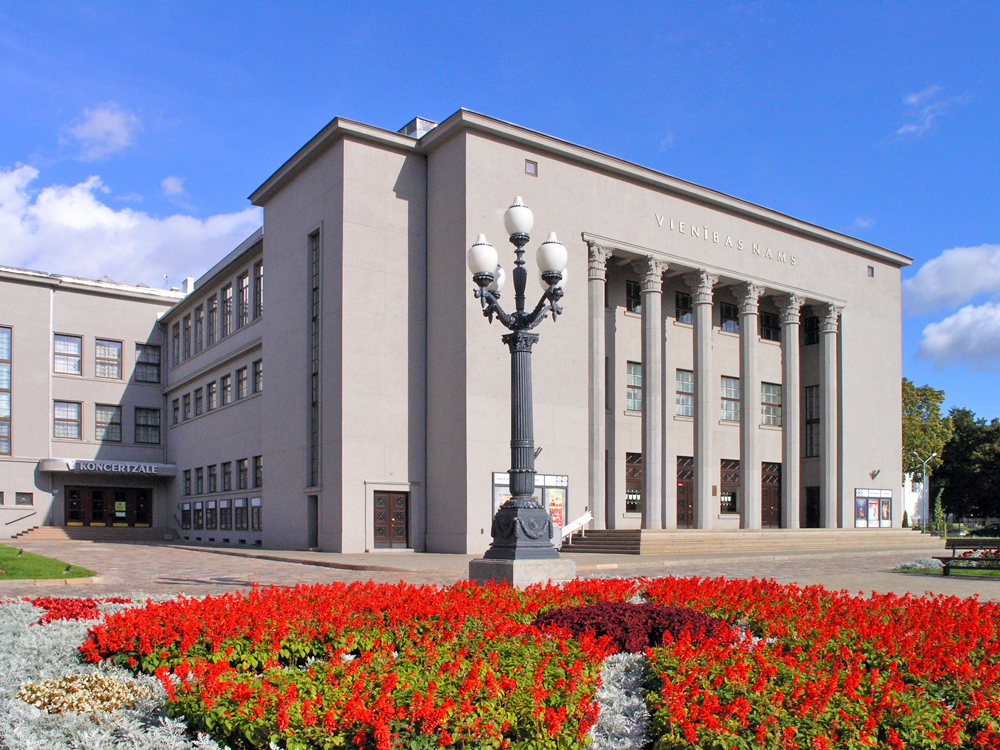
- Daugavpils Theatre lies in Unity House. Built in 1937-1938, architect Verners Vitands.

- Location within Latvia
- Address: Daugavpils, LV-5401, Latvia
- Coordinates: 55.8704859°N 26.5162645°E

Construction
- Opened: 1857

Daugavpils Theatre (Latvian: Daugavpils teātris) is a theatre in Daugavpils, Latvia.

Daugavpils Theatre was founded in 1857 and is one of the oldest professional theatres in Latvia, as well as the only permanent professional theatre in the Latgale region. It stages plays in the Latvian, Russian and Latgalian languages.
