= 54 Columns =

Public art installation in Georgia, US

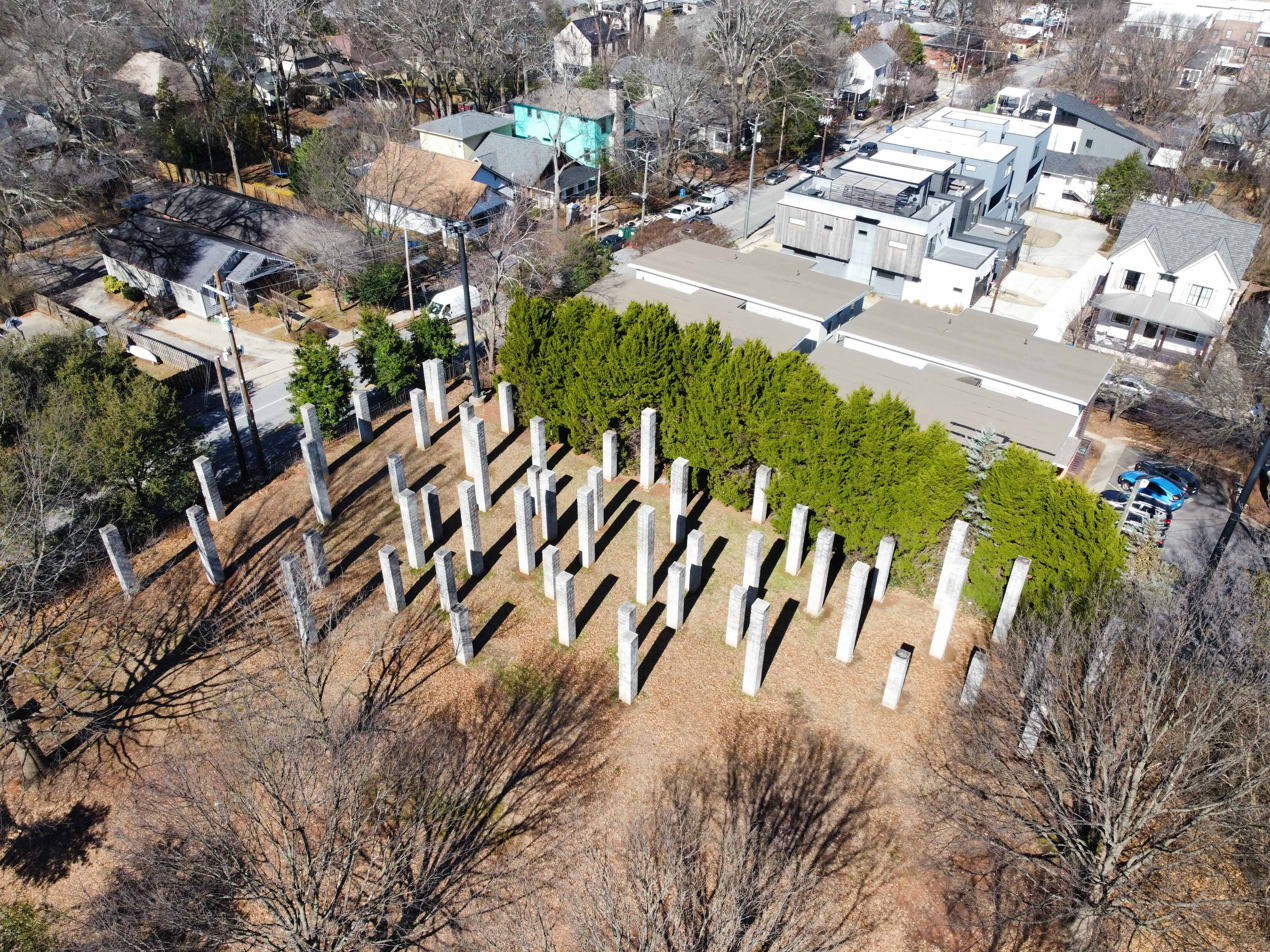
Drone View of 54 Columns - 2023

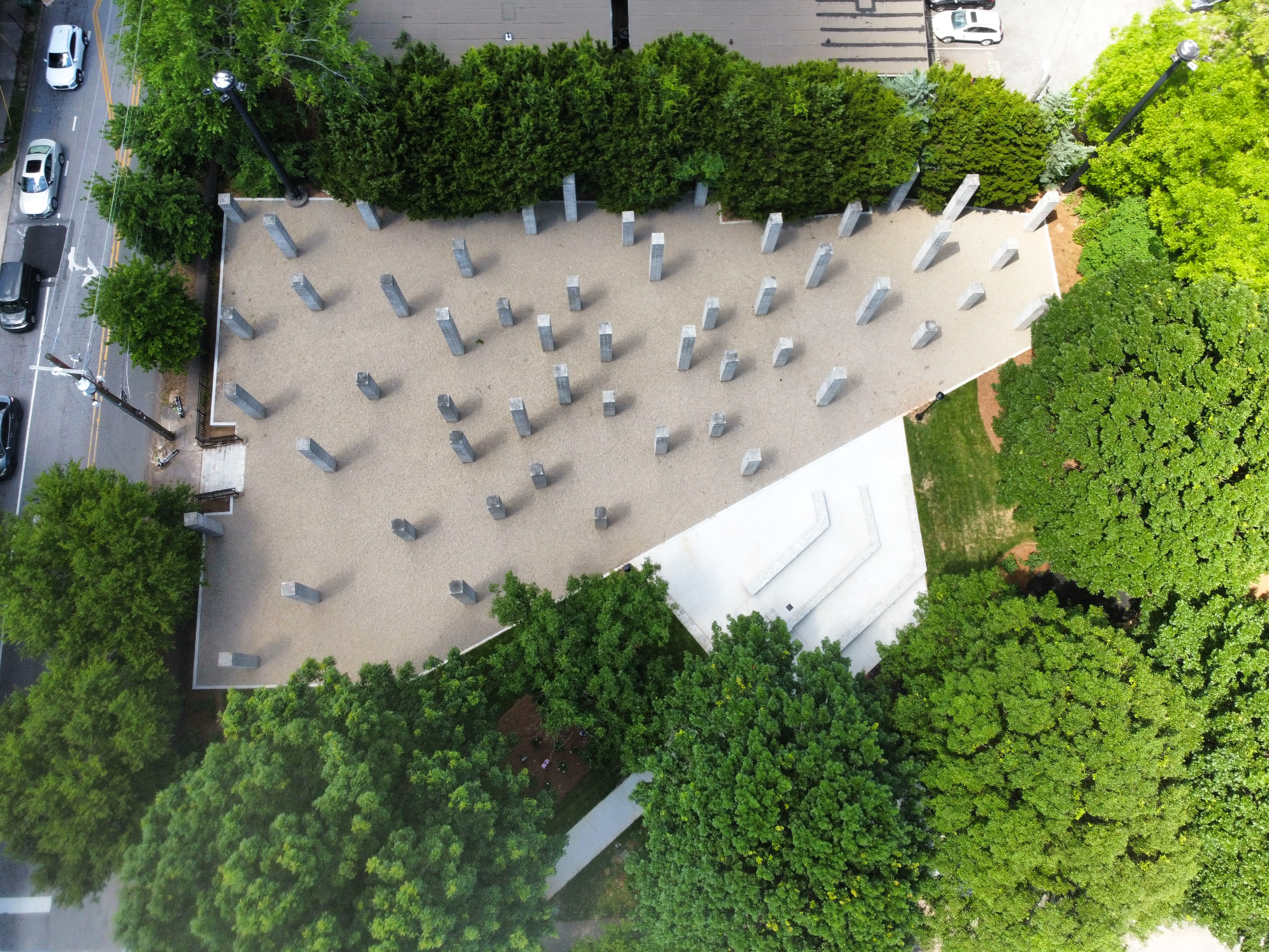
Drone View of 54 Columns - After 2024 Renovation

54 Columns is a public art installation in Atlanta, Georgia, US by artist Sol LeWitt. Located at the corner of Glen Iris Drive and North Highland Ave, the large-scale sculpture consists of 54 concrete columns in a grid-like arrangement. The overall shape of the installation is approximately triangular with dimensions of 112 x 176 feet (34 x 54 meters). The columns range in height from 10 to 20 feet (3.05 to 6.1 meters).

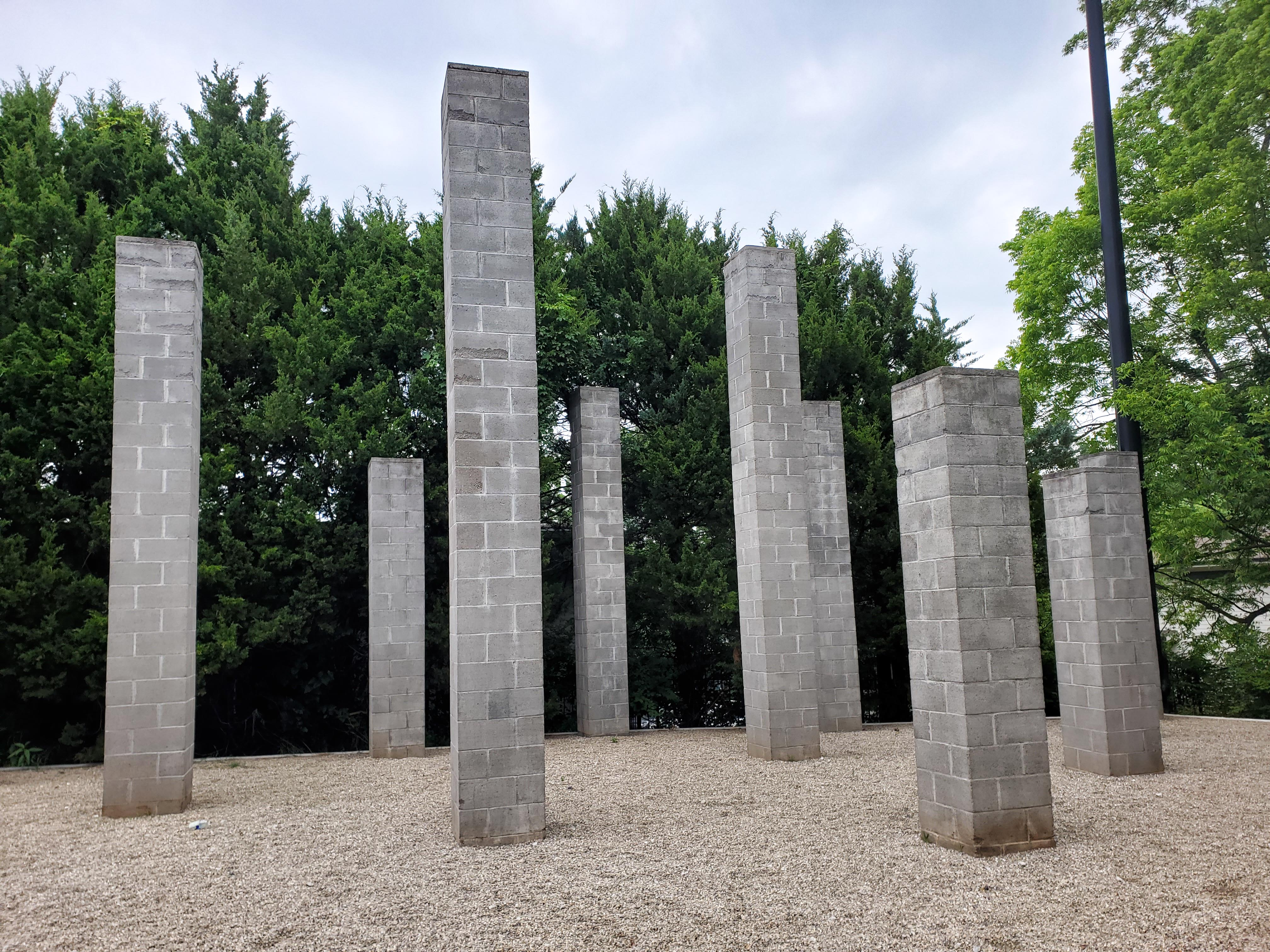
Typical Columns

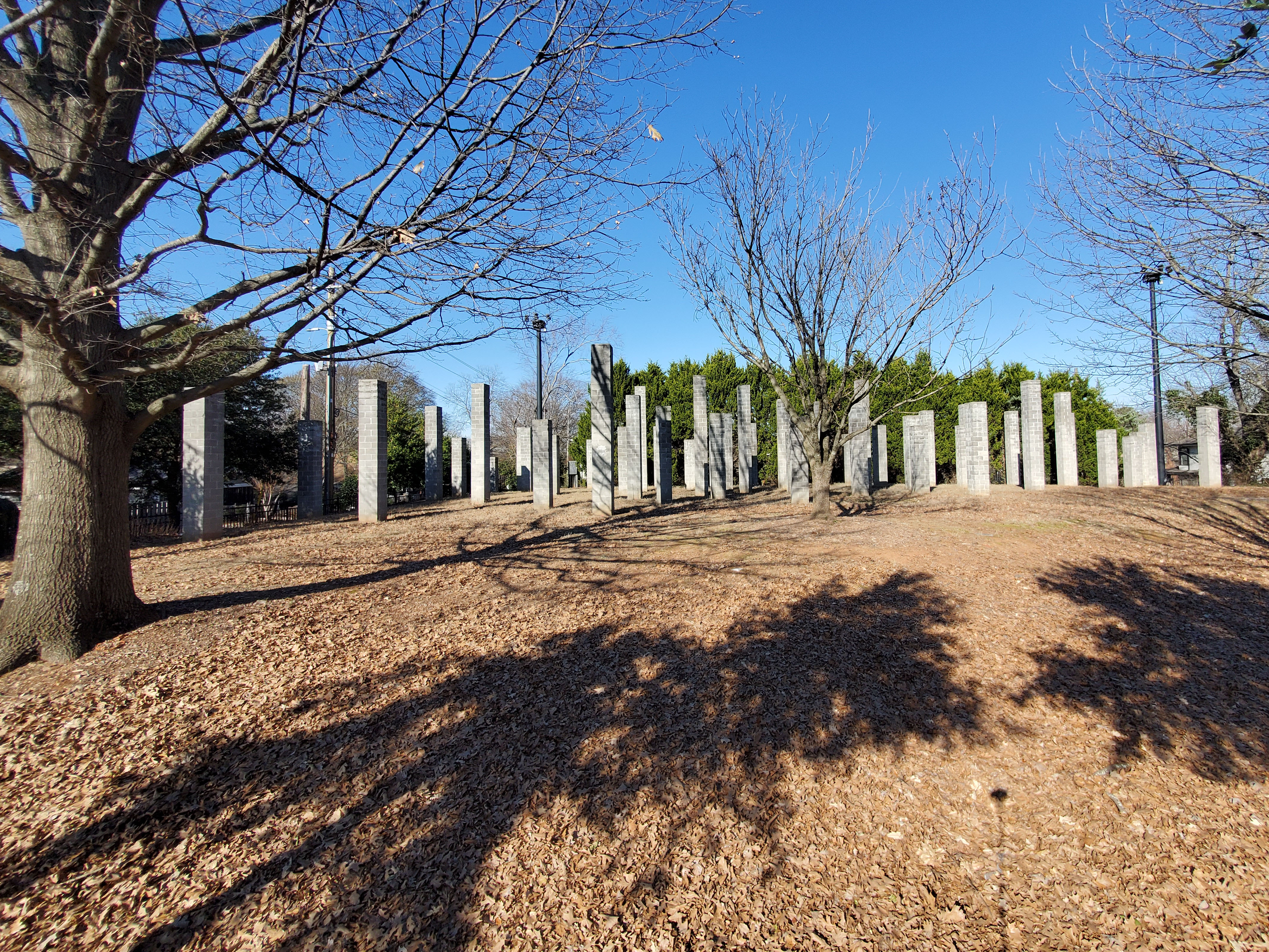
Street View of 54 Columns - 2023

== Background ==
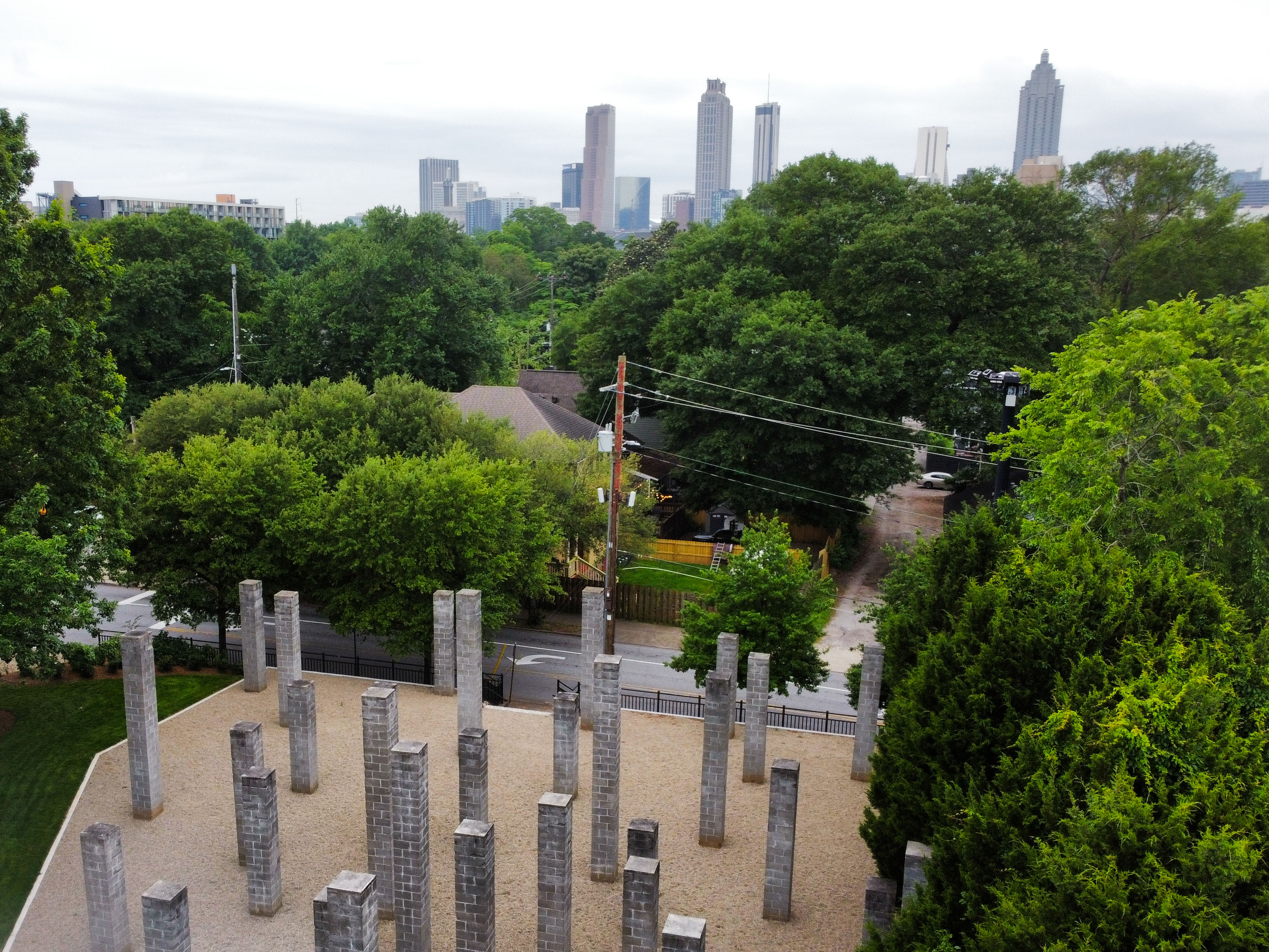
Atlanta Skyline Seen From Above 54 Columns

Sol LeWitt is regarded as a pioneer in the movements of both minimal art and conceptual art. LeWitt often integrated art and architecture in his work. 54 Columns is an example of this combination. The installation loosely mirrors the Atlanta skyline which is visible from the site. The use of concrete (an industrial material) by LeWitt is a recognition of and a reflection of the artwork's urban setting. The Mark and Judith Taylor Family and other private donors assisted by the High Museum of Art made this gift to the people of Fulton County possible. At the time of installation, Gregor Turk, Fulton County's public art coordinator called LeWitt's abstract representation "simultaneously lowbrow and highbrow."

== History ==
In the mid 1980s, Fultion County began the 15 year-long process of developing, approving and implementing a public arts plan. During that time, Chuck Taylor (Son of Mark and Judith Taylor) founded and chaired the Fulton County Public Arts program. The Taylor family owned a piece of property that they wanted to donate to Fulton County to be used for a public art project.

LeWitt was a friend of Mark Taylor's. LeWitt had previously worked with the Taylor family to install Wall Drawing #729, Irregular Color Bands, currently in the rotunda of the High Museum of Art. As a favor to Mark Taylor, LeWitt waived his fee to execute a public art project on the Taylor's property at the corner of Highland Ave and Glen Iris Drive in Atlanta's Old Fourth Ward neighborhood.

LeWit's initial proposal resembled a 40-foot-tall pyramid split apart unevenly at an angle and then turned sideways. Fulton County rejected the first design fearing that the rift in the sculpture might provide a climbing hazard to children. LeWitt's second proposal – 54 Columns – was accepted. This minimalistic sculpture was commissioned by the Fulton County Arts Council in 1999. The year following its completion, 54 Columns was declared to be one of the 24 top public art projects by Art in America.

== Controversy ==
Neighborhood resistance to the sculpture began immediately upon the project's completion. According to Gregor Turk, the Old Fourth Ward was plagued by long-term neglect, white flight and redlining. A crack house was located two doors down the street. The neighborhood expressed concern that the sculpture would provide a venue for drug use and prostitution, would represent gentrification foisted onto the neighborhood by outside forces and would present an unsightly appearance.

Here is a quote from Turk about how LeWitt responded to neighborhood concerns about the sculpture's appearance: "A request was made by a community panel to have LeWitt paint the columns like his colorful interior wall painting at the High Museum. He refused. The panel came back asking him to at least paint the columns a solid color. He acquiesced by agreeing to stain the columns. He selected a gray stain that matched the color of the concrete."

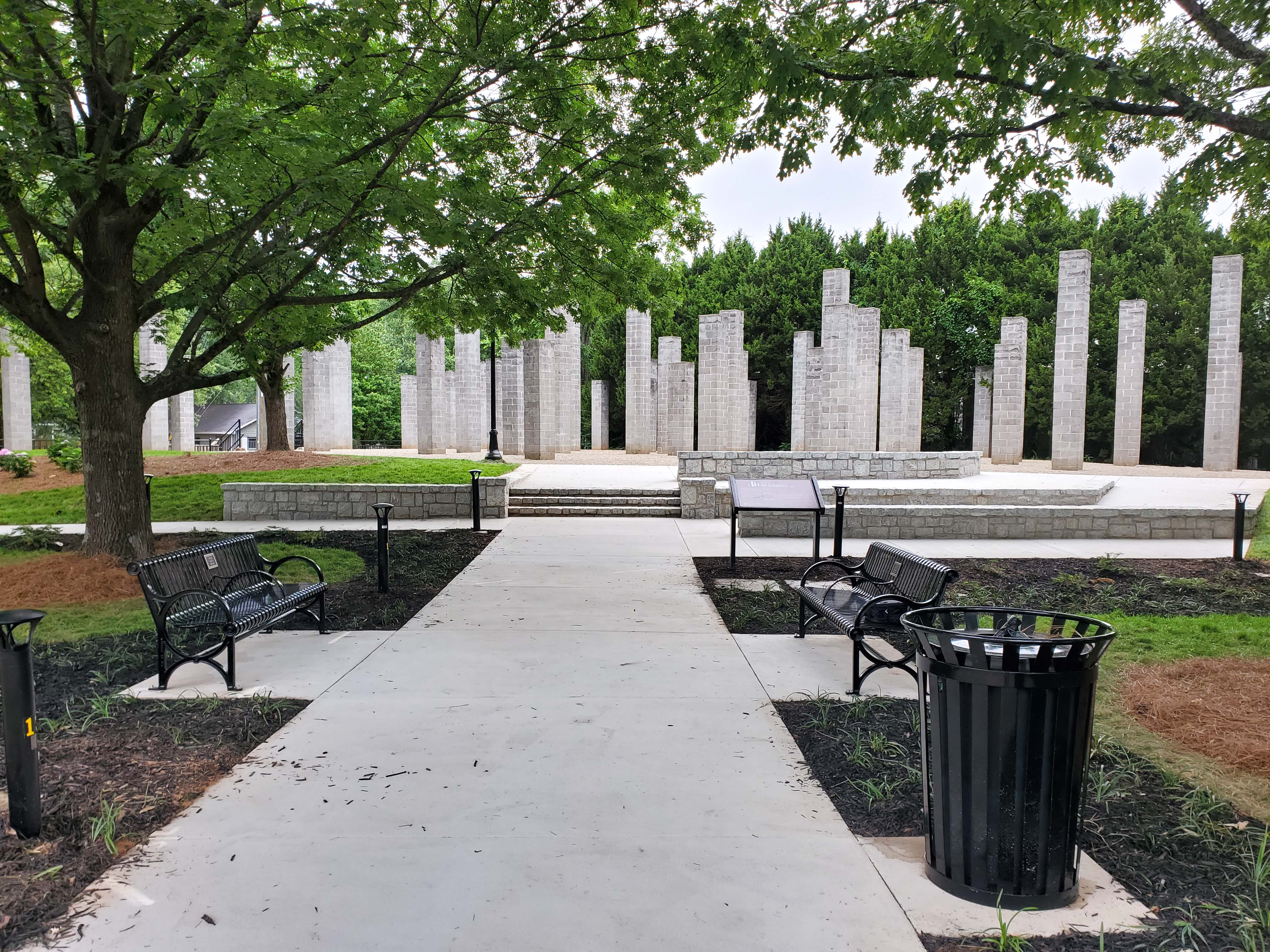
Street View of 54 Columns and New Entrance Path - 2024

54 Columns was often mistaken for an unfinished and abandoned construction site and inconsistent maintenance of the lot did not help the situation. In 2003 local residents displeased with the look of the concrete structures planted dogwood trees among the columns to cover them up. The City of Atlanta determined that "the trees spoiled the sanctity of LeWitt's installation" and the dogwoods were removed. In 2005, one of the columns was painted pink.

== Renovation in 2024 ==
In 2021 as part of a wider plan of neighborhood improvement, President and Vice President of Fourth Ward Neighbors Tom Boyle and Hollis Wise met with Chairman of the Fulton County Board of Commissioners Rob Pits at the site of 54 Columns. Boyle and Wise presented a sketch of proposed site improvements to Chairman Pitts and made a pitch for $100,000 to fund the project. Chairman Pitts responded: "If I can't get $100,000 for a worthwhile project, then I don't deserve to be here."

In 2022, the Fulton County Board of Commissioners approved $100,000 (US) to renovate 54 Columns. The revitalization includes a new entrance path, seating for events, lighting, upgraded landscaping and signage. The upgrade was completed in 2024 transforming a mostly empty and sometimes overgrown lot into a beautifully landscaped park worthy of the internationally acclaimed art installation that serves as the park's centerpiece. The ribbon cutting ceremony for the revamped park was held on May 18, 2024 with various dignitaries and Taylor family members making speeches to a crowd of about 200 attendees. At the ceremony, Atlanta City Councilman Amir Farokhi said that the renovation "has transformed this site from a question mark to an exclamation point."

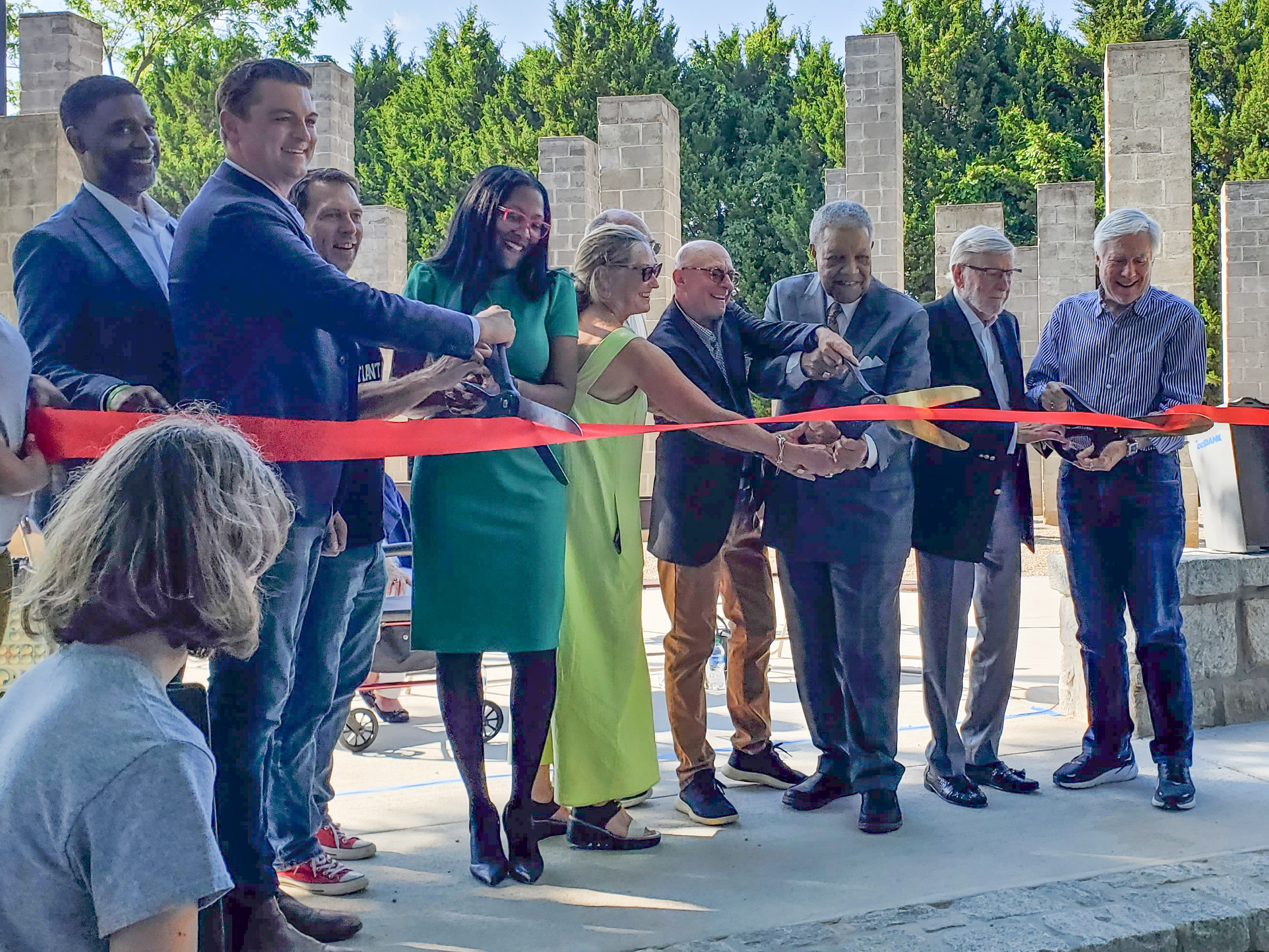
Ribbon Cutting Ceremony at 54 Columns after 2024 Renovation: (L to R): Director of Fulton County Arts & Culture David Manuel, Atlanta City Councilman Amir Farokhi, Atlanta City Council President Doug Shipman, Fulton County Commissioner Natalie Hall, VP of Fourth Ward Neighbors Hollis Wise, Neighborhood Project Leader Terry DiNatale (mostly hidden behind Hollis Wise), President of Fourth Ward Neighbors Tom Boyle, Atlanta City Council Chairman Robb Pitts, 54 Columns benefactors Mark Taylor and Chuck Taylor
