= Kristaps Gulbis =

Latvian artist (born 1967)

- Born: July 26, 1967 (age 59); Riga, Latvia
- Education: The Estonian Academy of Arts
- Occupations: Sculptor; Artist
- Notable work: Monument to Freedom (2018), Belgium; The Pine Trees of Rainis (2014), Latvia; Pink House (2005), 51st Venice Biennale
- Spouse: Daina Jāņkalne
- Father: Aivars Gulbis

Kristaps Gulbis (born 26 July 1967) is a Latvian sculptor and artist known for numerous contemporary art projects in more than 25 countries. His works have been exhibited at the Venice Biennale, the Museum of Modern Art in Hokaido, Japan, and at metropolitan sites in London, Paris, Rome, Berlin, Riga, Moscow and other European cities, as well as in New York, Seoul, and Kaohsiung, Taiwan. The visual art projects curated, directed and managed by Gulbis have been set in England, Hungary, Germany, Latvia, Estonia and elsewhere in Europe.

Some of the artist's most notable work include his project Pink House (together with Aigars Bikše) presented at the 51st Venice Biennale, Italy; the Monument to Freedom (2018) in Belgium, and The Pine Trees of Rainis (Raiņa Priedes; 2014) in Latvia commemorating the famous Latvian poet and playwright Rainis.

Gulbis has lectured at various US universities and art centres across Europe, Asia and the US. Some of the most notable include the University of Southern California (UCSC) and the University of New Mexico. In 2012 Gulbis was the SPARC's International Artist in Residence and has collaborated with the Bank of America, CEC Artslink, the Lower Manhattan Cultural Council (LMCC), the McColl Center for Art and Innovation and other international institutions. He has been the Leitrim Sculpture Centre artist-in-residence in Ireland, as well as one in Sapporo, Japan, the United Kingdom, Italy, Austria, the United States, South Korea, Taiwan and other countries.

== Career ==
In 1991 Gulbis graduated the Estonian Academy of Arts and since have been active in the international art scene. His first solo exhibition in 1992 in Riga was quickly followed by the second in 1993. Shortly after in 1996 his work could already be seen in Italy, Poland, Moscow and Germany before spreading to a wider international scene encompassing the US, Asia and the rest of Europe.

In 2016 Gulbis co-founded the design company Kiel Arto Design in collaboration with P.Kalnins adapting an innovative, unique and environmentally friendly approach to product design and functional art. Kiel Arto Design was showcased in the 2017 and 2018 Architectural Digest Design Show in New York City, US and the ICFF in Miami and was handpicked by Architectural Digest as one of the '17 On-the-Rise Designers You Should Know Now' about.

As a recognised artist Gulbis has appeared as a speaker, guest and expert in various TV and radio shows, publications, discussions, talks and debates.

Works by Gulbis can be found in the permanent collections and storage vaults of the Latvian National Museum of Art and the Tartu Art Museum.

In recent years Gulbis has been a recognised Expert for the European Commission Creative Europe project.

== Works ==
Kristaps Gulbis has been exhibited alongside numerous recognised artists, as well as being solo exhibited in art centres, museums and public spaces, and produced nationally and internationally recognised monuments and sculptures. He has been portrayed by Lisa Esherick.

=== Projects and monuments ===
- The Teodors Hermanovskis Monument (2020), Monument, Jaunjelgava, Latvia
- The Jūrmala White Seagull (Jūrmalas baltā kaija; 2020), an environmental object, Latvia
- Monument to Freedom (2018), Monument to Latvian Legionnaires and Freedom, Zedelgem, Belgium
- The Pine Trees of Rainis (Raiņa Priedes, 2014), Monument, Amatas street, Jūrmala
- CacheArt, a contemporary art form created by Gulbis, based on GPS utilisation leading to mixed interactive and observative contemporary art.
  - CacheArt (2010), Lower Manhattan Cultural Council (LMCC), New York City, US
  - CacheArt. 14th Street (2012), AiOP (Art in Odd Places), an internationally recognised large-scale art festival, New York City, US
  - CacheArt. Is this one real? (2014), Environmental Art Park Ii, Finland
- National Costume of European Union (2006), 25 European Union member countries
- Pink House (2005)(together with A.Bikse), The 51st Venice Biennale, Venice, Italy
- Chairs (2000), an open air object, Cooperations, Luxembourg.
- Investigating Airspace (2000), Sculpture in Woodland, County Wicklow, Ireland

=== Exhibitions ===
==== Solo exhibitions ====
- Sheehans Mobile (2006), Solo Exhibition, Leitrim Sculpture Centre, Manorhamilton, County Leitrim, Ireland
- Pink House Project (2006), Ludwig Museum - Museum of Contemporary Art, Budapest, Hungary
- Freedom is so Sweet (2003), Solo Exhibition, Origo, Riga, “S.A.S.E.” and Sapnu Fabrika, Riga, Latvia.
- King-size Seat (2001), Solo Exhibition, Aldaru Street, Riga, Latvia.
- The Summer of my Homeland (1998), Solo Exhibition, The Gallery of Latvian Artists Union, Riga, Latvia.
- European Province Collection (1996), Solo Exhibition, The Gallery of Latvian Artists Union, Riga, Latvia.
- The Scaffold (Ešafots; 1993), Solo Exhibition, Multimedium sculpture, The 2nd French - Baltic videoart festival, Galleria Riga, Latvia Later (1995) exhibited on the Danish ship Kronborg.
- Identification of Everyday Ideas (1992), Solo Exhibition, Sculptors Centre, Riga, Latvia.

==== Collaborative exhibitions ====
- Kinship Scripts (2018), Collaborative; Showcasing the Gulbis's Latvian artist dynasty, Art gallery Museum LV, culture centre GrataJJ, Latvia
- Wilderness (Savvaļa, 2018); Collaborative exhibition (vs Aivars Gulbis, M. Gulbis, B.Gulbis); Showcasing the Latvian artist dynasty of Gulbis family, Latvia
- Big Kiss (2015), Collaborative exhibition, Sound of Sormland, Sweden
- The Free Press Club (2015), Art station Dubulti, Latvia
- CacheArt. Is this one real? (2014), Environmental Art Park Ii, Finland
- European Cultural Canon (2013), Riga, Latvia
- CacheArt. 14th Street (2012), AiOP (Art in Odd Places), an internationally recognised large-scale art festival, New York City, US
- My Little Secret (2012), Skulpturenpark Katzow, Germany
- Listen to Me with Eyes (2011), CIAC Centro Internazionale per l'Arte Contemporanea, Rome, Italy
- Hear Me Out (2011), CIAC Centro Internazionale per l'Arte Contemporanea, Genazzano, Italy
- Drifting Identity Station (2011), open space, Vienna, Austria
- 4 x Gulbis (2010); Collaborative exhibition (vs A.Gulbis, M.Gulbis and B.Gulbe), Siguldas Tower, Sigulda, Latvia
- Monument to People of Riga – the First Crossers of the Lielupe River and The Train Hasn't Left Yet (2010), Lielupe, Latvia.
- La Escultura en Norte V (2009), Salas, Spain
- Communicative Integration and Understanding (2009), Katrineholms Konsthall, Katerineholm, Sweden.
- Homo Urbanus - Homo Sapiens? (2008), Amsterdam, the Netherlands.
- The Camouflash - Disappearing in the Art (2008), Prager Spitze - Dresden City Center, Dresden, Germany
- Camo-flash (2007), Łódź, Poland
- The Republic of Speku Street (Speka ielas Republika, 2007), Riga, Latvia.
- Esanze (2007), Liepāja, Latvia
- Sens-in-place. SiteAtions Europe 2006 (2006), Reykjavík, Iceland
- The Lucky Ones (2006), Jūrmala City Museum, Latvia
- Stilla Kaos (2005), Rydals Museum & Alingsas Konsthall, Sweden
- Esanze (2005), Rennes, France.
- Stepping Across Borders (2004), Hokkaido Museum of Modern Art, Sapporo, Japan
- It's a New Day Again... (2004), Steel Sculpture festival, Kaohsiung Museum of Fine Arts, Taiwan
- Me and You (Mina ja Teine, 2003), Tallinna Kunstihoone, Tallinn Art Hall, Tallinn, Estonia
- Top – Top (2003), Jūrmala, Latvia
- At Last There is a Place to Have a Cup of Tea with Friends (2003), Lake Vyrnwy, Wales, United Kingdom
- Tempo di Scultura (2002), Kunstihoone, Tallinn, Estonia
- Cambio Constante III (2002), Real Monasterio de Santa María de Veruela, Zaragosa, Spain
- Riga – Jurmala by Train (2002), Jūrmala, Latvia
- Sagadi 2002 (2002), Sagadi, Estonia
- Artfront/Waterfront (2002), Newhouse Gallery, New York, U.S.
- Metropole. Riga. (2001), Riga Stock Exchange, Riga, Latvia
- Bridge (2000), Zvartava Castle, Latvia
- Residents 1999/2000 Artists@Tryon Center (1999), Charlotte, U.S.
- 2nd International Site-specific Art Symposium (1999), Sigulda, Latvia
- 3rd International Environment Art Festival at "9 Dragon Heads (1998), Chongju, South Korea
- Kunst in der Landshaft IV (1998), Prigglitz, Austria
- Theatre in the Forest (1997), Grizedale Forest Sculpture, Grizedale, England
- 4th International Environment Art Project "LSAP- 97" (1997), Wahtberg, Austria
- Contemporary Latvian Sculpture (1997), State Art Museum, Tartu, Estonia
- Moscow Forum of Art Initiatives (1996), State exhibition hall Maly Manez, Moscow, Russia
- Natur & Kunst - 5th International Sculpture Symposium (1996), Muritz National Park, Waren, Germany.
- ARTE SELLA - International Art Meeting (1996), Borgo Valsugana, Italy
- 2nd International Sculpture Symposium (1996), Wigry National Park, Poland

=== Biennials ===
- The Art Ii Biennial (2014), CacheArt, Finland.
- The Mediation Biennial (2008), Here's no security cameras, Mediations Biennial, Poznan, Poland.
- The 51st Venice Biennale (2005), Pink House project (with A.Bikse), Venice, Italy.

=== Quadrennials ===
- The Sculpture Quadrennial Riga (SQR) (2000), The Big Wilting Baltic Egg, Riga, Latvia.
- The Sculpture Quadrennial Riga (SQR) (1996), Riga, Latvia.

=== International artist residencies ===
- Artist-in-residence (2010), Lower Manhattan Cultural Council, New York City, U.S.
- Artist-in-residence (2007), Leitrim Sculpture Centre, Manorhamilton.
- Artist-in-residence (2002), Hokkaido Museum of Modern Art, Sapporo, Japan.
- Artist-in-residence (2000), Cooperations, Luxembourg
- Artist-in-residence (1999–2000), Tryon Centre for Visual Art, Charlotte, U.S.
- Artist-in-residence (1997), Grizedale Sculpture Park, England, UK

=== Curating ===
- The Train Hasn't Left Yet (2010), 8 railway stations connecting Riga and Jūrmala, Curator, Latvia.
- European Space Sculpture Quadrennial Riga (2008); Contemporary in-city art project, Curator, The Centre for Art Management and Information (MMIC).
- Generation Europe and Pink House (2005); Curator, Venice Biennale, Italy; Bremen, Germany; Łódź, Poland; Budapest, Hungary; Birmingham, UK; Riga, Latvia.
- European Space Sculpture Quadrennial Riga (2004), 75 artists and institutions, 25 countries; Contemporary in-city art project, Curator, The Centre for Art Management and Information (MMIC).

== Personal and early life ==
In 1967 Kristaps Gulbis was born into the notable Latvian artist family Gulbis. His parents are Aivars Gulbis, the famous Latvian sculptor and artist, and Agija Sūna, the long-time LTV journalist, former ballerina and the founder and owner of the private art gallery Asūna. He has two sisters, also artists. Some of the family's extended history is depicted in the memoirs In-between the Laws of Five Powers (Starp piecu varu likumiem) by Gulbis's grandfather, first published in 2018.

In 1994 Gulbis married the TV and radio personality, producer and director Daina Jāņkalne. Together they have 3 children, Gustavs Gulbis, Paulīna Klīva Gulbe and Amēlija Gulbe. Their current family residence is in Latvia.

== Activism ==
In 2020 Gulbis together with a group of other Latvian artists started a political movement against the newly reformed Latvian Government law proposed to change artists' royalties. The movement resulted in multiple pop-art projects, flash mobs and public discussions. Broadcast by the Latvian National Television, Gulbis met on-air with the Minister of Culture of Latvia Nauris Puntulis to discuss the topic and later attended a closed-door meeting with the President of Latvia Egils Levits.

The movement resulted in successfully reforming the proposed royalties' law.

== Awards and prizes ==
- CEC ArtsLink Grant (2010), New York, U.S.
- Scholarship of the Culture Capital Foundation (2003), Riga, Latvia.
- Latvia UNESCO-Aschberg Scholarship (2000); The culture capital foundation Riga, Latvia.
- Artslink Independent Partnership Program Grant (1999), Artslink, New York, U.S.
- KKF Grant (1998), Riga, Latvia.
- Artist of the Year (1997), The Gold Medal of Latvian Artists Union.

== Publications ==
The mentions of Gulbis's work and life can be found in various publications. A non-exhaustive list as follows:

- Sūna, J. (2018) In-between the Laws of Five Powers (Starp piecu varu likumiem). Memoirs, p224. Riga: Jumava.
- Slava, L. (2001). Digital Archive, Archive Catalogue and Library Catalogue of BALTIC Centre for Contemporary Art and BALTIC's Project Space, 47.
- Kiel Arto Design.
