= Art in Odd Places =

- Abbreviation: AIOP
- Formation: 1996
- Purpose: Cultural
- Headquarters: New York, NY
- Co-founder and director: Ed Woodham
- Website: Art in Odd Places

Art in Odd Places (AiOP) is an international public art project based in New York City exploring connections between public spaces, pedestrian traffic, and ephemeral transient interventions. In New York, an annual event takes place each October along 14th Street in Manhattan from Avenue C to the Hudson River. AiOP has also hosted events in Australia and Europe.

== Background ==
In 1996, a group of artists led by Ed Woodham founded AiOP as part of the Cultural Olympiad of the 1996 Olympics in Atlanta. AiOP was created as a response to the disappearance of public space and personal civil liberties. Each year, AiOP curates at least one large-scale project. AiOP took a hiatus from 1998 to 2005. Since 2005, AiOP has been headquartered in New York City.

The annual festival presents work in all disciplines outside of traditional public arts presentation and performance spaces, most notably along 14th Street in New York. In addition to New York City, AiOP has produced events in Boston, Massachusetts; Greensboro, North Carolina; Indianapolis, Indiana; Los Angeles and West Hollywood, California; New York, New York; Orlando, Florida; St. Petersburg, Russia; and Sydney, Australia. During AiOP events, pedestrians happen upon the artwork by coincidence while others (like a scavenger hunt) use a map to discover art in unexpected places.

=== Mission ===
Art in Odd Places aims to stretch the boundaries of communication in the public realm by presenting artworks in all disciplines outside the confines of traditional public space regulations. AiOP reminds us that public spaces function as the epicenter for diverse social interactions and the unfettered exchange of ideas. Projects have included a performance addressing the issues of public vs. private as it applies to the public restroom, to art teams activating space by cleaning the sidewalks of 14th Street in Manhattan.

== Timeline ==
In 2006, Art in Odd Places presented "Imagining New Public Space", a panel to discuss alternative public places for art. The panel was presented in collaboration with Radhika Subramaniam, founder of interdisciplinary art journal, Connect:art.politics.theory.practice and Setha Low, president of the American Anthropological Association, with panelist: Bill Brown of Surveillance Media Players; Clarinda MacLow, choreographer and performer; and Melbourne's Paul Carter, philosopher and artist from the Lab Architecture Studio.

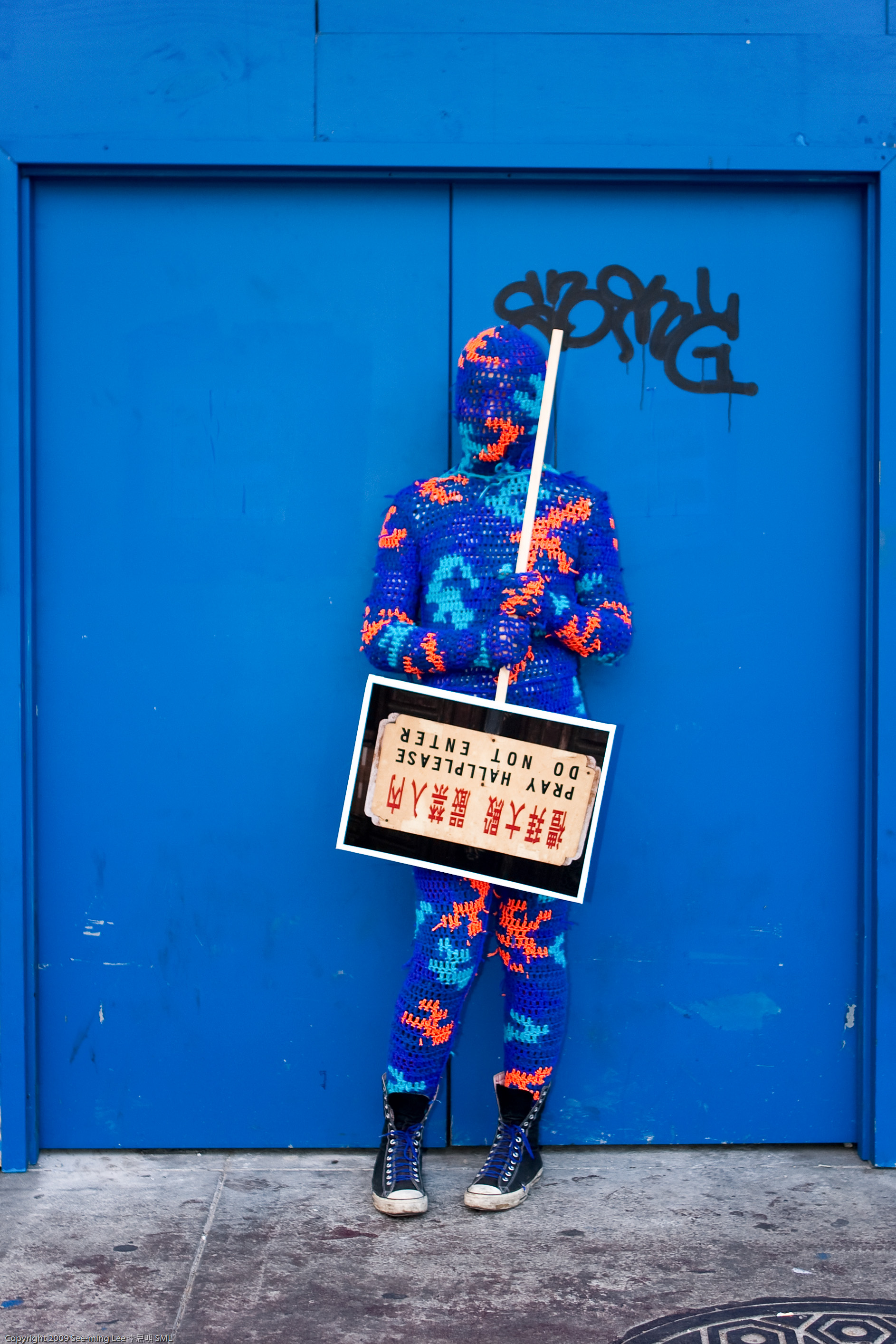
Thank You for Your Visit, Have a Nice Day (Wearable Sculpture) by Agata Olek, Art in Odd Places 2009 SIGN, New York City.

In 2012, Art in Odd Places was selected as a representative in the U.S. pavilion at the 13th International Architecture Exhibition at the Venice Biennale. "Spontaneous Interventions: Design Actions for the Common Good" received a special mention from the Biennale Jury, the first exhibition in a U.S. pavilion to receive the honor. Spontaneous Interventions featured 124 urban interventions by architects, artists, city planners, designers, and others designed to bring positive neighborhood and urban solution to cities.

In September 2015, more than fifty artists from around the world participated in "Art in Odd Places: 2015/TONE Orlando".

In May 2021, Art in Odd Places (AIOP) 2021: NORMAL launched a series of installations, performances and visual art along 14th Street. It was curated by artist Furusho von Puttkammer and featured Akiko Ichikawa, Gretchen Vitamvas, Jonothon Lyons, Ivan Sikic, Yeseul Song, Yasmeen Abdallah, Julia Justo, Sara Lynne Lindsay and dozens of other artists.

In 2024, Art in Odd Places was curated by husband-and-wife team Christopher Kaczmarek and Patricia Miranda,and involved more than 75 artists, roughly half the amount who submitted proposals for the festival.

In 2025, Art in Odd Places celebrated its 20th Anniversary with the multi-day outdoor festival VOICE presented by the City of West Hollywood and featuring 35 artist projects. and "Nothing" in New York City in response to the organization losing funding from the New York State Council for the Arts (NYSCA).
