= Verners Vitands =

Latvian architect

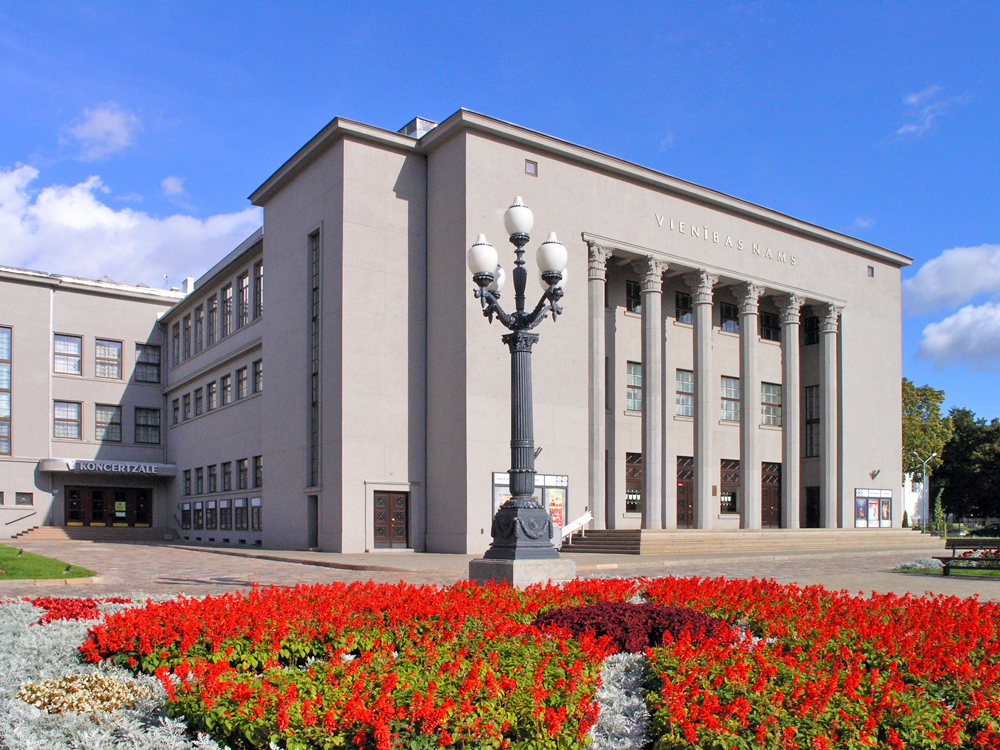
- Unity House in Daugavpils
- Born: July 3, 1903; Lizums parish, Cesis district, Russian Empire (now Latvia)
- Died: January 14, 1982 (aged 78); Kalamazoo, Michigan, US
- Occupation: Architect

Verners Vitands (July 3, 1903 – January 14, 1982) was a Latvian architect. Vitands designed the Unity House in Daugavpils in 1936-1937. He was responsible for a number of important public buildings of 20th-century modernist design, better known as functionalism in Latvia, constructed in Latvia in the first half of the 20th century.

== Biography ==
Verners Vitands was born in the family of miller in 1903 in Lizums Parish, then part of the Governorate of Livonia in the Russian Empire. He first studied at Sinole Parish School, Smiltene School of Commerce and Longīns Ausējs Real School in Cesis. Upon graduation in 1923 from Riga Secondary School No.2 he studied architecture at the University of Latvia. He graduated from the Faculty of Architecture of University of Latvia in 1932, where he attended workshop of the Professor P. Kundzins. Upon graduation he worked at the construction directorate of Latvia Ministry of War and also had his own private practice. In 1931 the modern three stories army barracks of the Latgale Artillery Regiment in Krustpils were built as designed by V. Vitands. He also designed a guard house in Indra, Madona's Guards House with relief of a soldier "Sargs" (sculptor K. Zemdega, presently building used as House of Culture). At a time of it completion in 1935 Madona Guards House was the largest new building in Latvia outside Riga.

In 1933 Verners Vitands in his capacity as private architect created project of a modern single family home. Like his big, government sponsored projects this single family home also was an example of modernist trends of functionalism and harmony with surroundings. Among family houses he built there are several notable ones, such as built in 1933 two story wooden cottage in Riga's Torņakalns neighbourhood, home of Latvian poet Jānis Akuraters. It has been restored to it original condition and now houses poet's memorial museum.

Vitands designed the Unity House in Daugavpils in 1936-1937. At 78,000 m3 it was the largest building that have been built in Latvia during the 1930s. He was one of three architects invited by Latvian Society to participate in a building design competition and his project won the contest. It was also favorite of Latvian Architects’ Society. Presently building design characterised as "monumentalism characteristic of authoritarian period of the Republic of Latvia".

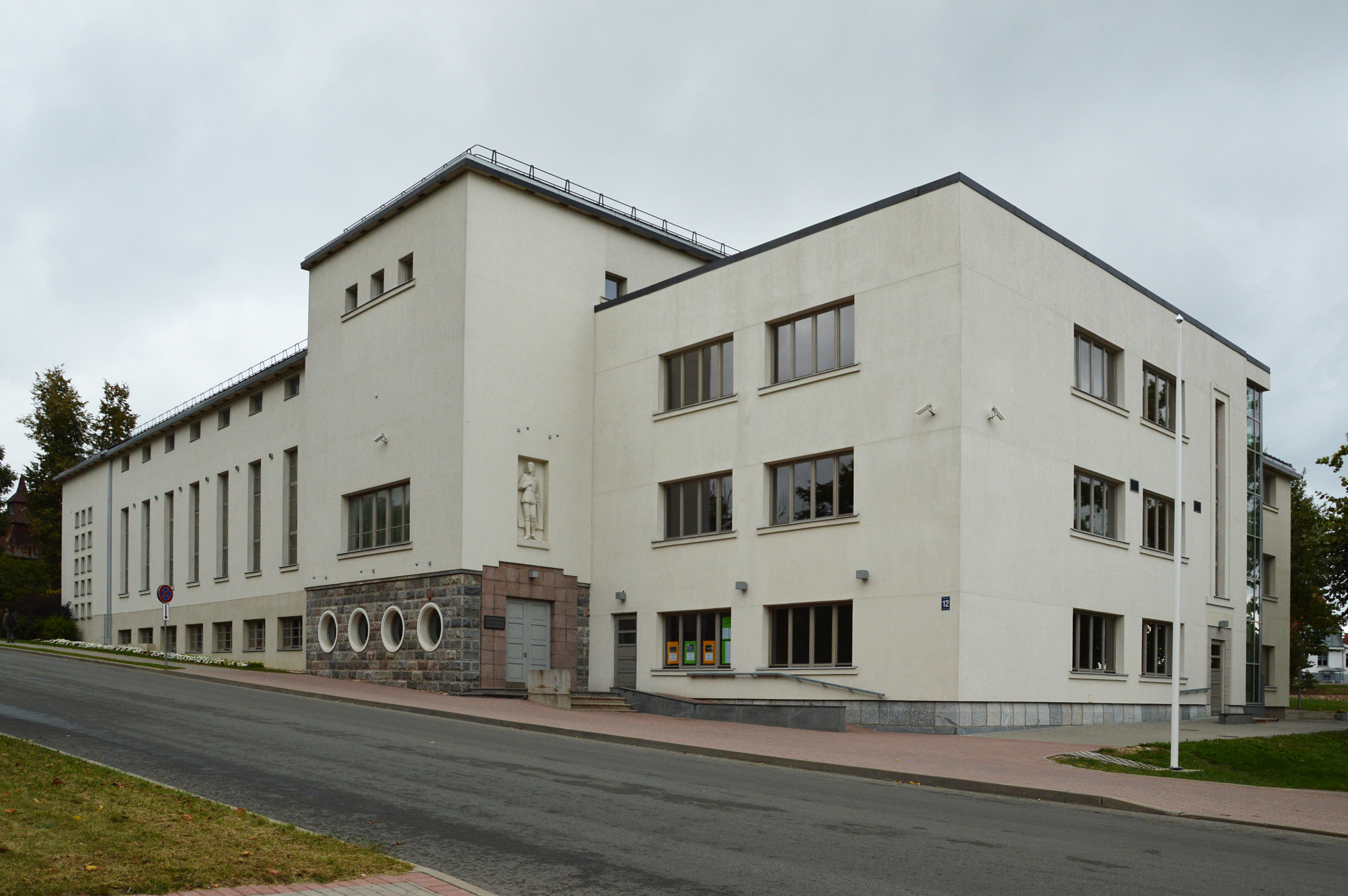
Madona town cultural centre (1935)

Verners Vitands also designed several monuments where he drew on both Modernism and Art Deco influences. These monuments still enjoy considerable acclaim both for its historical value and artistic impression. He created Monuments in Smiltene (1937, in cooperation with sculptor M. Pluka), in Indra (1939) and in Riga (1939, in the former Regiment barracks of tank car, in cooperation with sculptor R. Feldbergs).

== World War II and later life ==
In 1941-1943, during World War II, Verners Vitands remained in Latvia and was working as a teacher in the Riga Technical College and as an assistant in the University of Latvia. In 1943 Verners Vitands with his family relocated to Czechoslovakia, and at a later date to Germany. Finally in 1949 Verners Vitands emigrated with his family to the United States. He settled in Kalamazoo, Michigan where he found employment utilizing his professional skills. He contributed into cultural and social life of Latvian emigrant community in USA.

He was married to Zenta Vitands.

== Legacy ==
- Unity House in Daugavpils, now functioning as a theater, remains city architectural highlight. Building has commemorative plate with architect name on it.
