= Anthony White (artist) =

Australian painter (born 1976)

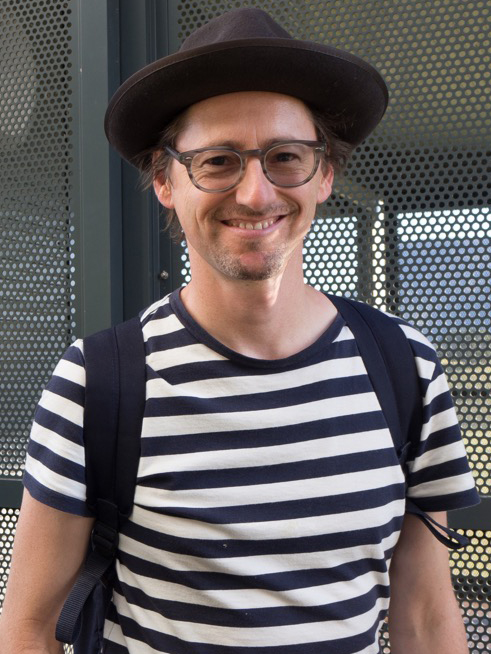
- White in 2018
- Born: 1976 (age 49–50)
- Education: The National Art School Sydney
- Known for: Painting, Contemporary Art
- Website: www.anthonywhite.art

Anthony White (born 1976 in Sydney, Australia) is an Australian visual artist. A National Art School, Sydney, graduate, White has worked and lived in Paris since 2009. White has held solo exhibitions in Melbourne, Sydney, Paris, Latvia, London and Hong Kong.

== Art Practice and themes ==
Landscape and architectural references are used in White's work across the disciplines of drawing, painting, collage and sculpture.

Writer Robert Maconachie wrote that, “White's artistic work revolves around the notion of reclaiming the act of dissent through the production of cultural objects. His research is situated at the intersection of several fields in the social space including, politics, human rights, and postcolonialism. His practice is centered around concepts of design and its history as a form of social and political expression. He works with painting, drawing, collage, and printmaking. Through this practice, he tackles relevant questions to our time, to encourage emancipation and new ways of thinking.”

== Career ==
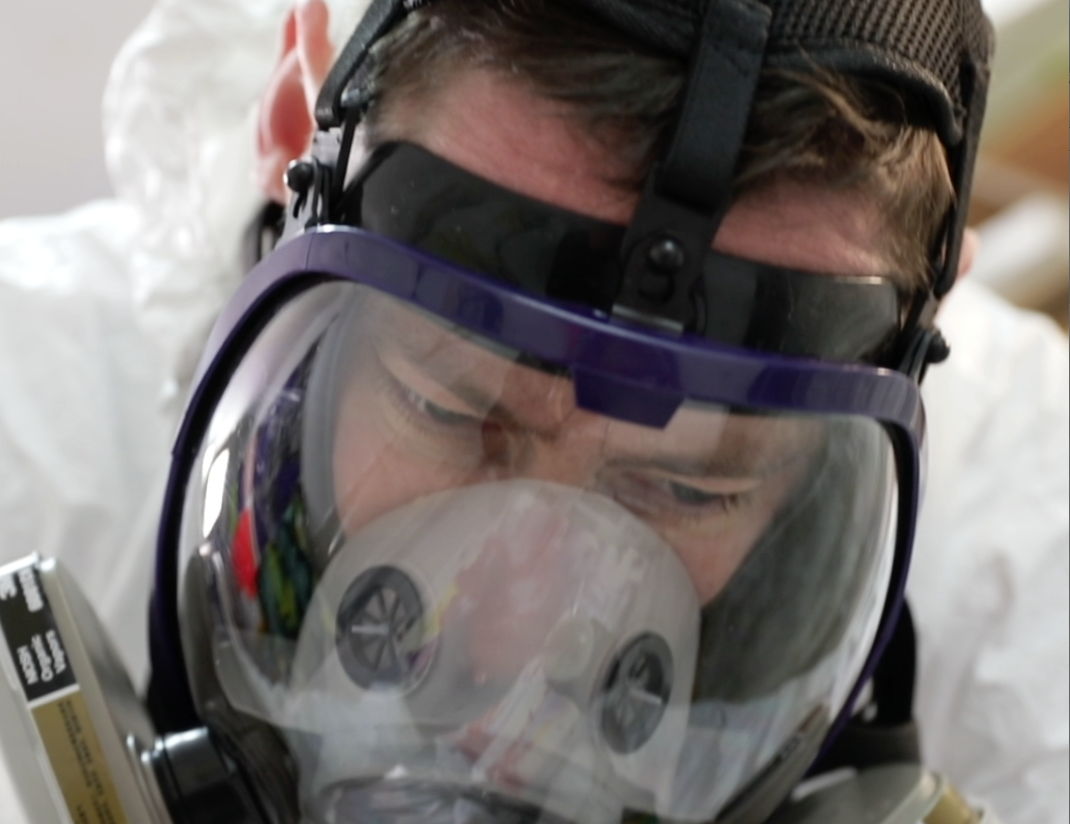
Anthony White, Image from Video Trailer from Signs of Civilisation, 2018

Anthony White grew up in Sydney, New South Wales, and obtained his bachelor's degree in Fine Arts (B.F.A) at the National Art School, Sydney in 2005. He received instruction under contemporary Australian-Romanian artist Aida Tomescu. He also obtained a Diploma of Creative Studies at the School of Creative Arts, Sydney in 2002, and trained at the Marathon Program at The New York Studio School, New York in 2007, before relocating to Paris, France in 2009.

Over the past two decades of his career, White has exhibited globally, and achieved critical acclaim through international residency programmes and major art prizes. White's work is held in major public and private collections internationally, and he has received acknowledgements in The Australia Financial Review, Art Collector Magazine Australia and Elle Décor.

== Exhibitions and residencies ==
White has been awarded a number of international commissions and residencies, which have reportedly been influential in developing his body of work, surveyed in White's solo exhibition at Le Pave D'Orsay, Paris (2014).

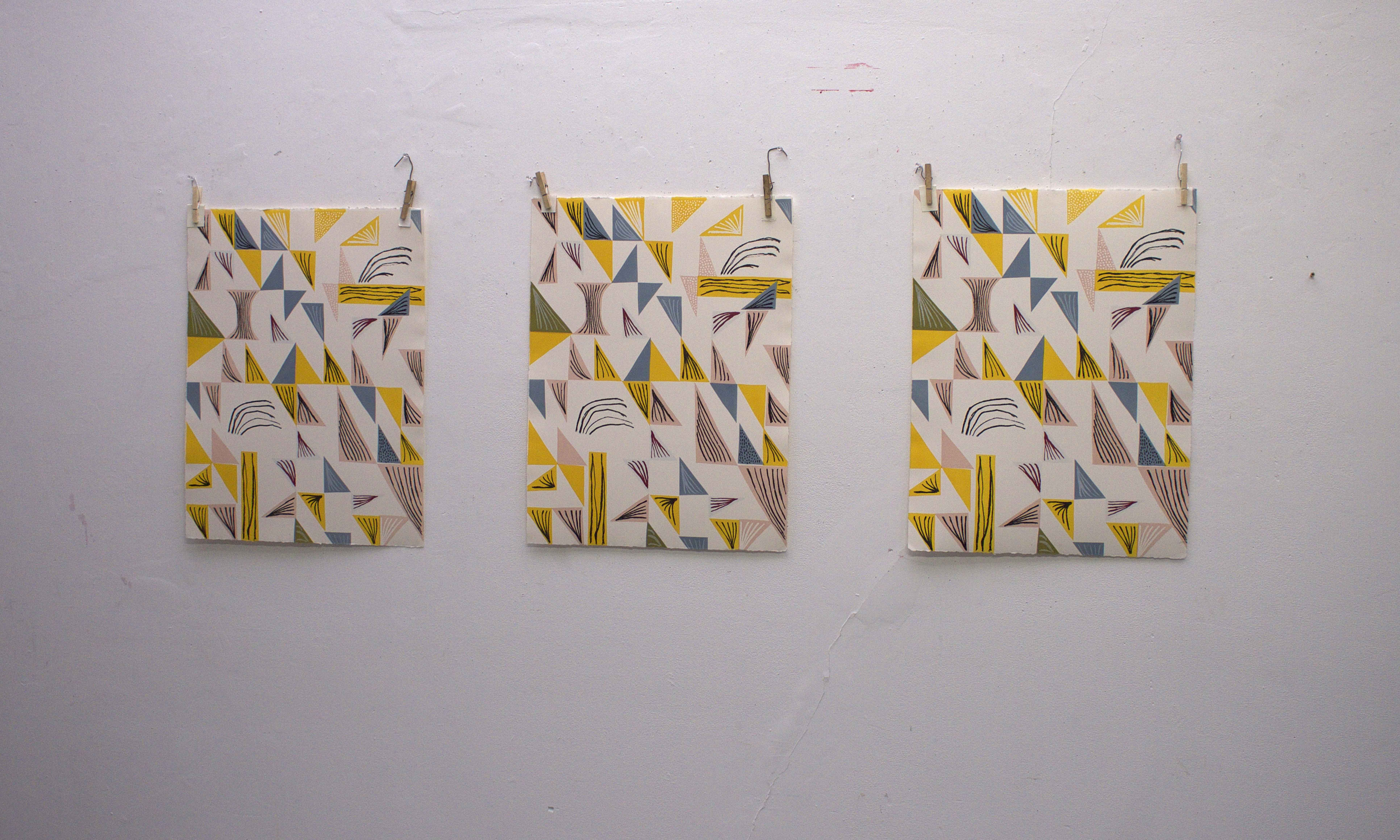
Anthony White, Michael Woolworth editions, 2015

White received funding from the Australian Copyright Agency Ltd Career Fund in August 2015 to attend a lithographic printmaking workshop with Michael Woolworth in Paris. This resulted in the production of a seven-colour lithograph.

White's 2018 work, shown in the exhibition Signs of Civilization, reflected a move to socially engaged practice. Art writer Jane O'Neill says, "White takes some cues from earlier activist artists such as Yves Klein or the post-war Japanese Gutai movement. Yet the driving force behind these works is Franz Kafka's 1919 novel In the Penal Colony, a story that pre-empts the current refugee crises throughout the Pacific. White describes how the exhibition "continues my sustained enquiry into the relationship between Modernism and colonialist concepts of empire." In doing so, he asserts the role of the artist as inherently political and urges us to consider the role of artistic interventions in the current climate."

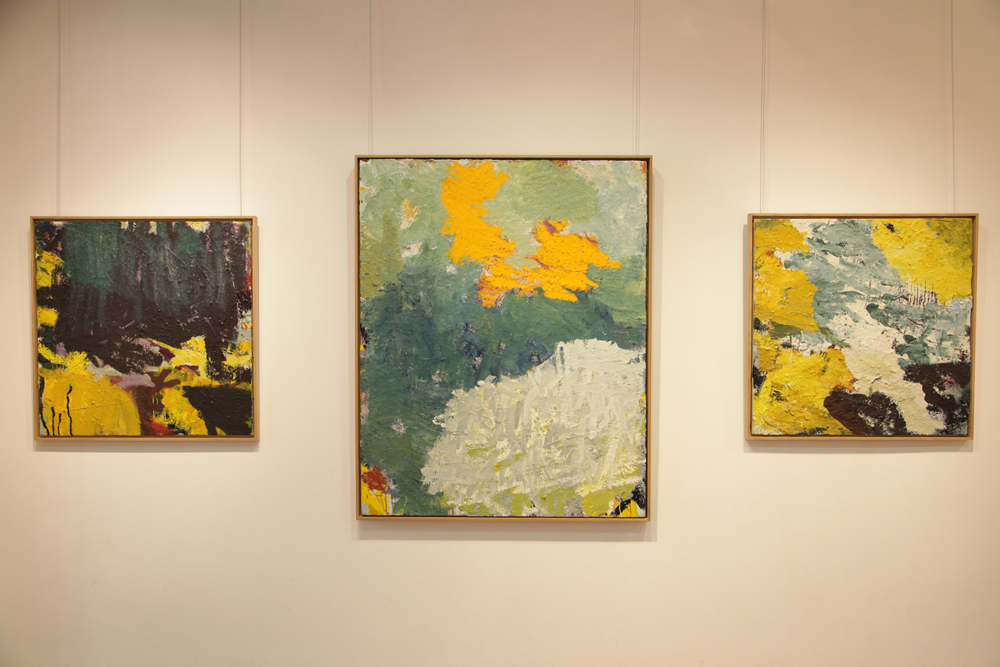
Anthony White, Le Pave D'Orsay, Paris, 2014

White presented his major solo exhibition Mobilising Material with The Mark Rothko Art Centre in Latvia in 2022. The exhibition centred around personal emancipation by raising questions about surveillance, detainment and injustice in Western capitalist civilisation.

In 2020, White was awarded the Creative Arts Fellowship to conduct research into the National Library of Australia's collection relating to Sidney Nolan. The fellowship was delayed until 2022 due to international travel restrictions. In the interim, White collaborated with Informality and the Sidney Nolan Trust to present a virtual exhibition at the Rodd, Nolan's former home in Wales. White resumed the Creative Arts Fellowship in 2022 and investigated Nolan's Eureka Stockade mural that informed a new body of abstract paintings presented in his 2023 exhibition Manifestation with Lennox St Gallery.

White also presented work in the 2021 Luxembourg Art Fair, and exhibited in Spring1883 and The Spirit of Place at Macquarie University, both in 2023.

=== Solo exhibitions ===
- 2023 Manifestation at Lennox St.Gallery Melbourne Australia
- 2022 Mobilising Material, The Mark Rothko Art Centre, Daugavpils, Latvia
- The Golden Door, Ecole de Beaux Arts Comairas, Fontainebleau, France
- The Ghost Series, Nanda/Hobbs Contemporary, Sydney, Australia
- 2020 Anthony White at The Sidney Nolan Trust (online exhibition during COVID-19)
- 2019 Bloodlines and Borderlines, Young International Art Fair, Paris
- The Curious Eye Never Runs Dry, Informality Gallery, Henley, U.K.
- 2018 Signs of Civilisation, Nanda/Hobbs Contemporary
- 2016 Displacement (with Martin Brown) Le Pave D’Orsay, Paris
- Crossing the Rubicon, Nanda/Hobbs Contemporary
- When the Sleeper Wakes, Metro Gallery, Melbourne
- 2015 Pentimento, Metro Gallery, Melbourne
- 2014 Anthony White, Le Pave D’Orsay, Paris
- 2013 Informal Relations, The Cat Street Gallery, Hong Kong
- 2011 Scratching the Surface, Iain Dawson Gallery, Sydney
- 2010 Paris Paintings, Iain Dawson Gallery, Sydney
- 2008 Figure and Ground, Rushcutters Bay Gallery, Sydney
- 2007 Diverse Places, Marlene Antico Arts, Sydney

=== Residencies ===
- 2023 American Academy in Rome -CARBONI Project (on reserve)
- 2018 Artist in Residence, Nancy Fairfax Studio, The Tweed Regional Gallery & Margaret Olley Art Centre, Tweed Heads, NSW, Australia
- 2017 International Painting Symposium, The Mark Rothko Centre, Daugavpils, Latvia
- 2010 The Leipzig International Art Program Scholarship, Leipzig, Germany
- 2010 Artist in Residence, La Cité Internationale des Arts, Paris
- 2009 Artist in Residence, The Storrier Onslow National Art School Studio Residency
- 2008 Artist in Residence, The Vermont Studio Centre, Vermont, USA.
- 2007 Australia Council Skills and Arts Development: Artist in Residence, Paris, Moya Dyring Studio, La Cite Internationale Des Arts, Paris (on reserve)

== Collections and acquisitions ==
White was selected to participate in the 2017 International Painting Symposium at the Daugavpils Mark Rothko Art Centre, Latvia, in September 2017. Two works were acquired by the museum for the permanent collection. Of these, White said "The works made during the symposium are a direct reaction to my lived experience in Europe, and at a more nuanced level in dialogue with the place, the reflections on Rothko himself and his use of colour as a vehicle to consider deeper aspects of humanity. Of particular interest to me is the sense one gets from his works about the inherent relationship between his use of colour and notions of human rights. What drew me to the Centre was to research how Rothko gave equal importance to both painting as a physical endeavour, as well as a philosophical enquiry."

As well as his work being held in numerous private collections, White's portrait Mandrake - Portrait of Baz Luhrmann (charcoal on paper) was acquired in 2014 for the Australian Portrait Collection of the Tweed Regional Gallery and Margaret Olley Centre. This work was also a Finalist in the Kedumba Drawing Award 2014

In 2018, Elle Decor Magazine mentioned an abstract painting by Anthony White hanging in the home of Baz Luhrmann and Catherine Martin.

=== Public and museum collections ===
- The Australian Portrait Collection, Tweed Regional Gallery & Margaret Olley Art Centre, Tweed Heads, NSW, Australia
- Soho House Permanent Collection, London, UK
- The Mark Rothko Centre Permanent Collection, Daugavpils, Latvia

== Key works ==
=== Mobilising Material ===
In 2019, White presented a series of works at the Mark Rothko Art Centre in Latvia, including artworks from a previous exhibition The Curious Eye Never Runs Dry at UK gallery Informality in the same year, including:

- Docile Bodies, which utilised collage and mixed media to explore the concept of punishment in response to the opening chapter of Foucault's book “Discipline and Punish” (1977).
- Vedova, using techniques referencing Venetian mid-century avant-garde artist and figure of the Italian resistance movement Emilio Vedova who said that abstract art is political regardless of subject matter.
- L’effondrement, featuring several collage works using found-material from the streets of Paris and reflecting White's research on the collapsology theory from climate change experts Pablo Servigne and Raphaëlle Stevens. The Rothko Centre noted:

“Drawing from the urban cultural history of Paris, the artist uses these metro posters or “affiches” to build the image with tearing, re-cropping and utilising painterly interventions acting as a form of dissent and to dwell on modes of community and collectivity.”

=== The Landscape is never Innocent - (After Mannalargenna) ===
White's recent work The Landscape is never Innocent - (After Mannalargenna) (oil on linen, 150.5 cm x 121 cm) was Highly Commended in the 2018 Glover Prize for Landscape Painting. The Curator of the Glover Prize, Megan Dick, wrote, "Anthony White's painting The Landscape is Never Innocent After Mannalargenna re-examines a contested history in early Tasmanian settlement using bold red and black gestures to reflect upon and portray the confrontations between Aboriginal Tasmanians and Early European settlers." While the artist is quoted the background to the work as, "To me, there is a painfully clear disparity between the written history of Aboriginal Australia and actual events. Looking back at Australia from my adopted home in Europe it is clear to me that no meaningful reconciliation has taken place. As a nation Australia must adjust the record and make reparations towards its First Nations People."

=== Cape Tribulation I ===
White's work Cape Tribulation I was selected as one of the Finalists in the 2017 Paddington Art Prize. The description of the work on the Prize website states, "This work dwells upon personal memory and history of Cape Tribulation and consequences for Indigenous Australians. Cook mentioned that 'here began all our troubles' and marks the first squeegee group based paintings executed using ripolin paints."

== Recognitions and awards ==
White's work Federation Peak was one of 42 finalists in the 2021 Glover Prize which received 640 entrants representing the, “best artworks of the Tasmanian landscape.” The Glover Prize catalogue included White's reflections:

“Tasmania is under threat from ecological disaster. During 2019 at the base of Federation Peak fires were at the edge of the surrounding alpine forests. In a devastatingly short amount of time ecological threat has gone from fantasy to a reality. The fires of 2019 signifies a new age of climate catastrophe, one in which we need urgent action to slow down the immediate effects of an increase in sea temperatures, heatwaves and extreme rainfall events. The southwest of the island the vastly uninhabited area, a world heritage site, is beginning to die as documented in various media reports most notably from the Guardian article dated February 2019 water scientist -Professor Peter Davies quoted as saying -“the island's vast, uninhabited and globally unique wildland, the heart of its world heritage area – was dying. The iconic habitats of rainforest, button grass plains, and heathlands had begun to vanish because of climate change.”

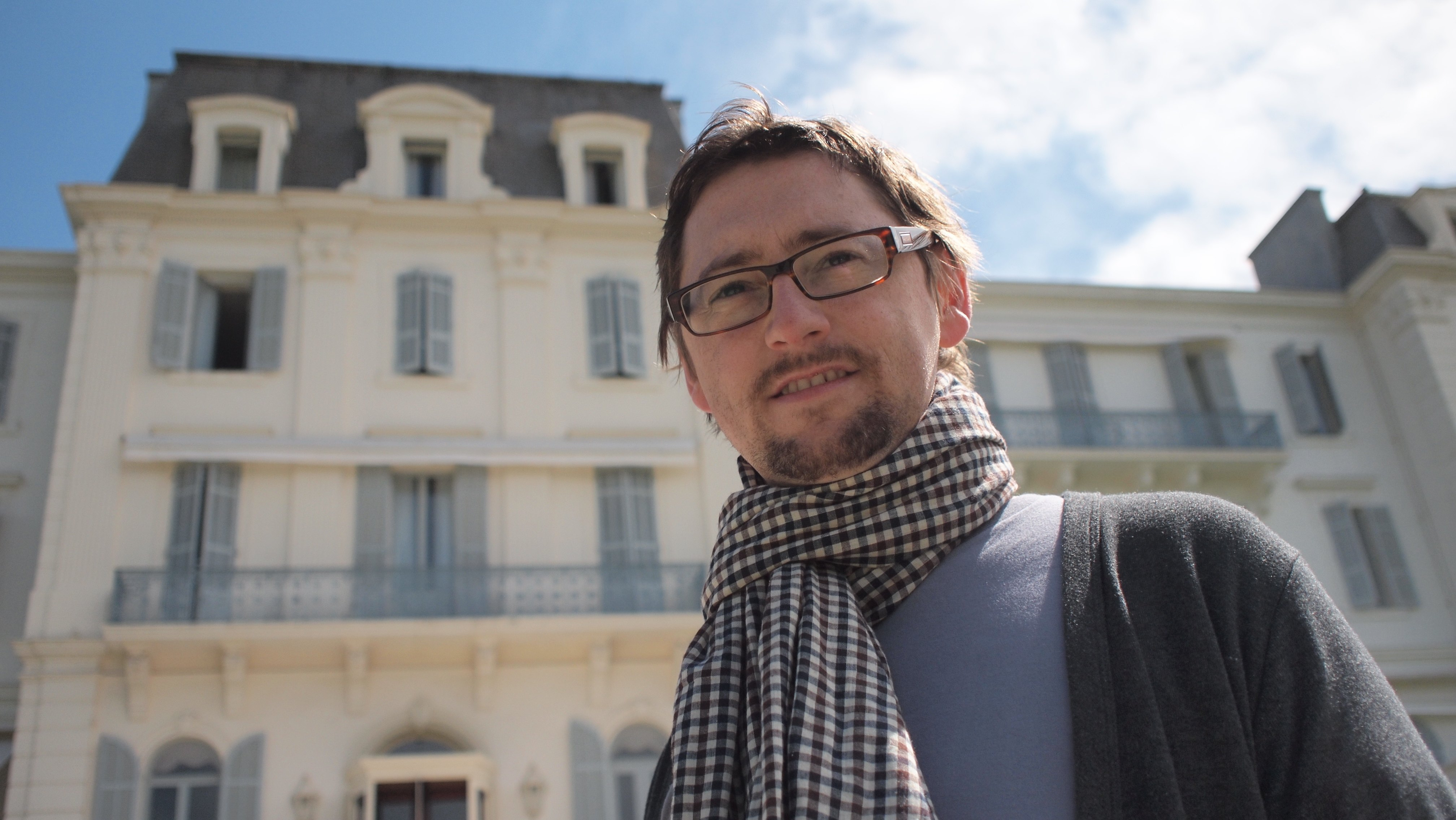
Anthony White, biography photo, Marten Bequest (2008)

=== Notable accolades ===
- 2023 La Bourse de ADAGP - Dotation Fonds d'œuvres et d’archives (Endowment for Works and Archives Fund by the Authors Society for graphic and plastic arts)
- 2022 STOCKADE, The National Library of Australia Creative Fellowship
- 2021 Glover Prize for Landscape Painting, Tasmania Australia
- 2018 The Nancy Fairfax Studio Residency, Tweed Heads Regional Gallery and Margaret Olley Art Centre
- 2018 Highly Commended, Glover Prize for Landscape Painting, The John Glover Society, Evandale, Tasmania. |
- 2017 Rothko International Symposium participant, Daugavpils Mark Rothko Art Center, Daugavpils, Latvia
- 2017, 2016, 2005 Paddington Art Prize finalist
- 2015 Lithograph project with Michael Woolworth Publications, Paris funded by The Creative Industries Career Fund, Copyright Agency, Australia
- 2010 Award at La Cité Internationale des Arts, Paris (Awarded by William Wright AM)
- 2014 Invited finalist, Kedumba Drawing Prize
- 2010 Leipzig International Art Program
- 2009 Artist in Residence at The Storrier Onslow National Art School Studio Residency Award at the Cité internationale des arts in Paris (awarded by William Wright AM)
- 2007 Recipient of the Marten Bequest for Painting
- 2007 The Churchie Emerging Artist Prize Finalists Exhibition, Brisbane
- 2006 The Brett Whiteley Travelling Art Scholarship Finalist, Sydney
- 2005 The Churchie Emerging Artist Prize Finalist Exhibition, Brisbane (Commended)
- 2005 Recipient of The Elioth Gruner Prize for Landscape Painting, The Art Gallery of New South Wales
- 2002 The Lloyd Rees Memorial Youth Art Award (Highly Commended by Nicholas Harding)

== Selected publications ==
- "Anthony White: Mobilising Material," Anthony White with an introduction by Rob Maconachie, 2022.
- "5x5 Exhibition London". Catalog Essay by Ashley Crawford. 27 May 2010.
- "Inverting The Panopticon". Catalog Essay by Robert Maconachie. London, 2019.
- "Henley Life Magazine". Robert Maconachie. 4 October 2019.
- "On Challenging Mud: Anthony White's, Crossing The Rubicon". Catalog Essay by Robert Maconachie. Sydney, 1 September 2016.
- "Apocalypse Now". In As The Sleeper Wakes, Exhibition Catalog by Ashley Crawford. 1 May 2016.
- "Strictly Townhouse". Vanessa Lawrence. Elle Decor Magazine US Edition, September 2018, p. 136-142.
