= Zitko =

Zitko is a surname. Notable people with the surname include:

- Matic Žitko (born 1990), Slovenian footballer
- Otto Zitko (born 1959), Austrian artist
- Radim Žitko (born 1978), Czech tennis player
