= Centre national des arts plastiques =

Museum in France

- Location within France
- Established: 1982
- Location: Cap 18, 189 rue d'Aubervilliers, Paris, France
- Coordinates: 48.5351°N 2.149°E
- Type: Cultural institution
- Website: www.cnap.fr

The Centre national des arts plastiques (National Centre for Visual Arts, or CNAP) is a French institution established in 1982 under the Ministry of Culture and Communication that promotes creation of visual arts. It provides assistance to artists and galleries, and manages the Fonds national d'art contemporain (FNAC; National Foundation for Contemporary Art).

== Background ==
The CNAP has its origins in the Division des Beaux-Arts (Fine Arts Division) created in 1791 just after the French Revolution with its own budget to encourage living artists and educate citizens. This was succeeded in turn by the Bureau des Beaux-Arts in 1800, Bureau de l'encouragement des Arts in 1879, the Bureau des Travaux d'art in 1882 and finally the Centre national des arts plastiques (CNAP) in 1982. Throughout this history the goal was to encourage creation of contemporary work. CNAP was created by a prime ministerial decree of 15 October 1982, under the Minister of Culture.

== Activities ==
The purpose of CNAP was defined as support and promotion of artistic creation in different forms including photography, graphic arts, design and crafts. The CNAP acquires and commissions works of art, and disseminates them, contributes to modern application of ancient crafts, and to application of new technologies and materials, supports visual artists and provides education to the public and to artists. CNAP provides various types of assistance to artists resident in France. Research grants are given to artists to fund research or development of an artistic project. Assistance may be given for creation of an audiovisual or multimedia work. Galleries may be funded for the first solo exhibition of an artist, or for production of the first catalog of an artist's work in a gallery. A writer, theoretician or art critic may be given support for research.

== Collection ==
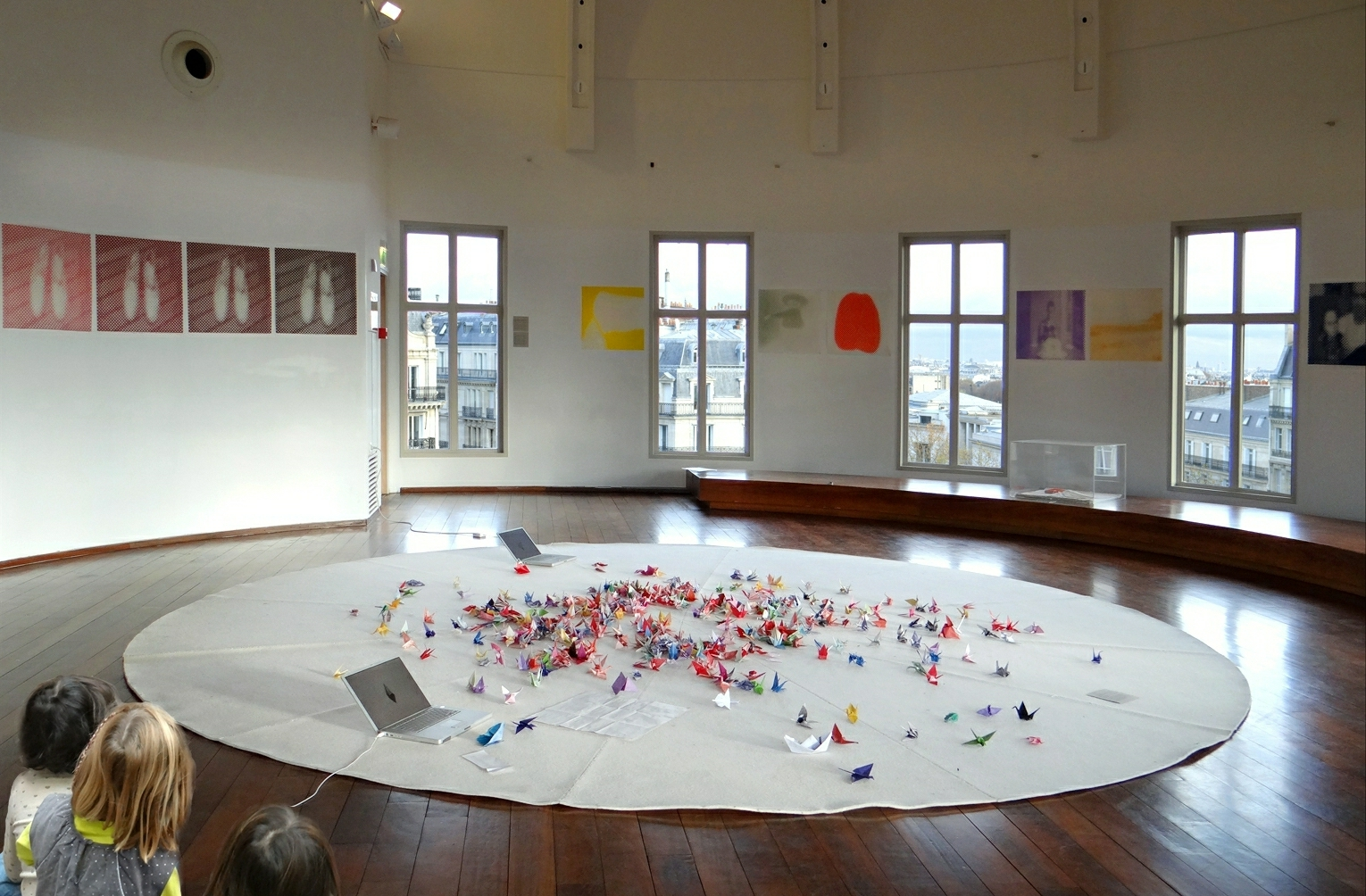
Work from CNAP in the center of the rotunda of the Musée Guimet in 2012. Participatory work on the floor by Marie-Ange Guilleminot (1999), swatches on the wall by Michael Woolworth (2003).

CNAP was given responsibility for managing the Fonds national d'art contemporain (FNAC; National Foundation for Contemporary Art). As of 2014 the foundation, dating back to the French Revolution, had 95,000 works. Many of these are displayed in museums, public places and government buildings. The Centre Georges Pompidou opened in 1977, now housing the Musée National d'Art Moderne (National Museum of Modern Art), and many modern works were transferred to it from the FNAC, which now focuses on contemporary art.

The foundation has three main collections: the historical collection, the modern collection and the contemporary collection. The historical collection includes over 21,000 works from the late 18th to early 20th centuries, predominantly by French artists. There are 13,000 paintings, 5,500 sculptures and 2,000 graphics arts objects. Almost half of these works were commissioned, and many are official portraits of various heads of state and sovereigns. Many of the works have been deposited with regional museums, churches and public buildings such as city halls, hospitals and schools. The modern collection covers the period from the early 20th century to the start of the 1960s, and includes almost 34,000 works by more than 9,000 artists. The number of commissioned works, or works bought from the Salon is much lower than in the 19th century. There are representative works from the different movements of the 1920s and 1930s, and also works from the renewal of religious art with the Chantiers du cardinal. The modern collection also shows greater openness to foreign artists working in Paris, including Latin American, Arab-Muslim and Asian artists.

The contemporary collection covers the period from the 1960s to the present, with more than 48,700 works as of 2014. 40,000 of these have been added to the collection since 1980. It is divided into Visual Arts, Photography, Audiovisual – Video – New Media, Decorative Arts and Design. The collection has grown through acquisitions, donations and commissions, and attempts to be fully representative regardless of gender, age or region of origin, covering the diverse contemporary artistic trends and creative practices.

== Sources ==
- "Centre National des Arts Plastiques (CNAP)" (in French). Ministry of Culture and Communications.
- "Décret n°82-883 du 15 octobre 1982 portant création du Centre national des arts plastiques" (in French).
- "Une collection en mouvement" (PDF) (in French). CNAP.
