= Peter Soriano =

French-American artist

- Born: 1959 (age 66–67); Manila, Philippines
- Education: Harvard College
- Website: petersoriano.com

Peter Soriano (born 1959) is a Franco-American contemporary artist and sculptor. His works are included in numerous public collections, including the Museum of Fine Arts, Boston, the Metropolitan Museum of Art and the Morgan Library & Museum in New York, the Harvard Art Museums in Massachusetts, the Yale University Art Gallery in New Haven, the Portland Museum of Art in Maine, and the Fonds national d'art contemporain (FNAC) and Fondation Cartier pour l'Art Contemporain in Paris.

== Life ==
Soriano was born in 1959 in Manila, in the Philippines, where his grandfather Andrés Soriano was a prominent industrialist and war hero. He moved to the United States in the 1970s. After earning a BA in the history of art from Harvard College in 1981, Soriano studied at the Skowhegan School of Painting and Sculpture before launching his career as a sculptor in New York City. He has said that he learned painting from his uncle Fernando Zóbel de Ayala y Montojo. He now lives between Penobscot, Maine, and Paris, France, with his wife Nina Munk.

== Work ==
Soriano began his career making large biomorphic sculptures in polyester resin. While his earliest works seemed light-hearted and reminiscent of children's toys, his later sculptures became more “vexing,” to cite a critic, suggestive of industrial tools with an indeterminate purpose.

In the mid-2000s, during a six-month residency at the Atelier Calder in Saché, in Indre-et-Loire in France, he started making wall installations using aluminium tubing, steel cable, and spray paint. The critic Raphael Rubinstein, an editor at Art in America, mentioned these works as examples of what he calls "provisional painting," a style of art intentionally made to appear "casual, dashed-off, tentative, unfinished or self-cancelling."

Beginning in 2012, Soriano's work became dominated by large-scale, wall drawings made of graphite, acrylic and spray paint, carried out on the basis of written instructions, as well as related drawings made on pleated Japanese paper. “Simply put, Soriano has become a sculptor who doesn’t make objects,” wrote John Yau.

More recently, according to a museum press release, Soriano has been working on a long-term project that "documents the rapidly changing natural environment of the High North, specifically snow, glaciers, and icebergs." In 2022 and 2023, one work in this project, a 28-foot-long wall drawing titled Ilulissat, Disko Bugt, a reference to the location in Greenland where the artist used "an almost scientific process of observation and documentation" to capture to impermanence of icebergs, was installed and exhibited at the Portland Museum of Art in Maine, the Reykjavik Art Museum in Iceland, and the Bildmuseet in Sweden.

In collaboration with the master printer Michael Woolworth, Soriano is working on a limited edition artist book of lithographs.

== Selected exhibitions ==
- Running Fix, Fonds régional d’art contemperain Auvergne, Clermont-Ferrand, France, February 2007
- Other Side -> (NUM)BERS <- And What Follows, Château de Kerguéhennec, Brittany, France, September 2011
- Bagaduce ->( )<- East 19th, Center for Maine Contemporary Art, Rockport, ME, May 2013
- Permanent Maintenance, Colby College Museum of Art, Waterville, ME, September 2015
- Cresta, CIRCUIT Centre d'art contemporain, Lausanne, Switzerland, September 2017
- INAGDV, L’art dans les chapelles, Le Sourn, France, July 2018
- Down Иorth: North Atlantic Triennial, Portland Museum of Art, Portland, ME, February 2022; Reykjavik Art Museum, Reykjavik, Iceland, October 2022; Bildmuseet, Umeå, Sweden, May 2023
- Hokusai: Inspiration and Influence, Museum of Fine Arts, Boston, March 26-July 16, 2023
