= Daugavpils fortress =

Castle in Latvia

Coordinates: 55°53′11″N 26°29′42″E

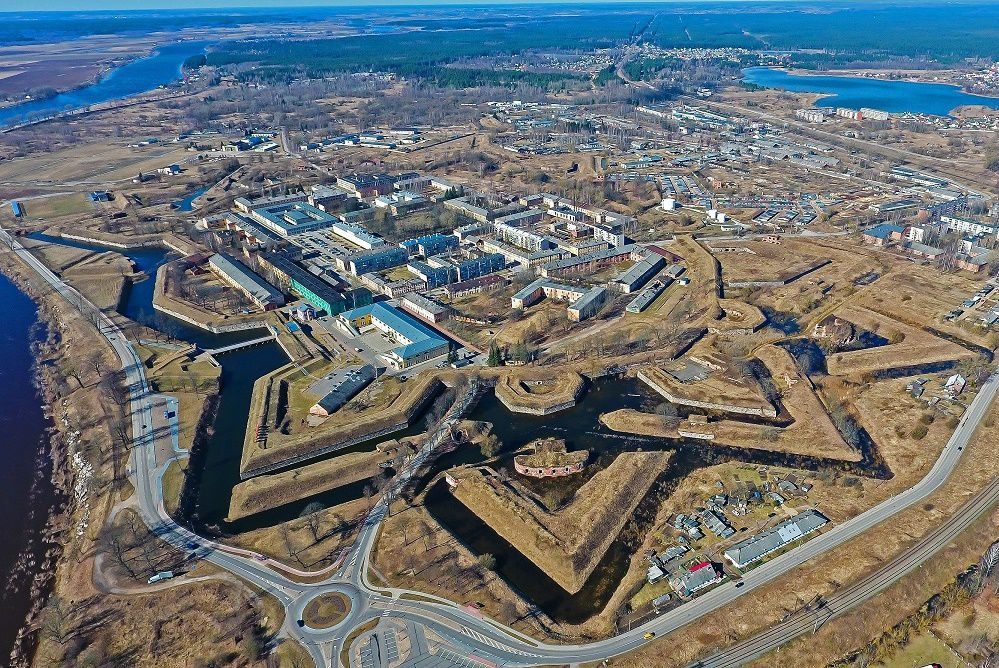
Daugavpils Fortress

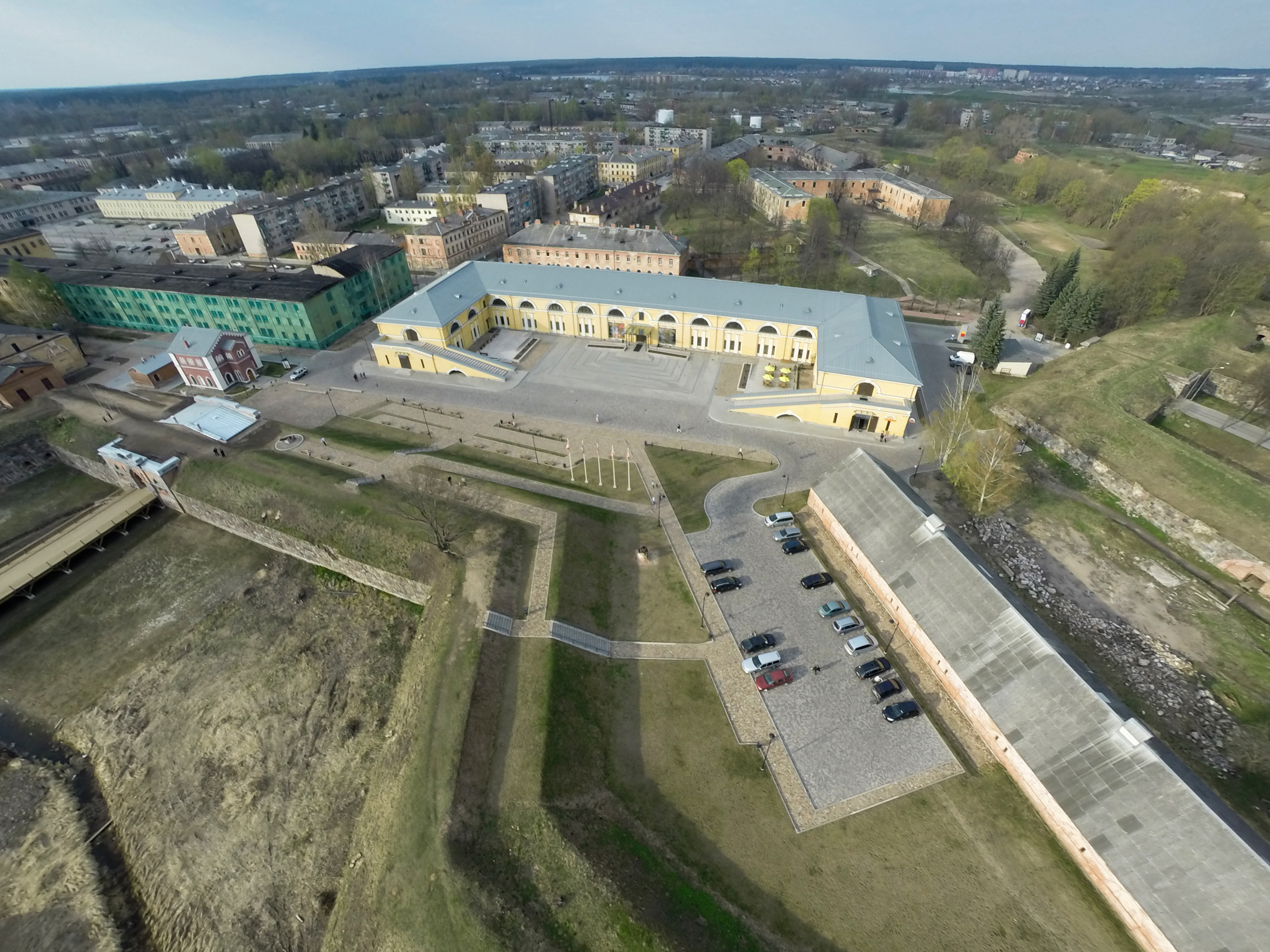
Mark Rothko Art Centre

Daugavpils Fortress, also known as Dinaburg Fortress or Dvinsk Fortress, and in Latvian known as "Daugavpils Cietoksnis" is an early 19th century fortress in Daugavpils, Latvia. It is the only early 19th century military fortification of its kind in Northern Europe that has been preserved without significant alterations. The construction of the fortress began in 1810 by decree of Tsar Alexander I of Russia, in the atmosphere of increased tension before Napoleon's invasion of the Russian Empire in 1812. Construction of the fortress, due to Napoleon's invasion, lengthy delays, serious floodings and slow construction work, was fully completed only in 1878.

The Mark Rothko Art centre is located in the former Artillery arsenal.

== History ==
About 10,000 workers built the fortress in two shifts. In 1812, the fortress was attacked by a detachment of the French Army of 24,000 men. The fortress was still under construction and was defended by 3300 men with 200 cannons. The fortress was a significant modern military centre of the Russian Empire, for a long time being a defense base of the western frontier of the Russian Empire. The direct route taken by Russian nobles and Royalty from St. Petersburg (then capital of the Russian Empire) to Europe led right through the city of Daugavpils (then named Dinaburg), and Daugavpils Fortress was the place of rest for many nobles including tsars Alexander I, Nicolas I, Alexander II, Alexander III and Russia's last tsar Nicolas II.

Latvian independence was officially recognised by Soviet Russia in 1920, and between 1920 and 1940 the fortress became home of the Latvian army. During World War II, the camp for Soviet prisoners of war Stalag 340 was set up by German army in the fortress. The fortress' Baroque Jesuit church constructed from 1737 to 1746 was destroyed during the War.

In 1948–1993, the fortress was home to the Daugavpils Higher School of Military Aircraft Engineering (DVVAIU). In 1998 the fortress came under the authority of the State Real Estate Agency of Latvia. In 2004 the Cabinet of Ministers of the Republic of Latvia decided to sell the fortress either in parts or as one whole. The fortress's future remains uncertain.

== Former Jesuit Church ==
The Daugavpils Jesuit Church was built in the 1670s on the site of the today's fortress. The first, small wooden (or wood and masonry) church was replaced ca. 1730-1746 by the large, Baroque masonry church. In the 19th century it was turned into Orthodox church and in the interwar period it served as a Lutheran garrison church. In 1944 it was destroyed and the ruins were completely demolished in the 1950s.

== Gallery ==
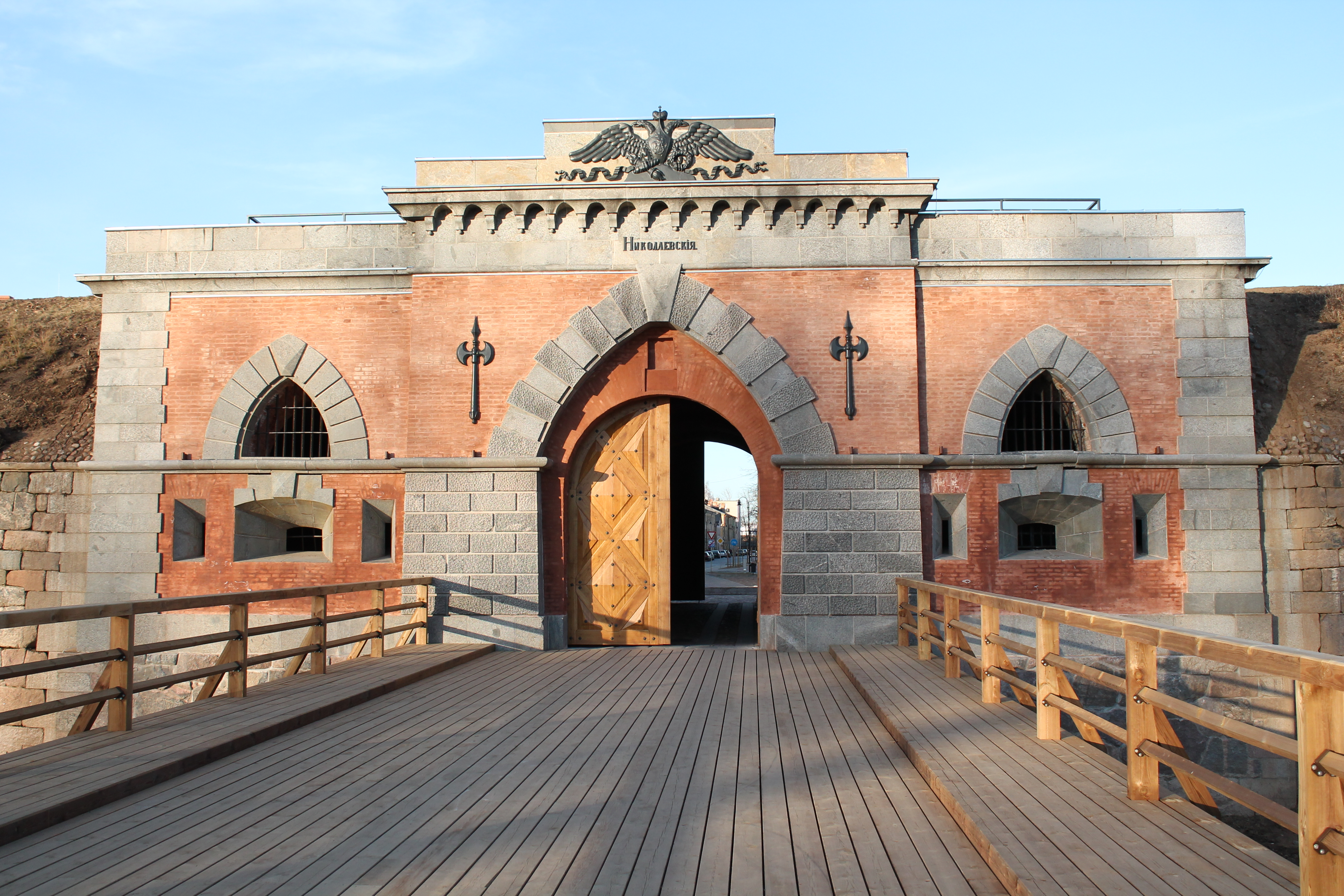
Nicholas Gate

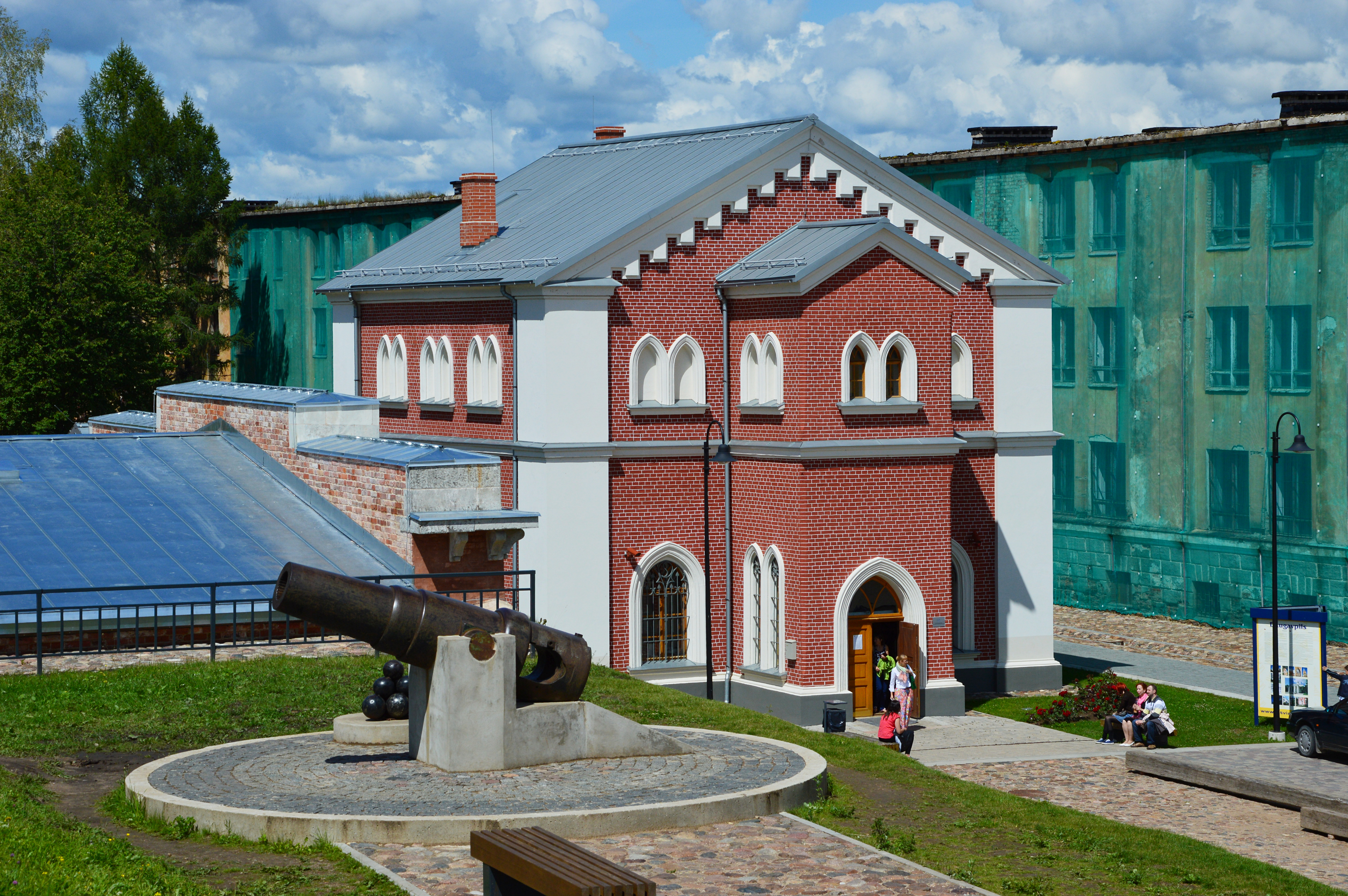
Pump House

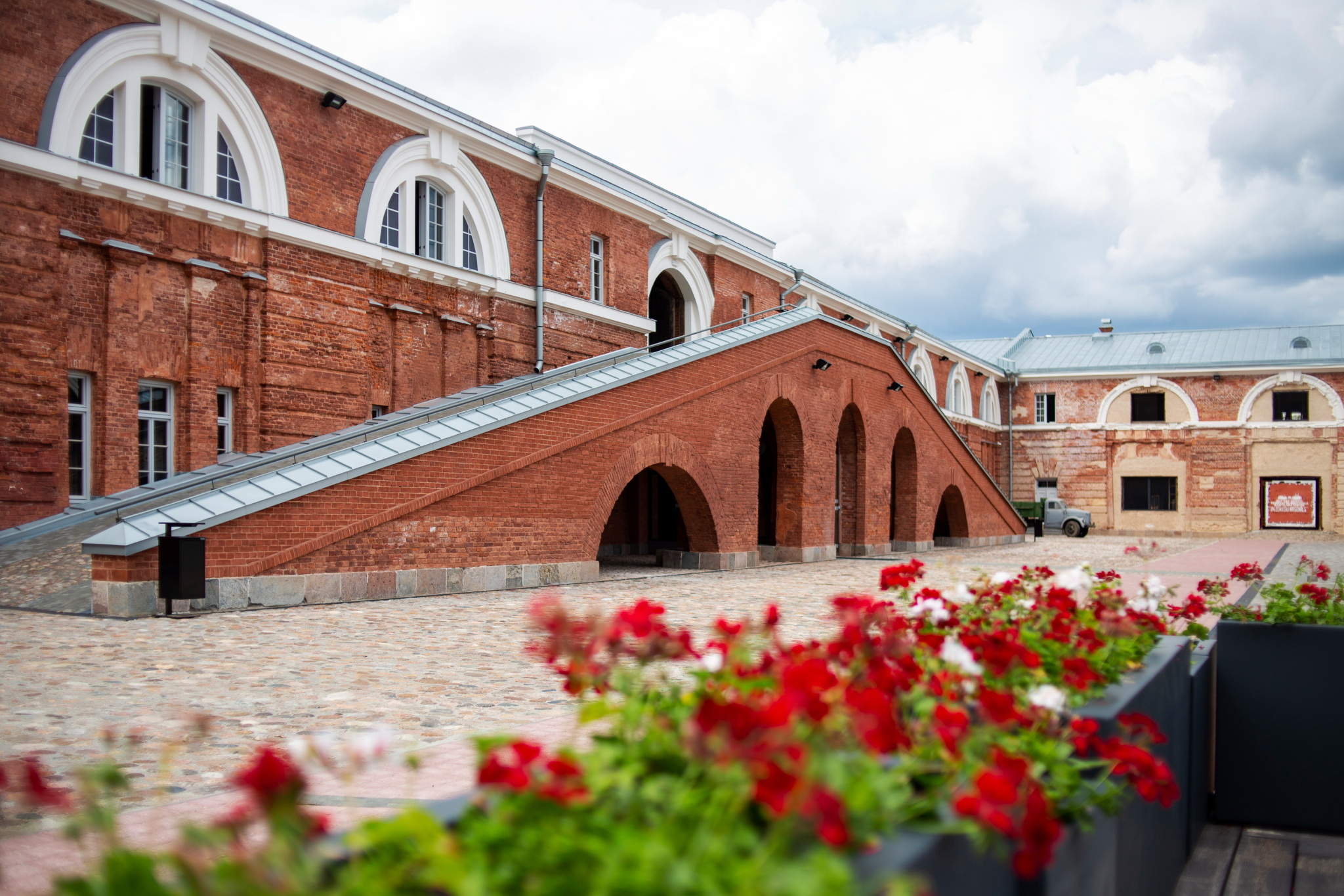
The courtyard of the Engineering arsenal

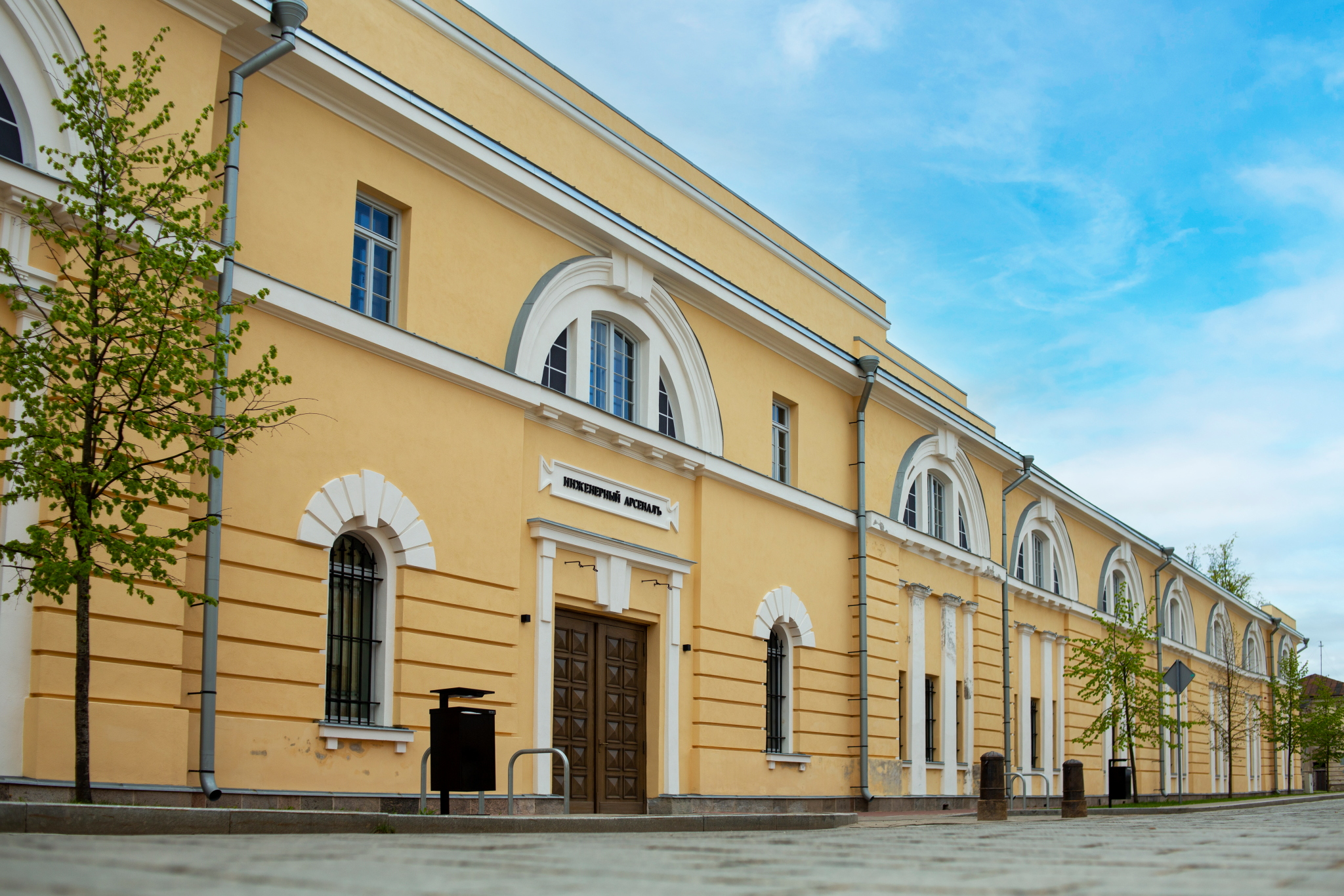
The exterior facade of the Engineering Arsenal from the side of Imperatora Street

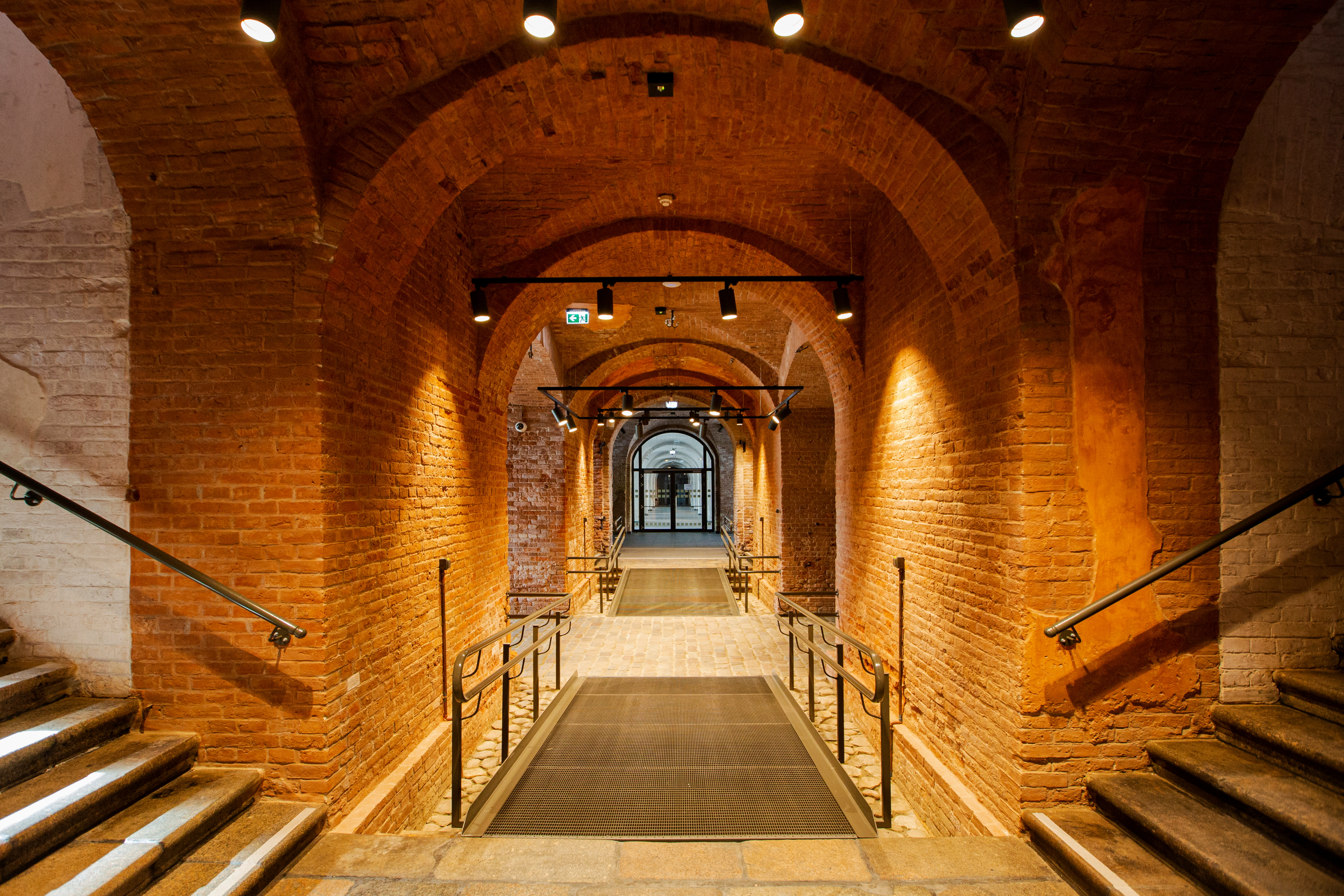
The interior of the Engineering Arsenal after the restoration

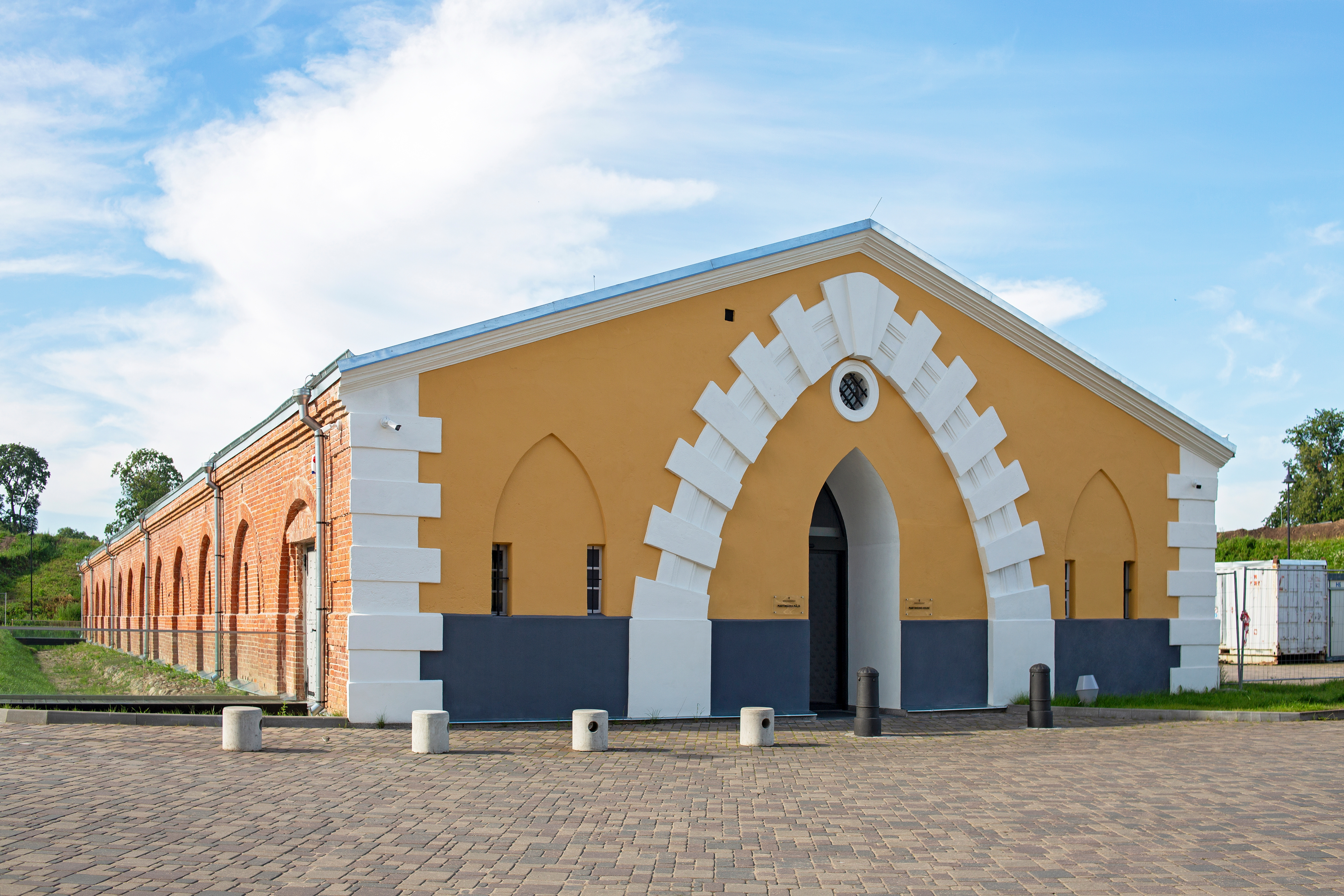
The main facade of the Gunpowder warehouse

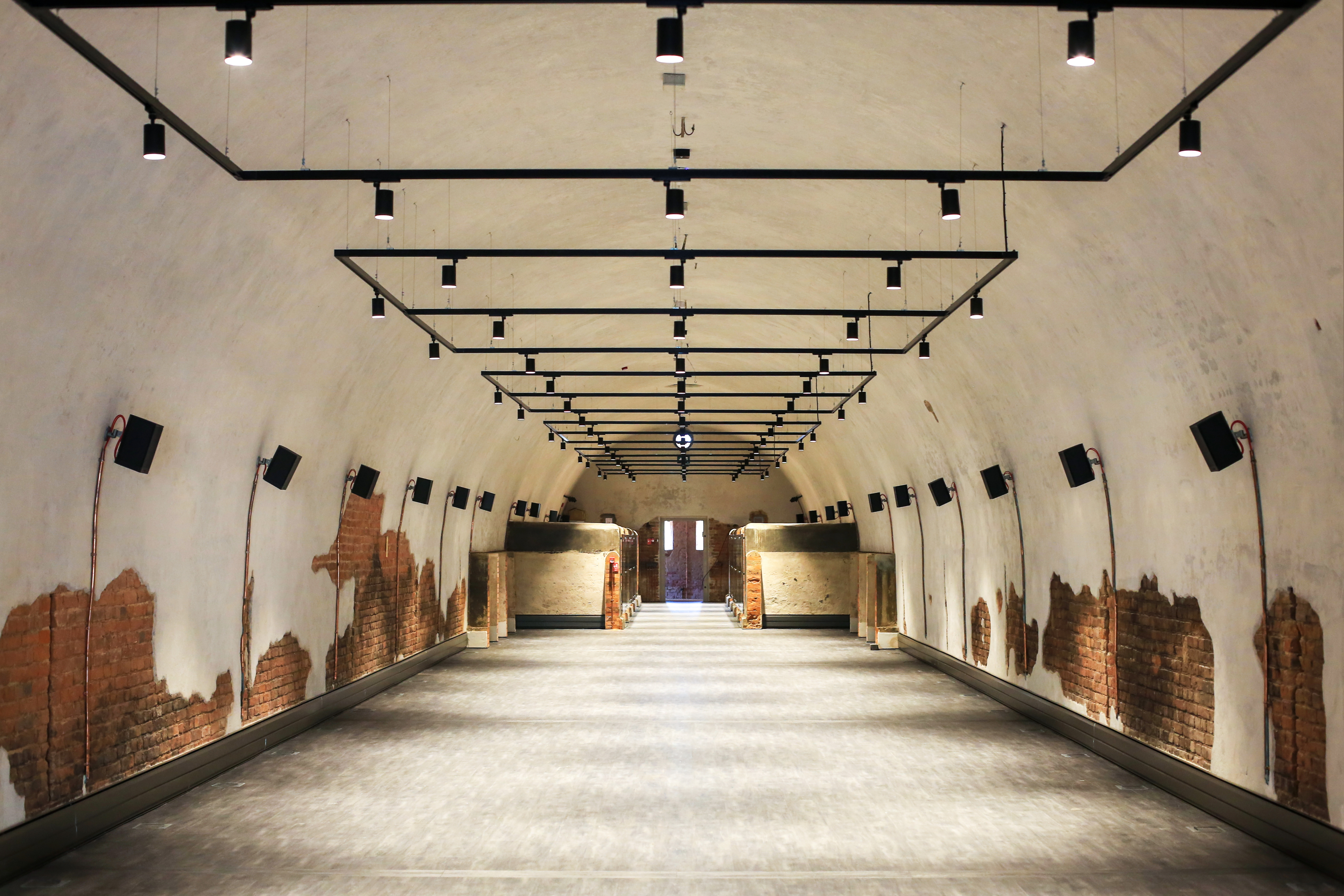
The interior of the Gunpowder warehouse

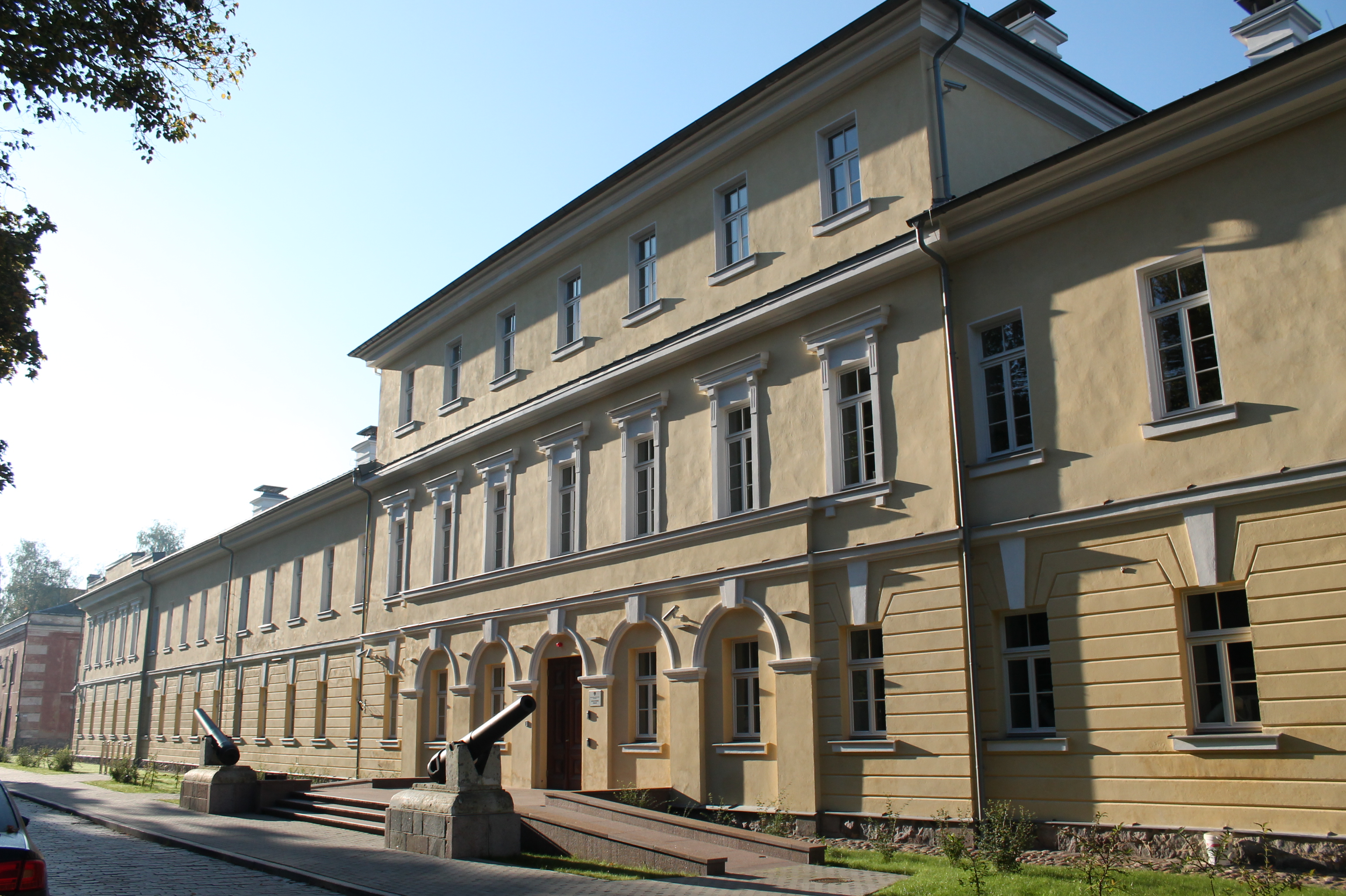
Commandant's House

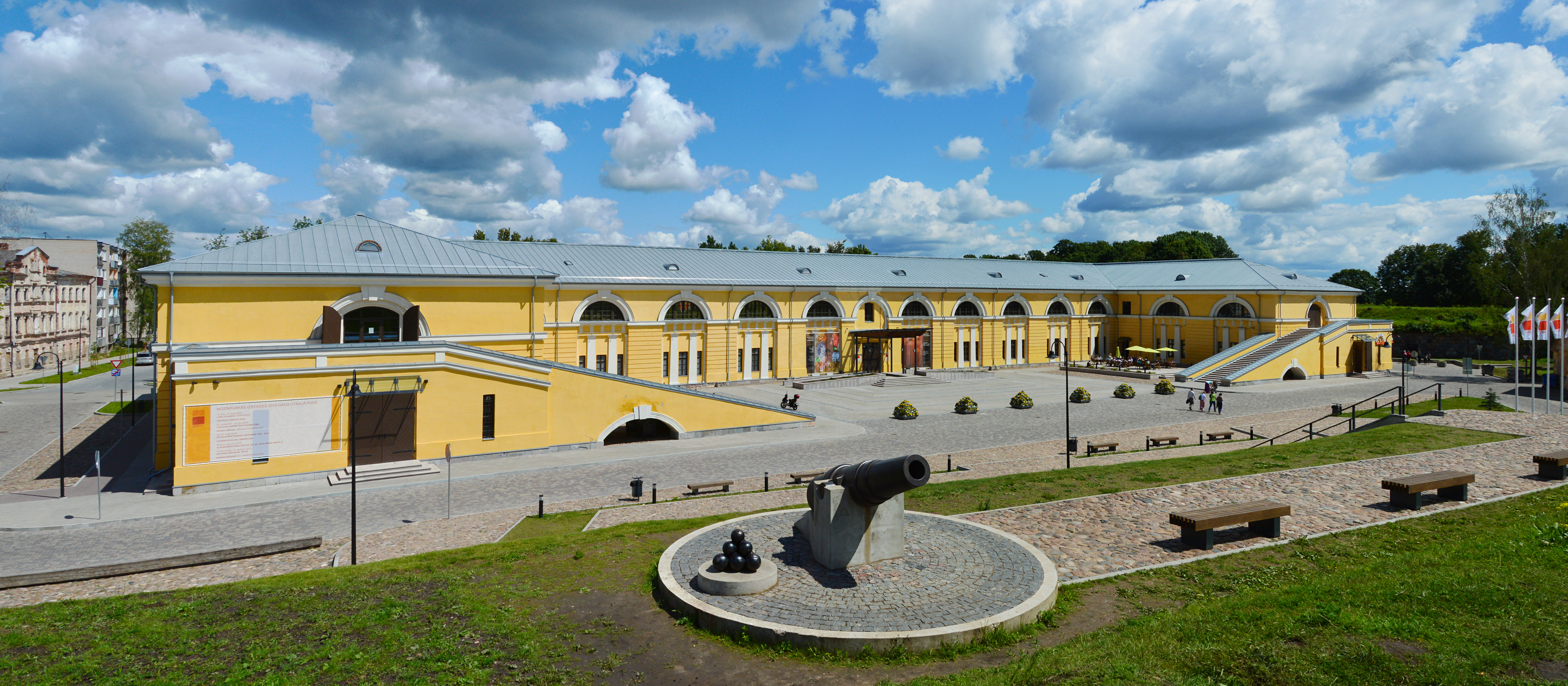
Artillery arsenal

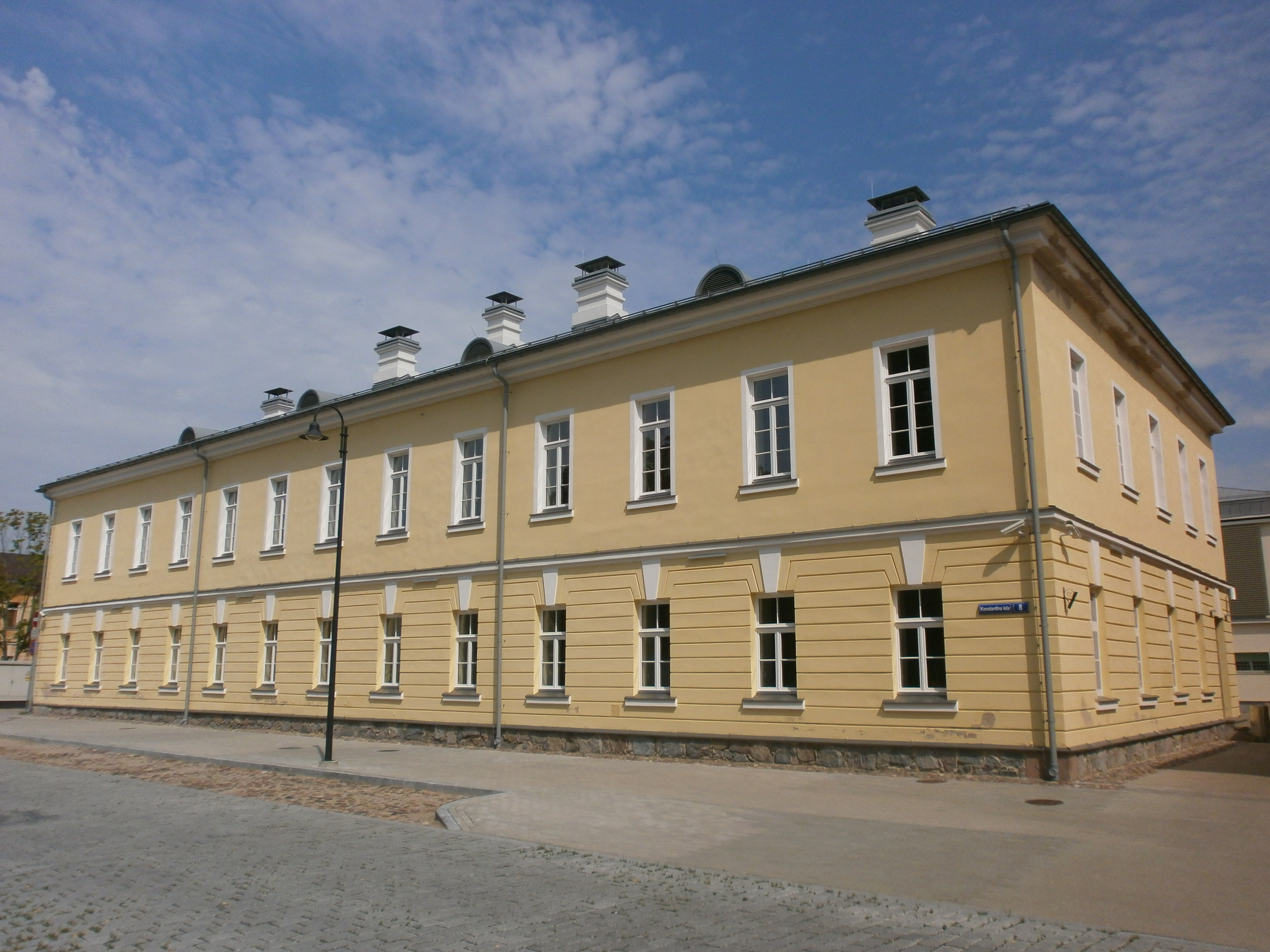
Officer's House

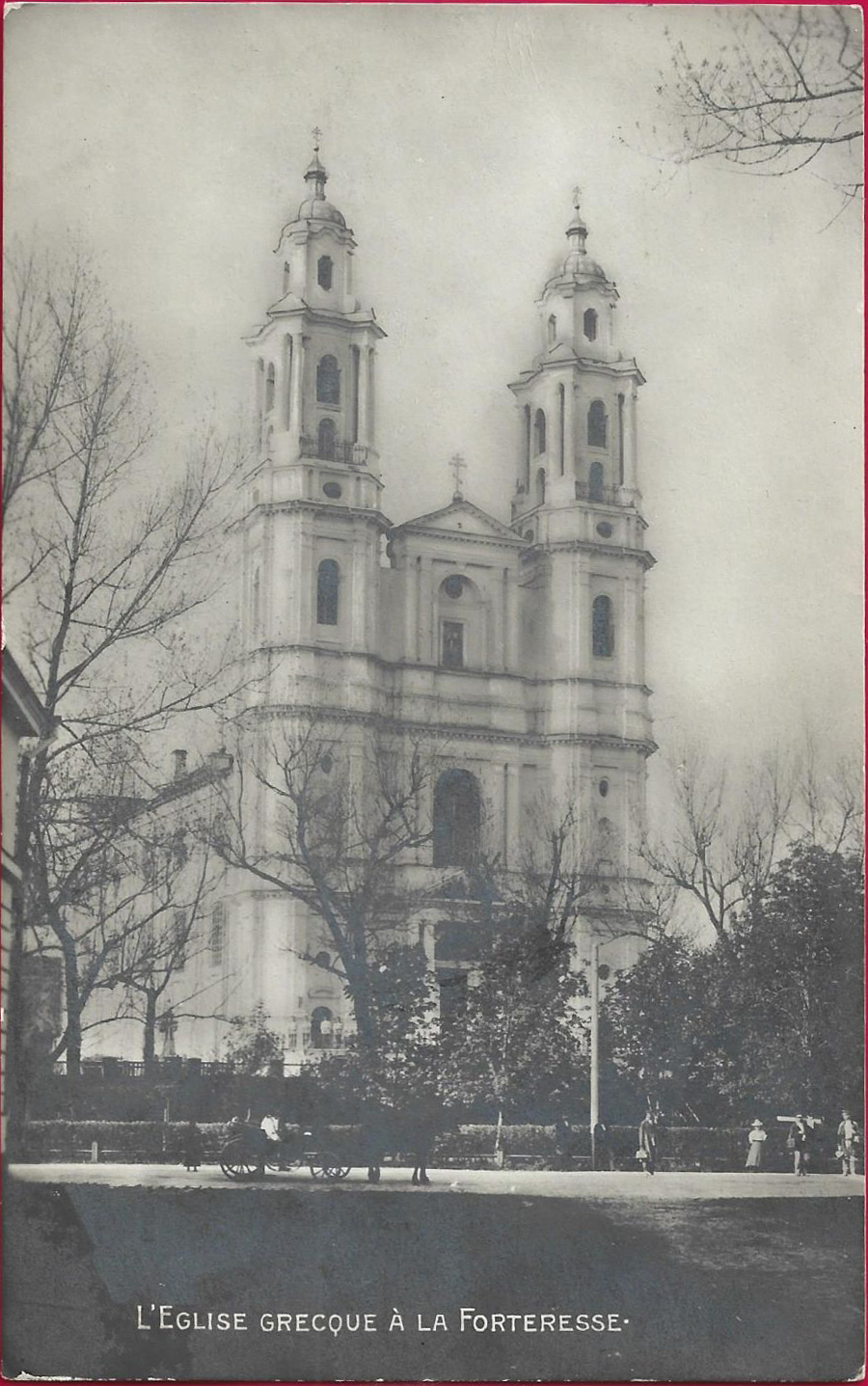
Former Jesuit Church

== See also ==
- List of Jesuit sites
