= William MacKendree =

American artist

William MacKendree

William MacKendree is an American artist. He was born in Augusta, Georgia in 1948. He studied Philosophy and Visual Arts at Georgia State University in Atlanta. Following the completion of his university degrees, he left the U.S. to live and work in Greece between 1975 and 1982.

== Biography ==
His time in Greece was shared between Thessaloniki and the island of Paros. There were many trips of discovery throughout Greece and the Balkan Peninsula, as well as Turkey, North Africa, and the Mediterranean world. The encounters with Archaic Greek sculpture and Minoan Painting left deep impressions, above all for their provocative simplicity and essence of line. The potential for the figurative within the context of the dominant minimalist visual culture of contemporary art may well have germinated from the initial visual shocks of this imagery. Here was an art that embodied both graphic dynamism and the impulse to vital forms and themes. His six years in Greece provided a relatively isolated cocoon for research and experimental trial-and-error; moving steadily closer to a way to flesh out his first personal, near-archaic, works.

It was soon after his arrival in Paris that he made the group of paintings that constituted his first gallery exhibition, in 1984. In the aftermath there appeared articles on these works in art magazines such as ‘Eighty’, Opus International, Flash Art, and Art in America. He was invited to participate in the international survey of contemporary art ‘Anniottanta’ at the Museum of Modern art of Bologna in 1985. That same year, he received the Prix de Peinture at the Salon International d’Art Contemporain in Montrouge, and his work was acquired by the Musée Nationale d’Art Moderne et Contemporaine, the Centre Pompidou, in Paris.

Exhibitions in Vienna, Innsbruck, and Rome were held in 1986, and he also began a long-running collaboration with Michael Woolworth publications, creating numerous prints and artist’s books in the intervening years. Other collaborations and commissions have subsequently become an integral facet of his visual production. Mural projects were realized for the Reims Urban Transport headquarters (1998), for the City of Paris (2000), La Grande Arche de la Défense (1991), as well as for private companies in France.

The Centre Regional d’Art Contemporain of Toulouse presented the first large institutional survey of his work in 1990. Since then there have followed regular intervals of exhibitions in galleries throughout Europe.

== Exhibitions ==
Solo exhibitions 2012
Galerie Vidal-Saint Phalle, Paris
Galerie Storrer, Zurich
Galerie La Navire, Brest

2011
Galerie Placido, Paris

2009
Galerie La Navire, Brest

2007
Galerie Erich Storrer, Zurich

2005
Galerie La Navire, Brest
Le Quartz, Brest

2004
Galerie Vidal-St.Phalle, Paris
Galerie La Navire, Brest

2002
Art Koln, Galerie Vidal-St. Phalle, Paris

2001
Galerie Vidal-St. Phalle, Paris

2000
Galerie Nanky De Vreeze, Amsterdam
F.I.A.C., Michael Woolworth Publications

=== Group exhibitions ===
2012
'Ressources Humaines', Les Abattoirs, Musée d'Art Contemporain, Toulouse
'Louyétu', Maison des Arts, Centre d'Art Contemporain, Carjac

2011
‘Drawing Now’, Salon du Dessin Contemporain; Carrousel du Louvre, Paris
Galeries Vidal-St. Phalle, La Navire, Placido
‘Woolworth Publications’, Nomad Gallery, Brussels

2010
‘Vingt Ans Apres’, Galerie Vidal-St. Phalle, Paris
‘Art en Edition’, l’Espace Topographie de l’Art, Paris

2009
‘Que du Papier’, Galerie Placido, Paris

2007
‘Sweet Powder’, Aître Saint Maclou, Ecole Regionale des Beaux Arts, Rouen

2006
‘Quinze Ans, Quinze Artistes’, Galerie Vidal-St. Phalle, Paris

2005
‘Print it, Damn it’, Museo del Grabado, Fuendetodos

2003
‘Jazz’, Université de Brest, Brest

2001
’10 Ans Aprês’, Galerie Vidal-St.-Phalle, Paris

1999
‘Jeux de Genres’, Espace Electra, Paris

== Public collections ==
- La Grande Arche de la Défense, Paris
- Fonds National d’Art Contemporain, Ministère de la Culture, France
- La Ville de Paris
- Neue Galerie der Stadt, Linz
- Musée d’Art Moderne et Contemporain, Toulouse
- Musée National d’Art Moderne, Paris
- Transports Urbain de Reims
- Leepa-Rattner Museum of Art, Tarpon Springs, Florida

== Public commissions ==
2006–2008
Mural Installations, Verlingue Courtiers en Assurance, Quimper

2000
Wall Mural, City of Paris, rue des Dames

1998
Mural Installation, Transport Urbain de Reims Headquarters

== Awards and grants ==
- Prix de Peinture, Salon International de Montrouge, 1985
- Pollock-Krasner Foundation, New York, 1996
