= Mark Rothko Art Centre =

Institution in Daugavpils, Latvia

Coordinates: 55°53′02″N 26°29′51″E

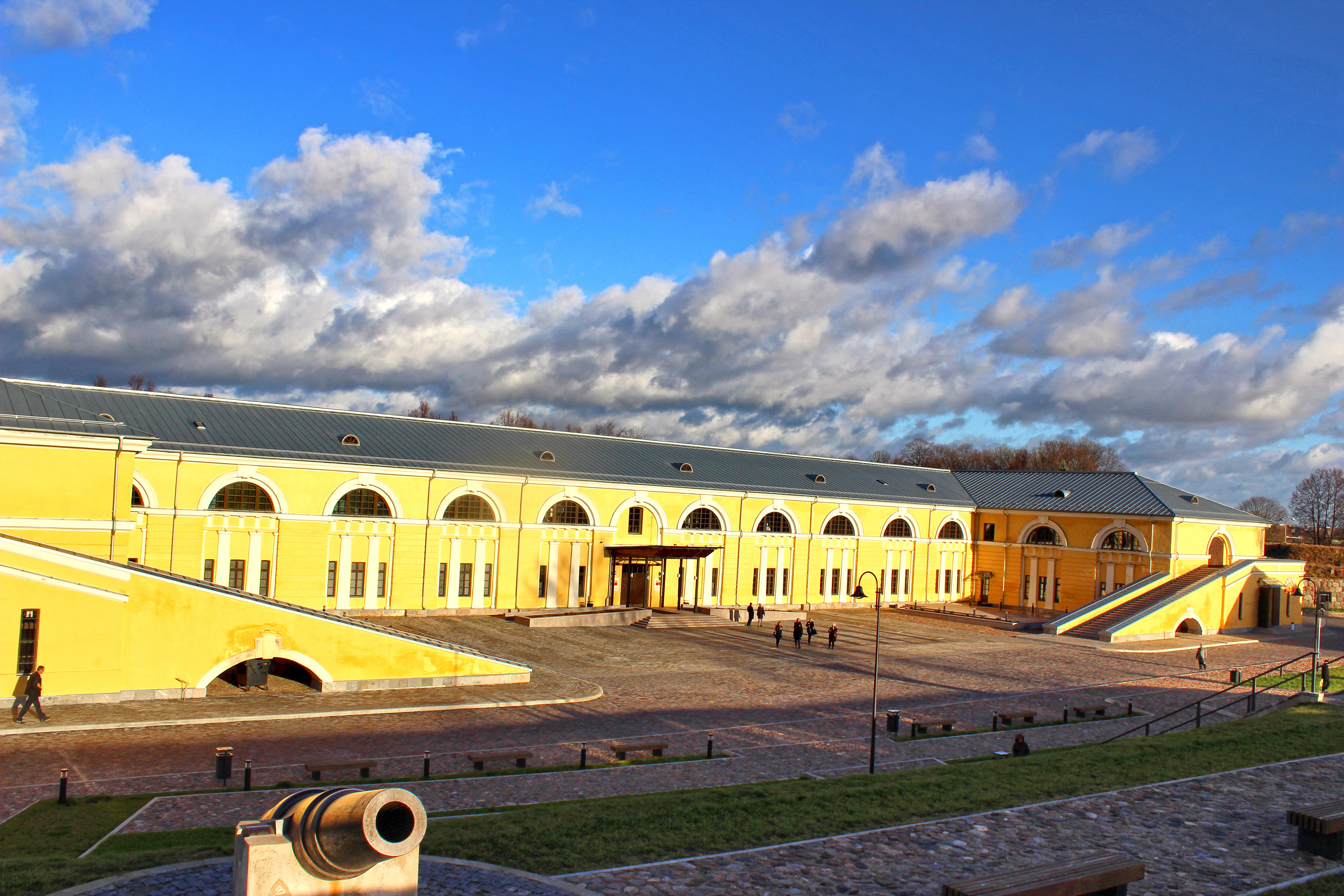
Rothko Museum in the Daugavpils fortress

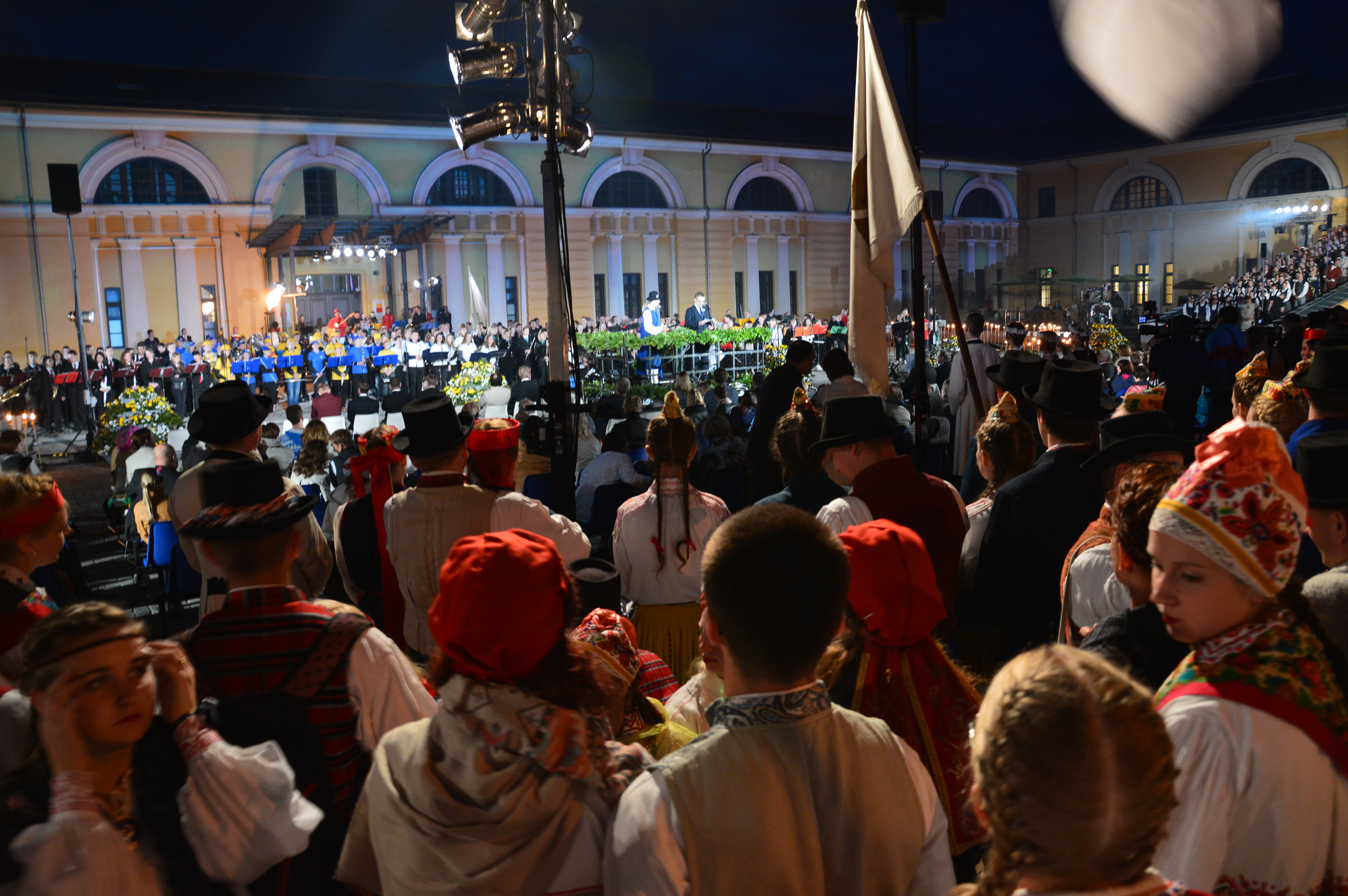
Opening of Gaudeamus festival in 2014 next to the Rothko Museum.

The Rothko Museum (Latvian: Rotko muzejs) is a cultural institution located inside the arsenal building of the Daugavpils fortress in Latvia. The art centre is considered unique as it is the only place in Europe that permanently, publicly displays some of the original paintings produced by Mark Rothko, albeit on loan from his estate. He is considered to be one of the greatest artists of the 20th century and was categorized by others as a member of the abstract expressionism movement for his famous serene, few-color, rectangle, large paintings.

Project development timeline of the Rothko Museum (former Daugavpils Mark Rothko Art Centre):

- 2002: the birth of idea of the Daugavpils Mark Rothko Art Centre's foundation;
- 2013, April 24: opening of the Daugavpils Mark Rothko Art Centre;
- 2013, September 25: Mark's Rothko 110th anniversary celebrations.

== Exhibitions and Facilities ==
The Rothko Museum the following exhibitions:

- Rothko Room with original works displayed
- Silent Room
- A digital exhibit on the artist's biography and creative activities
- Project Gallery exhibit, collection of contemporary arts
- Exhibitions of the Great Children of Daugavpils (formerly Dvinsk, Dünaburg).

The museum also includes the following facilities:

- The residences for artists
- Video hall
- Archive/library
- Conference/seminar facilities
- Meeting rooms
- Restaurant

== Mark Rothko paintings ==
Six artworks, loaned by Kate Rothko Prizel and Christopher Rothko, are on currently on permanent display at the Rothko Museum:

- Mother and Child, 1934
- Sacrifice of Iphigenia, 1942
- The High Priest, 1945
- Untitled, 1948
- Nr 7 (orange and chocolate), 1957
- No. 10 (brown, black, sienna on dark wine), 1963
