= Michael Woolworth =

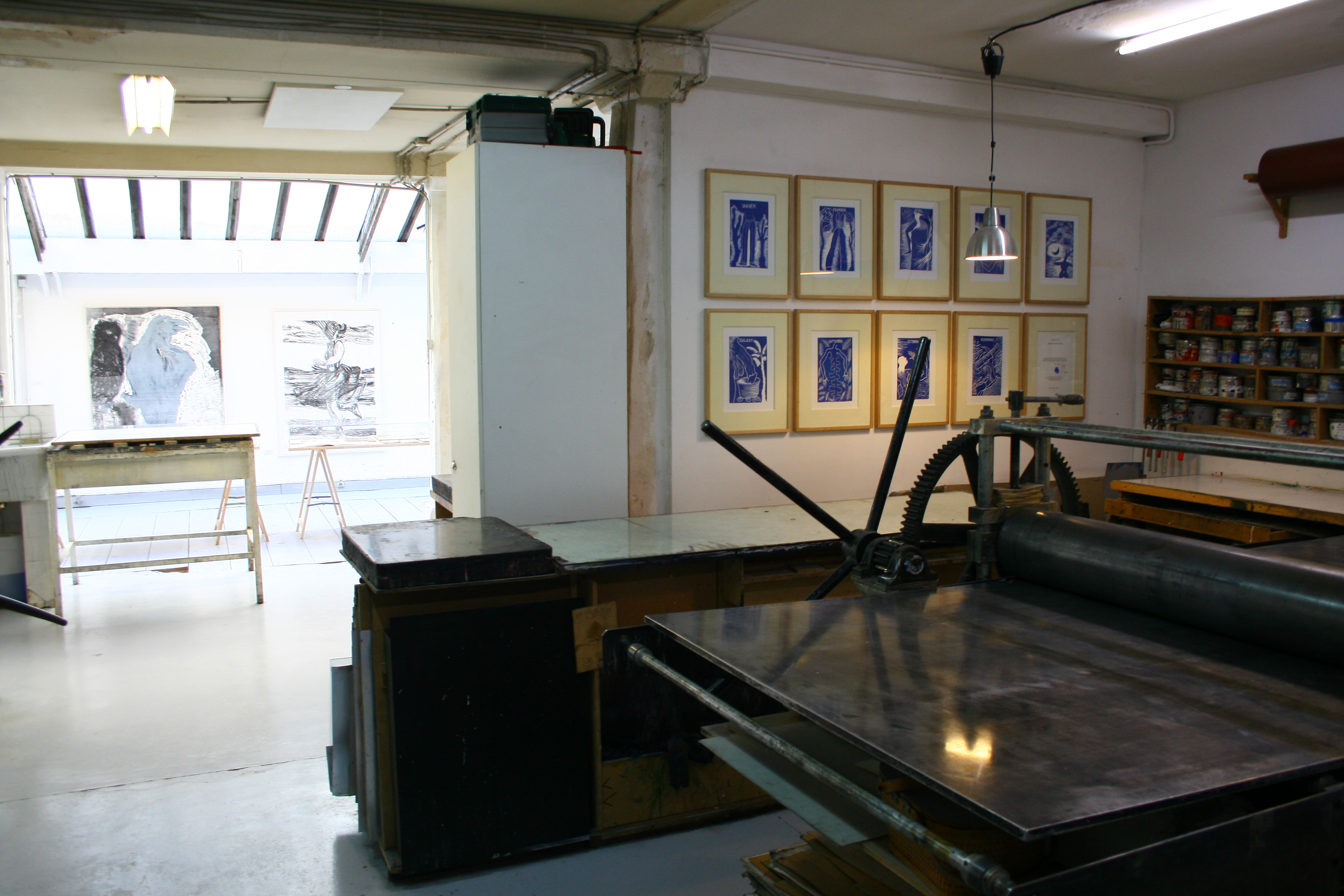
Michael Woolworth's atelier, Paris, France

Michael Woolworth (born in 1960) is a master printer of American origin, living and working in Paris. He makes original editions with contemporary artists. His atelier specializes exclusively in printing techniques on hand presses: stone lithography, woodcut, monotype, linocut, etching and multiples.

== Biography ==
Michael Woolworth moved to Paris from the United States in 1979 and began working with Franck Bordas (grandson of the French master printer and lithographer Fernand Mourlot), who had just established his own lithography studio. He worked there for six years, working with artists as Gilles Aillaud, Jorge Camacho, Henri Cueco, Erró, Daniel Pommereulle, Jean Messagier, Hervé Di Rosa, François Boisrond, Roberto Matta and Jean Dubuffet.

He opened his own Parisian atelier in 1985 with a project with the Surrealist Matta, bringing together 90 scenes inspired by Cervantes’ Don Quixote. He then undertook collaborations with Daniel Pommereulle and Jorge Camacho, and with several others, in particular the Spaniard José Maria Sicilia, with whom he began a long collaboration of more than 200 editions, among them, in 2004, a “rug” in lithography on 84 pieces of plaster measuring 3 m x 9 m, for an exhibition of contemporary art at the Louvre Museum.

Since 2003, he has produced a large number of works with the American artist Jim Dine, including more than one hundred prints, many in large format, as well as two lithography books on Pinocchio.

In 2011, Michael Woolworth was awarded the Chevalier dans l'Ordre des Arts et des Lettres and was also given the title by the French state of 'Maître d'Art'.

== Artists ==
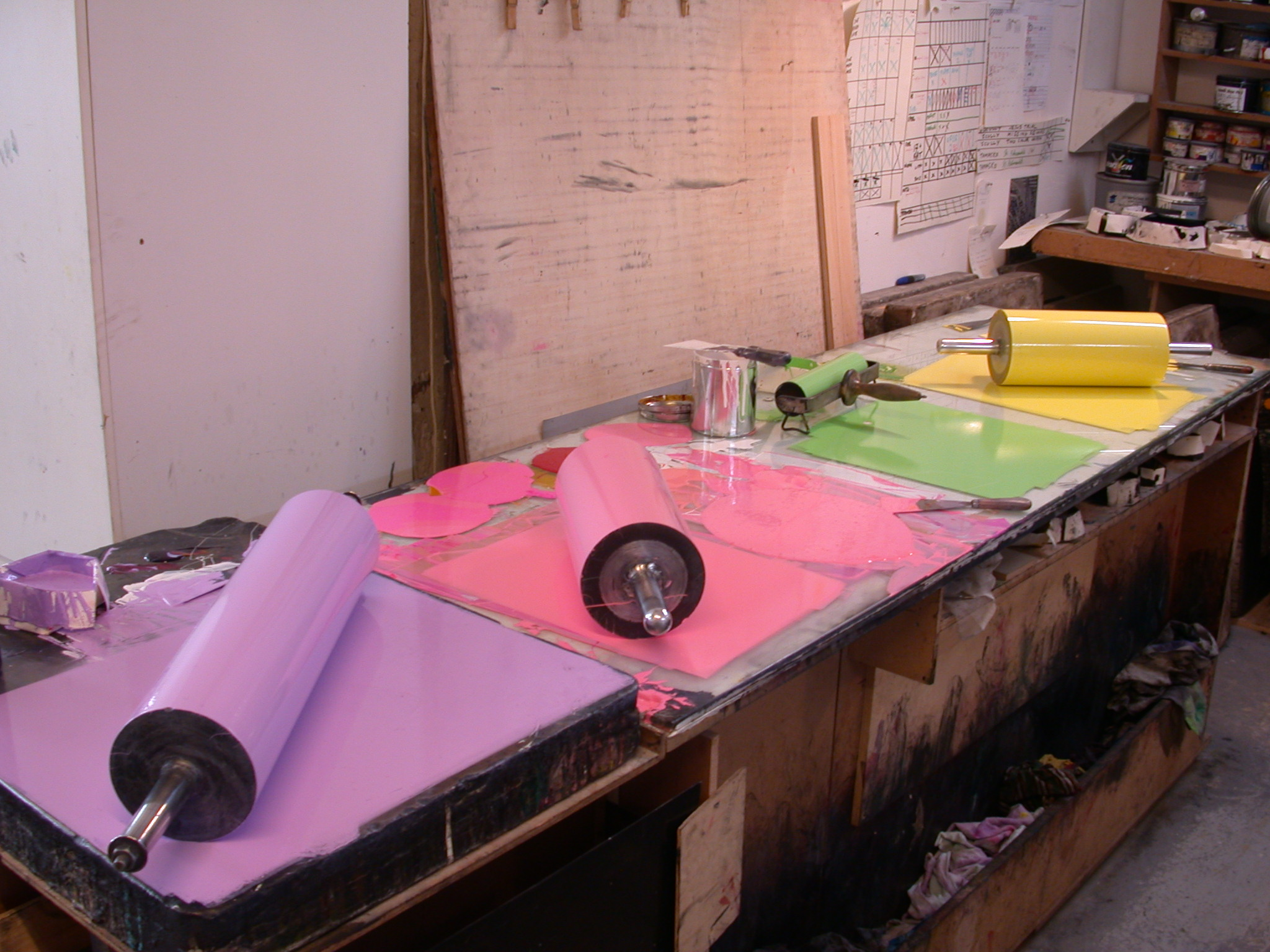

Some of the artists who have worked with him are:

- Arman
- Rémi Blanchard
- Stéphane Bordarier
- José Manuel Broto
- Jorge Camacho
- Miguel Ángel Campano
- Vincent Corpet
- Gunter Damisch
- Marc Desgrandchamps
- Jim Dine
- Brecht Evens
- Günther Forg
- Richard Gorman
- Marie-Ange Guilleminot
- Yuri Kuper
- Bertrand Lavier
- Frédérique Loutz
- Frédérique Lucien
- Pierre Mabille
- William MacKendree
- Matta
- Jean-François Maurige
- Jean-Michel Othoniel
- A.R. Penck
- Stéphane Pencréac'h
- Jaume Plensa
- Jean-Pierre Pincemin
- Sean Scully
- José Maria Sicilia
- Peter Soriano
- Djamel Tatah
- Barthélemy Toguo
- Claude Yvel
- Otto Zitko

== Collections ==
His publications have been acquired in many public and private collections, including:

Bibliothèque nationale de France
Centre Georges Pompidou, Paris
Fonds National d’art contemporain
Museum of Modern Art, New York
New York Public Library
Museum of Fine Arts, Boston
Brooklyn Museum, New York
Museo Nacional Centro de Arte Reina Sofía, Spain
National Museum of Canberra, Australia
University of Leipzig Library
Academy of Fine Arts, Vienna
Le Centre de la Gravure et de l'Image imprimée, La Louvière, Belgium
Kyoto Art Museum, Japan

Metropolitan Museum of Art, New York

De Reede Museum, Antwerp

== Exhibitions ==
Michael Woolworth organizes and participates in events and exhibitions in his atelier, located just off the Place de la Bastille, as well as in galleries, museums, libraries and art fairs. Selected recent exhibitions:

2011
Musee d'Art Moderrne de la Ville de Paris, Marc Desgrandchamps.
Château de Chambord, Djamel Tatah.
Atelier Michael Woolworth, ‘ANDERS’, project with Frédérique Loutz, inspired by the fairy-tales by Hans Christian Andersen, with poems by Ernesto Castillo.

2010
Jim Dine exhibition at the Atelier Woolworth : book launching of Donkey in the Sea Before Us, published by the atelier with lithographs and original poems by Dine.

2009
Museum of Modern Art, Boras, Sweden, exhibition on ‘Jim Dine’s Pinocchio’.
‘La Force de l'Art 02’, Paris. Large installation by Frédérique Loutz at the Grand Palais, with the “Fèdre” project and a wallpaper produced by the atelier.

2008
‘5 / 5: Loud and Clear’, Librairie Saint-Hubert, Brussels - Vincent Corpet, Marc Desgrandchamps, Frédérique Loutz, Stéphane Pencréac’h, Djamel Tatah
Lithography by A.R. Penck created for the Musée d’art moderne de la ville, Paris.

2007
Vitrine by Djamel Tatah, Centre Georges Pompidou, in conjunction with the exhibition ‘Airs de Paris’.
‘L’Odyssée de Jim Dine’, Musée des Beaux-Arts de Caen, France.

2006
‘Jim Dine’s Pinocchio’, New York Public Library.
‘Peinture et poésie : le dialogue par le livre’, New York Public Library, with the artist’s book Impromptu by José Maria Sicilia, with poems by Jacques Dupin.

2005
‘Jim Dine. Plants and Tools’, Alan Cristea Gallery, London.

2004
‘Jim Dine’s Garden’, Pace Prints, New York.
Musée du Louvre, Paris. ‘Contrepoint’, installation by José Maria Sicilia.
