= Otto Zitko =

Austrian artist (born 1959)

Otto Zitko (born in Linz on 14 February 1959) is an Austrian artist who lives and works in Vienna.

== Exhibitions (selection since 2000) ==
- 2010 Me, Myself and I – Otto Zitko and Louise Bourgeois, Arnolfini, Bristol

getting hot, Krobath, Berlin

- 2009 Die Kunst ist super!, Hamburger Bahnhof – Museum für Gegenwart, Berlin
- 2008 espacio marte, México City
- 2007 Galerie Elisabeth & Klaus Thoman, Innsbruck

Magic Line, MUSEION – Museum of Modern and Contemporary Art, Bolzano
Museum of Contemporary Art, Leipzig (GfZK)

- 2006 Galería Heinrich Ehrhardt, Madrid (with Herbert Brandl)

Galerie Krobath Wimmer, Vienna
Soleil Noir. Depression and Society, Salzburger Kunstverein, Salzburg
Bunkier Sztuki, Contemporary Art Gallery, Krakow

- 2005 Museum of Contemporary Art KIASMA, Helsinki

China retour, MUMOK, Museum Moderner Kunst Stiftung Ludwig Wien, Vienna

- 2004 Austrian Cultural Forum Prague

The Moravian Gallery Brno (with Josef Dabernig)

- 2003 Cheim & Read, New York

Franz West Vis-à-Vis Otto Zitko, Tim Van Laere Gallery, Antwerp (with Franz West)
© EUROPE EXISTS, MMCA, Macedonian Museum of Contemporary Art, Thessaloniki
Galerie Elisabeth & Klaus Thoman, Innsbruck

- 2002 Galerie de l’École des Beaux-Arts, Caen

Uncommon Denominator, MASS MoCA, Massachusetts Museum of Contemporary Art, North Adams, MA
Galería Heinrich Ehrhardt, Madrid

- 2001 International Contemporary Art, Museo de Arte Moderno / Museum of Modern Art, Mexico City
- 2000 Cheim & Read, New York

Galerie Krobath Wimmer, Vienna

== Bibliography ==
- Pythia. Edition Antagon #2, Salzburg 2008.Text: Hemma Schmutz
- The Construction of Gesture. Eds. Hemma Schmutz, Salzburger Kunstverein, Salzburg / Barbara Steiner, GfZK Galerie für Zeitgenössische Kunst Leipzig / Ingeburg Wurzer, Atelier Otto Zitko, Wien, Berlin 2008. Text: Jan Avgikos, Hemma Schmutz, Andreas Spiegl, Barbara Steiner
- Räume. Kunsthalle Bern, 1996. Text: Ulrich Loock, Christian Kravagna
- Otto Zitko. Cheim & Read, New York, Vienna 2000. Text: Herbert Lachmayer
