= List of rectors of the University of Tartu =

List of rectors of the University of Tartu.

== Academia Gustaviana (1632–1665) ==
- Jakob Skytte (illustris, 1632–1633)
- Andreas Virginius (1633)
- Heinrich Hein (1633–1634)
- Johann Below (1634)
- Michael Savonius (prorector, 1634–1635)
- Georg Manzel (prorector, 1635–1636)
- Georg Manzel (1636)
- Lorenz Luden (1636–1637)
- Peter Schomer (1637–1638)
- Salomon Matthiae (1638)
- Andreas Virginius (1638–1639)
- Heinrich Hein (1639–1640)
- Johann Below (1641–1641)
- Andreas Virginius (1641–1642)
- Lorenz Luden (1642–1643)
- Johannes Ericsson (1643–1644)
- Salomon Matthiae (1644–1645)
- Andreas Virginius (1645–1646)
- Heinrich Hein (1648–1649)
- Salomon Matthiae (1649–1650)
- Sebastian Wirdig (1650–1651)
- Johannes Stiernstråle (1651–1652)
- Lorenz Luden (1652–1653)
- Joachim Schelen (1653–1654)
- Johannes Stiernstråle (1654–1655)
- Heinrich Hein (1655–1656)
- Andreas Virginius (prorector, in Tallinn, 1657)
- Georg Preuss (prorector, Tallinn, 1658)
- Gabriel Elffring (prorector, Tallinn, 1659–1660)
- Georg Preuss (prorector, Tallinn, 1661–1662)
- Gabriel Elffring (prorector, Tallinn, 1663–1665)

== Academia Gustavo-Carolina (1690–1710) ==
- Olaus Moberg (1690)
- Carl Lund (1690–1691)
- Lars Micrander (1691)
- Gustav Carlholm (1691–1692)
- Crispin Jernfeld (1692)
- Olaus Skragge (1692–1693)
- Gabriel Skragge (1693)
- Gabriel Sjöberg (1693–1694)
- Sven Cameenhjelm (1694)
- Sven Dimberg (1694–1695)
- Michael Dau (1695)
- Olaus Moberg (1695–1696)
- Olaus Skragge (1696)
- Jakob Friedrich Below (1696–1697)
- Gabriel Skragge (1697)
- Lars Molin (1697–1698)
- Gabriel Sjöberg (1698)
- Sven Cameenhjelm (1698–1699)
- Michael Dau (in Pärnu, 1699–1700)
- Daniel Sarcovius (Pärnu, 1700)
- Daniel Eberhard (Pärnu, 1700)
- Olaus Moberg (Pärnu, 1700–1701)
- Sven Cameenhjelm (Pärnu, 1701)
- Lars Molin (Pärnu, 1701–1702)
- Michael Dau (Pärnu, 1702)
- Johan Folcher (Pärnu, 1702–1703)
- Samuel Auseen (Pärnu, 1703)
- Daniel Sarcovius (Pärnu, 1703–1704)
- Anders Palmrooth (Pärnu, 1704)
- Erik Fahlenius (Pärnu, 1704–1705)
- Samuel Auseen (Pärnu, 1705)
- Lars Braun (Pärnu, 1705–1706)
- Johan Folcher (Pärnu, 1706–1707)
- Jakob Wilde (Pärnu, 1707)
- Ingemund Bröms (Pärnu, 1707–1708)
- Conrad Quensel (Pärnu, 1708)
- Nicolaus Wiraeus (Pärnu, 1708–1709)
- Carl Schultén (Pärnu, 1709)
- Elof Holstenius (Pärnu, 1709–1710)

== Kaiserliche Universität zu Dorpat (1802–1893) ==
- Georg Friedrich von Parrot (prorector, 1802–1803)
- Georg Friedrich von Parrot (1803)
- Daniel Georg Balk (1803–1804)
- Adam Christian Gaspari (1804–1805)
- Georg Friedrich von Parrot (1805–1806)
- Carl Friedrich Meyer (1806–1808)
- Christian Friedrich von Deutsch (1809–1810)
- David Hieronymus Grindel (1810–1812)
- Georg Friedrich von Parrot (1812–1813)
- Martin Ernst von Styx (prorector, 1813–1814)
- Martin Ernst von Styx (1814)
- Friedrich Eberhard Rambach (1814–1816)
- Christian Steltzer (1816)
- Ferdinand Giese (prorector, 1816–1817)
- Ferdinand Giese (1817–1818)
- Gustav von Ewers (1818–1830)
- Friedrich Wilhelm von Parrot (prorector, 1830–1831)
- Friedrich Wilhelm von Parrot (1831–1834)
- Johann Christian Moier (1834–1836)
- Christian Friedrich Neue (1836–1839)
- Karl Christian Ulmann (1839–1841)
- Alfred Wilhelm Volkmann (prorector, 1841–1842)
- Alfred Wilhelm Volkmann (1842)
- Christian Friedrich Neue (1843–1851)
- Eduard Haffner (1851–1858)
- Friedrich von Bidder (1858–1865)
- Guido Samson von Himmelstiern (1865–1868)
- Georg Philipp von Oettingen (1868–1876)
- Ottomar Meykov (1876–1881)
- Eduard von Wahl (1881–1885)
- Alexander Schmidt (1885–1890)
- Ottomar Meykov (1890–1892)
- Anton Budilovich (1892–1901)

== Kaiserliche Universität Jurjew (1893–1918) ==
- Anton Budilovich (1892–1901)
- Aleksandr Filippov (1901–1903)
- Grigori Levitski (1903–1905)
- Jevgeni Passek (1905–1908)
- Vissarion Aleksejev (prorector, 1908–1909)
- Vissarion Aleksejev 1909–1914)
- Pjotr Pustoroslev (1915–1917)
- Vissarion Aleksejev (1917–1918)

== Landesuniversität Dorpat (1918) ==
- Karl Dehio (1918)

== Eesti Vabariigi Tartu Ülikool (1919–1940) ==
- Heinrich Koppel (1920–1928)
- Johan Kõpp (1928–1937)
- Richard Hugo Kaho (1938–1940)
- Heinrich Riikoja (1940)

== Eesti Omavalitsuse Tartu Ülikool (1941–1944) ==
- Edgar Kant (temporary, 1941–1944)

== Tartu Riiklik Ülikool (1940–1941 and 1944–1989) ==
- Hans Kruus (1940–1941 ja 1944)
- Alfred Koort (1944–1951)
- Feodor Klement (1951–1970)
- Arnold Koop (1970–1988)

== Tartu Ülikool (since 1989) ==
- Jüri Kärner (1988–1993)
- Peeter Tulviste (1993–1998)
- Jaak Aaviksoo (1998–2006)
- Tõnu Lehtsaar (acting, 2006–2007)
- Alar Karis (2007–2012)
- Volli Kalm (2012–2017, died in office)
- Tõnu Lehtsaar (acting, 2017–2018)
- Toomas Asser (2018–)
