= Aleksandr Filippov =

Aleksandr Filippov may refer to:

- Aleksandr Filippov (cyclist), Russian cyclist
- Aleksandr Filippov (footballer) (1892–1962), Russian footballer
- Aleksandr Filippov (legal scholar) (1853–1927), legal scholar, former Rector of Tartu University (1901–03)
- Aleksandr Filippov (philosopher) (1891–), Russian philosopher
- Sasha Filippov (1925–1942), Soviet spy
