= Christian Friedrich von Deutsch =

German medical researcher

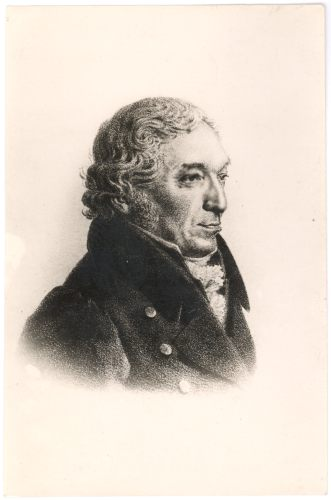
Christian Friedrich von Deutsch

Christian Friedrich von Deutsch (28 September 1768 – 17 April 1843) was a German medical researcher. 1808–1809 (or until 1810) he was the rector of Tartu University.

He studied at several universities in Germany. 1796-1804 he taught at Erlangen University. Since 1804 he taught at the Imperial University of Dorpat. Since 1835 he lived in Dresden.

Preceded by Carl Friedrich Meyer	Rector of the Imperial University of Dorpat; 1808–1810	Succeeded by David Hieronymus Grindel
