= Eduard Haffner =

Eduard Haffner (Johann Samuel Eduard von Haffner; 27 August 1804 – 25 January 1889) was a Baltic German educationist. 1851–1857 he was the rector of Tartu University.

He was born in Riga.

| Preceded by Christian Friedrich Neue | Rector of the Imperial University of Dorpat; 1851–1857 | Succeeded by Friedrich Bidder |
