= Jevgeni Passek =

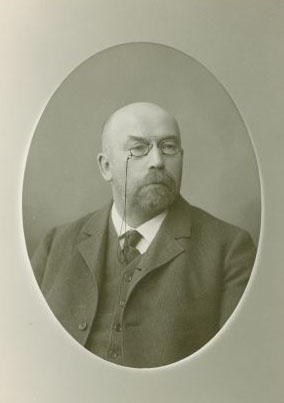
Jevgeni Passek

Jevgeni Passek (1860–1912) was a Russian lawyer. 1905–1907 he was the rector of Tartu University.

He studied at Moscow and Berlin University. Since 1891 he worked at Imperial University of Dorpat.

Preceded by Grigori Levitski	Rector of the Imperial University of Dorpat; 1905–1907	Succeeded by Vissarion Alekseyev
