= Anton Budilovich =

Russian linguist and politician

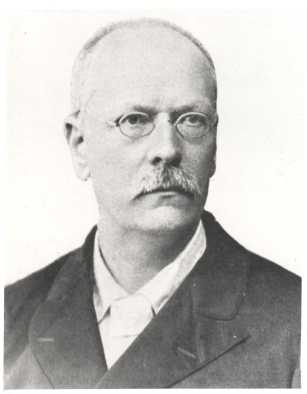
Anton Budilovich

Anton Budilovich (Russian: Анто́н Семёнович Будило́вич; Estonian: Anton Budilovitš; 5 June 1846 – 25 December 1908) was a Russian linguist and politician. During the years 1892–1901, he was the rector of Tartu University.

From 1881 until 1892, he worked at Warsaw University. After 1892, he worked at Imperial University of Dorpat.

Preceded by Ottomar Meykow	Rector of the Imperial University of Dorpat; 1892–1901	Succeeded by Aleksandr Filippov
