= Johann Christian Moier =

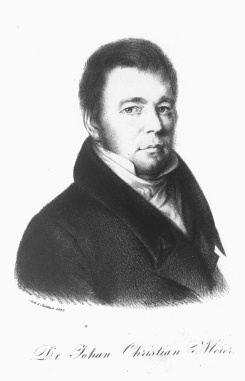
Johann Christian Moier

Johann Christian Moier (10 March 1786 – 1 April 1858) was a Baltic German medical researcher and surgeon. 1834–1836 he was the rector of Tartu University.

He was born in Reval (Tallinn).

1803–1805 he studied at Tartu University. After that he studied at Göttingen University and also at Padua university. Since 1813 he taught at the Imperial University of Dorpat. He worked as a professor of surgery at the University of Tartu from 1814 to 1836. From 1817 to 1830, Moier was briefly dean of the Faculty of Medicine at the University of Tartu on four occasions.

He was rector of the University of Tartu from 1834 to 1836.

Moier then moved to his estate in Bunino, Oryol Governorate, in Russia where he remained until his death.

Preceded by Friedrich Parrot	Rector of the Imperial University of Dorpat; 1834–1836	Succeeded by Christian Friedrich Neue
