= Alfred Wilhelm Volkmann =

German physiologist, anatomist, and philosopher (1801–1877)

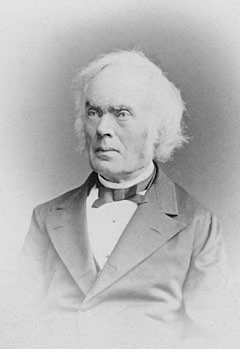
Alfred Wilhelm Volkmann

Alfred Wilhelm Volkmann (German: [ˈfɔlkman]; 1 July 1801 – 21 April 1877) was a German physiologist, anatomist, and philosopher. He specialized in the study of the nervous and optic system.

== Biography ==
Alfred Wilhelm Volkmann was born in Leipzig, and enrolled in medicine there in 1821. Together with Gustav Theodor Fechner, who got his degree in medicine in 1822, and Rudolph Hermann Lotze (1817–1881), they formed a small intellectual group which dissolved only in 1837 when Volkmann received his professorship at the Imperial University of Dorpat (now Tartu). In 1826 he obtained his doctorate and in 1828 he was habilitated as Privatdozent at the University of Leipzig. It was there that he became professor extraordinary of zootomy in 1834. In 1837 he went to Dorpat as professor of physiology, pathology and semiotics. However, his residence in Dorpat was short: he left for Halle as early as 1843. After moving to Halle, Volkmann helped Gustav Theodor Fechner, his brother-in-law (married to Volkmann's sister Clara Fechner), with many experiments that formed the foundation of the epochal Elemente der Psychophysik. (his daughter Anna Anschütz was later experimental subject for Fechner).

In 1854 Volkmann additionally took on the teaching of anatomy, until 1872, when physiology was branched off and given to Julius Bernstein.

Volkmann's house in Halle an der Saale was a center of the city's social life. Among his friends were the painters Wilhelm von Kügelgen, Friedrich Preller and Ludwig Richter, as well as the musicians Robert Franz, and Clara and Robert Schumann. In 1872, after his fiftieth doctoral jubilee, he retired completely from his university activities.

He died in Halle.

== Research ==
Today, Volkmann is most remembered for his additions to the physiology of the nervous system and physiological optics. In 1842 he demonstrated that sympathetic nerves were largely made up of medullated fibres arising from sympathetic and spinal ganglia. However, he also delineated and identified numerous features of gross anatomy, including Volkmann's canals. Probably equally important, however, are his contributions to psychophysics and perception research. Fechner developed his classical psychophysical Method of average error (already in use in astronomy) in co-operation with Volkmann. In his 1864 treatise, Volkmann studied Weber's law and reported that the threshold for distance discrimination increases with the increase of the reference distance. This was one of the first demonstrations of Weber's law in the visual domain. Volkmann's extensive experimental data in that book was the main basis on which Ewald Hering developed his theory of hyperacuity in 1899. Philosophically, Volkmann was an evangelical who opposed materialism and gave a number of speeches against the materialist assumption of identity between the body and mind.

== Family ==
Richard von Volkmann, his son, became a distinguished surgeon.

== Works ==
- Anatomy of Animals (1831–33)
- The Independence of the Sympathetic System of Nerves (1842)
- Elasticity of Muscles (1856)
- Physiological Investigations in the Field of Optics (Physiologische Untersuchungen im Gebiete der Optik) (1863) Partial Translation by Strasburger & Rose

== Sources ==
- B.G. Firkin & J.A.Whitworth (1987). Dictionary of Medical Eponyms. Parthenon Publishing. ISBN 1-85070-333-7
- Rines, George Edwin, ed. (1920). "Volkmann, Alfred Wilhelm" . Encyclopedia Americana.

Preceded by Karl Christian Ulmann	Rector of the Imperial University of Dorpat; 1841–1842	Succeeded by Christian Friedrich Neue
