= Friedrich Parrot =

Baltic German naturalist and explorer (1791–1841)

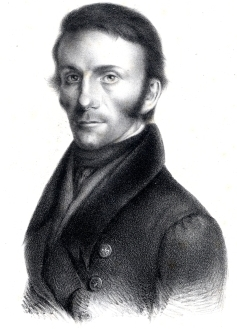
- Johann Jacob Friedrich Wilhelm Parrot. Portrait by Alexander Julius Klünder.
- Born: 14 October 1791; Karlsruhe, Margraviate of Baden, Holy Roman Empire
- Died: 15 January [O.S. 3 January] 1841 (aged 49); Dorpat, Kreis Dorpat, Governorate of Livonia, Russian Empire (present-day Tartu, Tartu County, Estonia)
- Education: Imperial University of Dorpat
- Known for: First recorded ascent of Mount Ararat
- Scientific career
- Fields: Natural history, Physics
- Workplaces: Imperial University of Dorpat

Johann Jacob Friedrich Wilhelm Parrot (14 October 1791 – 15 January [O.S. 3 January] 1841) was a Baltic German naturalist, explorer, and mountaineer, who lived and worked in Tartu, Estonia in what was then the Governorate of Livonia of the Russian Empire. A pioneer of Russian and Estonian scientific mountaineering, Parrot is best known for leading the first expedition to the summit of Mount Ararat in recorded history.

== Early career ==
Born in Karlsruhe, in the Margraviate of Baden, Parrot was the son of Georg Friedrich Parrot, the first rector of the Imperial University of Dorpat and a close friend of Tsar Alexander I. He studied medicine and natural science at Dorpat and, in 1811, undertook an expedition to the Crimea and the Caucasus with Moritz von Engelhardt. There he used a barometer to measure the difference in sea level between the Caspian Sea and Black Sea. On his return he was appointed assistant doctor and, in 1815, surgeon in the Imperial Russian Army. In 1816 and 1817, he visited the Alps and Pyrenees. In 1821, he was professor of physiology and pathology, then in 1826 professor of physics at the University of Dorpat.

== Conquest of Ararat ==
After the Russo-Persian War of 1826–28, Mount Ararat came under Russian control by the terms of the Treaty of Turkmenchay. Parrot felt that the conditions were now right to reach the peak of the mountain. With a team of science and medical students, Parrot left Dorpat in April 1829 and traveled south to Russian Transcaucasia and Armenia to climb Ararat. The project received full approval from Tsar Nicholas I, who provided the expedition with a military escort.

On the way to Russian Armenia, Parrot and his team split into two parts. Most of the team traveled to Mozdok, while Parrot, Maximilian Behaghel von Adlerskron, and the military escort Schütz traveled to the Manych River and the Kalmyk Steppe to conduct further research on the levels between the Black and Caspian Seas. The two teams reunited at Mozdok and moved south, first to Georgia, then to the Armenian Oblast. An outbreak of plague in Russian Armenia and the vicinity of Erivan (Yerevan) delayed the expedition and the team visited the eastern Georgian province of Kakheti until it subsided. They then traveled from Tiflis to Etchmaidzin, where Parrot met Khachatur Abovian, the future Armenian writer and national public figure. Parrot required a local guide and a translator for the expedition. The Armenian Catholicos Yeprem I assigned Abovian to these tasks.

Accompanied by Abovian, Parrot and his team crossed the Arax River into the district of Surmalu and headed to the Armenian village of Akhuri (modern Yenidoğan) situated on the northern slope of Ararat 1,200 metres (3,900 ft) above sea level. Following the advice of Harutiun Alamdarian of Tiflis, they set up base camp at the Monastery of St. Hakob some 700 metres (2,300 ft) higher, at an elevation of 1,943 metres (6,375 ft). Parrot and Abovian were among the last travelers to visit Akhuri and the monastery before a disastrous earthquake completely buried both in May 1840. Their first attempt to climb the mountain, using the northeast slope, failed as a result of lack of warm clothing.

Six days later, on the advice of Stepan Khojiants, the village chief of Akhuri, the ascent was attempted from the northwest side. After reaching an elevation of 16,028 feet (4,885 m), they turned back because they did not reach the summit before sundown. Accompanied by Abovian, two Russian soldiers, and two Armenian villagers, Parrot reached the summit on the third attempt at 3:15 p.m. on 9 October 1829. Abovian dug a hole in the ice and erected a wooden cross facing north. He picked up a chunk of ice from the summit and carried it down with him in a bottle, considering the water holy. On 8 November, Parrot and Abovian climbed up Lesser Ararat. Parrot was impressed with Abovian's thirst for knowledge and, after the expedition, arranged for a Russian state scholarship for Abovian to study at the University of Dorpat in 1830.

== Later life ==
In 1837, Parrot went to Tornio in the northern part of the Grand Duchy of Finland to observe oscillations of a pendulum and terrestrial magnetism. He invented a gasometer and a baro-thermometer. In Livonia, he popularised the Catalan sundial, a small, cylindrical, pocket-sized instrument, approximately 8 cm in length and 1.5 cm in diameter.

Parrot died in Dorpat in January 1841 and was buried at Raadi cemetery. He was survived by his daughter, Anna Magaretha Parrot, who married Conrad Jacob Strauch. Their descendants now reside in Australia. Today Parrot is regarded as a pioneer of Russian and Estonian mountaineering. In Armenia, he is celebrated for his role in the Ararat ascent and for his friendship with Abovian.

== Honours and legacy ==
- The Parrotia deciduous tree is named for Parrot.
- The Parrotspitze peak in the Pennine Alps is named for Parrot.
- Mount J. F. Parrot near Tartu Ülikool 350 in the Pamir Mountains in Tajikistan is named for Parrot.
- In 1935, the International Astronomical Union named a crater on the near side of the Moon after Parrot.
- The 2011 documentary film Journey to Ararat on Parrot and Abovian's expedition to Mount Ararat was produced in Estonia by filmmaker Riho Västrik. It was screened at the Golden Apricot International Film Festival in Yerevan in 2013.

Preceded by Gustav von Ewers	Rector of the Imperial University of Dorpat; 1830–1834	Succeeded by Johann Christian Moier
