= Carl Schultén =

Swedish orientalist

Carl Schultén (1677 in Västmanland – 1730 in Lund) was a Swedish orientalist who was a professor and later the rector of the Academia Gustavo-Carolina (modern-day University of Tartu) in 1709, and the rector for Lund University in 1721. He previously was the first ever professor of eastern languages at the university and later became the third ever professor of theology there. He was the son of Pastor Samuel Schultenius and Margareta Schultin, and his aunt was Haqvin Spegel's wife. His brother, Samuel Schulteen, was a professor in Turku. One of his daughters was married to Carl Tiliander.

Preceded by Nicolaus Wiraeus	Rector of Academia Gustavo-Carolina; 1709	Succeeded by Elof Holstenius
Preceded by Arvid Moller	Rector of Lund University; 1721	Succeeded by Jacob Benzelius
