= Heinrich Riikoja =

Estonian zoologist and hydrobiologist

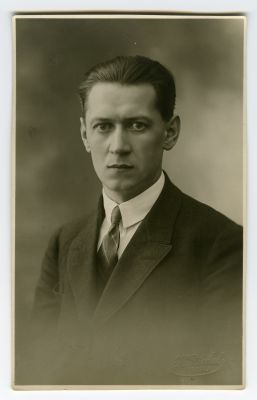
Heinrich Riikoja

Heinrich Roman Riikoja (until 1924 Reichenbach; 8 March 1891 Rakke – 31 October 1988 Tartu) was an Estonian zoologist and hydrobiologist.

From 1910 to 1918, he studied at the University of Tartu, initially chemistry and later natural sciences. He participated in the Estonian War of Independence. From 1919 to 1958 he taught at the University of Tartu.

From 1920 onward, he directed investigations of Estonian inland bodies of water. He is known as the founder of Estonian hydrobiology. Among other things, he compiled a list of Estonian lakes and a list of Estonian fishes.

In 1940 he was the rector of the University of Tartu.

From 1922 to 1943, he was the representative of Estonia to International Society of Limnology.

Awards:

- 1945: Estonian SSR merited scientist
- 1977: Estonian SSR state prize

== Works ==
- Zooloogia praktikum keskkoolidele (1921)
- Selgrootute loomade süstemaatiline nimestik (1923, with Johannes Voldemar Veski)
- Kodumaa kalad (1927)
- Eestikeelseid zooloogilisi oskussõnu (1930, with Johannes Voldemar Veski)
- Tamula ja Vagula järv (1932–33)
- Aegviidu ümbruse järvedest (1935–36)
- Eesti järvede nimestik (1934, with Jaan Port and others)
- Eesti NSV kalad (1950)
