= Martin Ernst von Styx =

Martin Ernst von Styx (30 December 1759 – 25 March 1829) was a Baltic German medical researcher. 1813–1814 he was the rector of Tartu University.

He was born in Riga.

He was a professor of materia medica and medical history at the Imperial University of Dorpat.

He died in Tartu.

Preceded by Georg Friedrich Parrot	Rector of the Imperial University of Dorpat; 1813–1814	Succeeded by Friedrich Eberhard Rambach
