= Tõnu Lehtsaar =

Estonian psychologist

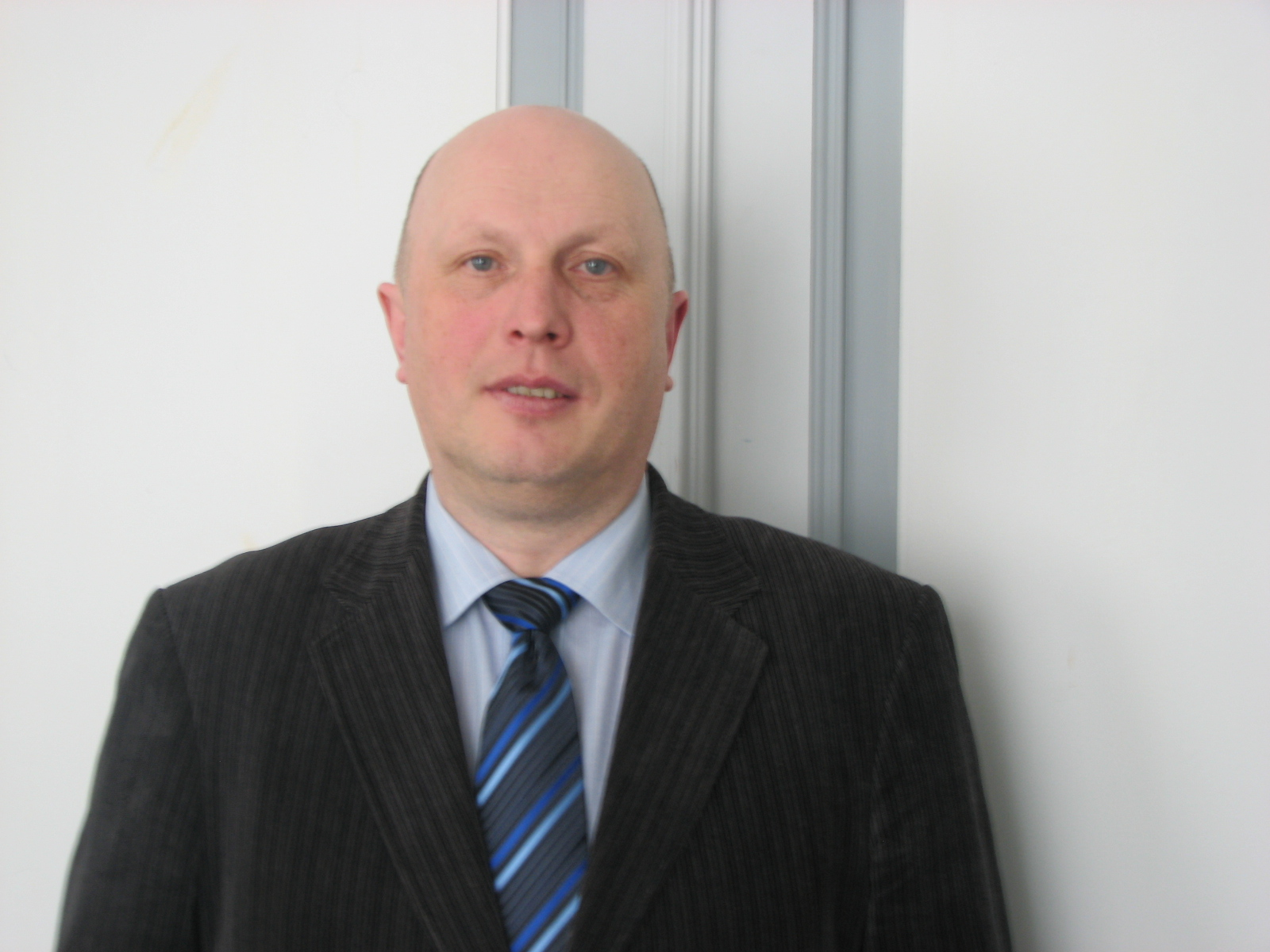
Tõnu Lehtsaar

Tõnu Lehtsaar (born 2 May 1960, Tartu) is an Estonian psychologist.

He graduated from Tartu State University in psychology in 1983.

From 2000 until 2016, he was a professor of psychology of religion at the University of Tartu. From 2006 to 2007 and again from 2017 to 2018, he was the acting rector of the University of Tartu.

== Awards ==
- 1997: Order of the White Star, IV class.
