= Adam Christian Gaspari =

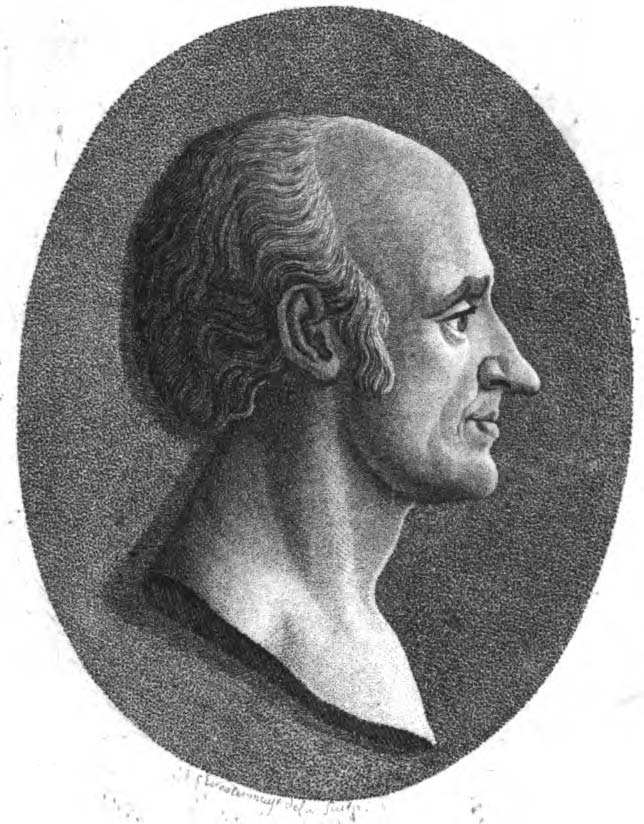
Adam Christian Gaspari

Adam Christian Gaspari (18 November 1752 – 27 May 1830) was a German geographer. 1804–1805 he was the rector of Tartu University.

He was born in Schleusingen.

He was a professor at the Imperial University of Dorpat.

In 1810 he moved to Königsberg. He died in Königsberg.

Preceded by Daniel Georg Balk	Rector of the Imperial University of Dorpat; 1804–1805	Succeeded by Georg Friedrich Parrot
