= Friedrich Eberhard Rambach =

Friedrich Eberhard Rambach (14 July 1767 – 30 June 1826) was a German philologist. 1814–1815 (or until 1816) he was the rector of Tartu University.

He was born in Quedlinburg.

He graduated from Halle and Berlin University. Starting in 1803 he worked at the Imperial University of Dorpat.

He died in Reval (Tallinn).

Preceded by Martin Ernst von Styx	Rector of the Imperial University of Dorpat; 1814–1816	Succeeded by Christian Steltzer
