= Carl Friedrich Meyer =

German legal scholar

Carl Friedrich Meyer (16 February 1757 – 27 November 1817) was a German legal scholar. From 1805 until 1808 he was the rector of Tartu University.

He was born in Göttingen.

He graduated from Göttingen University. 1792–1802 he has several legal posts in Dorpat (Tartu). Beginning in 1802 he worked at the Imperial University of Dorpat.

He died in Dorpat (Tartu).

Preceded by Georg Friedrich Parrot	Rector of the Imperial University of Dorpat; 1805–1808	Succeeded by Christian Friedrich von Deutsch
