= Ferdinand Giese =

Ferdinand Giese (Johann Emanuel Ferdinand Giese; 13 January 1781 – 22 May 1821) was a Baltic German pharmacologist. 1817–1818 he was the rector of Tartu University.

He graduated from Erfurt University. 1804–1814 he worked at Kharkiv University. Since 1814 he taught at the Imperial University of Dorpat.

Preceded by Christian Steltzer	Rector of the Imperial University of Dorpat; 1817–1818	Succeeded by Gustav von Ewers
