= Christian Steltzer =

German legal scholar (1758–1831)

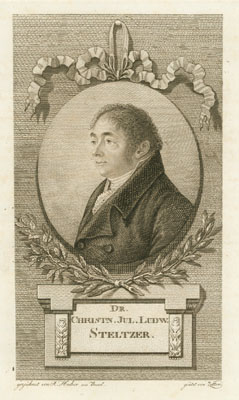
Christian Steltzer

Christian Steltzer (Christian Julius Ludwig Steltzer; 16 February 1758 – 8 October 1831) was a German legal scholar. 1816–1817 he was the rector of Tartu University.

He was born in Salzwedel.

He graduated from Halle University. Since 1815 he worked at the Imperial University of Dorpat.

Preceded by Friedrich Eberhard Rambach	Rector of the Imperial University of Dorpat; 1816–1817	Succeeded by Ferdinand Giese
