= Daniel Georg Balk =

Daniel Georg Balk (23 June 1764 – 1826) was a German medical researcher. 1803–1804 he was the rector of Tartu University.

He was born in Königsberg.

He established Tartu University Clinic.

He died in Tula, Russia.

Preceded by Georg Friedrich Parrot	Rector of the Imperial University of Dorpat; 1803–1804	Succeeded by Adam Christian Gaspari
