= Gustav von Ewers =

German legal historian (1779–1830)

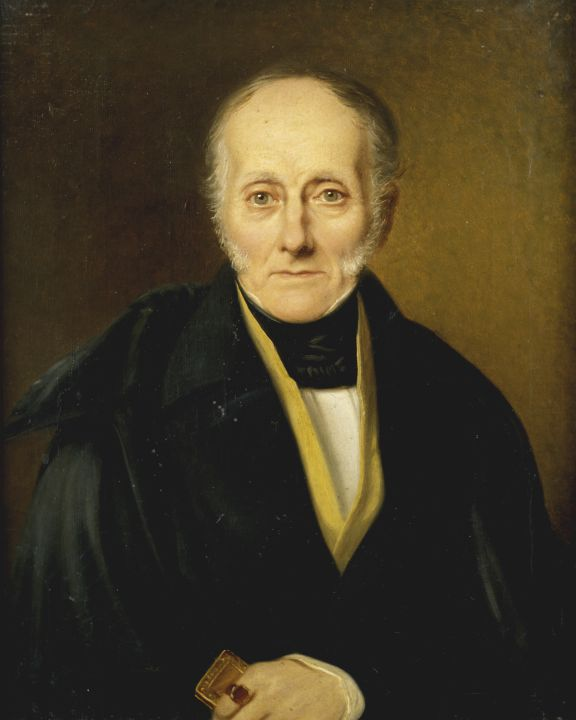
Portrait by Karl August Senff, 1838

Johann Philipp Gustav von Ewers or Evers (27 July 1779 – 20 November 1830) was a German legal historian and the founder of Russian legal history as a scholarly discipline.

Ewers was a farmer’s son from the village of Amelunxen (now a part of Beverungen) in the Bishopric of Paderborn. He first studied theology and then political science at the University of Göttingen.

His first employment, as was customary for a graduate from a poor background, was as a private tutor. This brought him to the Imperial Russian province of Livonia, where he was to remain for the rest of his life. While teaching, he pursued his scholarly interests, especially regarding Russian political and legal history, which became one of his main fields of study – one indeed of which he is often regarded the founder.

Influenced by the Hegelian definition of society and state, he described the traditional tribal structure of Russia as the foundation of Russian statehood, most notably in this 1826 monograph Das älteste Recht der Russen. Evers' ideas have found a continued reception among Russian legal theorists.

On the basis of his publications, he was offered in 1810 the Chair of History, Statistics, and Geography of the Russian State at the Imperial University of Dorpat (now Tartu) in what is today Estonia. He occupied that chair until 1826, when he transferred to the law faculty. In 1816, Ewers declined an offer of the Chair of Political Economy at the newly founded University of Berlin. In the same year, he had become Prorector of the University of Dorpat and in 1818, Rector, to which office he was re-elected every year until his death at Dorpat in 1830, aged 51.

== Selected works ==
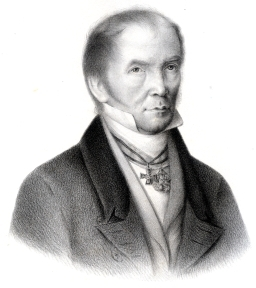
Gustav von Ewers in 1827. Portrait by Alexander Julius Klünder

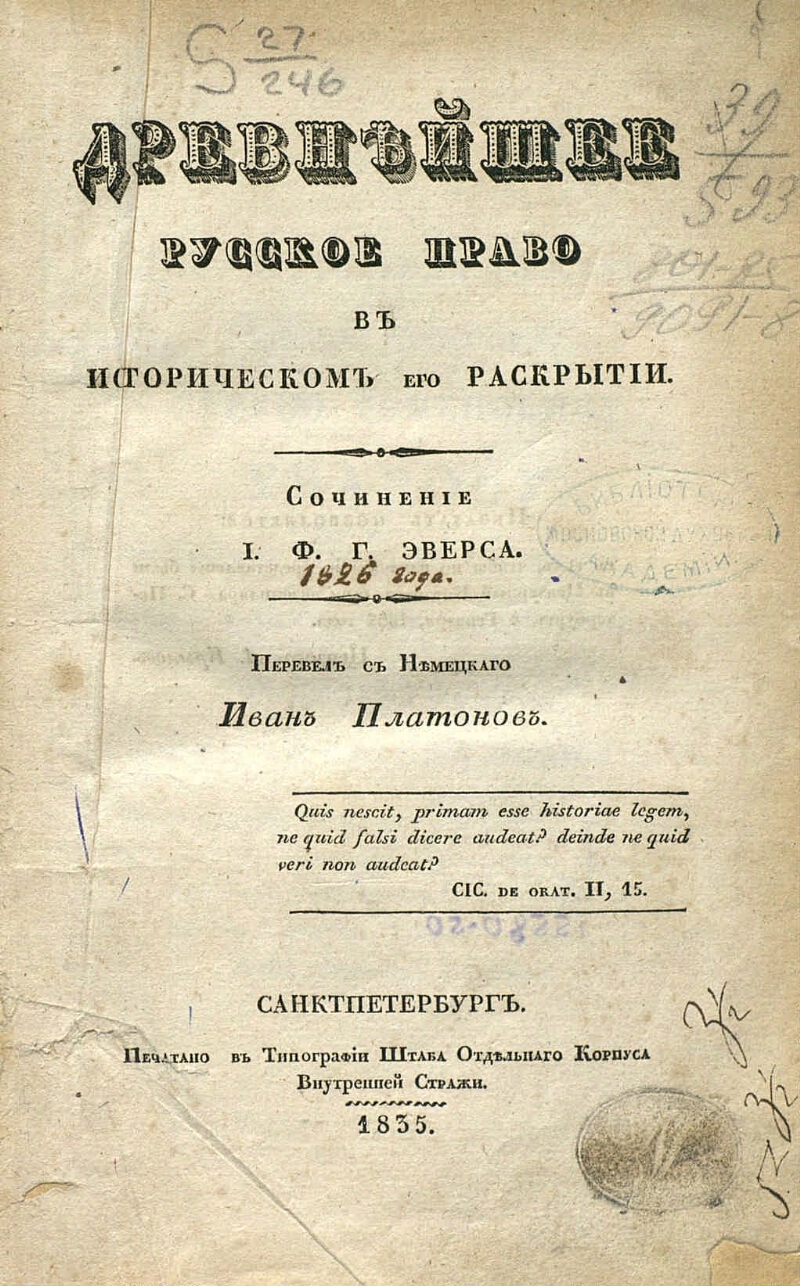
Title-page of the russian translation by Ivan Platonov of von Ewers' Das älteste Recht der Russen in geschichtlicher Entwicklung, St. Petersburg 1835

- Provisorische Verfassung des Bauernstandes in Estland. 1805, 1806.
- Vom Ursprung des Russischen Staats. 1808
- Unangenehme Erinnerungen an August Ludwig Schlözer. 1810.
- Kritische Vorarbeiten zur Geschichte der Russen, 2 vols., 1814.
- Geschichte der Russen, vol. 1. 1816.
- Das älteste Recht der Russen in seiner geschichtlichen Entwicklung. 1826.
- Rhapsodische Gedanken über die wissenschaftliche Bedeutung des Naturrechts. 1828.

Preceded by Ferdinand Giese	Rector of the Imperial University of Dorpat; 1818–1830	Succeeded by Friedrich Parrot
