= Klunder =

Klunder is a surname. Notable people with the surname include:

- Alexander Julius Klünder (1802–1875), Baltic-German painter
- Bruce W. Klunder (1937–1964), American civil rights activist
- Casey Klunder (fl. 2003–present), American baseball coach
- Erich Klünder (fl. 1944), recipient of the Knight's Cross of the Iron Cross
- Harold Klunder (born 1943), Canadian painter
- John Klunder (born 1940), Australian politician
- Matthew L. Klunder (born 1960), American rear admiral and former Chief of Naval Research
