= Aleksandr Filippov (legal scholar) =

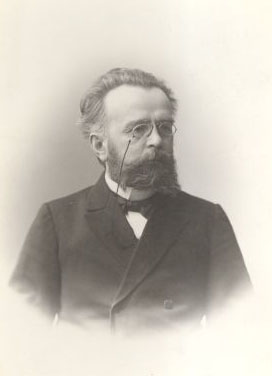
Aleksandr Filippov

Aleksandr Filippov (14 August 1853 – 27 January 1927) was a Russian legal scholar. 1901–1903 he was the rector of Tartu University.

In 1879, he graduated from Moscow University. Since 1892 he worked at Imperial University of Dorpat. Since 1903 he worked at Moscow University.

Preceded by Anton Budilovich	Rector of the Imperial University of Dorpat; 1901–1903	Succeeded by Grigori Levitski
