= Elof Holstenius =

Swedish scholar, rector of Tartu University

Elof Holstenius (also spelled Elaus, Elavus, Olaus; 2 October 1677 in Västerås – 18 July 1736 in Husby) was a Swedish professor of theoretical philosophy and later, from 1709 to 1710, the rector of the Academia Gustavo-Carolina in Pärnu. He studied at Uppsala University. He would be the last rector of the Academia Gustavo-Carolina at large, with Georg Friedrich Parrot becoming the succeeding rector of the university, renamed the Kaiserliche Universität zu Dorpat, in 1802, nearly a century after the term of Holstenius.

Preceded by Carl Schultén	Rector of Academia Gustavo-Carolina; 1709–1710	Succeeded by Georg Friedrich Parrot (as rector of the Kaiserliche Universität zu Dorpat)
