= Jüri Kärner =

Estonian biologist

Jüri Kärner (2010)

Jüri Kärner (25 April 1940 – 25 September 2010) was an Estonian biologist.

1988-1993 he was the rector of Tartu University.

Awards:

- 1997: Order of the National Coat of Arms, III class.
