= Ottomar Meykow =

Baltic German legal scholar

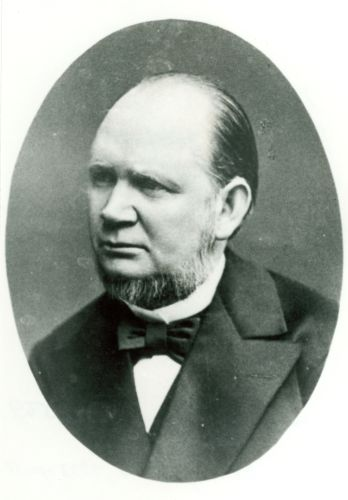
Ottomar Meykow

Ottomar Johann Friedrich Meykow (7 January 1823 – 5 February 1894) was a Baltic German legal scholar, 1876–1881 and 1890–1892 rector of the University of Tartu.

He studied at the Imperial University of Dorpat, 1847 mag. iur. and 1850 dr. iur. Since 1857 he taught at the university.
