= Alfred Koort =

Estonian philosopher

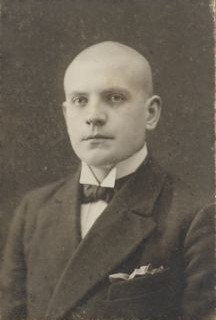
Alfred Koort in 1920

Alfred Koort (29 May 1901 – 28 September 1956) was an Estonian philosopher.

Koort was born in Viljandi. From 1944 until 1951, he was the University of Tartu.

He was a member of Estonian Academy of Sciences.

Awards:

- 1939: Order of the Estonian Red Cross, IV class.

== Works ==
- 1938 Sissejuhatus filosoofiasse. Tartu: Akadeemiline Kooperatiiv
- 1938 Kaasaegset filosoofiat I. Tartu : Akadeemiline Kooperatiiv
- 1938 Beiträge zur Logik des Typusbegriffs. Tartu: [s.n.]
- 1996. Inimese meetod. (Compiled by Hando Runnel.) Tartu: Ilmamaa
