= Fyodor Klement =

Estonian physicist, rector of Tartu University

Fyodor Dmitriyevich Klement (or Feodor Klement; 12 June 1903, Saint Petersburg – 28 June 1973, Tartu) was a Soviet and Estonian physicist and academician. Although born to Estonian parents, his native language was Russian. Klement's specialty was luminescence.

From 1951 to 1970, he was the rector of Tartu State University. While there, he worked to return Tartu to its prewar eminence in research, founding a solid-state physics laboratory.

He was a member of the Estonian Academy of Sciences.
