= Georg Friedrich Parrot =

German scientist (1767–1852)

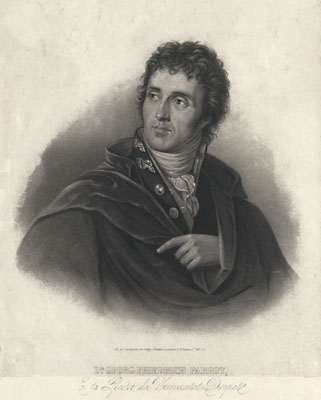
- Georg Friedrich Parrot. Portrait by Pavel Smirnov, Saint Petersburg.
- Born: 15 July 1767; Mömpelgard, Duchy of Württemberg
- Died: 8 July 1852 (aged 85); Helsingfors, Grand Duchy of Finland, Russian Empire
- Education: University of Stuttgart, University of Königsberg
- Known for: First rector of the Imperial University of Dorpat
- Scientific career
- Fields: Physics
- Workplaces: Imperial University of Dorpat, Russian Imperial Academy of Sciences

Georg Friedrich Parrot (15 July 1767 – 8 July 1852) was a German scientist and the first rector of the Imperial University of Dorpat in the Governorate of Livonia of the Russian Empire.

== Education ==
Georges-Frédéric Parrot was born in Mömpelgard (now Montbéliard) (then part of the Duchy of Württemberg, from 1806 in France). His father, a surgeon by profession and the local duke's physician in ordinary, had a respectable position in the society becoming the mayor of his hometown. As the family was Protestants, they sent Georg Friedrich to study physics and mathematics at the University of Stuttgart in Stuttgart, the capital of the Duchy (1782–1786).

== Career beginnings ==
For several years after graduation, Parrot took positions as a private tutor in France and Germany, and in 1795 in Livonia, one of the Baltic provinces of the Russian Empire. His reasons for leaving Germany were mainly economic: as he was recently married, he needed a more regular income than he could gain from giving occasional private classes in mathematics and attending to various contests of inventions. His talent was noticed and he was appointed to be the first secretary of the Livonian Charitable and Economic Society (Livländische gemeinnützige und ökonomische Sozietät) founded in 1796 in Riga, the capital of Livonia, for the promotion of science and new ideas of management. At that time, there was no longer a university in the region. Although King Gustavus Adolphus of Sweden had founded the Academia Gustaviana in 1632, it had ceased to exist in 1710 when Peter the Great had conquered the Baltic Sea provinces. Only in 1802 was the university re-founded by the order of the Tsar Alexander I as the only German-language and Lutheran university in the Russian Empire. Parrot was initially appointed to the Chair of Pure and Applied Mathematics but after defending his doctoral dissertation “On the influence of Physics and Chemistry on Pharmacy” (Über den Einfluss den Physic und Chemie auf die Arzneikunde) in 1802, he was appointed to the Chair of Physics.

== Imperial University of Dorpat ==
Due to his extraordinary energy, he became the first rector of the Imperial University of Dorpat (University of Tartu), being elected by the University Council consisting of all chaired professors. In this capacity, Parrot skillfully fought for the academic freedom and the self-government of the university, protecting her from the political pressure of Baltic German barons who had been given the right to autonomously govern in the Baltic provinces. The university was re-opened on the initiative of the local aristocratic establishment but they disliked Parrot for his unconcealed sympathy to the ideals of the Enlightenment. Parrot openly talked about equality of people, irrespective of their social status and heritage. In his inaugural speech at the opening ceremony of the University he said, addressing the students:

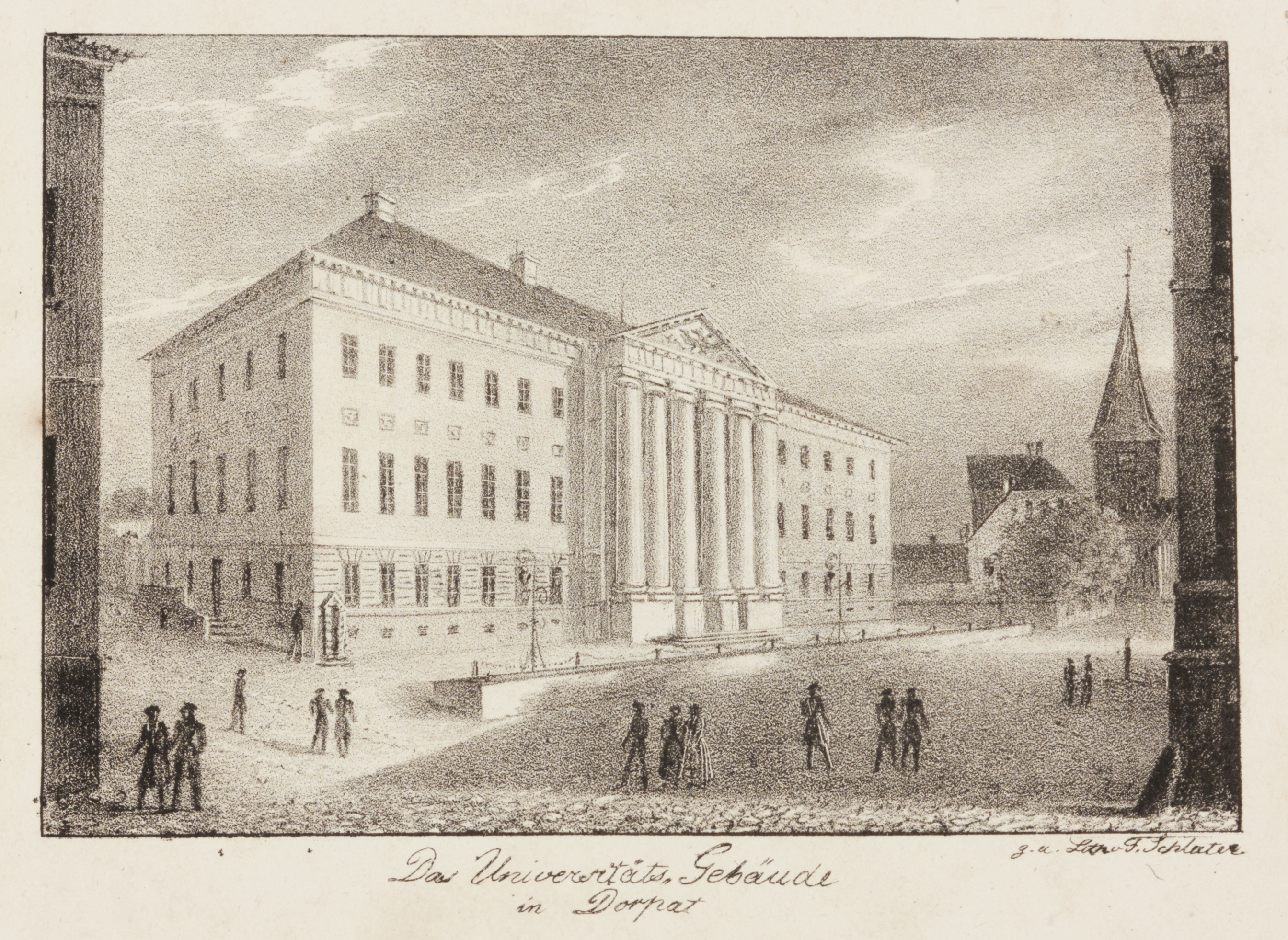
The Imperial University of Dorpat, 1832–1835.

While you are using with a laudatory diligence all that science and art are able to provide for the benefit of your culture, the countryman is working for you on his field; he is devoting his toil for you, working in the hardest conditions all his days, even part of the nights, and because of that he is enforced to fall behind you in his cultural development. [...] You understand that those who feed you are entitled to much more than merely a miserable existence, that they have every right to expect your gratitude, your respect, our gratitude, our respect.

According to the memoirs of Parrot's contemporaries, these words made an inextinguishable impression. However, Parrot's hour of triumph arrived on May 22, 1802. Tsar Alexander I stopped in Dorpat on his way to Memel (Klaipėda) for the meeting with the King Frederick William III of Prussia. Parrot was nominated to give a speech in his honour with which he immediately won the sympathy of the young ambitious Tsar. Appealing to the ideal of enlightened monarchy, Parrot expressed his gratitude to the Tsar who had ordered the reopening of the university, and repeated the promise to honestly serve science and the whole humanity. Alexander was so delighted with Parrot's eloquence that he asked him to prepare a written copy of his speech. This episode laid the foundations of a friendly relationship between the Tsar and Parrot, which lasted for ten years and proved to be extremely beneficial for the University, to say nothing about Parrot himself.

In 1811, Parrot was elected to be a corresponding member of the Imperial Academy of Sciences, becoming a full member in 1826. In the same year, he retired from the University of Dorpat and continued his work as a head of the physics laboratory of the Academy of Sciences in Saint Petersburg. He died on a trip to Helsingfors (Helsinki), in 1852.

The Parrot dynasty left an indelible mark on the history of science in Russia and Estonia. His son, Friedrich Parrot (1791-1841), followed in his father's footsteps, making a career as a naturalist and later assuming the rectorship at the University of Dorpat in 1830. A pioneer of Russian and Estonian scientific mountaineering, he is best known for leading the first expedition to the summit of Mount Ararat in recorded history.

== 250th Anniversary ==
On the occasion of Parrot's upcoming 250th anniversary, University of Tartu purchased Parrot's original rector portrait, thought to have been lost, at an auction. The portrait was revealed at the Old Anatomical Theatre in Tartu in the summer of 2017. The Vanemuine theatre staged the play Anima In Machina. G. F. Parrot in his honour in 2017. Estonian Association of the History and Philosophy of Science (:et) along with the University of Tartu Museum hosted an international three day conference "On the Border of the Russian Empire: German University of Tartu and its first Rector Georg Friedrich Parrot" in his honour.

Preceded by Elof Holstenius	Rector of the Imperial University of Dorpat; 1802–1803	Succeeded by Daniel Georg Balk
Preceded by Adam Christian Gaspari	Rector of the Imperial University of Dorpat; 1805–1806	Succeeded by Carl Friedrich Meyer
Preceded by David Hieronymus Grindel	Rector of the Imperial University of Dorpat; 1812–1813	Succeeded by Martin Ernst von Styx
