= Toomas Asser =

Estonian neurologist

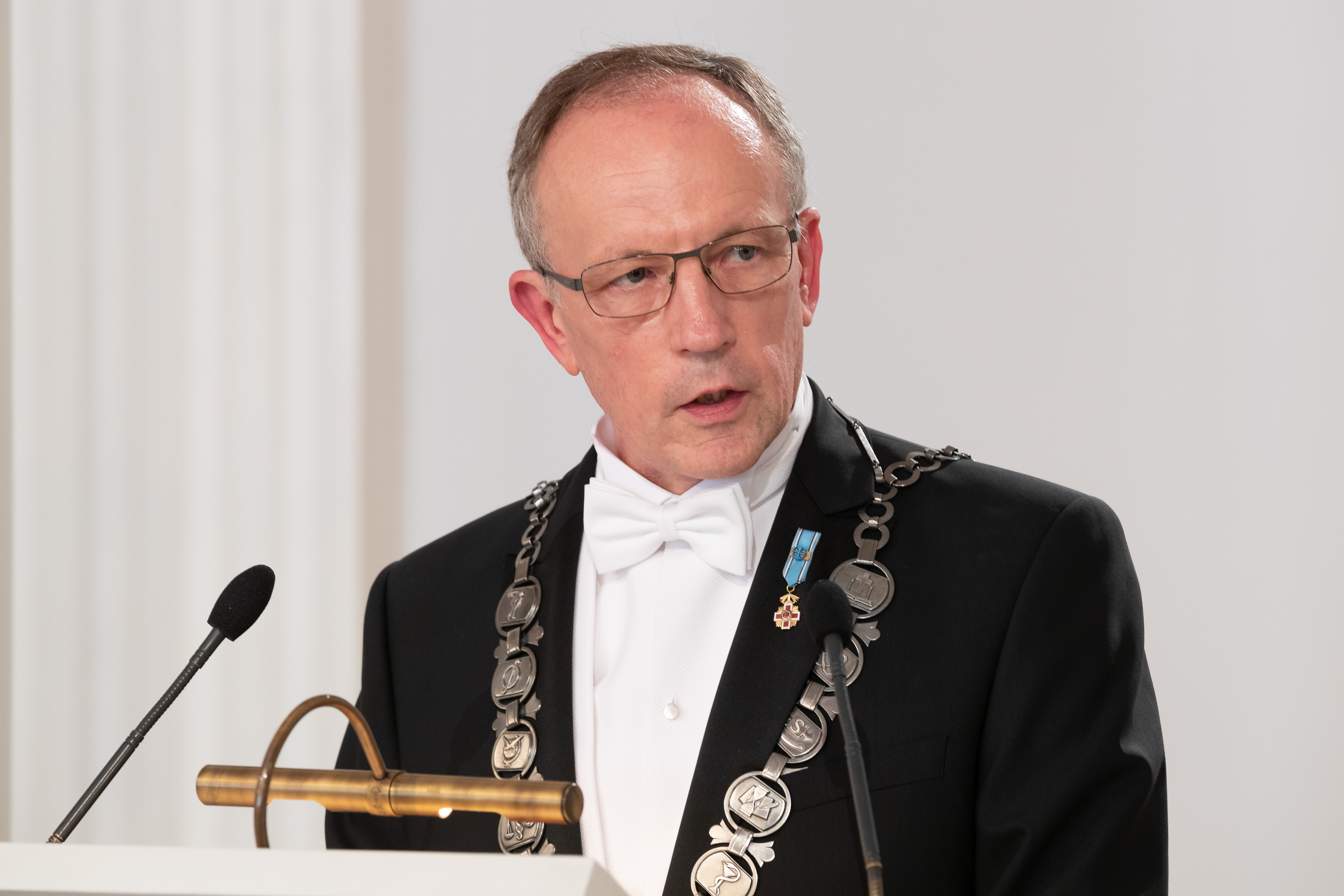
- Born: July 14, 1954

Toomas Asser (born 14 July 1954 in Jõhvi) is an Estonian medical scientist. He has been a member of the Estonian Academy of Sciences since 2011 and the Rector of the University of Tartu since 1 August 2018. His research focuses on clinical and molecular-biological aspects of brain tumors, pituitary surgery, surgical treatment of intracranial aneurysms, functional surgery (deep brain stimulation for Parkinson's disease) and spinal cord injuries.

== Education and career ==
Asser graduated from Nõo Secondary School (1973) and the Faculty of Medicine of Tartu State University in 1979. In 1987, Asser defended his PhD in Medicine at Moscow N. Burdenko Institute of Neurosurgery with his candidate’s dissertation on cerebral blood flow regulation issues and stereotactic operations using the original thermocautery. Between 1988−1989, Asser trained at the Institute of Brain Diseases of Tohoku University in Japan.

Between 1979 and 1989, he was the Assistant at the Neurology Clinic of Tartu State University and the Associate Professor of Neurology between 1989 and 1985. Since 1995, Asser has been Professor of Neurosurgery of the University of Tartu.

From 1996 to 2018, Asser was the Head of Department of Neurology and Neurosurgery of Tartu University Hospital and from 2000 to 2009 also the Dean of University of Tartu Faculty of Medicine.

On 26 April 2018, Toomas Asser was elected the Rector of the University of Tartu at extraordinary elections.

In 2011, he was elected as a member of the Estonian Academy of Sciences in medical science. He belongs to the academy’s Division of Biology, Geology and Chemistry and has been the head of this division since 2014.

He belongs to the standing committee on medical science and health strategy of the Estonian Academy of Sciences.

He is also Vice-Chair of The Guild (The Guild of European Research-Intensive Universities) and President of Universities Estonia.

== Recognition ==
- 1997 Tohoku University Medal
- 2009 Medal of the University of Tartu Faculty of Medicine
- 2009 Badge of honour of the Estonian Medical Association
- 2011 Special recognition diploma of the World Cultural Council
- 2013 Order of the Estonian Red Cross, 1st class
- 2014 University of Tartu Grand Medal
- 2019 Latvian Cross of Recognition, 3rd class (Commander)
