= Karl Christian Ulmann =

Baltic German theologian (1793–1871)

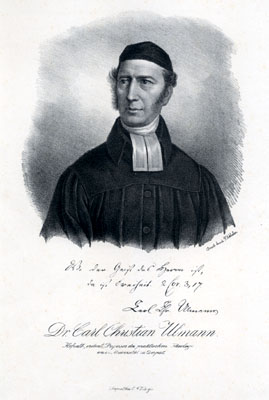
Karl Christian Ulmann (1793-1871)

Karl Christian Ulmann (14 February [O.S. 3 February] 1793, Riga – 20 October [O.S. 8 October] 1871, Walk) was a Baltic German theologian.

From 1810 to 1814, he studied theology at the Imperial University of Dorpat (now University of Tartu), then continued his education at the universities of Jena and Göttingen. From 1817 to 1834, he served as pastor at St. Peters Capelle-Kremon. From 1835 to 1842, he was a professor of theology at Dorpat, where in 1839-1841 he was university rector. In 1844 he returned to Riga as an officer of the Livland Oberlandschulbehörde.

In 1856 he was named vice-president of the Evangelical Lutheran General Consistorium in St. Petersburg, later being appointed Bischofswurde (March 1858).

== Selected writings ==
- Sammlung geistlicher Lieder für Gemeindegenossen der evangelisch-lutherischen Kirchen, 1843 - Collection of spiritual songs for the evangelical Lutheran church.
- Das gegewartige Verhältnis der evangelischen Brudergemeinde zur evangelisch-lutherischen Kirche in Liv- und Ehstland, 1862 - Current ratio involving the evangelical brotherhood to the evangelical Lutheran church in Livland and Estonia.
- 'Lettisches wörterbuch, 1872 Latvian dictionary.
- Deutsch-lettisches Wörterbuch, 1880 - German-Latvian dictionary.
