= Aleksandr Filippov (philosopher) =

Aleksandr Pavlovich Filippov (born 1891) was a Russian philosopher.

Filippov completed his training for the law at the University of Kharkiv in 1913. He then devoted four years to the study of natural sciences at that university. He held a research fellowship in European culture at the university and worked as a scientific fellow of the Ukrainian Academy of Sciences.

In 1942 Filippov was appointed Professor of Philosophy at the University of Kharkiv. A year later he became Professor of Sociology at Charles University in Prague. From 1945 to 1952 he lived in Munich. There, in addition to working as a consultant for the Harvard University Refugee Interview Project he was chairman of the editorial committee of the Institute for the Study of the History and Institutions of the USSR.

Filippov published extensively on psychology, philosophy and Bolshevik theory and practice.

== Bibliography ==
Philipov, Alexander, Logic and Dialectic in the Soviet Union, New York: Research Program on the USSR, 1952 (with a foreword by Ernest Nagel)
