= Alexander Julius Klünder =

Baltic German painter

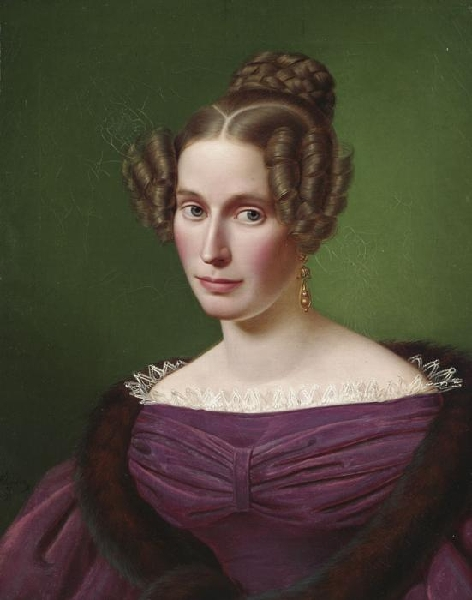
Portrait of a Woman with a Biedermeier Hairstyle (1838)

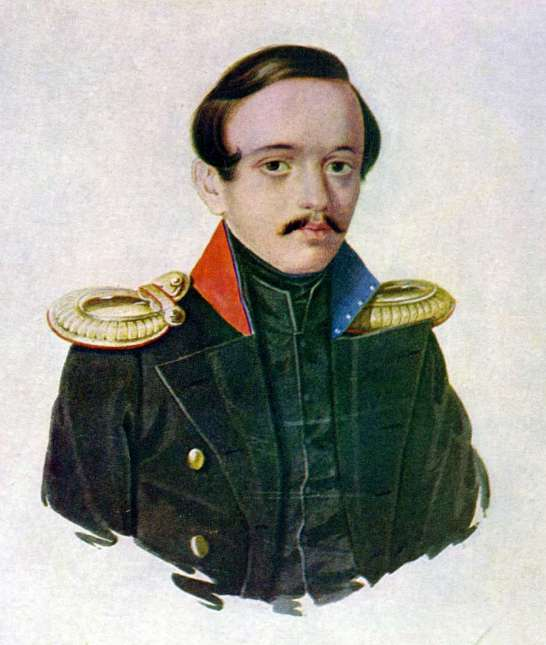
Miniature of Mikhail Lermontov (1839)

Alexander Julius Klünder (Russian: Александр Иванович Клюндер; 20 February 1802, Tallinn – 8 January 1875, Tallinn) was a Baltic-German painter and lithographer, known primarily for his portraits.

== Biography ==
His father was a tailor. After attending the public schools, he studied economics at the Imperial University of Dorpat (now the University of Tartu) from 1823 to 1826. At the same time, he pursued what would prove to be his true interests by studying at an art school operated by Karl August Senff. At that time, he created his first significant portrait, that of the newly graduated Friedrich Robert Faehlmann, who would later become a prominent physician and philologist.

After completing his studies, he worked as a freelance artist and art teacher. In 1827, on the 25th anniversary of the University's reopening, he was commissioned to paint portraits of notable professors; a project which kept him occupied until 1829. After its completion, he moved to Saint Petersburg, where he devoted himself exclusively to portraiture, mostly miniatures.

He proved to be very successful there; in 1834, he was awarded the title of "free artist" and, in 1839, he became an Agrégé. Two years later, he was named an Academician and was elected a member of the Imperial Academy of Arts.

In addition to portraits of the Imperial Family, other members of the nobility, and the government, his sitters notably included Mikhail Lermontov and the painter Karl Bryullov. He was also commissioned to paint a series of about 60 portraits depicting members of the Chevalier Guard Regiment, which he worked on until 1850. Later, he did a series devoted to historical military clothing and weapons.

After becoming ill and retiring, he returned to Tallinn and spent his final years there.
