= Grigori Levitski =

Russian astronomer

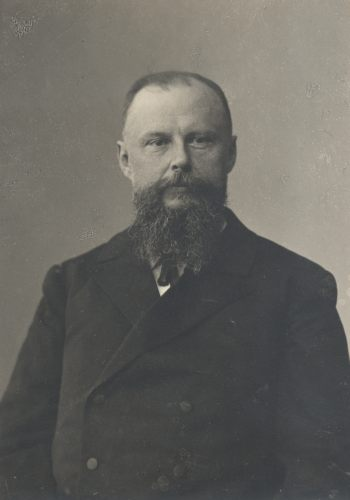
- Grigori Levitski in 1890
- Born: 27 October 1852; Kharkiv
- Died: 26 October 1918 (aged 65); St. Petersburg
- Education: St. Petersburg University
- Scientific career
- Fields: Astronomy
- Workplaces: Pulkovo Observatory; Imperial Kharkov University; University of Yuryev; Tartu Observatory; Women's Pedagogical Institute

Grigori Levitski (27 October 1852 Kharkiv – 26 October 1918 St. Petersburg) was a Russian astronomer.

In 1879 he graduated from St. Petersburg University. His dissertation was entitled "On the Determination of Orbits of Double Stars". In 1880s he worked at Pulkovo Observatory. He then directed Kharkiv Observatory from 1883 to 1894; he was succeeded by Ludwig von Struve.

From 1894 to 1908 he was the head of Tartu Observatory. During 1901-1905 he was the president of Estonian Naturalists' Society. From 1903 to 1905 he was also the rector of the Imperial University of Dorpat.

From 1915 he was the chairman of Russian Astronomical Society.

== Works ==
- On the existence of a resisting medium in celestial space (1877)
- On a method for determining polar heights (1891)
- The Histories of the Observatories of Kharkov and Tartu (1894, 1899)
- The Lexicon of Professors of Tartu University (1902-1903)
