= David Hieronymus Grindel =

Botanist, chemist and pharmacist (1776–1836)

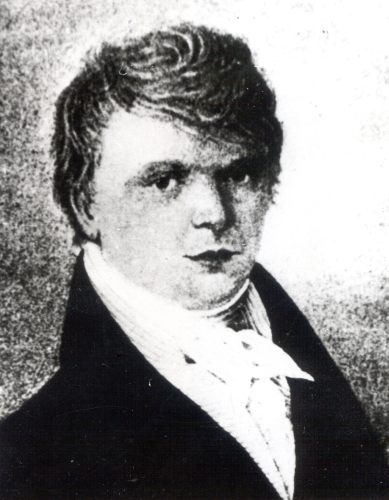
Fo3395 3b david hieronymus grindel

David Hieronymus Grindel (1776–1836) was a botanist (bryologist).

Plant genus Grindelia is named after the botanist.
