= Christian Friedrich Neue =

German classical philologist (1799–1886)

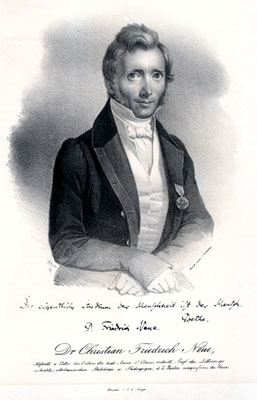
Christian Friedrich Neue (1799-1886)

Christian Friedrich Neue (19 December 1799, Spandau – 14 July 1886, Stuttgart) was a German classical philologist.

He obtained his education in Berlin as a student of philologist August Boeckh. Beginning in 1820, he taught classes at Schulpforta. From 1831 to 1861, he was a professor of classical philology at the Imperial University of Dorpat, where for several years he served as university rector (1836–1839, 1843–1851).

== Written works ==
His major work involving morphology of the Latin language, Formenlehre der lateinischen Sprache, was released in four volumes. He was also the author of scholarly editions of works by the lyric poets Bacchylides and Sappho.

- "Bacchylidis Cei Fragmenta", 1822.
- "Sapphonis Mytilenaeae fragmenta : specimen operae in omnibus artis Graecorum lyricae reliquiis excepto Pindaro collocandae", 1827.
- Formenlehre der lateinischen Sprache (4 volumes, third edition 1892-1905) - Morphology of the Latin language.
  - Volume 1. Das Substantivum.
  - Volume 2. Adjectiva, Numeralia, Pronomina, Adverbis, Präpositionen, Konjunktionen, Interjektionen.
  - Volume 3. Das Verbum.
  - Volume 4. Register mit Zusätzen und Verbesserungen.
