= University of Tartu =

Public university in Tartu, Estonia

- Tartu Ülikool
- Latin: Universitas Tartuensis
- Former names: Academia Gustaviana, Academia Pernaviensis, University of Dorpat/Yuryev, Tartu State University
- Type: Public
- Established: 1632; 394 years ago (closed: 1665–1690; 336 years ago, 1710–1802; 224 years ago)
- Founder: King Gustavus Adolphus of Sweden
- Affiliations: CBUR, EUA, Coimbra Group, Utrecht Network, Atomium Culture; Guild of European Research-Intensive Universities
- Budget: €264 million (2024)
- Rector: Toomas Asser
- Faculty: 2,001
- Administrative staff: 1,538
- Students: 15,573
- Undergraduates: 9,815
- Postgraduates: 4,580
- Doctoral students: 1,178
- Location: Tartu, Estonia; 58°22′52″N 26°43′13″E
- Campus: Urban (University town)
- Colours: White; Blue
- Nicknames: UT, unitartu
- Mascot: Tiksu
- Website: ut.ee

The University of Tartu (Estonian: Tartu Ülikool) is a public research university in Tartu, Estonia. It is the national university of Estonia, as well as the largest and oldest university in the country.

The university was founded in 1632 by Gustavus Adolphus, at the time the king of Sweden.

Currently, 15,573 students study at the university, of whom 1,435 are foreigners (9%). Most of the curriculum is instructed in Estonian. There are also 30 programmes taught in English: three at the undergraduate level and 27 at the master's level, including the Erasmus Mundus programme in Excellence in Analytical Chemistry.

The historical buildings of the university are included in the European Heritage Label list as "embodiment of the ideas of a university in the Age of Enlightenment". The university is a member of the Coimbra Group and the Utrecht Network.

The mascot of the university is a blue bird called Tiksu.

== History ==
=== Academia Gustaviana ===
The foundation act of the new university in Dorpat (Tartu) was signed on 30 June 1632 by King Gustavus Adolphus of Sweden who was leading a military campaign in Germany at the time, a few months before his death in the Battle of Lützen (16 November 1632). The first chancellor of the university (called alternatively Academia Dorpatensis after its location, or Academia Gustaviana after the founding king) was Baron Johan Skytte (1577–1645), the governor-general of the Swedish provinces of Livonia, Ingria, and Karelia.

The university founded in Tartu in 1632 was at the time the third oldest university in the entire Kingdom of Sweden, following the University of Greifswald in Swedish Pomerania and Uppsala University (in Uppsala, Sweden proper), and preceding the Academy of Åbo (now Turku, Finland). A precursor to the academy had been a Jesuit grammar school Gymnasium Dorpatense, founded by Stefan Batory (then king of Poland–Lithuania) in 1583 and existing to 1601, when Tartu (Dorpat) was under Polish–Lithuanian rule.

The first students matriculated between 20 and 21 April 1632. The opening ceremony of Academia Gustaviana took place on 15 October in the same year. The academy in Tartu functioned with philosophy, law, theology, and medical faculties enjoying the privileges of the University of Uppsala. After the outbreak of the Russo–Swedish war of 1656–1658, the university was moved from Tartu to Tallinn. It was closed down in 1665, only to be re-opened in Tartu again in 1690.

In the 17th century, the future outstanding Swedish scholars Urban Hiärne, Olof Verelius, Arvid Moller, and others studied at the university. Among the academic staff were Friedrich Menius, professor of history (the history of Livonia, the first scientific approach to Estonian folklore) and Georg Mancelius, professor of theology (author of the first Latvian-German dictionary in 1638).

=== Academia Gustavo-Carolina ===
With the re-opening of the university in 1690 (renamed Academia Gustavo-Carolina) Tartu became a university town again. Academic staff of the new university included Sven Dimberg, professor of mathematics (the first in the world to deliver lectures based on Newton's theory), Olof Hermelin, professor of rhetoric and poetry, Lars Micrander, professor of medicine (founder of balneology, and discoverer of natural mineral water springs) and Michael Dau, professor of philosophy as well as of rhetoric and poetry. Just under a decade after being reconstituted, as a result of the coalition against Sweden (Russia, Denmark-Norway, and Saxony-Poland-Lithuania) and the Great Famine of 1695–1697, the university moved from Tartu to Pernau (Pärnu) and renamed Academia Pernaviensis. Eventually, Academia Gustavo-Carolina, which had opened in Pärnu on 28 August 1699, was closed as a result of the surrender of the city to the invading army of the Tsardom of Muscovy on 12 August 1710 during the Great Northern War. Albeit according to the terms of capitulation, the Russian tsar Peter I agreed to maintain the university in Pärnu, the university was closed for the following 92 years. It was able to reopen only in 1802, when its new charter was confirmed by Emperor Alexander I of Russia.

=== Universität Dorpat ===
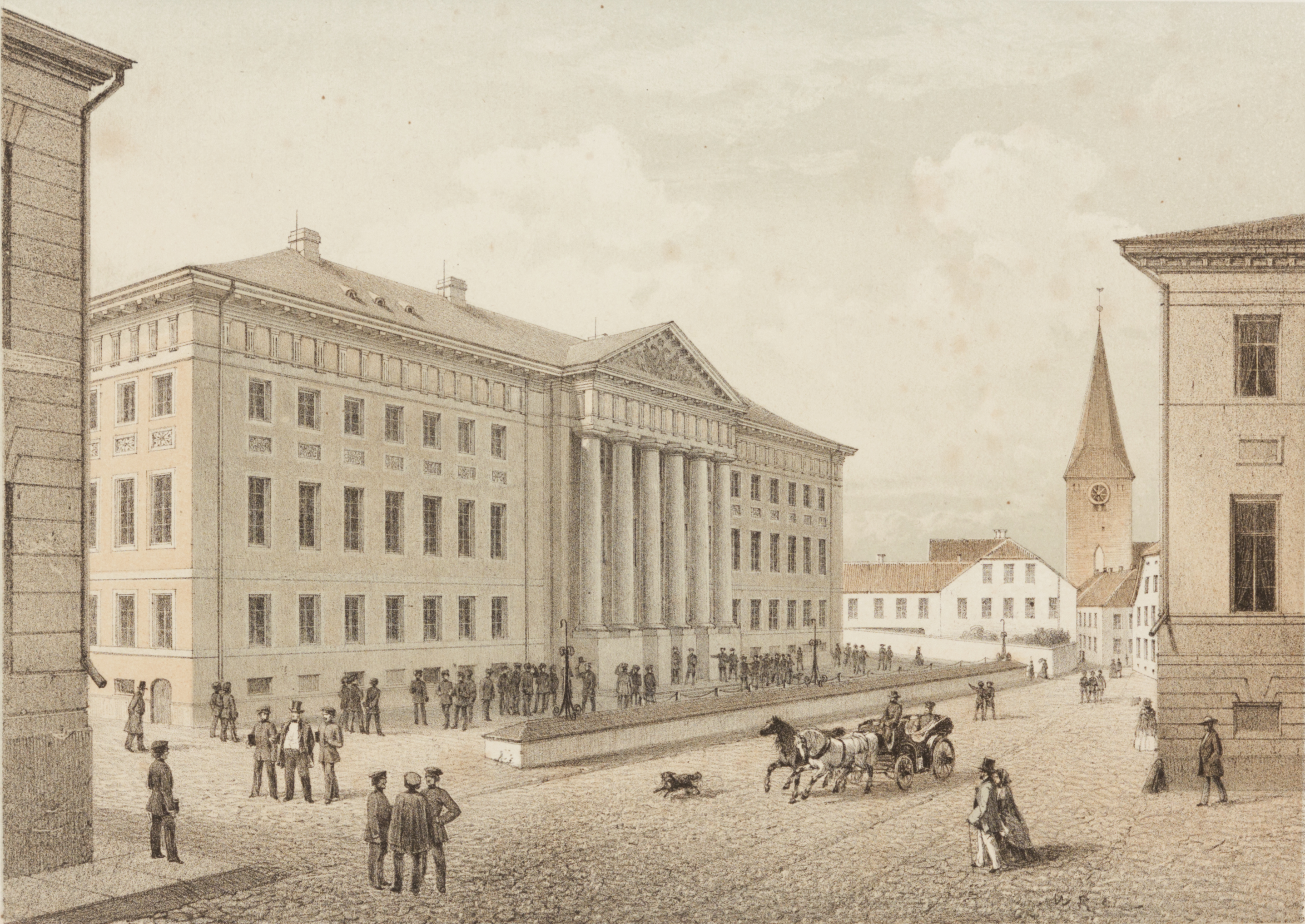
The university in 1860, during its 'Golden Age'.

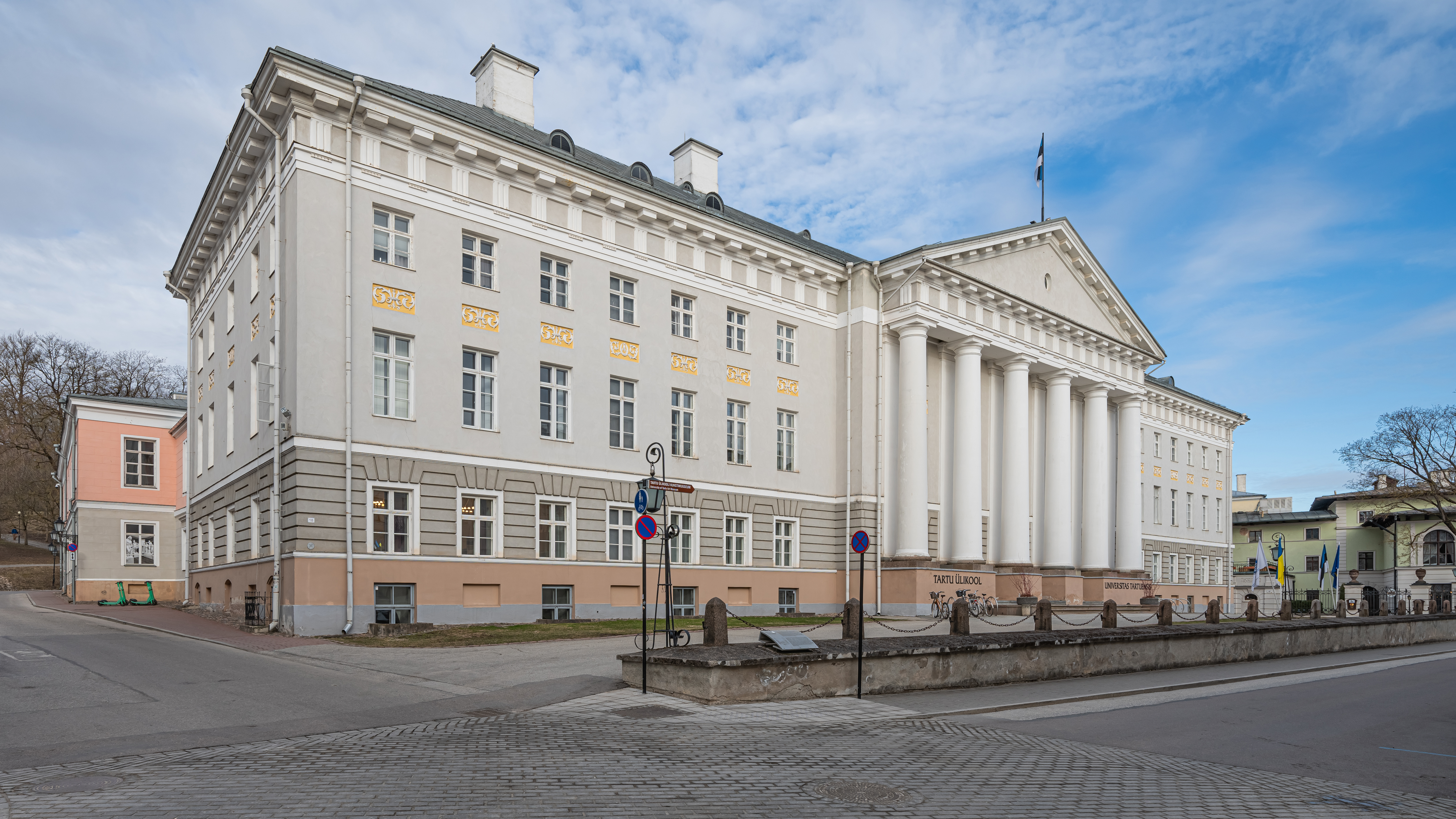
Main building of the University of Tartu constructed between 1804 and 1809.

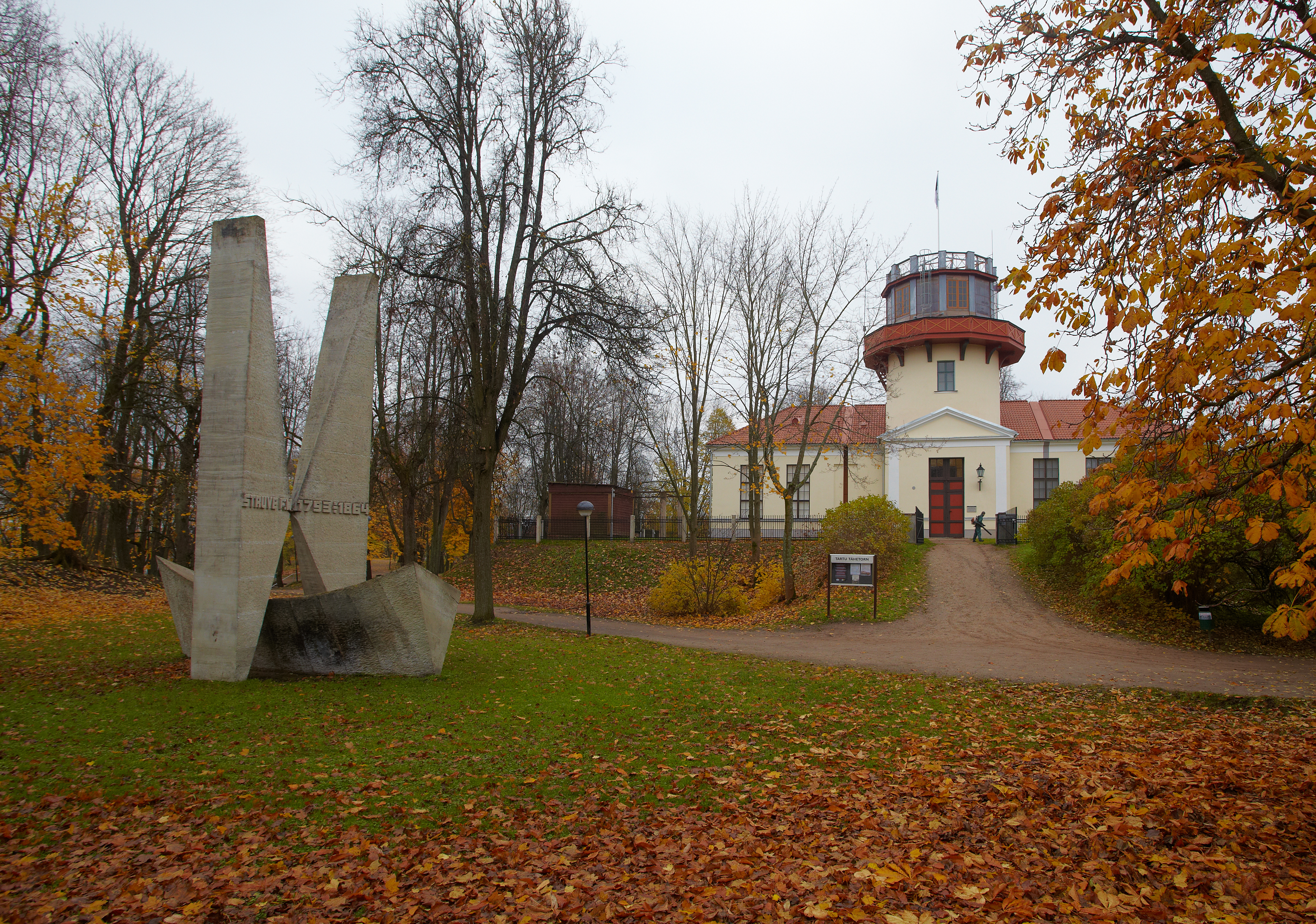
The old observatory with the monument to Friedrich Georg Wilhelm von Struve .

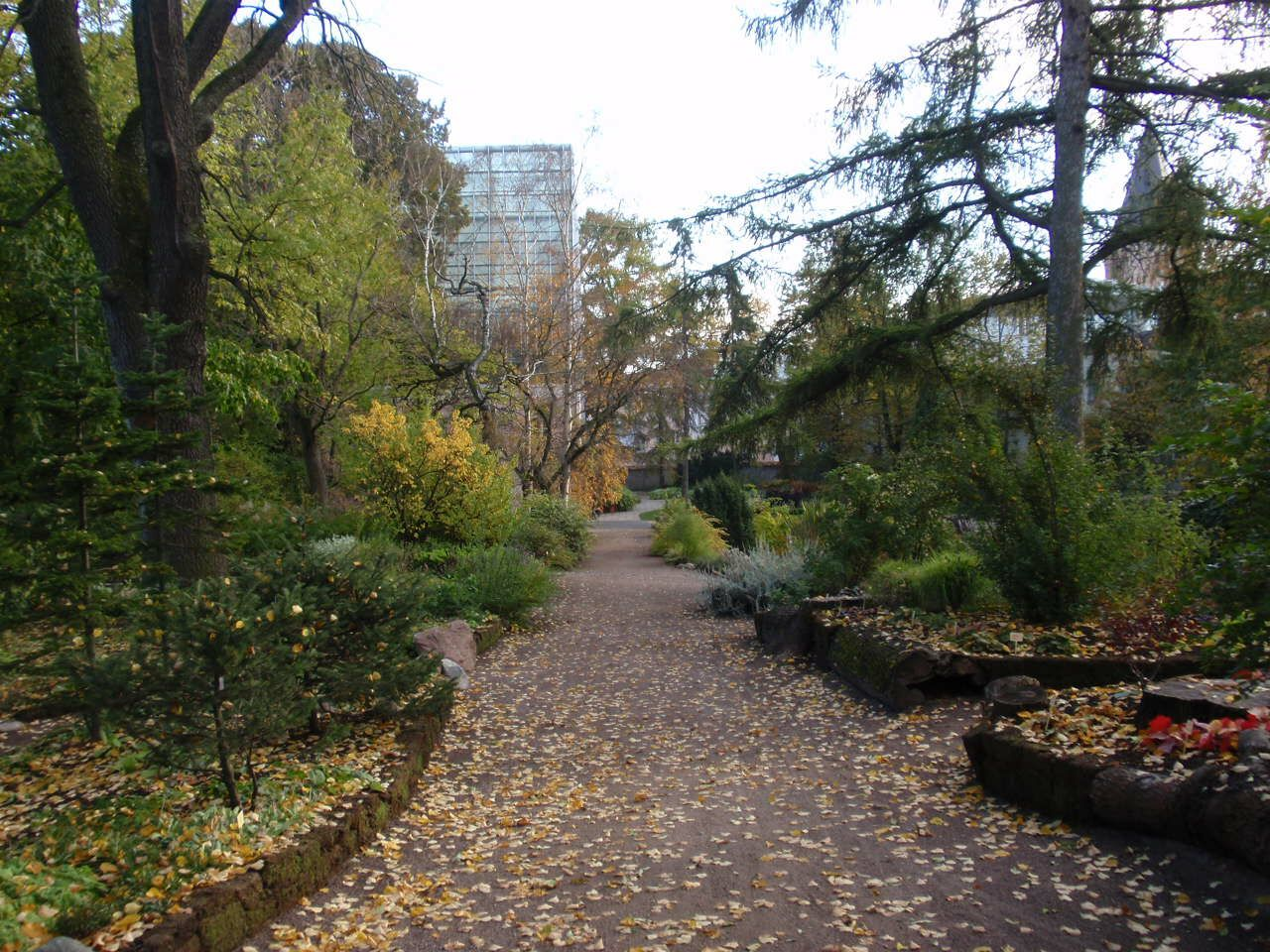
The Botanical Garden was founded by Gottfried Albrecht Germann in 1803.

The university was relaunched by the leaders of local Baltic German nobility and officially opened in April 1802. The charter of Universität Dorpat, the first German-speaking university in the entire Russian Empire, was confirmed by the reform-minded Tsar Alexander I of Russia. Georg Friedrich Parrot was a prominent organiser and rector during the reopening of the university. The language of instruction at the university was German from 1802 to 1893. During that time, Dorpat had a dual nature in that it belonged both to the set of German(-language) and Russian universities. Financially and administratively, the latter was more important; intellectually and regarding the professoriate and students, the former was more important (over half the professors came from Germany, at least another third were local Baltic Germans). Among the 30 German-language universities, of which 23 were inside the German Empire, Dorpat was the 11th in size. In teaching, the university educated the local Baltic German aristocrats and professional classes, as well as staff, especially for the administration and health system of the entire Russian Empire. In scholarship, it was an international university; the time between 1860 and 1880 was its "golden age".

The freedom to be a half-German university ceased with the rise of nationalist tendencies in Russia, which held homogenization more important than retaining a bilingual university. Between 1882 and 1898, russification in language, appointments, etc., was imposed, with some exceptions (such as the Divinity School, which the state feared would be used by the Orthodox clergy to teach dangerous Protestant views and was thus allowed to continue in German until 1916). By 1898, when both the town and the university were renamed Yuryev, virtually all distinguished scholars from Germany had left. The University of Yuryev existed until 1918, when during part of the fall term, it was reopened, under German occupation, as Dorpat. Russian academic staff and students took refuge in Voronezh in Russia, giving rise to the foundation of Voronezh State University, which traces its own history back to the foundation of the University of Tartu and still holds several physical properties of the latter.

=== University of Tartu (1919–) ===
After Estonia became an independent country in 1918, the University of Tartu has been an Estonian-language institution since 1919. The university was named Ostland-Universität in Dorpat during the German occupation of Estonia in 1941–1944 and Tartu State University (Estonian: Tartu Riiklik Ülikool) in 1940–1941 and 1944–1989, during the Soviet occupation. During Soviet rule, although Estonian remained the principal language of instruction, some courses were taught in Russian, with several Russian curricula. Estonia regained independence in 1991, and the full recovery of academic autonomy of the university can be dated to 1992 with the introduction of financial and academic strategic planning. Presently, no courses are taught in Russian.

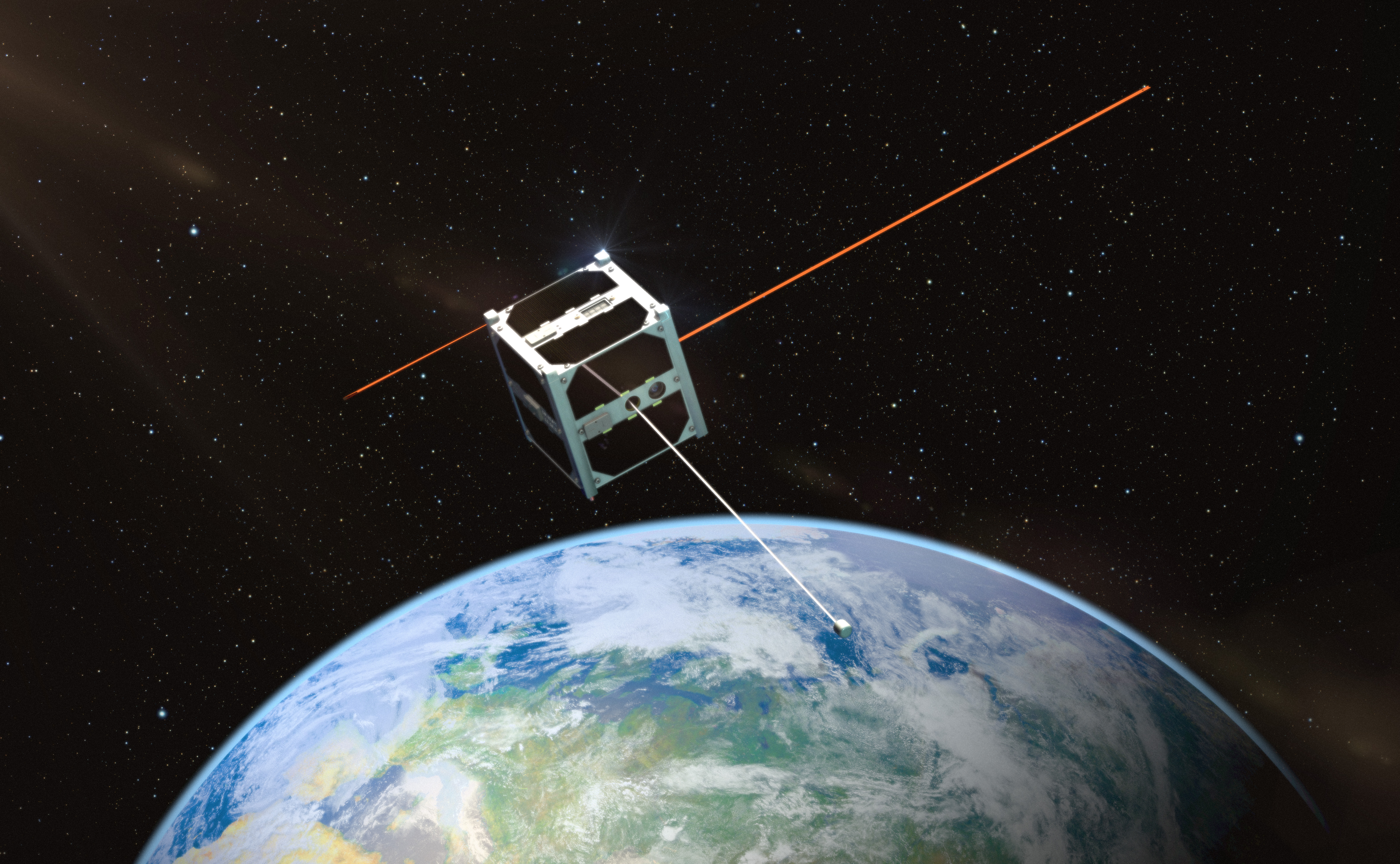
The first Estonian satellite ESTCube-1 was developed mainly by the students from the University of Tartu.

The last decade has been marked by organizational and structural changes, as well as adaptations to various university models (American, Scandinavian, German) against the background of the Soviet and Baltic German past. Most recently, the university has been and is still being marked by the adaptation of the Bologna declaration in Estonia generally and Tartu specifically, leading to major changes in curricula and studies, as well as by strong organizational centralization attempts. Recent plans also include the abolition of the Chair system (an Americanization) and of the faculties, which is supposed to lead to four large divisions (humanities, social sciences, natural sciences, and medicine) under briefly serving deans and rector-appointed financial administrators.

== Buildings ==
Drone video of University of Tartu main building in December 2021

The university's four museums, botanical gardens, and sports facilities are, by and large, open to the general public. The university possesses 56 buildings, 11 of which are outside of Tartu; 31 of its buildings decorate the city as architectural monuments. In May 2023, the University of Tartu relaunched its virtual tour that has 360-degree photos of over 160 locations in the university campus.

At the same time, numerous university buildings and student dormitories have been recently constructed or renovated, such as the Von Bock House. Many of the new buildings are built at Maarjamõisa (about 2 km southwest of the historical university centre), such as the Technology Institute, the Biomedical Center, the Chemistry building, and the new Physics building. The Delta building was built in the city center.

=== Gallery ===
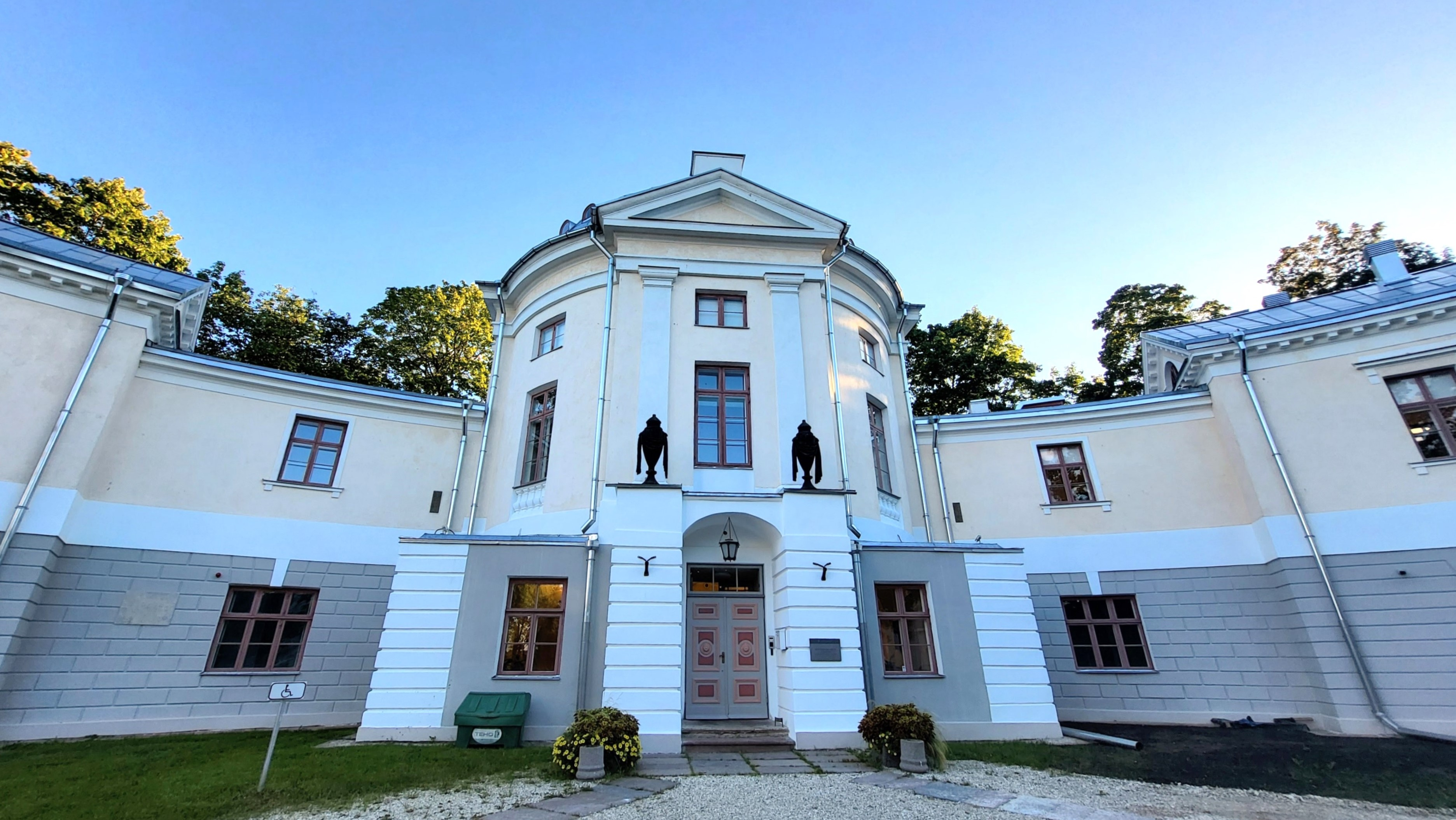
The Old Anatomical Theatre (1805)

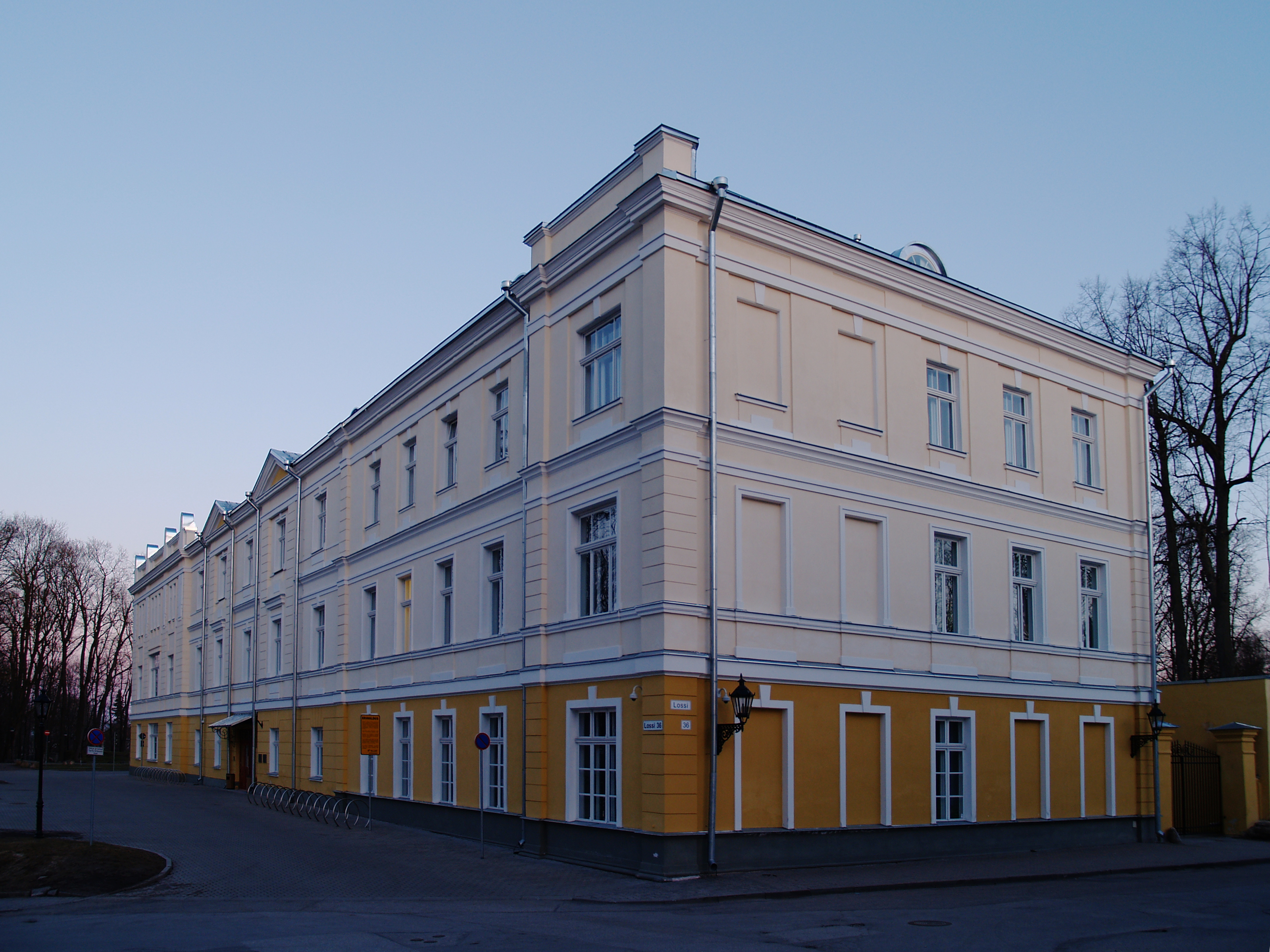
Faculty of Social Sciences

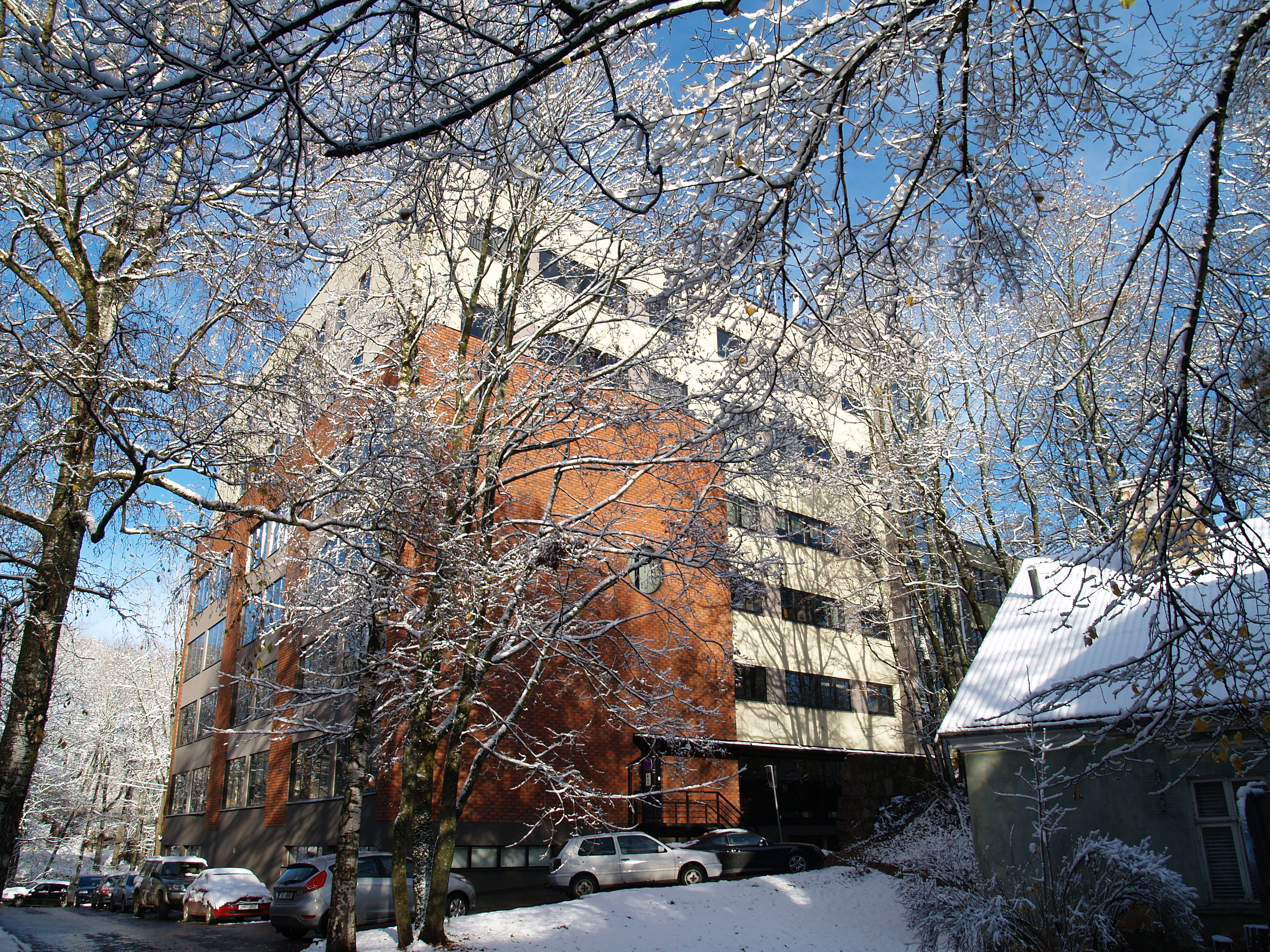
Institute of Mathematics and Statistics

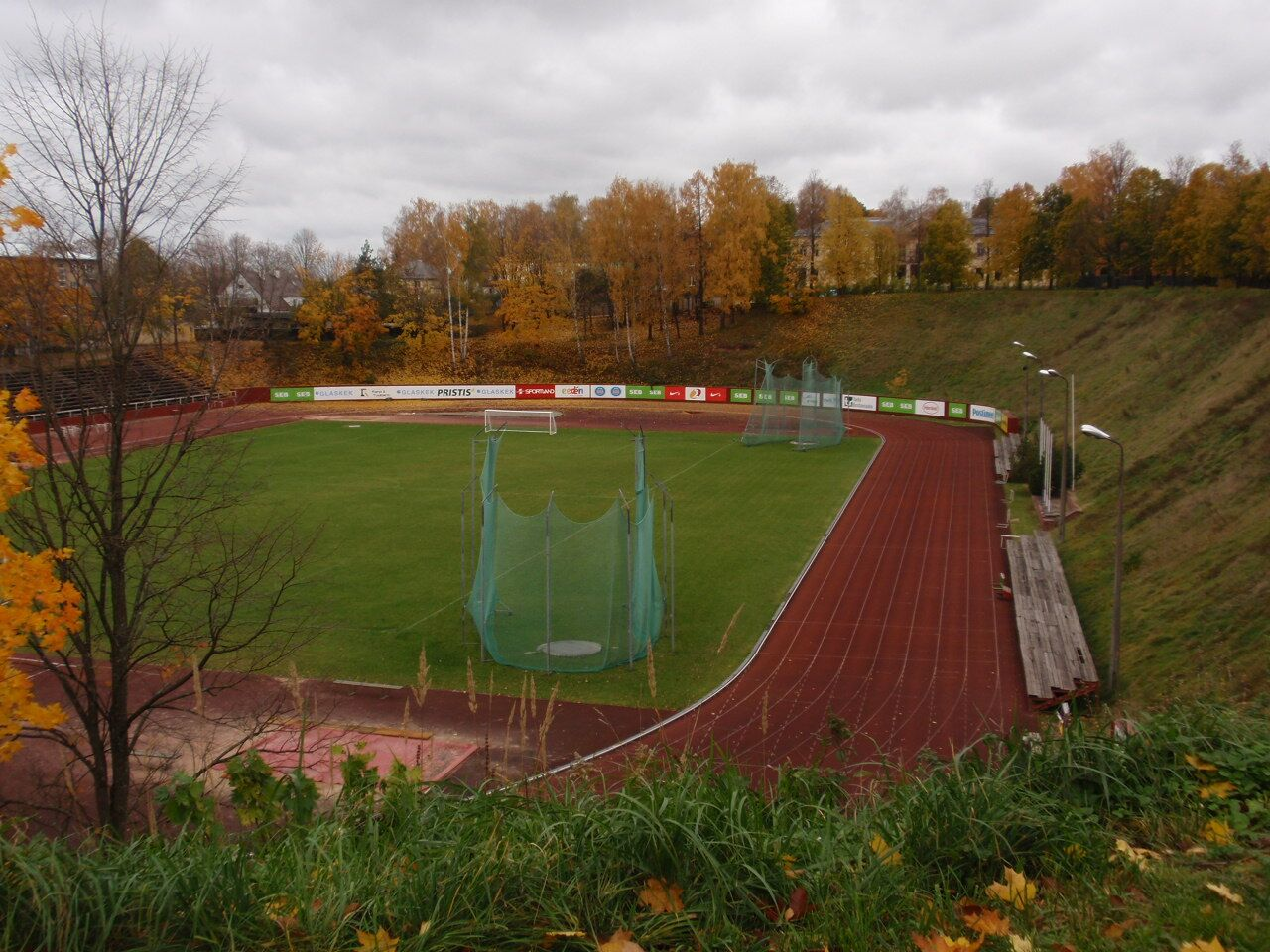
University track and field

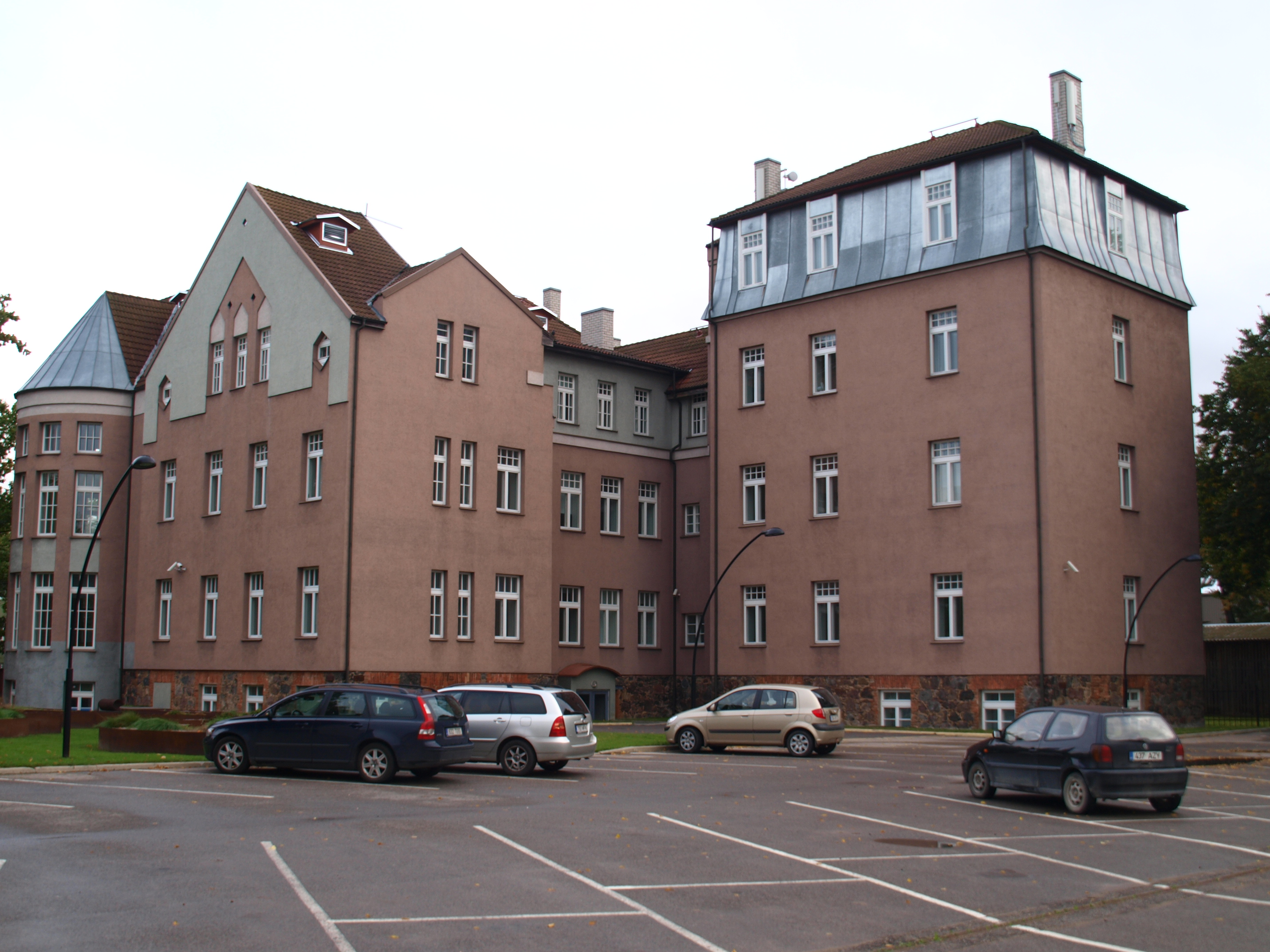
Iuridicum, law building

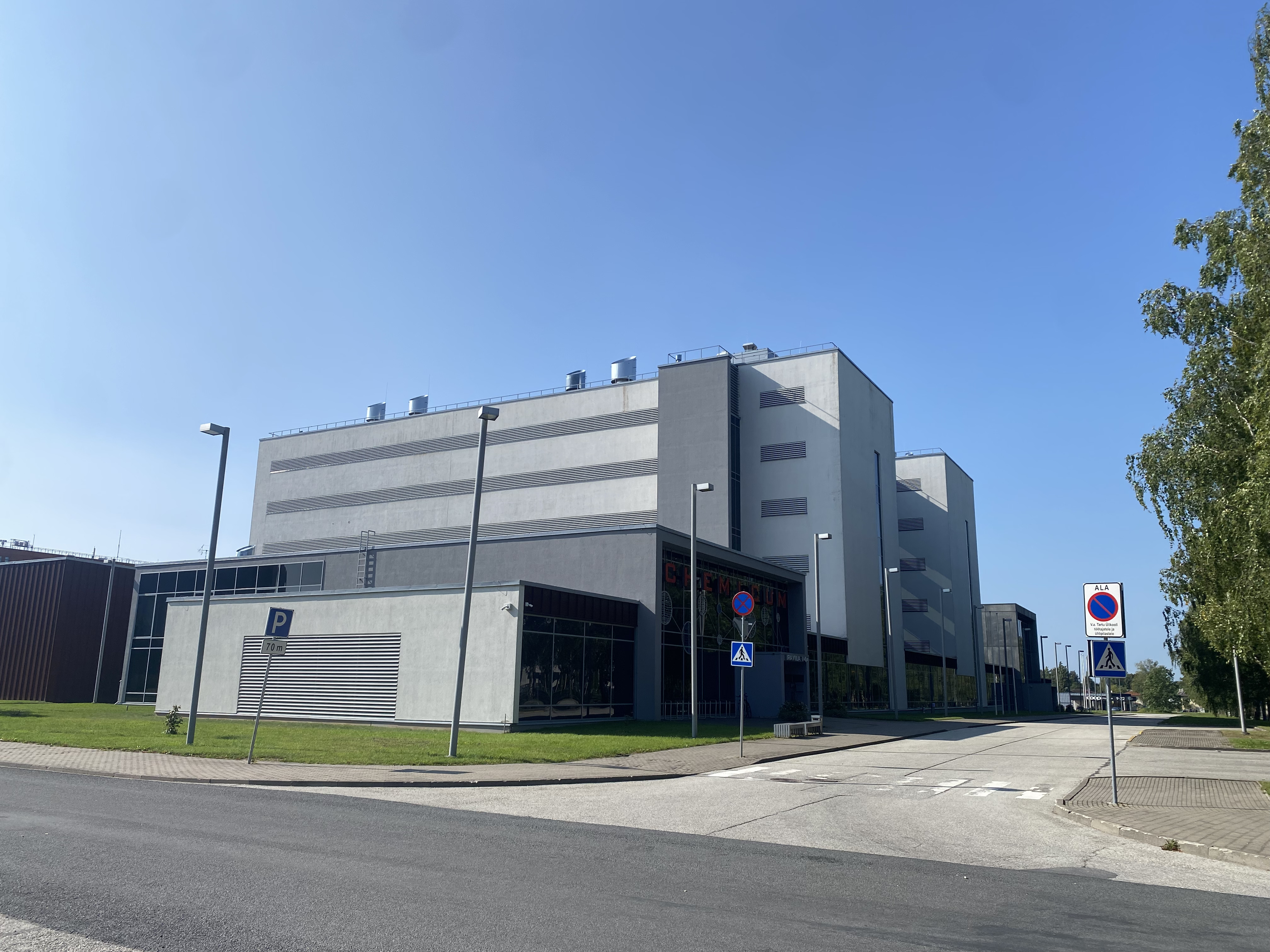
Chemicum

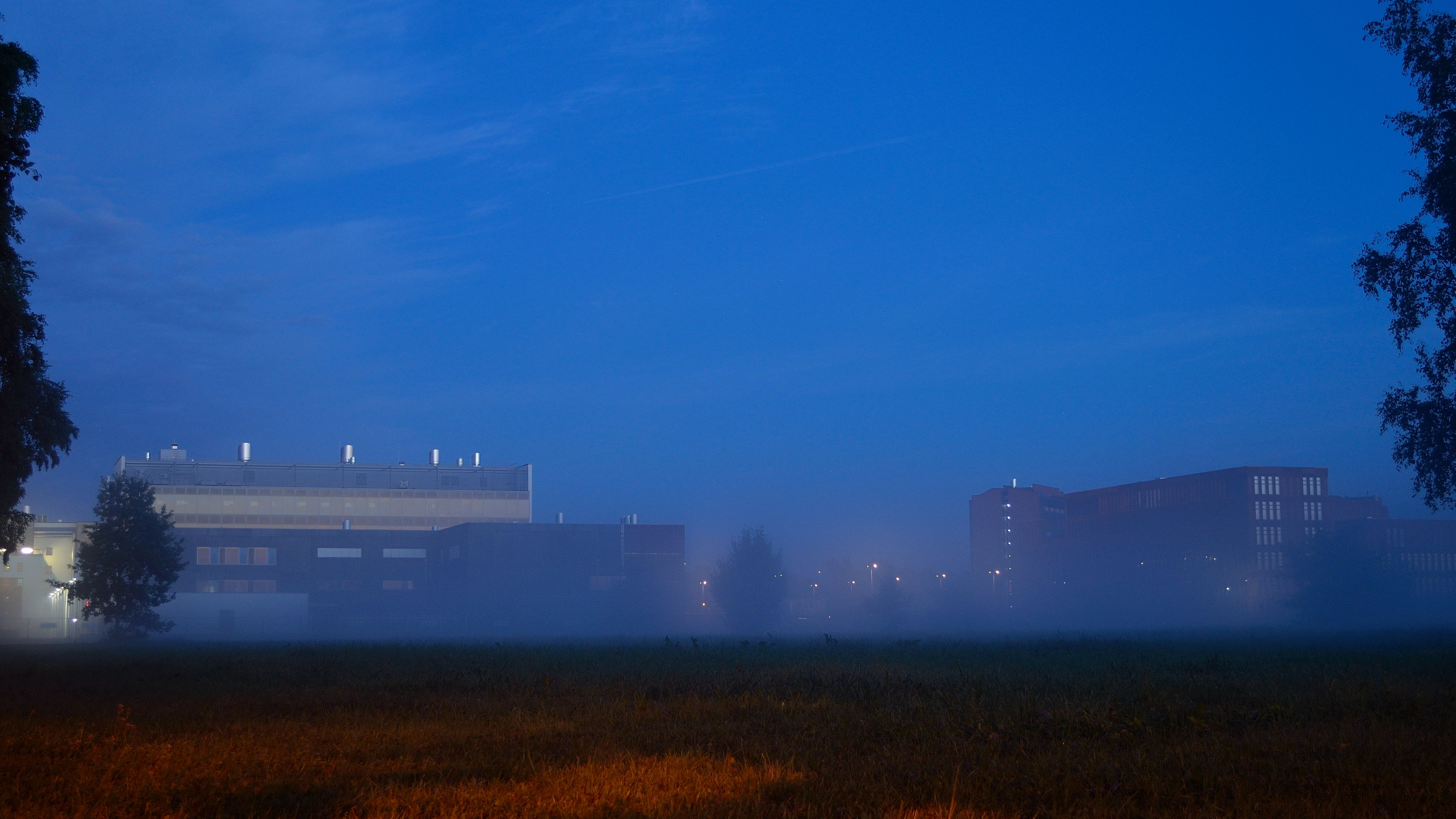
Chemicum and Physicum

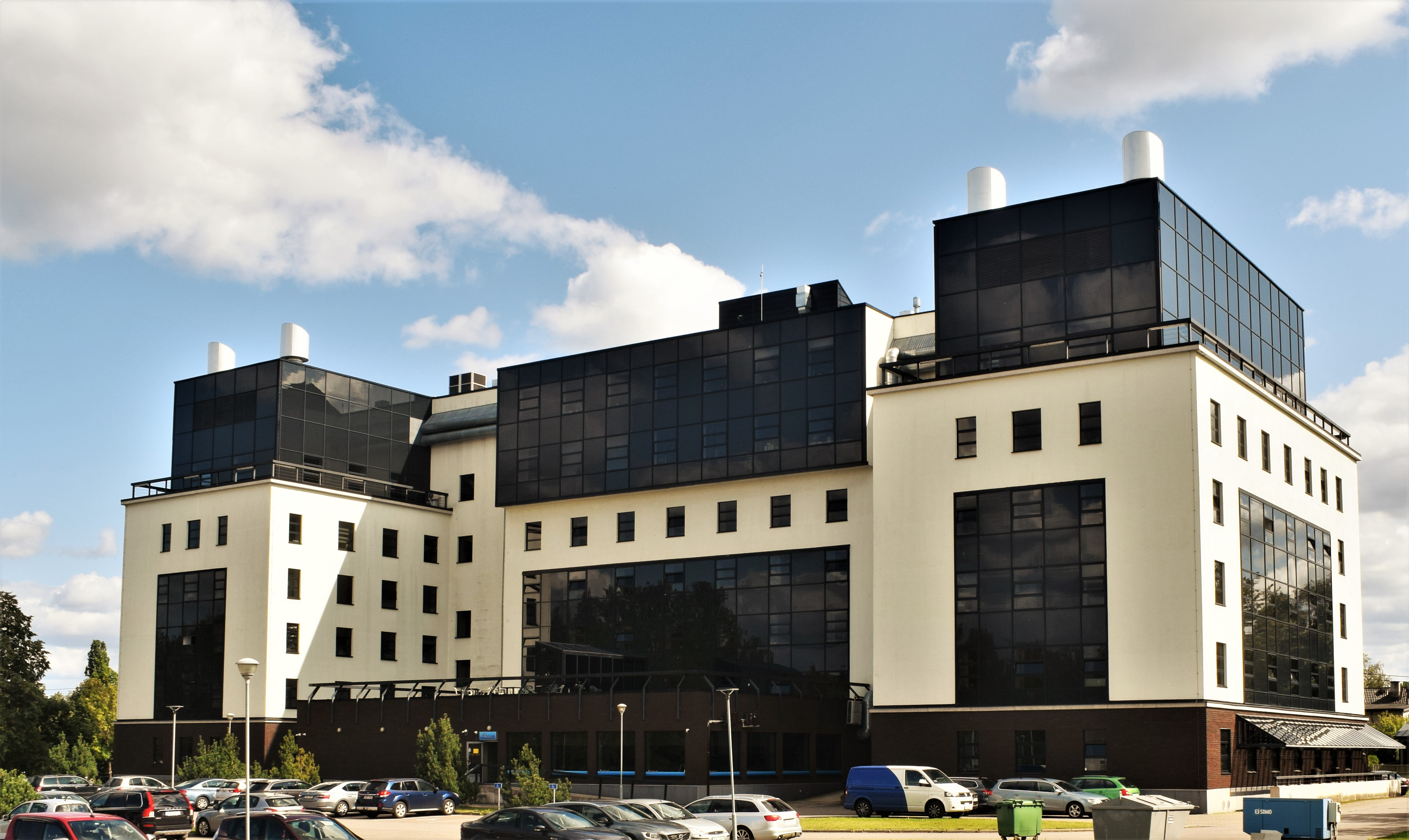
Institute of Technology

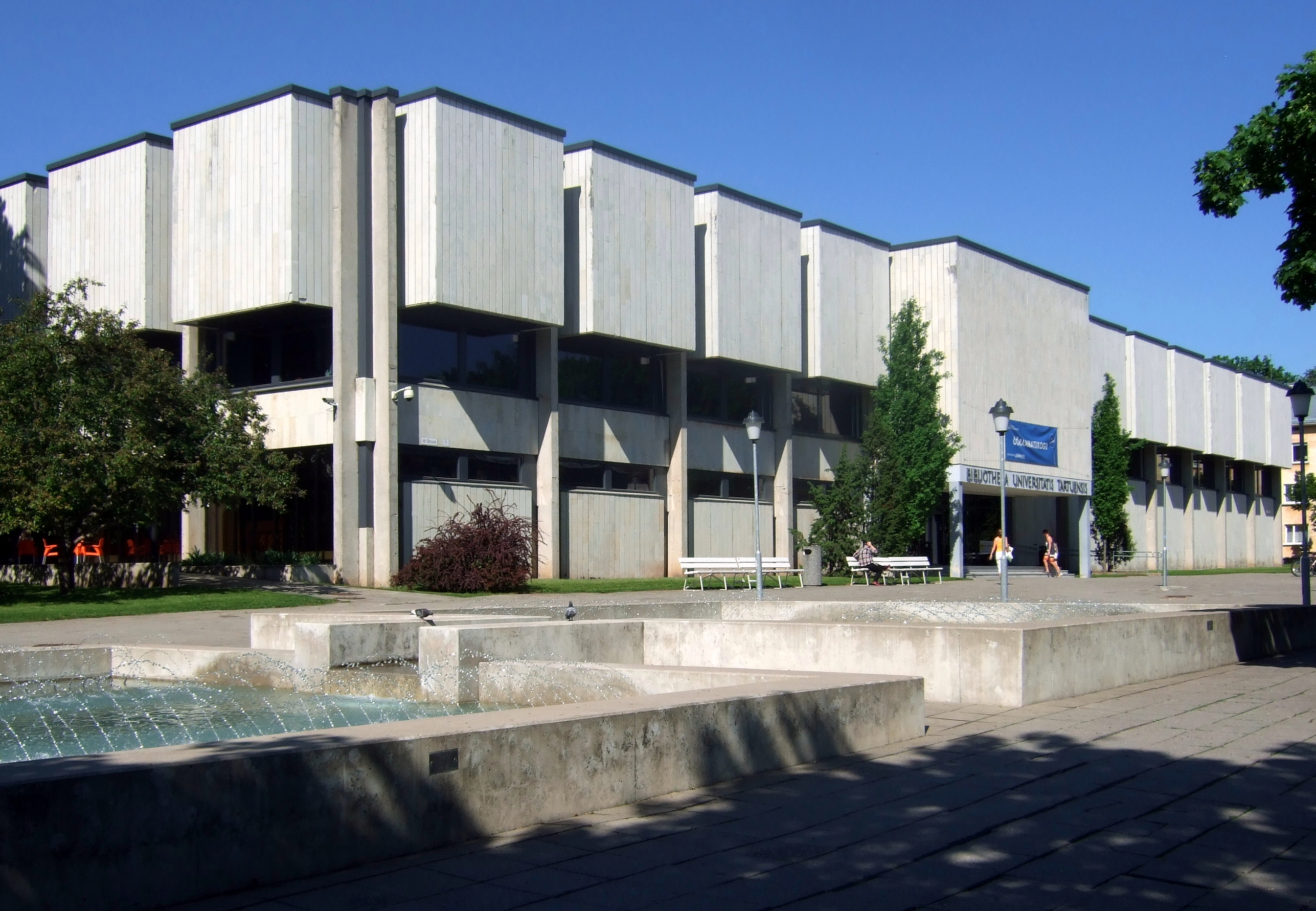
University Library

== Research ==
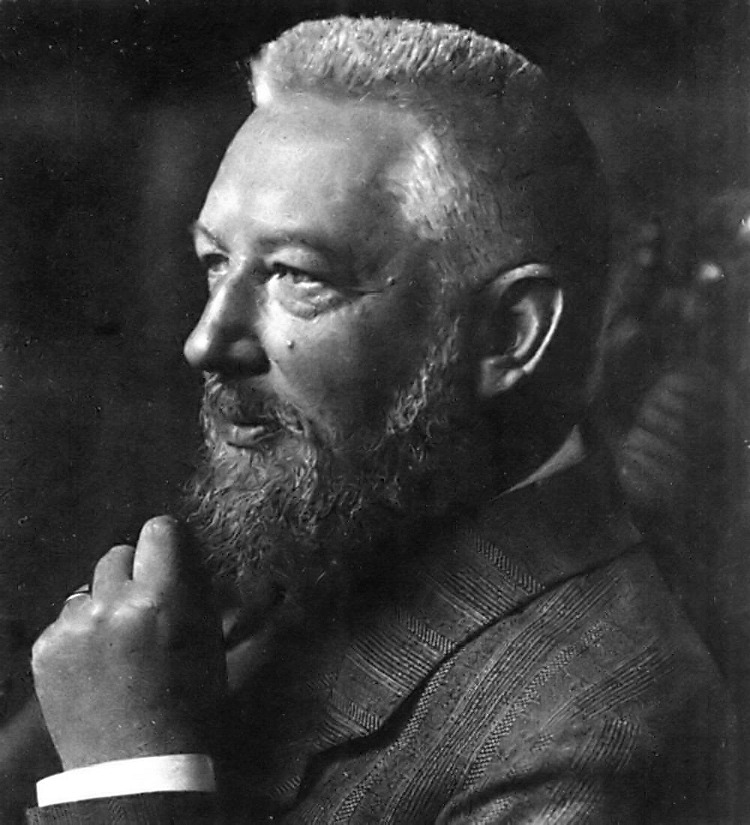
The Baltic German chemist Wilhelm Ostwald received the Nobel Prize in Chemistry in 1909.

Lectinology, the science of lectins, was founded at the University of Tartu in 1888 with the publication of Peter Hermann Stillmark's thesis about the isolation of ricin.

According to the university administration, the most remarkable recent research achievements have been in the fields of molecular and cell biology, laser medicine, materials science, laser spectroscopy, biochemistry, and psychology.

UT is the flagship of Estonian science, ranking in the top 1% of the world's most-cited universities and research institutions in these fields (as of March 2025):

- Biology and biochemistry
- Chemistry
- Clinical medicine
- Engineering
- Environment/ecology
- Immunology
- Geosciences
- Materials science
- Microbiology
- Molecular biology and genetics
- Neuroscience and behavior
- Pharmacology and toxicology
- Plant and animal science
- Psychiatry and psychology
- Social sciences, general.

UT accounts for 56% of Estonia's national research output. Also, more than half of the PhD theses in Estonia are defended at UT and over 2,000 high-level research articles (those covered by citation indices like "SCI Expanded", "SSCI", or "A&HCI") are published annually. About 50 UT scientists are among the top 1% of the most-cited scientists in the world.

UT has excelled among the Baltic universities in winning European Research Council grants. The prestigious ERC grant has been awarded to Professor of Molecular Systems Biology Mart Loog, Professor of Nanomedicine Tambet Teesalu, and Professor of International Law Lauri Mälksoo.

== Entrepreneurship ==
University of Tartu has contracts with 154 business partners in the amount of 10.2 million euros. UT is one of the largest development partners for the private and public sector in the Baltics. The university also works closely with international businesses such as Swedbank, The Linde Group, Pfizer, ABB Corporate Research, SUPER APPLI Inc, Eesti Energia Group, Telia AS, and many more.

UT has spun off more than 60 start-ups, including software companies Reach-U and Positium providing location-based solutions, biotechnology company Icosagen etc. The success story of the last 15 years is the technology for the ME-3 strain of Lactobacillus fermentum bacterium, allowing its use in the food industry. Student satellite ESTCube-1, developed collectively by UT staff and students, and successfully deployed into orbit in 2013, made Estonia the 41st space nation in the world. Scientists from UT and the Estonian University of Life Sciences have developed a new peat-based material that enables building inexpensive energy-efficient 3D-printed houses. The innovative robotic mannequin technology known as Rakuten Fits Me, a virtual dressing room, was originally developed in cooperation with researchers of UT Institute of Technology.

UT encourages its students and scholars to develop an entrepreneurial mindset and apply their knowledge to the economy. The university has set a goal to integrate entrepreneurship courses into every curriculum.

== Structure ==
The UT's academic structure consists of the institutes and colleges of four faculties (valdkond) and the university's institutions not affiliated to any faculty. The support structure of the university consists of 15 units.

While mainly located in Tartu, the university also operates in Narva, Pärnu, Tallinn, and Viljandi. Narva and Pärnu Colleges are part of the Faculty of Social Sciences, Viljandi Culture Academy belongs to the Faculty of Arts and Humanities. The School of Law Tallinn office, University of Tartu Tallinn representation and the Estonian Marine Institute are located in the Estonian capital.

Faculty of Arts and Humanities	Faculty of Social Sciences	Faculty of Medicine	Faculty of Science and Technology
School of Theology and Religious Studies	School of Law	Institute of Biomedicine and Translational Medicine	Estonian Marine Institute
Institute of History and Archaeology	School of Economics and Business Administration	Institute of Family Medicine and Public Health	Institute of Physics
Institute of Estonian and General Linguistics	Institute of Social Studies	Institute of Pharmacy	Institute of Chemistry
Institute of Philosophy and Semiotics	Institute of Education	Institute of Clinical Medicine	Institute of Molecular and Cell Biology
Institute of Cultural Research and Arts	Institute of Psychology	Institute of Dentistry	Institute of Technology
College of Foreign Languages and Cultures	Johan Skytte Institute of Political Studies	Institute of Sport Sciences and Physiotherapy	Institute of Ecology and Earth Sciences
Viljandi Culture Academy	Narva College		Institute of Computer Science
	Pärnu College		Institute of Mathematics and Statistics
			Tartu Observatory

== Studies ==
Nearly a quarter of the whole Estonian university student population studies at the University of Tartu. While most of the curricula are taught in Estonian, a number of degree programmes have English as a medium of instruction.

About 35% of UT's study courses are offered partly or fully online – as web-based courses in Moodle, video lectures, webinars, e-portfolios, and massive open online courses.

Some 61 bachelor's and 86 master's programmes are available, including 30 programmes in English.

=== Bachelor's studies ===
The university offers 61 different curricula on the bachelor's level, three bachelor's degree programmes are fully taught in English:

- Business administration
- Medicine
- Science and technology

=== Master's studies ===
University of Tartu has 86 study programmes on master's level. These programmes include 27 international master's programmes in English:

==== Faculty of Arts and Humanities ====
- Estonian and Finno-Ugric Languages
- Philosophy
- Semiotics
- Sound and Visual Technology
- Folkloristics and Heritage Studies
- European Languages and Cultures

==== Faculty of Social sciences ====
- Contemporary Asian and Middle Eastern Studies
- Digital Administration
- Disinformation and Societal Resilience
- Educational Technology
- Entrepreneurship in Economic Policymaking
- Information Technology Law
- Innovation and Technology Management
- International law and human rights
- International relations and regional studies
- Politics and Governance in the Digital Age
- Quantitative economics
- Wellness and spa service design and management

==== Faculty of Science and Technology ====
- Actuarial and Financial Engineering
- Bioengineering
- Computer Science
- Excellence in Analytical Chemistry
- Geoinformatics for Urbanised Society
- Materials Science and Technology
- Robotics and Computer Engineering
- Software Engineering

Faculty of Medicine

- Clinical Nutrition
- Clinical Pharmacy

=== Doctoral studies ===
Around 120 doctoral degrees are defended annually, which make up more than half of the total number in Estonia. The University of Tartu has 1,130 doctoral students, around 30% of them international. The University of Tartu offers eight doctoral programmes, which are coordinated by faculty-based centres for doctoral studies. Each programme contains multiple specialities offered by the faculty. Doctoral studies are provided by the Faculty of Arts and Humanities, the Faculty of Social Sciences, the Faculty of Medicine, and the Faculty of Science and Technology. From the 2022/2023 academic year, doctoral student places will mainly be offered as state-funded junior research fellow positions.

=== Continuing education ===
As the largest provider of continuing education in Estonia, the University of Tartu offers around 1,200 courses per year to more than 39,000 participants.

== Rankings and reputation ==
University rankings

Global – Overall
- ARWU World: 701–800 (2023)
- QS World: =362 (2026)
- THE World: 301–350 (2024)
- USNWR Global: =256 (2023)

The QS World University Rankings ranked the University of Tartu 358th in the world in 2024, and the top-ranked university in the Baltics. The university is also ranked 3rd in the Emerging Europe and Central Asia region. The Times Higher Education World University Rankings placed it in the 251–300 range among world universities. It is the only university in the Baltic countries to place among the top 200 universities in Europe. UT belongs to top 1% of world's most cited universities in 15 research areas. University of Tartu also won first place in Central and Eastern Europe by a number of venture capital money raised by the unicorn startups founded by its alumni.

== Alumni ==
According to the university, as of 2016, Tartu alumni account for 100% of Estonian judges; 99% of Estonian doctors, dentists, and pharmacists; 95% of Estonian judicial prosecutors; 87% of members of the Estonian Bar Association; 60% of the ministers in the Estonian government; and 40% of the members of the Riigikogu (Estonian Parliament).

== International cooperation ==
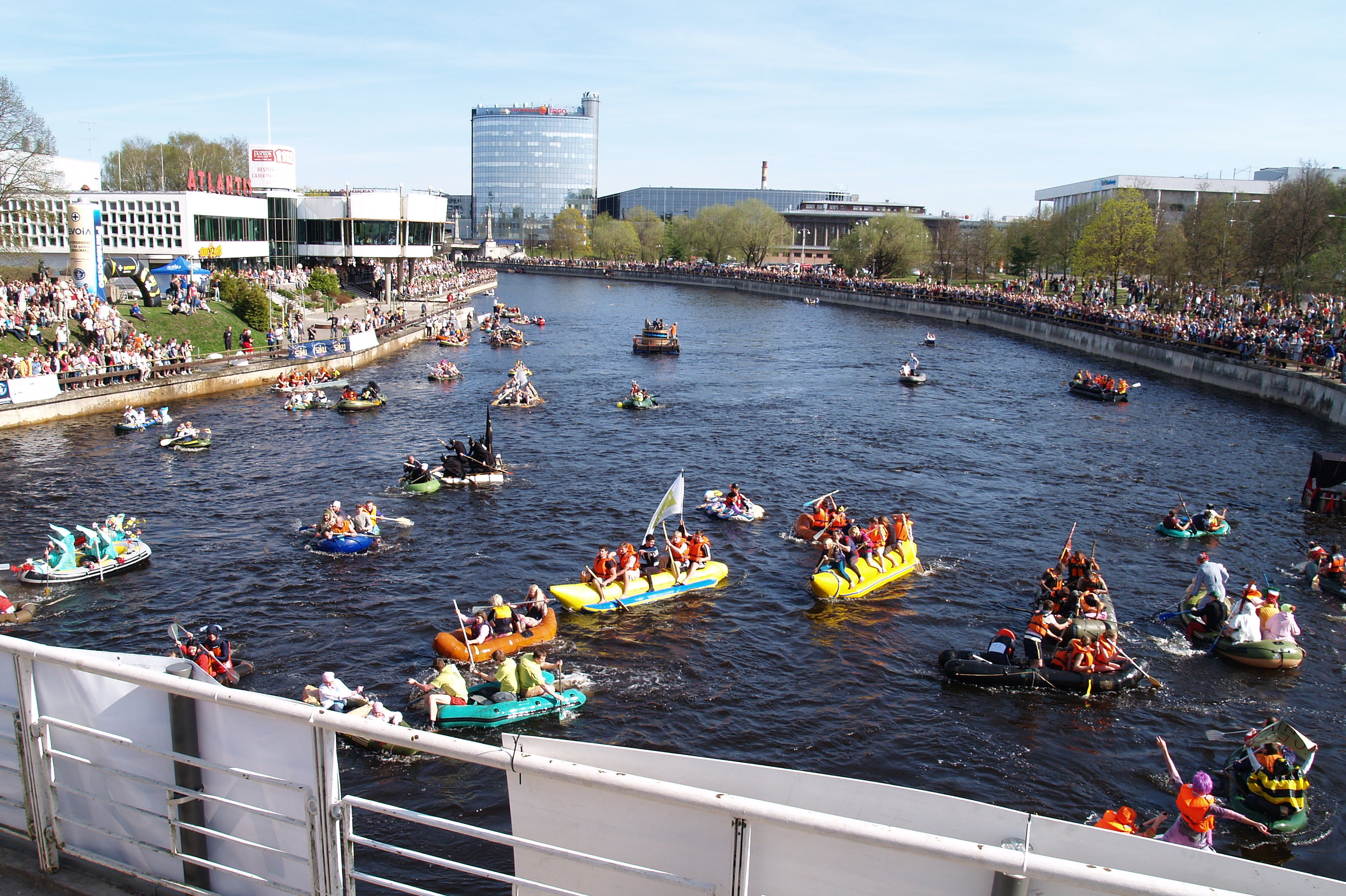
Students' Spring Days on river Emajõgi.

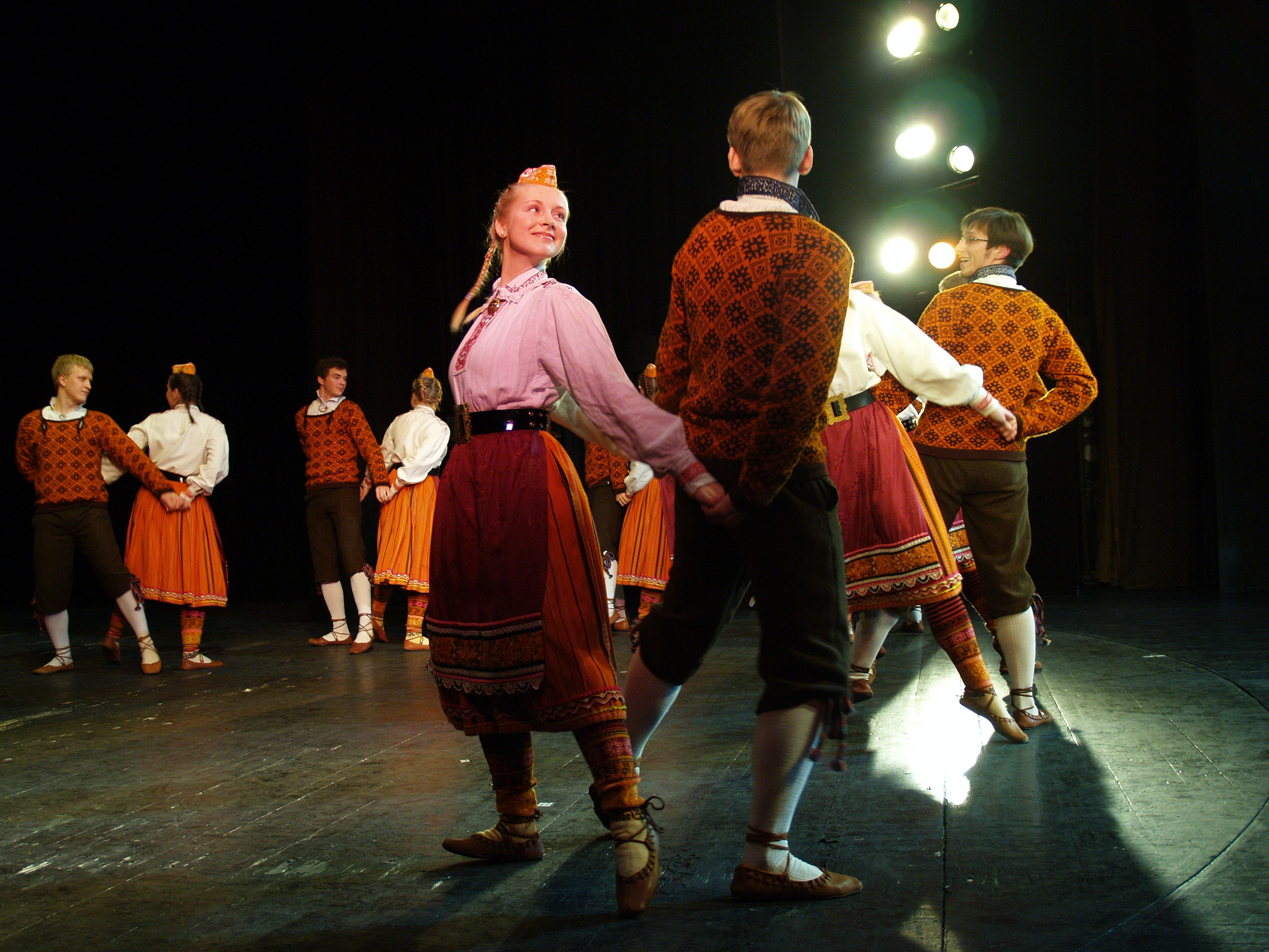
University of Tartu Folk Art Ensemble.

The University of Tartu has around 1,800 international students from 90 countries. The vast majority come from Ukraine, Russia, and Finland. In the Erasmus programme for student exchange, the University of Tartu cooperates with more than 800 universities.

The university has also received good reviews from foreign students and an International Student Satisfaction Award based on student feedback.

The University of Tartu participates in the LERU-CE7 (LERU and a group of Central-European universities), the European University Association EUA, Coimbra Group, The Guild of European Research Intensive Universities, and the Utrecht Network. It has signed bilateral co-operation agreements with about 70 universities.

== Monument to Gustav II Adolf ==
A statue of the formal founder of the university, King Gustav II Adolf of Sweden (also known as Gustavus Adolphus) was raised in 1928 on campus and remained until 1950 when it was removed by the Soviet occupation authorities. Another statue was raised in 1992 and was reopened by King Carl XVI Gustaf of Sweden and Queen Silvia. The new statue was made by Elisabeth Tebelius-Myren.

== See also ==
- List of early modern universities in Europe
- Tartu University Clinic
- Tartu University Library
- Tartu University Press
- Tartu Semiotic School
- Copenhagen-Tartu school
- Tartu Ülikool 350
- University of Tartu Old Observatory
- Tartu Students' Nature Conservation Circle

== Bibliography ==
- Reet Mägi; Wolfgang Drechsler, eds. (2004). Kaiserliche Universität Dorpat 200, 370 Academia Gustaviana: Tartu Ülikooli juubel. Tartu: Tartu Ülikooli Kirjastus. ISBN 9985-56-950-4.
- Siilivask, Karl, ed. (1985). History of Tartu University, 1632–1982. Tallinn: Perioodika.
- Die Universitäten Dorpat/Tartu, Riga und Wilna/Vilnius 1579–1979. Beiträge zu ihrer Geschichte und ihrer Wirkung im Grenzbereich zwischen West und Ost. Herausgegeben von Gert von Pistohlkors, Toivo U. Raun, Paul Kaegbein. Köln; Wien 1987 (Quellen und Studien zur baltischen Geschichte; 9). [Zweites Internationales Marburger Symposium zu Problemen der baltischen Sozial- und Kulturgeschichte]. [Lectures in German and English] ISBN 3-412-00886-9
- Palamets, Hillar; Tullio Ilomets, eds. (1982). Alma mater Tartuensis: Tartu Riiklik Ulikool: 1632–1982 (in Estonian). Tallinn: Eesti Raamat.
- von Engelhardt, Roderich (1933). Die deutsche Universität Dorpat in ihrer geistesgeschichtlichen Bedeutung (in German). Reval (Tallinn): F. Kluge.
- Semel, Hugo, ed. (1918). Die Universität Dorpat (1802–1918): Skizzen zu ihrer Geschichte von Lehrern und ehmaligen Schülern (in German). Dorpat (Tartu): H. Laakmann.
