= List of Baltic Germans =

This is a list of notable Baltic Germans.

== Art and literature ==
=== Architects ===
- Alfred Aschenkampff (1858–1914), architect (Latvia)
- Paul Max Bertschy (1840–1911), city architect of Liepāja (Latvia)
- Bernhard Bielenstein (1877–1959), architect (Latvia)
- Wilhelm Bockslaff (1858–1945), architect (Latvia)
- Johann Felsko (1813–1902), architect (Latvia)
- Karl Felsko, (1844–1918), architect (Latvia)
- Edgar Friesendorf (1881–1944), architect (Latvia)
- Christoph Haberland (1750–1803), architect (Latvia)
- Otto Pius Hippius (1826–1883), architect (Estonia)
- Erich Jacoby (1885–1941), architect (Estonia)
- Paul Mandelstamm (1872–1941), architect (Latvia)
- Robert Natus (1890–1950), architect (Estonia)
- Robert Pflug (1832–1885), architect (Latvia)
- August Reinberg (1860–1908), architect (Latvia)
- Jacques Rosenbaum (1878–1944), architect (Estonia)
- Alfred Rosenberg (1893–1946), politician, Nazi ideologist and architect (Germany)
- Max Scherwinsky (1859–1909), architect and designer (Latvia)
- Edmund von Trompowsky (1851–1919), architect (Latvia)

=== Artists ===
- Christian Ackermann (died 1710), wood carver and sculptor (Estonia)
- Johann Heinrich Baumann (1753–1832), painter (Latvia)
- Friedrich Hartmann Barisien (1724–1796), painter (Latvia)
- Karl Hans Bernewitz (1858–1934), sculptor (Latvia)
- Gregor von Bochmann (1850–1930), painter (Estonia)
- Bernhard Borchert (1863–1945), artist (Latvia)
- Mikhail Clodt (1832–1902), painter (Russia)
- Peter Clodt von Jürgensburg (1805–1867), sculptor (Russia)
- Franz Burchard Dörbeck (1799–1835), graphic artist and caricaturist (Estonia)
- Jacob Heinrich Elbfas (c. 1600–1664), painter (Sweden)
- Eduard von Gebhardt (1838–1925), painter (Estonia)
- Wilhelm August Golicke (1802–1848), painter (Russia)
- Eduard Hau (1807–1888), painter (Estonia / Russia)
- Woldemar Hau (1816–1896), painter (Estonia / Russia)
- August Matthias Hagen (1794–1878), painter (Estonia / Russia)
- Julie Wilhelmine Hagen-Schwarz (1824–1902), painter, daughter of the above (Estonia / Russia)
- Vasily Helmersen (1873–1893), artist and book illustrator (Russia)
- Carl von Hoffman (1889–1982), soldier, adventurer, author, and photographer (United States)
- Franz Hoppenstätt (died 1657/1658), wood carver (Estonia)
- George Hoyningen-Huene (1900–1968), fashion photographer (Russia)
- Alexander Julius Klünder, (1802–1875), portrait painter (Estonia)
- Alexander von Kotzebue (1815–1889), painter (Germany)
- Gerhard von Kügelgen (1772–1820), portrait and history painter (Germany)
- Karl von Kügelgen (1772–1832), landscape and history painter (Germany)
- Konstantin von Kügelgen (1810–1880), landscape painter (Germany)
- Otto Friedrich Theodor von Möller (1812–1874), painter (Russia)
- Carl Timoleon von Neff (1804–1877), painter (Estonia)
- August Georg Wilhelm Pezold (1794–1859), painter and lithographer (Estonia)
- Nikolaus Roerich (1874–1947), painter and philosopher (Russia)
- Otto Magnus von Stackelberg (1786–1837), archaeologist, writer, art historian and painter (Estonia / Russia)
- Egon von Vietinghoff (1903–1994), painter and philosopher (Germany / Switzerland)
- Gottlieb Welté (1745/49–1792), etcher and landscape painter (Germany / Estonia)

=== Authors and writers ===
- Friedrich Amelung (1842–1909), chess player, endgame composer, and journalist
- Werner Bergengruen (1892–1964), novelist
- Lovisa von Burghausen (1698–1733), slave and memoirist (Sweden)
- Anton Delvig (1798–1831), poet and journalist (Russia)
- Helene von Engelhardt (1850–1910)
- Nikolai Erdman (1900–1970), poet and playwright (Soviet Union)
- Carl Friedrich Glasenapp (1847–1915), biographer
- Julie Hausmann (1826–1901), poet
- Hermann Hesse (1877–1962), poet, novelist, and painter (Germany)
- Eduard von Keyserling (1855–1918), writer and playwright
- August von Kotzebue (1761–1819), playwright (Germany)
- Wilhelm Küchelbecker (1797–1846), poet and Decembrist (Russia)
- Anatol Lieven (born 1960), author, journalist, and policy analyst (United Kingdom)
- Garlieb Merkel (1769–1850), writer and public activist
- Elisa von der Recke (1754–1833), writer and poet
- Gleb Struve (1898–1985), poet and literary historian (United States)
- Frank Thiess (1890–1977), writer (Germany)
- Jakob von Uexkull (born 1944), writer and politician (Germany)
- Peter Ernst Wilde (1732–1785), physician and journalist (Estonia)
- Gero von Wilpert (1933–2009), writer and literary scientist
- Hilda Vīka (1887–1963), writer and artist

== Entertainment ==
=== Actors and actresses ===
- Heinz Erhardt (1909–1979), comedian, musician, entertainer, actor and poet (Livonia / Germany)
- Irene von Meyendorff (1916–2001), film actress (Germany)
- Ornella Muti (born 1955), film actress (Italy)
- Naike Rivelli (born 1974), actress and singer (Italy)
- Marie Seebach (1830–1897), actress (Germany)

=== Musicians ===
- Karl Ferdinand Amenda (1771–1836), music teacher (Latvia)
- John Christian Bechler (1784–1857), Moravian bishop and composer (United States, Russia)
- Eduard Erdmann (1896–1958), pianist, composer, professor (Germany)
- Heinz Erhardt (1909–1979), comedian, musician, entertainer, actor and poet (Latvia)
- Eduard Mertke (1833–1895), composer and music teacher (Latvia)
- Lena Meyer-Landrut (born 1991), singer (Germany)
- Carl David Stegmann (1751–1826), tenor and composer (Germany)
- Raimund von zur-Mühlen (1854–1931), tenor and music educator (Livonia / Estonia}

== Entrepreneurs ==
- James Martin Eder (1838–1921), pioneer of sugar industry in Colombia (Lithuania}
- Johann Friedrich Hartknoch (1740–1789), book publisher {Prussia}
- Karl Otto Georg von Meck (1821–1876), businessman (Silesia / Poland}
- Matthew Shiffner (c. 1690-1756), merchant (UK)
- Baron Nils Taube, (1928–2008), Britain's longest serving fund manager, colleague of George Soros and advisor to Lord Rothschild (UK)

== Explorers ==
- Reinhold von Anrep-Elmpt (1834–1888), explorer
- Karl Ernst von Baer (1792–1876), biologist, geologist, meteorologist, geographer, founder of embryology
- Fabian Gottlieb von Bellingshausen (1778–1852), explorer (Russia)
- Alexander von Bunge (1803–1890), botanist and expeditionist (Russia)
- Karl von Ditmar (1822–1892), geologist and explorer (Russia)
- Karl Eichwald (1795–1876), geologist and physician (Russia)
- Johann Friedrich von Eschscholtz (1793–1831), biologist, physician and explorer (Russia)
- Johann Anton Güldenstädt (1745–1781), naturalist and explorer
- Ludwig von Hagemeister (1780–1833), seafarer and explorer (Russia)
- Carl von Hoffman (1889–1982), soldier, adventurer, author, and photographer (United States)
- Alexander von Kaulbars (1844–1925) military commander and explorer (Russia)
- Otto von Kotzebue (1787–1846), explorer (Russia)
- Adam Johann von Krusenstern (1770–1846), explorer (Russia).
- Friedrich von Lütke (1797–1898), navigator and geographer (Russia)
- Richard Maack (1825–1886), biologist, geographer and explorer (Russia)
- Alexander von Middendorff (1815–1894), zoologist and explorer
- Michael von Reinken (1801–1859), vice-admiral and hydrographer (Russia)
- Otto Schmidt (1891–1956), mathematician, astronomer, geophysicist (Soviet Union)
- Alexander von Schrenk (1816–1876), mineralogist, botanist and expeditionist (Russia)
- Leopold von Schrenck (1826–1894), zoologist, geographer and ethnographer (Russia)
- Georg August Schweinfurth (1836–1925), botanist and explorer
- Eduard von Toll (1858–1902), geologist and explorer (Russia)
- Ferdinand von Wrangel (1797–1870), explorer (Russia).

== Military ==
- Alexander of Courland (1658–1686), prince and military commander (Prussia)
- Władysław Anders (1892–1970), military commander and politician (Poland)
- Michael Andreas Barclay de Tolly (1761–1818), military commander (Russia).
- Alexander von Benckendorff (1783–1844), military commander (Russia)
- Konstantin von Benckendorff (1785–1828), military commander and diplomat (Russia)
- Friedrich Wilhelm Rembert von Berg (1793–1874), military commander (Russia)
- Karl Ludwig von Budberg (1775–1829), military commander (Russia)
- Friedrich Wilhelm von Buxhoeveden (1750–1811), military commander (Russia)
- Jacob von Eggers (1704–1773), military engineer (Sweden, Electorate of Saxony)
- Magnus Gustav von Essen (1759–1813), military commander (Russia)
- Nikolai von Essen (1860–1915), admiral (Russia)
- Peter Kirillovich Essen (1772–1844), military commander (Russia)
- Jürgen von Farensbach (1551–1602), military commander (Livonia)
- William Fermor (1702–1771), military commander (Russia)
- Wessel Freytag von Loringhoven (1899–1944), colonel and member of the Widerstand (Germany)
- Adrian von Fölkersahm (1914–1945), military commander (Nazi Germany)
- Dmitry Gustavovich von Fölkersahm (1846–1905), admiral (Russia)
- Maksimas Katche (1879–1933), military commander (Russia, Lithuania)
- Alexander von Kaulbars (1844–1925) military commander and explorer (Russia)
- Pavel Fyodorovich Keller (1883–1980), military officer (Russia/Romania)
- Paul Demetrius von Kotzebue (1801–1884), military officer (Russia)
- Ernst Gideon von Laudon (1717–1790), military commander (Livonia / Austria)
- Christoph von Lieven (1774–1839), military commander, politician and diplomat (Russia)
- Eugen Ludwig Müller (1867–1939), military commander (Russia)
- Burkhard Christoph von Münnich (1683–1767), military commander (Russia)
- Fabian Gottlieb von der Osten-Sacken (1752–1837), field marshal (Russia)
- Johann Patkul (1660–1707), politician and military commander (Sweden, Poland, Russia)
- Wolter von Plettenberg (1450–1535), Master of Livonian Order
- Paul von Rennenkampf (1854–1918), military commander (Russia)
- Ernst von Stackelberg (1813–1870), diplomat and military figure (Russia)
- Georg von Stackelberg (1851–1913), cavalry general (Russia)
- Eduard von Totleben (1818–1884), engineer-general (Russia)
- Roman von Ungern-Sternberg (1885–1921), military commander (Russia)
- Viktor von Wahl (1840–1915), military commander and politician (Russia)
- Carl Gustaf Wrangel (1613–1676), military commander and statesman (Sweden)
- Carl Henrik Wrangel (1681–1755), military commander (Sweden)
- Herman Wrangel (1587–1643), military commander and statesman (Sweden)
- Pyotr Nikolayevich von Wrangel (1878–1928), military commander (Russia)

== Philosophers ==
- Johann Eduard Erdmann (1805–1892), pastor, historian of philosophy (Latvia)
- Nicolai Hartmann (1882–1950), philosopher (Germany)
- Hermann Graf Keyserling (1880–1946), philosopher (Livonia / Estonia)
- Alfred Rosenberg (1893–1946), politician, Nazi ideologist and architect (Germany)
- Egon von Vietinghoff (1903–1994), painter and philosopher (Germany, Switzerland)

== Politicians and diplomats ==
- Ernst Johann von Biron (1690–1772), Duke of Courland
- Peter von Biron (1724–1800), Duke of Courland
- Andreas von Budberg-Bönninghausen (1750–1812), diplomat and politician (Russia)
- Andreas von Budberg-Bönninghausen (1817–1881), diplomat (Russia)
- Sophie von Buxhoeveden (1883–1956), lady in waiting to Tsarina Alexandra of Russia
- Balthasar von Campenhausen (1772–1823), politician (Russia)
- Karl Robert von Nesselrode (1780–1862), diplomat (Russia)
- Stanisław Ernest Denhoff (1673–1728), noble and statesman (Poland)
- Kasper Doenhoff (1587–1645), courtier and diplomat (Poland)
- Ernst Magnus Dönhoff (1581–1642), noble and diplomat
- Princess Dorothea of Courland (1793–1862), noblewoman
- Hans Reinhold von Fersen (1683–1736), military commander and politician (Sweden)
- Reinhold Johan von Fersen (1646–1716), county governor (Sweden)
- Siim Kallas (born 1948), former Prime Minister of Estonia
- Ferdinand Kettler (1655–1737), Duke of Courland
- Friedrich Kettler (1569–1642), Duke of Courland
- Frederick William Kettler (1692–1711), Duke of Courland
- Frederick Casimir Kettler (1650–1698), Duke of Courland
- Gotthard Kettler (1517–1587), last Master of the Livonian Order and the first Duke of Courland
- Jacob Kettler (1610–1682), Duke of Courland
- Wilhelm Kettler (1574–1640), Duke of Courland
- Andreas Meyer-Landrut (born 1929), diplomat (Germany)
- Egils Levits (born 1955), former president of Latvia
- Christoph von Lieven (1774–1839), military commander, politician and diplomat (Russia)
- Dorothea von Lieven (1785–1857), noblewoman and diplomat (Russia)
- Christoph Johann von Medem (1763–1838), courtier (Russia)
- Dorothea von Medem (1761–1821), last Duchess of Courland
- Karl Robert von Nesselrode (1780–1862), diplomat (Russia)
- Peter Ludwig von der Pahlen, (1745–1826), military Governor of St. Petersburg from 1798 to 1801, played pivotal role in the assassination of Emperor Paul.
- Johann Patkul (1660–1707), politician and military commander (Sweden, Poland, Russia)
- Adolf Pilar von Pilchau (1851–1925), politician, regent of the United Baltic Duchy
- Wolter von Plettenberg (1450–1535), Master of Livonian Order
- Alfred Rosenberg (1893–1946), politician, Nazi ideologist and architect, and convicted war criminal (Germany)
- Max Erwin von Scheubner-Richter (1884–1923), politician (Nazi Germany)
- Jacob von Sievers (1731–1808), politician (Russia)
- Ernest Stackelberg (1813–1870), diplomat and military figure
- Gustav Ernst von Stackelberg (1766–1850), diplomat (Russia)
- Otto Magnus von Stackelberg (1736–1800), diplomat (Russia)
- Karl von Struve (1835–1907), politician and diplomat (Russia)
- Jakob von Uexkull (born 1944), writer and politician (Germany)
- Victor von Wahl (1840–1915), military commander and politician
- Princess Wilhelmine (1781–1839), noble and the Duchess of Sagan
- Sergei Witte (1849–1915), first Prime Minister of the Russian Empire (Russia)
- Carl Gustaf Wrangel (1613–1676), military commander and statesman (Sweden)
- Olaf von Wrangel (1928–2009), journalist and politician, member of Bundestag (Germany)
- Herman Wrangel (1587–1643), military commander and statesman (Sweden)

== Religion ==
- Albert of Riga (Albert von Buxthoeven, 1165–1229), Bishop of Riga
- Alexy II of Moscow (Alexey Mikhailovich Ridiger, 1929–2008), Patriarch of Moscow
- John Christian Bechler (1784–1857), Moravian bishop and composer (United States, Russia)
- Anna Hedvig Büll (1887–1981), Christian missionary
- Reinhold von Buxhoeveden (died 1557), Bishop of Ösel-Wiek
- Hermann of Dorpat (1163–1248), first Bishop of Dorpat
- Oscar von Gebhardt (1844–1906), Lutheran theologian
- Barbara von Krüdener (1764–1824), mystic
- Karl Nikolai von Nolcken (1830–1913), clergyman and writer
- Hermann Wesel (died 1563), ecclesiastic and the last Bishop of Dorpat
- Adolf von Harnack (1851–1930), Lutheran theologian and church historian (Germany)
- Alexander Schmemann (1921–1983), Orthodox Christian priest, teacher, and writer

== Scientists ==
=== Astronomers and cosmologists ===
- Wilhelm Anderson (1880–1940), astrophysicist (Russia / Estonia)
- Magnus Georg Paucker (1787–1855), astronomer and mathematician (Estonia)
- Otto Schmidt (1891–1956), mathematician, astronomer, geophysicist (Soviet Union)
- Friedrich Georg Wilhelm von Struve (1793–1864), astronomer (Russia)
- Georg Hermann Struve (1886–1933), astronomer (Germany)
- Hermann Struve (1854–1920), astronomer (Russia)
- Ludwig Struve (1858–1920), astronomer (Russia)
- Otto Struve (1897–1963), astronomer (Russia, United States)
- Otto Wilhelm von Struve (1819–1905), astronomer (Russia)
- Wilfried Struve (1914–1992), astronomer (Germany)
- Gustav Andreas Tammann (1932–2019), astronomer (Germany, Switzerland)

=== Biologists and paleontologists ===
- Hermann Martin Asmuss (1812–1859), paleozoologist (Estonia)
- Karl Ernst von Baer (1792–1876), biologist, geologist, meteorologist, geographer, founder of embryology.
- Theodor Friedrich Julius Basiner (1816–1842), botanist
- Friedrich Bidder (1810–1894), physiologist and anatomist (Russia)
- Theophil Joachim Heinrich Bienert (1833–1873), botanist
- Alexander von Bunge (1803–1890), botanist (Russia)
- Karl Ernst Claus (1796–1864), chemist and naturalist
- Johann Friedrich von Eschscholtz (1793–1831), biologist, physician and explorer (Russia)
- Gustav Flor (1829–1883), zoologist
- Peter von Glehn (1835–1876), botanist
- Alexander von Keyserling (1815–1891), geologist and paleontologist
- Karl Wilhelm von Kupffer (1829–1902), anatomist
- Carl Friedrich von Ledebour (1785–1851), botanist (Russia)
- Harald von Loudon (1876–1959), ornithologist
- Johann Marcusen (1817–1894), ichthyologist
- Friedrich Johann Graf von Medem (1912–1984), zoologist
- Alexander von Middendorff (1815–1894), zoologist and explorer
- Wilhelm Ostwald (1853–1932), chemist, winner of the Nobel prize in Chemistry
- Wolfgang Ostwald (1883–1943), chemist and biologist (Germany)
- Heinz Christian Pander (1794–1865), biologist, embryologist and paleontologist
- Friedrich Parrot (1791–1841), biologist and medical scientist
- Christian Nikolai Richard Pohle (1869–1926), botanist
- Alexander von Schrenk (1816–1876), mineralogist, botanist and expeditionist (Russia)
- Leopold von Schrenck (1826–1894), zoologist, geographer and ethnographer (Russia)
- Jakob von Uexküll (1864–1944), biologist and semiotician (Germany)

=== Chemists and material scientists ===
- Andreas von Antropoff (1878–1956), chemist, postulated neutronium
- Karl Ernst Claus (1796–1864), chemist and naturalist
- Germain Henri Hess (1802–1850), chemist
- Wilhelm Ostwald (1853–1932), chemist and Nobel laureate (Germany)
- Wolfgang Ostwald (1883–1943), chemist and biologist (Germany)
- Carl Schmidt (1822–1894), chemist (Russia)
- Heinrich Wilhelm von Struve (1822–1908), chemist (Russia)
- Gustav Heinrich Tammann (1861–1938), chemist
- Peter P. von Weymarn (1879–1935), chemist (Russia)
- Margarete von Wrangell (1877–1932), agricultural chemist and the first female full professor at a German university
- Theodor Grotthuss (1785–1822), electrochemist

=== Earth scientists ===
- Karl Ernst von Baer (1792–1876), biologist, geologist, meteorologist, geographer, founder of embryology
- Karl von Ditmar (1822–1892), geologist and explorer (Russia)
- Karl Eichwald (1795–1876), geologist and physician (Russia)
- Gregor von Helmersen (1803–1885), geologist
- Carl Hiekisch (1840–1901), geographer
- Alexander Keyserling (1815–1891), geologist and paleontologist
- Fyodor Litke (Friedrich Benjamin von Lütke, 1797–1898), navigator and geographer (Russia)
- Otto Schmidt (1891–1956), mathematician, astronomer, geophysicist (Soviet Union)
- Alexander von Schrenk (1816–1876), mineralogist, botanist and expeditionist (Russia)
- Leopold von Schrenck (1826–1894), zoologist, geographer and ethnographer (Russia)
- Georg August Schweinfurth (1836–1925), botanist and explorer
- Eduard von Toll (1858–1902), geologist and explorer (Russia)

=== Economists and sociologists ===
- August Johann Gottfried Bielenstein (1826–1907), linguist, folklorist, ethnographer and theologian
- Dominic Lieven (born 1952), political scientist (London School of Economics, United Kingdom)
- Paul von Lilienfeld (1829–1903), social scientist
- Heinrich Freiherr von Stackelberg (1905–1946), economist (Germany)

=== Historians and archeologists ===
- Elmar Arro (1899–1985), music historian
- Georg Dehio (1850–1932), art historian
- Paul Einhorn (died 1655), historian (Latvia)
- Gustav von Ewers (1779–1830), legal historian and scholar (Russia)
- Jean Baptiste Holzmayer (1839–1890), teacher, archeologist and folklorist (Estonia)
- Otto Magnus von Stackelberg (1786–1937), archaeologist, writer, art historian and painter
- Kurt Zoege von Manteuffel (1881–1941), art historian
- Richard Otto Zöpffel (1843–1891), theologist and church historian

=== Linguists and ethnographers ===
- Nikolai Anderson (1845–1905), philologist
- Walter Anderson (1885–1962), folklorist
- August Johann Gottfried Bielenstein (1826–1907), linguist, folklorist, ethnographer and theologian
- Peter A. Boodberg (1903–1972), sinologist (United States)
- Emil Bretschneider (1833–1901), sinologist
- Johann Christoph Brotze (1742–1823), pedagogue and ethnographer
- Elena Lieven (born 1947), psycholinguist and cognitive scientist (United Kingdom)
- Carl Salemann (1850-1916), Iranist
- Leopold von Schrenck (1826–1894), zoologist, geographer and ethnographer (Russia)
- Alexander von Staël-Holstein (1877–1937), orientalist, sinologist, sanskritologist (Estonia)
- Vasily Vasilievich Struve (1889–1965), orientalist (Soviet Union)
- Jakob von Uexküll (1864–1944), biologist and semiotician (Germany)
- Thure von Uexküll (1908–2004), semiotician (Germany)
- Alexander Vostokov (1781–1864), philologist (Russia)
- Edgar de Wahl (1867–1948), linguist (Estonia)
- Ferdinand Johann Wiedemann (1805–1887), linguist (Estonia)
- Gero von Wilpert (1933–2009), writer and literary scientist

=== Mathematicians ===
- Christian Goldbach (1690-1764), mathematician
- Oskar Anderson (1887–1960), mathematician and statistician
- Georg Cantor (1845–1918), mathematician (Germany)
- Edgar Krahn (1894–1961), mathematician
- Theodor Molien (1861–1941), mathematician
- Magnus Georg Paucker (1787–1855), astronomer and mathematician
- Erhard Schmidt (1876–1959), mathematician
- Otto Schmidt (1891–1956), mathematician, astronomer, geophysicist (Soviet Union)

=== Physicians and psychologists ===
- Ernst von Bergmann (1836–1907), surgeon (Germany)
- Eugen Bostroem (1850–1928), pathologist
- Arthur Böttcher (1831–1889), pathologist and anatomist
- Isidorus Brennsohn (1854–1928), doctor of medicine and biographer
- Karl Gottfried Konstantin Dehio (1851–1927), internist and pathologist
- Karl Eichwald (1795–1876), geologist and physician (Russia)
- Johann Friedrich von Eschscholtz (1793–1831), biologist, physician and explorer (Russia)
- Woldemar Kernig (1840–1917), physician
- Karl Wilhelm von Kupffer (1829–1902), anatomist
- Elena Lieven, psycholinguist and cognitive scientist (United Kingdom)
- Werner Zoege von Manteuffel (1857–1926), medical surgeon
- Georg von Oettingen (1824–1916), ophthalmologist
- Friedrich Parrot (1791–1841), biologist and medical scientist
- Zacharias Stopius (c. 1535 – end of the 16th or early 17th century), doctor and astronomer
- Thure von Uexküll (1908–2004), semiotician (Germany)
- Eduard Georg von Wahl (1833–1890), surgeon
- Justus Heinrich Wigand (1769–1817), obstetrician
- Peter Ernst Wilde (1732–1785), physician and journalist

=== Physicists ===
- Daniel Gabriel Fahrenheit (1686-1736), physicist and engineer (Poland)
- Heinrich Lenz (1804–1865), physicist (Livonia / Estonia)
- Arthur von Oettingen (1836–1920), physicist, meteorologist and music theorist (Livonia / Estonia)
- Georg Wilhelm Richmann (1711–1753), physicist (Livonia / Estonia)
- Thomas Johann Seebeck (1770–1831), physicist (Estonia / Germany)

=== Theologians ===
- August Johann Gottfried Bielenstein (1826–1907), linguist, folklorist, ethnographer and theologian (Latvia)
- Georg Caspari (1683–1743), theologian (Livonia / Latvia)
- Alexander von Oettingen (1827–1905), theologian (Livonia / Estonia)
- Richard Otto Zöpffel (1843–1891), theologist and historian (Livonia / Estonia)

=== Other scientists and engineers ===
- August von Bulmerincq (1822–1890), legal scholar (Latvia)
- Jean Alexander Heinrich Clapier de Colongue (1838–1901), marine engineer and naval architect (Latvia)
- Bernhard Schmidt (1879–1935), optician, inventor (Estonia)
- Amand Struve (1835–1898), military engineer and bridge specialist (Russia)
- Friedrich Zander (1887–1933), rocket scientist (Russia, Soviet Union)
- Walter Zapp (1905–2003), inventor (Latvia / Estonia)

== Sports ==
- Ursula Donath (1931–2026), runner (East Germany)

=== Chess players ===
- Friedrich Amelung (1842–1909), cultural historian, businessman and endgame composer (Estonia)
- Andreas Ascharin (1843–1896), chess master (Estonia / Latvia)
- Bernhard Gregory (1879–1939), chess master (Estonia)
- Lionel Kieseritzky (1806–1853), chess master (Estonia)
- R.K. Kieseritzky (1870–?), chess master ( ? )
- Theodor Molien (1861–1941), mathematician and chess problemist (Latvia)
- Paul Felix Schmidt (1916–1984), chess master (Estonia)
- Wilhelm von Stamm (?–1905), chess master (Latvia)

== Other ==
- Johann Burchart (1546–1616), pharmacist (Hungary)
- Gustav Fabergé (1814–1893), jeweller (Livonia / Estonia)
- Nikolai von Glehn (1841–1923), landowner and public figure, founder of Nõmme (Estonia)
- Meldra Rosenberg (born 2002), model and former Ms. Universe (Latvia)
- Vasiliy Ulrikh (1889–1951), judge, Great Purge perpetrator (Soviet Union)
