= Sartorio =

Sartorio may refer to:

- Three brothers from Venice:
  - Antonio Sartorio (1630–1680), Venetian composer
  - Gasparo Sartorio (1625–1680), Venetian composer
  - Girolamo Sartorio (died 1707), Venetian architect
- Antoine Sartorio (1885–1988), French sculptor
- Arnoldo Sartorio (1853–1936), German composer, choral conductor, and piano teacher
- Carolina Sartorio, philosopher
- Giulio Aristide Sartorio (1860–1932), Italian painter
- Giuseppe Sartorio (1854–1922), Italian sculptor

== See also ==
- Casa Sartorio, historic building situated in Milan, Italy
- Museo Sartorio, Trieste
