= March 30 =

March 30 this year in various calendars
- Monday, 30 March 2026
| Akan | Fodwo |
| Armenian | 13 Ahekani 1475 |
| Aztec | Huei Tecuilhuitl 19, 2 Mazātl |
| Babylonian | 10 Adaru, 2336 SE |
| Balinese pawukon | Luang, Pepet, Pasah, Jaya, Umanis, Tungleh, Coma of Watugunung, Guru, Nohan, Raksasa |
| Bengali | 16 Chaitro, BS 1432 |
| Chinese | Yin Water Rabbit・Exntended Net Mansion; Fire Horse Year, Month 2, Day 12 (Chunfen, 6 days until Qingming) |
| Common Era | 30 March 2026 CE |
| Coptic | 21 Paremhat, AM 1742 |
| Egyptian | 18 Mesori, 2774 NE |
| Ethiopian | 21 Magābit, 2018 Amätä Məhrät |
| French Republican | Décade I, Décadi de Germinal de l'Année 234 de la République |
| Gregorian | 30 March, AD 2026 |
| Hebrew | 12 Nisan, AM 5786 |
| Hindu | Maghā・Śūla; Solar: 17 Caitra, 1947 SE; Lunisolar: Dvādaśī, Śukla pakṣa of Caitra, 2083 VE; Rāudra・5126 KY・1,872,664 |
| Icelandic | Mánudagur, 7 Einmánuður 2025 |
| Islamic | 11 Shawwal, AH 1447 (using tabular method) |
| ISO week date | 2026-W14-1 |
| Japanese | 12 Kisaragi, Reiwa 8 (Shunbun, 6 days until Seimei) |
| Julian | 17 March, AD 2026 (AM 7534) |
| Julian day | 2461130 |
| Korean | 12 Tokkidal, 4359 DE |
| Maya | 13.0.13.8.7; 0 Pop, 2 Manik |
| Roman | ante diem XVI Kalendas Apriles, MMDCCLXXIX AUC |
| Solar Hijri | 10 Farvardin, SH 1405 |
| Tibetan | 13 dbo, me pho rta 2153 or 1772 or 1000 |

| << | March | | | | | >> |
| Su | Mo | Tu | We | Th | Fr | Sa |
| 1 | 2 | 3 | 4 | 5 | 6 | 7 |
| 8 | 9 | 10 | 11 | 12 | 13 | 14 |
| 15 | 16 | 17 | 18 | 19 | 20 | 21 |
| 22 | 23 | 24 | 25 | 26 | 27 | 28 |
| 29 | 30 | 31 |
2026

March 30 in recent years
2026 (Monday)
2025 (Sunday)
2024 (Saturday)
2023 (Thursday)
2022 (Wednesday)
2021 (Tuesday)
2020 (Monday)
2019 (Saturday)
2018 (Friday)
2017 (Thursday)

March 30 is the 89th day of the year (90th in leap years) in the Gregorian calendar; 276 days remain until the end of the year.

== Events ==
=== Pre-1600 ===
- 598 – Avar–Byzantine wars: The Avars lift the siege at the Byzantine stronghold of Tomis. Their leader Bayan I retreats north of the Danube River after the Avaro-Slavic army is decimated by the plague.
- 1282 – The people of Sicily rebel against the Angevin king Charles I, in what becomes known as the Sicilian Vespers.
- 1296 – Edward I sacks Berwick-upon-Tweed, during armed conflict between Scotland and England.

=== 1601–1900 ===
- 1699 – Guru Gobind Singh establishes the Khalsa in Anandpur Sahib, Punjab.
- 1815 – Joachim Murat issues the Rimini Proclamation, among the earliest calls for Italian unification.
- 1818 – Physicist Augustin Fresnel reads a memoir on optical rotation to the French Academy of Sciences, reporting that when polarized light is "depolarized" by a Fresnel rhomb, its properties are preserved in any subsequent passage through an optically-rotating crystal or liquid.
- 1822 – The Florida Territory is created in the United States.
- 1841 – The National Bank of Greece is founded in Athens.
- 1842 – Ether anesthesia is used for the first time, in an operation by the American surgeon Dr. Crawford Long.
- 1844 – One of the most important battles of the Dominican War of Independence from Haiti takes place near the city of Santiago de los Caballeros.
- 1855 – Origins of the American Civil War: "Border Ruffians" from Missouri invade Kansas and force election of a pro-slavery legislature.
- 1856 – The Treaty of Paris is signed, ending the Crimean War.
- 1861 – Discovery of the chemical elements: Sir William Crookes announces his discovery of thallium.
- 1863 – Danish prince Wilhelm Georg is chosen as King George of Greece.
- 1867 – Alaska is purchased from Russia for $7.2 million, about two cents/acre ($4.19/km^{2}), by United States Secretary of State William H. Seward.
- 1870 – Texas is readmitted to the United States Congress following Reconstruction.
- 1885 – The Battle for Kushka triggers the Panjdeh Incident which nearly gives rise to war between the Russian and British Empires.
- 1899 – German Society of Chemistry issues an invitation to other national scientific organizations to appoint delegates to the International Committee on Atomic Weights.
- 1900 – Archaeologists in Knossos, Crete, discover the first clay tablet with hieroglyphic writing in a script later called Linear B.

=== 1901–present ===
- 1912 – Sultan Abd al-Hafid signs the Treaty of Fez, making Morocco a French protectorate.
- 1918 – Beginning of the bloody March Events in Baku and other locations of Baku Governorate.
- 1939 – The Heinkel He 100 fighter sets a world airspeed record of 463 mph (745 km/h).
- 1940 – Second Sino-Japanese War: Japan declares Nanking capital of a new Chinese puppet government, nominally controlled by Wang Jingwei.
- 1944 – World War II: Allied bombers conduct their most severe bombing run on Sofia, Bulgaria.
- 1944 – World War II: In a raid on Nuremberg, RAF Bomber Command suffers its greatest loss of the war, losing 95 bombers from a force of 795.
- 1945 – World War II: Soviet forces invade Austria and capture Vienna. Polish and Soviet forces liberate Danzig.
- 1949 – Cold War: A riot breaks out in Austurvöllur square in Reykjavík, when Iceland joins NATO.
- 1959 – Tenzin Gyatso, the 14th Dalai Lama, flees Tibet for India.
- 1961 – The Single Convention on Narcotic Drugs is signed in New York City.
- 1965 – Vietnam War: A car bomb explodes in front of the United States Embassy, Saigon, killing 22 and wounding 183 others.
- 1967 – Delta Air Lines Flight 9877 crashes at Louis Armstrong New Orleans International Airport, killing 19.
- 1972 – Vietnam War: The Easter Offensive begins after North Vietnamese forces cross into the Demilitarized Zone (DMZ) of South Vietnam.
- 1976 – Israeli-Palestinian conflict: in the first organized response against Israeli policies by a Palestinian collective since 1948, Palestinians create the first Land Day.
- 1979 – Airey Neave, a British Member of Parliament (MP), is killed by a car bomb as he exits the Palace of Westminster. The Irish National Liberation Army claims responsibility.
- 1981 – U.S. President Ronald Reagan is shot in the chest outside a Washington, D.C., hotel by John Hinckley Jr.; three others are wounded in the same incident.
- 1982 – Space Shuttle program: STS-3 mission is completed with the landing of Columbia at White Sands Missile Range, New Mexico.
- 2002 – The 2002 Lyon car attack takes place.
- 2006 – Cyclone Glenda, one of the strongest tropical cyclones in the Australian region makes landfall near Onslow, Western Australia.
- 2008 – Drolma Kyi arrested by Chinese authorities.
- 2009 – Twelve gunmen attack the Manawan Police Academy in Lahore, Pakistan.
- 2011 – Min Aung Hlaing is appointed as the Commander-in-Chief of Myanmar's armed forces.
- 2017 – SpaceX conducts the world's first reflight of an orbital class rocket.
- 2018 – The Israeli Army kills 17 Palestinians and wounds 1,400 in Gaza during Land Day protests.
- 2019 – Pope Francis visits Morocco.
- 2023 – Donald Trump becomes the first former United States president to be indicted by a grand jury.

== Births ==
=== Pre-1600 ===
- 892 – Shi Jingtang, founder of the Later Jin Dynasty (died 942)
- 1135 – Maimonides, Spanish rabbi and philosopher (April 6 also proposed, d. 1204)
- 1326 – Ivan II of Moscow (died 1359)
- 1432 – Mehmed the Conqueror, Ottoman sultan (died 1481)
- 1510 – Antonio de Cabezón, Spanish composer and organist (died 1566)
- 1551 – Salomon Schweigger, German theologian (died 1622)

=== 1601–1900 ===
- 1606 – Vincentio Reinieri, Italian mathematician and astronomer (died 1647)
- 1640 – John Trenchard, English politician, Secretary of State for the Northern Department (died 1695)
- 1727 – Tommaso Traetta, Italian composer and educator (died 1779)
- 1746 – Francisco Goya, Spanish-French painter and sculptor (died 1828)
- 1750 – John Stafford Smith, English organist and composer (died 1836)
- 1793 – Juan Manuel de Rosas, Argentinian soldier and politician, 13th Governor of Buenos Aires Province (died 1877)
- 1805 – Ferdinand Johann Wiedemann, German-Swedish linguist and botanist (died 1887)
- 1811 – Robert Bunsen, German chemist and academic (died 1899)
- 1820 – Anna Sewell, English author (died 1878)
- 1820 – James Whyte, Scottish-Australian politician, 6th Premier of Tasmania (died 1882)
- 1844 – Paul Verlaine, French poet (died 1896)
- 1853 – Vincent van Gogh, Dutch-French painter and illustrator (died 1890)
- 1853 – Arnoldo Sartorio, German composer, pianist, and teacher (died 1936)
- 1857 – Léon Charles Thévenin, French engineer (died 1926)
- 1858 – Siegfried Alkan, German composer (died 1941)
- 1863 – Mary Calkins, American philosopher and psychologist (died 1930)
- 1864 – Franz Oppenheimer, German-American sociologist and economist (died 1943)
- 1874 – Charles Lightoller, English 2nd officer on the RMS Titanic (died 1952)
- 1874 – Josiah McCracken, American hammer thrower, shot putter, and football player (died 1962)
- 1874 – Nicolae Rădescu, Romanian general and politician, Prime Minister of Romania (died 1953)
- 1875 – Thomas Xenakis, Greek-American gymnast (died 1942)
- 1879 – Coen de Koning, Dutch speed skater (died 1954)
- 1880 – Seán O'Casey, Irish dramatist, playwright, and memoirist (died 1964)
- 1882 – Melanie Klein, Austrian-English psychologist and author (died 1960)
- 1888 – J. R. Williams, Canadian-born cartoonist (died 1957)
- 1891 – Chunseong, Korean monk, writer and philosopher (died 1977)
- 1892 – Stefan Banach, Polish mathematician and academic (died 1945)
- 1892 – Fortunato Depero, Italian painter and sculptor (died 1960)
- 1892 – Erhard Milch, German field marshal (died 1972)
- 1892 – Johannes Pääsuke, Estonian photographer and director (died 1918)
- 1892 – Erwin Panofsky, German historian and academic (died 1968)
- 1894 – Tommy Green, English race walker (died 1975)
- 1894 – Sergey Ilyushin, Russian engineer, founded Ilyushin Design Bureau (died 1977)
- 1895 – Jean Giono, French author and poet (died 1970)
- 1895 – Carl Lutz, Swiss vice-consul to Hungary during WWII, credited with saving over 62,000 Jews (died 1975)
- 1895 – Charlie Wilson, English footballer (died 1971)
- 1899 – Sharadindu Bandyopadhyay, Indian author, playwright, and screenwriter (died 1970)

=== 1901–present ===
- 1902 – Brooke Astor, American socialite and philanthropist (died 2007)
- 1902 – Ted Heath, English trombonist and composer (died 1969)
- 1903 – Joy Ridderhof, American missionary (died 1984)
- 1904 – Ripper Collins, American baseball player and coach (died 1970)
- 1905 – Archie Birkin, English motorcycle racer (died 1927)
- 1905 – Mikio Oda, Japanese triple jumper and academic (died 1998)
- 1905 – Albert Pierrepoint, English hangman (died 1992)
- 1907 – Friedrich August Freiherr von der Heydte, German general (died 1994)
- 1907 – Shigeru Morita, Japanese painter (died 2009)
- 1910 – Józef Marcinkiewicz, Polish soldier, mathematician, and academic (died 1940)
- 1911 – Ekrem Akurgal, Turkish archaeologist and academic (died 2002)
- 1912 – Jack Cowie, New Zealand cricketer (died 1994)
- 1912 – Alvin Hamilton, Canadian lieutenant and politician, 18th Canadian Minister of Agriculture (died 2004)
- 1913 – Marc Davis, American animator (died 2000)
- 1913 – Richard Helms, American soldier and diplomat, 8th Director of Central Intelligence (died 2002)
- 1913 – Frankie Laine, American singer-songwriter (died 2007)
- 1913 – Ċensu Tabone, Maltese general, physician, and politician, 4th President of Malta (died 2012)
- 1914 – Sonny Boy Williamson I, American singer-songwriter and harmonica player (died 1948)
- 1915 – Pietro Ingrao, Italian journalist and politician (died 2015)
- 1917 – Els Aarne, Ukrainian-Estonian pianist, composer, and educator (died 1995)
- 1919 – McGeorge Bundy, American intelligence officer and diplomat, 6th United States National Security Advisor (died 1996)
- 1919 – Robin Williams, New Zealand mathematician, university administrator and public servant (died 2013)
- 1921 – André Fontaine, French historian and journalist (died 2013)
- 1922 – Turhan Bey, American actor (died 2012)
- 1922 – Arthur Wightman, American physicist and academic (died 2013)
- 1923 – Milton Acorn, Canadian poet and playwright (died 1986)
- 1925 – Hans Reichelt, German politician (died 2025)
- 1926 – Ingvar Kamprad, Swedish businessman, founded IKEA (died 2018)
- 1927 – Wally Grout, Australian cricketer (died 1968)
- 1928 – Robert Badinter, French lawyer and politician, French Minister of Justice (died 2024)
- 1928 – Colin Egar, Australian cricket umpire (died 2008)
- 1928 – Tom Sharpe, English-Spanish author and educator (died 2013)
- 1929 – Richard Dysart, American actor (died 2015)
- 1929 – Ray Musto, American soldier and politician (died 2014)
- 1929 – István Rózsavölgyi, Hungarian runner (died 2012)
- 1930 – John Astin, American actor
- 1930 – Rolf Harris, Australian singer-songwriter (died 2023)
- 1933 – Jean-Claude Brialy, French actor and director (died 2007)
- 1933 – Joe Ruby, American animator (died 2020)
- 1934 – Paul Crouch, American broadcaster, co-founded the Trinity Broadcasting Network (died 2013)
- 1934 – Hans Hollein, Austrian architect and academic, designed Haas House (died 2014)
- 1935 – Karl Berger, German pianist and composer (died 2023)
- 1935 – Willie Galimore, American football player (died 1964)
- 1935 – Gordon Mumma, American composer
- 1937 – Warren Beatty, American actor, director, producer, and screenwriter
- 1937 – Ian MacLaurin, Baron MacLaurin of Knebworth, English businessman
- 1938 – John Barnhill, American basketball player and coach (died 2013)
- 1938 – Klaus Schwab, German economist and engineer, founded the World Economic Forum
- 1940 – Norman Gifford, English cricketer (died 2026)
- 1940 – Jerry Lucas, American basketball player and educator
- 1940 – Hans Ragnemalm, Swedish lawyer and judge (died 2016)
- 1940 – David Earle Bailey, American Episcopal priest (died 2024)
- 1941 – Graeme Edge, English singer-songwriter and drummer (died 2021)
- 1941 – Ron Johnston, English geographer and academic (died 2020)
- 1941 – Wasim Sajjad, Pakistani lawyer and politician, President of Pakistan
- 1941 – Bob Smith, American soldier and politician
- 1942 – Ruben Kun, Nauruan lawyer and politician, 14th President of Nauru (died 2014)
- 1942 – Tane Norton, New Zealand rugby player (died 2023)
- 1942 – Kenneth Welsh, Canadian actor (died 2022)
- 1943 – Jay Traynor, American pop and doo-wop singer (died 2014)
- 1944 – Mark Wylea Erwin, American businessman and diplomat
- 1944 – Brian Wilshire, Australian radio host (died 2026)
- 1945 – Eric Clapton, English guitarist and singer-songwriter
- 1947 – Lorenzo Kom'boa Ervin, American activist, writer, and black anarchist
- 1947 – Dick Roche, Irish politician, Minister of State for European Affairs
- 1947 – Terje Venaas, Norwegian bassist (died 2025)
- 1948 – Nigel Jones, Baron Jones of Cheltenham, English computer programmer and politician (died 2022)
- 1948 – Eddie Jordan, Irish racing driver and team owner, founded Jordan Grand Prix (died 2025)
- 1948 – Mervyn King, English economist and academic
- 1948 – Jim "Dandy" Mangrum, American rock singer
- 1949 – Liza Frulla, Canadian talk show host and politician, 3rd Minister of Canadian Heritage
- 1949 – Dana Gillespie, English singer-songwriter and actress
- 1949 – Naomi Sims, American model and author (died 2009)
- 1950 – Janet Browne, English-American historian and academic
- 1950 – Robbie Coltrane, Scottish actor (died 2022)
- 1950 – Grady Little, American baseball player, coach, and manager
- 1952 – Stuart Dryburgh, English-New Zealand cinematographer
- 1952 – Peter Knights, Australian footballer and coach
- 1955 – Randy VanWarmer, American singer-songwriter and guitarist (died 2004)
- 1956 – Bill Butler, Scottish educator and politician
- 1956 – Juanito Oiarzabal, Spanish mountaineer
- 1956 – Paul Reiser, American actor and comedian
- 1956 – Shahla Sherkat, Iranian journalist and author
- 1957 – Marie-Christine Koundja, Chadian author and diplomat
- 1958 – Maurice LaMarche, Canadian voice actor and stand-up comedian
- 1958 – Joey Sindelar, American golfer
- 1959 – Martina Cole, English television host and author
- 1960 – Laurie Graham, Canadian skier
- 1960 – Bill Johnson, American skier (died 2016)
- 1961 – Mike Thackwell, New Zealand racing driver
- 1961 – Doug Wickenheiser, Canadian-American ice hockey player (died 1999)
- 1962 – Mark Begich, American politician
- 1962 – MC Hammer, American rapper and actor
- 1962 – Gary Stevens, English international footballer and manager
- 1963 – Tsakhiagiin Elbegdorj, Mongolian journalist and politician, 4th President of Mongolia
- 1963 – Panagiotis Tsalouchidis, Greek footballer
- 1964 – Vlado Bozinovski, Macedonian-Australian footballer and manager
- 1964 – Tracy Chapman, American singer-songwriter and guitarist
- 1965 – Piers Morgan, English journalist and talk show host
- 1966 – Efstratios Grivas, Greek chess player and author
- 1966 – Dmitry Volkov, Russian swimmer (died 2025)
- 1966 – Leonid Voloshin, Russian triple jumper
- 1967 – Christopher Bowman, American figure skater and coach (died 2008)
- 1967 – Richard Hutten, Dutch furniture designer
- 1967 – Julie Richardson, New Zealand tennis player
- 1968 – Celine Dion, Canadian singer-songwriter
- 1969 – Troy Bayliss, Australian motorcycle racer
- 1970 – Tobias Hill, English poet and author (died 2023)
- 1970 – Sylvain Charlebois, Canadian food/agriculture researcher and author
- 1971 – Mari Holden, American cyclist
- 1971 – Mark Consuelos, American actor and television personality
- 1972 – Mili Avital, Israeli-American actress
- 1972 – Emerson Thome, Brazilian footballer and scout
- 1972 – Karel Poborský, Czech footballer
- 1973 – Adam Goldstein, American keyboard player, DJ, and producer (died 2009)
- 1973 – Jan Koller, Czech footballer
- 1973 – Kareem Streete-Thompson, Caymanian-American long jumper
- 1974 – Martin Love, Australian cricketer
- 1975 – Paul Griffen, New Zealand-Italian rugby player
- 1976 – Ty Conklin, American ice hockey player
- 1976 – Obadele Thompson, Barbadian sprinter
- 1976 – Troels Lund Poulsen, Danish politician, Minister for Education of Denmark
- 1977 – Abhishek Chaubey, Indian director and screenwriter
- 1978 – Paweł Czapiewski, Polish runner
- 1978 – Chris Paterson, Scottish rugby player and coach
- 1978 – Bok van Blerk, South African singer-songwriter and actor
- 1979 – Norah Jones, American singer-songwriter and pianist
- 1979 – Anatoliy Tymoshchuk, Ukrainian footballer
- 1980 – Katrine Lunde, Norwegian handball goalkeeper
- 1980 – Kristine Lunde-Borgersen, Norwegian handball player
- 1980 – Ricardo Osorio, Mexican footballer
- 1981 – Jammal Brown, American football player
- 1981 – Andrea Masi, Italian rugby player
- 1982 – Mark Hudson, English footballer
- 1982 – Philippe Mexès, French footballer
- 1982 – Javier Portillo, Spanish footballer
- 1982 – Jason Dohring, American actor
- 1983 – Jérémie Aliadière, French footballer
- 1984 – Mario Ančić, Croatian tennis player
- 1984 – Samantha Stosur, Australian tennis player
- 1985 – Giacomo Ricci, Italian racing driver
- 1986 – Sergio Ramos, Spanish footballer
- 1987 – Trent Barreta, American wrestler
- 1987 – Calum Elliot, Scottish footballer
- 1987 – Kwok Kin Pong, Hong Kong footballer
- 1987 – Marc-Édouard Vlasic, Canadian ice hockey player
- 1988 – Will Matthews, Australian rugby league player
- 1988 – Thanasis Papazoglou, Greek footballer
- 1988 – Richard Sherman, American football player
- 1988 – Larisa Yurkiw, Canadian alpine skier
- 1989 – Chris Sale, American baseball player
- 1989 – João Sousa, Portuguese tennis player
- 1990 – Thomas Rhett, American country music singer and songwriter
- 1990 – Michal Březina, Czech figure skater
- 1991 – NF, American rapper
- 1992 – Palak Muchhal, Indian playback singer
- 1993 – Anitta, Brazilian singer and entertainer
- 1994 – Alex Bregman, American baseball player
- 1994 – Jetro Willems, Dutch footballer
- 1995 – Zay Jones, American football player
- 1995 – Simone Ashley, English actress
- 1996 – Ryan Noda, American baseball player
- 1997 – Cha Eun-woo, South Korean singer, actor, and model
- 1998 – Kalyn Ponga, Australian rugby league player
- 2000 – Colton Herta, American race car driver
- 2001 – Anastasia Potapova, Russian tennis player

== Deaths ==
=== Pre-1600 ===
- 116 – Quirinus of Neuss, Roman martyr and saint
- 365 – Ai of Jin, emperor of the Jin Dynasty (born 341)
- 943 – Li Bian, emperor of Southern Tang (born 889)
- 987 – Arnulf II, Count of Flanders (born 960)
- 1180 – Al-Mustadi, Caliph (born 1142)
- 1202 – Joachim of Fiore, Italian mystic and theologian (born 1135)
- 1465 – Isabella of Clermont, queen consort of Naples (born c. 1424)
- 1472 – Amadeus IX, Duke of Savoy (born 1435)
- 1486 – Thomas Bourchier, English cardinal (born 1404)
- 1526 – Konrad Mutian, German humanist (born 1471)
- 1540 – Matthäus Lang von Wellenburg, German cardinal (born 1469)
- 1559 – Adam Ries, German mathematician and academic (born 1492)
- 1587 – Ralph Sadler, English politician, Secretary of State for England (born 1507)

=== 1601–1900 ===
- 1662 – François le Métel de Boisrobert, French poet and playwright (born 1592)
- 1689 – Kazimierz Łyszczyński, Polish atheist and philosopher (born 1634)
- 1707 – Sébastien Le Prestre de Vauban, French general and engineer (born 1633)
- 1764 – Pietro Locatelli, Italian violinist and composer (born 1695)
- 1783 – William Hunter, Scottish anatomist and physician (born 1718)
- 1804 – Victor-François, 2nd duc de Broglie, French general and politician, French Secretary of State for War (born 1718)
- 1806 – Georgiana Cavendish, Duchess of Devonshire (born 1757)
- 1830 – Louis I, Grand Duke of Baden (born 1763)
- 1840 – Beau Brummell, English-French fashion designer (born 1778)
- 1842 – Louise Élisabeth Vigée Le Brun, French painter (born 1755)
- 1864 – Louis Schindelmeisser, German clarinet player, composer, and conductor (born 1811)
- 1873 – Bénédict Morel, Austrian-French psychiatrist and physician (born 1809)
- 1874 – Carl Julian (von) Graba, German lawyer and ornithologist who visited and studied the Faroe Islands (born 1799)
- 1879 – Thomas Couture, French painter and educator (born 1815)
- 1886 – Joseph-Alfred Mousseau, Canadian judge and politician, 6th Premier of Quebec (born 1838)
- 1896 – Charilaos Trikoupis, Greek politician, 55th Prime Minister of Greece (born 1832)

=== 1901–present ===
- 1907 – Aurora von Qvanten, Swedish writer and artist (born 1816)
- 1912 – Karl May, German author (born 1842)
- 1925 – Rudolf Steiner, Austrian philosopher and author (born 1861)
- 1935 – Romanos Melikian, Armenian composer (born 1883)
- 1936 – Conchita Supervía, Spanish soprano and actress (born 1895)
- 1940 – Sir John Gilmour, 2nd Baronet Scottish soldier and politician, Secretary of State for Scotland (born 1876)
- 1943 – Jan Bytnar, Polish lieutenant; WWII resistance fighter (born 1921)
- 1943 – Maciej Aleksy Dawidowski, Polish sergeant; WWII resistance fighter (born 1920)
- 1945 – Béla Balogh, Hungarian actor, director, and screenwriter (born 1885)
- 1949 – Friedrich Bergius, German chemist and academic, Nobel Prize laureate (born 1884)
- 1949 – Dattaram Hindlekar, Indian cricketer (born 1909)
- 1950 – Léon Blum, French lawyer and politician, Prime Minister of France (born 1872)
- 1952 – Nikos Beloyannis, Greek resistance leader and politician (born 1915)
- 1952 – Jigme Wangchuck, Bhutanese king (born 1905)
- 1955 – Harl McDonald, American pianist, composer, and conductor (born 1899)
- 1956 – Edmund Clerihew Bentley, English author and poet (born 1875)
- 1959 – Daniil Andreyev, Russian mystic and poet (born 1906)
- 1959 – John Auden, English solicitor, deputy coroner and a territorial soldier (born 1894)
- 1959 – Riccardo Zanella, Italian politician (born 1875)
- 1960 – Joseph Haas, German composer and educator (born 1879)
- 1961 – Philibert Jacques Melotte, English astronomer (born 1880)
- 1963 – Aleksandr Gauk, Russian conductor and composer (born 1893)
- 1964 – Nella Larsen, American nurse and author (born 1891)
- 1965 – Philip Showalter Hench, American physician and academic, Nobel Prize laureate (born 1896)
- 1966 – Newbold Morris, American lawyer and politician (born 1902)
- 1966 – Maxfield Parrish, American painter and illustrator (born 1870)
- 1966 – Erwin Piscator, German director and producer (born 1893)
- 1967 – Frank Thorpe, Australian public servant (born 1885)
- 1967 – Jean Toomer, American poet and novelist (born 1894)
- 1969 – Lucien Bianchi, Belgian racing driver (born 1934)
- 1970 – Heinrich Brüning, German economist and politician, Chancellor of Germany (born 1885)
- 1972 – Mahir Çayan, Turkish politician (born 1946)
- 1972 – Gabriel Heatter, American radio commentator (born 1890)
- 1973 – Douglas Douglas-Hamilton, 14th Duke of Hamilton, Scottish pilot and politician (born 1903)
- 1973 – Yves Giraud-Cabantous, French racing driver (born 1904)
- 1975 – Peter Bamm, German journalist and author (born 1897)
- 1977 – Levko Revutsky, Ukrainian composer and educator (born 1889)
- 1978 – George Paine, English cricketer and coach (born 1908)
- 1978 – Memduh Tağmaç, Turkish general (born 1904)
- 1979 – Airey Neave, English colonel, lawyer, and politician, Shadow Secretary of State for Northern Ireland (born 1916)
- 1979 – Ray Ventura, French pianist and bandleader (born 1908)
- 1981 – DeWitt Wallace, American publisher, co-founded Reader's Digest (born 1889)
- 1984 – Karl Rahner, German-Austrian priest and theologian (born 1904)
- 1985 – Harold Peary, American actor and singer (born 1908)
- 1986 – James Cagney, American actor and dancer (born 1899)
- 1986 – John Ciardi, American poet and etymologist (born 1916)
- 1988 – Edgar Faure, French historian and politician, Prime Minister of France (born 1908)
- 1990 – Harry Bridges, Australian-born American activist and trade union leader (born 1901)
- 1991 – Athanasios Ragazos, Greek long-distance runner (born 1913)
- 1992 – Manolis Andronikos, Greek archaeologist and academic (born 1919)
- 1992 – Harold LeVander, American politician, 32nd Governor of Minnesota (born 1910)
- 1993 – S. M. Pandit, Indian painter (born 1916)
- 1993 – Richard Diebenkorn, American painter (born 1922)
- 1995 – Rozelle Claxton, American pianist (born 1913)
- 1995 – Tony Lock, English-Australian cricketer and coach (born 1929)
- 1995 – Paul A. Rothchild, American record producer (born 1935)
- 1996 – Hugh Falkus, English pilot and author (born 1917)
- 1996 – Ryoei Saito, Japanese businessman (born 1916)
- 2000 – Rudolf Kirchschläger, Austrian judge and politician, 8th President of Austria (born 1915)
- 2002 – Queen Elizabeth the Queen Mother Queen Consort of King George VI of the United Kingdom, Empress Consort of India (born 1900)
- 2002 – Anand Bakshi, Indian poet and lyricist (born 1930)
- 2003 – Michael Jeter, American actor (born 1952)
- 2003 – Valentin Pavlov, Russian banker and politician, 11th Prime Minister of the Soviet Union (born 1937)
- 2004 – Alistair Cooke, English-American journalist and author (born 1908)
- 2004 – Michael King, New Zealand historian and author (born 1945)
- 2004 – Timi Yuro, American singer and songwriter (born 1940)
- 2005 – Robert Creeley, American novelist, essayist, and poet (born 1926)
- 2005 – Milton Green, American hurdler and soldier (born 1913)
- 2005 – Fred Korematsu, American political activist (born 1919)
- 2005 – Chrysanthos Theodoridis, Greek singer and songwriter (born 1934)
- 2005 – O. V. Vijayan, Indian author and illustrator (born 1930)
- 2005 – Mitch Hedberg, American stand-up comedian (born 1968)
- 2006 – Red Hickey, American football player and coach (born 1917)
- 2006 – John McGahern, Irish author and educator (born 1934)
- 2007 – John Roberts, Canadian political scientist, academic, and politician, 46th Secretary of State for Canada (born 1933)
- 2008 – Roland Fraïssé, French mathematical logician (born 1920)
- 2008 – David Leslie, Scottish racing driver (born 1953)
- 2008 – Richard Lloyd, English racing driver (born 1945)
- 2008 – Dith Pran, Cambodian-American photographer and journalist (born 1942)
- 2010 – Jaime Escalante, Bolivian-American educator (born 1930)
- 2010 – Morris R. Jeppson, American lieutenant and physicist (born 1922)
- 2010 – Martin Sandberger, German SS officer and convicted war criminal (born 1911)
- 2012 – Janet Anderson Perkin, Canadian baseball player and curler (born 1921)
- 2012 – Aquila Berlas Kiani, Indian-Canadian sociologist and academic (born 1921)
- 2012 – Francesco Mancini, Italian footballer and coach (born 1968)
- 2012 – Granville Semmes, American businessman, founded 1-800-Flowers (born 1928)
- 2012 – Leonid Shebarshin, Russian KGB officer (born 1935)
- 2013 – Daniel Hoffman, American poet and academic (born 1923)
- 2013 – Bobby Parks, American basketball player and coach (born 1962)
- 2013 – Phil Ramone, South African-American songwriter and producer, co-founded A & R Recording (born 1934)
- 2013 – Edith Schaeffer, Chinese-Swiss religious leader and author, co-founded L'Abri (born 1914)
- 2013 – Bob Turley, American baseball player and coach (born 1930)
- 2014 – Kate O'Mara, English actress (born 1939)
- 2014 – Alice Raftary, American educator of blind adults (born 1927)
- 2015 – Helmut Dietl, German director, producer, and screenwriter (born 1944)
- 2015 – Roger Slifer, American author, illustrator, screenwriter, and producer (born 1954)
- 2015 – Ingrid van Houten-Groeneveld, Dutch astronomer and academic (born 1921)
- 2018 – Bill Maynard, English actor (born 1928)
- 2020 – Manolis Glezos, Greek left-wing politician, journalist, author, and folk hero (born 1922)
- 2020 – Bill Withers, American singer-songwriter (born 1938)
- 2021 – G. Gordon Liddy, chief operative in the Watergate scandal (born 1930)
- 2021 – Myra Frances, British actress (born 1942)
- 2023 – Doug Mulray, Australian radio and television host (born 1951)
- 2024 – Tim McGovern, American visual effects artist (born 1955)
- 2024 – Chance Perdomo, British-American actor (born 1996)
- 2026 – Chan Santokhi, Surinamese politician, 9th President of Suriname (born 1959)

== Holidays and observances ==
- Christian feast day:
  - Blessed Amadeus IX, Duke of Savoy
  - Blessed Maria Restituta Kafka
  - John Climacus
  - Mamertinus of Auxerre
  - Quirinus of Neuss
  - Thomas Son Chasuhn, Marie-Nicolas-Antoine Daveluy (part of The Korean Martyrs)
  - Tola of Clonard
  - March 30 (Eastern Orthodox liturgics)
- Land Day (Palestine)
- National Doctors' Day (United States)
- Spiritual Baptist/Shouter Liberation Day (Trinidad and Tobago)
- School Day of Non-violence and Peace (Spain)
