= Berthold Benecke =

German anatomist and embryologist (1843–1886)

Berthold Adolph Benecke (27 February 1843, Elbing – 27 February 1886, Königsberg) was a German anatomist and embryologist. He made contributions in diverse subjects such as photomicrography and fish farming.

Beginning in 1861 he studied medicine at the University of Königsberg, where his influences were surgeon Albrecht Wagner and botanist Robert Caspary. From 1870 to 1877 he served as an instructor and prosector at the anatomical institute in Königsberg. In 1877 he was appointed to the chair of topographical anatomy at the university.

== Published works ==
In 1868 he published "Die Photographie als Hilfsmittel mikroskopischer Forschung" (The photograph as a tool of microscopic research), a translation of Albert Moitessier's "La photographie appliquée aux recherches micrographiques". His treatises "The enemies of pond culture in central Europe" (1887) and "Observations on salmon in German rivers" (1887) have been translated into English. Other works by Benecke include:

- Der Vorgang der Befruchtung am Ei der Neunaugen (with Karl Wilhelm von Kupffer), 1878 – The process of fertilization involving the lamprey egg.
- Photogramme Zur Ontogenie Der Vogel (with Karl Wilhelm von Kupffer), 1879 – Photograms in studies of ontogeny in birds.
- Die Trichinen und die mikroskopische Fleischschau, 1879 – Trichinosis and microscopy associated with meat inspection.
- Fische, Fischerei und Fischzucht in Ost- und Westpreussen, 1880 – Fish, fishing and fish farming in East and West Prussia.
- Handbuch der Fischzucht und Fischerei (with E. Dallmer, edited by Max von dem Borne), 1886 – Handbook of fish farming and fishing.
- Die teichwirtschaft. : Praktische anleitung zur anlage von teichen und deren nutzung nebst einer anleitung zur ausnützung unserer gewässer durch krebse (with Bruno Hofer), 1921 – The pond economy; practical guide for the installation of ponds, etc.
