= Invariant polynomial =

In mathematics, an invariant polynomial is a polynomial $P$ that is invariant under a group $\Gamma$ acting on a vector space $V$. Therefore, $P$ is a $\Gamma$-invariant polynomial if

$$P(\gamma x) = P(x)$$

for all $\gamma \in \Gamma$ and $x \in V$.

Cases of particular importance are for Γ a finite group (in the theory of Molien series, in particular), a compact group, a Lie group or algebraic group. For a basis-independent definition of 'polynomial' nothing is lost by referring to the symmetric powers of the given linear representation of Γ.
