= Wilpert =

Wilpert is a German surname. Notable people with the surname include:

- Bernhard Wilpert (1936–2007), German psychologist
- Gero von Wilpert (1933–2009), Baltic German literary scientist
- Günter Wilpert (1933–2006), German music pedagogue, trumpetist and composer
- Joseph Wilpert (1857−1944), German Christian archeologist
- Marni von Wilpert, American politician
