= Wolfgang Ostwald =

German physical chemist and biologist (1883–1943)

- Wolfgang Ostwald
- Born: 27 May 1883; Riga, Russian Empire
- Died: 22 November 1943 (aged 60); Dresden, Germany
- Known for: colloids
- Scientific career
- Fields: chemistry

Carl Wilhelm Wolfgang Ostwald (27 May 1883 – 22 November 1943) was a German chemist and biologist researching colloids.

Ostwald was born in Riga, the son of the 1909 winner of the Nobel Prize in Chemistry, Wilhelm Ostwald, and died in Dresden.

== Publications ==
- Grundriß der Kolloidchemie (Basics of colloid chemistry, 1909)
- Die Welt der vernachlässigten Dimensionen (The world of neglected dimensions, 1914)
- Ostwald, Wolfgang (1932), "Kritische Flussigkeitsgemische betrachtet als Kolloide Emulsoide" ('Critical Fluid Mixtures considered as Colloids/Emulsoids'), The Australian Journal of Experimental Biology and Medical Science, Vol.9, No.1, (January 1932), pp. 83-88.

== See also ==
- List of Baltic German scientists
