= Franz Burchard Dörbeck =

Baltic German artist

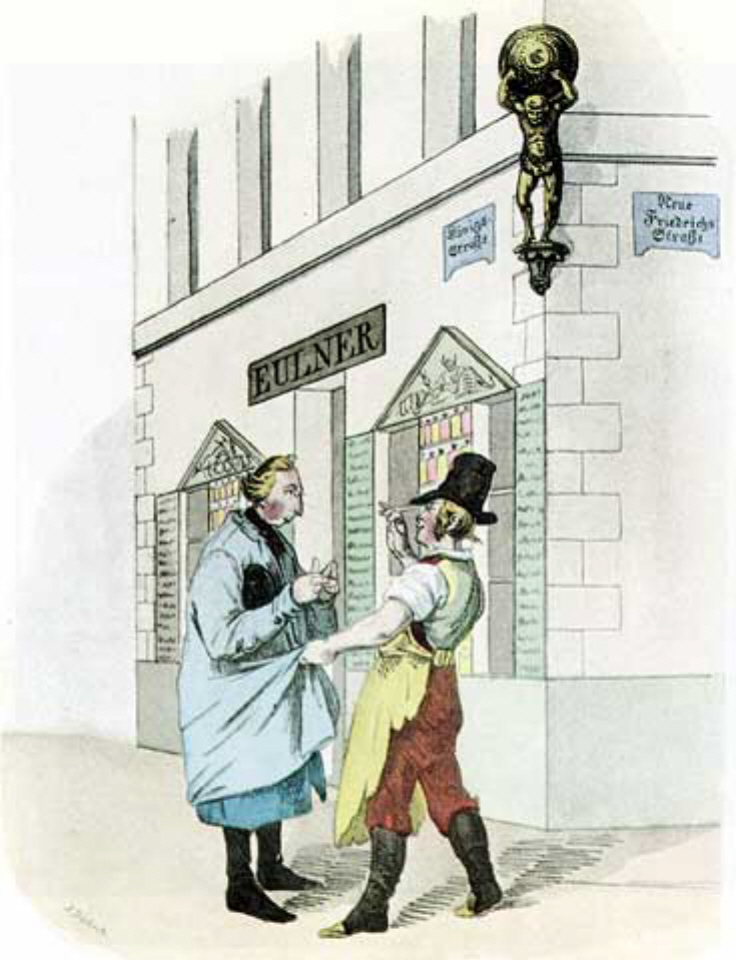
F.B. Dörbeck's caricature from 1830

Franz Burchard Dörbeck (21 February [O.S. 10 February] 1799 in Fellin – 2 October [O.S. 20 September] 1835 in Fellin) was a Baltic German graphic artist and caricaturist born in Fellin (now Viljandi, Viljandi County, Estonia) in what was then the Governorate of Livonia

From 1814 to 1816 Dörbeck studied engraving with Fritz Neyer in Saint Petersburg. After the early death of his first wife, Dörbeck moved to Riga where he was active from 1820 as a portrait artist. In 1823 Dörbeck moved to Berlin, Kingd I m of Prussia where he continued as a graphic artist and book illustrator. He gained fame with his caricatures published in newspapers. Dörbeck died in 1835 in Viljandi.

In the 1960s one of the streets in Berlin's Spandau district was named after him: Dörbeckweg.

In Estonian cultural history Dörbeck is known as the author of the only surviving portrait of Kristjan Jaak Peterson, the founder of modern Estonian poetry.

== See also ==
- List of Baltic German artists
- List of German painters
