= Bernhard Borchert =

Latvian artist (1863–1945)

Bernhard Borchert (1 December 1863 in Riga – 1945) was a Baltic-German painter who spent the greatest part of his life in Latvia. He entered the Imperial Academy of Arts in Saint Petersburg in 1883, and was in 1885 awarded a silver medal from the same institute. He produced book and magazine illustrations.

He was the author of the "Baltic artists’ painting exhibition" (Baltijas mākslinieku gleznu izstāde).

== See also ==
- List of Baltic German artists

== Artwork ==
The Devil and his Grandmother

The Temptation of the Virgin
