= Theodor Molien =

Russian mathematician (1861–1941)

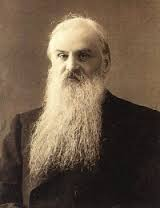
Theodor Molien (ca 1920)

Theodor Georg Andreas Molien (Russian: Fedor Eduardovich Molin; 10 September [O.S. 29 August] 1861 in Riga – 25 December 1941 in Tomsk) was a Russian mathematician of Baltic German origin. He was born in Riga, Latvia, which at that time was a part of Russian Empire. Molien studied associative algebras and polynomial invariants of finite groups.

== Life ==
=== Youth in Riga ===
Theodor Molien's father Eduard Molien was a teacher at the Riga Governorate Gymnasium. Theodor entered that gymnasium in 1872 and graduated in 1879.

=== Studies and work in Dorpat ===
In January 1880 Molien entered the Faculty of Physics and Mathematics of the Imperial University of Dorpat (now University of Tartu) as a student of astronomy. To support his studies his family also moved to Dorpat (now Tartu). In October 1883 the council of the university gave him the degree of a candidate of astronomy. His thesis "Bahn des Cometen 1880 III" was published in Astronomische Nachrichten No. 2510. His further work was supervised by the head of the chair of applied mathematics of the University of Dorpat Anders Lindstedt. In a report to the Faculty of Physics and Mathematics of the University of Dorpat Lindstedt acknowledges Molien as having unquestionably exceptional scientific talent (unzweifelhaft ungewöhnliche wissenschaftliche Begabung).

In the autumn of 1883, as part of his studies Molien was sent to Leipzig for three semesters. There he attended lectures by Felix Klein on different fields of mathematics and worked in his seminar. He also attended lectures of Carl Neumann, Eduard Study, Wilhelm Killing and Georg Scheffers. At that time Klein was dealing with deep problems of algebra and theory of functions of a complex variable. Following his suggestion, Molien started to study linear transformations of elliptic functions. The obtained results he submitted to the Faculty of Physics and Mathematics of the University of Dorpat as a master thesis titled "Ueber die lineare Transformation der elliptischen Functionen". In spring 1885 Molien passed the master's exams and after the defence in the autumn of 1885 he obtained the scientific degree of a Master of Mathematics. In November 1885 he became a docent at the University of Dorpat. This position he held for 15 years.

Summers (that were free from teaching) of 1886, 1888 and 1889 Molien spent in scientific centers of Germany. His interest concentrated on so-called higher complex numbers (nowadays called hypercomplex numbers). His studies resulted in his article "Über Systeme höherer komplexer Zahlen" ("On systems of higher complex numbers"), published in 1891 in Mathematische Annalen.

On 30 September 1892, Molien defended his dissertation, also titled "Über Systeme höherer komplexer Zahlen". He got the degree of a doctor of pure mathematics. The importance of his work was acknowledged by Georg Frobenius, Sophus Lie and other mathematicians. One of the main results of his dissertation sounds in modern terms as follows: every simple associative algebra over the field of complex numbers is isomorphic to the algebra of square matrices of a suitable order over the same field.

For his scientific achievements, in 1892 Molien was elected a member of Moscow Mathematical Society. In 1894 French mathematicians awarded him a golden medal dedicated to the seventieth birthday of Charles Hermite. During Dorpat years, Molien had mathematical correspondence with Frobenius and Hurwitz.

Since the University of Dorpat had only one professorship in pure mathematics, Molien had to stay for years at docent's position. Being a docent in Dorpat, Molien prepared and gave different lecture courses: Theory of analytic and elliptic functions, modern geometry and algebra, theory of algebraic equations, number theory, projective geometry, theory of quaternions, history of mathematics and others. Some of these courses were new for the university.

In 1887 Russian powers decided to change the language of secondary and higher education in Baltic governorates from German to Russian with the deadline 1 January 1895. With the purpose of improving his Russian language, Molien was sent to Moscow for the year 1892.

=== Career in Tomsk ===
Only in December 1900 Molien was given a professor's position, but not in Dorpat, but in the starting Tomsk Technological Institute in Siberia. He became the first professor of mathematics in Siberia. His was given a task of organizing teaching mathematics at the institute. In Tomsk, besides giving courses in mathematical analysis and differential equations, he wrote textbooks and exercise books on these subjects, and also established a mathematical library at the institute.

Known for his oppositional political views, he had to retire in 1913. Since 1914, Molien was a professor at higher Siberian courses for women in Tomsk, and when in 1917 the faculty of physics and mathematics was opened at the Tomsk State University, he got a professorship there, and stayed at that university until his death on 25 December 1941.

In Tomsk Molien spent 41 years of his life. These years were scientifically not as fruitful as earlier years.

He got the title of Honoured Worker of Science.

== Works ==
- Bahn des Cometen 1880 III (candidates thesis), Astron. Nachr. Bd. 105, No. 2519.
- Ueber Systeme höherer complexer Zahlen: eine behufs Erlangung des Grades eines Doctors der reinen Mathematik der physico-mathematischen Fakultät der Kaiserl. Universität Dorpat (dissertation), Tartu, 1892. (full text)
- Ueber die lineare Transformation der elliptischen Functionen: eine zur Erlangung des Grades eines Magisters der Mathematik der physico-mathematischen Facultät der Kaiserlichen Universität Dorpat (master's thesis), Tartu, 1885, 23 pp.

== Other interests ==
Molien was interested in chess. In 1897-1898 he was in correspondence with a leading Russian chess player Mikhail Chigorin. He was one of the strongest chess players in Dorpat and was particularly known for his blindfold play (Ken Whyld, personal communication, 1995). He was president of the Dorpat chess club, and several of his games were published in the chess journal Baltische Schachblätter (edited by Friedrich Amelung). In 1898 Molien published four chess studies.

To 1895 dates his manuscript "On theory of assigning prizes in tournaments".

Molien had also talent for languages. He knew German, Estonian, French, Swedish already before he entered gymnasium where he learned Greek, Hebrew, Latin, English, Italian. Later he learned Spanish, Portuguese, Dutch, and Norwegian.

== See also ==
- Molien series
- List of Baltic German scientists
