= Eduard Georg von Wahl =

Baltic German surgeon

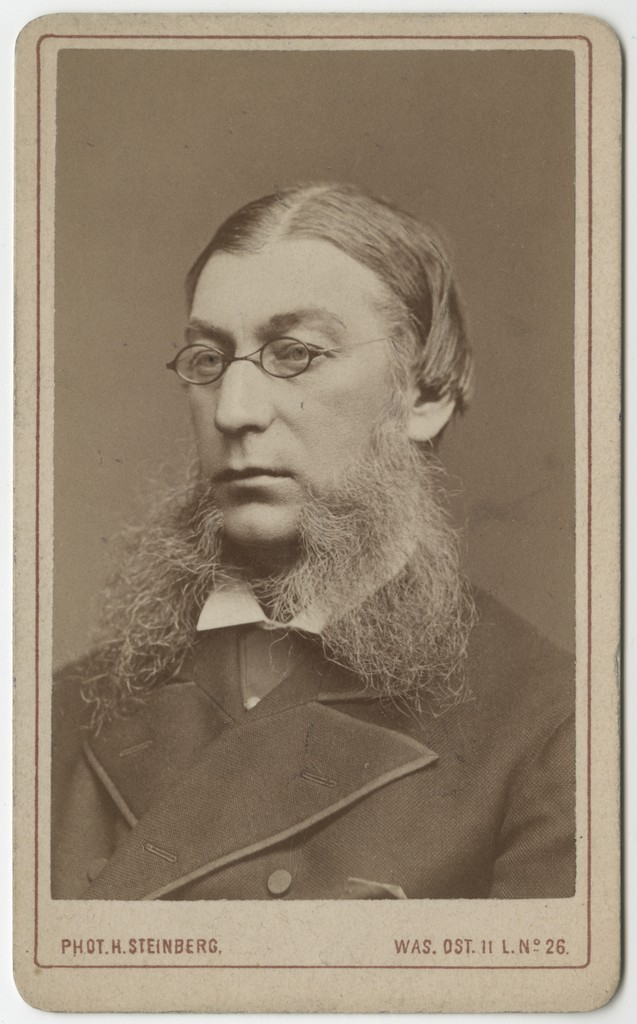
- Born: 3 March [O.S. 19 February] 1833; Wattel, Governorate of Estonia, Russian Empire
- Died: 29 January [O.S. 17 January] 1890; Dorpat
- Education: Imperial University of Dorpat
- Occupation: Surgeon

Eduard Georg von Wahl (3 March [O.S. 19 February] 1833 in Wattel – 29 January [O.S. 17 January] 1890 in Dorpat) was a Baltic German surgeon.

He was born in Wattel (now Valta, Pärnu County, Estonia) in the Governorate of Estonia . In 1859 he obtained his doctorate from the Imperial University of Dorpat, where he was a student of Friedrich Bidder (1810-1894) and Hermann Guido von Samson-Himmelstjerna (1809-1868). He continued his education in Berlin and Paris, and in 1860 relocated to St. Petersburg, where he opened a private medical practice and worked as a hospital surgeon. From 1867 he was head surgeon at the Prinz Peter von Oldenburg children's hospital. In 1878 he became a professor of surgery at Dorpat, where he served as university rector from 1881 to 1885.

In addition to his surgical duties, he was at the forefront in the fight against leprosy, mental illness and sexually transmitted diseases from a public and medical standpoint.

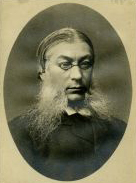
Eduard Georg von Wahl, Rector of the University of Tartu in 1881–1885

== Written works ==
- Ueber Fracturen der Schädelbasis (On fractures at the base of the skull), in Richard von Volkmann's "Sammlung Klinischer Vorträge, Nr. 228, (1883)
- Krankheiten der Knochen und Gelenke (Diseases of bones and joints), in Carl Gerhardt's Handbuch der Kinderkrankheiten, VI. Bd. 2. Abth. S. 396. 2.
