= Johann Heinrich Baumann =

Baltic-German artist

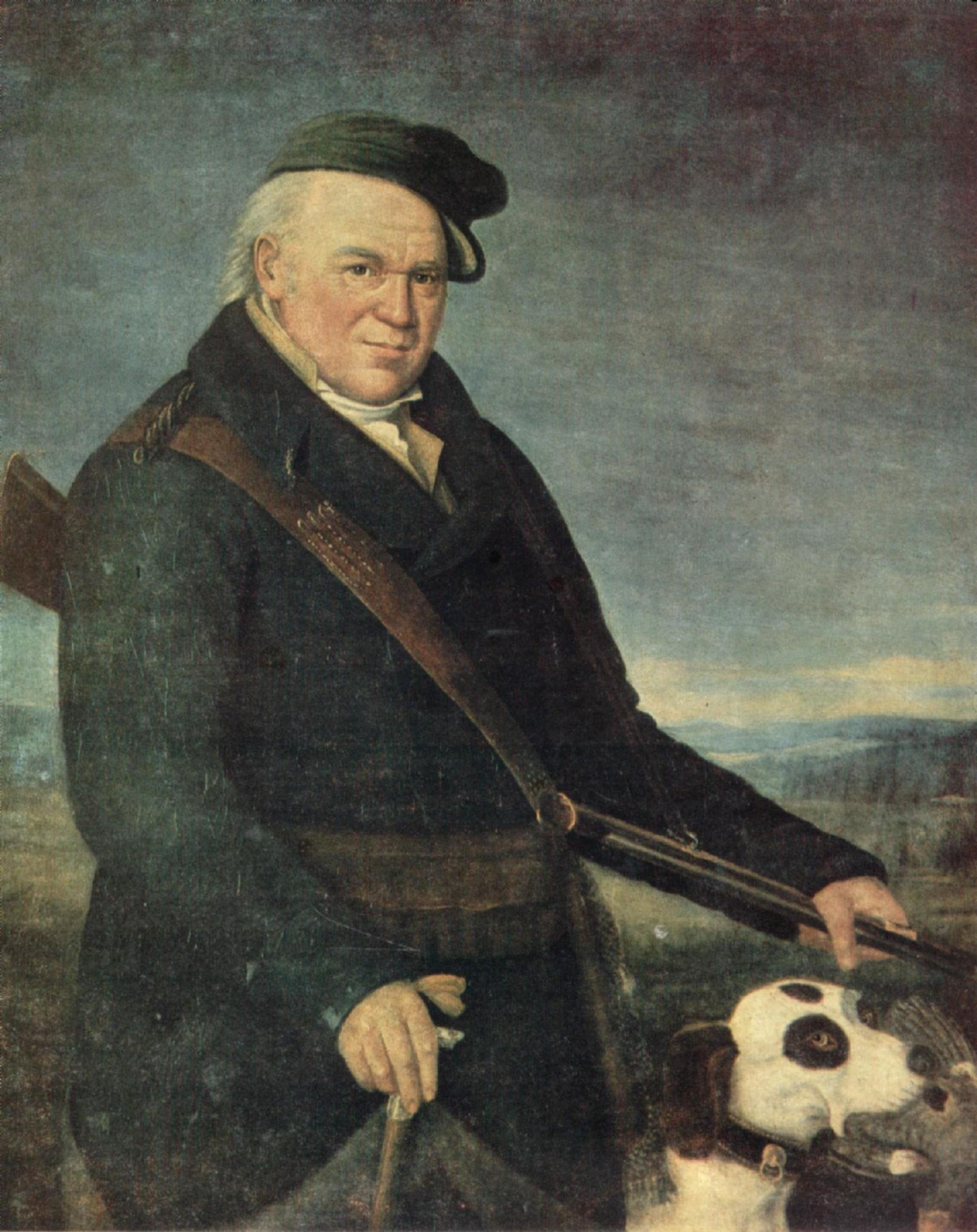
- Baumann, self-portrait
- Born: 9 February 1753; Mitau, Duchy of Courland and Semigallia
- Died: 29 July 1832 (aged 79)
- Education: University of Erfurt
- Occupation: Painter
- Writing career
- Period: Baroque
- Subject: Hunting scenes

Johann Heinrich Baumann (Latvian: Johans Heinrihs Baumanis; 9 February 1753 – 29 July 1832) was a Baltic German artist who mainly lived and worked in what is today Latvia.

== Early life and education ==
Johann Heinrich Baumann was born in Jelgava (German: Mitau) into a German-speaking family. He was the son of the pastor and general superintendent of Mitau, Joachim Baumann.

== University ==
Baumann went to University of Erfurt to study theology in 1773–1776. However, in Erfurt he took up painting, under the influence of Jacob Samuel Beck (1715–1778), a notable local painter specialising in animal portraits in the then-prevailing Baroque style. After his studies, Baumann returned to his Baltic homeland Courland but would henceforth pursue a career as an artist and not as a priest.

== Travels ==
Being a keen hunter, Baumann travelled as far as present-day Lithuania, Russia and Belarus on hunting expeditions. He also wrote anecdotal, whimsical short stories about his hunting adventures, for which he has been called the "Munchausen of Courland". His outdoors interests also came to dominate his art completely, which is an unusual blend of skillfulness and professionalism mixed with naivety and slovenliness. Almost all his known paintings depict animals, hunting scenes or related subjects. His style is perhaps best characterised as a provincial form of Baroque, inspired to some extent by similar motives in Dutch Golden Age painting, executed in a highly personal way. Although he never became recognised as a major artist in Imperial Russia, he was still acknowledged by a special mention of the Imperial Academy of Arts in 1786. He is reputed to have painted over 1700 paintings, however only 43 surviving paintings are safely attributed to him today.

== Playwriting ==
Baumann was also one of the first authors in present-day Latvia to write plays for the stage in Latvian.

== See also ==
- List of Baltic German artists
