= Karl Wilhelm von Kupffer =

Baltic German anatomist (1829–1902)

Ritter Karl Wilhelm von Kupffer
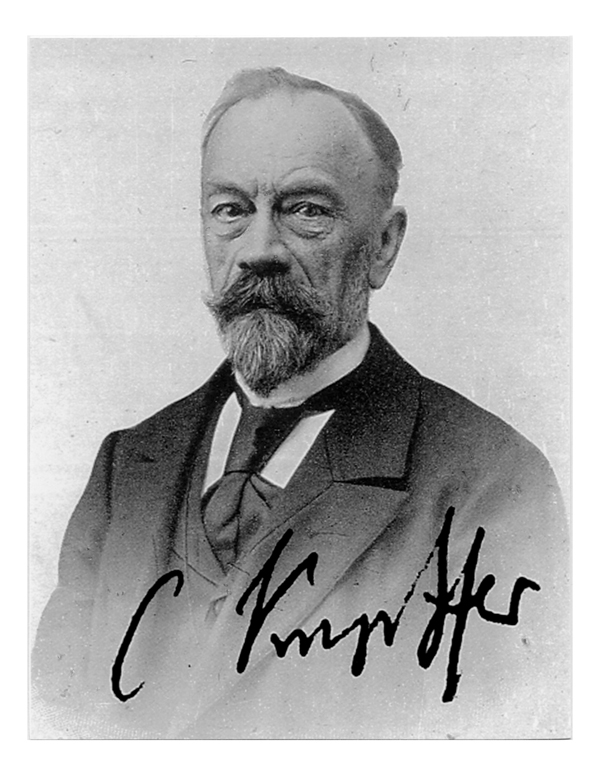
- Born: Karl Wilhelm Kupffer; 14 November [O.S. 2 November] 1829; Lesten, Courland Governorate, Russian Empire
- Died: 16 December 1902 (aged 73); Munich, Kingdom of Bavaria, German Empire
- Education: Imperial University of Dorpat
- Scientific career
- Fields: physiology and anatomy
- Workplaces: Kiel University; University of Königsberg
- Doctoral advisor: Emil Du Bois-Reymond; Johannes Peter Müller; Friedrich Bidder

Karl Wilhelm Ritter von Kupffer (born Karl Wilhelm Kupffer; 14 November [O.S. 2 November] 1829 – 16 December 1902) was a Baltic German anatomist who discovered stellate macrophage cells that bear his name.

== Academic career ==
He was the eldest son of pastor Karl Hermann Kupffer (1797–1860). In 1854, he obtained his medical doctorate from the Imperial University of Dorpat, where shortly afterwards he served as an assistant to Friedrich Heinrich Bidder (1810–1894). In 1856–1857 he took a scientific journey to Vienna, Berlin and Göttingen, an extended trip in which he studied physiology with Emil Du Bois-Reymond (1818–1896) and Johannes Peter Müller (1801–1858). Afterwards, he returned to Dorpat, where he later became an associate professor.

In 1866 he was appointed chair of anatomy at Kiel University, and several years later relocated to the University of Königsberg (1875) as a professor of anatomy. From 1880 until his retirement in 1901, Kupffer held the chair of anatomy at the Ludwig-Maximilians-Universität München.

== Scientific research ==
Kupffer is largely known for his work in the fields of neuroanatomy and embryology. He conducted studies on the development of the brain, spleen, pancreas and kidneys, also performing research involving innervation of exocrine gland and doing investigations on early differentiation of mesoderm. While Bidder's assistant at Dorpat, he studied structures of the central nervous system, and during his tenure at Königsberg, he had the opportunity to examine the cranium of philosopher Immanuel Kant.

In regards to his discovery of "Kupffer cells" in 1876, he initially suggested that this type of cell belonged to a group of perivascular cells (pericytes) of the connective tissues or to the adventitial cells. Two decades later (1898), he revised his earlier analysis, stating that the cells form an essential component of the vascular walls and correlate to the specific cells of endothelium, capable of phagocytising foreign materials. Shortly afterwards, pathologist Tadeusz Browicz (1847-1928) from Jagellonian University in Kraków, correctly identified them as macrophages.

== Selected works ==
- De medullae spinalis textura in ranis ratione imprimis habita indolis substantiae cinerae, 1854
- Der Schädel von Immanuel Kant, Archiv für Anthropologie, Band 13
- Über Sternzellen in der Leber, brief an Prof. Waldyer, 1876, Archiv, Mikroskopische Anatomie, 12, 352–358
- (with Berthold Benecke): Photogramme zur Ontogenie der Vogel, etc. 1879.
- Über die sogennanten Sternzellen der Säugethierleber, Archiv, Mikroskopische Anatomie, 1899, 54, 254–288
- Über Sternzellen der Leber, Versammlung 1898, Veröffentlicht 1898, anatomische Geselschaft.

== See also ==
- List of Baltic German scientists

== Sources ==
- This article contains information based on a translation of an equivalent article at the German Wikipedia.
- "Купфер, Карл Вильгельм" . Brockhaus and Efron Encyclopedic Dictionary (in Russian). 1906.
- Porträt, Mit (1903). "Karl v. Kupffer". Archiv für Mikroskopische Anatomie. 62: 669–718. doi:10.1007/BF02985556. S2CID 88453516.
