= Vatla Airfield =

Airfield in Estonia

Vatla Airfield (Estonian: Vatla lennuväli; or Vatla Highway Strip) was an airfield in Vatla, Lääne County, Estonia. The airfield was a backup airfield for Soviet Air Force. The airfield belonged to the military command of the Soviet Baltic Fleet aviation forces, rather than the general Soviet Air Force.

The airfield's length was 2500 m and it was covered with concrete/asphalt.
