= Jean Alexander Heinrich Clapier de Colongue =

Russian engineer (1838–1901)

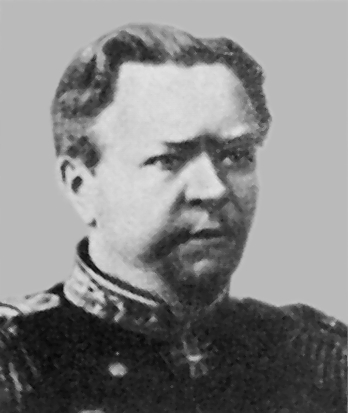
- Jean Alexander Heinrich Clapier de Colongue
- Born: 6 March [O.S. 22 February] 1838; Dünaburg, Vitebsk Governorate, Russian Empire (now Daugavpils, Latvia)
- Died: 26 May [O.S. 13 May] 1901; Saint Petersburg, Russia
- Occupation: Engineer
- Known for: Theory of magnetic deviation for magnetic compasses

Jean Alexander Heinrich Clapier de Colongue (Russian: Ivan Petrovich de-Kolong; Иван Петрович де-Колонг; Latvian: Johans Aleksandrs Heinrihs Klapje de Kolongs) (6 March [O.S. 22 February] 1838–26 May [O.S. 13 May] 1901) was a Baltic German marine engineer and founder of a theory of magnetic deviation for magnetic compasses, living and working in Imperial Russia.

== Biography ==
Ivan Petrovich de Collong was born in 1839 in Dünaburg (now Daugavpils) into a Baltic German noble family originally of Franco-Portuguese origin. He studied at the Naval Academy in Saint Petersburg and from 1870 he worked there as a lecturer. Starting in 1878 he was head of the Navy's Main Hydrographical Administration. In 1875, he constructed a deflector (a new type of compass baffle) and later improved upon its design.

De Collong was a Corresponding Member of the Russian Academy of Sciences (from 1896) and a Major-General of the Imperial Russian Navy. He was awarded the Lomonosov Prize by the Russian Academy of Sciences.

== See also ==
- List of Russian inventors
- List of Baltic German scientists
