= Bidder's organ =

Endocrine organ found in true toads

Bidder's organ is a spherical, brownish organ in most members of the family Bufonidae (true toads). The organ is located just in front of the kidney, or mesonephros. It is formed at the cranial tip of the male and female gonad during the larval stage. Its main function appears to be endocrine, taking part in regulating sex hormones.

Normally, it contains miniature egg follicles which have the capability to mature (becoming active). Zoologists have experimented with the physiology of the organ by castrating male toads (removing the testicles). In doing so, the Bidder's organ enlarges and produces viable oocytes (egg cells). Only rudimentary oviducts are developed, though, preventing eggs from actually being laid. The Bidder's organ only develops into an ovary analogue when testicles are removed experimentally or not functioning properly (e.g. due to exposure to endocrine-disrupting chemicals). Importantly, females can have Bidder's organs in addition to true ovaries, which suggests that the Bidder's organ might not be a rudimentary ovary.

It is named in honour of Friedrich Bidder.

== Anatomy ==
The organ's internal anatomy consists of two parts; the central portion, consisting of connective tissue and rich in blood vessels, and its periphery, consisting of the cortex, which contains follicles in various stages of development. Molecules of various proteins are present in the outer layer of the follicles, homologous to the zona pellucida of the ovum. The physiology of the Bidder's organ is unique, having no connection with temperature-dependent sex determination (i.e., reptiles, avians, and mammals).
