= Vatla =

Village in Estonia

Coordinates: 58°34′N 23°44′E

- Village
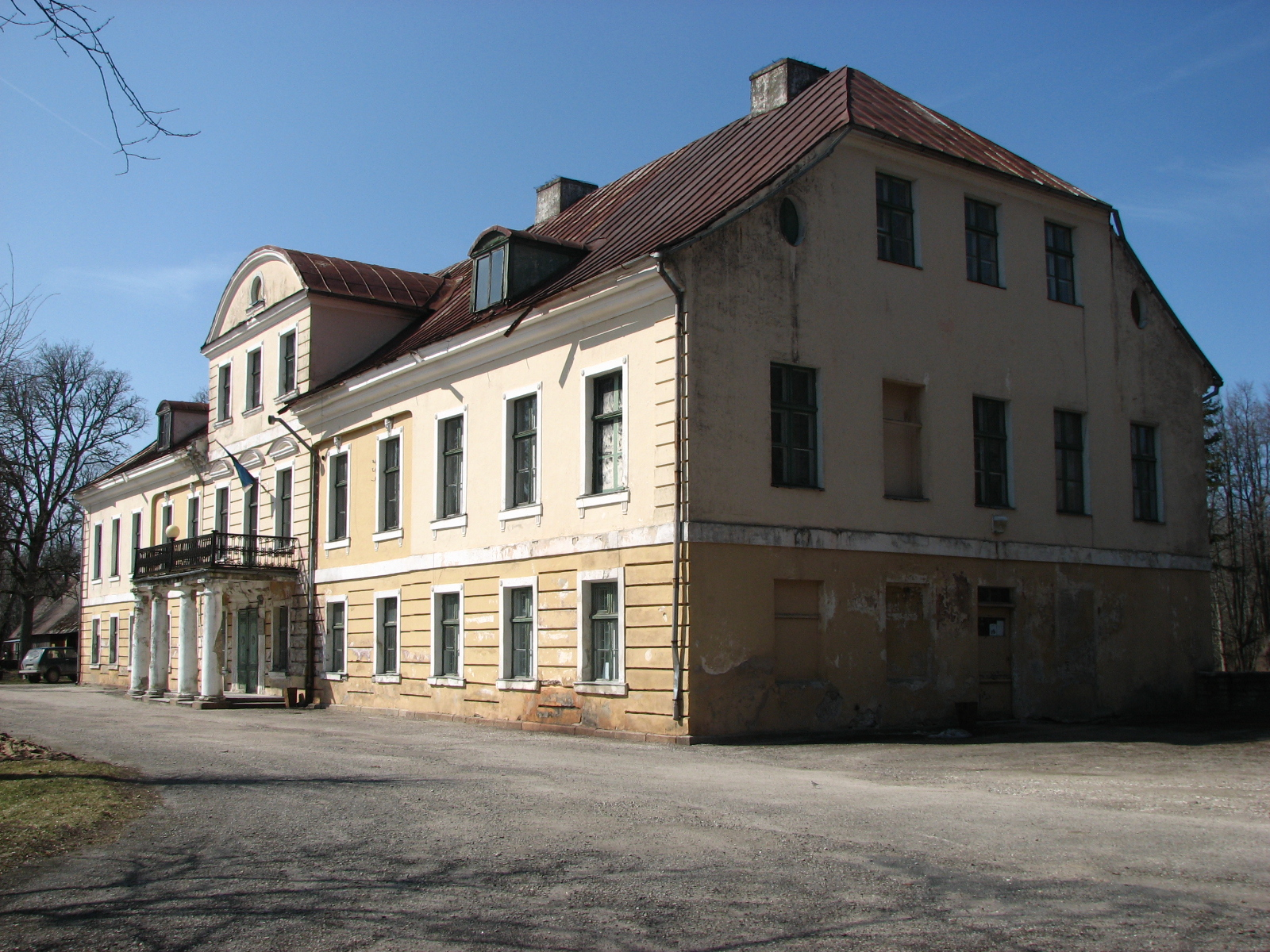
- Vatla manor
- Interactive map of Vatla
- Country: Estonia
- County: Pärnu County
- Parish: Lääneranna Parish
- Time zone: UTC+2 (EET)
  - Summer (DST): UTC+3 (EEST)

Vatla (German: Wattel) is a village in Lääneranna Parish, Pärnu County, in western Estonia.

The surgeon Eduard Georg von Wahl (1833–1890) was born in Vatla.

== Vatla manor ==
Vatla manor was first mentioned in the late 16th century. It became the property of Swedish noble family Bielke but was later taken over by the Swedish state through one of the so-called reductions. Later, it again came into the hands of various Baltic German aristocratic families. The current building dates from around 1810, and there are still some rather typical neoclassicist interior details preserved, such as a painted frieze and a cocklestove. Following the land reform that was enacted when Estonia gained its independence in 1919, the manor was transformed into a school.

== See also ==
- Vatla Airfield
