= Arnoldo Sartorio =

German composer

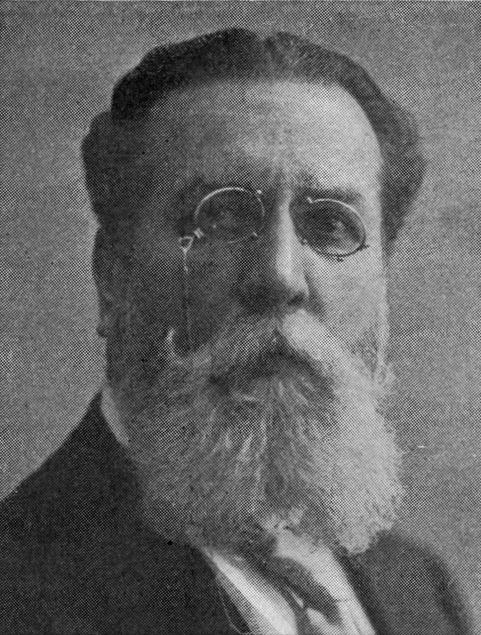
- Sartorio, as published in The Etude (1912)
- Born: Arnold Gabriel Holland Sartorio; 30 March 1853; Frankfurt, Hesse, Kingdom of Prussia
- Died: 15 February 1936 (aged 82); Krefeld, North Rhine-Westphalia, Germany
- Occupations: Composer; Choral conductor; Piano teacher

Arnold Gabriel Holland Sartorio (30 March 1853, in Frankfurt – 15 February 1936 in Krefeld) was a German composer, choral conductor, and piano teacher of the Romantic period. His musical output lay almost entirely in the genre of salon music pioneered by Sigismond Thalberg among others and transcended by Frédéric Chopin and Franz Liszt.

Exceptionally prolific, Sartorio composed works for over 1,200 opus numbers, his reaching of Opus 1,000 being documented in the magazine The Etude. While virtually unknown today, he was remembered by past audiences chiefly for pedagogical pieces written for his piano students to play. Many of these were issued under pseudonyms, which include Felix Durand, T. Devrient, Arthur Dana, Carlotta Bocca, Christian Schäfer, and Victor Abelle.

== Life ==
=== Early years ===
Of Italian descent, Sartorio was born in Frankfurt to Joseph Sartorio and Charlotte Wilhelmine Marie Sophie Katharine Ruegemer. His siblings included Gaetano Carl Alexander (born 1846), Clara Felicie Octavia (1856–1936), and Adolphine Josephine Felicie (1856–1936). Sartorio's teachers were August Buhl (1824–1868) and Eduard Mertke (1833–1895).

=== Career ===
According to Cooke (1912, p. 628), Sartorio was "a choir conductor in Strassburg, Düsseldorf and Cologne. He also taught many successful pupils."

Sartorio died in Krefeld, Germany in 1936.

== Music ==
Among Sartorio's most popular compositions were the Drei Jagdszenen [Three Hunting Scenes], Op. 173 (published 1894). Vierzehn Melodische Etüden [Fourteen Melodic Studies], Op. 214 (published 1895); Bilder aus der Märchenwelt [Pictures from the Fairy World], Op. 205 (published 1896); and Bilder aus der Jugendzeit [Pictures from Youth], Op. 233 (published 1896).

=== Reception ===
Contemporaneous critical opinions of Sartorio's music were that it was attractive and cleverly written.
