= Kurt Zoege von Manteuffel =

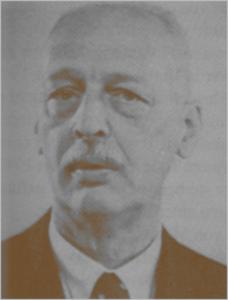
Kurt Zoege von Manteuffel

Kurt Nikolai Zoege von Manteuffel (8 August 1881 – 10 January 1941) was a Baltic German art historian.

Kurt Zoege von Manteuffel was born in present-day Tallinn, Estonia (then part of the Russian Empire) and spent his childhood in Estonia. His father belonged to the Baltic nobility and his mother was Danish. He studied in Kassel and Königsberg and at the universities in Munich, Halle and Berlin. In 1909 he earned his doctoral degree; his dissertation was about Pisanello. He worked 1909–10 at the Suermondt-Ludwig-Museum in Aachen and the following three years as a member of the editorial board of an art encyclopaedia. Later he worked at the Kunsthistorisches Institut in Florenz, but volunteered to fight in World War I and was severely wounded in 1918. The following year he took up work in Dresden and in 1924 he became director of the Kupferstich-Kabinett there. He died in 1941 in Chojnice.

Zoege von Manteuffel's main area of expertise was Dutch and Flemish painting and 19th century graphic art.
