= Isidorus Brennsohn =

Latvian physician and historian (1854–1928)

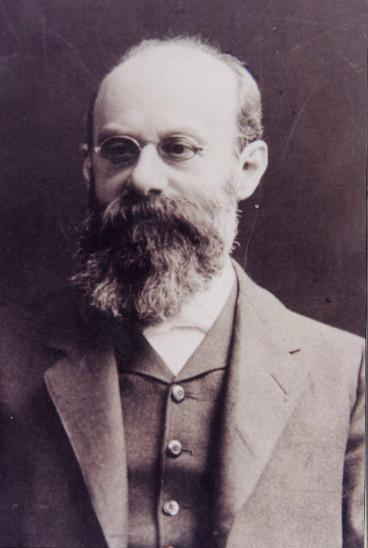
Isidorus Brennsohn

Isidorus Brennsohn (27 September 1854 – 31 December 1928) was a medical doctor and biographer, active mainly in pre-WWII Latvia.

== Biography ==
Isidorus Brennsohn was born in a Jewish family in Jelgava, where he also spent most of his early life. Between 1875 and 1881, he studied medicine at the University of Tartu, and received his doctor's degree in medicine from the same university in 1883. For some years, he was a provincial doctor in Subate in southern Latvia, before moving back to his hometown of Jelgava where he had his practice from 1885 to 1907. In parallel, he continued his studies and made several journeys abroad to study at universities in Germany and Austria. In 1907, he moved to Riga and worked for the rest of his life there as a doctor. During World War I, he served at a military hospital in the city.

Isidorus Brennsohn was also a historian of medicine and wrote the earliest biographical dictionary in the present-day Baltic states, Biographien baltischer Aerzte. Published in three volumes from 1902, it contains biographical information about doctors and physicians working in the present-day Baltic states, as well as essays on the historical development of medicine in the Baltic area. His biographical dictionaries, published in the beginning of the 20th century, are still in print and available.

== Works ==
- Zur Anthropologie der Litauer. Dorpat, 1883
- Zur Casuistik der Myositis ossificans multiplex (progressiva). Berliner klinische Wochenschrift 29, ss. 1163-1165 (1892)
- Ueber die Frühsymptome und die heutige Behandlung der tuberculösen Wirbelentzündung. St. Petersburger medizinische Wochenschrift 18, ss. 463-468 (1901)
- Die Aerzte Kurlands von 1825–1900. Mitau, 1902
- Ein Fall von Einrenkung der vordern Schulterluxation nach Riedel. Berliner klinische Wochenschrift 40, s. 281, 1903
- Die Tuberkulinbehandlung der chronischen Lungenschwindsucht; Bemerkungen. St. Petersburger medizinische Wochenschrift 32, ss. 191-199, 1907
- Die Beziehungen der Rückgratsverkrümmungen zur Schule. St. Petersburger medizinische Wochenschrift 35, ss. 281-285, 1910
- Brennsohn, Isidor: Die Ärzte Kurlands vom Beginn der herzoglichen Zeit bis zur Gegenwart ein biographisches Lexikon; nebst einer historischen Einleitung über das Medizinalwesen Kurlands. (2 Ausg). Riga, 1929
- Die Aerzte Livlands von den ältesten Zeiten bis zur Gegenwart ein biographisches Lexikon; nebst einer Einleitung über das Medizinalwesen Livlands. Mitau, 1905
- Die Aerzte Estlands vom Beginn der historischen Zeit bis zur Gegenwart ein biographisches Lexikon; nebst einer historischen Einleitung über das Medizinalwesen Estlands. Riga, 1922
- Zwei Fälle von chronischer ankylosierender Wirbelversteifung. Münchener Medizinische Wochenschrift 69, ss. 117; 787, 1922
- I. Brennsohn: Auszüge aus seinen "Erinnerungen an die Studienjahre in Dorpat 1875 - 81". Eesti Arst 12, 1927
- Sketches of My Life, Especially of my Youth.
