= Albrecht Wagner =

German physician and surgeon

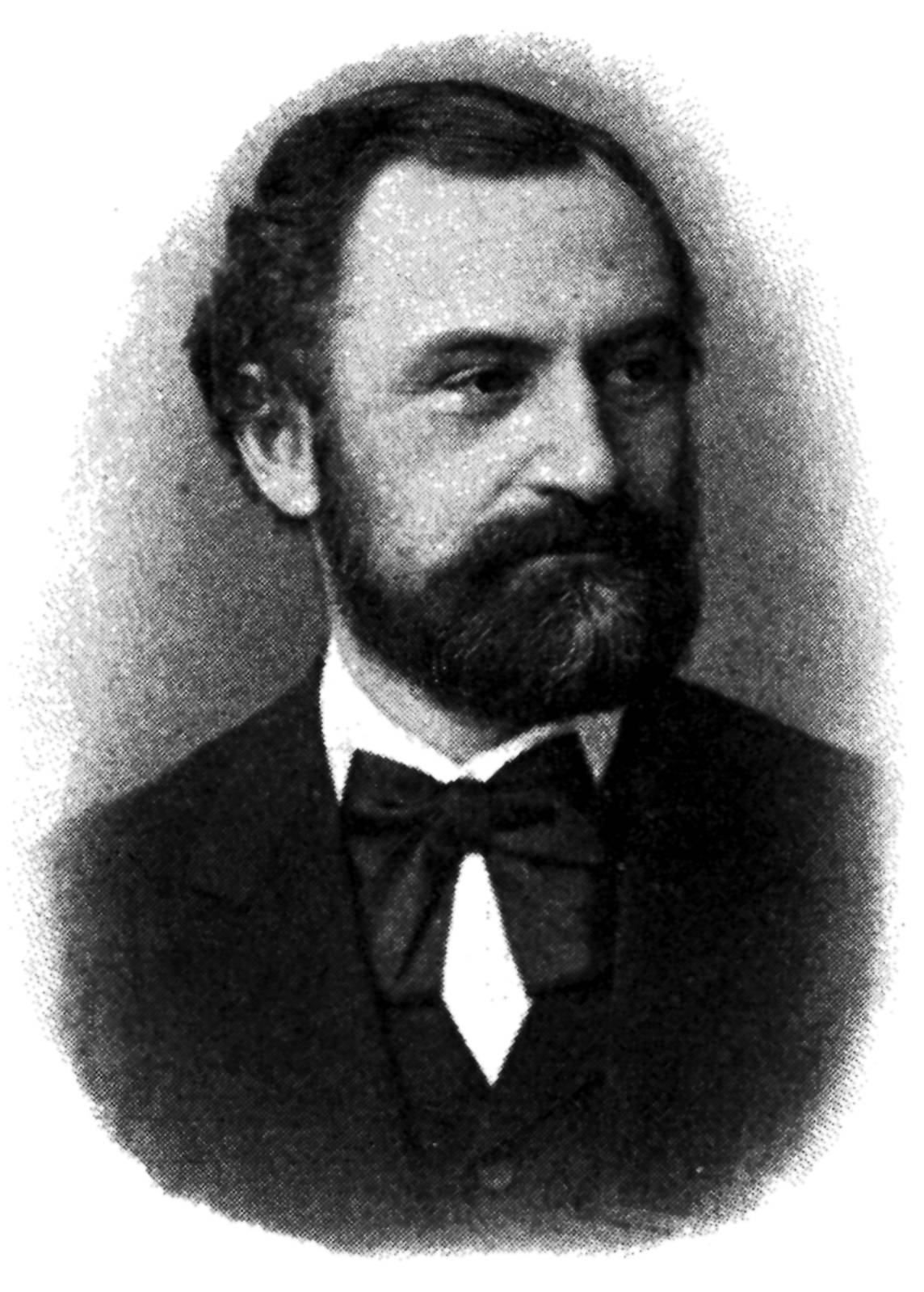
Karl Ernst Albrecht Wagner

Karl Ernst Albrecht Wagner (3 June 1827 in Berlin – 15 February 1871 in Dôle) was a German medical doctor and surgeon.

He studied medicine at the universities of Berlin and Heidelberg, receiving his doctorate in 1848 with the dissertation-thesis "De Spatulariarum anatome". He served as a military physician during the First Schleswig War, then in 1849–50 participated in a study tour to Paris and Vienna. Afterwards, he returned to Berlin as an assistant to surgeon Bernhard von Langenbeck. In 1852 he qualified as a lecturer, and during the following year was named a senior physician at the city hospital in Danzig.

In 1858 he was appointed a professor of surgery at the University of Königsberg and a director of the surgical clinic. In 1866 he was named vice-rector of the university. He served as a general physician and consultant surgeon in the Austro-Prussian War. He held a similar position in the Franco-Prussian War, during which, he died from typhus at a field hospital in Dôle, France.

His treatise on the resection of bones and joints was translated into English and published by the New Sydenham Society in a work titled: "Selected monographs" (1859). The book also included treatises written by Adolph Kussmaul, Adolf Tenner and Albrecht von Graefe.
