= Casa Sartorio =

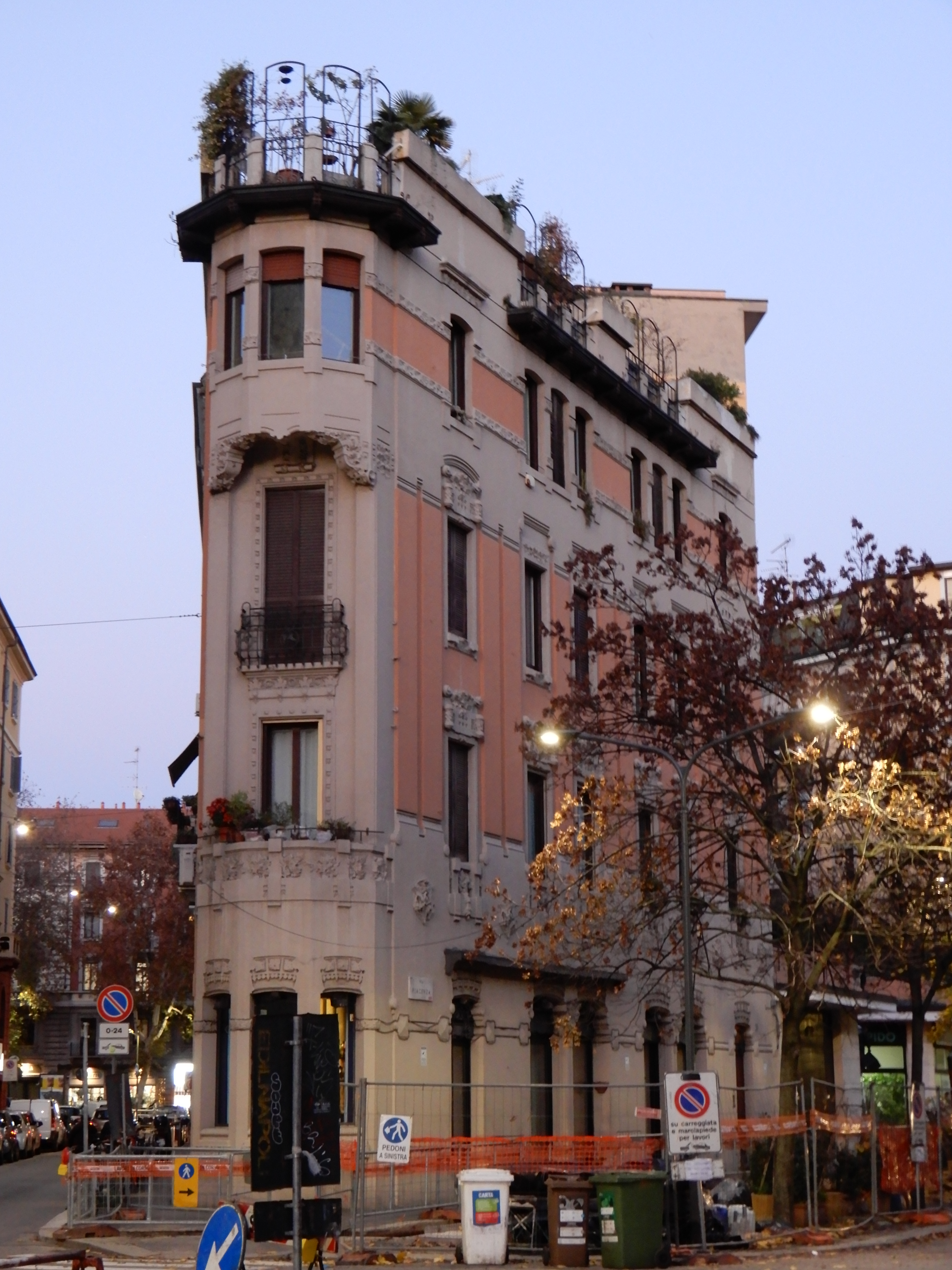
- Casa Sartorio in Milan
- Click on the map for a fullscreen view

General information
- Architectural style: Art Nouveau
- Location: Milan, Italy
- Coordinates: 45°26′58.05″N 9°12′18.12″E

Design and construction
- Architect(s): Enrico Provasi

Casa Sartorio is a historic building situated in Milan, Italy.

== History ==
The building was designed by architect Enrico Provasi and built in 1909.

== Description ==
The building is located on a triangular-shaped lot at the corner of Via Piacenza and Via Gian Carlo Passeroni, not far from Porta Romana. The façades, characterized by a strong sense of verticality, feature elegant Art Nouveau decorations. However, the distinctive element of the building is the corner façade with triphorated bay windows on the ground floor and the top floor, and balconies on the two floors in between.
