= Drolma Kyi =

Tibetan Singer and prisoner in the 2008 Tibetan Unrest

Drolma Kyi is a Tibetan singer. She was arrested on March 30, 2008 by the Chinese authorities, during the 2008 Tibetan unrest.

At the end of May, she was released after almost two months of detention on conditions of silence on her arrest and of not more to do representations during some times.

== See also ==
- Political prisoner
