= Christian Nikolai Richard Pohle =

Christian Nikolai Richard Pohle (Russian: Рихард Рихардович Поле, romanized: Rikhard Rikhardovich Pole; 5 August 1869 – 4 August 1926) was a Baltic German botanist.

== Life and work ==
Born in Riga, he studied in Germany and earned his doctorate degree from Dresden University of Technology. 1905–1916 he worked at Saint Petersburg Botanical Garden. He undertook scientific journeys to Novaya Zemlya and Siberia. In 1916, he was under threat of deportation to Siberia but managed to flee the country on snowshoes through northern Finland to Norway. He spent the rest of his life in Germany.
