= Carl Hiekisch =

Baltic German geographer

Carl Wilhelm Hiekisch (15 May [O.S. 3 May] 1840 in Reval – 20 December [O.S. 7 December] 1901 in Reval) was a Baltic German geographer working in the Russian Empire.

== Life and work ==
Carl Hiekisch was born in Reval (now Tallinn, Estonia) and studied in Saint Petersburg and Dorpat (now Tartu, Tartu County, Estonia). In 1882, he received his doctoral degree in geography from the Imperial University of Dorpat. From 1867 until 1900 he worked as a teacher in Saint Petersburg, teaching first German but later geography. He travelled widely in Scandinavia, Germany, Switzerland, Italy, the Caribbean and South America, and published ethnographic and geographical works.

== Selected works ==
- Noch einmal die Streitfrage über das Wrangell-Land (1883)
- Das System des Urals : eine orographische Darstellung des europäisch-asiatischen Grenzgebirges (1883)
- Die Tungusen : eine ethnologische Monographie (1879)
