= Friedrich Bidder =

Baltic German physiologist (1810–1894)

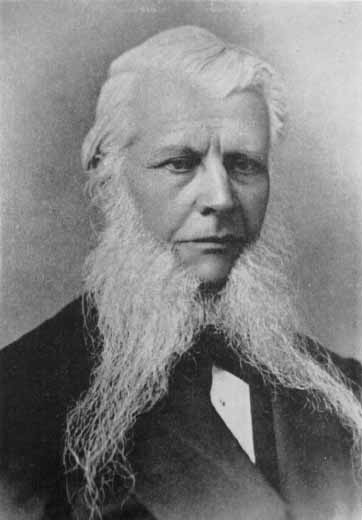
- Born: 9 November [O.S. 28 October] 1810; Treppenhof Manor, Governorate of Livonia, Russian Empire
- Died: 27 August [O.S. 15 August] 1894 (aged 83); Dorpat, Governorate of Estonia, Russian Empire
- Education: Imperial University of Dorpat
- Scientific career
- Fields: physiology and anatomy
- Workplaces: Imperial University of Dorpat
- Doctoral students: Karl Wilhelm von Kupffer

Georg Friedrich Karl Heinrich Bidder (9 November [O.S. 28 October] 1810 – 27 August [O.S. 15 August] 1894) was a Baltic German physiologist and anatomist from what was then the Governorate of Livonia in the Russian Empire.

In 1834 he received his doctorate from the Imperial University of Dorpat, where he became a professor of anatomy (1842), and physiology and pathology (1843). He was a corresponding member (1857) and honorary member (1884) of the Saint Petersburg Academy of Sciences (today Russian Academy of Sciences). He was the president of the Naturalists' Society at the University of Dorpat from 1877 to 1890.

Bidder is primarily remembered for his studies of nutrition and gastric physiology. From 1847 to 1852 he performed physiological-chemical studies of digestive juices and metabolism with chemist Carl Ernst Heinrich Schmidt (1822–1894). He also conducted important investigations of the sympathetic nervous system with Alfred Wilhelm Volkmann (1801–1877) and of the spinal cord with Karl Wilhelm von Kupffer (1829–1902).

Bidder's name is associated with two anatomical structures:

- "Bidder's ganglia": Ganglia located at the lower end of the atrial septum; sometimes called the ventricular ganglia.
- "Bidder's organ": A spherical, brownish reproductive organ of male toads.

== See also ==
- List of Baltic German scientists

| Preceded by Eduard Haffner | Rector of the Imperial University of Dorpat; 1858–1865 | Succeeded by Hermann Guido von Samson-Himmelstjerna |
