= Carl Schmidt (chemist) =

Baltic German chemist (1822–1894)

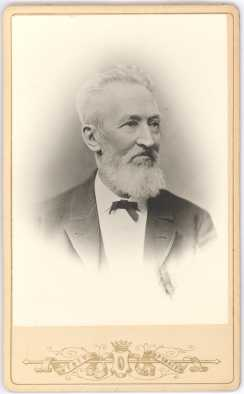
- Carl Schmidt
- Born: 13 June 1822; Mitau, Courland Governorate, Russian Empire (now Latvia)
- Died: 27 February 1894 (aged 71); Dorpat, Livonia Governorate, Russian Empire (now Estonia)
- Education: Justus Liebig University Giessen; Georg August University of Göttingen
- Scientific career
- Fields: Chemistry
- Workplaces: Imperial University of Dorpat
- Doctoral advisor: Justus von Liebig (Chemistry); Friedrich Wöhler (Medicine)
- Doctoral students: Wilhelm Ostwald; Gustav Tammann

Carl Ernst Heinrich Schmidt, also Karl Genrikhovich Schmidt (Russian: Карл Ге́нрихович Шмидт; 13 June [O.S. 1 June] 1822 – 11 March [O.S. 27 February] 1894) was a Baltic German chemist from the Livonia Governorate, Russian Empire.

== Biography ==
Schmidt received his PhD in 1844 from the University of Giessen under Justus von Liebig. In 1845, he first announced the presence in the test of some Ascidians of what he called "tunicine", a substance very similar to cellulose. Tunicine now is regarded as cellulose and correspondingly a remarkable substance to find in an animal.

In 1850, Schmidt had been named Professor of Pharmacy at the Imperial University of Dorpat and in 1851 he was appointed Professor of Chemistry in the mathematical and physical division on the University of Dorpat. He was a corresponding member (1873) of the Saint Petersburg Academy of Sciences (today Russian Academy of Sciences). He was the president of the Estonian Naturalists' Society in 1894. Schmidt is notable as the PhD advisor of the Nobel Prize winner Wilhelm Ostwald.

== Scientific work ==
Schmidt determined the typical crystallization patterns of many important biochemicals such as uric acid, oxalic acid and its salts, lactic acid, cholesterin, stearin, etc. He analysed muscle fibre and chitin. He showed that animal and plant cell constituents are chemically similar and studied reactions of calcium albuminates. He studied alcoholic fermentation and the chemistry of metabolism and digestion. He discovered hydrochloric acid in gastric juice and its chemical interaction with pepsin. He studied bile and pancreatic juices. Some of this work was done with Friedrich Bidder. He studied chemical changes in blood associated with cholera, dysentery, diabetes, and arsenic poisoning.

== Bibliography ==
- Bing, Franklin C. (1 May 1973). "Friedrich Bidder (1810–1894) and Carl Schmidt (1822–1894)–A Biographical Sketch" (PDF). The Journal of Nutrition. 103 (5): 637–648. doi:10.1093/jn/103.5.637. PMID 4575658.
- Gillispie, Charles Coulston, ed. (1970). Dictionary of Scientific Biography. Vol. 2. Charles Scribner's Sons. p. 124.
- Hall, D.A.; Saxl, Hedwig (1961). "Studies of Human and Tunicate Cellulose and of their Relation to Reticulin". Proceedings of the Royal Society of London B. 155 (959): 155, 202–217. Bibcode:1961RSPSB.155..202H. doi:10.1098/rspb.1961.0066. S2CID 85821623.
- Harmer, Sidney Frederic; Shipley, Arthur Everett (1904). "Hemichordata, Ascidians and Amphioxus, Fishes". The Cambridge Natural History. Vol. 7. Macmillan Company.
- Partington, J.R. (1964). A History of Chemistry. Vol. 4. Macmillan. pp. 306, 595.
- Ross, R. Stefan (2005). "Carl Schmidt – a chemical tourist in Victorian Britain". Endeavour. 29 (1): 33–37. doi:10.1016/j.endeavour.2005.01.006. PMID 15749151.
- Zaleski, St. Szcz (1894). "Carl Schmidt". Chem. Ber. 27 (4): 963–978. doi:10.1002/cber.18940270494.
- "Information about Carl Schmidt". www.ras.ru. Russian Academy of Sciences. 2002.
