= John Christian Bechler =

Moravian bishop, composer and organist

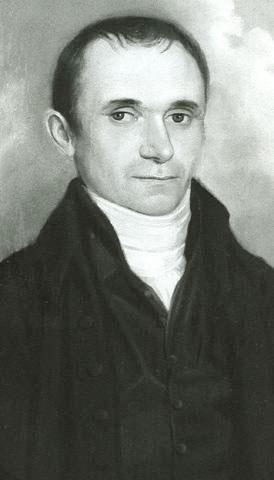
John Christian Bechler

John Christian Bechler (7 January 1784 in Oesel, Governorate of Livonia (present-day Estonia) – 18 April 1857 in Herrnhut, Saxony (present-day Germany)) was a Moravian bishop, composer, and organist.

== Biography ==
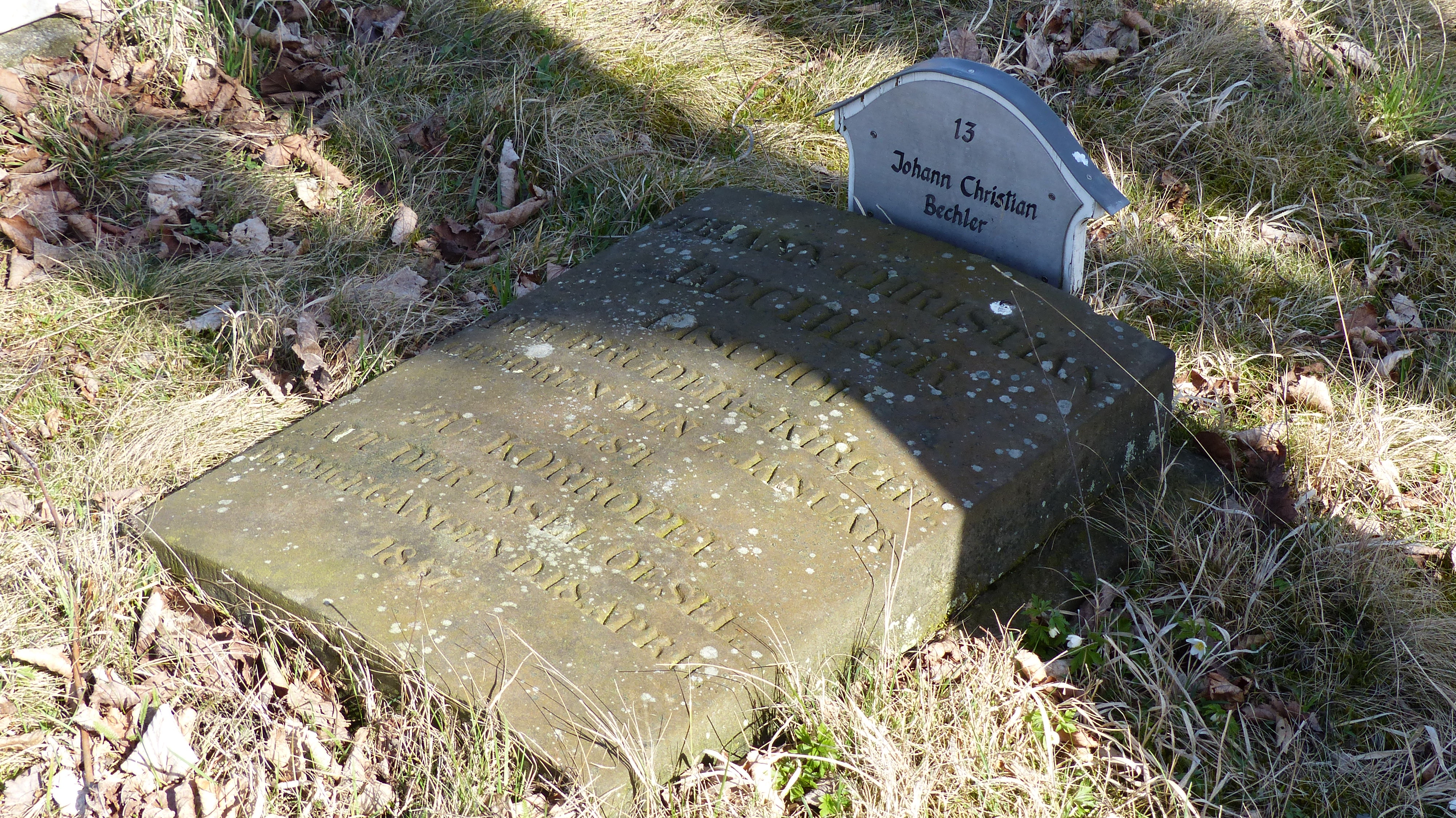
Grave of John Christian Bechler in Herrnhut

Bechler was educated at the Moravian school in Niesky, Germany and continued studies at the Theological Seminary in Barby, Germany. He was called to the United States in 1806 to teach at the boys school of Nazareth Hall, in Nazareth, Pennsylvania, as a tutor. In the following year the Moravian Theological Seminary was founded in Bethlehem, Pennsylvania, and he was appointed one of its first professors. In 1817 he accepted the principalship of Nazareth Hall, and subsequently had charge of various churches in Pennsylvania and on Staten Island. In 1829 Bechler was transferred to Salem in North Carolina, and presided over the Moravian work in the South (Wachovia Tract) around what is now Winston-Salem, North Carolina. He was consecrated to the episcopacy at Lititz, Pennsylvania, 17 May 1835. In the following year he went to Europe as a member of the general synod, and did not return, but was transferred to Russia, where he stood at the head of the Moravian establishment at Sarepta near Tsaritsyn until 1848, and subsequently was the principal of a similar establishment at Zeist, in the Netherlands.

Bechler was endowed with rare musical talent, and composed various anthems and tunes. In his memoir, he wrote that while studying at the seminary he "devoted every moment of time left by other duties, to the acquisition of the various branches of this charming art with the greatest delight, learning to sing, to play various stringed instruments, but more particularly the piano and the organ."

Before being called to the United States, Bechler would have been happy to stay at his teaching post in Barby where he "...might train many excellent organists." After his arrival in Pennsylvania he may have studied with David Moritz Michael, who was at that time the director of the Bethlehem Collegium Musicum. His known output, all written in the United States, includes thirty anthems with orchestral accompaniment, settings of liturgical texts, hymns, ariettas with keyboard accompaniment, and a few pieces for woodwinds.

Bechler is known as the composer of at least two hymn tunes, one which bears his name to the text "Sing Hallelujah, Praise the Lord" This tune which he called "Eternal Praise" was probably composed around 1812 has become known outside Moravian Church. With the exception of a few compositions in manuscript in collections at the Warsaw University Library, most of Bechler's are to be found in the Moravian archives in Herrnhut, Germany and in the collections of the Moravian Music Foundation in either Winston-Salem, NC or Bethlehem, PA. Several of Bechler's anthems have been edited and translated into English for modern performance.

Attribution:

- Wilson, J. G.; Fiske, J., eds. (1900). "Bechler, John Christian" . Appletons' Cyclopædia of American Biography. New York: D. Appleton.
- Basic biographical details are from J.C. Bechler's "Lebenslauf," printed in the Gemeine-Nachrichten, in 1857:7,545-558. This was translated into English in The Moravian, June 26, 1857.
- International holdings of Bechler's works according to RISM
