= Molien's formula =

Mathematical formula for generating function

In mathematics, Molien's formula computes the generating function attached to a linear representation of a group G on a finite-dimensional vector space, that counts the homogeneous polynomials of a given total degree that are invariants for G. It is named for Theodor Molien.

Precisely, it says: given a finite-dimensional complex representation V of G and $R_n = \mathbb{C}[V]_n = \operatorname{Sym}^n(V^*)$, the space of homogeneous polynomial functions on V of degree n (degree-one homogeneous polynomials are precisely linear functionals), if G is a finite group, the series (called Molien series) can be computed as:

$$\sum_{n=0}^{\infty} \dim(R_n^G) t^n = (\# G)^{-1} \sum_{g \in G} \det(1 - tg|V^*)^{-1}.$$

Here, $R_n^G$ is the subspace of $R_n$ that consists of all vectors fixed by all elements of G; i.e., invariant forms of degree n. Thus, the dimension of it is the number of invariants of degree n. If G is a compact group, the similar formula holds in terms of Haar measure.

== Derivation ==
Let $\chi_1, \dots, \chi_r$ denote the irreducible characters of a finite group G and V, R as above. Then the character $\chi_{R_n}$ of $R_n$ can be written as:

$$\chi_{R_n} = \sum_{i=1}^r a_{i, n} \chi_i.$$

Here, each $a_{i, n}$ is given by the inner product:

$$a_{i, n} = \langle \chi_{R_n}, \chi_i \rangle = (\# G)^{-1} \sum_{g \in G} \overline{\chi_i}(g) \chi_{R_n}(g) = (\# G)^{-1} \sum_{g \in G} \overline{\chi_i}(g) \sum_{|\alpha| = n} \lambda(g)^{\alpha}$$

where $\lambda(g)^{\alpha} = \prod_{i=1}^m \lambda_i(g)^{\alpha_i}$ and $\lambda_1(g), \dots, \lambda_m(g)$ are the possibly repeated eigenvalues of $g : V^* \to V^*$. Now, we compute the series:

$$\begin{align}
\sum_{n = 0}^{\infty} a_{i, n} t^n &= (\# G)^{-1} \sum_{g \in G} \overline{\chi_i}(g) \sum_{\alpha} (\lambda_1(g)t)^{\alpha_1} \cdots (\lambda_m(g)t)^{\alpha_m} \\
&= (\# G)^{-1} \sum_{g \in G} \overline{\chi_i}(g) (1 - \lambda_1(g)t)^{-1} \cdots (1 - \lambda_m(g)t)^{-1} \\
&= (\# G)^{-1} \sum_{g \in G} \overline{\chi_i}(g) \det(1 - tg|V^*)^{-1}.
\end{align}$$

Taking $\chi_i$ to be the trivial character yields Molien's formula.

== Example ==
Consider the symmetric group $S_3$ acting on R^{3} by permuting the coordinates. We add up the sum by group elements, as follows. Starting with the identity, we have

$$\det \begin{pmatrix} 1-t & 0 & 0 \\ 0 & 1-t & 0 \\ 0 & 0 & 1-t \end{pmatrix} = (1-t)^3$$.

There is a three-element conjugacy class of $S_3$, consisting of swaps of two coordinates. This gives three terms of the form

$$\det \begin{pmatrix} 1 & -t & 0 \\ -t & 1 & 0 \\ 0 & 0 & 1-t \end{pmatrix} = (1-t)(1-t^2) .$$

There is a two-element conjugacy class of cyclic permutations, yielding two terms of the form

$$\det \begin{pmatrix} 1 & -t & 0 \\ 0 & 1 & -t \\ -t & 0 & 1 \end{pmatrix} = \left(1 - t^3 \right) .$$

Notice that different elements of the same conjugacy class yield the same determinant. Thus, the Molien series is

$$M(t) = \frac 1 6 \left(\frac{1}{(1-t)^3} + \frac 3 {(1-t)(1-t^2)} + \frac{2}{1-t^3}\right)
= \frac{1}{(1-t)(1-t^2)(1-t^3)}.$$

On the other hand, we can expand the geometric series and multiply out to get

$$M(t) = (1 + t + t^2 + t^3 + \cdots)(1+ t^2 + t^4 + \cdots)(1 + t^3 + t^6 + \cdots)
= 1 + t + 2t^2 + 3t^3 + 4t^4 + 5t^5 + 7t^6 + 8t^7 + 10 t^8 + 12 t^9 + \cdots$$

The coefficients of the series tell us the number of linearly independent homogeneous polynomials in three variables which are invariant under permutations of the three variables, i.e. the number of independent symmetric polynomials in three variables. In fact, if we consider the elementary symmetric polynomials

$$\sigma_1 = x + y + z$$
$$\sigma_2 = xy + xz + yz$$
$$\sigma_3 = xyz$$

we can see for example that in degree 5 there is a basis consisting of $\sigma_3 \sigma_2$, $\sigma_3 \sigma_1^2$, $\sigma_2^2 \sigma_1$, $\sigma_1^3 \sigma_2$, and $\sigma_1^5$.

(In fact, if you multiply the series out by hand, you can see that the $t^k$ term comes from combinations of $t$, $t^2$, and $t^3$ exactly corresponding to combinations of $\sigma_1$, $\sigma_2$, and $\sigma_3$, also corresponding to partitions of $k$ with $1$, $2$, and $3$ as parts. See also Partition (number theory) and Representation theory of the symmetric group.)
