= Theodor Friedrich Julius Basiner =

Baltic German botanist (1816–1862)

Theodor Friedrich Julius Basiner (3 January 1816 – 14 October 1862) was a Baltic German botanist who lived and worked mainly in the Russian Empire.

== Life and work ==
Theodor Friedrich Julius Basiner was born in Tartu, present-day Estonia, and studied at the Imperial University of Dorpat between 1836 and 1840. In 1843 he became a conservator at the Botanical Garden in Saint Petersburg. He kept this position until 1845, when he became the institution's librarian. In 1849 he moved to a new position in Kiev, present-day Ukraine. In 1842–43 he made a scientific journey to Khiva in present-day Uzbekistan. He died in Vienna, Austria.

== Selected writings ==
- Naturwissenschaftliche Reise durch die Kirgisensteppe nach China
