= Gero von Wilpert =

German writer

Gero von Wilpert (13 March 1933 – 24 December 2009) was a German author, a senior lecturer in German at the University of New South Wales and, from 1980, Professor of German at the University of Sydney.

== Life and career ==
Wilpert was born in Tartu (Dorpat), Estonia. Like all Baltic Germans, he was forced to leave Estonia after the Molotov–Ribbentrop Pact and the takeover of the country by the Soviet Union (1939–40).

From 1953 to 1957 he studied at the University of Heidelberg, where he was at times a docent. He then settled near Stuttgart to work as independent author and lecturer.

Wilpert published several editions of an encyclopedia of literary descriptions Sachwörterbuch der Literatur. He also wrote a comprehensive Lexikon der Weltliteratur [Lexicon of World Literature] and earlier had published his Deutsche Literatur in Bildern [German Literature in Pictures] and a journal on Schiller.

He was elected a Fellow of the Australian Academy of the Humanities in 1983.

Wilpert died in Sydney.

== Books ==
- Sachwörterbuch der Literatur. Kröner, 1955; 8th revised edition, 2001, ISBN 3-520-23108-5.
- Lexikon der Weltliteratur. Kröner, 1963; 4th edition, 2004.
- Erstausgaben deutscher Dichtung. Joint author: Adolf Gühring. 1967; 2nd revised edition, 1992, ISBN 3-520-80902-8.
- Moderne Weltliteratur. Die Gegenwartsliteraturen Europas und Amerikas. Joint author: Ivar Ivask. Kröner, 1972, ISBN 3-520-43001-0.
- Deutsche Literatur in Bildern. Kröner, 1957; 2nd revised edition, 1975.
- Der verlorene Schatten. Kröner, 1978, ISBN 3-520-70101-4.
- Deutsches Dichterlexikon. Kröner, 1988, ISBN 3-520-28803-6.
- Die deutsche Gespenstergeschichte. Kröner, 1994, ISBN 3-520-40601-2.
- Goethe-Lexikon. Kröner, 1998, ISBN 3-520-40701-9.
- Schiller-Chronik. Sein Leben und Schaffen. 2000, ISBN 3-15-018060-0.
- Deutschbaltische Literaturgeschichte. C.H. Beck, München 2005, ISBN 3-406-53525-9.
- Die 101 wichtigsten Fragen: Goethe. C.H. Beck, München 2007, ISBN 978-3-406-55872-6.
- Die 101 wichtigsten Fragen: Schiller. C.H. Beck, München 2009, ISBN 978-3-406-58687-3.
