= Eduard Mertke =

Eduard Mertke (17 June 1833–25 September 1895) was a Baltic German composer.

== Life and work ==
Mertke was born in Riga in what was then the Russian Empire. He studied music in Riga, Saint Petersburg, Moscow and after 1853 in Leipzig under Albrecht Agthe. He may have made his first appearance before an audience as a pianist already at the age of ten, and by 1850 played in both Saint Petersburg and Moscow. From 1859 he travelled as a pianist and then worked as a piano teacher in present-day Germany until 1869 when he became professor at the conservatory at Cologne. He died in Riga.

He composed two operas, cantatas, pieces for piano, hymns, songs and also around 210 Ukrainian folk songs. He was also an editor of other composers' work and composed arrangements for other composers' music.
