= Minnie Peak =

Mountain in Washington (state), United States

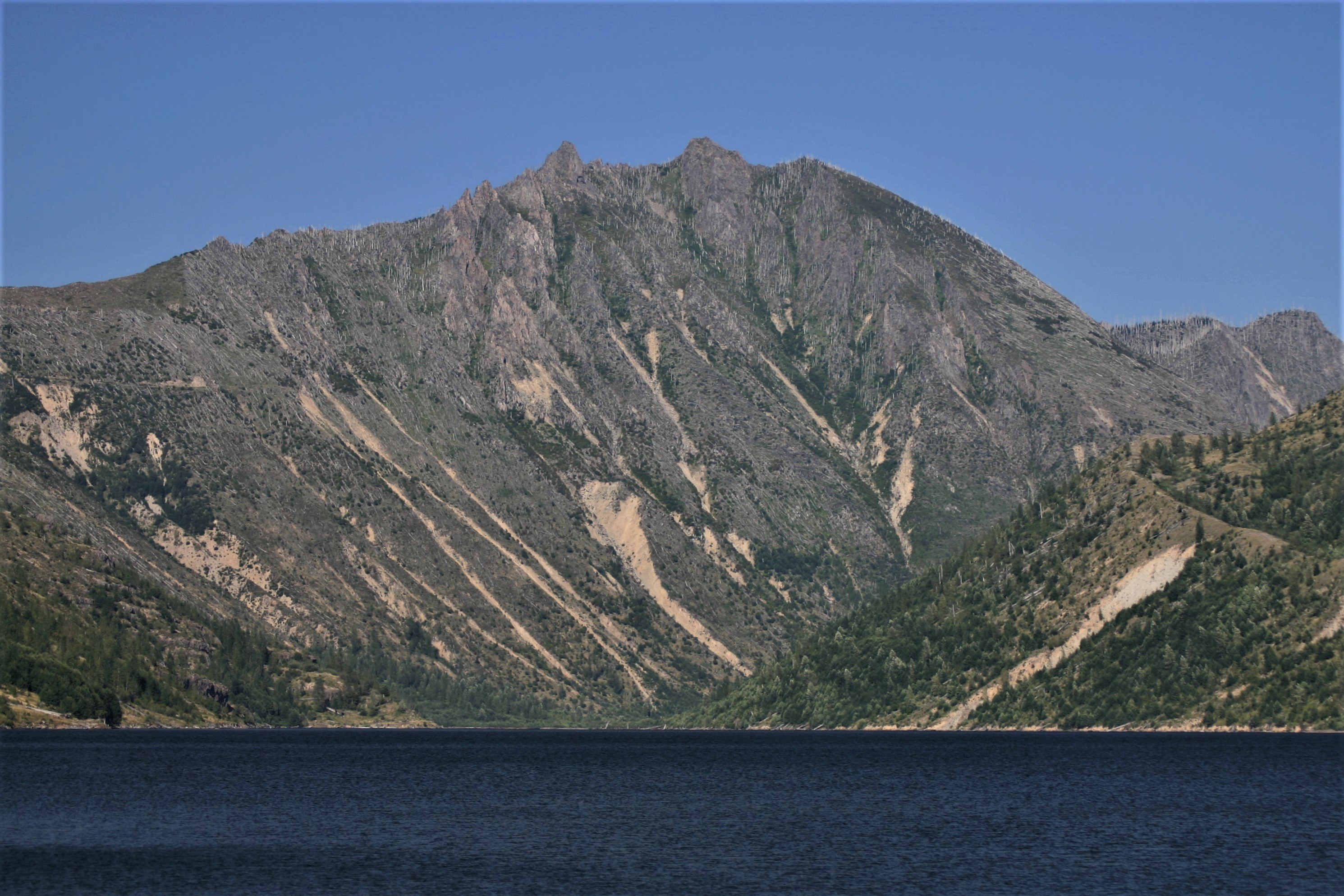
- West aspect, from Coldwater Lake

Highest point
- Elevation: 5,610 ft (1,710 m)
- Prominence: 890 ft (270 m)
- Parent peak: Mount Venus (5,820 ft)
- Isolation: 1.68 mi (2.70 km)
- Coordinates: 46°19′40″N 122°11′23″W

Geography
- Location within Washington (state) Location within the United States
- Country: United States
- State: Washington
- County: Skamania
- Protected area: Mount St. Helens National Volcanic Monument
- Parent range: Cascade Range
- Topo map: USGS Spirit Lake West

Geology
- Rock type: granodiorite
- Volcanic arc: Cascade Volcanic Arc

Climbing
- Easiest route: scrambling

Minnie Peak is a 5,610-ft (1,710 m) mountain summit located in Mount St. Helens National Volcanic Monument, in Gifford Pinchot National Forest, in Skamania County of southwest Washington state. It is situated in the Cascade Range, one mile northeast of Coldwater Lake, and 2.7 mi (4.3 km) west of Mount Whittier. Its nearest higher neighbor is Mount Venus, 1.67 mi (2.69 km) to the northeast, Coldwater Peak rises 2 mi (3.2 km) to the south, and Mount St. Helens is 9 mi (14 km) to the south. Although modest in elevation, relief is significant as the summit rises 3,000 feet above the Coldwater Creek valley in less than one mile. Precipitation runoff from Minnie Peak drains south into Coldwater Creek, or north into Miners Creek, both of which are part of the North Fork Toutle River drainage basin. This peak's name is derived from the Minnie mining claim nearby along Miners Creek. The primary minerals extracted there were silver and copper.

== Geology ==
The history of the formation of the Cascade Mountains dates back millions of years ago to the late Eocene Epoch. Geological events occurring many years ago created the diverse topography and drastic elevation changes over the Cascade Range leading to various climate differences. During the Pleistocene period dating back over two million years ago, glaciation advancing and retreating repeatedly scoured and shaped the landscape. With the North American Plate overriding the Pacific Plate, episodes of volcanic igneous activity occurred. The lateral blast from the 1980 eruption of Mount St. Helens was pointed toward Minnie Peak and stripped the vegetation from its slopes. Due to Mount St. Helens' proximity to Minnie Peak, volcanic ash is common in the area. Minnie Peak and nearby Mount Whittier are composed of resistant granodiorite of the Spirit Lake pluton, which is a complex of once-molten rock that intruded the surrounding rocks approximately 20 million years ago.

== Climate ==
Minnie Peak is located in the marine west coast climate zone of western North America. Most weather fronts originate in the Pacific Ocean, and travel northeast toward the Cascade Mountains. As fronts approach, they are forced upward by the peaks of the Cascade Range (Orographic lift), causing them to drop their moisture in the form of rain or snowfall onto the Cascades. As a result, the west side of the Cascades experiences high precipitation, especially during the winter months in the form of snowfall. During winter months, weather is usually cloudy, but due to high pressure systems over the Pacific Ocean that intensify during summer months, there is often little or no cloud cover during the summer. The months July through September offer the most favorable weather for viewing or climbing this peak.

== See also ==
- Geology of the Pacific Northwest
- List of mountain peaks of Washington (state)

== Gallery ==
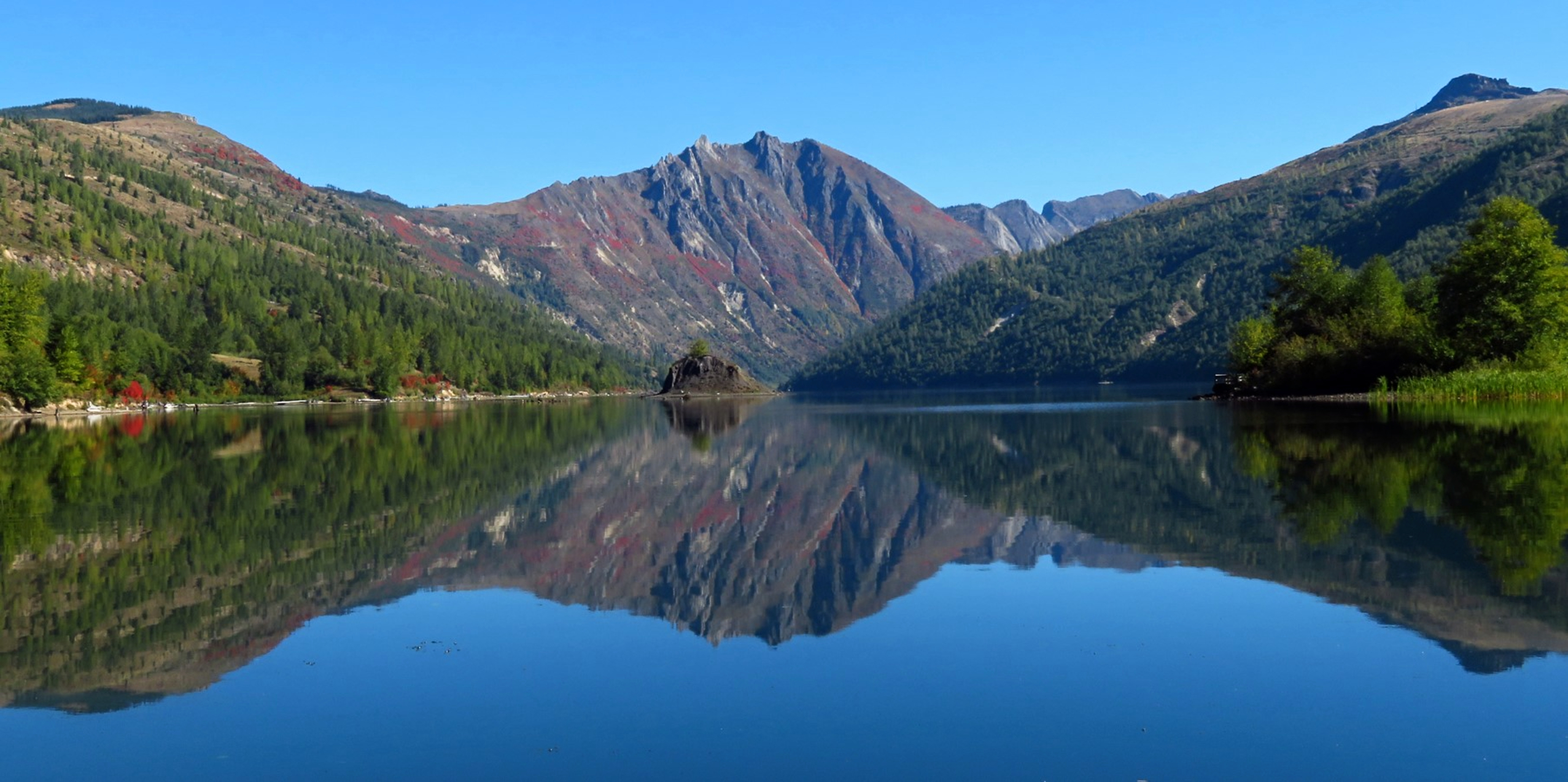
Minnie Peak reflected in Coldwater Lake

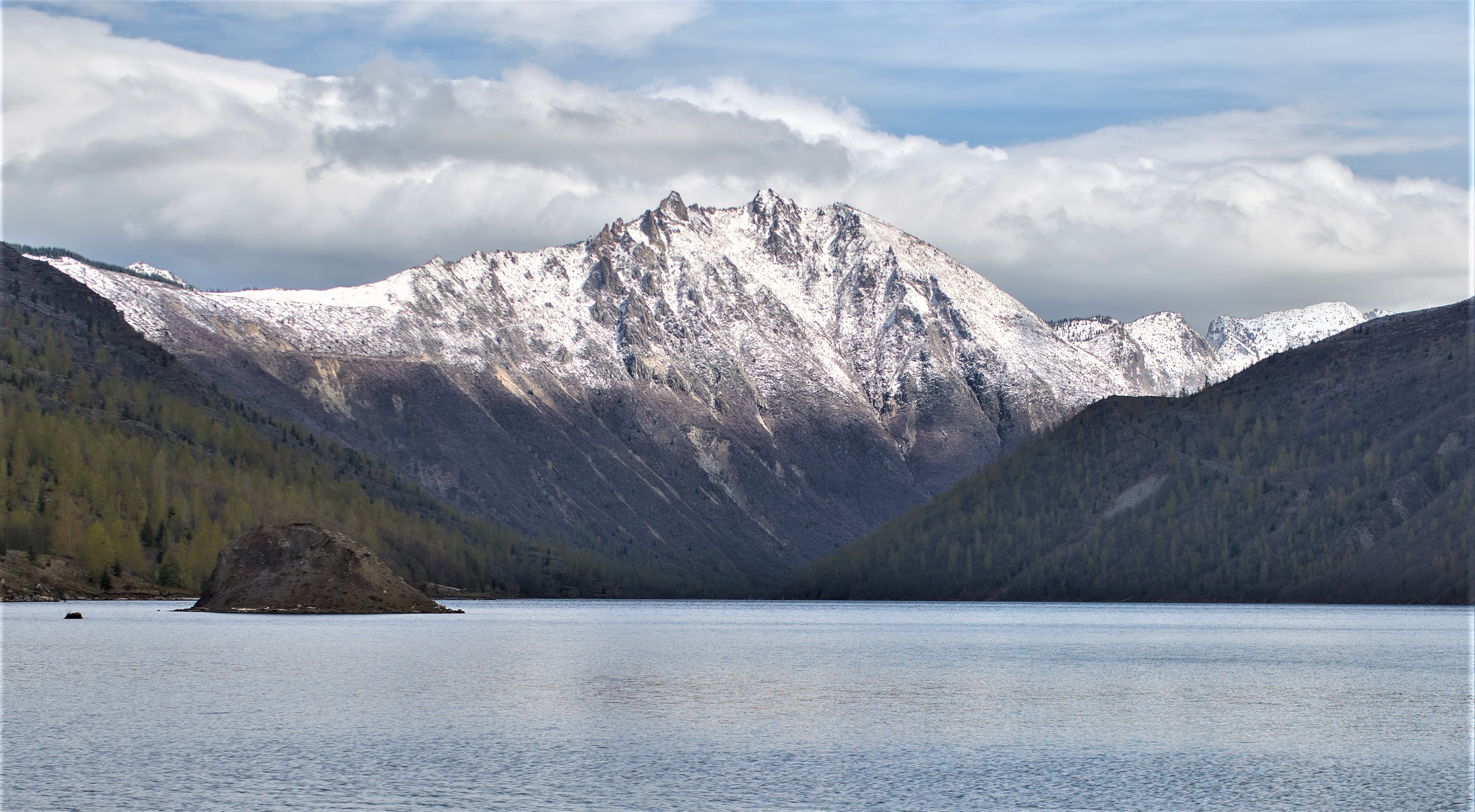
Minnie Peak and Coldwater Lake

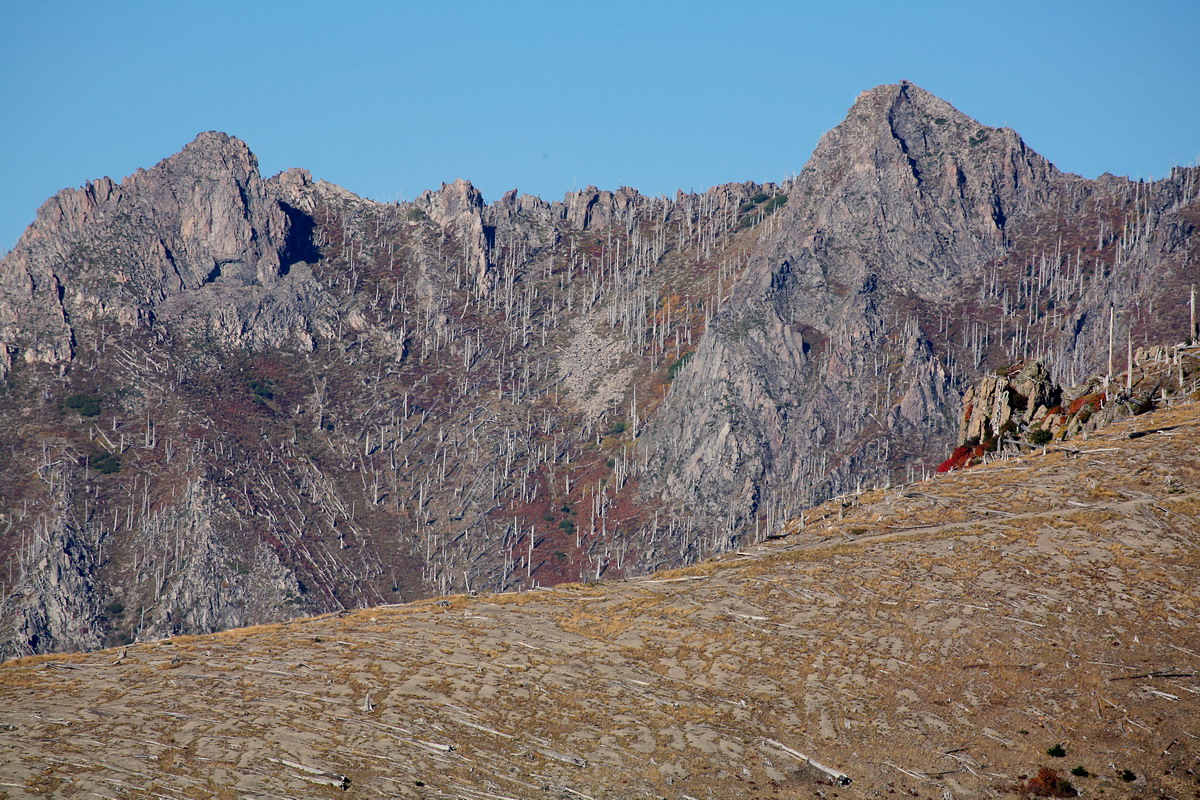
Summit detail

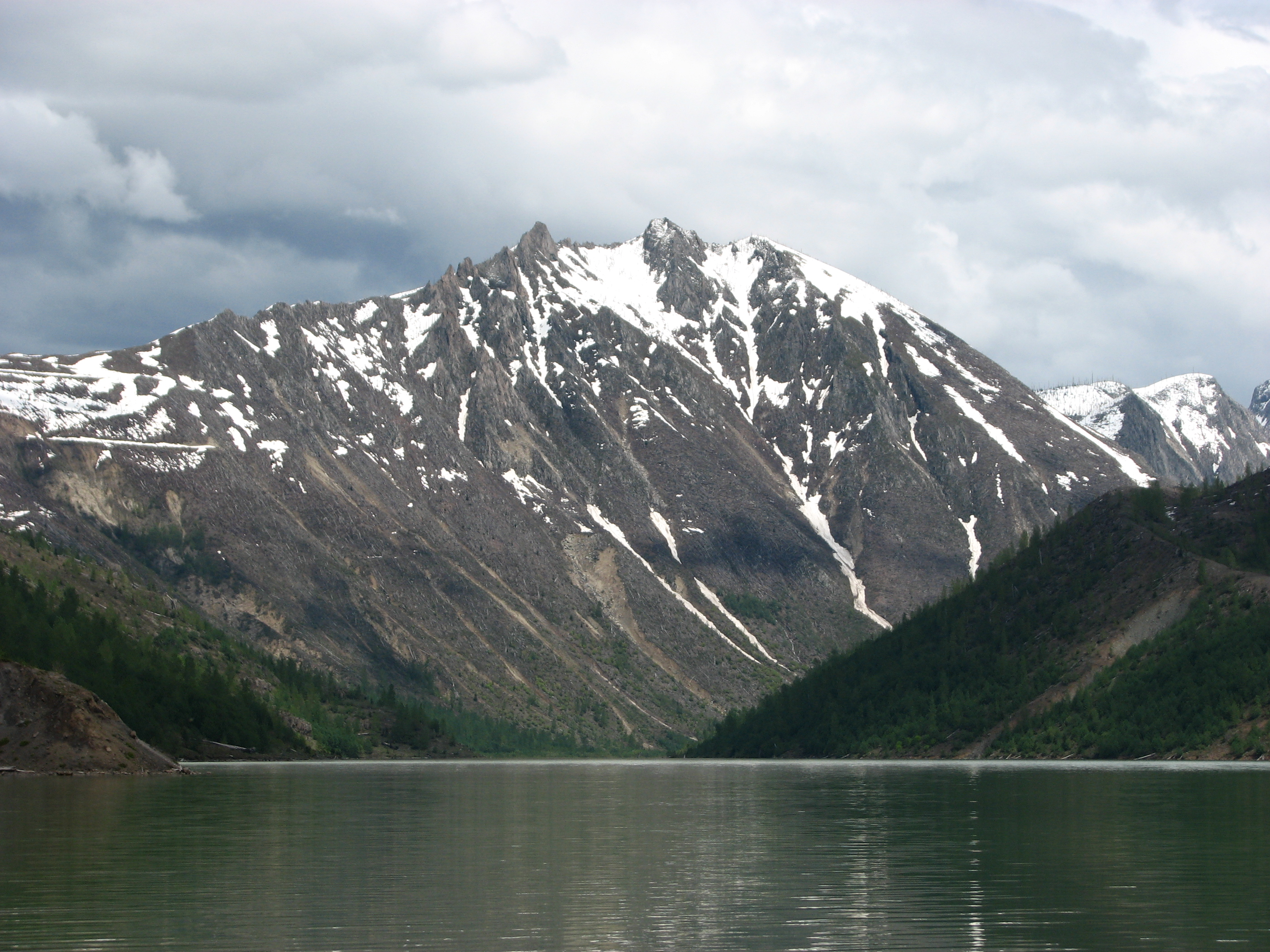
Minnie Peak and Coldwater Lake

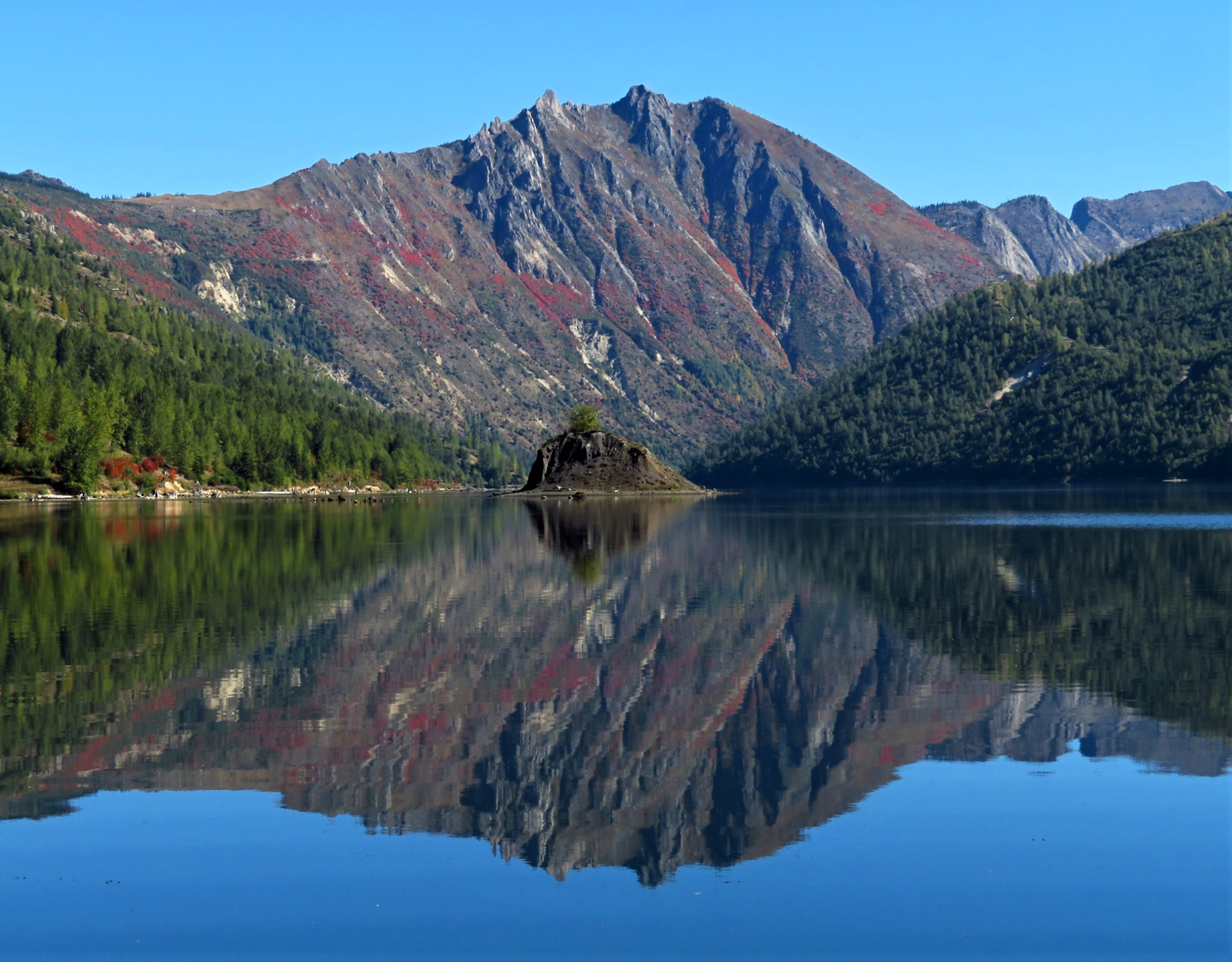

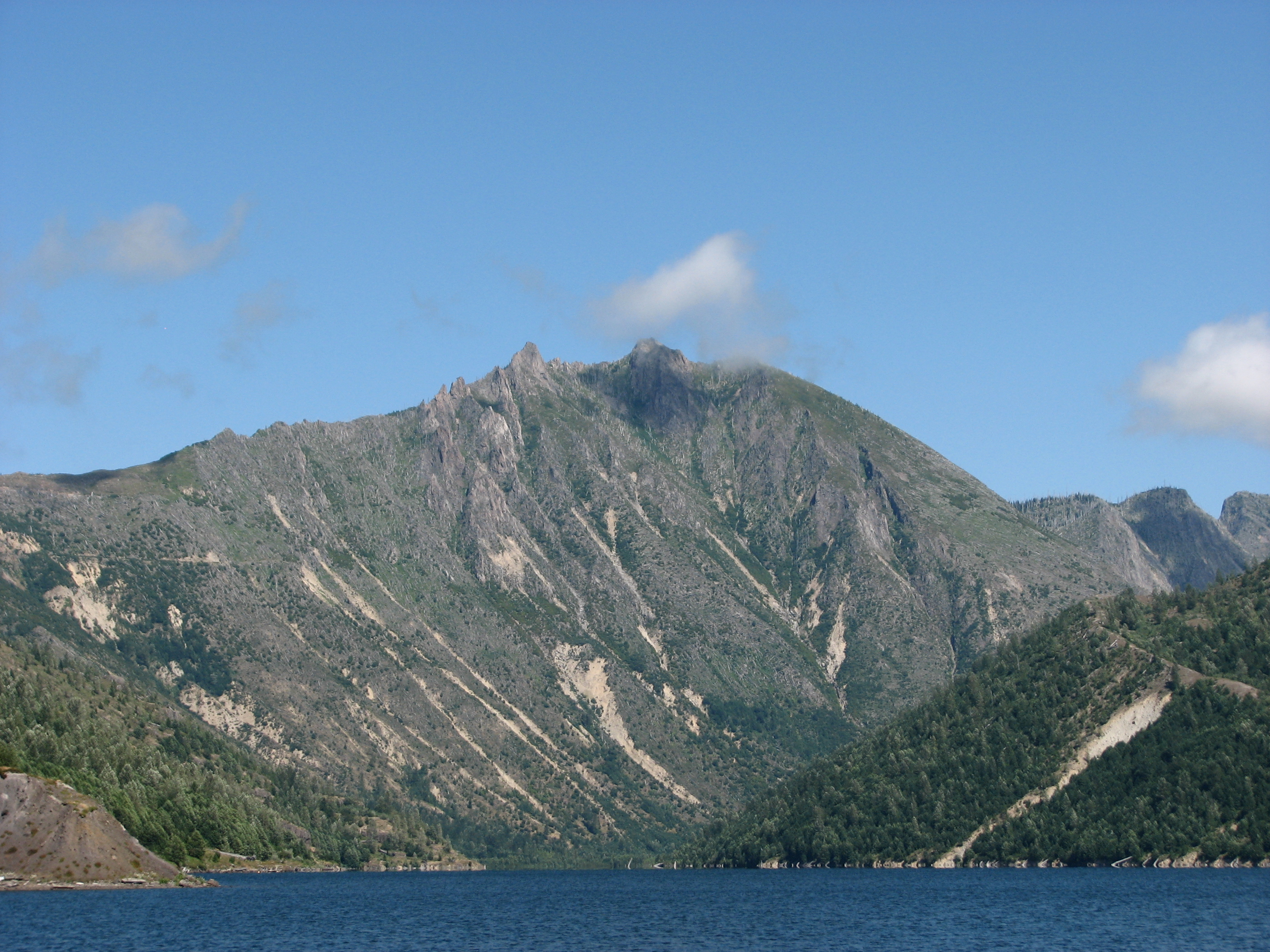
