= Mount Whittier (Washington) =

Mountain in Washington (state), United States

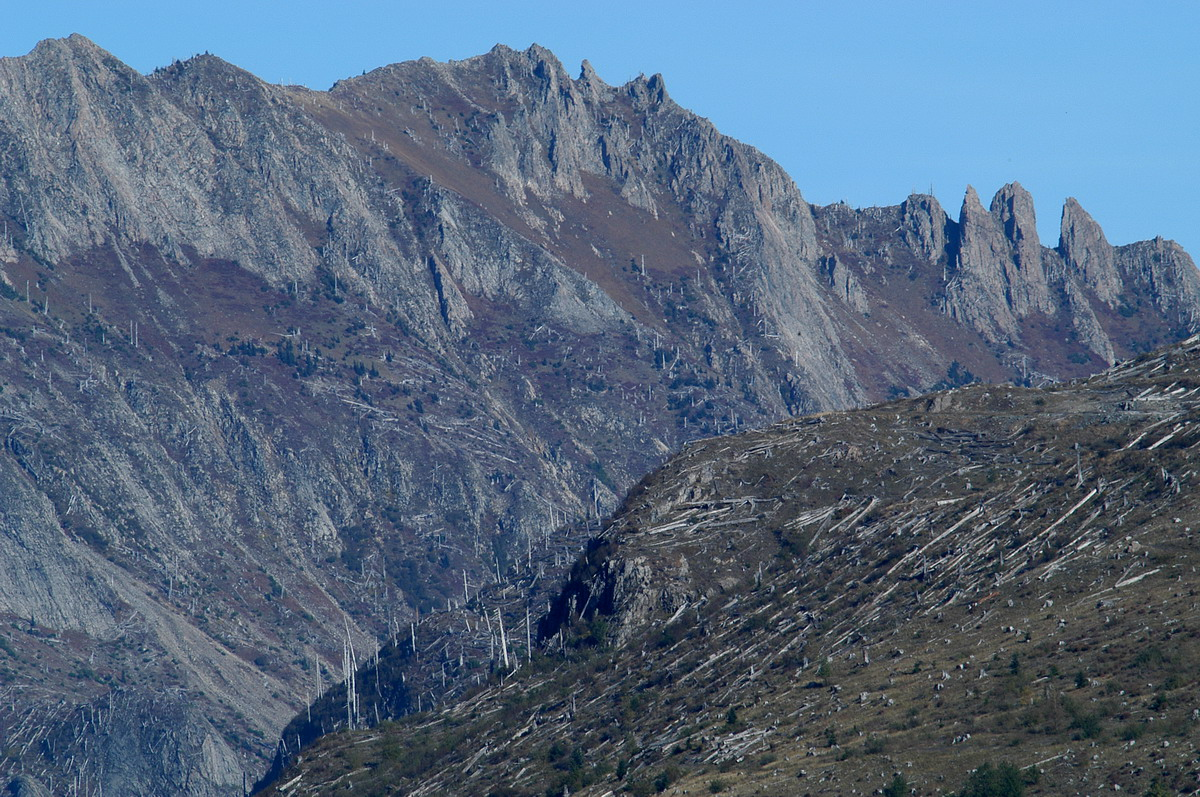
- West aspect

Highest point
- Elevation: 5,883 ft (1,793 m)
- Prominence: 1,843 ft (562 m)
- Parent peak: Mount St. Helens (8,333 ft)
- Isolation: 9.19 mi (14.79 km)
- Coordinates: 46°19′32″N 122°07′59″W

Geography
- Location within Washington (state) Location within the United States
- Location: Mount St. Helens National Volcanic Monument; Skamania County, Washington, U.S.
- Parent range: Cascade Range
- Topo map: USGS Spirit Lake West

Geology
- Rock type: granodiorite
- Volcanic arc: Cascade Volcanic Arc

Climbing
- Easiest route: exposed class 3 scrambling

Mount Whittier is a prominent 5,883-ft (1,793 m) mountain summit located in Mount St. Helens National Volcanic Monument, in the Gifford Pinchot National Forest, in Skamania County of southwest Washington state. It is situated in the Cascade Range, 2 mi (3.2 km) north of Spirit Lake, and 1.7 mi (2.7 km) northeast of The Dome. Its closest neighbor is Mount Margaret, 0.93 mi (1.50 km) to the south, and the nearest higher neighbor is Mount St. Helens, 9 mi (14 km) to the south. Whittier is the second-highest peak in the Mount St. Helens area, after Mt. St. Helens. Although modest in elevation, relief is significant as the summit rises 2,000 feet above the head of Coldwater Creek valley in 0.6 mi (0.97 km). Precipitation runoff from Mount Whittier drains into tributaries of the North Fork Toutle River.

== Geology ==
The history of the formation of the Cascade Mountains dates back millions of years ago to the late Eocene Epoch. Geological events occurring many years ago created the diverse topography and drastic elevation changes over the Cascade Range leading to various climate differences. During the Pleistocene period dating back over two million years ago, glaciation advancing and retreating repeatedly scoured and shaped the landscape. With the North American Plate overriding the Pacific Plate, episodes of volcanic igneous activity occurred. The lateral blast from the 1980 eruption of Mount St. Helens was pointed toward Mount Whittier and stripped the vegetation from its slopes. Due to Mount St. Helens' proximity to Mount Whittier, volcanic ash is common in the area. Mount Whittier and nearby Minnie Peak are composed of resistant granodiorite of the Spirit Lake pluton, which is a complex of once-molten rock that intruded the surrounding rocks approximately 20 million years ago.

== Climate ==
Mount Whittier is located in the marine west coast climate zone of western North America. Most weather fronts originate in the Pacific Ocean, and travel northeast toward the Cascade Mountains. As fronts approach, they are forced upward by the peaks of the Cascade Range (Orographic lift), causing them to drop their moisture in the form of rain or snowfall onto the Cascades. As a result, the west side of the Cascades experiences high precipitation, especially during the winter months in the form of snowfall. During winter months, weather is usually cloudy, but due to high pressure systems over the Pacific Ocean that intensify during summer months, there is often little or no cloud cover during the summer. The months July through September offer the most favorable weather for viewing or climbing this peak.

== See also ==
- Geology of the Pacific Northwest
- List of mountain peaks of Washington (state)
