= Mount Margaret (Skamania County, Washington) =

Mountain in Washington (state), United States

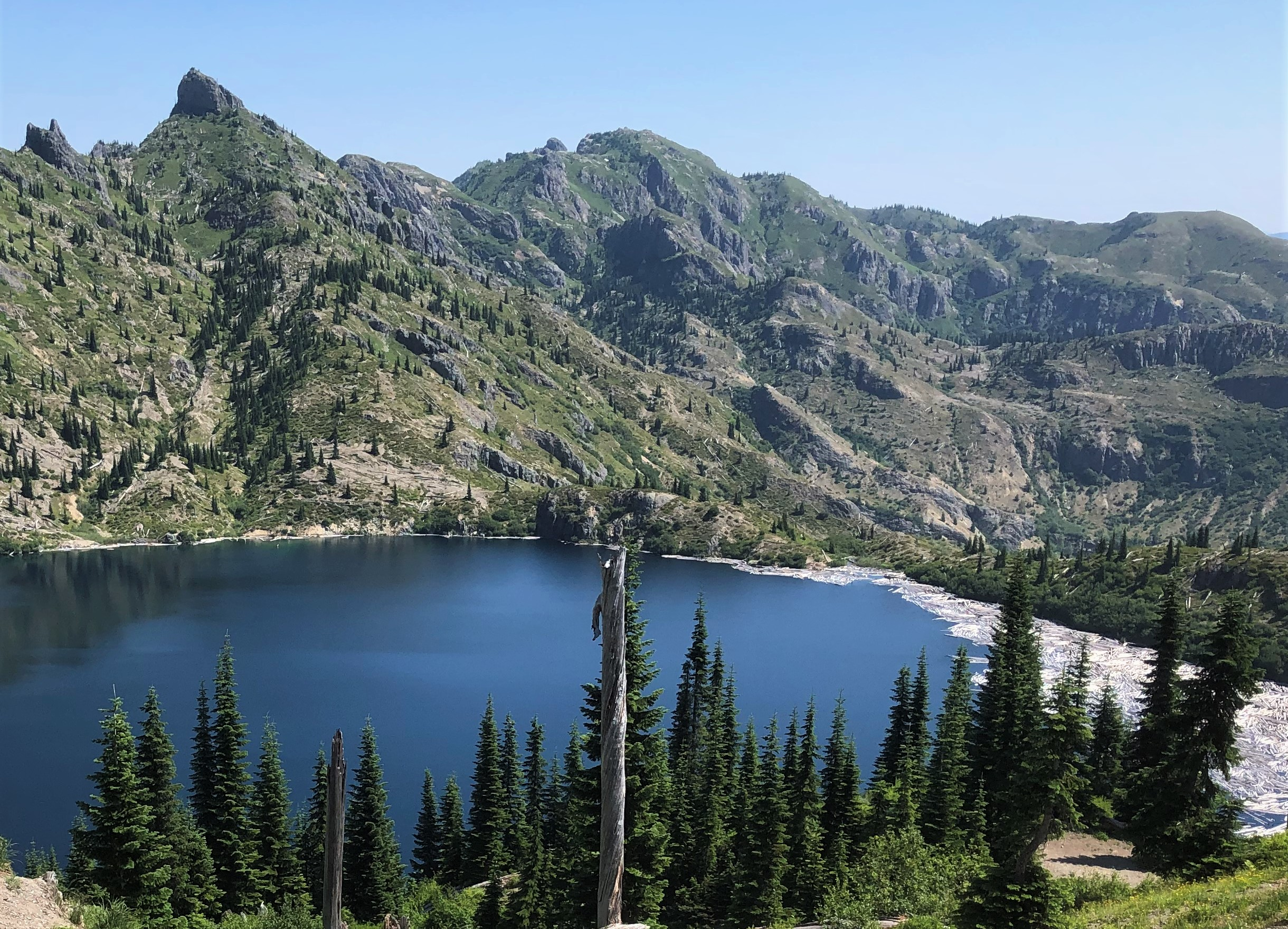
- Southwest aspect, centered beyond St. Helens Lake (The Dome upper left)

Highest point
- Elevation: 5,850 ft (1,780 m)
- Prominence: 400 ft (120 m)
- Parent peak: Mount Whittier (5,883 ft)
- Isolation: 0.94 mi (1.51 km)
- Coordinates: 46°18′43″N 122°08′04″W

Geography
- Location within Washington (state) Location within the United States
- Location: Mount St. Helens National Volcanic Monument; Skamania County, Washington, U.S.
- Parent range: Cascade Range
- Topo map: USGS Spirit Lake West

Geology
- Volcanic arc: Cascade Volcanic Arc

Climbing
- Easiest route: class 1 hiking via trail

Mount Margaret is a 5,850-ft (1,780 m) mountain summit located in Mount St. Helens National Volcanic Monument, in the Gifford Pinchot National Forest, in Skamania County of southwest Washington state. It is situated in the Cascade Range, 2 mi (3.2 km) north of Spirit Lake, and 2.4 mi (3.9 km) northeast of Coldwater Peak. Its nearest higher neighbor is Mount Whittier, 0.93 mi (1.50 km) to the north, and Mount St. Helens rises 8 mi (13 km) to the south. Precipitation runoff from Mount Margaret drains into Coldwater Creek, a tributary of the North Fork Toutle River. A hiking trail provides access to this mountain. This peak was named some time before 1900 by an admiring prospector for Margaret "Maggie" Shultz Layton (1877-1965), a pioneering resident of Toledo, Washington.

== Geology ==
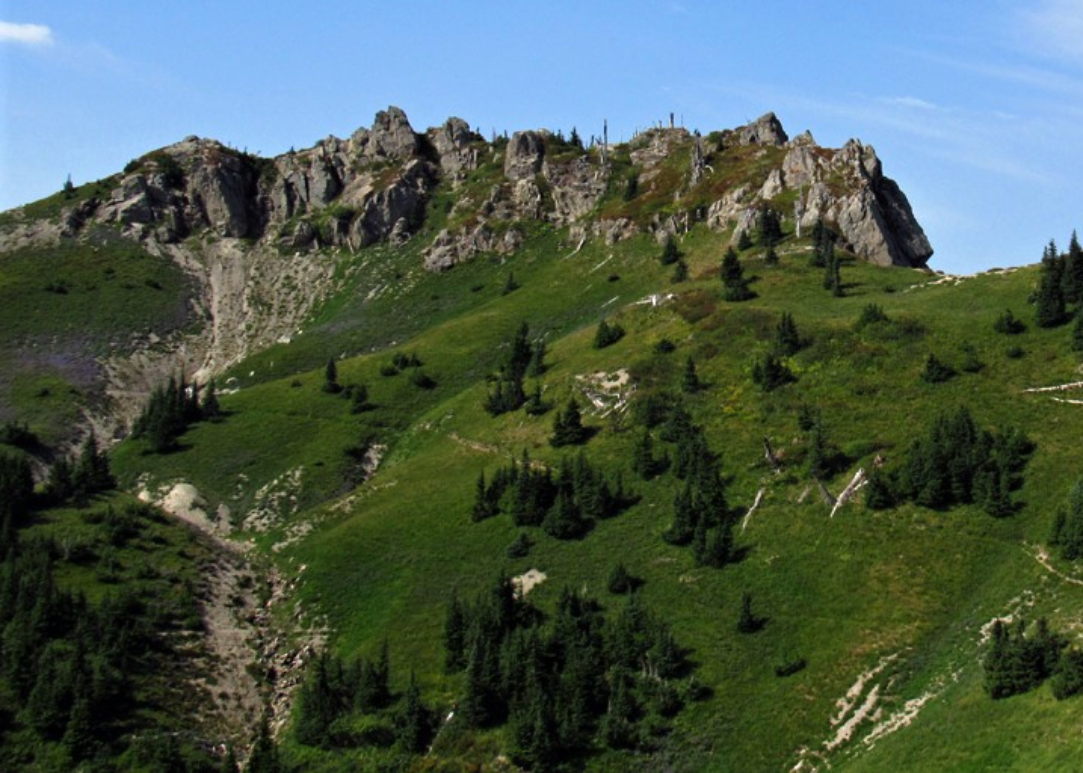
Mt. Margaret from east

The history of the formation of the Cascade Mountains dates back millions of years ago to the late Eocene Epoch. Geological events occurring many years ago created the diverse topography and drastic elevation changes over the Cascade Range leading to various climate differences. During the Pleistocene period dating back over two million years ago, glaciation advancing and retreating repeatedly scoured and shaped the landscape. With the North American Plate overriding the Pacific Plate, episodes of volcanic igneous activity occurred. The lateral blast from the 1980 eruption of Mount St. Helens was pointed toward Mount Margaret and stripped the vegetation from its slopes. Due to Mount Saint Helens' proximity to Mount Margaret, volcanic ash is common in the area.

== Climate ==
Coldwater Peak is located in the marine west coast climate zone of western North America. Most weather fronts originate in the Pacific Ocean, and travel northeast toward the Cascade Mountains. As fronts approach, they are forced upward by the peaks of the Cascade Range (Orographic lift), causing them to drop their moisture in the form of rain or snowfall onto the Cascades. As a result, the west side of the Cascades experiences high precipitation, especially during the winter months in the form of snowfall.

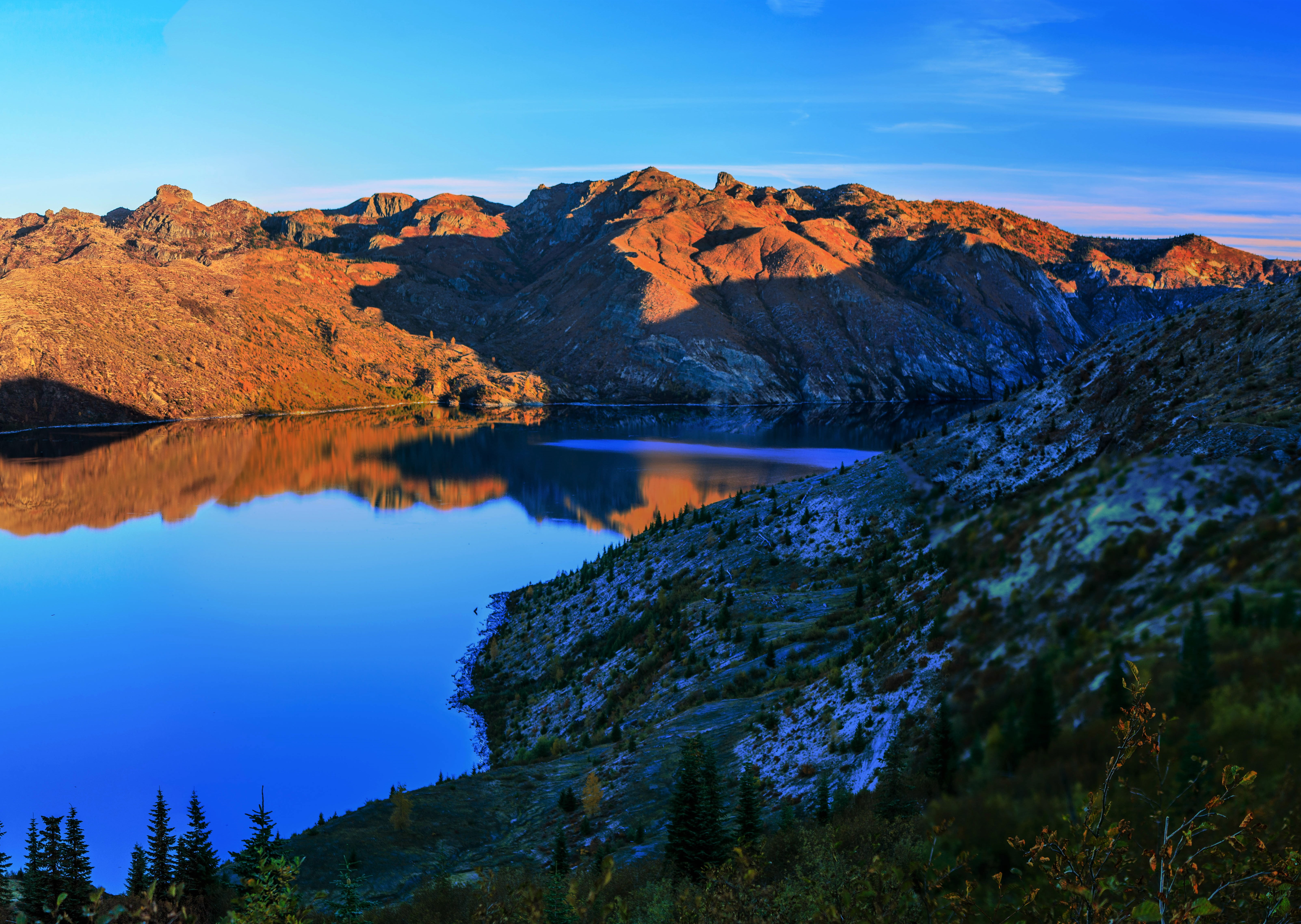
Mt. Margaret centered, from Spirit Lake at dawn

During winter months, weather is usually cloudy, but due to high pressure systems over the Pacific Ocean that intensify during summer months, there is often little or no cloud cover during the summer. The months July through September offer the most favorable weather for viewing or climbing this peak.

== See also ==
- Geology of the Pacific Northwest
- List of mountain peaks of Washington (state)
