= 1840 Ararat earthquake =

Violent earthquake in eastern Turkey

- Location within Turkey
- Local date: 2 July 1840
- Local time: 16:00
- Magnitude: 7.4 M_{s}
- Epicenter: 39.6°N 44.1°E
- Areas affected: Russian Empire; Ottoman Empire
- Max. intensity: MMI IX (Violent)
- Casualties: 10,000 dead

An earthquake occurred on 2 July 1840 at 16:00 local time with an epicenter near Mount Ararat, where it triggered an eruption and caused a landslide that destroyed villages. An estimated 10,000 people were killed by the earthquake and its damaging aftershocks. Earthquake catalogs place the surface-wave magnitude at M_{s} 7.4 and maximum Modified Mercalli intensity scale assigned IX (Violent).

== Geology ==
The area lies near the triple junction where the North Anatolian Fault meets the East Anatolian Fault and Zagros fold and thrust belt. These three features mark the plate boundaries of the Anatolian sub-plate, Arabian plate and Eurasian plate. Being at the junction of three tectonic plates, the region is prone to large shallow earthquakes, mainly of the strike-slip and thrust mechanism.

The magnitude 7.4 M_{s} earthquake occurred along the flanks of Mount Ararat. A 72 km (45 mi) surface rupture was associated with the shock. Rupture occurred along the Gailatu–Siah Cheshmeh–Khoy Fault—large earthquakes along the fault also occurred in 139 (M 7.0) and 1319 (M 7.4).

== Impact ==
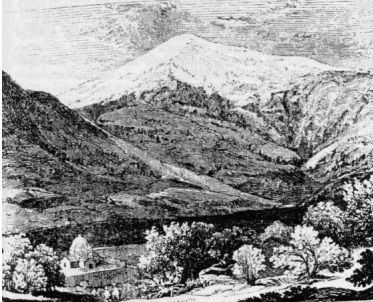
Saint Hakob of Akori Monastery was destroyed by the earthquake

As many as 10,000 people died in the earthquake and the associated effects, including 1,900 inhabitants from Akory. An estimated 4,000 people died from the secondary effects. The earthquake and lahar killed all 1,000 residents Akory (today Yenidoğan) and monks of the Saint Jacob (Hakob) monastery. A massive air blast caused severe damage. The regions of Avajiq, Pambukh, and Gailatu were devastated; nearly every single village was wiped out. Many homes collapsed and a castle was left in ruins at Doğubayazıt. Few homes remained intact. Liquefaction and landslides occurred in the areas further away from Mount Ararat. Liquefaction destroyed many villages including Karakhasanlou, Alesher and Karachalou. Sand erupted from fissures in the ground. Some fissures extended up to 1 km (0.62 mi) along the Aras, Karasu, Akhourian and Arpa rivers.

In Nakhichevan and Sharur districts, at least 7,821 homes and 24 places of worship were destroyed. Approximately 49 people died and 30 were injured in Russia. The slide also temporarily dammed the Metsamor River. Cities and towns including Etchmiadzin, Yerevan, Garni, Van, Tbilisi, Tabriz, and Gyumri were damaged.

== Volcanic eruption ==
A Bandai-style phreatic eruption was triggered, melting the glacier on the summit of Ararat, resulting in a lahar that buried villages. The lahar and landslide deposited near the base of the volcano creating a large alluvial fan. A phreatic eruption occurred on Mount Ararat on the day the earthquake struck. It generated a pyroclastic flow from fissure vents along the upper northern flank of the volcano.

Historical archive from the Ararat Diocese of the Armenian Apostolic Church said immediately after the earthquake, a large cloud reminiscent of a smoke column appeared over the canyon at Mount Ararat's northern slope. The village of Akori and Saint Hakob monastery were located at the canyon. A bright-red and blue light illuminated inside the cloud. There was an intense sulfur smell. Boulders measuring 300–500 kg (660–1,100 lb) were thrown from a fissure uphill from the monastery and village. The cloud rose above Mount Ararat's summit while another dark red-luminous dust cloud raced down the slope at high speed, destroying the village and killing many people. Trees in the village garden were burnt and uprooted. These descriptions were interpreted as the eruption of Mount Ararat and a pyroclastic flow.

== Landslide ==
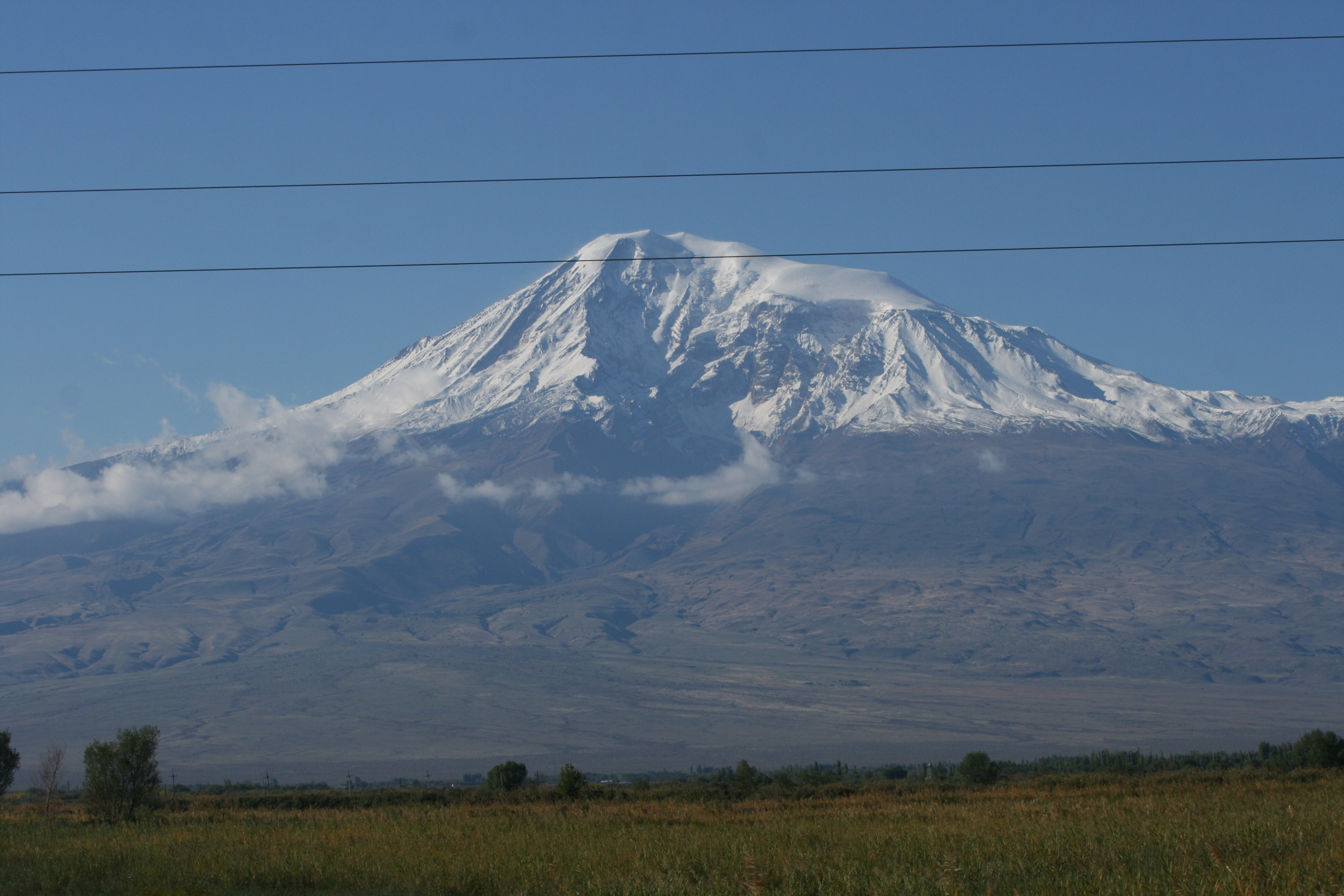
The gorge on Mount Ararat where the landslide occurred

A large landslide occurred on the northeastern flank of the volcano, forming the Ahora Gorge. It destroyed the Saint Hakob of Akori Monastery and Akory. Movement ceased at an elevation of 900 m (3,000 ft) where a natural dam formed. The dam was breached several days later, flooding and destroying the nearby villages. Additional landslides also caused flooding.

The earthquake and explosive eruption destabilized and damaged the upper slopes of the mountain. It detached and collapsed down the slope, through the canyon, disintegrating and moving at great velocity. In 2006, an academic study estimated 300,000,000 m^{3} (1.1×10^{10} cu ft) of volcanic material and glacial melt flowed down the gorge at 175 m (574 ft) per second.

The landslide consisted of blue liquid mud and large stones which traveled at high speed. An intense smell accompanied the landslide. The flow traveled more than 7 km (4.3 mi), creating a dam at the canyon. Large volumes of partially-melted ice, mud, rocks and water collected behind the dam. Bright blue-colored rain fell from the eruption cloud. At Etchmiadzin Cathedral, 55 km (34 mi) from Mount Ararat, the smell of sulfur was intense. Fractures that formed in the canyon ejected murky water with a strong sulfur smell.

An aftershock on 6 July caused a dam breach, releasing accumulated debris up to 21 km (13 mi) away. It reached the Aras River valley, spreading 12 km (7.5 mi) across before drying up. The landslide deposits contained boulders and a thick band of blue clay. Several villages including Aralık (Aralikh) were destroyed, along with some Russian military installations. The landslide also dammed the Karasu River. The debris flowed into fields, destroying the grain and fruit supply.

== See also ==
- List of earthquakes in Armenia
- List of earthquakes in Iran
- List of earthquakes in Russia
- List of earthquakes in Turkey
- List of historical earthquakes
