= The Dome (Washington) =

Mountain in Washington (state), United States

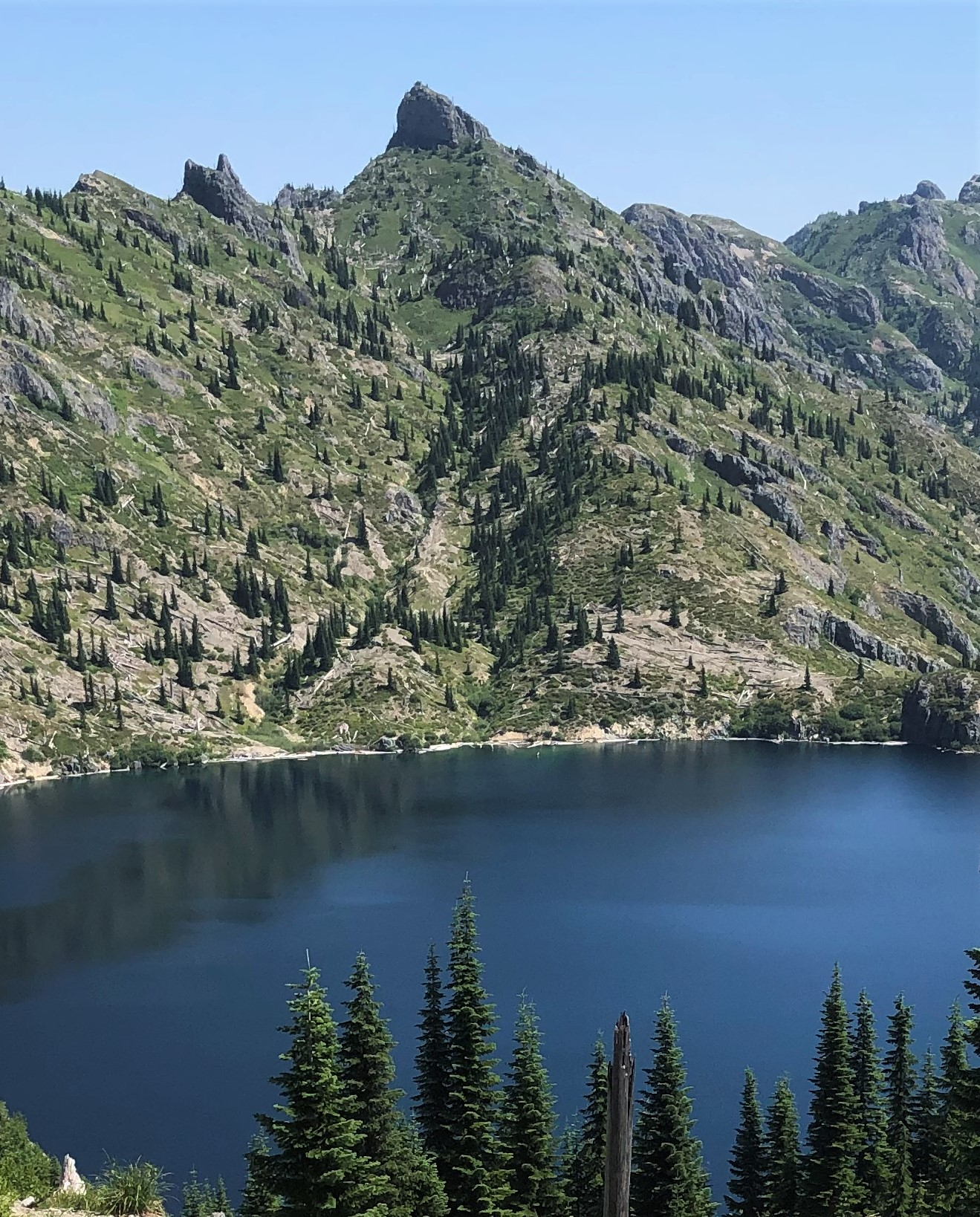
- Southwest aspect, with St. Helens Lake

Highest point
- Elevation: 5,720 ft (1,740 m)
- Prominence: 400 ft (120 m)
- Parent peak: Mount Margaret (5,860 ft)
- Isolation: 1.16 mi (1.87 km)
- Coordinates: 46°18′30″N 122°09′29″W

Geography
- Location within Washington (state) Location within the United States
- Location: Mount St. Helens National Volcanic Monument; Skamania County, Washington, U.S.
- Parent range: Cascade Range
- Topo map: USGS Spirit Lake West

Geology
- Rock type: Tertiary volcanic rock
- Volcanic arc: Cascade Volcanic Arc

The Dome is a 5,720+ ft (1,740+ m) mountain summit located in Mount St. Helens National Volcanic Monument, in the Gifford Pinchot National Forest, in Skamania County of southwest Washington state. It is situated in the Cascade Range, less than 2 mi (3.2 km) north of Spirit Lake, and 1.28 mi (2.06 km) northeast of Coldwater Peak. Its nearest higher neighbor is Mount Margaret, 1.16 mi (1.87 km) to the northeast, and Mount St. Helens rises 7.5 mi (12.1 km) to the south. Precipitation runoff from The Dome is drained by Coldwater Creek, a tributary of the North Fork Toutle River.

== Geology ==
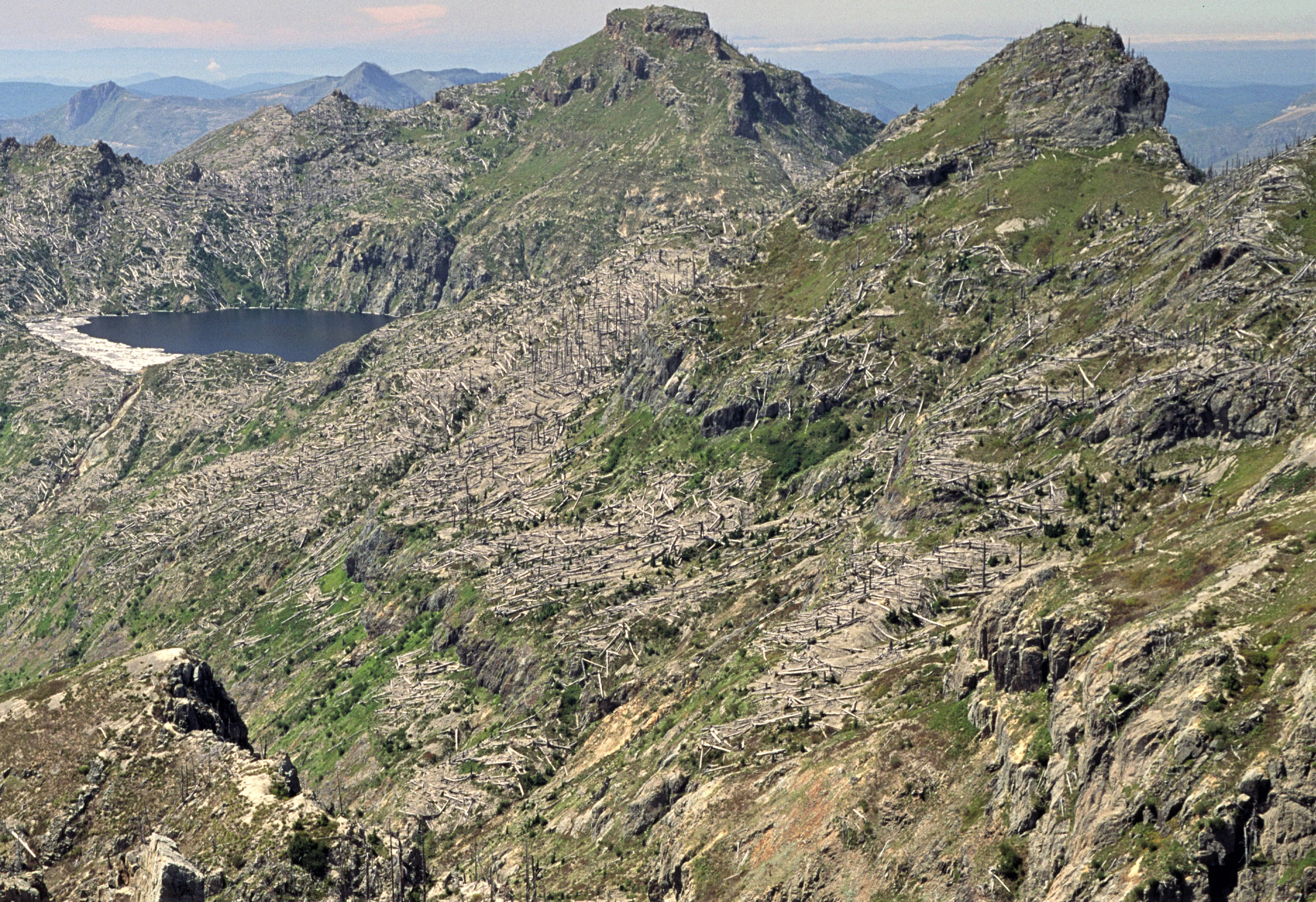
Coldwater Peak and The Dome (right) from the northeast

The history of the formation of the Cascade Mountains dates back millions of years ago to the late Eocene Epoch. Geological events occurring many years ago created the diverse topography and drastic elevation changes over the Cascade Range leading to various climate differences. During the Pleistocene period dating back over two million years ago, glaciation advancing and retreating repeatedly scoured and shaped the landscape. With the North American Plate overriding the Pacific Plate, episodes of volcanic igneous activity occurred. The lateral blast from the 1980 eruption of Mount St. Helens was pointed straight toward The Dome and stripped the vegetation from the slopes. Due to Mount Saint Helens' proximity to The Dome, volcanic ash is common in the area.

== Climate ==
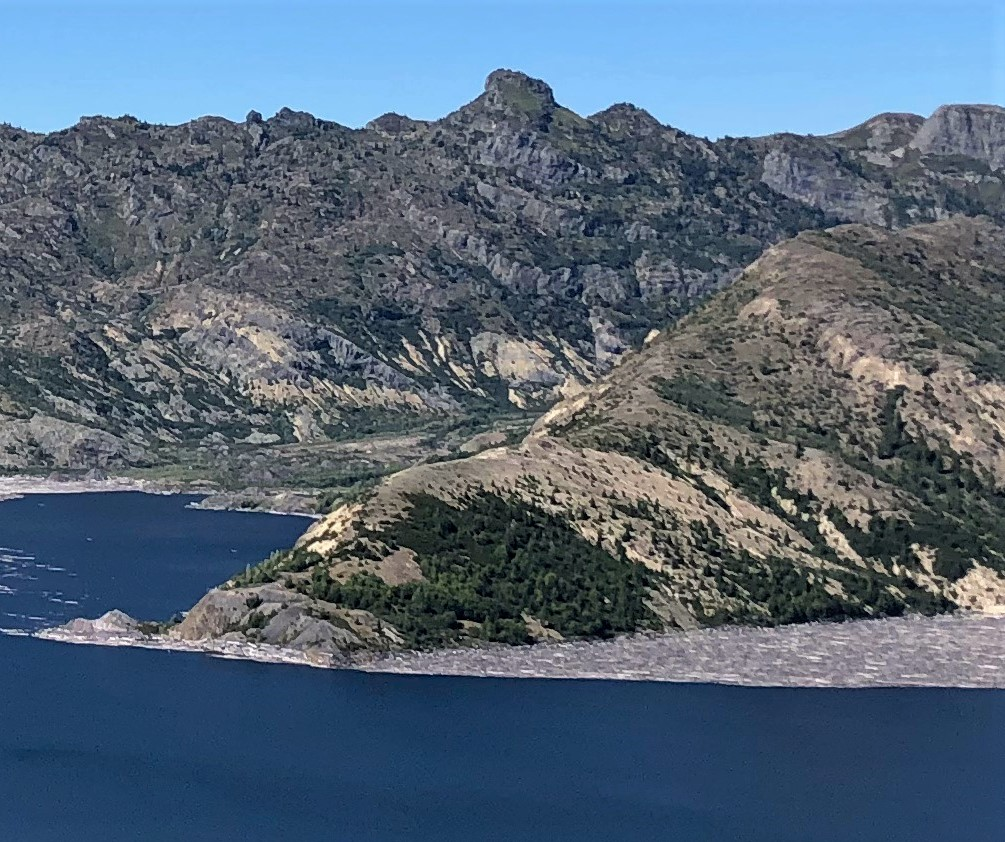
The Dome from SSE, beyond Spirit Lake

The Dome is located in the marine west coast climate zone of western North America. Most weather fronts originate in the Pacific Ocean, and travel northeast toward the Cascade Mountains. As fronts approach, they are forced upward by the peaks of the Cascade Range (Orographic lift), causing them to drop their moisture in the form of rain or snowfall onto the Cascades. As a result, the west side of the Cascades experiences high precipitation, especially during the winter months in the form of snowfall. During winter months, weather is usually cloudy, but due to high pressure systems over the Pacific Ocean that intensify during summer months, there is often little or no cloud cover during the summer. The months July through September offer the most favorable weather for viewing or climbing this peak.

== See also ==
- Geology of the Pacific Northwest
- List of mountain peaks of Washington (state)
