= List of earthquakes in 1926 =

Earthquakes in 1926
Approximate epicenters of notable earthquakes in 1926
- 4.0–5.9 magnitude
- 6.0–6.9 magnitude
- 7.0–7.9 magnitude
- 8.0+ magnitude
- Strongest: 2 events reached magnitude 7.6
- Deadliest: Turkey Kars Province (Magnitude 5.7) October 22, 360 deaths
- Total fatalities: 976

Number by magnitude
- 9.0+: 0

This is a list of earthquakes in 1926. Only magnitude 6.0 or greater earthquakes appear on the list. Lower magnitude events are included if they have caused death, injury or damage. Events which occurred in remote areas will be excluded from the list as they wouldn't have generated significant media interest. All dates are listed according to UTC time. A fairly active year, with Greece, Dutch East Indies, and the Solomon Islands experiencing many large events. In spite of this the death toll was relatively low.

== Overall ==
=== By death toll ===
Rank	Death toll	Magnitude	Location	MMI	Depth (km)	Date
1	360	5.7	Turkey, Kars Province	IX (Violent)	7.0	October 22
2	354	6.7 (7.6)	Dutch East Indies, West Sumatra	VII (Very Strong)	15.0	June 28
= 3	101	0.0	Dutch East Indies, central Sumatra	( )	0.0	July 5
= 3	101	5.5	China, Yunnan Province	VII (Very strong)	0.0	November 22
4	51	6.9	Greece, Dodecanese Islands	XI (Extreme)	15.0	June 26

- Note: At least 10 casualties

=== By magnitude ===
Rank	Magnitude	Death toll	Location	MMI	Depth (km)	Date
= 1	7.6	0	Russian SFSR	( )	15.0	January 25
= 1	7.6	0	Dutch East Indies, Papua (province)	( )	35.0	October 26
2	7.4	0	Australia, north of Macquarie Island	( )	10.0	October 3
3	7.3	0	British Solomon Islands, northwest Makira	( )	15.0	April 12
4	7.2	0	El Salvador, off coast of	( )	20.0	February 8
= 5	7.1	0	Dutch East Indies, south of Java	( )	35.0	September 10
= 5	7.1	0	British Solomon Islands	( )	15.0	September 16
= 6	7.0	0	United Kingdom, south of the South Sandwich Islands	( )	10.0	March 21
= 6	7.0	0	British Solomon Islands	( )	15.0	March 27
= 6	7.0	0	Chile, Antofagasta Region	( )	90.0	April 28
= 6	7.0	0	France, southeast of the Loyalty Islands	( )	20.0	August 25
= 6	7.0	0	Southwest Indian Ridge	( )	10.0	September 2
= 6	7.0	0	United States, Andreanof Islands, Alaska	( )	40.0	October 13
= 6	7.0	0	Nicaragua León Department	( )	15.0	November 5

- Note: At least 7.0 magnitude

== Notable events ==
=== January ===
January
- Strongest: 7.6 M_{w} British Solomon Islands
- Total fatalities: 0

Number by magnitude
- 8.0–8.9: 0
- 7.0–7.9: 1
- 6.0–6.9: 2

Date	Country and location	M_{w}	Depth (km)	MMI	Notes	Casualties	
Date	Country and location	M_{w}	Depth (km)	MMI	Notes	Dead	Injured
15	Japan, northeast of Hokkaido	6.2	360.0				
25	British Solomon Islands	7.6	15.0				
26	France, southeast of the Loyalty Islands	6.6	20.0				

=== February ===
February
- Strongest: 7.2 M_{w} El Salvador
- Total fatalities: 0

Number by magnitude
- 8.0–8.9: 0
- 7.0–7.9: 1
- 6.0–6.9: 5

Date	Country and location	M_{w}	Depth (km)	MMI	Notes	Casualties	
Date	Country and location	M_{w}	Depth (km)	MMI	Notes	Dead	Injured
1	Venezuela, Sucre, Venezuela	6.5	100.0				
4	Japan, off the west coast of Honshu	6.2	150.0				
7	New Guinea, north of New Britain	6.5	390.0				
8	El Salvador, off the coast	7.2	20.0				
9	Argentina, Santiago del Estero Province	6.5	660.0				
15	El Salvador, off the coast	6.7	15.0		Aftershock.		

=== March ===
March
- Strongest: 7.0 M_{w} 2 events
- Total fatalities: 0

Number by magnitude
- 8.0–8.9: 0
- 7.0–7.9: 2
- 6.0–6.9: 4

Date	Country and location	M_{w}	Depth (km)	MMI	Notes	Casualties	
Date	Country and location	M_{w}	Depth (km)	MMI	Notes	Dead	Injured
4	Dutch East Indies, Talaud Islands	6.5	15.0				
7	Peru, Loreto Region	6.5	150.0				
17	Nicaragua, off the east coast	6.9	25.0				
18	Turkey, Antalya Province	6.8	15.0				
21	United Kingdom, south of the South Sandwich Islands	7.0	10.0				
27	British Solomon Islands	7.0	15.0				

=== April ===
April
- Strongest: 7.3 M_{w} British Solomon Islands
- Total fatalities: 0

Number by magnitude
- 8.0–8.9: 0
- 7.0–7.9: 2
- 6.0–6.9: 2

Date	Country and location	M_{w}	Depth (km)	MMI	Notes	Casualties	
Date	Country and location	M_{w}	Depth (km)	MMI	Notes	Dead	Injured
1	Japan, off the south coast of Honshu	6.9	340.0				
5	Portugal, Azores	6.0	50.0				
12	British Solomon Islands, northwest Makira	7.3	15.0				
28	Chile, Antofagasta Region	7.0	90.0				

=== May ===
May
- Strongest: 6.6 M_{w} Philippines
- Total fatalities: 0

Number by magnitude
- 8.0–8.9: 0
- 7.0–7.9: 0
- 6.0–6.9: 4

Date	Country and location	M_{w}	Depth (km)	MMI	Notes	Casualties	
Date	Country and location	M_{w}	Depth (km)	MMI	Notes	Dead	Injured
10	British Burma, Kachin State	6.2	80.0				
11	Mexico, off the coast of Jalisco	6.2	15.0				
20	Philippines, south of Mindanao	6.6	35.0				
26	Japan, southeast of Hokkaido	6.3	35.0				

=== June ===
June
- Strongest: 6.9 M_{w} Greece
- Deadliest: 6.7 M_{w} Dutch East Indies; 354 deaths
- Total fatalities: 405

Number by magnitude
- 8.0–8.9: 0
- 7.0–7.9: 0
- 6.0–6.9: 8

Date	Country and location	M_{w}	Depth (km)	MMI	Notes	Casualties	
Date	Country and location	M_{w}	Depth (km)	MMI	Notes	Dead	Injured
3	New Hebrides	6.4	25.0				
4	Tibet, Tibet	6.0	35.0				
5	Japan, south of Kyushu	6.5	180.0				
24	Dutch East Indies, Banda Sea	6.5	150.0				
26	Greece, Dodecanese Islands	6.9	15.0	XI	At least 51 deaths were caused. Major damage was reported.	51+	
28	Dutch East Indies, northern Sumatra	6.7	15.0	IX	The 1926 Padang Panjang earthquake struck West Sumatra killing 354 people and collapsed 2,383 houses. It also had a magnitude of 7.6 on the Richter scale.	354	
28	Dutch East Indies, southern Sumatra	6.4	35.0		Possible aftershock of previous event. Registered as a 7.8 on the Richter magnitude scale.		
29	Japan, Ryukyu Islands	6.8	15.0				

=== July ===
July
- Strongest: 6.8 M_{w} Dutch East Indies
- Deadliest: 0.0 M_{w} Dutch East Indies; 101+ deaths
- Total fatalities: 101+

Number by magnitude
- 8.0–8.9: 0
- 7.0–7.9: 0
- 6.0–6.9: 7

Date	Country and location	M_{w}	Depth (km)	MMI	Notes	Casualties	
Date	Country and location	M_{w}	Depth (km)	MMI	Notes	Dead	Injured
1	Dutch East Indies, off the west coast of southern Sumatra	6.8	25.0				
5	Dutch East Indies, central Sumatra	0.0	0.0		At least 101 deaths were caused as well as the destruction of some homes. The magnitude and depth were unknown.	101+	
10	Dutch East Indies, Molucca Sea	6.6	15.0				
14	Dutch East Indies, east of Morotai	6.2	180.0		A doublet earthquake as these events struck 12 minutes apart.		
14	Dutch East Indies, east of Morotai	6.2	180.0				
16	New Guinea, Morobe Province	6.3	35.0				
26	Japan, off the west coast of Honshu	6.6	360.0				
28	British Solomon Islands, Rendova Island	6.5	15.0				

=== August ===
August
- Strongest: 7.0 M_{w} France
- Deadliest: 5.3 M_{w} Portugal; 9 deaths
- Total fatalities: 9

Number by magnitude
- 8.0–8.9: 0
- 7.0–7.9: 1
- 6.0–6.9: 9
- 5.0–5.9: 2

Date	Country and location	M_{w}	Depth (km)	MMI	Notes	Casualties	
Date	Country and location	M_{w}	Depth (km)	MMI	Notes	Dead	Injured
2	Philippines, Catanduanes	6.6	15.0				
3	Taiwan, southeast of	6.5	15.0				
3	Dutch East Indies, Ceram Sea	6.7	15.0				
3	Dutch East Indies, Nias	6.0	35.0				
6	Tibet, Tibet (1912-1951)	6.3	10.0				
9	United States, Andreanof Islands, Alaska	6.4	35.0				
9	Taiwan, north of	6.3	35.0				
12	Argentina, Salta Province	6.6	250.0				
17	Italy, Aeolian Islands	5.3	100.0	VII	Major damage was reported.		
25	France, southeast of the Loyalty Islands	7.0	20.0				
30	Greece, Peloponnese (region)	6.3	50.0				
31	Portugal, Azores	5.3	4.0		The 1926 Horta earthquake was destructive despite its moderate intensity. 9 people were killed and 200 were injured. 4,138 homes were damaged or destroyed.	9	200

=== September ===
September
- Strongest: 7.1 M_{w} 2 events
- Total fatalities: 0

Number by magnitude
- 8.0–8.9: 0
- 7.0–7.9: 3
- 6.0–6.9: 3

Date	Country and location	M_{w}	Depth (km)	MMI	Notes	Casualties	
Date	Country and location	M_{w}	Depth (km)	MMI	Notes	Dead	Injured
2	Southwest Indian Ridge	7.0	10.0				
4	Japan, southeast of Hokkaido	6.4	35.0				
7	New Guinea, Madang Province	6.6	35.0				
10	Dutch East Indies, south of Java	7.1	35.0				
12	Taiwan, east of	6.5	15.0				
16	British Solomon Islands, west of Guadalcanal	7.1	15.0		Some homes were damaged. A tsunami was observed.		

=== October ===
October
- Strongest: 7.6 M_{w} Dutch East Indies
- Deadliest: 5.7 M_{w} Turkey; 360 deaths
- Total fatalities: 360

Number by magnitude
- 8.0–8.9: 0
- 7.0–7.9: 3
- 6.0–6.9: 7
- 5.0–5.9: 1

Date	Country and location	M_{w}	Depth (km)	MMI	Notes	Casualties	
Date	Country and location	M_{w}	Depth (km)	MMI	Notes	Dead	Injured
3	Japan, off the east coast of Honshu	6.3	25.0				
3	Australia, north of Macquarie Island	7.4	10.0				
13	United States, Andreanof Islands, Alaska	6.9	45.0		The beginning of a series of large events on this day.		
13	United States, Andreanof Islands, Alaska	6.7	50.0				
13	United States, Andreanof Islands, Alaska	7.0	40.0				
22	United States, Monterey Bay, California	6.1	35.0		A doublet earthquake as these events were an hour apart.		
22	United States, Monterey Bay, California	6.3	10.0				
22	Turkey, Kars Province	5.7	7.0	IX	The 1926 Kars earthquake was destructive despite the moderate magnitude. 360 people were killed. Major damage was reported.	360	
26	Dutch East Indies, Papua (province)	7.6	35.0				
26	Dutch East Indies, Papua (province)	6.6	25.0		Aftershock.		
26	Dutch East Indies, Papua (province)	6.3	35.0		Aftershock.		

=== November ===
November
- Strongest: 7.0 M_{w} Nicaragua
- Deadliest: 5.5 M_{w} China; 101+ deaths
- Total fatalities: 101+

Number by magnitude
- 8.0–8.9: 0
- 7.0–7.9: 1
- 6.0–6.9: 1
- 5.0–5.9: 1

Date	Country and location	M_{w}	Depth (km)	MMI	Notes	Casualties	
Date	Country and location	M_{w}	Depth (km)	MMI	Notes	Dead	Injured
5	Nicaragua, León Department	7.0	15.0		Major damage was caused.		
22	China, Yunnan Province	5.5	0.0	VII	At least 101 people died and some homes were destroyed. The depth was unknown.	101+	
27	Philippines, Leyte	6.2	15.0				

=== December ===
December
- Strongest: 6.8 M_{w} Dutch East Indies
- Total fatalities: 0

Number by magnitude
- 8.0–8.9: 0
- 7.0–7.9: 0
- 6.0–6.9: 4
- 5.0–5.9: 1

Date	Country and location	M_{w}	Depth (km)	MMI	Notes	Casualties	
Date	Country and location	M_{w}	Depth (km)	MMI	Notes	Dead	Injured
9	Chile, Atacama Region	6.0	33.0				
13	Dutch East Indies, central Java	0.0	0.0	IX	At least 51 people were hurt. Major damage was caused. The magnitude and depth were unknown.		51+
14	Dutch East Indies, south of Sumba	6.2	35.0				
17	Albanian Republic, Fier County	5.8	0.0	X	Many homes were destroyed. The depth was unknown.		
25	New Guinea, East Sepik Province	6.4	35.0				
25	Dutch East Indies, Makassar Strait	6.8	35.0				
