= Saint Hakob of Akori Monastery =

Armenian monastery complex in Turkey

Saint Hakob of Akori Monastery; Ակոռիի Սուրբ Հակոբ վանք
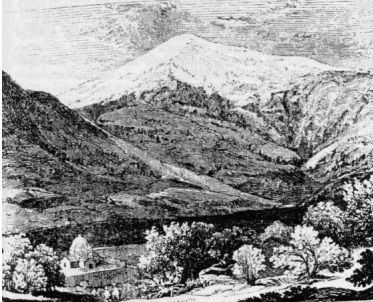

- Location within Turkey

Religion
- Affiliation: Armenian Apostolic Church
- Province: Iğdır Province
- Region: Eastern Anatolia region
- Ecclesiastical or organizational status: Destroyed on July 2, 1840
- Status: Ceased functioning as a monastery in 1840

Location
- Location: Northeastern slope of Mount Ararat
- State: Turkey
- Interactive map of: Saint Hakob of Akori Monastery; Ակոռիի Սուրբ Հակոբ վանք
- Coordinates: 39°43′08.1″N 44°22′24.3″E

Architecture
- Type: Church
- Style: Armenian
- Completed: 341 A.D.

Saint Hakob of Akori Monastery (Armenian: Ակոռիի Սուրբ Հակոբ վանք; pronounced Akori Surb Hakob Vank; also sometimes referred to as Saint James), was an Armenian monastery located in the southeastern part of the historic region of Surmalu (today the Iğdır Province of modern Turkey). The monastery was located 4.7 kilometers southwest of Akori, a village at the northeastern slope of Mount Ararat. Destroyed by an earthquake and lahar in 1840, Akori was later rebuilt. It is known today as Yenidoğan and remains a small Kurdish village.

In 1829, Baltic German explorer Friedrich Parrot, Armenian writer Khachatur Abovian, and four others reached the top of Mount Ararat in the first recorded ascent in history. They used St. Hakob as their base.

== Architecture ==
The monastery of St. Hakob was a cruciform central-plan structure constructed of black stone with a central dome typical for Armenian churches of the time. The monastery had eucharistical inscriptions engraved upon the walls that dated from the 13th to 14th centuries.

== History ==
The monastery was founded in 341 A.D. by Jacob of Nisibis, the second bishop of Nisibis who lived during the 3rd to 4th centuries A.D. It was built upon the northeastern slope of Mount Ararat (Armenian: Մասիս; the greater mountain is referred to as Masis in Armenian) in Masyatsotn canton of a larger province of Ayrarat in Armenian kingdom. Some sources say that St. Hakob was the name of the monastery while there was a chapel of St. James nearby, while other sources refer to the two as the same site. The monastery is said to have contained relics of wood from the Biblical Ark of Noah. A strong earthquake, and a few hours later, a volcanic eruption occurred on Mount Ararat on July 2, 1840, triggering a lahar that destroyed the monastery of St. Hakob, Arakelots Vank in the neighboring village of Akori as well as the village itself.

== Folklore ==
According to legend, St. Jacob tried many times to climb Mount Ararat to find Noah's Ark, which was buried under thick layers of ice at Parrot Glacier at the top of the mountain. He would climb the mountain, fall asleep, and wake up downhill from where he was before. After repeated failed attempts, one day God said him in a dream, "Do not try to find the Ark anymore. I will give you a piece of a wood of what the Ark was hewn". When he woke up, to his amazement, he found the wood lying nearby. He decided to build the monastery at the location where he found the wood.
