= Yenidoğan, Aralık =

Yenidoğan
- Village
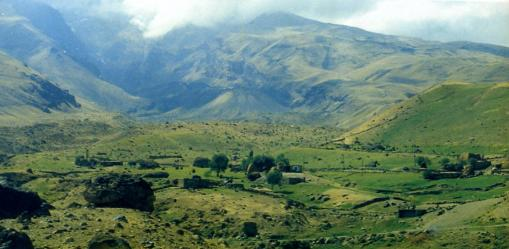

- Location within Turkey
- Coordinates: 39°46′N 44°22′E
- Country: Turkey
- Province: Iğdır
- District: Aralık

Government
  - Muhtar: Sabri Keşan
- Elevation: 1,743 m (5,719 ft)
- Population (2022): 367
- Time zone: UTC+3 (TRT)
- Postal code: 76500
- Area code: 0476

Yenidoğan (Armenian: Ակոռի, romanized: Akoři; Kurdish: Axurî; Russian: Ахури, Akhuri) (Note: under Russian administration) is a village in eastern Turkey, on the northeastern slope of Mount Ararat, adjacent to the point where the borders of Turkey, Iran, and Armenia meet. Historically called Akori in Armenian, it was known in Turkey as Ahora until 1965. The village is a part of the Aralık District of Turkey's Iğdır Province, which largely corresponds to the historic region of Surmalu. Its population is 367 (2022). It is nearly 50 kilometers south of Yerevan, the Armenian capital.

== Etymology ==
The name Yenidoğan literally means "newborn" in the Turkish language. Friedrich Parrot speculated that the historic name of Akhuri had Biblical origins and derived from the local Armenian tradition that the grapevines of the village were planted by Noah after he descended from the Ark. "The Armenian name of the village contains a distinct allusion to that occurrence," wrote Parrot, "arghanel, in that language, means to set or plant, whence argh, he planted, and urri, the vine." This theory was rejected by French Caucasus scholar Marie-Félicité Brosset.

== History ==
Numerous examples of ancient, early Proto-cuneiform glyphs have been found on rocks in the vicinity of Yenidoğan.

Arguri also known as Arghurri, Arghuri, was an ethnic Armenian village in Russian Armenia. According to tradition Arguri was the oldest village in the world, and the first vine was said to be planted here by Noah. In the Armenian language, the word 'Arghurri' means "he planted a", or "the vine". In 1840 a catastrophe earthquake buried the village. The population consisted of 1600 Armenians, with a number of Kurds also.

The Battle of Akori was a battle fought in 481, in the ancient village of Akori, the Persians had launched an attack in Armenia. The Armenian squadrons had led the Persians to the mountains of Ararat and ultimately defeated the Persian forces.

The Armenian rebels consisted of 300 men against 7,000 Persian regulars in Agori.

It was from this village in 1829 that Friedrich Parrot, Armenian writer Khachatur Abovian, and four others reached the top of Mount Ararat in the first recorded ascent in history. They used the Armenian monastery of St. Hakob as their base. The monastery was later destroyed in the earthquake of 1840.

== Geography and climate ==
Yenidoğan is situated on the northeastern slope of Mount Ararat at an altitude of 1,743 metres (5,718 ft). It is notable for the 1800 meters deep Ahora (or Akhuri) Gorge, a massive canyon on the north side of Ararat. The village has a highly fluctuating climate with extreme temperatures and a highly variable precipitation.

== Demographics ==
The population of Akhuri was predominantly ethnic Armenian until the village was destroyed in the 1840 earthquake. The reestablished Akhuri was repopulated mostly by ethnic Kurds from neighboring villages. Modern Yenidoğan is today a predominantly Kurdish village.

James Bryce wrote in 1877 about the 1840 quake:

There formerly stood a pleasant little Armenian village of some two hundred houses, named Arghuri, or Aghurri Not far above the village . . . stood the little monastery of St. Jacob, eight centuries old. Towards sunset in the evening of the June 20, 1840, the sudden shock of an earthquake, accompanied by a subterranean roar, and followed by a terrific blast of wind, threw down the houses of Arghuri, and at the same moment detached enormous masses of rock with their super-adjacent ice from the cliffs that surround the chasm. A shower of falling rocks overwhelmed in an instant the village, the monastery and a Kurdish encampment on the pastures above. Not a soul survived to tell the tale. The little monastery, where Parrot lived so happily among the few old monks is gone forever.

The earthquake and fall of rock which destroyed the village of Arghuri, in 1840 may have been caused by a volcanic explosion, but the evidence is not satisfactory.
