= List of earthquakes in Armenia =

This is an incomplete list of earthquakes in Armenia.

Date	Region	Time	Mag.	MMI	Epicenter	Depth (km)	Fatalities	Injuries	Ref
2022-02-13	Metsavan	18:25 UTC	5.3	VI	41.160°N 44.001°E	10.0		2	
2021-02-13	Hovtashen	11:29 UTC	4.9	VI	40.031°N 44.452°E	10.0		3	
1992-12-09	Madina, Gegharkunik	20:29 UTC	4.8	VII	40.058°N 45.312°E	15.8			
1988-12-07	Spitak, Leninakan, Kirovakan	07:41 UTC	6.8 M_{s}	X	40.987°N 44.185°E	5.4	25,000–50,000		
1968	Zangezur		4.7	VII-VIII					
1937	Yerevan		4.8	VII					
1931-04-27	Hatsavan, Zangezur	16:50 UTC	6.4	VIII–IX	39.291°N 45.950°E	15.0	300–2,890		
1926-10-22	Turkey-Soviet Armenia border	21:59 local time	6.0	IX	40.7°N 43.7°E	7 km (4.3 mi)	360		
1840-03-07	Mount Ararat	16:00 local time	7.4	IX	39°36′0″N,44°6′0″E	N/A	10,000		
1679-04-06	Garni, Yerevan, Kanaker	Unknown	7.0	VIII	40°12′0″N, 44°42′0″E	N/A	7,600+		
1269-05-14	Ilkhanate, Antioch	First hour of the night	7.0	VIII	37°30′0″N,35°30′0″E	N/A	8,000		
1139-09-30	Ganja, Azerbaijan, Seljuk Empire	Unknown	7.7	XI	40°18′0″N, 46°12′0″E	N/A	230,000–300,000		
893-12-28	Dvin, Artashat	midnight	5.3–7	IX–X	40°0′0″N,44°24′0″E		30,000		
Note: The inclusion criteria for adding events are based on WikiProject Earthquakes' notability guideline that was developed for stand alone articles. The principles described also apply to lists. In summary, only damaging, injurious, or deadly events should be recorded.

== See also ==
- Geology of Armenia
