= 1926 Kars earthquake =

Earthquake in Turkey

- Location within Caucasus Mountains
- UTC time: 1926-10-22 19:59:38
- ISC event: 910181
- USGS-ANSS: ComCat
- Local date: 22 October 1926
- Local time: 21:59
- Magnitude: 6.0 M_{s}
- Depth: 7 km (4.3 mi)
- Epicenter: 40.7°N 43.7°E
- Areas affected: Turkey, Armenia
- Max. intensity: MMI IX (Violent)
- Casualties: 360

The 1926 Kars earthquake (also known as the Leninakan earthquake) occurred at 21:59 local time on 22 October along the border area of Soviet Armenia and eastern Turkey. It had a surface-wave magnitude of 6.0 and a maximum felt intensity of IX (Violent) on the Mercalli intensity scale, causing 360 casualties. Many buildings in Leninakan and surrounding villages were destroyed or damaged.

The Soviet investigation by the geologist Pyotr Lebedev, published in 1927, noted that the quake could be felt as far away as Yerevan, Tiflis, Batumi and even Sochi, and that aftershocks lasted for several days. He noted that up to 300 people were killed in the quake in Soviet Armenia, with about the same number seriously injured.

== See also ==
- List of earthquakes in 1926
- List of earthquakes in Turkey
- List of earthquakes in Armenia
