= Coldwater Peak =

Mountain in Washington (state), United States

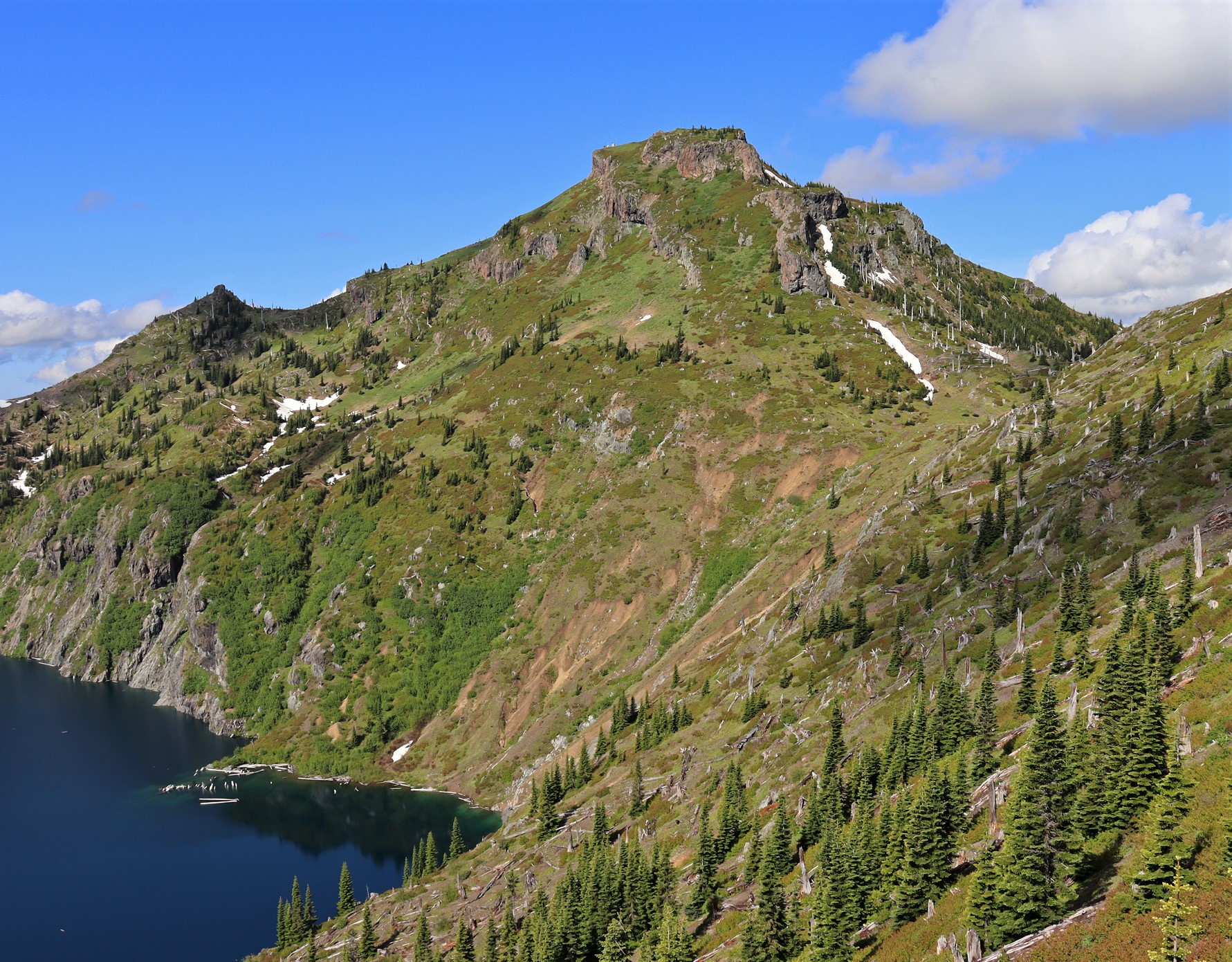
- Northeast aspect, above Saint Helens Lake

Highest point
- Elevation: 5,722 ft (1,744 m)
- Prominence: 720 ft (220 m)
- Parent peak: Mount Margaret (5,860 ft)
- Isolation: 2.41 mi (3.88 km)
- Coordinates: 46°18′00″N 122°10′55″W

Geography
- Location within Washington (state) Location within the United States
- Location: Mount St. Helens National Volcanic Monument; Skamania County, Washington, U.S.
- Parent range: Cascade Range
- Topo map: USGS Spirit Lake West

Geology
- Rock type: Tertiary volcanic rock
- Volcanic arc: Cascade Volcanic Arc

Climbing
- Easiest route: Hiking trail

Coldwater Peak is a 5,722 ft (1,740 m) mountain summit located in Mount St. Helens National Volcanic Monument, in the Gifford Pinchot National Forest, in Skamania County of southwest Washington state. It is situated in the Cascade Range, 2 mi (3.2 km) northwest of Spirit Lake, and 2 mi (3.2 km) east of Coldwater Lake. Its nearest higher neighbor is Mount Margaret, 2.4 mi (3.9 km) to the northeast, and Mount St. Helens rises 7 mi (11 km) to the south. Precipitation runoff from Coldwater Peak drains into Coldwater Creek, a tributary of the North Fork Toutle River. The mountain takes its name from this creek, and was officially adopted in 1983 by the U.S. Board on Geographic Names. A trail provides access to the summit, the site of the former Coldwater Lookout from 1935 to 1968, and now is a site for research instruments.

== Geology ==
The history of the formation of the Cascade Mountains dates back millions of years ago to the late Eocene Epoch. Geological events occurring many years ago created the diverse topography and drastic elevation changes over the Cascade Range leading to various climate differences. During the Pleistocene period dating back over two million years ago, glaciation advancing and retreating repeatedly scoured and shaped the landscape. With the North American Plate overriding the Pacific Plate, episodes of volcanic igneous activity occurred. The lateral blast from the 1980 eruption of Mount St. Helens was pointed straight toward Coldwater Peak and stripped the vegetation from the slopes. Due to Mount Saint Helens' proximity to Coldwater Peak, volcanic ash is common in the area.

== Climate ==
Coldwater Peak is located in the marine west coast climate zone of western North America. Most weather fronts originate in the Pacific Ocean, and travel northeast toward the Cascade Mountains. As fronts approach, they are forced upward by the peaks of the Cascade Range (Orographic lift), causing them to drop their moisture in the form of rain or snowfall onto the Cascades. As a result, the west side of the Cascades experiences high precipitation, especially during the winter months in the form of snowfall. During winter months, weather is usually cloudy, but due to high pressure systems over the Pacific Ocean that intensify during summer months, there is often little or no cloud cover during the summer. The months July through September offer the most favorable weather for viewing or climbing this peak.

== Gallery ==
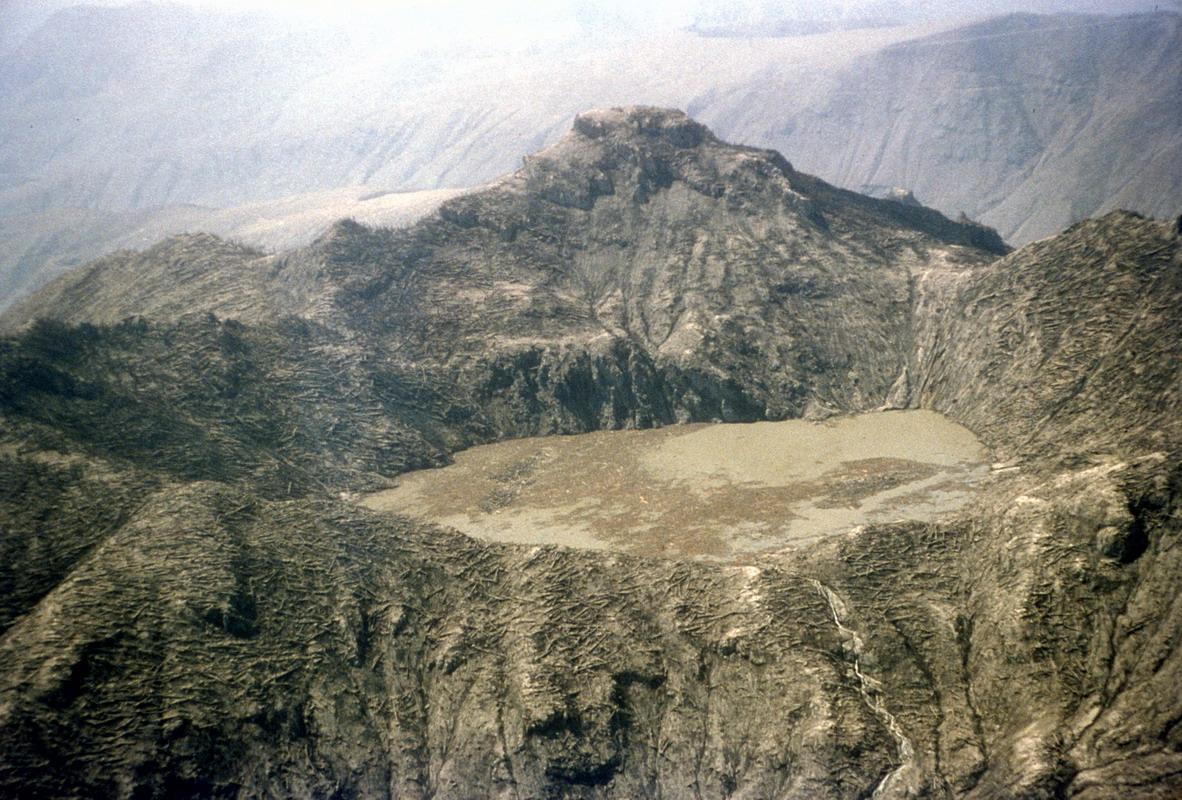
Ash-covered Coldwater Peak and St. Helens Lake on June 19, 1980, one month after eruption

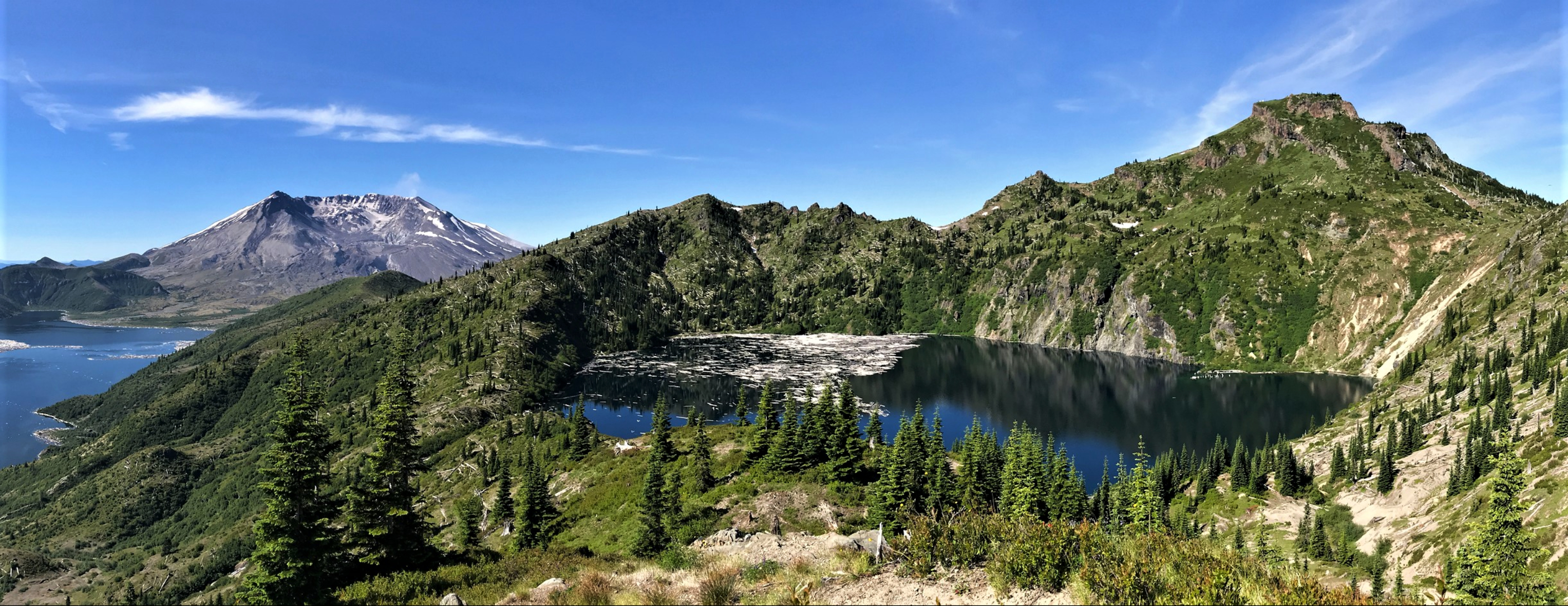
Spirit Lake, Mount St. Helens, St. Helens Lake, and Coldwater Peak

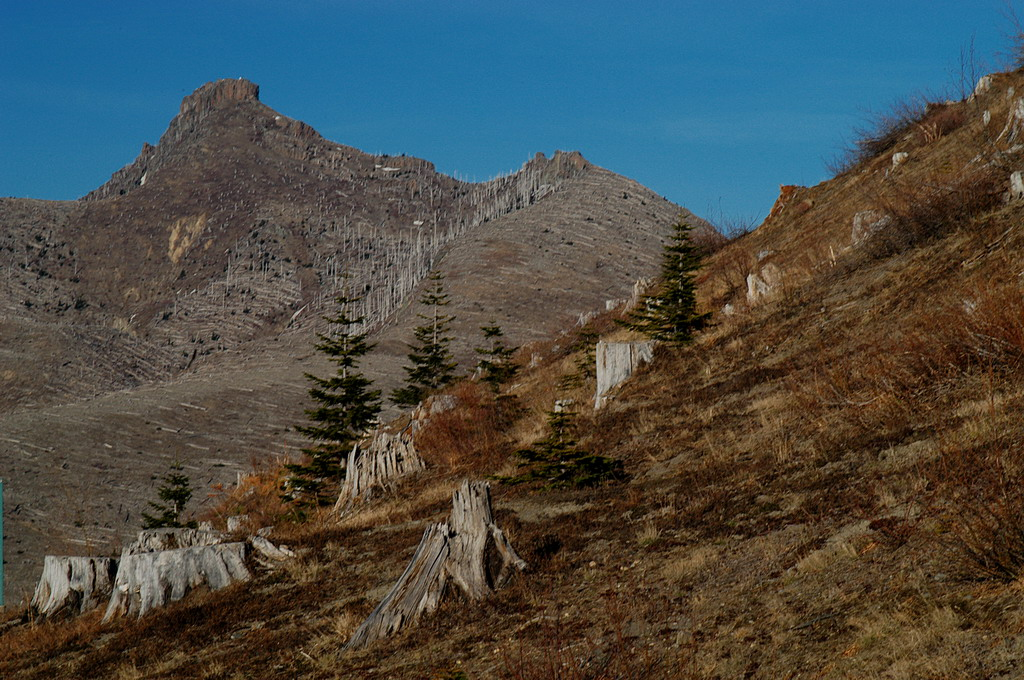
Coldwater Peak in 2005

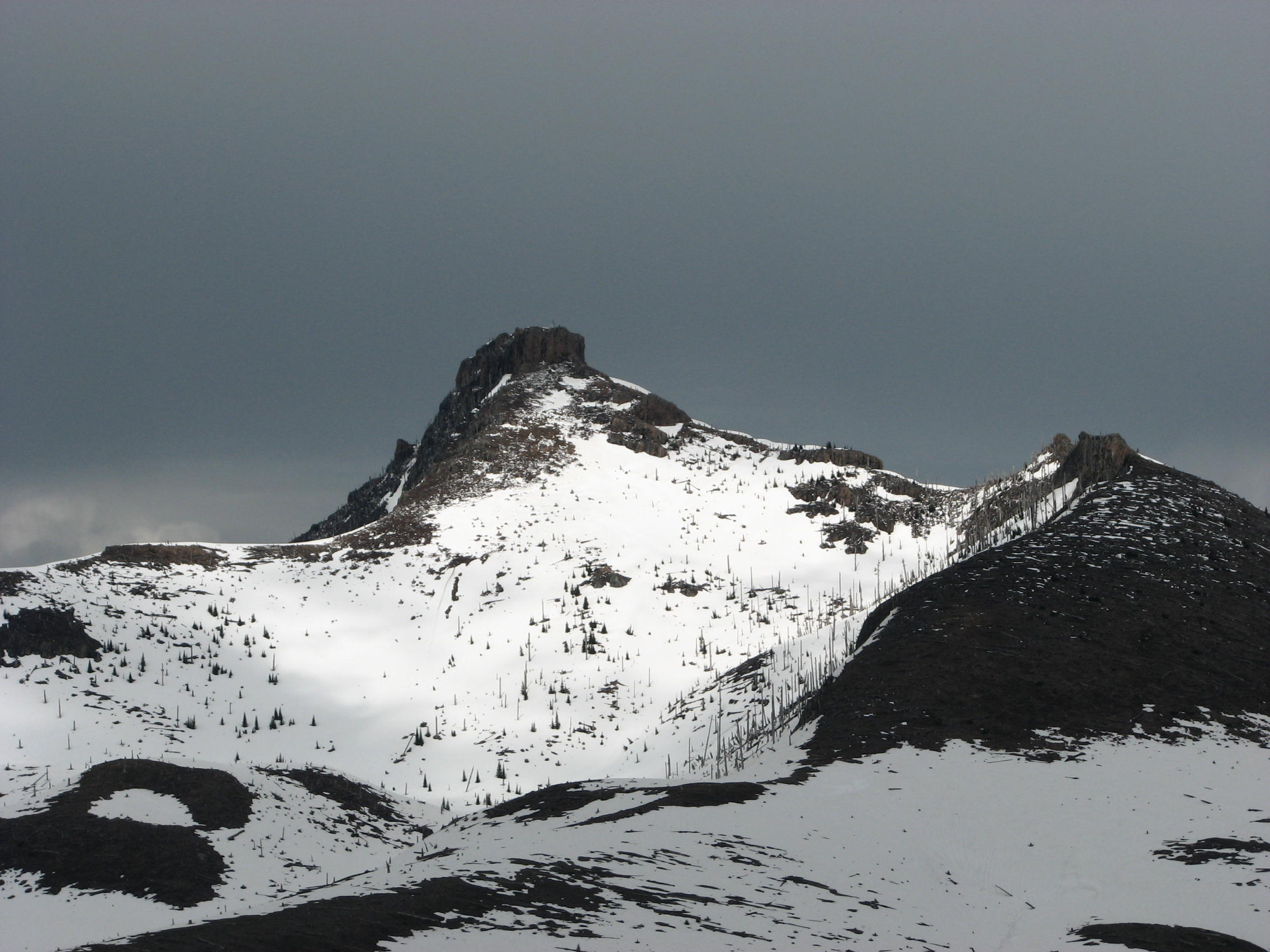

== See also ==
- Geology of the Pacific Northwest
- List of mountain peaks of Washington (state)
