= Lateral eruption =

Volcanic eruption which goes sideways

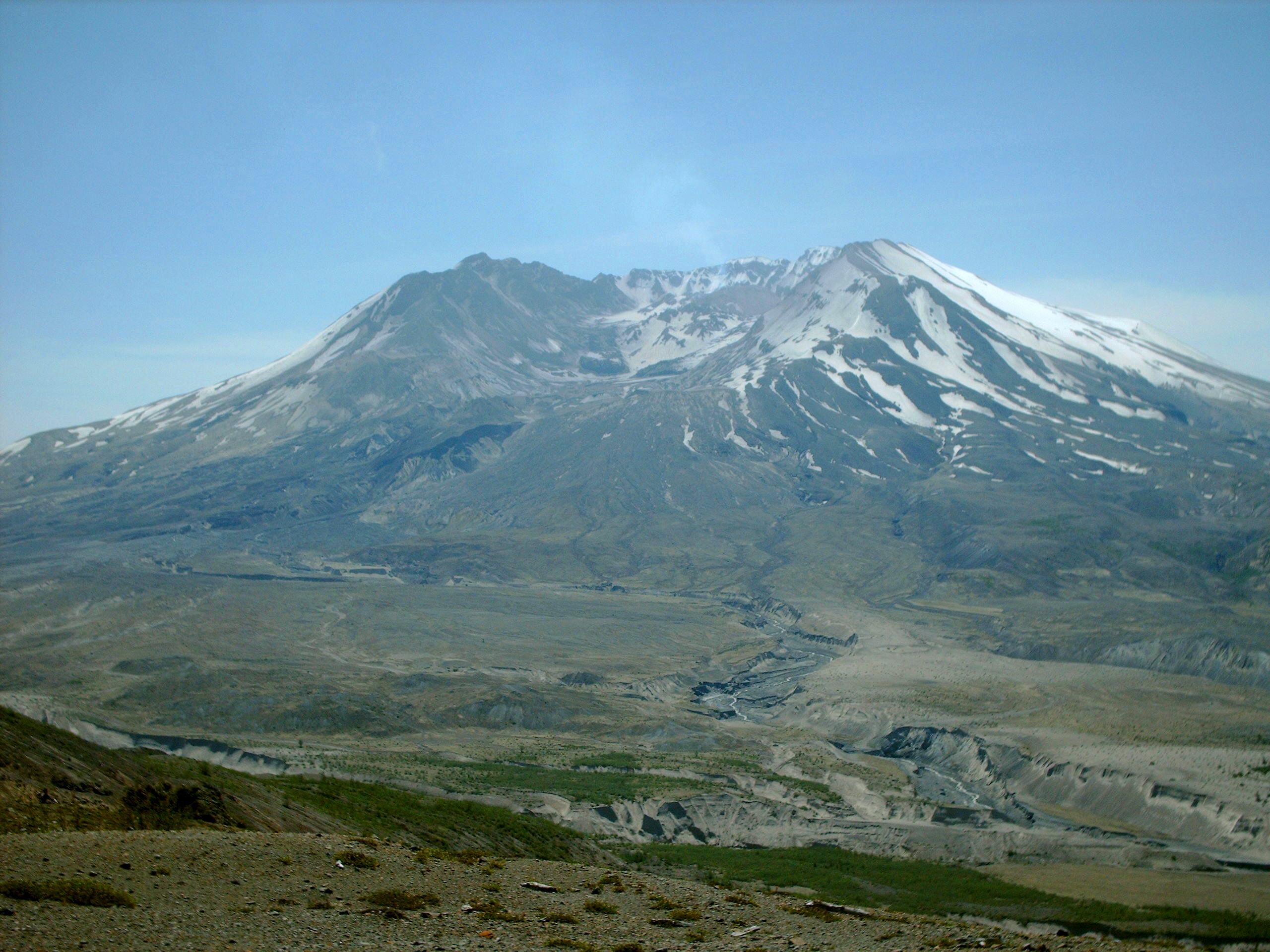
The May 18, 1980 eruption of Mount St. Helens is a well-known example of a lateral eruption.

A lateral eruption or lateral blast is a volcanic eruption which is directed laterally from a volcano rather than upwards from the summit. Lateral eruptions are caused by the outward expansion of flanks due to rising magma. Breaking occurs at the flanks of volcanoes making it easier for magma to flow outward. As magma is pushed upward towards the volcano it diverges towards the flanks before it has a chance to erupt from the crater. When the expanding flank finally gives it releases a flow of magma. More explosive lateral eruptions are referred to as lateral blasts. Some of the most notable examples of a lateral eruption include Mount St. Helens, Mount Pelée, and Mount Etna.

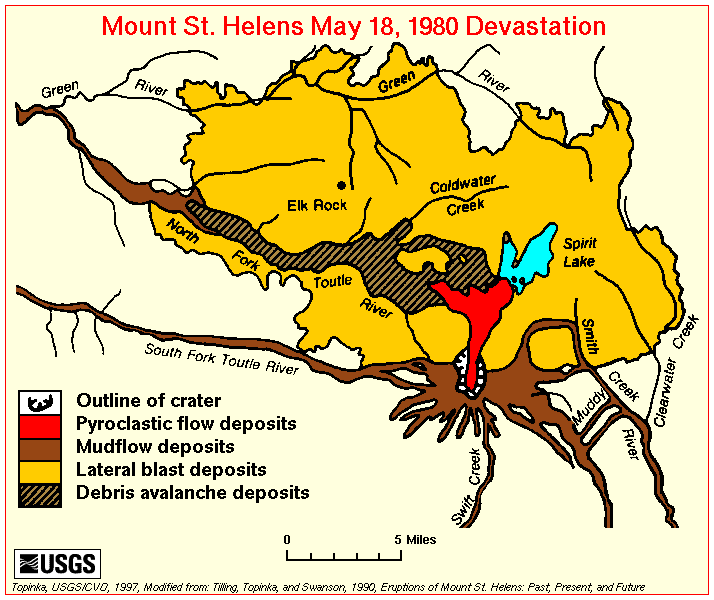
Eruption of Mount St. Helens and its deposits.

== Creation of a lateral eruption ==
Most eruptions are caused by the immediate decompression of a magma chamber near the flanks of the volcano. During an eruption, the rapid decompression of magma may cause subsidence of the mountain, and if a flank collapses, a lateral eruption occurs. The directed nature of the blast may cause damage at much greater distances from the peak than a summit eruption would have. Pyroclastic flows and lahars can affect areas originating from the volcano roughly in the shape of a cone that can span hundreds of square kilometers.

== Examples ==
Mount St. Helens is a stratovolcano located in Washington, USA. Volcanic activity beginning in March 1980 saw magma accumulating underneath the mountain's north flank. On May 18, 1980, an earthquake triggered the collapse of the flank and a lateral eruption which killed 57 people. It was the deadliest volcanic event in US history.

Bezymianny is a stratovolcano located on the Kamchatka peninsula in Russia. On March 30, 1956, it erupted laterally after a flank collapse similar to that experienced by Mount St. Helens. No fatalities resulted from this eruption due to the remote location of the volcano. Subsequent lava dome growth has since filled the 1956 caldera with a new cone.

Mount Pelée is a volcano located on Martinique, in the Caribbean. It underwent a lateral eruption on May 8, 1902, killing 28,000 people in the deadliest volcanic event of the 20th century.

San Francisco Peaks in Arizona are the remnants of a single taller volcano that may have had a lateral eruption around 200,000 years ago.

Nevado de Toluca is a stratovolcano to the west of Toluca, Mexico. About 25,000 years ago, Nevado de Toluca experienced a large, lateral blast to the east which reduced the elevation by about 900 m (3,000 ft). Like Mount Saint Helens, Nevado de Toluca also experienced dome building in the caldera subsequent to the blast.

Mount Meru (Tanzania) is a stratovolcano in Tanzania near Mount Kilimanjaro. About 7800 years ago, Mount Meru experienced a lateral blast to the east. Subsequent eruptions have occurred in the caldera since then, most recently in 1910.

== See also ==
- Sector collapse
