= Müller Matz =

Baltic card game

- Origin: Baltics
- Type: Shedding game
- Players: 2-8
- Cards: 52 (2–4 players); 104 (5–8 players)
- Deck: French
- Rank (high→low): natural, Aces high
- Play: Clockwise

Related games
- Durak, Melniki

Müller Matz is a shedding-type card game that was played in the first half of the 20th century, and probably in the 19th century, in the Baltics.

== Origin ==
The origin of Müller Matz ("Matz the Miller") may lie in a Russian card game called Melniki (Russian for "miller"). Most of the rules are the same. According to Rozaliev (1991), Melniki was a family game that was played by adults and children to while away their leisure time. He believed that it died out during the 20th century and was no longer encountered today, although Bernd Baron von Maydell has suggested that Müller Matz is still played by Baltic-German families. According to Grimm (1768), the term "Matz" was used as the name of a lowly or foolish man and thus corresponds to the Russian word Durak ("fool"). Since the first part of Müller Matz in particular resembles the well-known Russian card game, Durak, this may be an alternative origin of the game and its name. Müller Matz is clearly related to the popular Swedish game of Skitgubbe which may be descended from a Finnish game called Myllymatti, the name of a miller in Finnish folklore.

== Rules ==
If two to four play, one full pack of 52 cards is used minus the Jokers. If more play, two packs are used. Cards rank in their natural order, Aces high. Players play with their hand cards face down.

The game comprises two parts, known as 'lives' (Leben). The winner is the player who, at the end of the second life, is the first to shed all his cards.

=== First Life ===
The aim of the first life is to be able to start the second life with a good hand of cards. A general strategy is to collect trumps and high cards in each suit as far as possible, ready for the second life, but not too many.

Each player is dealt three cards initially; the rest are placed face down as a stock in the middle of the table. A card is turned and placed next to it to determine trumps. Players may exchange a Six or a Two for it, but only when it is their turn.

The cards are held face down. The player to the left of the dealer begins by playing a card to the player on his or her left.

There are now three options:

1. He can beat the card, either with a higher one of the same suit or any trump card. He then lays both cards face down in front of him for his second life and may then play a card to his left-hand neighbour.
2. He may discard a lower card, but he must then take both cards with him into the pile for his second life and then may play a card to his left. If two packs are used, the one to whom the first card was led, if he plays the same card, may decide whether to give the cards up or use them for his second life.
3. He can pick up the card; but may not then play a card. The turn passes to his left neighbour. As a result, players may end up with four or more cards in their hand. Players may draw a fresh card from the stock when they only have 2 cards left in their hand.

N.B. it is important not to forget to always draw a new card from the stock if you have fewer than three hand cards. If you have three trumps in your hand, you may "go to sleep", which means that you can lay them all down for your second life and replenish your hand with three more.

When the stock in the middle is exhausted, play continues until only one player has cards left in his hand, whereupon the first life is ended and the second one begins. When the stock is used up, players may 'go to sleep' with two trumps or a single trump.

=== Second Life ===
Play begins with the player who, in the first life, was first to shed their cards. He plays a card to the middle of the table, ideally the lowest card of his longest suit.

His left-hand neighbour has 3 options:

1. He can follow it with a higher card of the same suit, playing it onto the led card(s).
2. He can follow suit with a (higher) trump (preferably with his lowest trump), then the next player(s) must play trumps.
3. He can pick up the last card played to the middle, because he cannot or does not want to follow suit. Then turn passes to the next player to the left.

As soon as there are as many cards in the middle as there are players, the last card wins and the cards are taken out of play. The one who played the last card, leads to the next trick. The first player to shed all his cards has won. But this does not end the game; the remaining players continue to play. If cards are left on the table when a player goes out, they will still be beaten when there are as many cards as the number of players at the start of the trick. As soon as a new trick is started, it is won when the number of cards equals the, now reduced, number of players.

The player who is the last to have cards in his hand has lost.

== In popular culture ==
The game is mentioned in Else Hueck-Dehio's Tipsy's Special Love Life (Tipsys sonderliche Liebesgeschichte, 1959) which was set around the turn of the century (1900s). When Tipsy is asked to marry, she justifies her refusal by saying: "You are wasting your money in the most careless way... Yes, you play. You sit on the cliffs of Monte Carlo and play Müller Matz with the Prince of Monaco."

== Literature ==
- Hueck-Dehio, Else (1959), Tipsys sonderliche Liebesgeschichte. Eine Idylle aus dem alten Estland (in German), Heilbronn: E. Salzer, p. 76, ISBN 3-89808-003-X
- Grimm, J. (1768–70). "Matz". Vol. 12.
- Rozaliev, Nikolaj (1991). Kartočnye igry Rossii ("Card Games of Russia"), Moscow 1991.
