= Kaschlan =

Card game

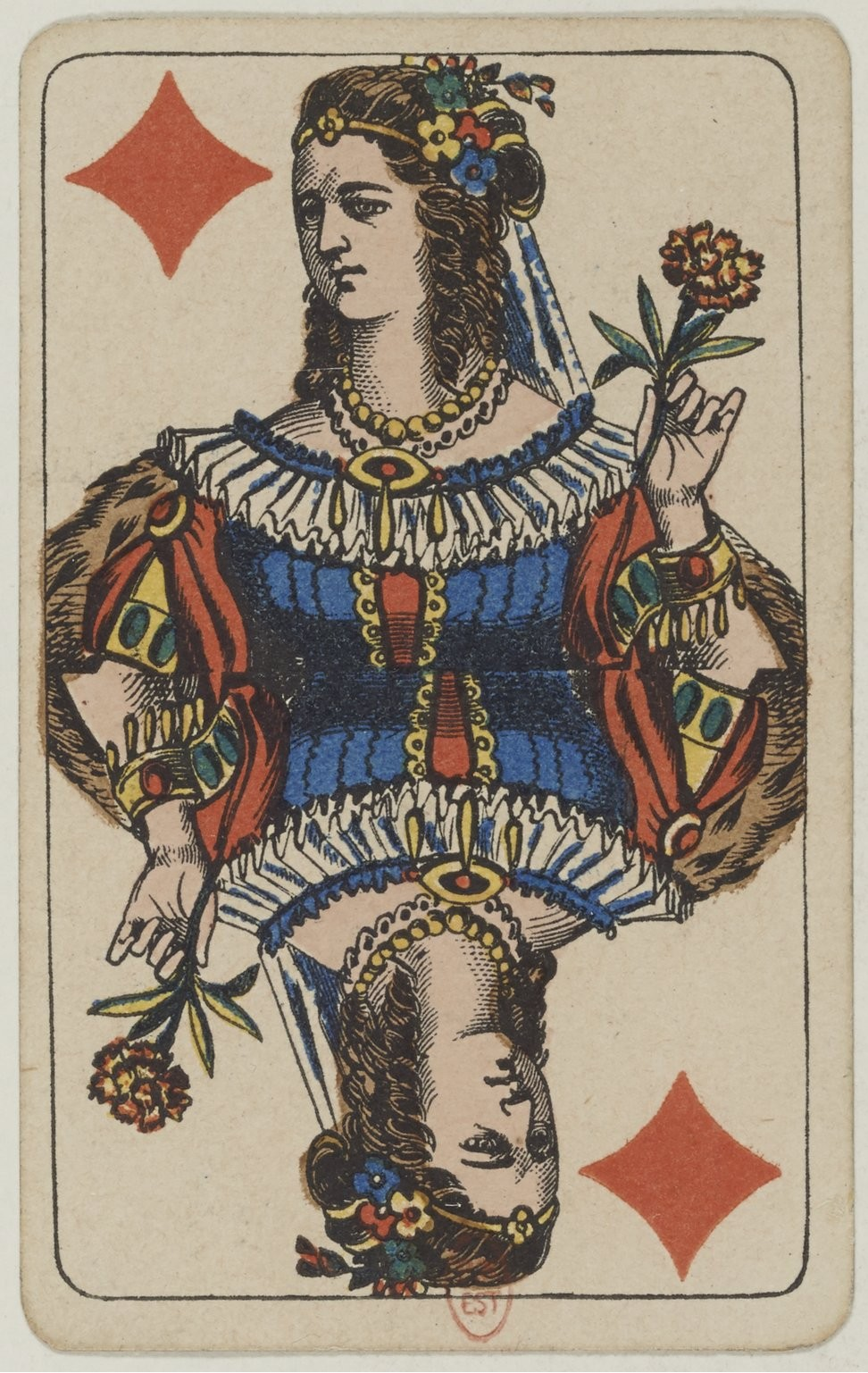
- The Kaschlan - the commanding card. From a 19th-century, Berlin-pattern pack.
- Origin: Prussian
- Alternative names: Kastellan, Kurrhahn
- Type: Shedding-type games
- Players: 2–5 (4 best)
- Age range: 10 and above
- Cards: 32
- Deck: French
- Rank (high→low): A K Q J 10 9 8 7 6
- Play: Clockwise
- Playing time: 5-15 min

Related games
- Durak • Hund

Kaschlan, Kastellan or Kurrhahn was a simple card game related to the Russian game Durak or German game of Hund. It is for two to five players (four best) and may be played with a Skat pack of 32 French- or German-suited playing cards or a standard 52-card French pack.

== Origin ==
The origin of Kaschlan is not certain but it seems to have surfaced in German East Prussia in the early 19th century. In 1882, Frischbier describes Kaschlan as "a popular family game in which the Kaschlan, Kaschlansche or Kaschlanka, Polish kasztelanka, (Queen of Diamonds), is the highest card." Thus the name, both of the game and its top trump, comes from the Polish kasztelan which means "castellan" and its resemblance to Durak suggests that it may have been originally Polish or Russian. Nevertheless, by the mid-19th century, it was a popular Prussian card game, especially among children and women, and was well known enough to lend its name to Prussian idioms. For example, der Magen spielt mit dem Darm Kaschlan meant, literally, "my stomach's playing Kaschlan with my bowels" i.e. "my tummy's rumbling" or "I'm hungry". Näs' on Muul spiele Kaschlan (in Danzig: Kurrhahn, "turkey" or "irascible person") meant "[his/her] nose and mouth are playing Kaschlan" and referred to old people who had lost their teeth and so their nose and chin were so close that they appeared to move together.

The game is not recorded in German gaming compendia and, by 1873, was described as "no longer common" in Danzig, West Prussia, but was still "a well known game of chance" in East Prussia in 1888. Nevertheless, references to it continue to appear during the early 20th century. Frischbier records that there was often a lot of cheating to avoid becoming the "Kaschlan", a nickname for the loser.

Playing cards marketed inter alia for Kasztelanskie were still being produced in Poland in 1972.

== Cards ==
The game is played with a normal Skat pack of 32 French-suited cards. If German playing cards are used, the Obers replace the Queens and the Unters the Jacks, as normal. The Queen of Diamonds, the Kaschlan, is the commanding card and the only permanent trump. Apart from that, cards rank in their natural order: A > K > Q > J > 10 > 9 > 8 > 7.

Historically it is recorded that the game was also played with a 52-card pack. There were also 24-card packs sold in Poland for Kasztelańskie.

== Rules ==
The game is like a simple variant of multi-player, cut-throat Durak. The following rules are based on Illig:

=== Aim ===
The aim is to shed one's hand cards as quickly as possible. The last player left holding any cards is the loser.

=== Preparations ===
The dealer shuffles the pack, offers it to rearhand (to his right) to cut and then deals 5 cards to each player. The rest of the cards form the stock or talon and are placed in the middle of the table. The dealer turns the top card to indicate which suit is trumps. Players pick up their cards and play begins.

=== Play ===
Forehand (to the dealer's left) now becomes the 'attacker' or 'giver' (Geber) and the player to his left becomes the 'defender' or 'taker' (Nehmer). The attacker places one or more cards of the same rank (e.g. Tens or Kings) in front of the defender. Either way, the attacker may not play more cards than the defender holds in his hand. The attacker then replenishes his hand from the talon, so that he has five cards. If another player also has cards of same rank as the card or cards on the table, he may reinforce the attacker by playing it and replenishing his hand likewise.

By this point there will be up to 4 cards on the table. The defender now attempts to capture all these cards individually, placing the captured cards on a common wastepile to one side. A plain-suit card (i.e. non-trump) may be beaten by a higher card of the same suit or by a trump card. A trump card may only be beaten by a higher trump.

Example (without trumps): the attacker places the ♦8 and ♠8 in front of the defender. If he now has fewer than 5 cards in his hand, he makes it up to 5 from the stock. Another player has the ♥8 in his hand and reinforces the attack by laying it next to the other Eights. If the defender has ♦K ♥J ♥A ♣8 and ♣A, he may place the ♣8 with the other Eights. He can then beat the ♦8 with the ♦K, the ♥8 with the ♥J and his ♣8 with the ♣A. He is unable to beat the ♠8 and must therefore pick it up. The attacker now lays down more cards.

Only when the defender has beaten all the cards played, may he replenish his hand from the stock, so that he has five cards again, and take over the role of attacker; whereupon the player to his left becomes the new defender. If the defender has to pick up a card because he cannot beat it. the attacker lays further cards down.

=== Going out ===
When a player is able to shed all his hand cards, he goes out and takes no further part in the game. If he was the attacker, the player before him becomes the new attacker and the defender stays the same. If he was the defender and succeeded in beating all the cards played, the next player in turn becomes the defender and the attacker stays the same. In unlikely event that both attacker and defender shed all their cards, the player after the defender becomes the new attacker.

The last player to hold any cards loses the game and is ribbed as the Kaschlan.

== Variants ==
In the 52-card game, if the attacker plays two or more cards of the same rank, he may add another card of his choice, called the 'coachman' (Kutscher). There may therefore be up to 5 cards on the table for the defender to try to beat, including the coachman.

In another variant, if the defender is unable to beat all the cards, the role of attacker rotates rather than remaining the same.

== Literature ==
- _ (1888). Zeitschrift des Historischen Vereins für den Reg.-Bezirk Marienwerder, Issues 22–28. Self-pub, Kwidzyn, Poland.
- _ (1916). Mitteilungen, Vols. 20–27, Literarische Gesellschaft Masovia.
- Frischbier, Hermann (1865). Preußische Sprichwörter und volksthümliche Redensarten, Bd. 1. Enslin, Berlin.
- Frischbier, Hermann (1882). Preussisches Wörterbuch, Vol 1. Enslin, Berlin.
- Wander, Karl Friedrich Wilhelm (1873). Deutsches Sprichwörter-Lexikon: Ein Hausschatz für das deutsche Volk, Volume 3, Lehrer to Satte. Brockhaus, Leipzig.
- Moeser, W. (1916). Die Frau: Monatsschrift für das gesamte Frauenleben unserer Zeit, Volume 23.
