= Durak =

Russian card game

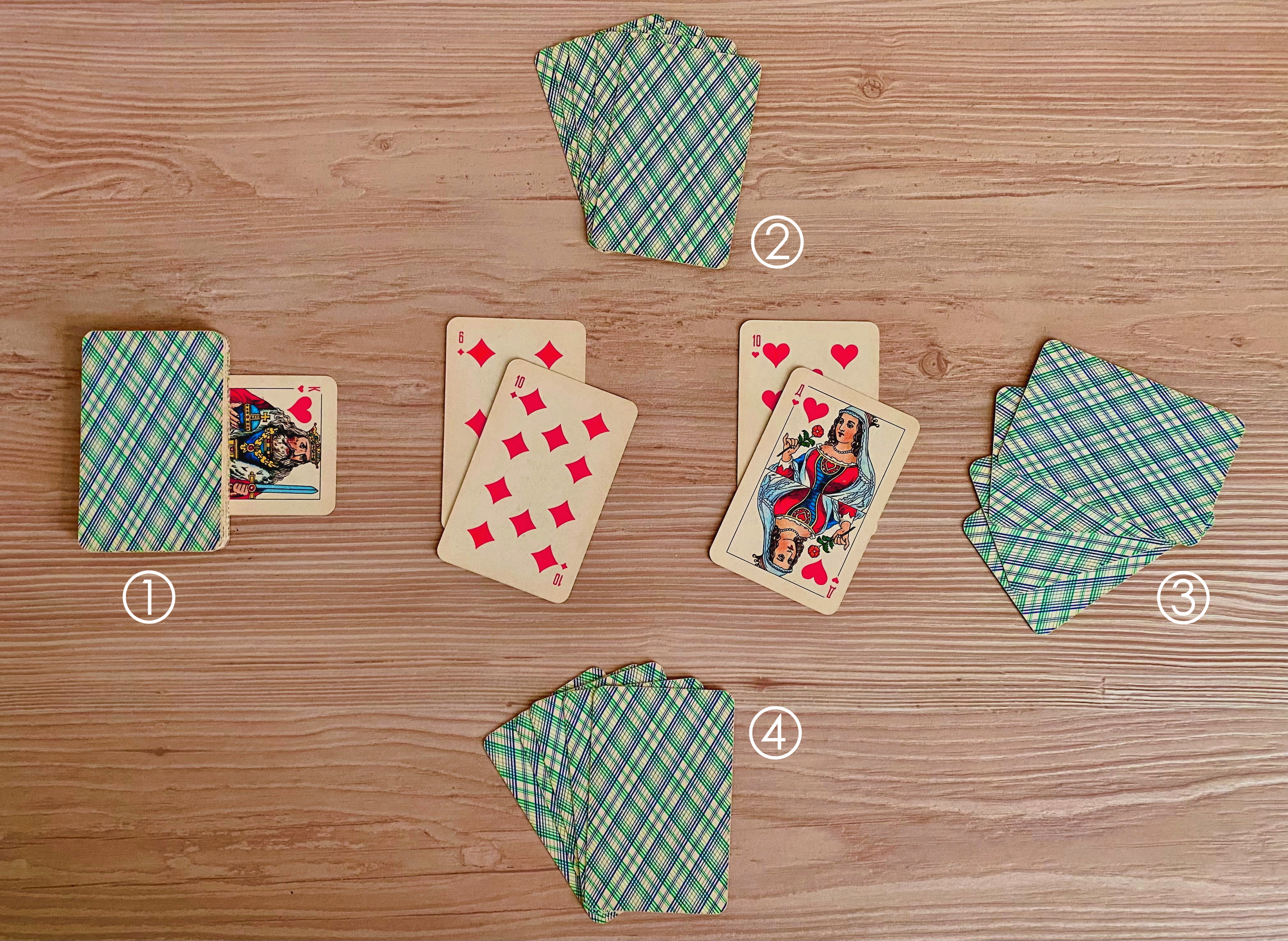
- A game of regular durak in progress 1 – deck, 2 – first attacker, 3 – defender, 4 – next defender.
- Origin: Russia
- Alternative names: Fool, Russian War, Kur
- Type: Shedding-type games
- Players: 2–6
- Skills: Probability, strategy, memory
- Age range: 10 and above (assuming appropriate maturity)
- Cards: 36–52
- Deck: French
- Rank (high→low): A K Q J 10 9 8 7 6
- Play: Clockwise
- Playing time: 5–15 min

Related games
- Cheat • Kaschlan

Durak (Russian: дурак, IPA: [dʊˈrak]; lit. 'fool') is a traditional Russian card game that is popular in many post-Soviet states. It is Russia's most popular card game, having displaced Preferans. It has since become known in other parts of the world. The objective of the game is to shed all one's cards when there are no more cards left in the deck. At the end of the game, the last player with cards in their hand is the durak or 'fool'.

The game is attributed to have appeared in late 18th-century Russian Empire and was popularized by Imperial Army conscripts during the 1812 Russo-French war. Initially a social pastime of uneducated peasants and industrial workers, after the October Revolution Durak has spread to numerous social levels by mid-20th century to soon become the most popular Soviet card game.

== Setup ==
The game is typically played with two to five people, with six players if desired, using a deck of 36 cards, for example a standard 52-card deck from which the numerical cards 2 through 5 have been removed. In theory, the limit for a game with one deck of 36 cards is six players, but this extends a considerable advantage to the player who attacks first, and a considerable disadvantage to the player who defends first. Variants exist that use more than one deck.

The deck is shuffled, and each player is dealt six cards. The bottom card of the stock is turned and placed face up on the table, its suit determining the trump suit for the current deal. For example, if it is the 7 of diamonds, then diamonds rank higher than all plain-suit cards. The rest of the pack is then placed over the turn-up at right angles to it so that it remains visible. These cards form the prikup or talon. The turn-up remains part of the talon and is drawn as the last card. Cards discarded due to successful defences are placed in a discard pile next to the talon.

== Playing ==
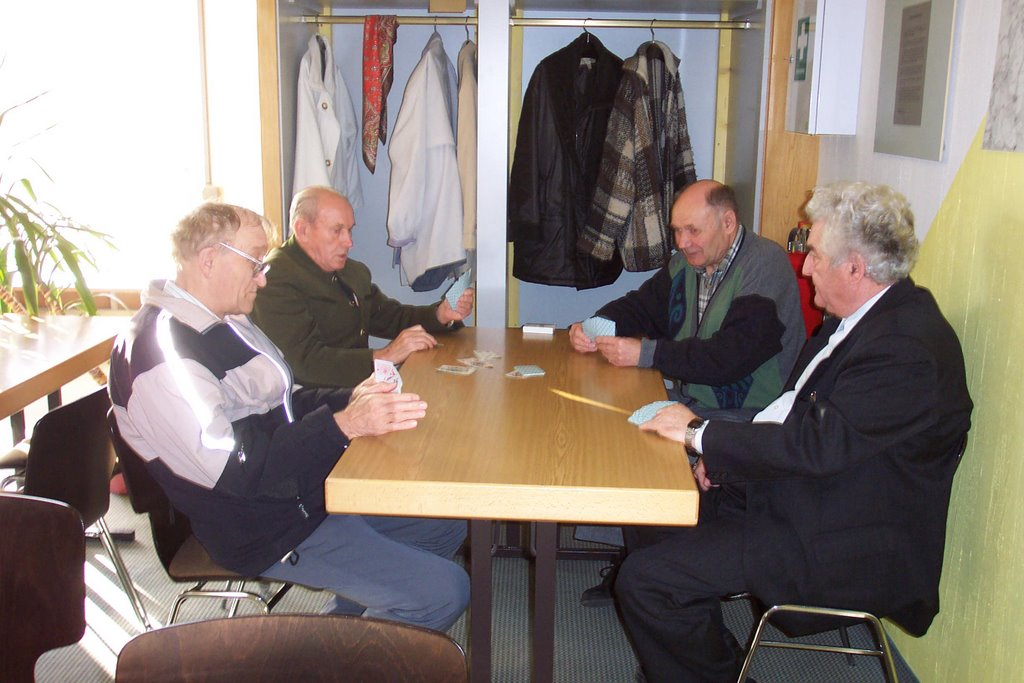
A group of seniors playing durak

The player who has the lowest trump card will be the first attacker (note that there is no obligation to play that lowest trump card as the first card). The player to the attacker's left is always the defender. After each round of attack play proceeds clockwise. If the attack succeeds (see below), the defender loses their turn and the attack passes to the player on the defender's left. If the attack fails, the defender becomes the next attacker.

=== First attack ===
Cards are ranked 6 7 8 9 10 J Q K A (ascending order, ace high). A trump card of any rank beats all cards in the other three suits. For example, a 6 of trumps beats an ace of any other suit.

The attacker opens their turn by playing a card face up on the table as an attacking card. The player to the attacker's left is the defender. They respond to the attack with a defending card.

=== Defending ===
The defender attempts to beat the attack card by playing a higher-ranking defending card from their hand. For example, if the attacker plays a 7♠ the defender must play a higher spade such as the 10♠ or a card from the trump suit to defend successfully. The defender must play a higher card of the same suit as the attack card or play a card of the trump suit (there is no obligation to play the card of the same suit; you can use trump cards to beat off the attack anytime). The defending cards are placed on top of the attack card overlapping it, so both cards are visible and it is clear which cards are attacking and defending cards.

After the first attack, if the defender is successful, the attacker may launch a new attack. If they cannot or if they pass, then the player to the left of the defender may start a new attack or pass the chance to attack to the next non-defender going clockwise around the table. For each new attack which is defended successfully by the defender, the player who led that attack (played the last attack card) may start a new attack. After the original attack, attacks can only be made if the new attack card matches the rank of any card which has already been played during that round. If the player who led the last attack chooses not to attack again (and all future attacks during the round of attacks) then the original attacker may make a new attack, if they pass on making an attack then players to the defenders left may attack or pass and so on going clockwise around the table. There cannot be more than six attacks in each round. Each new attack card is placed to the left of the last attack card and the defender plays their defending card on top of the new attack card creating a row of attack and defence cards. The defender must respond to the new attack in the same fashion as the first attack by playing a card of the same suit of the new attack card with a higher rank or a trump card. All other players may make a new attack if the defender has successfully defended the last attack. The original attacker has priority for making an attack, then the player to defender's left has priority and so forth going clockwise. Some variants only allow cards to be added to the attack once the first defending card has been played.

At any point during a round of attacks, if a defender is unwilling or unable to beat the most recent attack card, they may give up their defence and must pick up all the cards played during that round of attack (both defending and attacking). At this point, the other players may choose to shed cards matching ranks of any cards that have already been played during this round, with priority going to the last attacker and continuing clockwise to each non-defender, up to a maximum of 6 attacking cards, which the defender must also pick up. In this case the round of attacks ends and the player to the defender's left starts a new round of attacks.

If, however, the defender has beaten all attacking cards and no other players are willing to make another attack or if the defender beats the sixth attack card, the defender has won the round of attacks. In this case all cards from that round of attack are placed in the discard pile and the defender starts a new round of attacks as the attacker and the player to his or her left becomes the new defender.

No players may examine the discard pile at any point.

=== End of turn ===
At the end of each round of attacks against a defender, whether or not the defence was successful, each player draws new cards from the deck until they have six cards in their hand unless the deck has been exhausted. The main attacker draws as many cards as necessary first, followed by any other attackers in clockwise order, and finally the defender. If the talon is exhausted, and a player has played all their cards, they are eliminated from the game.

=== Winning and losing ===
The last person left with cards in their hand is the loser (the fool or durak). In some variants, this player becomes the dealer for the next round. The player to the fool's right may become the first attacker for the next round.

Some variants declare the winner of the round to be the first player to empty their hand and leave the game. In others, there are no winners, only the loser.

=== Team play ===
Four players can play as two pairs. Six can play as three teams of two, or two teams of three. The members of each team sit opposite one another (with two players on each team), or alternating (with three). In some variants, the team with the lowest trump starts the first round, but in subsequent rounds the winning team from the previous round begins.

When playing in teams, players may not add to attacks on their teammates.

=== Fool with epaulettes ===
If the last card played by an attacker is a six, and the defender loses, the defender is cheerfully pronounced durak s galstukom (lit. 'a fool with a necktie'), and the six card may be symbolically placed on their chest. This is worse than declaring the loser simply as a durak, because of the handicap of having a low-value Six through the final part of the game. If the attacker plays two sixes, the loser is even called a durak with "epaulettes on both shoulders" in Russian "durak s pogonami".

Some variants use the ties as scoring points. If someone has a six as a tie, the opponents must next score against them using a seven, and so on until someone receives an ace as a tie. To score, the winning individual or team must not only end with the correct tie value, but must include at least one non-trump card in the final attack. As it goes with two sixes either. That being said, not all variants use the "fool with epaulette" rule, some simply ignore the defender who lost to a six and simply call them the durak.

== Variants ==
| Variant name | Variant description |
|---|---|
| Spades by spades | Spades may not be beaten by trump, only by other spades. The trump suit cannot be spades. Note that spades do not beat trump; they act as a special suit, not a super-trump. |
| Gopher fool | There is no winner but there is a loser, and the loser has to do pre-hand mutually determined torturous feats. |
| Crazy durak | The same as "spades by spades", along with the rule that the trump suit is always diamonds. |
| Without trumps | There is no trump suit. |
| Siege durak / Podkidnoy (Throw-in) durak | Allows for multi-card (of the same rank) opening attacks, and simultaneous attacks from multiple players after the initial attack. |
| Fallen Ace / Lowest trump card beats trump Ace | This rule allows trump Ace to be beaten by lowest trump card in a deck, so it's no longer an unbeatable super-card. Trump Ace can still beat any card, including the card that beats it. |
| Albanian durak | The trump card is placed on top of the talon instead of on the bottom. |
| Vietnamese durak (Bài tấn) | Play with 52 cards for 2 to 4 players. In this variation, 8 cards rather than 6 are initially dealt. |
| Changeable trump | Another card is placed face down under the visible trump. When one of the players draws the visible trump card, the hidden card is revealed and determines the trump suit for the rest of the game. It may then be drawn as normal. |
| Railway durak | At the beginning of the game the whole of deck is distributed to the players, except one card to determine trump. |
| Poker durak | Players can change any two cards in their hand for any two cards in the talon before their turn. Each player can do this only 3 times in the game. |
| Full durak | The game can also be played with a full deck with or without jokers, with 2s as the lowest card rather than 6s. If playing with Jokers, a Joker of a particular color beats any card of that color. |
| Weli | Named after the 6 of Bells in the William Tell deck. In this variation, 6s become wild cards, keeping the rank of 6 but taking on any suit the player chooses. |
| Ještěrka durak | Named after a punk dive bar in Prague where it was invented and frequently played in the early 1990s. In this variation, 5 cards rather than 6 are initially dealt. The highest cards of the trump suit are the jack of that suit and the jack of the same color suit as trump. |

In a common variation called Perevodnoy ("transferrable" or "reversible") durak, a defender may pass to the next player if they have a card of the same rank. The defender adds this card to the pile and the next player becomes the defender. The defender now becomes the new attacker, and the player to their left becomes the new defender and must beat all cards played by the attacker. Passing is not allowed if the new defender has fewer cards in their hand than would be in the passed attack. In games involving four or fewer players, it is possible for the attack to pass all the way around the table, so that the original attacker ends up defending against their own attack.

One variation of passing called proyezdnoy ("drive-by") or pokaznoy ("showing") allows a defender who holds the trump of the same rank to simply show the card to pass the attack on and become the new attacker. The holder of the trump card of the same rank may play it at any time during the attack. If playing with fewer than 4 players, it is possible for the attack to be passed all the way around and come back to the holder of the trump card again. In this case the holder cannot show or play the same card again in order to pass the attack a second time.

== See also ==
- Games of skill
- Paskahousu
- President (card game)
- Shithead (card game)
- Poker (card game)
- Rummy (card game)

== Literature ==
- Parlett, David (2008). The Penguin book of card games. London: Penguin. ISBN 978-0-141-03787-5.
- Chramov S.Y., Chramov Y.I (2023). LET'S PLAY SOME CARDS! PART 1. "THE DUMMY FOOL": HISTORY, VICTORY STRATEGY, VARIETIES (THE FIRST ENCYCLOPEDIA IN THE WORLD ON THE "DUMMY FOOL"). THE BEST MAGIC TRICKS AND SOLITAIRE GAMES. Russia: Cheboksary. ISBN 978-5-907619-78-4.
