= Shithead =

Shithead is a derogatory term for a person who is ignorant, narrow minded, cruel or unintelligent. It is generally considered to be a vulgar and profane term.

It may also refer to:

- Shithead (card game)
- "Shithead", a song by The Haunted found on the album One Kill Wonder
- Shithead, name of a dog owned by Navin R. Johnson (Steve Martin) in the film The Jerk (1979)
- Joey "Shithead" Keithley, punk musician from the band D.O.A.
- Shithead, a character in the comic book Wanted

== See also ==
- Chicken shit
