= Pjotr Pustoroslev =

Russian lawyer

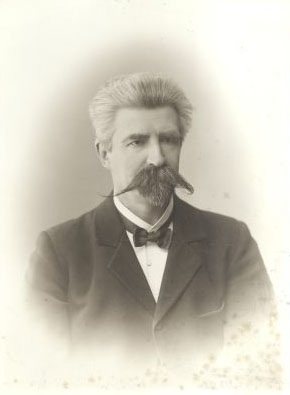
Pjotr Pustoroslev

Pjotr Pustoroslev (1854–1928) was a Russian lawyer. He was the rector of Tartu University from 1915 to 1917.

He taught criminal law at Tartu University.

== Biography ==
Pustoroslev was born on January 22, 1854 into the noble family of the Pustoroslevs. He graduated from the Faculty of Law of the Imperial Moscow University.

As a privat-docent for seven years he taught prison studies at Moscow University. In the journal Legal Bulletin No. 12 for 1891, he published a large article telling about the Moscow Committee for the analysis and charity of the poor.

He received a master's degree for his dissertation: Понятие о незаменимой саморасправе как учреждении уголовного права, (The concept of indispensable self-destruction as an institution of criminal law), a doctorate degree for the dissertation: Анализ понятия о преступлении, (Analysis of the concept of crime). He was a professor of criminal law, dean of the Faculty of Law of the Imperial University of Dorpat; in 1915-1917 he was its rector.

He left Tartu in 1918 due to the evacuation of the university to Voronezh. He died in Moscow, buried at the Novodevichy Cemetery.

== Selected writings ==
- Criminalité et imputabilité (Yuriev: Matthiesen, 1899) read online
- Анализ понятія о преступленіи (Moscow: 1892) read online

== Bibliography ==
- Arsenyev, Konstantin; Petrushevsky, Fyodor (1898). Brockhaus and Efron Encyclopedic Dictionary (in Russian). Vol. XXVa (1898): Простатит — Работный дом. Friedrich A. Brockhaus (Leipzig), Ilya A. Efron (St. Petersburg). p. 809—810.

| Preceded by Vissarion Alekseyev | Rector of the Imperial University of Dorpat; 1915–1917 | Succeeded by Vissarion Alekseyev |
