= Skitgubbe =

Card game

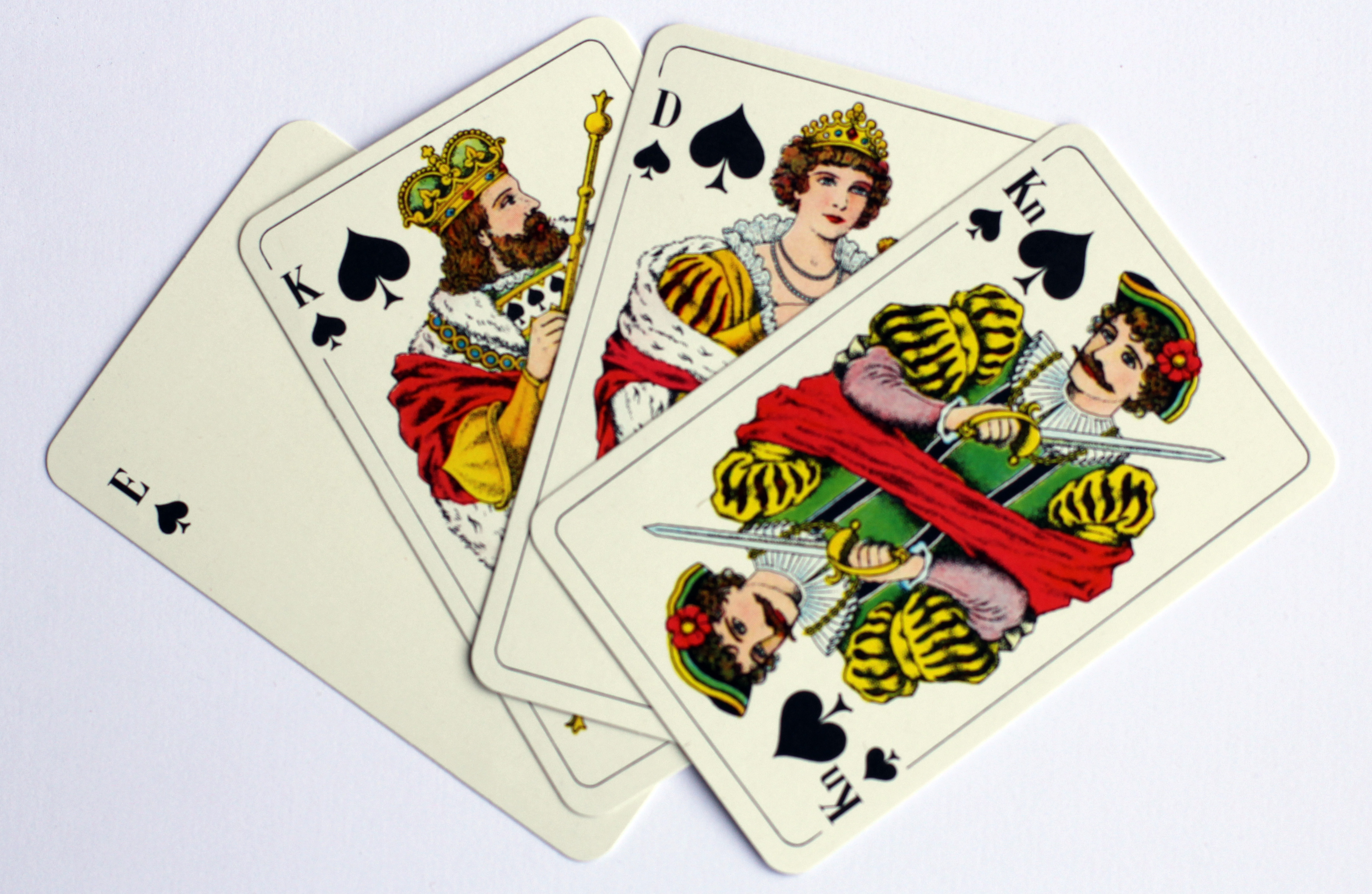
- The highest spades in a modern Swedish pattern pack
- Origin: Sweden
- Alternative names: Mjölnarmatte, Mjölis, Mas, Flurst
- Players: 2-4 (3 best)
- Cards: 52
- Deck: Modern Swedish pattern, French-suited pack
- Rank (high→low): A K Q J 10 9 8 7 6 5 4 3 2
- Play: Clockwise

Skitgubbe, (Note: Translated by David Parlett as "dirty old man", where "dirty" is used in the sense of "grubby" rather than "lewd".) (Swedish pronunciation: [ˈɧîːtˌgɵbːɛ]) and also called Mas, Mjölis, Mjölnarmatte, or Flurst (in the United States), is a popular Swedish card game that is rated as one of the best for three players. It has two phases: in the first, players accumulate cards; in the second players aim to discard the accumulated hand. The last player to go out is the skitgubbe. Sometimes, the skitgubbe must make a goat noise.

The first phase is unusual for a trick-taking game, in that there is asynchronous sloughing of cards that match played cards, while play goes around the table.

== History ==
Skitgubbe's predecessor is probably the Finnish game of Myllymatti, which is first mentioned in 1808. The Finnish word is a combination of mylly, which means mill, and Matti, which is the Finnish form of the name Mats. The miller Mylly Matti is part of Finnish folklore and is described by Zacharias Topelius as a good-hearted, easily deceived fellow who often walks around with a sack. The Finnish name of the game was translated to Mjölnarmatte in Swedish and was first mentioned under this name in 1875. Mjölnarmatte was soon simplified to Mjölis (known since 1890) and mas (known since 1905). Mas can be understood both as a lazy and tardy person and as a transformation of the name Mats. The name Skitgubbe for the game has been known since 1953, but did not begin to be used in gaming literature until the 1980s.

The first Swedish rules were published in Kortoxen in 1949 under the name Mas. Today the game is usually called Skitgubbe or Mas. The name Mas occurs especially in parts of the country where Skitgubbe is used for the game of Vändtia. According to the games expert Dan Glimne, today's Skitgubbe is one of the most played card games in Sweden. In Finland the game is now called Koira, which means dog, and in Norway a similar game is played called Mattis .

It is unclear how the rules of the game have evolved over time. Closely related games were formerly played in German-speaking circles in the Baltics under the name Müller Matz (a direct translation of Myllymatti into German) and in Russia under the name Melniki ("miller"). The rules of the Russian game are very similar to a variant described in Kortoxen and called Mas with upturned trump. It is possible that this corresponds to an original or early variant of the game.

== Rules ==
Skitgubbe is a game for three or more players using a regular fifty-two card pack without jokers. There are a large number of rule variations, and some of the most common are given below. The denominations have the usual ranking with Aces at the top and Deuces at the bottom.

The game has two different phases. In the first phase, the players try to take cards that give as favourable a starting position as possible before the second phase, where you must get rid of the cards again as quickly as possible. The game is about avoiding being the last person sitting with cards in hand. Whoever does that has lost and become a "skitgubbe". So there is no winner, only a loser.

=== Deal ===
The dealer deals three cards each, clockwise, starting with forehand, the player on the left. The cards are normally dealt singly. The remaining cards are placed face down in the middle of the table and form the talon.

=== Phase 1 ===
Phase 1 is a trick-taking round where the winner of a trick captures all the cards in it. In some variants of Skitgubbe only two players play for each trick in this phase, in other variants everyone plays for each trick. The latter is probably the most common way to play these days.

The suit normally doesn't matter in the first phase, but there is an older variation where you play with the trump upcard and where the trick can only be won by the highest trump or the highest card of the led suit if no trumps are played. This variant is now rare.

==== Two-player tricks ====
Forehand leads to the first trick, and the player next in clockwise order also plays a card. Whoever plays the highest rank wins the trick; suit doesn't matter. If both play the same rank or denomination, it is called "countering" or "bouncing" or a "counterplay". The players then play one more card each. If both play the same denomination again, they play another card again and so on. After each card played, the player immediately draws a new card from the talon, so that players always have three cards in their hands. A player with poor cards in hand may play the top card from the talon to the trick. This is called 'taking a chance' or 'daring'.

Trick play continues in the same way as in the first trick. Only two players play to each trick. The winner of a trick leads to the next, and the player immediately to the left plays as the second (and last) person to the trick.

The player who draws the last card from the talon may neither look at this card nor play it to a trick, but leaves it face down next to self. Players continue to play with the cards in their hands. If the person who should lead to a trick is out of cards, the turn to lead continues clockwise. The same principle applies if the player who plays last to the trick has no cards. The trick taking continues until there are no longer at least two players with enough cards to complete a trick.

If the last trick cannot be decided because there has been a counterplay and either player has no cards left, the players take back the cards they played to the trick and add up their tricks taken. (Note: The sources are unclear as to what happens if a counterplay cannot be completed, but enough players have cards left for the game to continue.)

==== All-player tricks ====
Forehand leads one or more equally ranked cards to the first trick. Other players in clockwise order then take turns playing one or more equally ranked cards. Suit is irrelevant. A player who has played to the trick draws an equal number of new cards from the talon, so that players have three cards in their hands at all times.

The trick is won by the player who played the card or cards of the highest rank. If more than one player has played cards of the highest rank, those players play to the trick once more in the same turn order. Whoever plays the highest card(s) wins. If the trick is still undecided, the players who played the highest card(s) the second time continue to play to the trick once more, and so on if it happens again. Players constantly replenishing their hands from the talon so that they have three cards. Playing card(s) of the same rank as the highest cards that have already been played to the trick is called making a "counterplay".

When the trick, including any counterplays, is decided and players have replenished their hands to three cards, those players who so wish may add additional cards to the trick pile of denominations that are already there. This is called "sloughing" or "sluffing" and does not affect who wins the trick. The players then draw an equal number of new cards from the talon to bring their hands back up to three cards. A player may slough cards of more than one denomination, but after the player has drawn new cards from the talon to replace those sloughed, no additional cards may be sloughed.

Variation: players may only slough cards of the same denomination as they themselves played. This may be done at any time after the player has played to the trick. A player who draws more cards of the same denomination that he has played or sloughed may also slough these cards and draw new ones from the talon, and so on if it happens again. If there is a counterplay, the players who re-play to the trick get to slough more cards of the denomination they are re-playing. However, they may not throw in any more cards of the denomination they played before.

Variation: Any player may slough cards at any time after the first play and before the trick has been turned over. The cards are placed at the top of the trick pile and do not affect who wins the trick. A player who sloughs cards must always draw an equal number of new cards from the talon. The cards may be thrown in even after you have started to settle for the victory in the trick after a counterplay, and it is allowed to throw in additional cards after you have already thrown in cards and drawn new cards from the talon. A player who sloughs cards directly before or after they play cards to the trick should of course clarify which cards are being played and which are being sloughed.

Optional rule: If two or more players play cards of the same denomination to the trick, those cards beat all cards of denominations played by only one player. A player thus makes a counterplay, even if the cards of the same rank are lower than the highest rank in the trick up to that point. If a counterplay is made in several denominations, the counterplay of the highest denomination beats the others. Players who tie for the lead in the trick resolve it in the usual way by playing again to the trick. Also when players play the second time to a trick, a counterplay beats all other cards and a higher-ranked counterplay beats a lower-ranked counterplay. When playing with this optional rule, it is also convenient to use the variantion above that the players may only slough cards of the denomination they themselves played.

Optional rule: A player who can make a counterplay must do so. If you play as usual – that is, without the optional rule above – this means that a player who has one or more cards of the highest rank in the trick up to that point must play one or more of these cards. If playing with the optional rule above, the following applies: a player who can play one or more cards of a rank that has already been played to the trick must do so, unless a counterplay of another, higher rank has already been made. In such a case, the player cannot tie the trick and may play any card. A player who can counterplay in several different denominations must counterplay in the highest one.

A player who doesn't like his cards may play the top card from the talon to the trick. This is called taking a chance or daring.

The winner of a trick leads to the next.

The player who draws the last card from the talon may neither look at this card nor play it to a trick, but leaves it face down next to self. Players continue to play from their hands, until any player whose turn it is to play a trick has no cards left. If at this point the last trick is not completed, all players take back the cards they played to that trick.

Variation: When a player has taken the bottom card from the talon, the current trick is completed if possible and phase 1 is then over. If the last trick cannot be completed, all players take back the cards they played to that trick.

=== Between phases ===
When phase 1 is over, the player who drew the last card from the talon turns the card over so it is visible. The suit of the card indicates trumps in phase 2.

Players pick up all the cards they have won in tricks and combine them with any cards left in the hand or taken back from the last trick. The player who drew the last card from the talon also picks up this card.

Optional rule: If at this point one or more players have fewer than 5 cards in their hand, these players may share all so-called rubbish cards, i.e. all those from the 2s to the 5s. If applicable, all the players – even those who will receive low cards – sort out all the 2s, 3s, 4sand 5s from their hands. Note that the low trumps must also be sorted out. The low cards are shuffled by one of the other players and dealt out one by one to the players concerned. This is a standard rule in the United States. Variation: The minimum number of cards required to avoid the low cards may also be six, seven or ten.

Variation: Players who have too few cards are dealt the low cards according to the optional rule above, but the minimum number of cards required to avoid this is specified by the face value of the trump upcard. Aces count in this context as 14, Kings as 13, Queens as 12 and Jacks 11.

=== Phase 2 ===
The player who drew the last card from the pack goes first in phase 2. A player who plays to a trick in this phase may play any card or sequence from his own hand. A sequence is an unbroken succession of cards of a suit, for example ♥9 ♥10 ♥J.

Play proceeds clockwise. A player playing to the trick must play a card or sequence of the same suit and of higher rank than the top card or play a card or sequence in trump. If the trump is at the top of the pile, of course the only option left is to overtrump. Leading a card or a sequence to a trick or playing a card or sequence to a trick is called making a 'lay' (läggning).

If a player is unable or unwilling to play cards to a trick, he must take the top card from the trick pile and all cards in sequence from this card. Note that this applies even if the sequence has been played in several lays. For example, if A plays the ♣3, B plays the ♣6 and ♣7, C plays the ♣8, ♣9 and ♣10 and D cannot overtake, then D must pick up the entire sequence from 6 to 10 (but not the three, as it does not sit in an unbroken sequence with the others). Picking up cards is usually called 'plucking' (plocka) or 'tanking up' (supa).

Variation: A player picking up must pick up the bottom sequence of the trick pile. This is the standard rule in the United States.

Variation: A player who picks up must not take the top (or bottom, if you play with that variant) sequence in the stack, but the top (bottom) lay. In the example above, D should only pick up ♣8, ♣9 and ♣10 (provided that it is the top lay to be picked up).

Variation: It is not allowed to play sequences. Players may only play one card at a time. When playing with this variant, a player who pick up must always only take the top (or bottom) card.

If someone picks up, the turn to play to the trick rotates clockwise. The player whose turn it is must, in the same way as before, either overtake the top card of the pile or draw a card. If this player also picks up, he or she must take the top card and all cards in sequence from that and the turn to play to the trick proceeds clockwise. If a player picks up the last card(s) in the trick pile, the next player in clockwise order leads to a new trick.

A trick is complete when there are cards from as many lays in the trick pile as there were active players left when the lead to the trick was made. Playing last to a trick and thus ending it is called completing a trick. For example, suppose four people still have cards left in their hand. A leads, B and C both overtake, and D chooses to pick up. Assume further that the cards from B and C form an unbroken sequence. D must then pick up both B's and C's cards, and only the cards from A's play remain in the trick pile. A is again on lead and must overtake the cards played before. If then B and C both overtake, there are cards from four lays in the trick: A's play, A's second play to the trick, and B's and C's second play to the trick. The trick is thus complete. The player completing the trick discards the cards from the trick pile face up into a separate pile and leads to the next trick. The discarded cards are no longer in the game.

A player who no longer has any cards left has gone out and is no longer at risk of becoming the skitgubbe. If a player goes out at the same time as he is completing a trick, the next lead is made by the next player in clockwise order. As soon as the second last player has disposed of their last card, the game is over, and the remaining player is the skitgubbe.

== Related games ==
Melniki: The Russian game of Melniki was played like Mas with a trump turnup, but with the difference that a player who could follow suit was not allowed to draw, but had to play a card. A player who could not follow a suit, but had a trump, however, could choose to draw or trump. The Mas rules that a player with three trumps may draw new cards and that the player with the two trumps may steal the turnup are not mentioned in the Russian source.
