= Vändtia =

Swedish card game

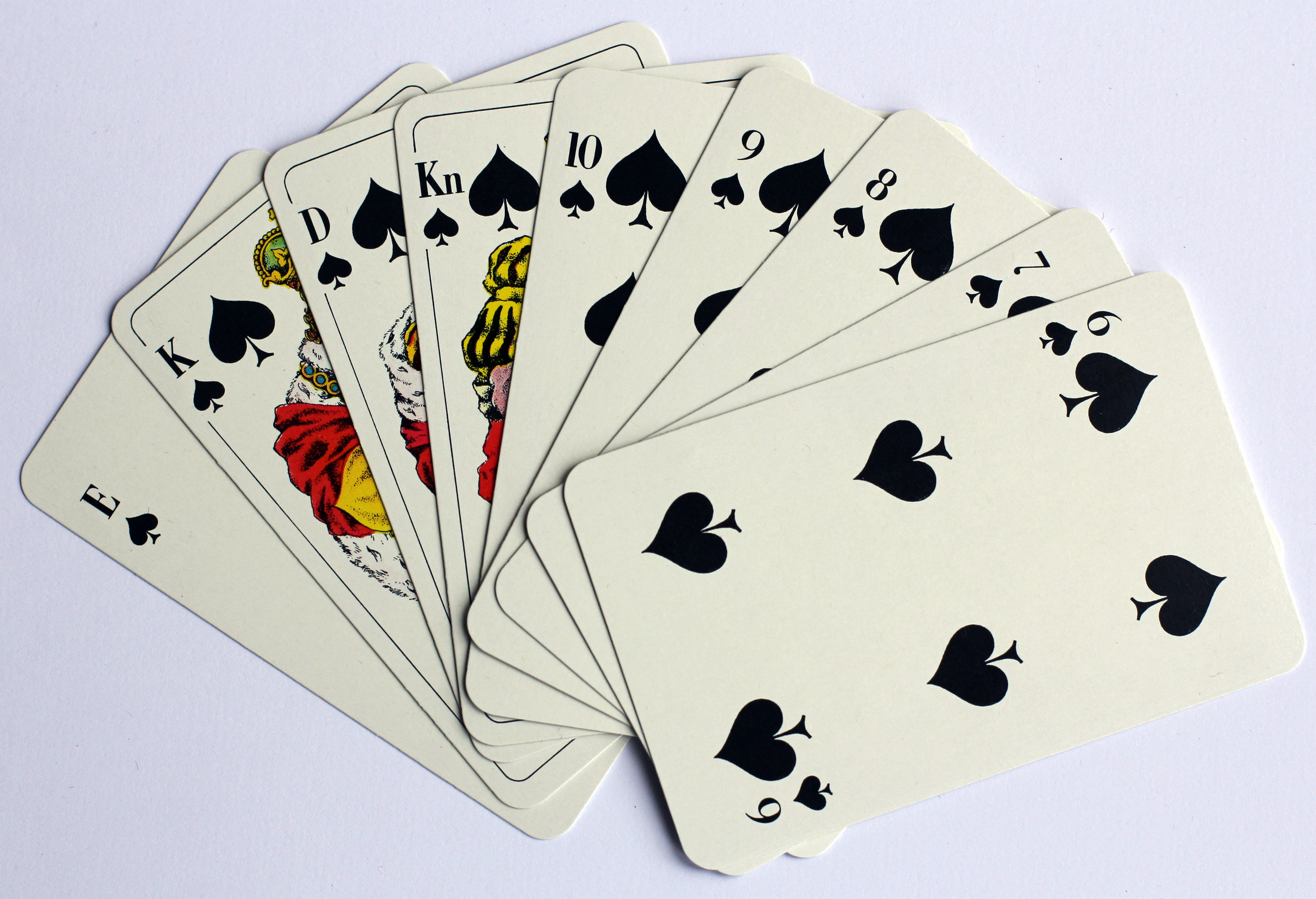
- Spades from a Modern Swedish pattern pack
- Origin: Sweden
- Alternative names: Spanish Skitgubbe
- Type: Shedding card games
- Players: 2–4
- Cards: 52 cards
- Deck: French-suited, Swedish Modern pattern
- Rank (high→low): A K Q J 9 8 7 6 5 4 3 Special cards: 2, 7, 10
- Playing time: 10 min/deal

Related games
- Shithead (card game)

Vändtia, also called Spanish Skitgubbe (Spansk Skitgubbe), is a classic Swedish card game of the shedding type for two to four players in which the last one left holding cards is the loser and may have to pay a forfeit. It is a popular in Sweden, being a game that is easy to learn and quick to play. Despite its alternative southern Swedish name, it is quite different from the classic Swedish three-hander known as Skitgubbe.

== History ==
The game probably emerged in the 1970s in North Sweden and, although it rarely appears in card game books, has been called a "classic card game" and a "favourite among Swedes", a game which is "easy to learn and quick to play". It is also known by the name Spanish Skitgubbe or simply Skitgubbe, especially in South Sweden, but should not be confused with the well known Swedish game of Skitgubbe to which it is unrelated. The game has spread internationally under a number of different names including Shed, China Hand, Palace, Karma, and Ten-Two Slide.

== Overview ==
Vändtia is a shedding game for two or more players in which each starts with 9 cards, the objective being to get rid of one's cards as quickly as possible. The last player left holding cards, loses.

== Cards and players ==
Vändtia is usually played by two to four players, but up to five may play with a single pack and 10 may play with a double pack provided the rules are adjusted. The game uses a 52-card pack which may be of the traditional Swedish Modern or international English pattern comprising 4 suits – Clubs, Spades, Hearts and Diamonds – each of 13 cards. The cards rank in their natural order, Aces high, with the exception of the 2s, 7s and 10s which have special roles.

== Deal ==
The first dealer is chosen at random and deals nine cards each in clockwise order. In the first round, the dealer deals three cards face down in a row in front of each player. Next, the dealer deals three cards each, face up, on top of the three downcards; and in the final round, the dealer gives each player three more as hand cards. The remaining cards are placed face down in the centre of the table, as the stock or draw pile.

== Rearranging ==
After the deal and before play begins, players may rearrange their own hand cards and upcards, exchanging one-for-one as they see fit. In addition, cards of the same rank may be stacked, face up, on a table pile and more drawn from stock to bring the hand up to three cards again. Having finished rearranging, players may also place cards on top of their opponents' upcards if they are of the same rank, again drawing from stock to get back up to three hand cards.

== Play ==
The player with the lowest card in hand (normally a 3) places it next to the stock to begin the discard pile. If two tie with lowest card, the one with the higher suit takes precedence; for this purpose only, suits rank in the descending order as follows: ♠ – ♥ – ♦ – ♣. Play then proceeds clockwise and each player, in turn, may play a card of the same or higher rank than that of the top card of the discard pile. A player unable or unwilling to play a card must draw a card from the draw pile; if still unable or unwilling to play a card to the discard pile, the discards must be picked up and added to the hand cards of that player. Having played to the discard pile or picked it up, the turn moves to the next player. A player's whose hand cards drop below three as a result of playing a card or cards, draws as many cards as needed to make the hand back up to three, subject to the number of cards left in the draw pile.

A player who has a set (i.e. more than one card of the same rank) may play any or all of them at once onto the discard pile provided they are of the same or higher rank than the current top card.

=== Special cards ===
Some cards have special privileges:

- Twos. A 2 may be played on any card and may be followed by any card.
- Tens. A 10 may be played on any card; the discard pile is removed from play, face down, and the same player may play any card or set to start a new discard pile.
- Sevens. Commonly, a 7 is considered 'glass' or 'transparent'. It may be played on any card and the following player has to play a card or set that could have been legally played immediately before the 7 was placed.

=== Quartets ===
A quartet is a set of four cards of equal rank, also called four-of-a-kind. If a quartet is played in sequence to the discard pile, it is treated in the same way as playing a 10. The player who plays the fourth card (whether singly or as part of a set), removes the discard pile from play and plays any card or set to start a new one.

== Endgame ==
When a player runs out of hand cards, if the draw pile has been used up, that player may play from the three upcards if possible. With no hand cards or upcards left, a player must select a downcard, turn it over and play it if possible. If at any stage a player is unable or unwilling to play a card to the discard pile and the stock has been used up, the player must pick up the discard pile and begin playing them as hand cards again. A player may not go out by playing a 2, 10 or Ace.

== Variations ==
=== Deal ===
- Sometimes players are dealt four downcards, four upcards and four hand cards each.

=== Rearranging ===
- Players may only rearrange their cards by exchanging one-for-one between their hand cards and their upcards.
- When rearranging cards at the beginning, players may play a matching card or set to an opponent's upcard with the exception of court cards.

=== Pick-up ===
If a player is unable or unwilling to play a card onto the discard pile:

- The discards must be picked up without drawing a fresh card from the draw pile.
- The player may draw one card from the draw pile, but if still unable to play, the discard pile must be picked up.
- The player may draw up to two cards from the draw pile, but if still unable to play, the discard pile must be picked up.

=== Special cards ===
- The player of a 2 plays is allowed another turn.
- The player of a 10 must start the new discard pile with a 10 or higher.
- The 7 has no special role.

=== Endgame ===
- When an upcard is played, the downcard beneath it is turned over. No cards are played 'blind'.
- Players may not go out with a 2 or 10, but may with an Ace.

== See also ==
- Ten-Two Slide
