= Karl Gottfried Konstantin Dehio =

Baltic German medical scientist (1851–1927)

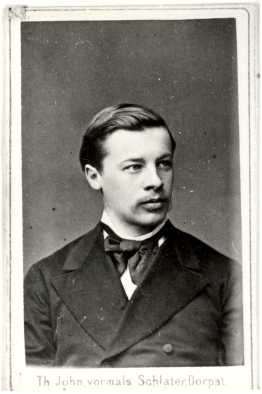
Karl Dehio (1851-1927)

Karl Gottfried Konstantin Dehio (27 May 1851, Reval – 26 February 1927) was a Baltic German internist and professor of pathology.

In 1877 he earned his doctorate from the Imperial University of Dorpat, and following graduation continued his studies at the University of Vienna. From 1879 to 1883 he was a physician at the Prince of Oldenburg Children's Hospital in St. Petersburg, returning to Dorpat in 1884 as a lecturer at the university. In 1886, he became a professor of pathology, being chosen university rector in 1918.

From 1890 to 1914 Dehio was editor of St. Petersburger Medizinischen Wochenschrift for Dorpat. He was the president of the Naturalists' Society at the University of Dorpat in 1899–1901, and for a period of time was vice-president of the society to combat leprosy in Livonia.

An atropine test known as "Dehio's test" is attributed to him, which states: "If an injection of atropine relieves bradycardia, the condition is due to action of the vagus; if it does not, the condition may be due to an affection of the heart itself".

One of Dehio's daughters was the writer Else Hueck-Dehio.

== See also ==
- List of Baltic German scientists

== Published works ==
- Beiträge zur pathologischen Anatomie der Lepra, (Contributions to the pathological anatomy of leprosy), (1877)
- Experimentelle Studien über das bronchiale Athmungsgeräusch und die auscultatorischen Cavernensymptome, 1885.
- In der Dorpater Poliklinik gebräuchliche Recepte und Verordnungen, (Common prescriptions and regulations at the Dorpat Polyclinic), (1885)
- Die Infectionskrankheiten und ihre Heilung (Infectious diseases and their cure), (1892)
- Die Lepra einst und jetzt, (Leprosy then and now), (1895)
- Pocken, Rückfallsfieber, Flecktyphus und Malaria (Smallpox, relapsing fever, typhoid and malaria), (1899)
- Vitalismus und Mechanismus (Vitalism and mechanism), (1926)

Preceded by Vissarion Alekseyev	Rector of University of Dorpat; 1918	Succeeded by Heinrich Koppel
