= Vissarion Alekseyev =

Russian mathematician (1866–1943)

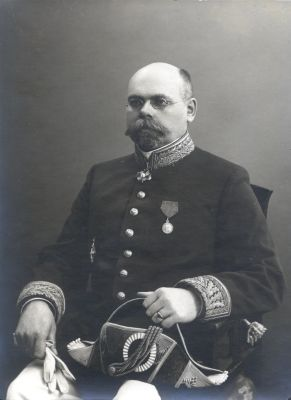
Vissarion Alekseyev

Vissarion Grigorievich Alekseyev (Russian: Виссарион Григорьевич Алексеев; 18 June 1866 – 1943) was a Russian mathematician. From 1909-1914 and 1917–1918 he was the rector of Tartu University.

He graduated from Moscow University. From 1891 he worked at the Imperial University of Dorpat.

In 1920 he moved permanently to Estonia.

He died in 1943 in Poland.

Preceded by Jevgeni Passek	Rector of the Imperial University of Dorpat; 1909–1914	Succeeded by Pjotr Pustoroslev

Preceded by Pjotr Pustoroslev	Rector of the Imperial University of Dorpat; 1917–1918	Succeeded by Karl Dehio
