= Cheat (game) =

Card game

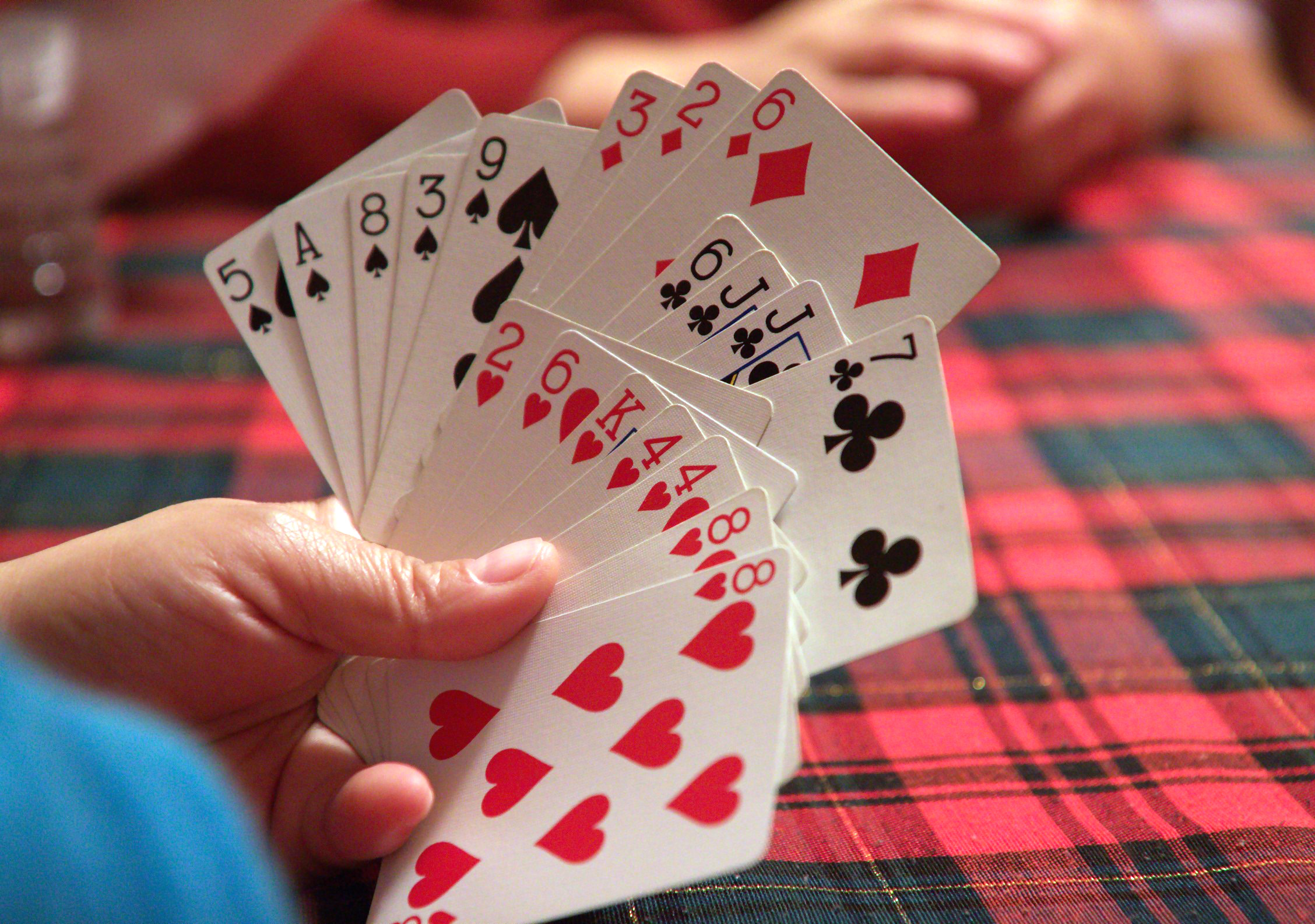
- Alternative names: Bullshit, I Doubt It
- Type: Shedding-type
- Players: 3–10
- Skills: Counting, number sequencing, deception
- Age range: 8+
- Cards: 52 (104)
- Deck: French
- Play: Clockwise
- Chance: Medium

Related games
- Valepaska • Verish' Ne Verish'
- Easy to play

Cheat (Britain), also known as Bullshit (United States) or I Doubt It, is a card game where the players aim to get rid of all of their cards. It is a game of deception, with cards being played face-down and players being permitted (and often required) to lie about the cards they have played. A challenge is usually made by players calling out the name of the game, and the loser of a challenge has to pick up every card played so far. Cheat is classed as a party game. As with many card games, cheat has an oral tradition and so people are taught the game under different names.

== Rules ==
One pack of 52 cards is used for four or fewer players; games with five or more players generally combine two 52-card packs. The cards are shuffled and dealt as evenly as possible among the players, with no cards left. Depending on the number of players, some may end up with one card more or less than the others. Players may look at their hands.

The player who sits to the dealer's left (clockwise) usually takes the first turn and calls aces. The second player does the same and calls twos. Play continues like this, increasing rank each time, with aces following kings. As players call the rank, they discard one or more cards face down, and declare the number of cards discarded. Players may lie by including cards that are not of the rank required for that turn.

If any player thinks another player is lying, they can call the player out by shouting "Cheat" (or "Bullshit", "I doubt it", etc.). This stops the play, revealing the cards in question to all players. If the accused player was lying, they must take the whole pile of cards into their hands. If that player was right about the cards they played, the caller must take the pile into their hand. However, once the next player has placed cards, it is too late to call out any previous players.

The game ends when one player runs out of cards, at which point that player wins.

== Variants ==
- A common British variant allows a player to pass their turn if they do not wish to lie or if all the cards of the required rank have clearly been previously played.
- Some variants allow a rank above or below the previous rank to be called. Others allow the current rank to be repeated or progress down through ranks instead of up.
- Some variants allow only a single card to be discarded during a turn.
- In some variations, a player may also lie about the number of cards they are playing, if they feel confident that other players will not notice the discrepancy. This is challenged and revealed in the usual manner.
- In some variations, all cards (not just the ones in question) are publicly revealed after a challenge, providing information about which players lied about their cards.
- In another variant, players must continue placing cards of the same rank until someone calls "Cheat" or everyone decides to pass a turn.
- In another variant, cards that are being played must all be of the same rank, even if the player is lying about the actual rank being played.

== International variants ==
The game is commonly known as "Cheat" in Britain and "Bullshit" in the United States.

=== Mogeln ===
The German and Austrian variant is for four or more players and is variously known as Mogeln ("cheat"), Schwindeln ("swindle"), Lügen ("lie") or Zweifeln ("doubting"). In Austrian Vorarlberg it is also Lüga. A 52-card pack is used (two packs with more players) and each player is dealt the same number of cards, any surplus being dealt face down to the table. The player who has the Ace of Hearts leads by placing it face down on the table (on the surplus cards if any). The player to the left follows and names their discard as the Two of Hearts and so on up to the King. Then the next suit is started. Any player may play a card other than the correct one in the sequence, but if their opponents suspect the player of cheating, they call gemogelt! ("cheated!"). The card is checked and if it is the wrong card, the offending player has to pick up the entire stack. If it is the right card, the challenger has to pick up the stack. The winner is the first to shed all their cards; the loser is the last one left holding any cards.

=== Veryu Ne Veryu ===
The Russian game Veryu Ne Veryu (Russian, Верю не Верю, literally "I believe, I don't believe") is typically played with 36 cards, and differs from Cheat in several respects. First, the rank does not change as play proceeds around the table: every player must call the same rank as chosen by the first player. Second, aside from the options of laying down additional cards or calling "ne veryu" ("I don't believe") to call a bluff, a player has the third option to call "veryu" ("I believe"). In this case, the last played cards are revealed, and either the entire round's stack is removed out of play if the last played cards were truly of the claimed rank, or the entire stack is taken by the current (calling) player if they were not. If the current player takes cards due to an incorrect call, their turn ends, but the addition of the "veryu" call means that a player always has a way to avoid losing their turn, even when the previous player is clearly telling the truth and the next player knows that the current player does not have the needed rank. Finally, the game differs from Cheat in that play typically continues after a player gets rid of their cards (and "leaves" the game, in most variants only after finishing the round) until only a sole loser is left.

Many variants of the game exists, including playing with more cards, not allowing aces to be called as their rank, and others. One version of the game also does not begin with the entire deck dealt out. Instead, each player is dealt a hand of five cards and draws up to five at the end of every round if they have fewer than five, and players are only able to leave the game once the draw deck is empty. If a round reaches a player at a point in which they have no cards in hand, they are forced to make a call.

=== Canadian/Spanish Bluff ===
Similar to Russian Bluff, it is a version used by at least some in Canada and known in Spain. The rules are rather strict and, while it is a variation, it is not open to much variation itself. It is also known in English as Fourshit (single deck) and Eightshit (double deck), the game involves a few important changes to the standard rules. Usually two decks are used instead of one so that there are 8 of every card as well as four jokers (Jokers are optional), though one deck may be used if desired. Not all ranks are used; the players can arbitrarily choose which ranks to use in the deck and, if using two decks, should use one card for each player plus two or three more. Four players may choose to use 6, 8, 10, J, Q, K, A or may just as easily choose 2, 4, 5, 6, 7, 9, J, K, or any other cards. This can be a useful way to make use of decks with missing cards as those ranks can be removed. The four jokers are considered wild and may represent any card in the game.

The first player can be chosen by any means. The Spanish variation calls for a bidding war to see who has the highest card. The winner of the challenge is the first player. In Canada, a version is the first player to be dealt a Jack face up, and then the cards are re-dealt face down.

The first player will make a "claim" of any rank of cards and an amount of their choice. In this version each player in turn must play as many cards as they wish of the same rank. The rank played never goes up, down nor changes in any way. If the first player plays kings, all subsequent players must also play kings for that round (it is non-incremental). Jokers represent the card of the rank being played in each round, and allow a legal claim of up to 11 of one card (seven naturals and four jokers). A player may play more cards than they claim to play though hiding cards under the table or up the sleeve is not allowed. After any challenge, the winner begins a new round by making a claim of any amount of any card rank.

If at any point a player picks up cards and has all eight natural cards of a certain rank, they declare this out loud and remove them from the game. If a player fails to do this and later leads a round with this rank, they automatically lose the game.

Once a player has played all their cards, they are out of that particular hand. Play continues until there are only two players (at which point some cards have probably been removed from the game). The players continue playing until there is a loser. The object of the game is usually not so much to win, but not be the loser. The loser is usually penalised by the winners either in having the dishonour of losing, or having to perform a forfeit.

=== Chinese Liar ===
In the Fujian province, a version of the game known as 吹牛 ("bragging") or 说谎 ("lying") is played with no restriction on the rank that may be called each turn, and simply requiring that each set is claimed to be of the same number. On any given turn, a player may "pass" instead of playing. If all players pass consecutively, then the face-down stack of played cards is taken out of the game until the next bluff is called. The player who previously called a rank then begins play again.

=== Sweden ===
In Sweden the game is known as bluffstopp, a composition of bluff ("bluff") and stoppspel ("shedding game"). Players are given seven (or six) cards at the start of the game, and the remainder make a pile. Players are restricted to follow suit, and play a higher rank, but are allowed to bluff. If a player is revealed to be bluffing, or a player fails to call or a bluff, the player draws three cards from the pile.

Additional rules and players to play more than one card in secret, and drop cards in their lap. But if this is discovered, the player must draw three or even six cards.
