= Paskahousu =

Finnish card game

- Valepaska, Pöytäpaska
- Origin: Finland
- Alternative names: Paska, Hönö
- Type: Shedding-type
- Players: 2–6
- Cards: 52
- Deck: Standard
- Rank (high→low): A K Q J 10 9 8 7 6 5 4 3 (2 is special)
- Play: Clockwise

Related games
- Cheat

Paskahousu (Finnish pronunciation: [ˈpɑskɑˌhou̯su]; "scaredy pants") is a popular Finnish card game for two to six players, but three to five are best. The object of the game is to play higher cards than the previously played cards, first to get replacement cards from the stock pile, and after the stock pile has exhausted, to get rid of one's cards.

The game has many rule variations, some of which are described. One of the most widespread variants is Valepaska, in which the cards are played face down, and players don't need to announce their plays truthfully.

== Rules ==
The following rules are based on those at pagat.com.

=== Deal ===
One deck of 52 cards is used, with cards ranking in descending order as follows: 2 A K Q J 10 9 8 7 6 5 4 3. Twos, Tens and Aces have special privileges. Each player is initially dealt five cards (2–2–1). The rest of the cards form a face-down stock.

=== Play ===
In turn each player, with or without drawing the top card from the stock, places one or more cards of the same rank from their hand onto a pile next to the stock according to the following rules:

- If the pile is empty, any card (or set of cards) may be played to start it.
- If the pile is not empty, the new cards must be of at least the same rank than the previous cards in the pile.
- Twos can be played on any card except an ace or ten. Only a two can be played on top of another two.
- Nothing can be played on a ten except another ten; likewise only an ace may be played on an ace.
- If the top card is lower than a seven, no court cards may be played.
- Aces can only be played onto a court card or another ace.

A player who cannot or does not want to play, must take the entire pile in hand and the turn rotates left.

A player who, after playing, has fewer than five cards in hand, must draw cards from the top of the stock to bring the hand up to five cards. Obviously this is only possible if the stock is not exhausted.

A player who gets rid of all their cards after the stock has been exhausted is out and does not participate in the game any more. The first player to go out is the winner. The loser is the player who has cards left when everyone else has gone out. In some circles the loser is called paskahousu.

== Variants ==
=== Valepaska ===
In Valepaska, also called Valepaskahousu and Kusetuspaskahousu and often considered standard Paskahousu in English literature, the cards are played face down, and players announce the cards that they play (for example "one jack" or "three eights"). Players are allowed to lie, and plays may be challenged by any other player. In a challenge, the played cards are exposed: if the play was honest, the challenger must pick the pile up (and the challenged player starts the new pile); if the play was deceitful, the challenged player takes the pile (and play passes to the next player). Only the immediately preceding play may be challenged.

According to Finnish website Korttipelit (card games), there are no standard rules for which player continues play following a challenge. The website recommends that an exposed liar never start the new pile.

=== Pöytäpaska ===
Pöytäpaska (Table Paskahousu) also known as Espanjalainen paskahousu (Spanish Paskahousu) In addition to their regular hands, each of the 2–3 players is dealt four face-down cards and four face-up cards. These cards are played after the stock and the cards in the player's hand have been exhausted. The face-up cards are played first. The player can then attempt to play the face-down cards without looking at their rank. If the play is not in accordance with the rules, the player must pick up the entire pile into their hand. These cards in hand must be played before the player can attempt to play another face-down card.

To avoid deadlocks and lengthy games, some rules may be relaxed after the stock is depleted, such as:

- rules restricting the play of court cards
- rule that the ace does not clear the play pile
- rule restricting the play of the ten
- rule restricting the play of other cards on a two

=== Ruotsalainen paskahousu ===
In Ruotsalainen paskahousu (Swedish Paskahousu) all the cards are dealt, and there is no stock. The game proceeds like the ordinary Paskahousu.

=== Miscellaneous rule variations ===
These rules can be used with the basic game or with any of the variants mentioned above.

==== Four same cards fall piles ====
- Four twos do not cause the pile to fall. (This rule is recommended in particular for Valepaska.)
- Four same cards do not cause the pile to fall. Only aces and tens fall piles.

==== Face cards ====
- Face cards can be only played on the top of eights and higher.
- Face cards can be played on the empty table and on the top of all smaller cards (except for twos.) Aces can be played on the top of the face cards.
- Face cards can be played on the empty table and on the top of all smaller cards (except for twos) after the stock has exhausted.
- Face cards can be played on the empty table and on the top of eights and higher.
- One is allowed to play only one face card per turn.

==== Aces and tens on an empty table ====
- A player is allowed to play an ace on an empty pile, but then the next player must take it and the same player plays again.
- A player is allowed to play an ace on an empty pile, but then the next player must take it, and the turn passes to the left.
- Both tens and aces work like aces in the previous point.

==== Lack of playable card ====
- If a player does not have a suitable card to play, they are allowed to attempt to play the top card from the stock. If this play is not in accordance with the rules, the player must take up the entire pile (including the card they attempted to play) into their hand.

== See also ==
- Cheat
- Shithead

== Bibliography ==
- Ranta, Pekka, Marjapussissa Porvooseen, WSOY 1993.
- Parlett, David, A-Z of Card Games, Oxford University Press, 2004.
- McLeod, John, ed., Paskahousu, Card Games Website.
- www.korttipelit.net The rules of Paskahousu (in Finnish).
