= Karl Friedrich Wilhelm Wander =

German proverb scholar (1803–1879)

Karl Friedrich Wilhelm Wander (27 December 1803 – 4 June 1879) was a German pedagogue and Germanist. He published the largest existing collection of German-language proverbs.

== Life ==
Wander was born on 27 December 1803 in Fischbach near Hirschberg in Silesia, as the eldest son of the village tailor of Fischbach. From 1810 he attended the local school there. In 1818 he started a carpentry apprenticeship in Warmbrunn, which he dropped after half a year in order to take up his desired profession to become a teacher. He was first trained by the village pastor, then from 1822 to 1824 at the Bunzlau teacher's seminary. He later became an auxiliary teacher in Gießmannsdorf and, in 1827, he moved to the Evangelical Municipal School in Hirschberg. There he practised Pestalozzi's educational approach in his mother tongue. In addition, he advocated teacher emancipation. His liberal attitude, sometimes referred to as communist, often led to quarrels with his superiors. This led in 1845 to a house search and his removal from office. In 1847, he was reinstated after being acquitted. However, after the March Revolution of 1848 he finally had to give up teaching in 1849. He was sacked as "instigator and seducer of riots and rebellion". He emigrated to the United States in 1850, but returned to Germany the following year.

In 1852 he became independent, running a spice shop in Hermsdorf. In 1874, he moved to Quirl, a village between Hirschberg and Schmiedeberg, where he died on 4 June 1879. In the GDR, he was considered a pathfinder from liberalism to socialism. The Pädagogische Hochschule in Dresden and high schools in Magdeburg and Leipzig bear his name.

His linguistic life's work was the proverb research. As a teacher he had already started collecting proverbs and used them for teaching purposes. He published various collections of proverbs, initially for children. From 1862 onwards his Deutsches Sprichwörter-Lexikon was created which, with over 250,000 entries, is the largest collection of proverbs to date (according to Killy Literaturlexikon). For numerous German proverbs, Wander gives their equivalents in many foreign languages.

== Works ==
=== Educational works ===
- Der Satz in seiner Allseitigkeit. Selbstverlag, Hirschberg 1829
- Vollständige Übungsschule der deutschen Rechtschreibung. Heymann, Glogau 1831
- Leseschule. Hirschberg 1833 (under the Pseudonym Willmann Rorig)
- Geschichtsblikke. 6 parts (January to June), Hennings, Neisse 1835–1838
- Der deutschen Sprache Lustgarten. Heymann, Berlin 1839
- Schlesische Schulpräparanden-Bildung. Nesener, Hirschberg, 1840
- Vollständiger Aufgabenschatz für Sprachschüler in Volksschulen oder Aufgaben für alle Zweige des Unterrichts in der Muttersprache. 6 parts, Heymann, Berlin 1841–1843
- Die Volksschule als Staatsanstalt. Wigand, Leipzig 1842
- Der geschmähete Diesterweg. Wigand, Leipzig 1843
- Theologischer, das ist unumstößlicher Beweis, daß die Schule die Dienstmagd der Kirche. Wigand, Leipzig 1844
- Erster Führer durch den deutschen Dichterhain. Korn, Breslau 1845
- Pädagogische Briefe vom Rhein. Verlag von Heinrich Hoff, Mannheim 1845 (unter dem Pseudonym B. G. Wuntschli)
- Bibliothek der neuesten Land- und Seereisen für die Jugend bearbeitet. Lucas, Hirschberg 1845
- Die poetische Kinderwelt. Verlags-Comptoir, Grimma 1845
- Sprachbuch für Stadt- und Landschulen. Hirschberg 1846
- Offenes Sendschreiben an Seine Excellenz, den Königl. Preuß. Minister der Geistlichen-, Unterrichts- und Medicinal-Angelegenheiten, Herrn Dr. Eichhorn. Wigand, Leipzig 1846
- Briefe von der Elbe über pädagogisch-politisch-religiöse Tagesfragen. Wigand, Leipzig 1846 (under the pseudonym Arnold Salzmann)
- Zeittafel für den Geschichtsunterricht. Hirschberg 1847
- Fünf Jahre aus dem Leben eines deutschen Volksschullehrers. Verlags-Comptoirs, Grimma 1848
- Die alte Volksschule und die neue. Trewendt, Breslau 1848
- Deutscher Schul-, Haus- und Kinderfreund. Verlags-Comptoir, Grimma [1848]
- Pädagogischer Wächter. Hirschberg und Bunzlau 1849–1852 (Zeitschrift, 4 Ausgaben)
- Ernst Will oder das Leben in der Gemeinde Strebmannsdorf, Verlagshandlung des Allgemeinen Deutschen Volksschriften-Vereins. Berlin 1848
- Taschenkatechismus für das Volk. Hirschberg 1849; 2. Auflage, Rosenthal, Hirschberg 1850
- Briefe von der Oder über pädagogische, religiöse und politische Zustände. Kollmann, Leipzig 1850 (under the pseudonym Ernst Pfeffer)
- Auswanderungs-Katechismus. Flemming, Glogau 1852 (Neudruck Lang, Bern [u. a.] 1988, ISBN 3-261-03799-7)
- Die Niederlassung des Lehrer Wander in Löwenberg. Würger, Hamburg 1855
- Eine Petition für eine bessere Landgemeindeverfassung. Franz Duncker, Berlin 1860
- Der Mordversuch gegen den Lehrer Wander vor den Geschwornen zu Jauer. Neustadt 1861
- Drei Jahre aus meinem Leben. Verlag der Genossenschafts-Buchdruckerei, Leipzig, 1878
- Gerd Hohendorf (ed.): Der Kampf um die Schule. Bildungspolitische und pädagogische Schriften. 2 Bände, Volk und Wissen, Berlin 1979
- Ludwig Barth und Werner Jokubeit (ed.); Peter Beirich (illustrations): … erglüht für seinen herrlichen Beruf. Aus den Schriften des Pädagogen Karl Friedrich Wilhelm Wander. Deutscher Verlag der Wissenschaften, Berlin, 1989, ISBN 3-326-00410-9

=== Proverb collections ===
- Scheidemünze. J. S. Landolt, Hirschberg 1831
- Weihnachtsnüsse. Nesener in Komm., Hirschberg 1832
- Nüsse für Kinder aufs ganze Jahr. Zimmer, Hirschberg 1835
- Allgemeiner Sprichwörterschatz. Zimmer, Hirschberg 1836 (Nachdruck unter dem Titel Das Sprichwort, Lang, Bern 1983, ISBN 3-261-03249-9)
- Der Sprichwörtergarten. Kohn, Breslau 1838
- Abrahamisches Parömiakon oder Die Sprichwörter des Abraham a Sancta Clara. Kohn, Breslau 1838
- Deutsches Sprichwörter-Lexikon. 5 vols., Brockhaus, Leipzig 1867–1880 (reprints by Scientia-Verl, Aalen 1963; Wissenschaftliche Buchgesellschaft, Darmstadt 1970, ISBN 3-534-01401-4; Akademische Verlagsgesellschaft Athenaion, Kettwig 1987. Also appears as a CD-ROM and on DVD in the Jubiläumsband Sprache der Digitalen Bibliothek, 2007: ISBN 978-3-89853-257-0)
- Politisches Sprichwörterbrevier. Wigand, Leipzig 1872 (reprint Lang, Bern [u. a.] 1990, ISBN 3-261-04232-X)

== Literature ==
=== Monographs ===
- Otto Ruysch (pseudonym für Otto Kemmer): Der „rote Wander“. Vökner, Hamburg 1892
- Hugo Wander (ed.): Karl Friedrich Wilhelm Wander. Ein deutscher Schul- und Volksmann des 19. Jahrhunderts. Selbstverlag, Quirl 1903
- Rudolf Hoffmann: Der „Rote Wander“. Ein Bild aus den trübsten Tagen der deutschen Volksschule und ihrer Lehrer. Zum 125. Geburtstage und 50. Todestage K. F. W. Wanders. Beltz, Langensalza 1929; Neubearbeitung von Friedrich Heilmann: Werden und Wirken, Weimar 1948
- Rudolf Hoffmann: Karl Friedrich Wilhelm Wander. Eine Studie über den Zusammenhang von Politik und Pädagogik im 19. Jahrhundert. Beltz, Langensalza 1929; zugleich: Philosophische Dissertation, Erlangen 1929
- Fritz Thiele: Der „rote“ Wander und seine Zeit. Erinnerungsblätter zum 150. Geburtstag Friedrich Wilhelm Wanders (geb. 27.12.1803, gest. 4.6.1879). Arbeitsgemeinschaft Deutscher Lehrerverbände, Darmstadt 1953
- Ernst Eichler (Leiter): Karl Friedrich Wilhelm Wander 1803–1879. Volk und Wissen, Berlin 1954
- Annelies Herzog: Karl Friedrich Wilhelm Wander als Sammler und Bearbeiter des deutschen Sprichwortschatzes. Dissertation, Technische Hochschule Dresden, 29. April 1957
- Franz Hofmann: Karl Friedrich Wilhelm Wander. Volk und Wissen, Berlin 1961
- Heinz Kurze: Der politische und schulpolitische Kampf K. F. W. Wanders in der bürgerlich-demokratischen Revolution 1848/49. Volk und Wissen, Berlin 1982; unter dem Titel Der politische und schulpolitische Kampf Karl Friedrich Wilhelm Wanders in der bürgerlich-demokratischen Revolution von 1848. Dissertation, Pädagogische Hochschule Potsdam, 21. Oktober 1965
- Gerd Hohendorf (Leiter): Karl Friedrich Wilhelm Wander (1803–1879). Pädagogische Hochschule, Dresden 1978 (Auswahlbibliographie)
- Karl Friedrich Wilhelm Wander und die bildungspolitisch-pädagogischen Bewegungen in der Mitte des 19. Jahrhunderts. Protokoll der Wander-Ehrung 1979. [ohne Verlag], Dresden 1979
- Oskar Geppert: Der freisinnige Schulmann Karl Friedrich Wilhelm Wander. Dissertation, Universität Gießen, 1988
- Diethelm Krause-Hotopp: Der junge Wander. Ein Beitrag zur Geschichte des niederen Schulwesens in Preußen während der Restauration (= Braunschweiger Arbeiten zur Schulpädagogik, Band 5). Technische Universität Braunschweig, 1989; zugleich: Dissertation, Technische Universität Braunschweig, 1989 (mit ausführlichem Werk- und Literaturverzeichnis)
- Jürgen Schäfer: Karl Friedrich Wilhelm Wanders Sprachbücher (= Beiträge zur Geschichte des Deutschunterrichts, Band 40). Lang, Frankfurt am Main [u. a.] 1999, ISBN 3-631-31675-5

=== Other literature ===
- Karl Gabriel Nowack: Schlesisches Schriftstellerlexikon. Heft 6, Korn, Breslau 1843
- Johann B. Heindl: Galerie berühmter Pädagogen. Band 2, Finsterlin, München 1859
- Ludwig Julius Fränkel (1896). "Wander, Friedrich Wilhelm" . Allgemeine Deutsche Biographie (in German). Vol. 41. Leipzig: Duncker & Humblot. pp. 139–143.
- D. Oppermann: Karl Friedrich Wilhelm Wander. In: Günther Wolgast und Joachim H. Knoll: Biographisches Handwörterbuch der Erwachsenenbildung. Burg-Verlag, Stuttgart and Bonn 1986, ISBN 3-922801-84-6
- Wolfgang Mieder: Wander, Karl Friedrich Wilhelm. In: Walther Killy (ed.): Literaturlexikon. Bertelsmann-Lexikon-Verlag, Gütersloh und München 1988–1992, Band 12, ISBN 3-570-04682-6
