= Hermann Frischbier =

German writer (1823–1891)

Hermann Frischbier (1823 – 1891) was a German schoolteacher as well as an author of works about East Prussian local history and culture.

== Life ==
Frischbier was born on 10 January 1823 in Königsberg i. Pr. After passing the examination at the teachers' seminar in 1842, Frischbier became a teacher in Guttstadt and Heilsberg and, from 1853, in Königsberg. From 1872 to 1889 he was headmaster of the Altstadt girls' school.

Growing up in the house of a bricklayer where they spoke Low German, he was familiar with the language, customs and practices of East Prussia. His articles appeared in the Altpreußischen Monatsschrift ("Old Prussian Monthly"), the Zeitschrift für deutsche Philologie ("Journal for German Philology"), in Die deutschen Mundarten ("The German Dialects"), the Korrespondenzblatt des Vereins für niederdeutsche Sprachforschung ("Magazine of the Association for Low German Language Research"), the Wissenschaftlichen Monatsblättern ("Scientific Monthly") and the folklore journals, Am Urdsbrunnen and Am Urquell. Along with many other colleagues, Frischbier significantly promoted Prussian folklore.

Through [Frischbier's works], the treasure of the Old Prussians in proverbs, rhymes and provincialisms is exhaustively covered.

— Jan Karol Sembrzycki

The Masurian, Jan Karol Sembrzycki, made famous Frischbier's contribution to Polish folklore - even "the times of the most ferocious Polish oppression" - although Frischbier had barely mastered the Polish language himself.

Frischbier died in Königsberg on 8 December 1891.

== Honours ==
- Prussian Order of the Crown
- Frischbier Way (Frischbierweg), a road that crosses the Juditter Allee in Königsberg

== Works ==
- Preußische Sprichwörter und volkstümliche Redensarten. 2 vols. Königsberg 1864/76 (Digitalisat; Digitalisat).
- Preußische Volksreime und Volksspiele. Königsberg 1867 (urn:nbn:de:bvb:12-bsb10108320-0).
- Hexenspruch und Zauberbann. Ein Beitrag zur Geschichte des Aberglaubens in der Provinz Preußen. Königsberg 1870 (Digitalisat).
- Preußische Volkslieder in plattdeutscher Mundart. Königsberg 1877
- Preußisches Wörterbuch, 2 Bde. Königsberg 1882/83 (Digitalisat; Digitalisat).
- Hundert ostpreußische Volkslieder in hochdeutscher Sprache. Königsberg 1893

== Literature ==
- Ludwig Julius Fränkel (1904). "Frischbier, Hermann" . Allgemeine Deutsche Biographie (in German). Vol. 49. Leipzig: Duncker & Humblot. pp. 151–152.
