= Else Hueck-Dehio =

German author (1897–1976)

- Born: 1897
- Died: 1976 (aged 78–79)
- Occupation: Author
- Citizenship: Unknown
- Years active: 1950s onwards

Else Hueck-Dehio (1897–1976) was a German author from the Baltic region of the Russian Empire who wrote stories about Estonia.

== Life ==
Dehio was born on 30 December 1897 in Dorpat, Livonia in the Russian Empire.

Else Dehio was the daughter of a Baltic German doctor, Karl Dehio. She initially qualified as a nurse, but then fled from her Baltic homeland to Berlin ahead of the Russian Revolution in 1918. During the rest of her life she lived in Berlin, Lüdenscheid and, from 1955, in Murnau in Upper Bavaria. From 1934 she wrote numerous stories, books for young people and novels, often with topics from her Baltic homeland. Her children's book Indian Summer (Indianersommer) was on the shortlist for German Youth Book Prize in 1966. In 1920 she married the manufacturer and later CDU politician, Richard Hueck (1893-1968), who was Mayor of Lüdenscheid in 1946.

Hueck-Dehio died on 30 June 1976 in Murnau.

== Works ==
- Die Frau und die geistige Schöpferkraft. Essays. 1933.
- Die Hochzeit auf Sandnes. Roman. Verlag Neue Nation, Berlin 1934, new editions published by Eher-Verlag to 1944.
- Die Schwelle. Novelle. 1938.
- Der Kampf um Torge. Roman. Eher, Munich 1938. new editions to 1943.
- Hueck-Dehio, Else (2001). Tipsys sonderliche Liebesgeschichte : eine Idylle aus dem alten Estland. Ja, damals ... Zwei heitere estländische Geschichten (Ungekürzte Ausg ed.). München: Dt. Taschenbuch-Verl. ISBN 3-423-25178-6. OCLC 645550045.
- Hueck-Dehio, Else (1980). Die Brunnenstube : ein Gedenkblatt. Heilbronn: E. Salzer-Verlag. ISBN 3-7936-0426-8. OCLC 10669547.
- Hueck-Dehio, Else (2003). Liebe Renata Geschichte einer Jugend (Ungekürzte Lizenzausg ed.). Gießen. ISBN 978-3-7655-3751-6. OCLC 76516694.
- Hueck-Dehio, Else (1988). Er aber zog seine Strasse Geschichte e. Wandlung (71. - 73. Tsd ed.). Heilbronn. ISBN 978-3-7936-0114-2. OCLC 74978078.
- Hueck-Dehio, Else (2003). Tipsy's sonderliche Liebesgeschichte; Taft zum Kragen; Baltische Erzählungen. Else Hueck-Dehio (1., veränd. Aufl ed.). Lahr: Kaufmann. ISBN 3-7806-5003-7. OCLC 76728784.
- Nikolaus-Legende. Lucas Cranach, Munich 1960. New edn. 1961.
- Hueck-Dehio, Else (1984). Die Magd im Vorhof : Erzählung. Neuhausen-Stuttgart: Hänssler. ISBN 3-7751-0887-4. OCLC 66286526.
- Indianersommer. Salzer, Heilbronn 1965. New edn. 1966.
- Die goldenen Äpfel. Claudius-Verlag, Munich, 1969.

== Literature ==
- Gottzmann, Carola L. (2007). Lexikon der deutschsprachigen Literatur des Baltikums und St. Petersburgs : vom Mittelalter bis zur Gegenwart. Petra Hörner. Berlin. pp. 614–616. ISBN 978-3-11-091213-5. OCLC 861527503.
- Silke Pasewalck: Raumdarstellung und Raumsemantik in Else Hueck-Dehio's novel "Liebe Renata". In: Triangulum. Germanistisches Jahrbuch für Estland, Lettland und Litauen, Band 19 (2013), S. 137–152.
- Interkulturalität und (literarisches) Übersetzen. Silke Pasewalck, Dieter Neidlinger, Terje Loogus. Tübingen. 2014. pp. 171–193. ISBN 978-3-86057-097-5. OCLC 894960346.
- Adam, Christian (2016). Der Traum vom Jahre Null Autoren, Bestseller, Leser: die Neuordnung der Bücherwelt in Ost und West nach 1945. Galiani Berlin (1. Auflage ed.). Berlin. pp. 284–287. ISBN 978-3-86971-122-5. OCLC 930641824.
