= Shithead (card game) =

Shedding-type card game

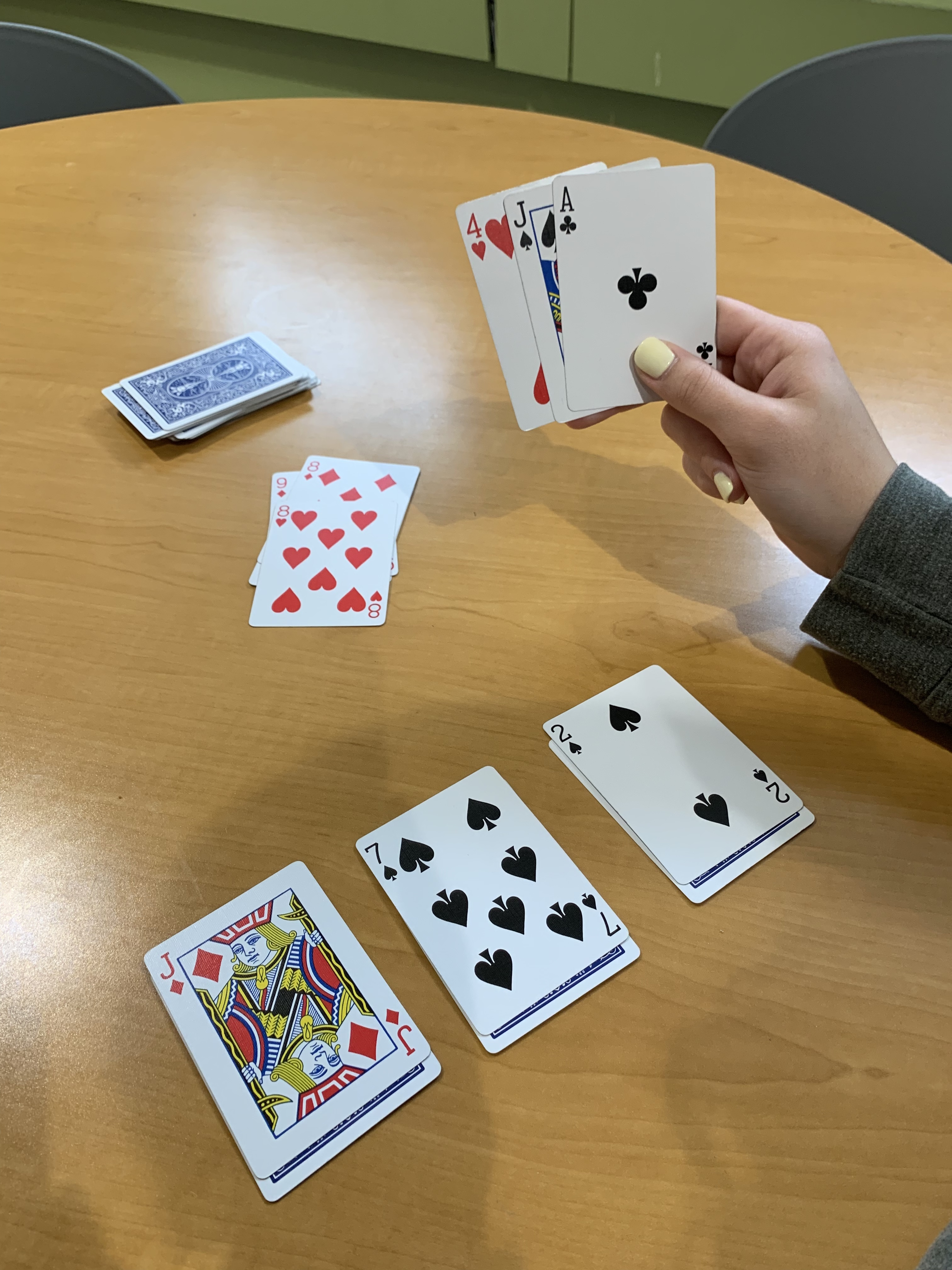
- Game under way
- Alternative names: Karma, Palace, Caboodle, Shed
- Type: Shedding-type
- Players: 2–5 (3–5 best)
- Skills: Memory, quickness
- Cards: 52 or more
- Deck: French
- Rank (high→low): Highly variable
- Play: Variable
- Playing time: 5 mins.+
- Chance: High

Related games
- Vändtia

Shithead (also called Karma, Palace, Caboodle or Shed) is a card game, the object of which is to lose all of one's playing cards and instead of having a winner the aim is not be the last one left in the game.

The game became popular among backpackers in the late 20th century. Game researcher John McLeod suggests that the game may be of Scandinavian or Nordic origin, as it is similar to both the Swedish game Vändtia ("turn ten") and the Finnish Paskahousu ("shit pants"). There are many regional variations to the game's original rules.

== Cards ==
A standard 52-card pack with French suit symbols is used. Aces are high.

== Deal ==
From a shuffled deck of cards, the dealer gives each player nine cards: three downcards in a row, three upcards on top of the downcards, and three hand cards. The upcards can only be played once the hand cards have been exhausted, and the downcards can only be played once the upcards have been played.

== Rearranging ==
After the deal and before play begins, players may switch their hand cards with those face up on the table in order to produce a strong set of upcards (ideally high cards, 2s or 10s) for later in the game.

== Play ==
Eldest hand is the first player dealt a 3 as an upcard. If no player has 3 face up, then the first player to declare a 3 in hand starts. If no-one has a 3, then the game is started by the person dealt a 4, etc. Eldest leads off by playing a card or set of cards face up in the middle of the table to start a common wastepile.

In turn and in clockwise order, players play a card or set that is equal to or higher in rank than the top card of the wastepile. If unable or unwilling to do so, they must pick up the wastepile and add it to their hand cards.

Each player must have at least three cards in hand at all times; a player who has fewer than three after playing to the wastepile draws cards from the stock, if possible, to make the hand up to three again.

=== Special cards and quartets ===
Deuces (2s), tens and four-of-a-kind quartets have special roles:

- Deuces. A deuce may be played on any card and any card may follow a deuce.
- Tens. A ten may be played on any turn, regardless of the top card on the wastepile or even if there is no wastepile card. When a ten is played, the wastepile is removed from play and set aside for the remainder of the game. The same player then plays any card or set to begin a new wastepile.
- Quartets. A quartet is a set of four cards of equal rank e.g. 5♦ 5♣ 5♥ 5♠ or 8♥ 8♦ 8♠ 8♣. If a player is able to play a quartet, the wastepile is set aside as if a ten had been played. In addition, the last player to complete a quartet on the top of the wastepile by playing its fourth card also removes the wastepile. Either way, the same player may then play another card or set.

=== Endgame ===
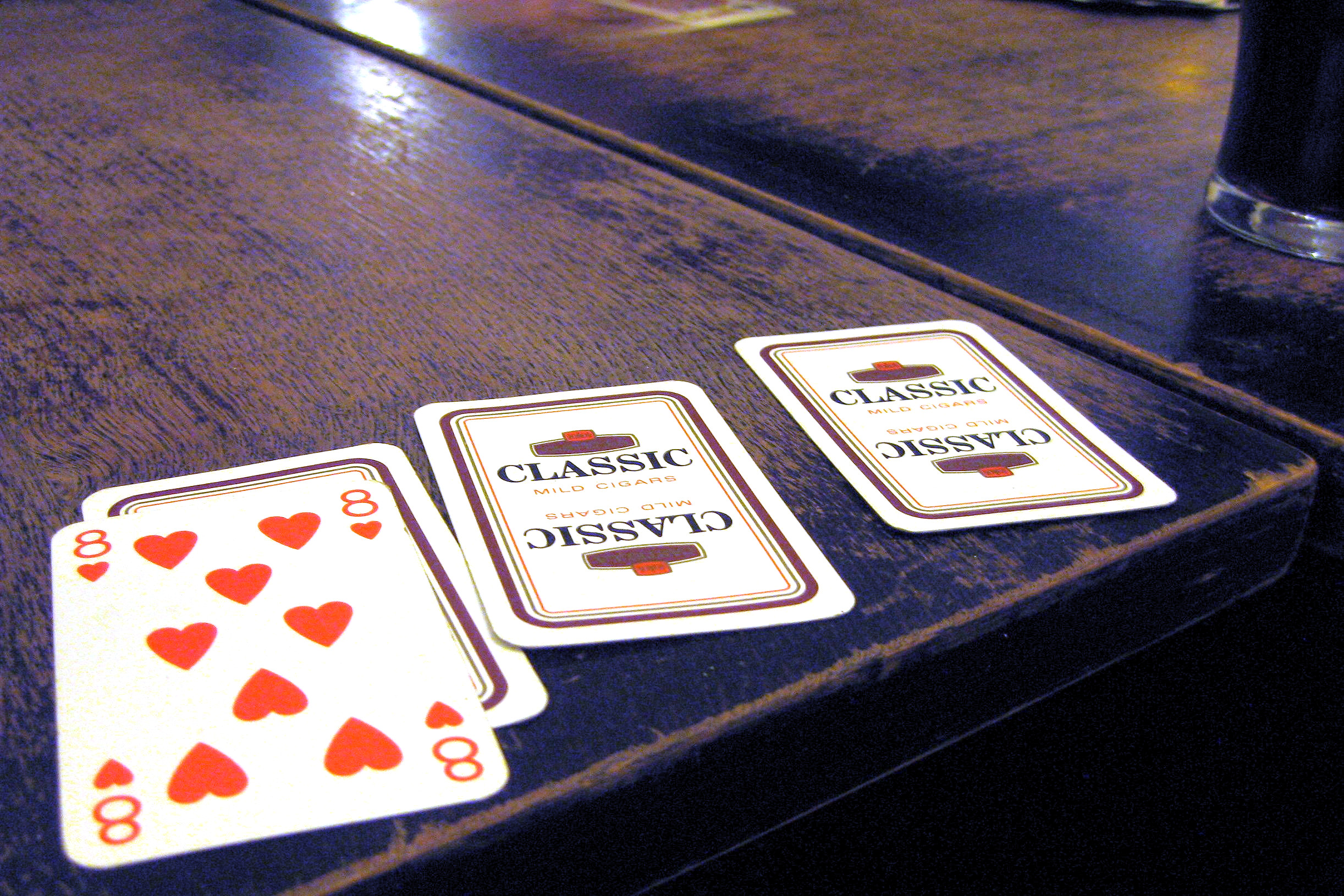
The game in its final phase, with two face-up cards played

A player who has no more cards in hand when the stock is empty must play from their upcards. If unable or unwilling to play an upcard, the player must pick up the wastepile. Once all of the upcards have been played, a player must then play downcards. These are played unseen one at a time and if the chosen card is lower than the previous card played, the wastepile must be picked up and, on subsequent turns, the player must play their hand cards before playing any more downcards. (Note: This is the main difference from Vändtia where a downcard is turned face up when the upcard above it is played.)

A player who has no cards left drops out. The last player left with cards is the loser and deals in the next game, but players may agree other forfeits, such as getting the next round of drinks.

== Variations ==
The following variations are recorded:

- Jokers – Two Jokers are added as special cards that reverse the direction of play and allow up to six players to participate.
- Stacking - When rearranging cards before play begins, players may stack cards of the same rank on top of each other on the upcard piles and replenish the hand from stock; this may be done more than once if more cards can be stacked.
- Tens Restricted - Tens may not be played on face cards; a player who plays a 10 may take another turn immediately.
- Lower Than – When a 7 is played, the next play must be lower than 7, except that a 10 may still be played.
- Transparency – In one variant, 8s are considered "transparent" and players instead play based on the card below them. In other variants, this role is assigned to the 3 instead.
- Additional Special Cards - Other card values can be given special attributes, such as reversing the order of play (cards such as nines and jacks are most common for fulfilling this role), skipping a player's turn, or requiring the next card to be lower than the played card.
