= List of Latvian women artists =

This is a list of women artists who were born in Latvia or whose artworks are closely associated with that country.

== A ==
- Aina Apse (1926–2015), potter
- Lidija Auza (1914–1989), painter and decorator

== B ==
- Aleksandra Belcova (1892–1981), painter
- Biruta Baumane (1922–2017), painter

== C ==
- Inta Celmiņa (born 1946), painter

== D ==
- Daina Dagnija (1937–2019), painter and textile artist
- Lea Davidova-Medene (1921–1986), sculptor
- Biruta Delle (born 1944), painter
- Lilija Dinere (born 1955), painter, illustrator
- Inta Dobrāja (1940–2020), painter
- Maija Dragūne (born 1945), graphic artist
- Līze Dzeguze (1908–1992), sculptor

== E ==
- Līvija Endzelīna (1927–2008), painter

== G ==
- Emīlija Gruzīte (1873–1945), painter

== K ==
- Ingrīda Kadaka (born 1967), book designer, illustrator
- Aina Karlsone (1935–2012), artist, writer
- Frančeska Kirke (born 1953), painter

== L ==
- Otīlija Leščinska (1884–1923), painter

== N ==
- Katrīna Neiburga (born 1978), video artist

== O ==
- Simona Orinska (born 1978), contemporary artist

== P ==
- Felicita Pauļuka (1925-2014), painter
- Tatyana Palchuk (born 1954), painter
- Lucia Peka (1912–1991), Latvian-American painter
- Līga Purmale (born 1948), painter

== S ==
- Džemma Skulme (1925–2019), painter
- Marta Skulme (1890–1962), sculptor
- Roze Stiebra (1942–2024), animator

== U ==
- Ēvī Upeniece (1925–2024), sculptor
