= Biruta Baumane =

Latvian painter (1922–2017)

- Born: Biruta Frīdberga; 6 June 1922; Tērvete parish, Latvia
- Died: 21 January 2017 (aged 94)
- Known for: Painting
- Movement: Modernism, Post-Impressionism, Fauvism
- Spouse: Kārlis Baumanis
- Patrons: Romans Suta, Vilhelms Purvītis

Biruta Baumane (6 June 1922 – 21 January 2017) was a Latvian figurative painter, one of the most notable of her generation of 20th century artists who developed the "harsh style" as a variety of Socialist realism that dominated in the late 1950s and 1960s in Latvian art. She is best known for her figural scenes, still lifes, portraits and women nudes. She was an honorary member of the Latvian Academy of Sciences and Artists’ Union of Latvia.

== Biography ==
The daughter of teachers Fricis and Lūcija, she was born Biruta Frīdberga on 6 June 1922 in Kalnamuiža, Tērvete parish, Latvia. She had her first encounter with art in Romans Suta’s studio where she studied from 1940–1941. From 1941–1948 she was a student at the Department of Painting of the Art Academy of Latvia. In 1942, parallel to her studies at the Academy, she entered the Faculty of Philosophy at the University of Latvia, but the department was closed down and she moved to the Faculty of Philology in 1944. However, she didn’t succeed in the university final exams. In 1948 she graduated from the Art Academy of Latvia painting department with the graduating thesis piece, entitled Examinations, under the guidance of professor Jānis Liepiņš. Among her professors were also Valdemārs Tone, Vilhelms Purvītis and Ģederts Eliass.

In 1951 she married Latvian sculptor Kārlis Baumanis, with whom she had a daughter Laine Kainaize, also painter.

Biruta Baumane worked as Riga No. 21 School drawing teacher from 1949–1958. From 1959 she was an Artists’ Union of Latvia member. She was given the honorary title of People's Artist of the Latvian SSR (1986) and elected honorary member of the Latvian Academy of Sciences (1994). She was also a lifelong recipient of the State Cultural Foundation Stipend, received the Baltic Assembly award (2002) and the Republic of Latvia Order of the Three Stars (2008) for her creative work and professional achievements.

Baumane died on 21 January 2017 at the age of 94, buried at the Riga Forest Cemetery.

== Exhibitions ==
Since 1956, Biruta Baumane has held more than 19 solo exhibitions in Latvia, Moscow, Kaunas, Ottawa, Algiers, France and her works have been featured in a number of group exhibits. Her first solo exhibition took place at the Artists’ House in Riga in 1966, but she was already noticed in the First Exhibition of Young Artists of the Latvian SSR in 1956, where the new form of Socialist realism, known as the "harsh style", for the first time in public, was presented by her generation of artists including Edgars Iltners, Indulis Zariņš, Džemma Skulme, Rita Valnere, Boriss Berziņš, Ojārs Ābols.

Her paintings are now in the Latvian National Museum of Art, Riga Art Foundation collection, Tretyakov Gallery, Moscow Art Fund and Moscow Artists' Union, National Museum, Poznań, as well as in private collections and galleries around the world.
