= Arnolds =

Arnolds may refer to:

- Arnolds Park, Iowa, city in United States
- Arnolds Park (amusement park), amusement park in Arnolds Park

== People with the surname ==
- Aloysius Arnolds (1835–1896), American politician from Wisconsin
- Andrew Arnolds (elected 2019), South African politician
- Eef Arnolds (born 1948), Dutch mycologist

== People with the given name ==
- Arnolds Baumanis (born 1901), Latvian wrestler
- Arnolds Indriksons (1893–1941), Latvian middle-distance runner
- Arnolds Krūkliņš (1914–1994), Latvian racewalker
- Arnolds Mazitis (1913–2002), Latvian artist
- Arnolds Spekke (1887–1972), Latvian historian, philologist and diplomat
- Arnolds Tauriņš (1905–1984), Latvian footballer, champion of Latvia
- Arnolds Ūdris (born 1968), Latvian cyclist

== See also ==
- Arnold's (disambiguation)
- Arnold (disambiguation)
- Includes any person with first given name "Arnolds"
