= Ludmilla Meilerts =

Latvian Australian painter

Ludmilla Meilerts (1908–1997) was an immigrant Latvian painter who worked in Australia in the mid-20th century.

== Early life ==
Ludmilla Krastins was born in 1908, the 11th of 12 children, in a country town near Riga, Latvia.

After completing her studies, Meilerts worked as a librarian before enrolling in the Academy of Art in Riga in 1929. During her time at the academy, she came under the mentorship of Professor Vilhems Purvītis, a master landscape painter of the French Impressionist style. Under his guidance she learned to paint 'en plein air'.

Ludmilla graduated in 1940, married Otto Meilerts in 1943, and at the end of World War II, when the Soviets invaded their homeland, they fled to Germany where they lived as refugees. Despite enduring the many hardships of living as a displaced person, Meilerts continued to paint and in August 1946, she held her first solo exhibition in Stuttgart.

In early 1948 Ludmilla and Otto took the opportunity to migrate to Australia under the new immigration policy which sought to boost Australia's workforce with European immigrants. They were contracted to work for two years as unskilled labourers in exchange for assisted passage. They were granted Australian citizenship in 1956.

== Work ==
On arrival in Australia in 1948, Meilerts wasted no time in contributing to the local art scene. While still a resident in the Bonegilla Migrant Camp, she entered a local art competition, and later that year, was invited to contribute three works to the annual exhibition of the Society of Artists in Sydney alongside Russell Drysdale, Lloyd Reese, William Dobell, Margaret Preston and Grace Cossington-Smith, among others. This exhibition was opened by Daryl Lindsay, director of the National Gallery Victoria, who noticed her work and encouraged her to hold her first solo exhibition the following year.

In August 1948 Ludmilla was invited to participate in the Annual Exhibition with the Independent Group of Artists at Athenaeum Gallery, Melbourne alongside Lina Bryans, Marjorie North, Edith Alsop, Madge Freeman and Dora Serle. Her works were appraised by The Herald art critic who compared her Bush landscape to Van Gogh with its "lyrical colour and vigorous drawing".

In April 1949 Meilerts held her first solo exhibition at the Georges Gallery in Melbourne which was opened by Major-General P. K. Norris. In an article titled "Modern Art Can Be Beautiful', The Herald opined that most modern art tends to depict ugliness, whereas Meilerts demonstrates that "pictures of beauty and charm can be painted by modern methods." The Age also wrote about the exhibition noting that "her style is distinctive ... the artist has shown that a fresh vision may find material in the local scene capable of being rendered in a higher chromatic range than was hitherto suspected. Both her flower pieces and landscapes go beyond a visual record and express the quintessence of her subject." The exhibition was a great success, and one of her flower paintings was purchased for the National Gallery of Victoria.

Meilerts embraced her new homeland and, despite her lack of a studio, she continued to paint. Together with her husband Otto, she took trips to country Victoria to paint landscapes, her favourite places being Beechworth, Sunbury and the Western District. At one time she exclaimed that, "Australia is so different ... everywhere it is gold, gold, gold, and that's so hard to paint. In Europe the colours are softer."

During the early 1950's Meilerts was a regular finalist in the prestigious Dunlop Art Prize. In the inaugural prize competition, she shared equal fifth prize together with Fred Williams. First prize was won by Sidney Nolan, second by William Frater with Arthur Boyd third and Charles Bush and Len Annois sharing fourth. She was a finalist again in 1951, 1952, 1953 and 1954, continuing to be selected alongside the foremost Australian artists of the time.

In order to maintain financial security, it was necessary for Meilerts to continue her work as a machinist in a clothing factory. The drudgery of this repetitive work took a physical and mental toll on her, and she temporarily gave up painting. However, the need to paint was strong and the solace it gave her was enough to overcome this lapse. Any surface was used to paint on (as was displayed in the ephemera which accompanied her retrospective exhibition in 2014) whether cardboard from cereal boxes or soap powder boxes.

During the 1970's and early 80's Meilerts entered a still life into the Gosford Art Prize which she won. This prize was judged by Daniel Thomas and awarded by Sir Russell Drysdale. In 1980 The Victorian Artists Society awarded her the Pirstitz Gold Medal to honour her contribution to the society and to Australian art.

== Personal life ==
Throughout her life in Melbourne, Meilerts kept close ties to the Latvian community. She sang in a Latvian choir, exhibited alongside other Latvian artists and maintained many friendships within the community.

Meilerts died in 1997, aged 89.

== Prizes and honours ==
- 1950 Dunlop Award equal fifth prize with Fred Williams and Jan Nigro (from 700 entries)
- 1951 December, won Bendigo Art Prize with 'Gladioli' which was acquired by the Bendigo Art Gallery
- 1954 August, artist Esther Paterson holds a reception in honour of Meilerts at the Lyceum Club Melbourne.
- 1955 Art Gallery of Western Australia acquires 'Roses'
- 1969 Special prize at Camberwell Rotary Art Show judged by Brian Finemore, curator National Gallery Victoria.
- 1971 Won Gosford Council Art Award judged by historian and curator Daniel Thomas
- 1975, 1976 & 1977 prize winner at Royal Melbourne Show
- 1982 Gustave Pirstitz gold medal Victorian Artists Society
- 1987 Publication of monograph 'Meilerts' with text by Valentins Sloss and introduction by Sir William Dargie
- 1994 Included in More Than Just Gumtrees; a personal, social and artistic history of the Melbourne Society of Women Painters and Sculptors, Melbourne
- 2008 Entry in Dagnia Greste et al., Australian Latvian Artists in Australia

== Solo exhibitions ==
- 1949 April, Georges Gallery Melbourne
- 1950 March, Athenaeum Melbourne
- 1950 September, Book Club Gallery Melbourne
- 1951 June, Athenaeum Gallery Melbourne
- 1955 August, Athenaeum Gallery Melbourne
- 1982 Honeysuckle Street Fine Art Gallery Bendigo
- 1994 August, Victorian Artists Society Melbourne

== Group exhibitions ==
- 1948 Exhibits with Independent Group Melbourne together with Edith Alsop. Madge Freeman, Fora Serle & Marjorie North
- 1950 Dunlop Award Melbourne (equal fifth prize winner with Fred Williams)
- 1951 July, National touring exhibition with Commonwealth Migration Dept.
- 1954 Exhibition of Contemporary Australian Art selected by directors of State Galleries
- 6 Guinea Show, Peter Bray Galleries Melbourne
- Royal Tour Exhibition, Melbourne Town Hall organised by Fellowship of Australian Artists
- 1955 The Herald Outdoor Art Show Professional Section
- 1955 October, Festival of Perth Contemporary Art Exhibition
- 1956 October, Joint exhibition with Latvian artist Margarita Stipnieks at Victorian Artists Society Melbourne
- 1956 December, Group exhibition of Arts and Crafts by Latvian Australian Women Melbourne Town Hall
- 1962 Organises group exhibition of Latvian artists at Victorian Artists Society
- 1969 Camberwell Rotary Art Show
- 1982 The Fine Arts Gallery, Bendigo

== Retrospective exhibitions ==
- 1998 Solo exhibition to raise funds for the Latvian Postgraduate Studies Fund
- 1999 Melbourne Fine Art Gallery Ludmilla Meilerts: Retrospective
- 2002 Kozminsky Art Gallery Melbourne Ludmilla Meilerts: Colour and Identity A Retrospective Exhibition
- 2013 Posthumous exhibition of Flower Paintings at Metropolis Gallery Geelong
- 2014 Retrospective exhibition Castlemaine Art Museum
- 2017 Melbourne Paintings Posthumous Exhibition Metropolis Gallery Geelong
