= Dace Kidd =

Artist from Riga, Latvia

Dace Kidd is a muralist, portrait painter, and sculptor from Riga, Latvia. She now lives and works in Tyler, Texas.

== Early life and education ==
Dace Kidd was born in 1987, in Riga, Latvia. Kidd studied at the Art Academy of Latvia where she obtained her bachelors in art, as well as studying at Accademia di belle Arti Palermo in Italy from 2008 to 2009. During this time, her paper sculptures and paintings were featured in European galleries.

== Artistic career ==
After graduating, Kidd moved from Latvia, to Tyler, Texas, (within the United States of America) where she has lived since. In her time in Tyler, Kidd has been featured in many local shows, galleries, and exhibits, as well as creating the city logo for the city of Tyler. In 2017, Kidd created her first public mural, being 'The Eyes of Tyler' a striking black, white and red piece pictured in the middle of downtown Tyler. In 2021, Kidd painted what is noted as the largest mural in Texas, being the VeraBank parking garage in downtown Longview, Texas. Her most recent mural, being dedicated to the city of Tyler, is located near the cities downtown district, and was finished in January 2023. She is also the owner of Mural Artists Texas, a visual arts company credited for creating murals across Texas, most notably the East Texas region.

== Selection of shows ==
- 2023 Dace Kidd Solo Show, Arcadia Theater Tyler, TX
- 2015 Americana, Arcadia Theater Tyler, TX
- 2014 TXLV, Arcadia Theater, Tyler, TX
- 2011 Some Luck Involved, Gallery Carousell, Riga, Latvia
- 2010 Spinninghead, Gallery Carousell, Riga, Latvia
