= Arnolds Mazitis =

Latvian artist (1913–2002)

- Born: July 18, 1913; Cēsis, Latvia
- Died: September 15, 2002 (aged 89); London, United Kingdom
- Resting place: Ramuli cemetery, Cesis, Latvia
- Education: Art Academy of Latvia
- Notable work: Girl with a Beret (1950); Atis Teihmanis (1950)

Arnolds Mazitis (Latvian: Arnolds Mazītis; 18 July 1913 – 15 September 2002) was a Latvian artist and a graduate of the Latvian Academy of Arts in Riga. After the Second World War, he lived and worked in Palmers Green, London.

Mazitis created over 1,000 oil paintings, including landscapes, portraits and still life works. Many are in private collections in the United States, Canada, Australia, Germany, United Kingdom and also in Latvia, where a small collection is held by the Latvian Academy of Arts and the Latvian National Museum of Art in Riga.

== Biography ==
=== Early life ===
Mazitis was the second child born to Kārlis Mazītis and Kristīne Zaļaiskalns in the Parish of Ramuli, Cēsis. He attended the State Vocational School in Cēsis from 1929 until 1932, where he was taught by Ernests Veilands, Pēteris Kundziņš and Kārlis Zemdega among others.

In 1932 he moved to the Riga Polytechnical Institute and completed an additional course in drawing and painting. A year later, the artist was accepted as a student in the Latvian National Academy of Art where his fees were waived. From 1932 to 1937 he completed the foundation course in art with a first class diploma, interrupted only by military service from 1935 to 1936 with the Latvian 8th Infantry Regiment in Daugavpils.

He joined the student group Green Earth (Zaļā Zeme) in 1935. Founding members were Jūlijs Viļumanis (1909-1981), Kārlis Danne (1909-1939), Nikolajs Breikšs (1915-1942), Andrejs Šulcs (1910- 2006), Antons Megnis (1907-1982).

In 1938, he joined the Muksala Artists' Society, founded in 1932 by Ansis Artums (1908–1997), Arvīds Egle (1905-1977), Anšlavs Eglītis (1906-1993), Vilis Linga (1899-1962), Burhards Mednītis (1903-1982), Kārlis Neilis (1906–1991), Oskars Norītis (1909-1942), Arnolds Nullītis (1896-1988), Vilis Valdmanis (1906-1980), as also did his contemporaries Voldemārs Jansons (1912-1980), Anna Dārziņa, (née Ozoliņa, 1911-1998), and Veronika Janelsiņa (1910-2001).

=== Onset of war ===
In the autumn of 1938, he continued his studies in the Latvian Academy in figurative art under Professor Ģederts Eliass (1887-1975) and Professor Valdemārs Tone (1892-1958), but this was interrupted in 1942. Socially, politically and culturally, this was a turbulent period in Latvia's history. The Soviet Union first imposed its demand for military bases on the three independent Baltic nation states in 1939. It then invaded the three Baltics States, including Latvia, in 1940 and in 1941, the German army invaded Latvia. The Soviet Union then re-occupied Latvia in 1944.

Mazitis was mobilised by the German Army in 1944, just before the Soviet Army's advance later that year. Because of his academic training, he became an official war artist for the German Army, along with other Latvian artists, such as G. Matvejevs (1910-1966) and J. Soikans (1920-1995).

After the defeat of the German Army, Mazitis sought refuge in Lübeck, Germany, then in Malmö, Sweden, in 1946, and then in Meerbeck, Germany. Professor Valdemārs Tone – also a refugee – joined Mazitis in Meerbeck in 1946, where, with Erasts Šveics (1895-1992), they were allowed a small studio above a postal office in the Meerbeck displaced persons camp. Although they were short of materials, they managed to paint, exhibiting in Oldenburg in 1946 and in Bad Oeynhausen in 1948.

=== Life in England ===
In 1947, his wife, Aina Jansone (1913-1999), went to England with their children to find a place to live and work. Mazitis joined his wife in England in 1949. England accepted refugees from the Baltic States on condition they work a minimum of three years as manual labourers in factories, workshops, hospitals, mines and farms.

On his arrival in England, Mazitis started to establish himself in the artistic life of his new home country. In 1950, a portrait of his oldest daughter Ieva, Girl with a Beret, was accepted at the Royal Academy of Arts for its summer exhibition and the portrait was shown in London as well as in Brighton. He joined Smiths Industries in 1954 as a freehand designer, working on speedometers for Rolls-Royce and Jaguar cars.

The artist continued to paint throughout the 1950s, 1960s and 1970s: exhibiting in London (portraits of children, sponsored by the Observer Newspaper) in 1954; in Munster, West Germany in 1962; Hamburg in 1964; Toronto in 1968; Leicester in 1971; Toronto and Hamilton in Canada in 1972; Montreal and London Ontario, Canada, in 1973; New York and also Boston, USA in 1973.

In 1973, at the age of 61, Mazitis retired from Smiths Industries to devote the rest of his life to his art. He continued to exhibit new works throughout the 1970s and 1980s and in the 1990s. The Schwartz Sackin and Co. gallery and the Bruton Street Gallery were active sellers of his works. His last public exhibition was in the Haste Gallery in Ipswich in 2000.

In 1993 he was awarded the title of Honorary Professor of the Latvian Academy of Arts. Mazitis died in September 2002.

== Private life ==
In 1938 Mazitis married Aina Jansone (1913-1999), a reader for one of the main Latvian publishing houses, Valters and Rapa. Their winter wedding inspired a scene in Anslavs Eglitis's (1906-1993) first novel Bride Hunters (Ligava Mednieki, 1954).

They were both closely involved in the artistic and literary world of 1930s Latvia. The author Anšlavs Eglītis, lived in a neighbouring apartment (#17) at 21 Thomson Street, Riga, and was a fellow artist and a regular chess partner. Jansone was closely involved in the literary life of pre-war Latvia and Mazitis was active in the art world.

They had two daughters, Ieva, born in 1943 and, Anna, in 1946. Jansone divorced Mazitis in 1953. In 1955, he married Gaida Trezina (1919-2014), a mezzo-soprano opera soloist and music teacher, from Cesis, Latvia.

== Works ==
In his portraits, still life, and landscapes, the artist's sensory world is expressed through form, colour and texture. He painted in oils and tempera and was an admirer of Professor Valdemars Tone and many renaissance artists, notably Titian, Rembrandt and Velasquez.
