= Maija Dragūne =

Latvian graphic artist

- Born: 19 March 1945 (age 81); Riga, Latvia
- Known for: Graphic arts
- Movement: Modernism

Maija Dragūne (19 March 1945) is a Latvian graphic artist. She works in graphic art and book illustration, as well as paints watercolours. Maija Dragūne made a great contribution to the illustration of Latvian books, working on the editions of notable authors: Ojārs Vācietis, Jānis Baltvilks, Vitauts Ļūdēns.

== Biography ==
Dragūne was born on 19 March 1945 in Riga, in the family of cartoonist Voldemārs Dragūns.

Maija Dragūne has graduated Jānis Rozentāls Art High School (1963) and Department of Graphic Art of Art Academy of Latvia with diploma work - illustrations for V. Majakovski's poem "Good" (1970). Since 1979, she has worked as the artistic editor of the "Liesma" publishing house. She has been participating in exhibitions since 1970, a member of the Artists Union of Latvia since 1973 and a member of Chamber of Graphic Art since 1994.

The artist has received an Artists Union of Latvia diploma and a medal for the best creative performance of the year (1977) for the series of lithographs "Guardians of the surrounding nature" (1976). She was awarded with diplomas at the Tallinn graphics triennials (1983, 1987, 1989), with a silver medal at the Paris Spring Salon (1984) and at the 2nd miniature graphics triennial in Riga, she received the Riga City Prize and a commemorative medal (1987). Dragūne's works are in the collections of various Latvian museums, as well as in private collections in Latvia and abroad.

== Art ==
Dragune's black and white lithographs are characterized by strong contrasts, painterly tonal transitions, the multi-layered nature of the artistic image, and poetics permeated with sharp irony. The portraits reveal the continuity and changeability of the development of a person's inner world. The artist realizes book illustrations in the technique of lithography, watercolour, gouache, ink and crayon drawing, harmonizing all the elements of book construction in a single artistic ensemble.
