= Lilija =

- Gender: Female
- Name day: April 30

Origin
- Region of origin: Latvia Lithuania

Lilija is a Latvian and Lithuanian feminine given name. The associated name day is April 30.

== Notable people named Lilija ==
- Lilija Dinere (born 1955), Latvian painter and illustrator
- Lilija Eugenija Jasiūnaitė (born 1944), Lithuanian painter and textile artist
