= Frančeska Kirke =

Latvian painter

- Born: December 15, 1953 (age 72); Riga, Latvia
- Known for: Painting
- Movement: Postmodernism

Frančeska Kirke (Latvian: Frančeska Kirke) (December 15, 1953) is a Latvian painter. She entered the world of Latvian art in 1974, actively participating in exhibitions both in Latvia and abroad.

== Biography ==
She was born Frančeska Kirke on December 15, 1953, in Riga, Latvia, in a family of artists. Her father is Gunārs Kirke, mother – Večella Varslavāne and grandfather – Francisks Varslavāns. Her husband is Andrejs Silenieks, a cinematographer.

Frančeska Kirke has graduated Jānis Rozentāls Art High School (1972) and Department of Painting of Art Academy of Latvia with diploma work "Iskra" Rīgā (1978). She has been participating in exhibitions since 1974 and is a member of the Artists Union of Latvia since 1982.

She has received awards from the Artists Union of Latvia in 2001 Gold Medal for the personal exhibition "Museum" in the Latvian National Museum of Art, as well as in 2002 the award for important curatorial work in the exhibition "Metropole. Riga ". The most notable recent performance is the solo exhibition "Trauslums/Fragila" at the Art Museum Riga Bourse (2019). Franceska Kirke's works are included in public collections: Latvian National Museum of Art and Artists Union Museum (Riga, Latvia), Museum Ludwig (Cologne, Germany), Tretyakov Gallery (Moscow, Russia), Jane Voorhees Zimmerli Art Museum at Rutgers University (New Brunswick, New Jersey, UNITED STATES).

== Art ==
She is an artist of fine taste and wide range, who has done monumental paintings, record covers, worked in the production of two puppet films and drew illustrations. She has discovered a significant contribution and her abilities in painting (Tribute to F.Varaslavāns, 1979; Grotesque Masks, 1979; Self-portrait with a Brush, 1981; Breakfast, 1981; Femme Fatale, 1993; Diva, 1993; Amadeus, 1993/94). A deeply emotional artist who rapidly changes and evolves in terms of means of artistic expression. Kirke's approach to the great problems of the world and classical images is relevant, but the connection of these motifs with today is often affected by the presence of irony and the grotesque.
