= Ance Eikena =

Latvian artist

Ance Eikena (born 6 May 1997) is a Latvian artist.

== Biography ==
Eikena (born Vilnite) graduated from J. Rosenthal School of Art. She graduated from the Visual Communication Unit of the Latvian Academy of Art (2022). Eikena has completed various sculpture works, environmental objects, installations, and performances. She participated in Rīgas Fotomēnesi, Tēlniecības kvadriennālē, Academia exhibitions and “Laktācija” at the Latvian National Museum of Art and elsewhere.
