= Boriss Berziņš =

Latvian painter

Boriss Berziņš (7 October 1930, Riga – 11 February 2002, Riga) was a Soviet and Latvian artist, painter, graphic artist and teacher. People's Artist of the Latvian SSR (1989), Corresponding Member of the USSR Academy of Arts (1988).

From 1947 to 1952 he studied at the Jānis Rozentāls Art High School. In 1952 he enrolled at the Latvian Academy of Art and graduated from it in 1959. Since 1955 he participates in exhibitions. Since 1961 – member of the Artists' Union. Since 1964 she taught at the Art Academy of Latvia.

In 1973, the first solo exhibition of the artist at the Latvian National Museum (all on account of the artist's 50 collective and 15 solo exhibitions).

Commander of Order of the Three Stars, a lifelong scholar of the State Fund of Culture Capital, received the prize of the Latvian Culture Foundation Spīdola for lifetime contribution to the arts.

In 2002, under the will of the artist all the works were transferred to the Latvian National Museum of Art.
