= Ansis Artums =

Landscape painter (1908–1997)

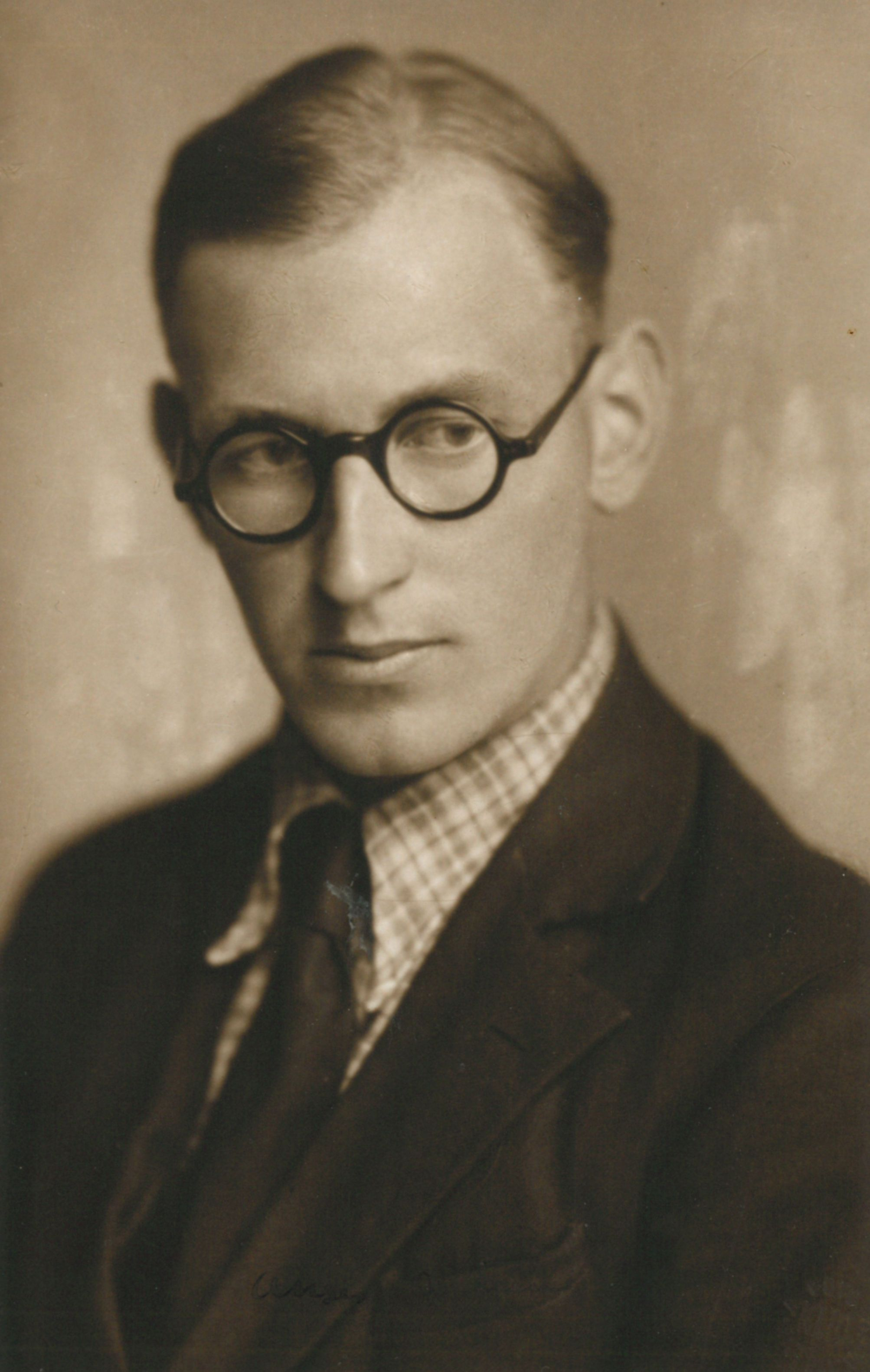
- Ansis Artums in 1933
- Born: 15 January 1908; Riga, Governate of Livonia, Russian Empire (now Latvia)
- Died: 13 January 1997 (aged 88); Tukums, Latvia
- Education: Art Academy of Latvia
- Years active: 1933–1997
- Known for: Painting
- Movement: Landscape, Still life

Signature
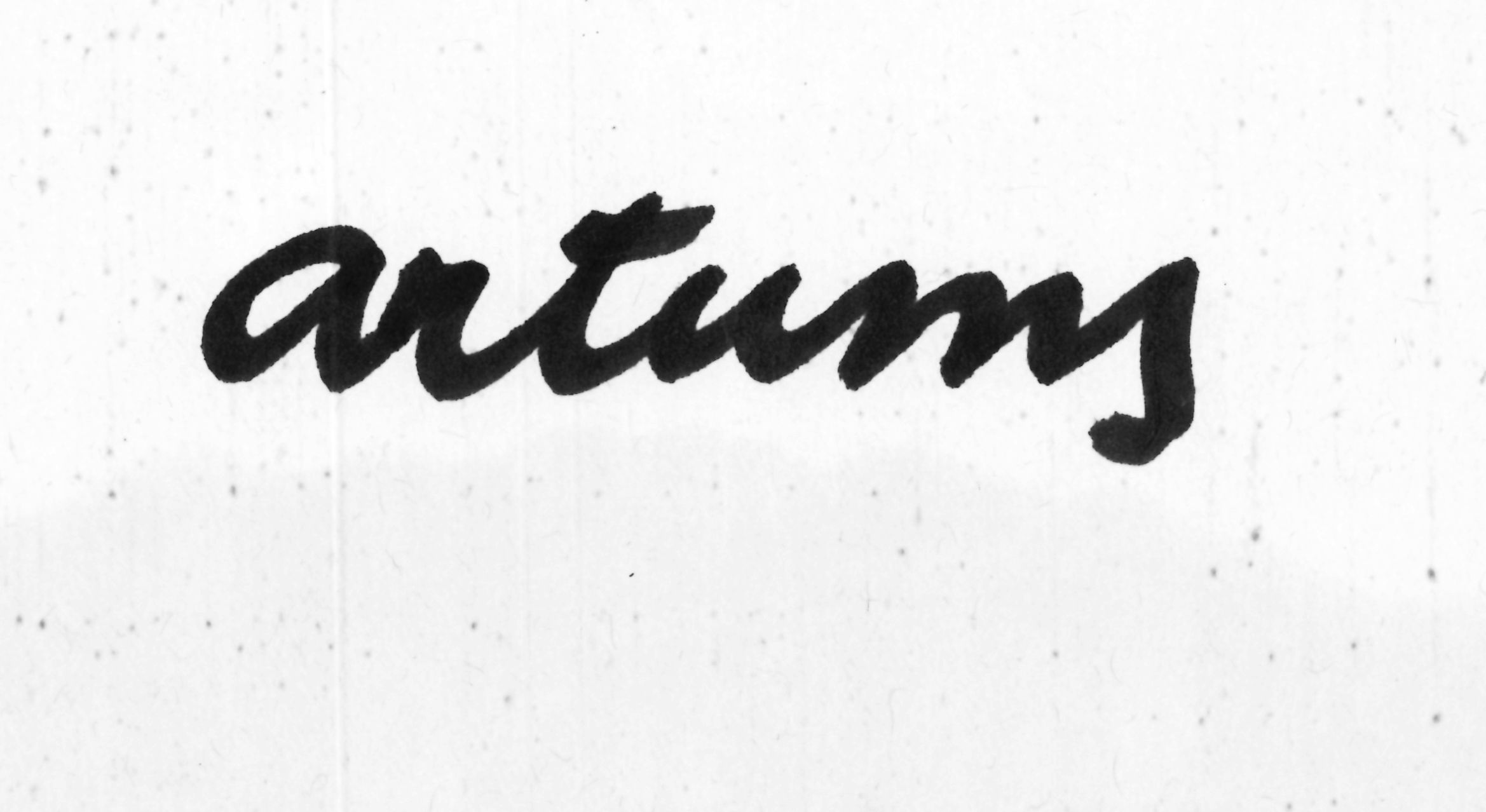

Ansis Artums (15 January 1908 – 13 January 1997) was a Latvian landscape painter and master of still life, who worked in oil painting technique. He spent most of his life in Tukums. Artums is most widely known for his paintings of spring and summer [andscapes, blooming gardens, flower Vases, landscapes of Tukums, blooming chestnut trees, lilacs, and fritillaries.

In the early stages of his creative work, the artworks of Artums had muted, heavy color tones, while later on he started to use bright, contrasting colors, also changing the brush stroke technique. Artums was a member of the Mūkusala Artists' Group. Alongside painting, he worked in a ceramics atelier.

A large part of Artums works belong to private, as well as to museum collections – Latvian National Museum of Art, Tretyakov Gallery, Latvian Artists’ Union Gallery, Tukums Museum, Kuldīga District Museum, Liepāja Museum, Jūrmala Museum, etc.

== Biography ==
=== Education and first work experience ===
In 1927, Artums enrolled in the Art Academy of Latvia. Before the entrance exams, he briefly attended the studio of Kārlis Miesnieks. Artums was among the twenty admitted students in the competition of more than a hundred applicants. At the Academy, among his educators were Voldemārs Tone, Konrāds Ubāns, Augusts Annuss, Ludolfs Liberts, Vilhelms Purvītis, Kārlis Miesnieks, Eduards Brencēns, Ģederts Eliass, and Boriss Vipers.

During the second study year, Professor V. Purvītis invited Artums to join his Landscape Painting Workshop. Eduards Kalniņš, Ārijs Skride, Kārlis Melbārzdis, Jūlijs Viļumainis, Edgars Vārdaunis, Oto Pladers, Nikolajs Breikšs, and Arvīds Egle studied along with Artums in the workshop. Artums learned the spirit of V. Purvītis' concept without imitating the basics of its form.

In the winter of 1933, Artums graduated from the Art Academy with a diploma work "Landscape of Tukums". During his studies, Artums joined the Mūkusala Artists' Group, where young artists worked in the workshop led by V. Tone on Mūkusalas Street in Pārdaugava. The group's artists were very diverse and declared affiliation with the traditions of V. Tone, K. Ubāns, and Teodors Zaļkalns. They organized annual exhibitions.

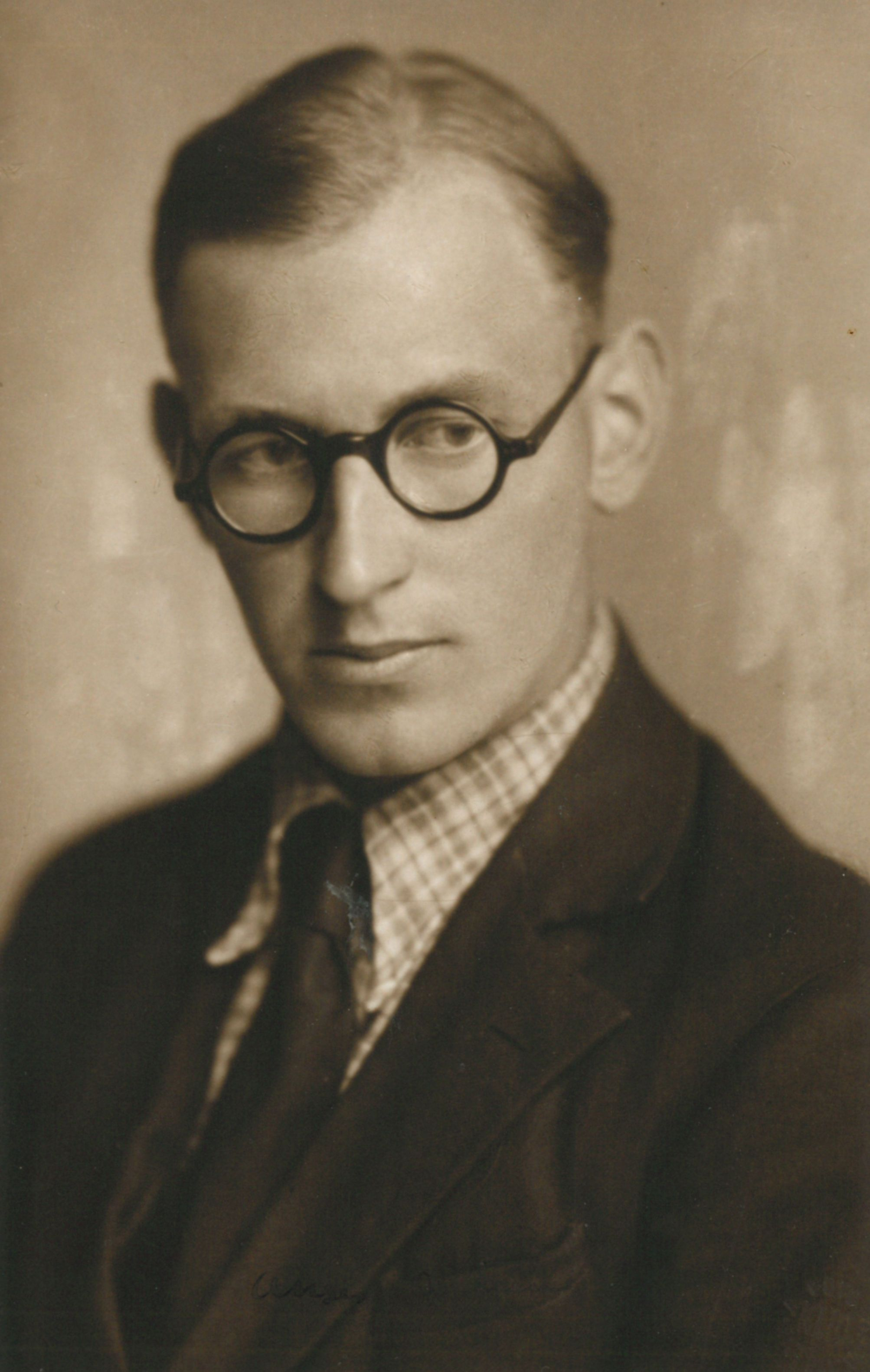
The artist graduating from the Academy in 1933

=== Personal life ===
In 1933, after graduating from the Academy, Artums moved back to Tukums. From 1934 to 1935, he served in the military in Daugavpils. After his service, Artums once again returned to Tukums and dedicated himself to painting, while working at Jānis Krievs ceramics atelier hand painting ceramics.

Artums visited the big exhibitions in Moscow and St. Petersburg and created his art book collection. In addition to his interest in art, he had a strong appreciation for classical music and possessed a significant understanding of the subject. Artums owned a large collection of recordings of classical compositions. The artist regularly attended concerts in Latvia and other Soviet Union republics.

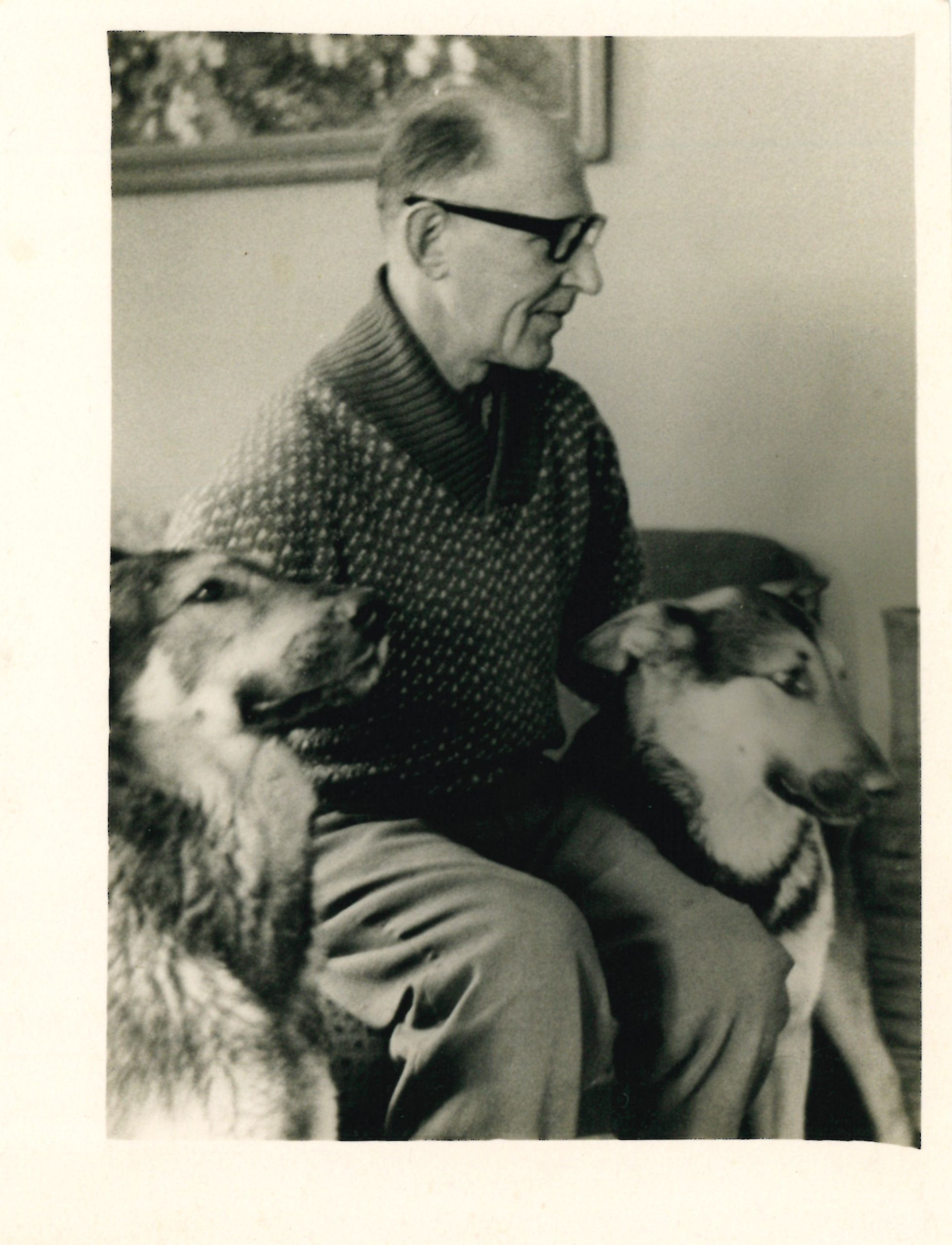
With Bento and Joey in the 1960s

=== Spouse Milda ===
In the 1930s Artums met Milda Dombrovska (1898–1975). In 1940, they started to live together. Artums continued to paint and work in J. Krievs ceramics atelier, while his spouse managed the household, growing flowers. Contemporaries vividly remembered Milda's independent, proud spirit, fiery temper, sparkling joy of life, extraordinary taste, and skill in organizing celebrations. The artist's spouse Milda died in 1975.

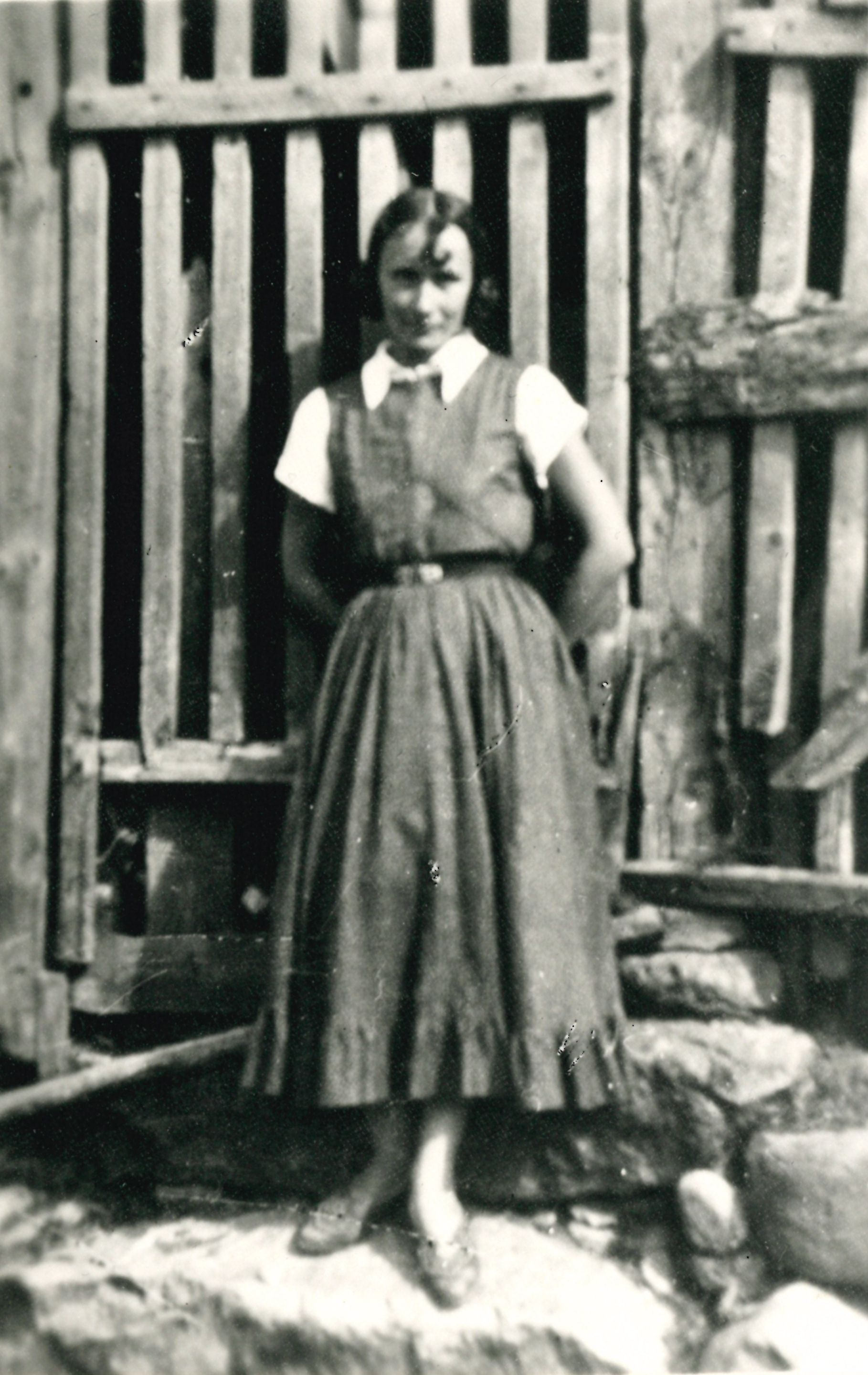
Milda in mid-1930s

=== Early works ===
Very few works from Artums study years have been preserved, so the reviews published in the press about the exhibitions of the works of the Academy's students give an insight into his early works. Critics described the future artist as promising. Jūlijs Madernieks (FR) has expressed that "Artums' studies have a strong treatment of forms with a peculiar brush stroke." Other viewers of the time have noted the "weary color peace in the spirit of Tone-Ubāns" and good technical readiness. From the Academy period, the more widely known works are "Still Life with a Copper Teapot" (1928), "Andrejosta" (1930), "Big Street" (1932), and "Tukums" (1932). Artums' early painting is characterized by the so-called earth tones – heavy, saturated, pasty stroke, pronounced relief texture.

=== Artums' art in the 1930s ===
In the 1930s Artums mostly painted the views of Tukums capturing seemingly unremarkable corners. The interest in supposedly unattractive city corners is justified by the "existence of the large composition line in nature", and the desire to find the aesthetic in the unremarkable. Early works are characterized by panoramics, high horizons, almost static balance of verticals and horizontals ("Landscape of Tukums" (1935), "Station" (1936), "Landscape" (1936), and some other works). Artums participated in annual Tukums artists' works showings, exhibitions organized by the Mūkusala Artists' Group, so-called Zemgale Art Exhibitions, as well as the annual Latvian Art Exhibitions of the Culture Foundation. His works also have been exhibited abroad. The income from the sale of paintings allowed him to plan a trip to one of the European art centers – Paris. At this point, reviews attributed to the young artist "foreign impressions" and "French-Latvian" pictorial handwriting. It was a creative stage in which the artist processed and evaluated the impressions gained in Paris. The 1938–1939 works are mostly held in private collections.

=== Mūkusala Artists' Group and its exhibitions ===
The group included painters who had grown up and developed in their region but zealously followed the culture of Western Europe, including traveling and getting to know art abroad. The first exhibition of the Mūkusala (at that time also referred to as "Mūksala") Artists' Group or union took place from 22 January to 5 February 1933, in the Riga City Art Museum (now: Latvian National Museum of Art). Among others, 6 works of Artums were displayed – "Tukums", "Street in Tukums" (2 paintings), "Landscape near Tukums", "Landscape" and "Sniķe Tavern". Artums also participated in the association's exhibitions in 1935, 1936, 1937, 1938, 1940, etc. Viktors Eglītis described the style of Artums during the Mūkusala artists' activity: "Ansis Artums is also becoming more and more interesting (..). He paints only landscapes and still lifes, (..) in landscapes, his peculiar green-red-gold tones reach great intensity. (..) The still lifes are very vivid, still reminiscent of French masters."(..)" Artums is also credited with some of Valdemārs Tone influence, his landscapes are described as "landscapes of picturesque moods". In the third year of the group's exhibitions, the artist Jēkabs Bīne observed: "Artums' strength is colors, but his weakness is the type and the content of his works. (The other members of this organization also possess some of this last weakness.)

=== Paris ===
In 1937, Artums, together with his friend and fellow student Anšlavs Eglītis, went on a two-month trip to Paris, where he visited exhibitions, museums, the opera, and got to know the atmosphere of Montmartre. Artums was deeply impressed by the Louvre, the exhibition of Vincent van Gogh's works, and the exhibition of El Greco's works. Artists also visited palaces – Versailles, Amboise, and Blois. The trip deeply impressed both friends and even 50 years later A. Eglītis addressed Artums as "my French friend" in his letters from exile.

=== The 1950s ===
Artums still works on figurative painting also, these works were critically acclaimed. Shortly, Artums turned back to his favorite genre – alongside the motives of Tukums, still natures include blooming gardens, chestnut and apple trees, and Slocene river views. In 1957 he held an exhibition together with Aleksandrs Junkers.

Artist's works from the 1950s–1960s are characterized by cycles of the seasons, though not specifically intended and completed they attest to the painter's deep link with nature. He captures nature in the nuances of the seasonal rhythm, his tonal harmony of the sky and water is rich and interesting. The versatility of Artums was revealed: he was able to mute the colors even to soft pastel tones. Artums-istic color is particularly evident in the flower paintings – a specific color intensification, saturation, and peculiar color relations.

=== The 1960s ===
In the 1960s, he still painted the cycles of the seasons, with a special focus on spring. In the works of this era, the painter's joy for the spontaneous beauty of painting is very noticeable. The painter was captivated by spring blossoms. We see particular fondness for the blooming lilacs and chestnuts. He often painted views of the Slocene river.

Artums achieved the internal tension in these paintings with the composition (its axis is formed by diagonals directed to the foreground) and color contrasts (opposites of warm and cold tones). The interpretation of space is essential for enhancing the "inner movement" of natural scenes. The traditional technique of creating the third dimension (diagonal baselines going into the depth of the landscape) Artums adopts with a foreground painted in different intensity. The peculiarity of his handwriting is the almost complete rejection of the aerial perspective. In this and the following decade, Artums also painted a lot of still lifes with flowers in clay pots.

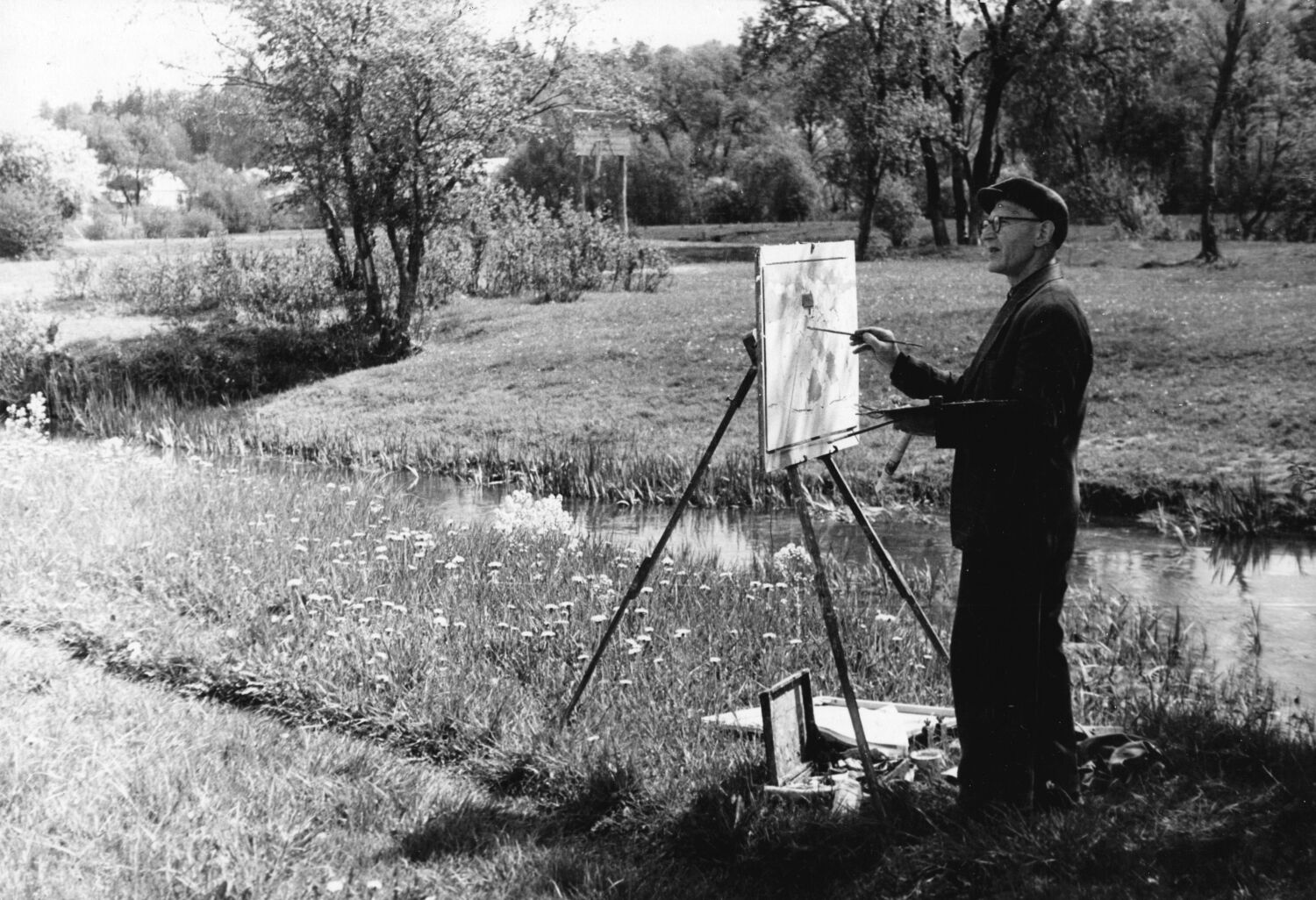
By Slocene in the 1960s

=== 1970s–1990s ===
Artums' palette of landscapes and still lifes became even brighter, especially expressing the artist's passion for the "beauty of painting" itself. Natural views are captured in almost romantic delight. The surroundings of the Slocene river banks were still painted a lot.

A new technique or motif in the paintings: expressive, even dramatic, dark, and scribbled branches of trees and bushes, which stand out against a soft, pastel tonality background. Prosaic nature scenes were also painted, which are given splendor only by some blooming trees.

Spring was still a much-loved period: variations of blooming apple and chestnut trees were also created in the 1970s and 1980s. Various motifs of flowering plants were also sought in summer ("Wind Hemps", 1973). A lot of paintings feature Kurzeme's seaside fishing villages. The still lifes of the flowers of this period are majestically gorgeous: in the springtime, the artist was fascinated by fritillaries, but during the summer – compositions of wildflowers.

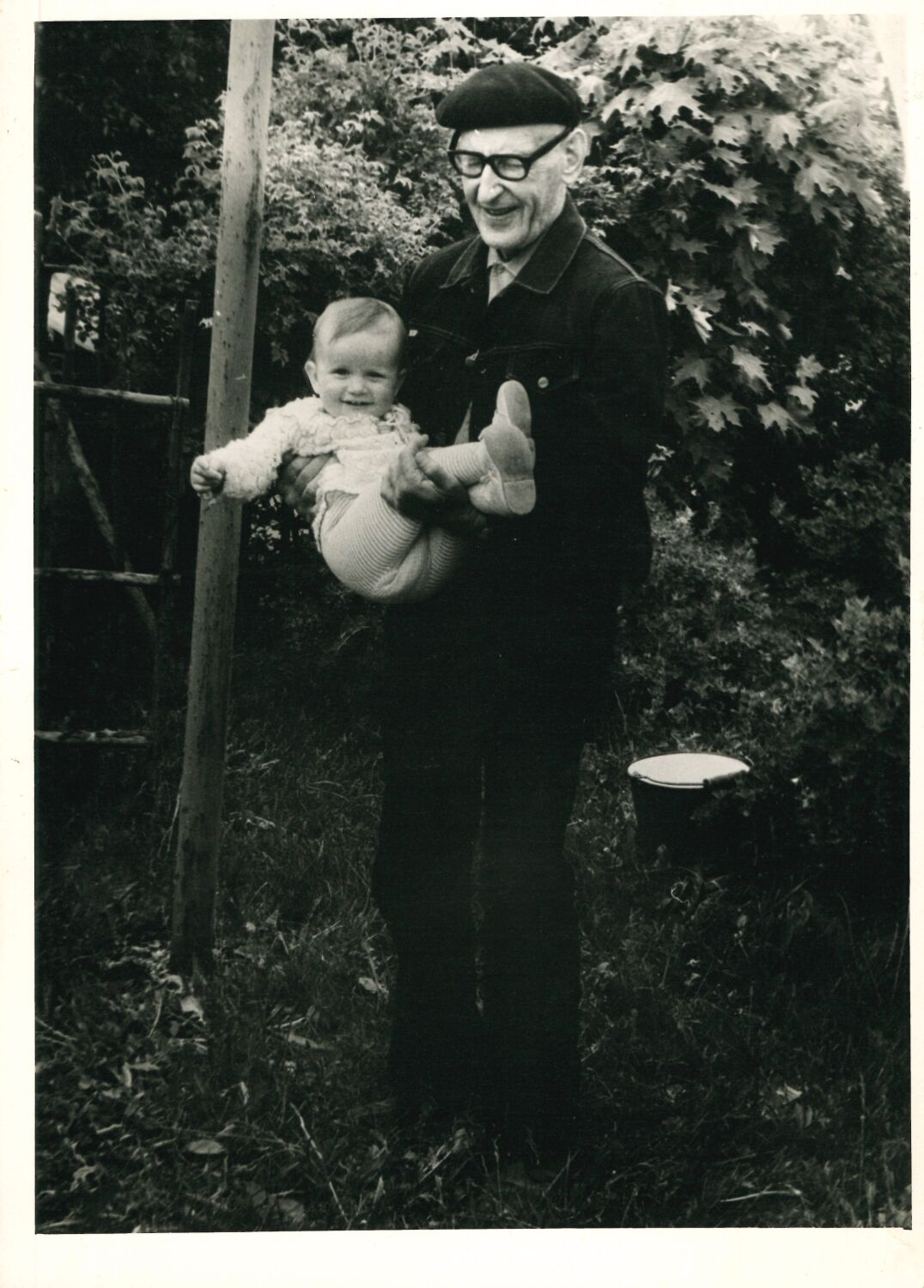
With granddaughter Dita in 1981

=== Work in ceramic ateliers ===
Up until his retirement in 1968, Artum's "day job" was related to decorating ceramics. He initially worked in J. Krievs atelier, from 1945 – in the ceramic ateliers of the Art Fund of the Latvian SSR, and later – in the Tukums Industrial Complex Ceramics Manufactory. Most often, decorated mass-produced dishes with simple engraved ornaments with one-tone glaze. His decorated so-called "small series" vases, and plates, mostly painted with landscapes, are unique and picturesque.

=== Death ===
He died on 13 January 1997. He is buried in Tukums, Veļķi cemetery. The artist's tombstone was created by the sculptor and his friend Arta Dumpe (DE).

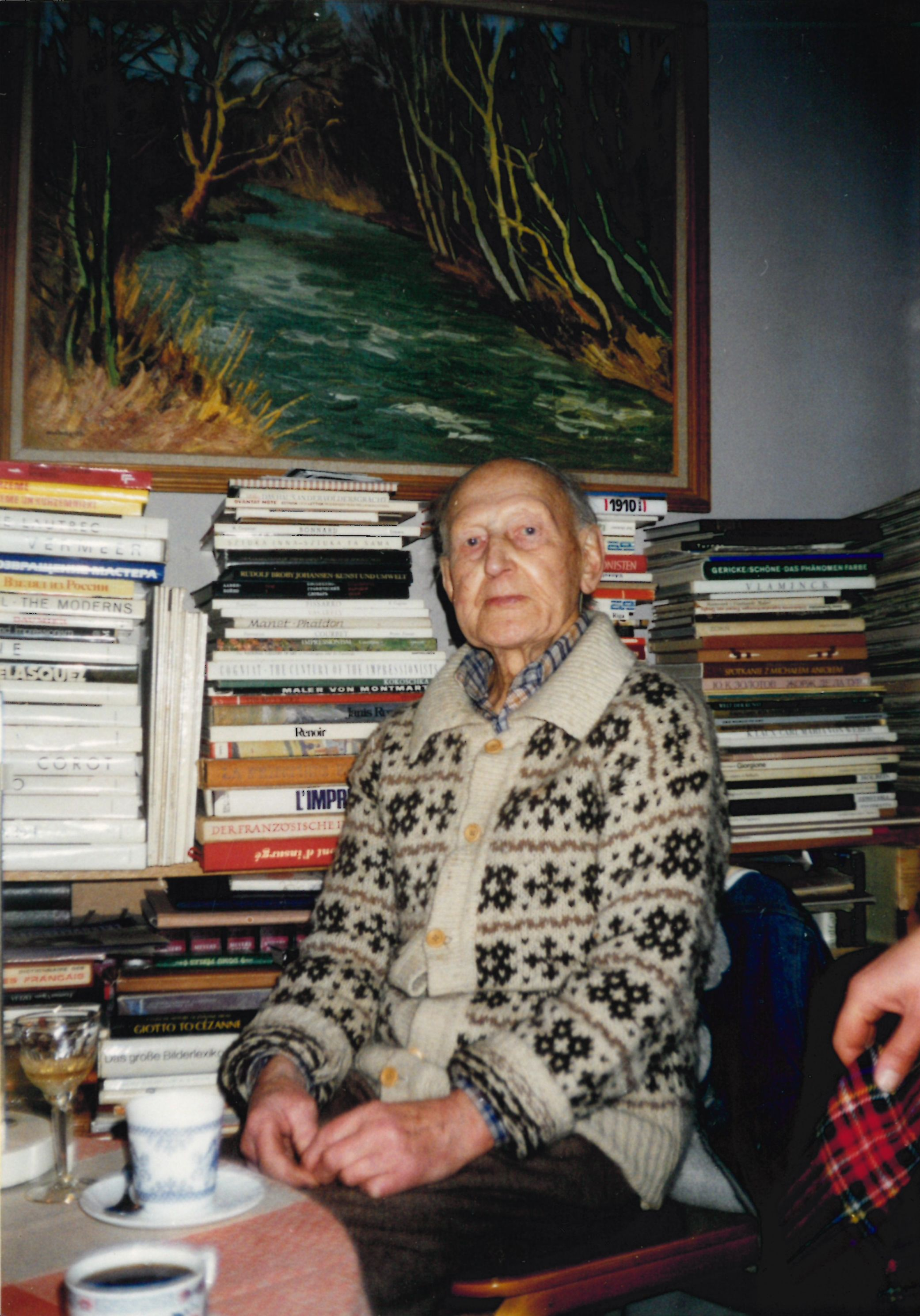
Artums with his extensive collection of books and classical music records in mid-1990s

== Creative work ==
=== Characterization ===
Artums' work can be relatively divided into two stages: the Early one – from the beginning of the 1930s to the mid-1940s – a certain restraint in the choice of colors, a tonality close to earth colors; the Second one – from the 1940s to the end of his life – bright, saturated, and vital color. Cornerstones of creativity: landscape and still life.

Color and nature are primary elements in the pictorial expression of Artums. His painting style has "a colorful sonority and emotionality, picturesque understanding of space and forms, contact with nature, (..) imaginative thinking, which (..) purely intuitively knows how to find the permanent, generalizing in every specific motif."

In the early works, the color palette is still moderate. At the end of the 1930s, Artums, instead of the previously usual harmony of natural colors, brought to the fore the color composition balance dictated by the mind. It can be considered a new level in the development of the author's pictorial thought. However, Artums successfully avoids redundant decorativeness. The works of Artums are compositions of a Fauvist orientation, based on a strict drawing, a framework of shape, and saturated, intense color. Although the painter has taken the color palette from nature, he "removed" the tonally less essential, leaving pure, clear tones. A certain heaviness can be observed – a pasty stroke of paint, a strongly embossed texture. Textures are an important expressive element of Artums' paintings. They help to create an impression of spaciousness and depth in the compositions, as well as giving the paintings a corporeality of objects.

Painter and art historian Olģerts Saldavs formulated Artums' manner: "Artums is being guided by the very joy of the painting process (..), neither complex motifs in nature nor the difficulty of solving them in portrayal scares him. (..) the beauty of painting itself often fascinates the artist." The artist also strives to fill everyday motifs with particularly subtle color radiation.

Regarding Artums' 1970s–1980s paintings, art historian Aija Nodieva has used a conditional division into "picturesque compositions" (a wider landscape covered with a clear, purposeful view) and "picturesque coincidences" (a close-up corner "cut out" of nature that enchanted the artist). At this stage, Artums meticulously cultivated the special sense of nature inherent in his paintings.

=== Work methodology ===
From spring to autumn, Artums worked very intensively in nature, while from late autumn to early spring he prepared for the next period. Artums used only specific canvases, so-called "French sizes".

Artums happily accompanied friends, talent admirers on rides, as it was an opportunity to explore the surroundings for painting: if a place caught the artist's attention, he used to get out and work. Following invitations from acquaintances and friends, Artums also went to paint in Ape, Salacgrīva, Piebalga, etc. For 15 years, Artums spent summers with his family in Apšuciems, where he painted. The seascapes with lilacs and chestnuts blooming in the dunes, much appreciated by collectors, were created there.

The artist himself admitted: "I work more with instinct and feelings. And not like this: rushes out, paints for an hour, and back to the room. In nature, I don't feel hours, I don't feel how time passes, sometimes the whole day goes by without noticing."

Artums art does not have sharp stylistic breaks, and no distinctive periodization: outwardly, his artistic personality has formed in a calm flow. However, although to an observer from the outside, Artums' creative work seems to have developed fluidly and evenly, the artist himself felt his creative growth path as intense and dynamic.

=== Genres ===
Along with landscapes, still lifes occupy a firm place in the art of Artums. In the still lifes, a lot of attention is paid to flowers, but Artums also painted still lifes with fruits, mushrooms, fish, etc. Local colors, corporeality of objects, and even heaviness are accentuated in these still lifes. They are characterized by a sense of stability and thoroughness. Artums also painted the motif of blooming flower gardens, often as if "framing" them by deliberately focusing on a specific group of flowers. Portrait painting was not close to Artums: during his life as a painter, he painted only a few portraits.

=== Participation in exhibitions ===
Artums has participated in countless exhibitions in Latvia and abroad. Starting with the Jelgava artists' exhibition in 1932 until the end of his life, Artums was an active partaker in exhibitions.

During his lifetime, several of his personal exhibitions were held – in Tukums, Riga, Jūrmala. The 1930s are marked by participation in Mūksalieši exhibitions. Later there were numerous exhibitions in Tukums.

Artist's works have been displayed in Riga, Jelgava, Jūrmala, Cēsis, many places in Kurzeme and elsewhere, abroad – in Lithuania, Estonia, Poland, Finland, Hungary, Austria, Denmark, Russia, Georgia, Uzbekistan, Canada, etc.

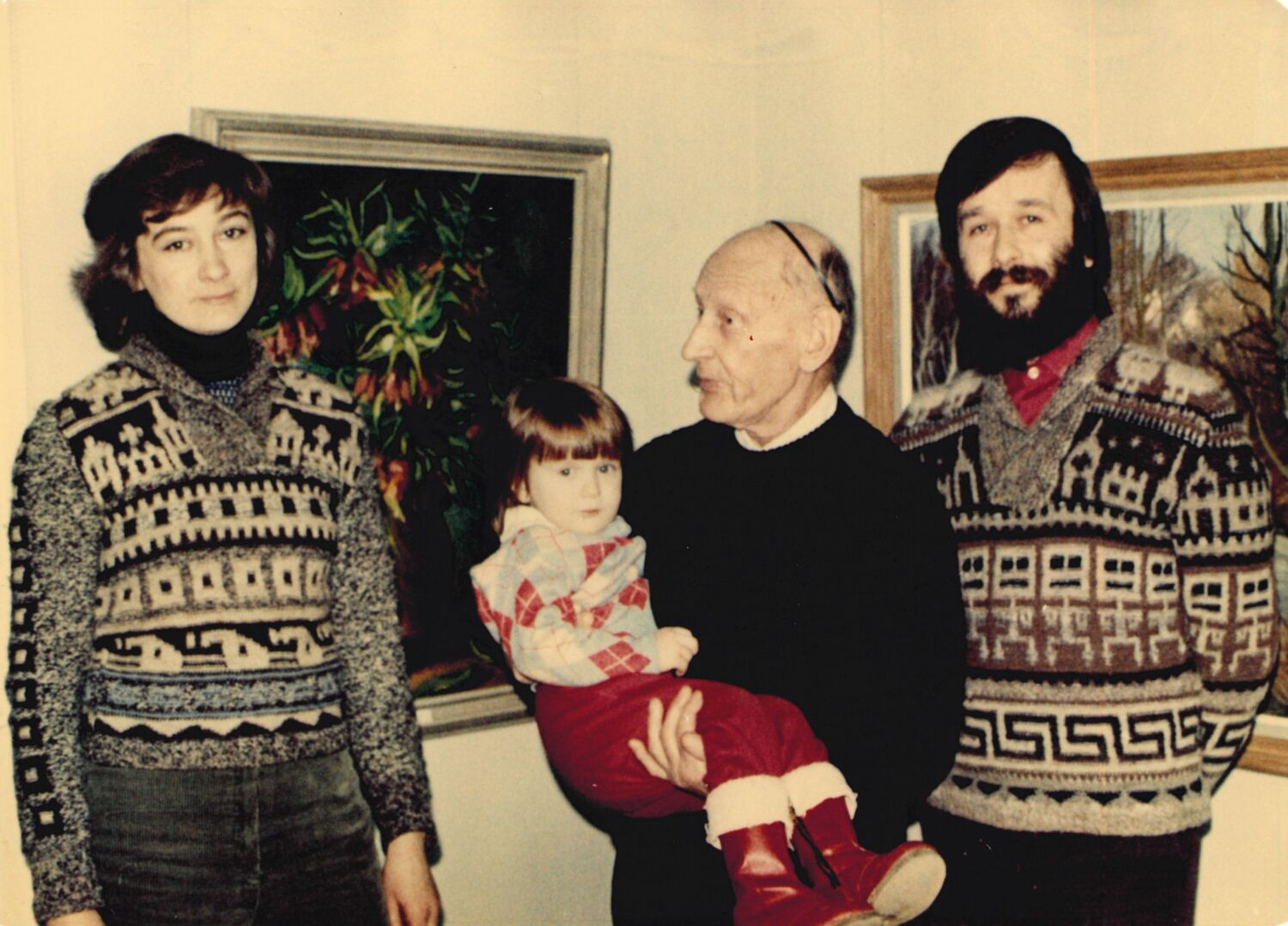
A. Artums together with the family – Dainis, Ārija, and Dita

== Awards, honors ==
After participating in Latvian art exhibitions in the largest European cultural centers of the 20th century. Artums' name was included in the prestigious art encyclopedias of Thieme-Becker, Hans Vollmer, and Meyer's Conversational Dictionary in the second half of the 1930s.

From 1946 he was a member of the Artists' Union. In 1952, Artums was expelled from the union for formality – not painting in a socialist realism manner, then reinstated in 1958.

In 1979 he received an award for the best exhibition of the year. In 1981, Artums received the honorary title of Meritorious Artist of the Latvian SSR.

Numerous catalogs of his exhibitions were published during the artist's lifetime, Artums mentions and reproductions of works are included in various publications. The most important publications dedicated to Artums and his art are Taira Haļāpina compiled reproduction album "Ansis Artums" (Riga: Liesma, 1966) and Aija Nodieva's monograph "Ansis Artums" (Riga: Zinātne, 1986).

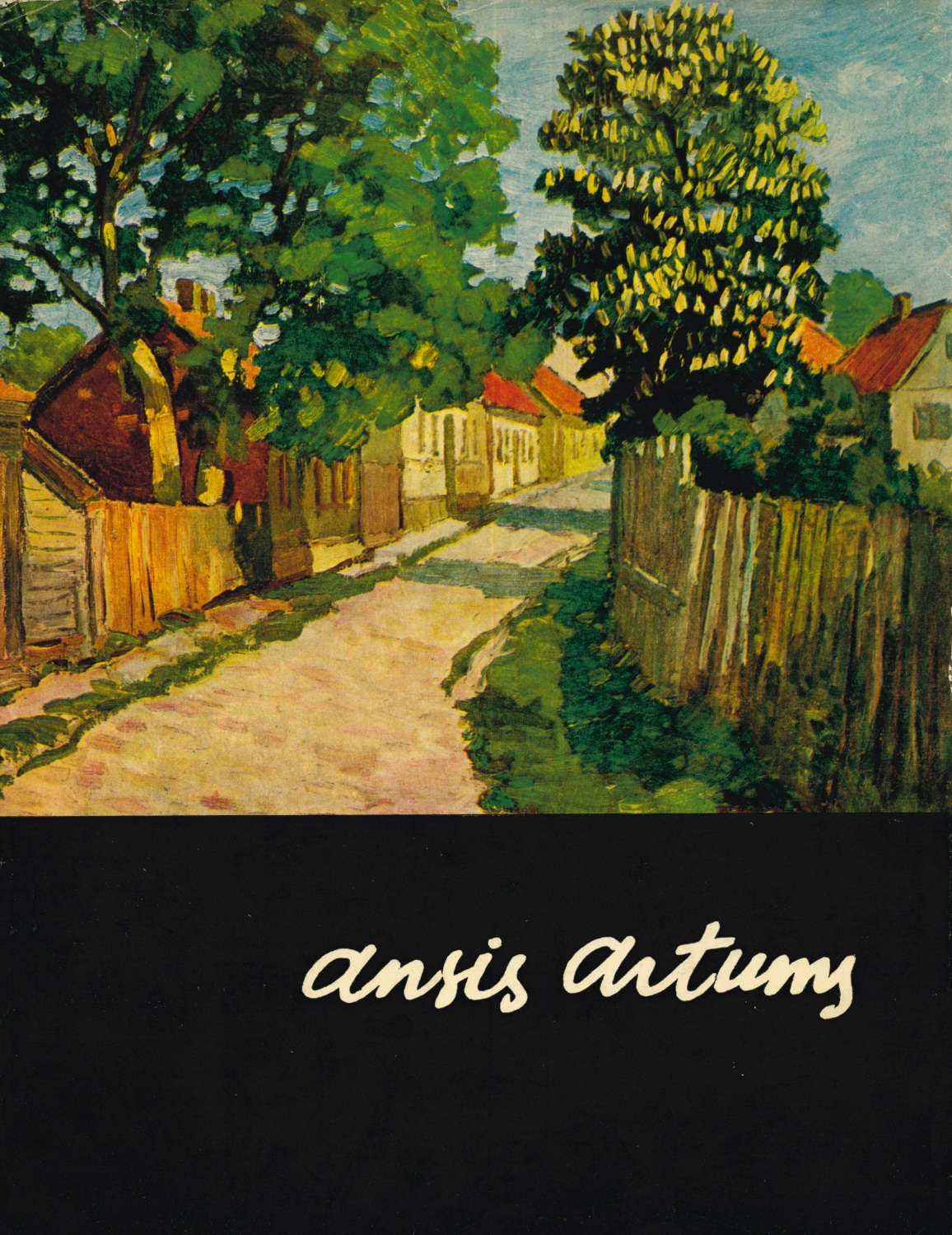
Album of reproductions "Ansis Artums". Compiled by Taira Haļāpina (Riga: Liesma, 1966)

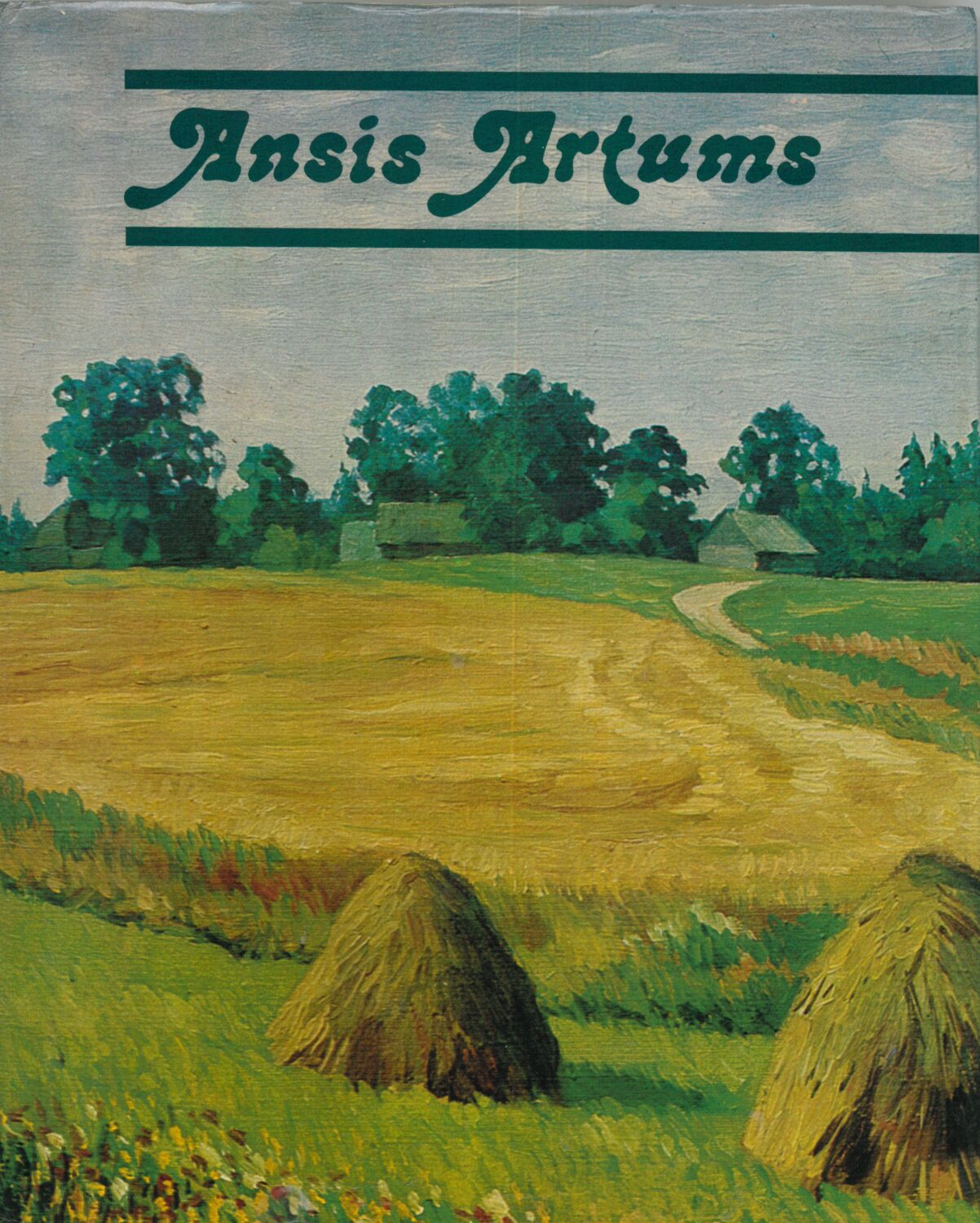
Monograph "Ansis Artums". Author Aija Nodieva (Riga: Zinātne, 1986)
