= Inta Celmiņa =

Latvian painter

- Born: January 7, 1946 (age 80); Riga, Latvia
- Known for: Painting
- Movement: Realism

Inta Celmiņa (Latvian: Inta Celmiņa) (January 7, 1946) is a Latvian painter.

== Biography ==
Celmiņa was born on January 7, 1946, in Riga, Latvia, in a family of laborers. Her husband is Edvards Grūbe, a painter.

Celmiņa has graduated Jānis Rozentāls Art High School (1964) and Department of Pedagogy of Art Academy of Latvia with diploma work Day of Ligo (1969, led by Eduards Kalniņš). She was a senior lecturer at the Department of Pedagogy of the Art Academy of Latvia (1969–1970, 1976–1988), an associate professor at the International School of Practical Psychology in Latvia (2003–2007). In 2001, she obtained a Master of Arts degree. Artist is participating in exhibitions since 1969. Her creative work is highly appreciated in Latvia and abroad. Celmiņa belongs to the first generation of Latvian post-war young avant-garde, which began to draw attention to itself around the mid-1970s. Since 1985, she has held more than 20 solo exhibitions, participated in countless group exhibitions. Celmiņa is laureate of Baltic Republics’ painting trienniale (1975–1978), awarded with silver medal of French Salon in the exhibition Traditions and Searches (1984), title of The Latvian Honoured Art Worker (1990), the prize of Hansabank for the best painting of a year in art gallery Asuna (2006) and is designated as recipient of Order of the Three Stars (2011).

The artist's works are in the collection of the Latvian National Museum of Art, Daugavpils Mark Rothko Art Centre, Zuzeum Art Centre, the Tukuma museum, the Madona museum, the Saldus museum, Artists' Union of Latvia, Tretyakov Gallery, the Ludwig Museum of Modern Art in Cologne, as well as in private collections in Latvia and abroad.

== Art ==
The subject matter of Celmiņa artwork is very rich in various interpretations of the atmosphere. In her means of expression she is purposeful and laconic. The visible shapes she depicts as a sign or symbol and usually chooses large formats, thus exposing the colouring of the work to its inner structure. Texture and brushwork has significant meaning in her creative work. Celmina has worked also with mural painting (mural in kolkhoz club Vienība, 1984; triptych in the kindergarten in Slavutych, 1988).
