= Winter (Purvītis) =

1910 painting by Vilhelms Purvītis

- Ziema (Latvian)
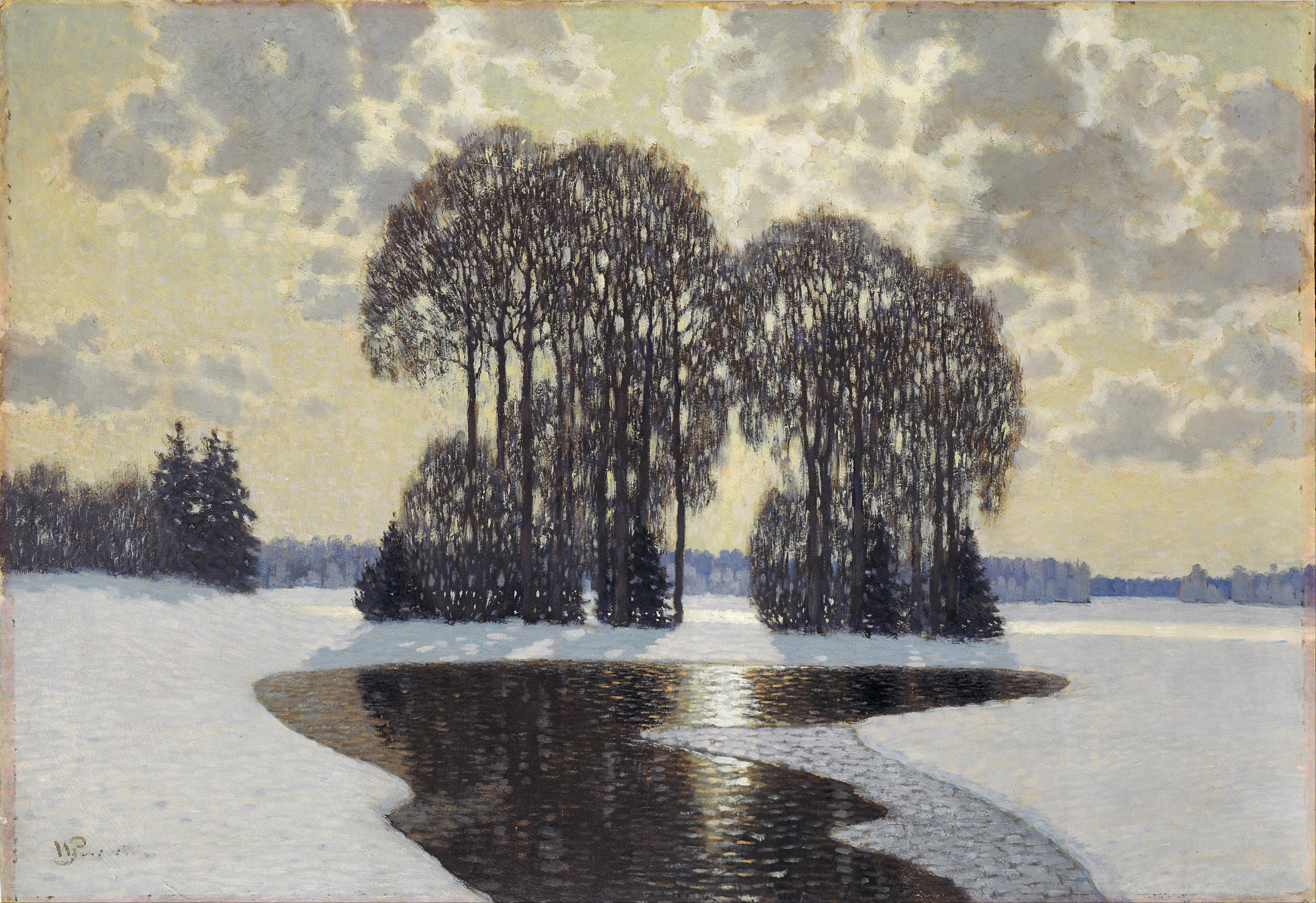
- Artist: Vilhelms Purvītis
- Year: 1910
- Medium: oil on canvas
- Dimensions: 72 cm × 101.3 cm (28 in × 39.9 in)
- Location: Latvian National Museum of Art; Riga

Winter (Latvian: Ziema) is an Impressionist painting by the Latvian painter Vilhelms Purvītis from 1910 .

== Description ==
The painting is oil on canvas with dimensions 72 x 101.3 centimeters. It is held in the collection of the Latvian National Museum of Art in Riga.

== Analysis ==
The subject is a snowy landscape with a half icy river before clusters of trees in the evening sun.

Purvītis is considered the greatest Latvian painter of the 20th century.
