= Līze Dzeguze =

Latvian sculptor (1908–1992)

- Born: 11 January 1908; Stende, Latvia
- Died: 20 October 1992 (aged 84); Riga, Latvia
- Known for: Sculpture
- Movement: Folk art

Līze Dzeguze (Latvian: Līze Dzeguze); (11 January 1908 – 20 October 1992) was a Latvian sculptor mainly noted for her humorous miniature wood carving. She was awarded the honorary title of Merited Worker of Culture of the Latvian SSR.

== Biography ==
Līze Dzeguze was born on 11 January 1908, in Stende in a family of a carpenter.

Acquired professional education at the Art Academy of Latvia (1937-1943) under the guidance of sculptors Kārlis Zāle and Kārlis Jansons. Before her studies she was already well known for her humorous miniature wood-carving (in 1937 she was awarded Golden Medal at the World Exhibition in Paris for her miniatures Jēcis, The Sheperd, Gypsy’s Dance, Dog Catchers, Encounter. She also received awards at the 1st exhibition of applied arts in Riga and at the exhibition of handicraft in Jelgava). During the Soviet period she continued to work in wood-carving (Girl with Geese, 1948–1952; The Sour Gruel of Kurzeme, Gourmand, both in 1959, and other works) and small forms of sculpture presenting heartfelt images of country people (Woman with a Sheaf, 1945; Young Pigtender, 1949) and genre compositions (Above-quota, 1952; After the Joint Effort, 1960; Summertime, 1970; Autumn Crop, 1974). In the creative activity of Dzeguze, a significant place belongs to the animalistic compositions (The Curious Little Otter, 1951; Spring, 1954; Little Fox and Chicken, 1955; Little Raven, 1957; Colt, 1958). In these works as well as in her genre compositions, the artist proves her talent as a psychologist. Her works are made in wood, mostly, and in terracotta, china, and other materials. Her plastic art is marked by a piety towards natural forms, picking out artistically expressive shapes, especially when they are in movement. Dzeguze devoted many years to pedagogical work at the School of Applied Art in Riga (1946-1960) and in different amateur People’s Art Studios. She had participated in exhibitions since 1936. Her works have been displayed at different exhibitions in Latvia and abroad.

Līze Dzeguze died on 20 October 1992, in Riga. She was buried at the Riga Forest Cemetery.

== Selected works ==
Figurative compositions:

- "Woman with a Sheaf", 1945
- "Old Riga Cabman", 1940
- "Difficult Task", 1954
- "Gourmand", 1942
- "Annele", 1980
- "Little Girl", 1980
- "The Dance", 1971
- "Swimming Woman", 1977
- "Girl with a Hen", 1966
- "Cold…", 1979
- "Proposal in a Meadow", 1937
