= Arnold's =

Arnold's may refer to:

- Arnold's Bar and Grill, a restaurant in Cincinnati
- Arnold's Country Kitchen, a restaurant in Nashville
- Arnold's Cove, Canadian town in Newfoundland
  - Arnold's Cove Station, Newfoundland and Labrador
- Arnold's cat map, chaotic map from the torus into itself
- Arnold's giant tortoise, tortoise subspecies
- Arnold's Wrecking Co., 1973 film
- Arnold's Drive-In, a setting on the sitcom Happy Days

== See also ==
- Arnold
- Arnolds
