= Lidija Auza =

Latvian painter (1914–1989)

- "Self-portrait" by Lidija Auza, 1964
- Born: February 24, 1914; Vitebsk, Vitebsk Governorate, Russian Empire
- Died: December 13, 1989; Riga, Latvian SSR, Soviet Union
- Known for: Painting
- Movement: Modernism, Abstract expressionism, Avant-garde

Lidija Auza (February 24, 1914 – December 13, 1989) was a Latvian painter, decorator and teacher. Among the first Latvian artists to apply different auxiliary materials, she is best known for her extraordinary assemblages and abstract paintings. Throughout her career, she became a remarkable figure in Latvian art releasing it from the official rules of socialist realism which encouraged other artists to remain true to their beliefs during the Soviet period.

== Biography ==
Lidija Auza was born on February 24, 1914, in Vitebsk, Belarus, in a peasant family of Latvians. She lost her parents early and was brought up by her stepfather in Riga, Latvia, where she was able to get an education at Riga French Lycée.

In early life, Lidija lived and worked mostly in Riga during the 1930s and 1940s. She graduated from Riga Pedagogical Institute and enrolled at Art Academy of Latvia in 1936, but with the onset of World War II, she postponed her studies and completed a degree of Fine Art only in 1949. From 1934–1943 she worked as a teacher at Riga Elementary School Nr.16 but later started to work as an artist-decorator at Riga Medical Workers House (1946–1947), Institute of History of Latvia (1947–1950) and government buildings in Talsi.

Since 1949, having graduated from the Art Academy of Latvia, Lidija exhibited regularly at galleries and museums in Soviet Latvia. While her works had been successfully featured at exhibitions, in 1951 she was refused membership in the Latvian Artists' Union, accused of formalism in her works, and did not receive the privilege to use a studio. After the Khrushchev "thaw" brought important changes to political and cultural life in the USSR, although the socialist realism was still being cultivated, in 1956 Lidija was finally accepted into the ranks of the union.

From 1973–1980 Lidija took an active part in creative and cultural events in Talsi which has earned her the award of honorary Citizen of Talsi (1983). Her works have been presented at the exhibitions in Soviet Union and Latvia, and featured in collections of the Latvian National Museum of Art, Artists' Union of Latvia and private owners.

Lidija Auza is the mother of two children, son Leonīds Mauriņš and daughter Baiba Mauriņa, both painters. She died on December 13, 1989, in Riga at the age of 75, buried at the Riga Forest Cemetery.

== Artistic career ==
=== Ballet dancers ===
At the beginning of career and during her studies in Art Academy of Latvia, Lidija painted ballet-devoted works and psychological portraits (Velta Vilciņa, Haralds Ritenbergs, Inta Karule, Mudīte Šneidere). Works of this period are allocated with strong construction of compositions and thin colour. The great value in her works is betrayed to movement and gesture. During the final year of studies, she completed her graduating thesis piece, a scene from the ballet entitled Ballet Rehearsal, under the guidance of Jānis Liepiņš, professor and the head of figurative painting studio. The painting has been displayed in Art Academy of Latvia and served as an example for other students for more than ten years. Having graduated with a degree of Fine Art, Lidija continued the dance theme in her work, and her style, characterized by its warm, subdued colours and the mild transitions of light and shadow, developed to the vivid painted abstract compositions with rich textural effects.

=== 1960s and onward ===
In the middle of 1960s Lidija has sharply changed the style, addressing mainly to decoratively abstract compositions where small value is given to a plot, and the special attention is given to an expression, a rhythm and mood. As one of the first in the Latvian painting starts to apply not only paints but also different auxiliary materials - metal shavings, labels from a paper and a fabric, glass splinters (Decor, ca. 1970). In 1980s her work became easier and has got certain symbolical value. Before the independence movements started to rise in Latvia, she was concerned with the impact of systems and avoided catering to what was considered acceptable. Instead of producing socialist realism art, Lidija created radical tectonic-oriented pieces with folk art motifs and symbols to highlight national identity (Nation’s Free Spirit 1969, Short, Short Midsummer's Eve 1968). The Latvian art historian and critic Laimonis Mieriņš described her as “controversial” and “gifted innovator”.

=== Monumental painting ===
The artist turned to murals and landscape painting as well, and created large-sized panels that are included in the list of Latvian art heritage. When the canvas became too small for her imagination, she worked as a muralist and portrait painter, dealing with themes of ecology, ancient history and topical problems of her time. The decorative landscapes she did during the “Talsi period” (1973–1980) feature the characteristic architectural motifs of the city Talsi (triptych Kurland, The City of Nine Hills, Encounter, Unite). From 1980–1982, she also did an order to draw sketches for the stained-glass windows at Liepāja fishermen kolkhoz Boļševiks (The Bolshevik) house in Bārta.

== Selected works ==
Figurative paintings:

- Ballet Rehearsal, 1949
- The Sitting Dancer, 1959
- The Great Waltz, 1964
- Self-portrait, 1964

Decorative paintings:

- Sun, 1961
- Still Life with Roses, 1964
- I Went Through the Silver Grove, 1970
- Decor, ca. 1970
- Triptych Kurland, 1973 – 1976
- The City of Nine Hills, 1976 – 1978
- Blue Fishes, 1980
- Composition of Violet Aquarium, ca. 1980
- Composition of Red Fishes, ca. 1980

== Solo exhibitions ==
- Talsi Regional Museum (Talsi). 1966, 1975, 1986
- Artists House / Mākslinieku nams (Riga). 1966, 1971, 1975, 1984, 1986
- Jelgava History and Art Museum (Jelgava). 1966
