= Inta Dobrāja =

Latvian painter (1940–2020)

- Inta Dobrāja
- Born: Inta Vizbule; 14 January 1940; Riga, Latvia
- Died: 4 June 2020
- Known for: Painting
- Movement: Realism

Inta Dobrāja (Latvian: Inta Dobrāja) (14 January 1940 – 4 June 2020) was a Latvian painter mainly noted for her still lifes with flowers, portraits and nudes.

== Biography ==
She was born Inta Vizbule on 14 January 1940 in Riga, Latvia, in a family of labourers. Husband – painter Kārlis Dobrājs. The roots of Inta Dobrāja's family are in Nogale, Talsi Municipality, where grandmother Emma Liepiņa lived and where mother Jete was born. Inta Dobrāja was born in Riga, but studied from the first to the fifth grade at the seven-year school in Nogale.

She studied at the ceramics department of the Riga Applied Arts High School (1954-1959), in 1967 she graduated from the Art Academy of Latvia’s Painting Department with a diploma thesis "Ceramics" (supervisor Eduards Kalniņš). At the end of the 1960s, Inta Dobrāja went to Daugavpils with her husband and some graduates of the Art Academy to found a branch of the Union of Artists there. During this time, the artist created works that directly depicted childhood impressions, such as "Fairytale" (1968) and "Playhouse" (1969). Between 1966 and 1970, she worked at the "Centība" factory and at the Vangažu reinforced concrete constructions factory as a senior aesthetic engineer. Inta Dobrāja has been a member of the Artists Union of Latvia since 1972. Participated in exhibitions since 1968. The most important solo exhibitions in Daugavpils (1977, 1986, together with K. Dobrājs), Straupe, Jelgava, Limbaži, Krāslava (1986, together with K. Dobrājs), Riga (1987), Vaidava, Nogale Manor (1988). The artist regularly participated in national and international exhibitions.

The works are in Latvian and foreign museums: the Latvian National Museum of Art, the collection of the Artists' Union of Latvia, the University of Latvia, the Daugavpils Museum, the Krāslava Museum, the Tretyakov Gallery in Moscow, in private collections in Latvia, Russia, the USA, Denmark, France, Finland, Italy, Japan, Greece, Sweden, In Israel, Poland, Estonia, Australia and elsewhere. The artist has been awarded the prize of the Ministry of Culture of Latvia in the competition exhibition for the best work of visual art (1981), with the silver medal of the USSR’ TSSI for the painting "Morning" (1981).

== Art ==
Inta Dobrāja's painting is close to the classical tradition - it shows finely cultivated craftsmanship, simplicity of themes and content, and harmony. Dobrāja's artwork is realistic, based on the tonal-spatial painting characteristic of Latvian classical art. The artist mainly paints flowers, still lifes, nudes and figurative compositions. They are dominated by women depicted in home interiors, in the kitchen, working in the fields or with children, whose external form is characterized by strong, rounded shapes.

== Selected works ==
Figurative paintings:

- Potato Diggers, 1980
- The Beet Field, 1985
- Country Madonna, 1986

Portraits:

- Jānis, 1980
- Anete in Blue, 1986
- Plein Air Self Portrait, 1988

Nudes:

- Mother with Child, 1983
- In the Evening, 1986
