= Jānis Liepiņš (painter) =

Latvian painter

- Born: August 8, 1894; Riga, Livonia Governorate, Russian Empire
- Died: September 2, 1964 (aged 70); Riga, Latvian SSR, Soviet Union
- Education: Kazan Art School (1911–1913)
- Known for: Painting
- Style: Cubism, expressionism, constructivism, realism

Jānis Liepiņš (August 9, 1894 – September 2, 1964) was a Latvian painter from Riga. He studied at Jūlijs Maderniek's studio in Riga between 1909 and 1910, at the Kazan Art School 1911–1913, and at Marcus Bernstein's studio in St Petersburg 1913–1917. He was a member of the Riga Artists' Group and professor of painting at the Art Academy of Latvia 1940–1950. During the 1920s Liepiņš was active in the left-wing press.

Liepiņš is credited with having introduced the theme of fishermen into Latvian genre painting. He also created still lifes of various subjects (tavern scenes, gamblers, peasant life), drawing particular attention to the social aspects.
