= Ēvī Upeniece =

Latvian sculptor (1925–2024)

- Born: 22 August 1925; Riga, Latvia
- Died: 29 August 2024 (aged 99)
- Known for: Sculpture

Ēvī Upeniece (22 August 1925 – 29 August 2024) was a Latvian sculptor who worked within the portrait genre. She received the Republic of Latvia Order of the Three Stars (2021) for her creative work and professional achievements.

== Biography ==
Ēvī Upeniece was born Ēvī Upeniece on 22 August 1925 in Riga to Eduards Upenieks, a Latvian foreman of a veneer factory in Sarkandaugava, and an Estonian mother, Leida Upeniece (née Oinas). Her husband was sculptor Vladimirs Rapiķis.

Upeniece studied at Riga School of Fine Arts (1944–1946) and graduated Art Academy of Latvia with diploma work Portrait of Arturs Frinbergs (1952) under the guidance of sculptor Teodors Zaļkalns.

Upeniece worked at the combine Art (1952–1980) and was a teacher of the ceramics group at Riga 45th secondary school (1964–1977). She has been participating in exhibitions since 1953 and was a member of the Artists Union of Latvia since 1957. Her works have been presented at the republican, USSR exhibitions and abroad. In 2021, she was awarded the Order of the Three Stars, V Class.

Upeniece died on 29 August 2024, a week after she attained the age of 99.

== Art ==
Upeniece worked mainly in statuary and decorative sculpture. Her works are characterized by lyricism and an intimate chamber atmosphere. She realized her ideas using bronze, marble, caper forge, porcelain, and fireclay. The sculptural forms of the works are generally smooth. Their surface is often ground or polished; decoratively expressive textures are sometimes used for contrast. She created portraits depicting mainly women (Astrakhan Fisherwoman, 1960; Bust of a Young Woman, 1963; Astrīda Kairiša, 1975; Maija Tabaka, 1976; Ausma Kantāne, Vija Artmane, 1977; Olga Lisovska, 1979; Elza Radziņa, 1981).
