= Otīlija Leščinska =

Latvian artist (1884–1923)

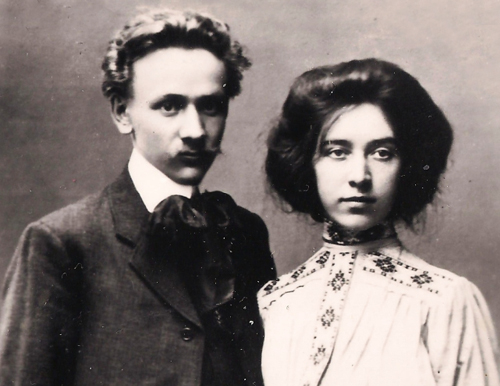
- Leščinska (right) with Kristaps Salniņš in the 1910s
- Born: 22 December 1884; Riga, Russian Empire
- Died: 29 August 1923 (aged 38); Imatrankoski, Finland
- Education: Art school Benjamin Blum, Riga
- Known for: Painting, applied arts
- Movement: Modernism

Otīlija Katerīna Leščinska (22 December 1884 – 29 August 1923) was a Latvian artist and revolutionary. She is recognized as one of the first professional female artists in Latvia and an early pioneer of modernism within Latvian painting.

== Biography ==
=== Early life and education ===
Leščinska was born in Riga, the daughter of the affluent merchant and property owner Kārlis Leščinskis (1853–1907) and his wife Ieva (1858–1922). She belonged to a new generation of Latvian women who sought professional artistic education at the turn of the 20th century.

She began her studies at Benjamin Blum's art school in Riga before moving to Saint Petersburg, where she furthered her training at the Drawing School of the Imperial Society for the Encouragement of the Arts under the tutelage of Nicholas Roerich. She also undertook several study trips to France and Germany.

=== Revolutionary activity ===
In addition to her artistic practice, Leščinska was also involved in the Russian Revolution of 1905. Supported by her father, she operated a safe house for revolutionaries in Riga, acted as a courier and distributed illegal political literature. Through her lifelong partner, the professional revolutionary Kristaps Salniņš, she was closely associated with the group of Latvian bolshevik revolutionaries who committed the infamous 1906 Helsinki bank robbery in Finland. The subsequent police crackdown forced her and Salniņš into exile in England.

=== Later career and death ===
Leščinska returned to Russia from exile in the 1910s. Between 1917 and 1920, amidst the chaos of the Russian Revolution and First World War, she lived in the Siberian city of Tyumen, where she worked as a governess. In 1920, following the independence of Latvia, she resettled permanently in Riga. She shifted her artistic focus toward applied arts and graphics, collaborating closely with artist Zelma Skrābāne at her prominent art gallery in central Riga.

On 29 August 1923, while on a summer vacation in Finland, Leščinska drowned in the Imatrankoski rapids. The exact circumstances of her death remain unexplained. Her remains were buried in Riga in August 1924.

== Legacy ==
Long obscured in public memory, her life and artistic contributions were re-evaluated in 2022 with the publication of the comprehensive biographical monograph Tija. Māksla, revolūcija, mīlestība (Tija. Art, Revolution, Love), written by her niece, the art historian and critic Silvija Freinberga, and published by the Neputns Publishing House.
