= Eef Arnolds =

Dutch botanist and mycologist (born 1948)

Everhardus Johannes Maria Arnolds (born April 16, 1948, The Hague) is a Dutch mycologist, lichenologist, and plant collector.

== Education and Career ==
In 1981, he obtained his PhD from the University of Utrecht, on a thesis on taxonomy, ecology, and geographical distribution of macrofungi in grasslands in Drenthe.

He was a research assistant at Wageningen University. From 1990 to 1998, he was director of the Wijster Biological Station.
