= Daina Dagnija =

Latvian painter, textile artist, and teacher (1937–2019)

- Daina Dagnija
- Born: 15 March 1937; Riga, Latvia
- Died: 4 December 2019 (aged 82)
- Known for: Painting, Textile arts
- Movement: Modernism, Abstract expressionism

Daina Dagnija (15 March 1937 – 4 December 2019) was a Latvian painter, textile artist and teacher. She was a significant personality in the context of both Latvian and world visual art, as the artist spent part of her creative life in the USA.

== Biography ==
Daina Dagnija was born in the family of a Latvian army officer, in 1944 she fled first to Germany and later moved to the USA. Daina Dagnija learned the basics of visual art at the Art Students League of New York (New York, USA, 1954–1956). Studied at the School of Arts and Crafts (now the College for Creative Studies, Detroit, USA, 1956–1959), the Shawnar Institute (now the California Institute of the Arts, Los Angeles, USA, 1960). The artist taught art pedagogy at the Art School (Demarest, USA, 1995–2001). Member of the Artists Union of Latvia since 1996.

Since 1968, Daina Dagnija has participated in exhibitions with her creative works: in the US, Latvia, Lithuania, Morocco, Canada. In Latvia, the artist's most important exhibitions took place at the Latvian National Museum of Art (2004, catalog), Jurmala City Museum (2012) and Daugavpils Mark Rothko Art Centre (2015, catalog). In 2001, she returned to live in Latvia. She died on 4 December 2019 at the age of 82.

== Artistic career ==
In both Dagnija's paintings and drawings, the centre is a person in various life events and relationships. In monochrome drawings, the message is direct and close to realism. The paintings are characterized by the modelling of plane shapes, intense coloured objects, sharp contours, which echo the direction of pop art in their external features. Dagnija's paintings directly or indirectly express the experiences of the artist, at the same time striving for the universal. She has devoted a lot of work to the topic of Latvia and the Latvian people. She had created extensive painting cycles ("Woman and Cow", "Kritušais"). She made painterly textile collages with an original character on the background of an unreal environment. She also turned to monumental art (mural painting in Bergen Pines hospital in Paramus, New Jersey).

In 1974, Dagnija won the award of the General Kārlis Goppers fund for the series of large-format paintings "Latvian Life". She repeatedly received the New Jersey state scholarship in painting: in 1980 for the series of three large-format paintings "Return to Childhood", in 1985 for the completion of the series of paintings "Woman and Cow".

Daina Dagnija has devoted her whole life to art. In 2018, when "MuseumLV" opened her personal exhibition "Life for art. Art for life", the artist said that even at the age of 81 she still painted almost every day.

== Selected works ==
Figurative paintings:

- Woman and Cow, 1982–1985
- Women, 1967–2008
- America, 1966–1981
- Refugees, 1976–1992
- Okinawa period, 1962–1971

Paintings:

- Forward, 2017
- Growing and Glowing, 2013–2017
- Creation and Evolution, 1985–2013
- Forces of Nature, 1996–2013
- Ancestor Lakes, 1987–1995

== Solo exhibitions ==
- "Always on the Road" exhibition at Gulbene Museum in Gulbene, Latvia. 2016
- Mark Rothko Art Centre (Daugavpils, Latvia). 2015
- Textile collage exhibition at Bauska Museum in Bauska, Latvia. 2015

She had held 30 personal exhibitions in the US, Latvia, and Morocco. Participated in several group exhibitions at the New York Museum of Art, New Jersey State Museum, Bergen Museum of Art and Science in Paramus, P.S.1 Institute of Contemporary Art in New York, as well as galleries in New York, New Jersey, Juan Mexico, Canada, in Lithuania, Estonia.

== Awards ==
- VKKF Lifetime Scholarship (2015)
- LR Ministry of Culture scholarship Cité Internationale des Arts, artists' residence, France (2009)
- Participation in the "Art Embassies" program in the US, Washington (1999 - 2001)
- Honorary Award in visual arts of the Culture Foundation of the World Union of Free Latvians (1993)
- New Jersey State, USA, scholarship in painting (1985)
- Summits, USA, prize in painting (1983)
- New Jersey State, USA, scholarship in painting (1980)
- General Kārlis Goppers Fund Award in Visual Arts (1974)
