= Augusts Annuss =

Latvian painter (1893–1984)

- Born: 27 October 1893; Liepāja, Latvia
- Died: 5 January 1984 (aged 90); New York, New York, United States
- Occupation: Painter

Augusts Annuss (27 October 1893 – 5 January 1984) was a Latvian painter. His work was part of the painting event in the art competition at the 1936 Summer Olympics.
