= Lilija Dinere =

Latvian painter (born 1955)

- Born: 1955; Riga, Latvian SSR
- Known for: Painting

Lilija Dinere (Latvian: Lilija Dinere, 1955, Riga) is a Latvian painter and book illustrator.

== Biography ==
Born in Riga, Dinere graduated from the painting – stage design department of the Latvian Academy of Art in 1980. She has illustrated more than 50 books, and has participated in exhibitions in Latvia and abroad, especially Germany. Dinere's works are held in the Latvian National Museum of Art, Artists Union collection, the A. Pushkin State Museum of Visual Art, the State Tretyakov Gallery in Moscow, the Frauen Museum in Bonn, the Gottland Museum of Art in Visby (Sweden) as well as in private collections worldwide.

== Selected illustrated books ==
- 1980 - P.J. Beranger „Chansons”
- 1984 - Maurice Carême „L'Arlequin de la Lune”
- 1987 – François Villon „Poesies Completes”
- 1990 - Lars Gyllensten „Three Novels”
- 1990 - Cecilija Dinere „Poetry”
- 1993, 1994, 1995 - „Dede Korkud” (ancient Turkish Epos)
- 1993 - Lord Byron „Hebrew Melodies”
- 1995 - „Celtic Myths”
- 1997 - „Book of Job” (Old Testament)
- 1999, 2000 - „Latvian Anthology of Love Poems” I, II volumes
- 2005. – “Psalms”, (Old Testament)
- 2010 – "Song of Roland", (French: La Chanson de Roland, Old French Epos), illustrated together with Roberts Diners
