= Vilhelms Purvītis =

Latvian painter

- Born: 3 March 1872; Zaube, Kreis Riga, Governorate of Livonia, Russian Empire
- Died: 14 January 1945 (aged 72); Bad Nauheim, Third Reich
- Education: Member Academy of Arts (1913)
- Alma mater: Higher Art School (1895)
- Known for: Painting
- Movement: Impressionism

Vilhelms Purvītis (3 March 1872 – 14 January 1945) was a landscape painter and educator who founded the Latvian Academy of Art and was its rector from 1919 to 1934.

== Biography ==
Vilhems Purvītis was born in Zaube Parish (now Cēsis Municipality), Kreis Riga, in the Governorate of Livonia in a family of a miller. He studied in a local parish school until his family moved to Vitebsk Governorate. Until 1888 Purvītis studied in a municipal school in Drissa (Today: Belarus) where his drawing skills were noticed for the first time. When his family returned to Vidzeme Purvītis worked in his father's mill in Smiltene parish for two years.

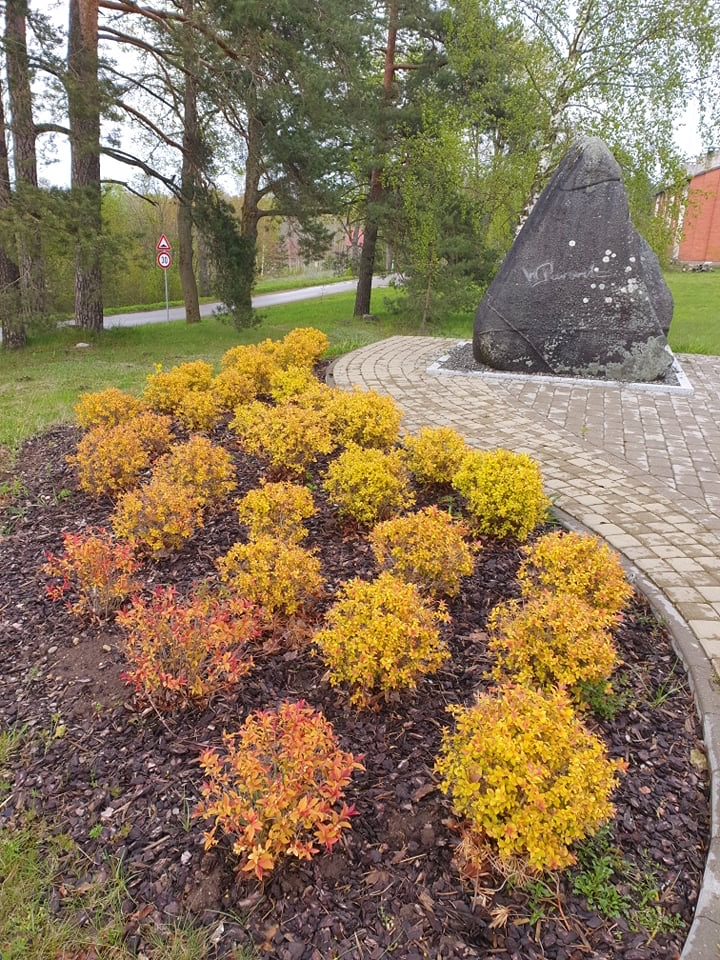
Memorial stone in Smiltene parish

In 1890 Purvītis started studies at the Imperial Academy of Arts in Saint Petersburg, Russia from 1890 to 1897, primarily under Arkhip Kuindzhi, graduating with the Grand Gold Medal. While in the academy he studied paintings of old Dutch masters and became close friends with two other Latvian painters- Janis Rozentāls and Johan Valter. In 1898, Purvītis, Rozentāls, and Valter took a study trip across Europe, and his paintings were exhibited in Berlin, Munich, Paris, and Lyon to great acclaim. In 1899 he returned to Riga and started to give private lessons in painting. In 1902 he traveled to Spitzbergen in Norway to study the painting of snow.

After the Revolution of 1905 Purvītis traveled to Tallinn where he worked as a drawing teacher in a local Realschule. In 1909 Purvītis returned to Riga and became director of a Riga City Art School.

After the First World War started in 1915, Riga city art school was evacuated to St. Petersburg where it was closed in 1916. After the Russian revolutions of 1917 Purvītis went to Norway to improve his health and held his first solo exhibition in Oslo.

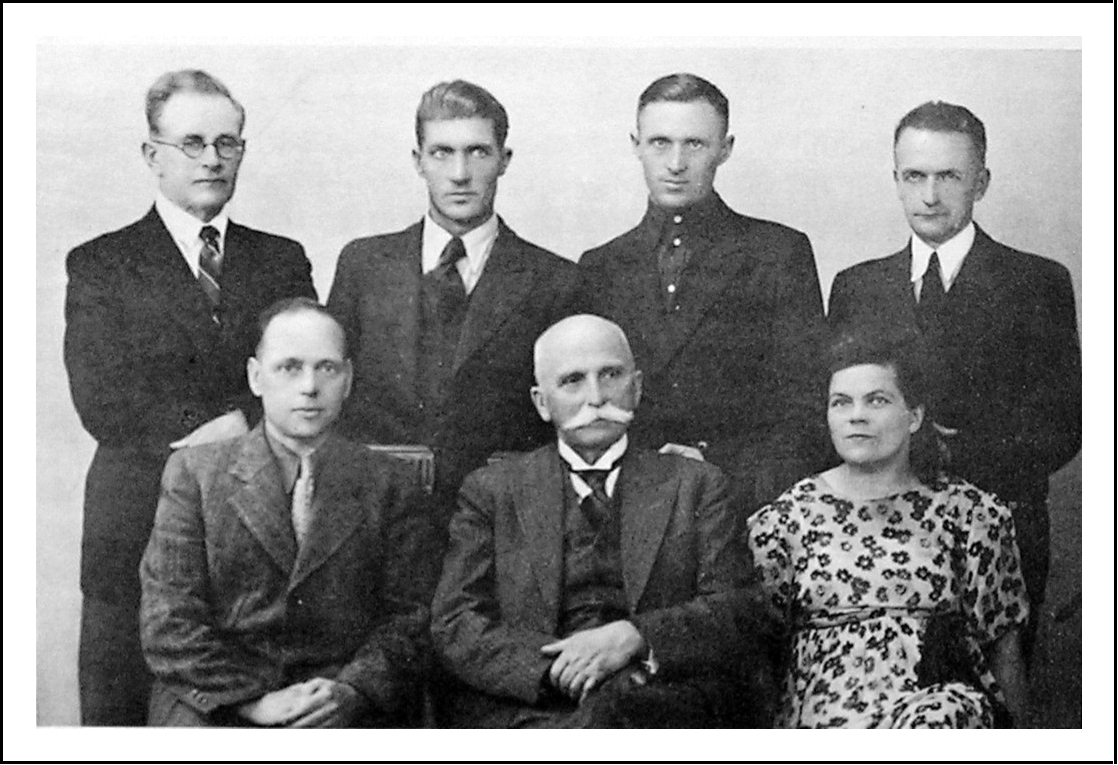
Master Class in Landscape Painting at the Latvian Art Academy, 1942. Seated in the middle is Professor Vilhelms Purvītis

In 1918 Purvītis returned to German-occupied Riga. In 1919 he became director of a Riga city art museum (Today: Latvian National Museum of Art) and also was one of the founders of the Art Academy of Latvia and was elected as its first rector. As the leader of the landscape painting workshop at the Latvian Academy of Art from 1921 to 1944, of visual arts in the architecture department at the University of Latvia from 1919 to 1940, and director of the Riga City Art School from 1909 to 1915, Purvītis had a host of followers and was the acknowledged leader of a whole school of Latvian painting.

During the period of the Republic of Latvia Purvītis also organized many exhibitions of Latvian art in Europe.

After the Soviet occupation of Latvia in 1940 Purvītis was dismissed from the post of museum director but continued to work in the Art Academy. In 1942 his last exhibition in Riga was held.

In 1944 Purvītis lost all of his belongings and many of his works when his house and workshop were destroyed during the Battle of Jelgava in the summer of 1944. Purvītis was forced to evacuate to Liepāja and from there to Danzig.

Purvītis died on 14 January 1945 in Bad Nauheim, Hessen. Purvītis' remains were reinterred at the Riga Forest Cemetery in 1994 after Latvia regained its independence. He was awarded the Order of three stars (III and II class) and many more decorations.

Constantly experimenting and becoming a master of snow scenes, Purvītis began as a Realist painter, turned to Impressionism, and was later influenced by Cézanne and Munch. His painting Winter (1910) also suggests the influence of Art Nouveau. He is considered one of the greatest Latvian painters during the first half of the 20th century. His landscapes are full of local motives and Latvian nature is portrayed in the neo-romantic atmosphere. During his lifetime he produced more than a thousand paintings and drawings and many of them were never exhibited because he preferred to collect them in his apartment.

Vilhelms Purvītis's works

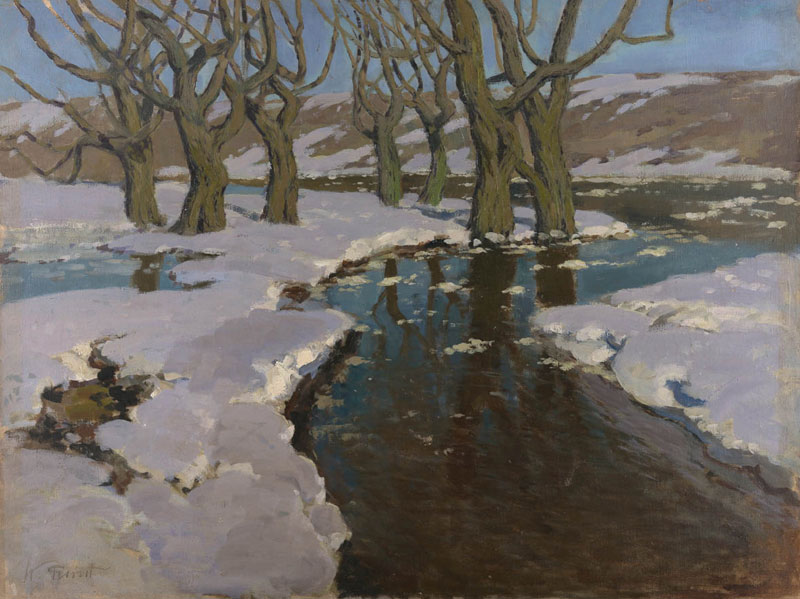
Early Spring (1898-1899)

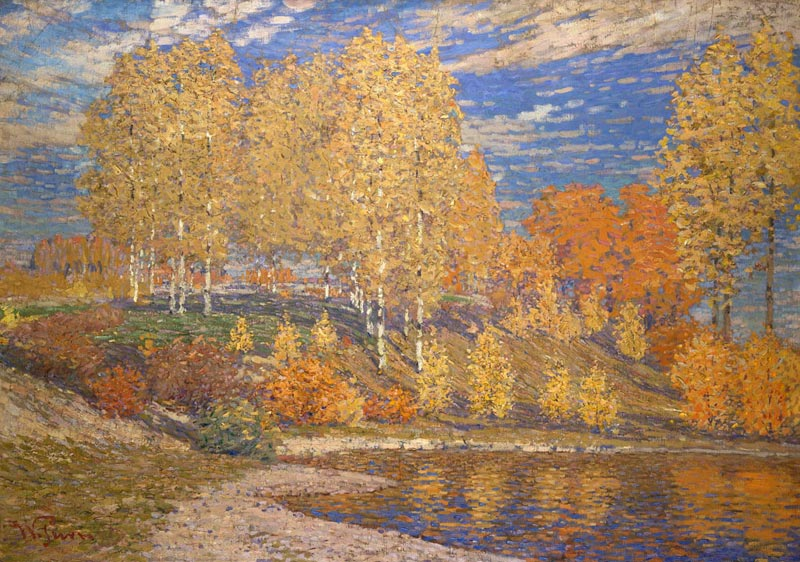
Autumn Sun (1909)

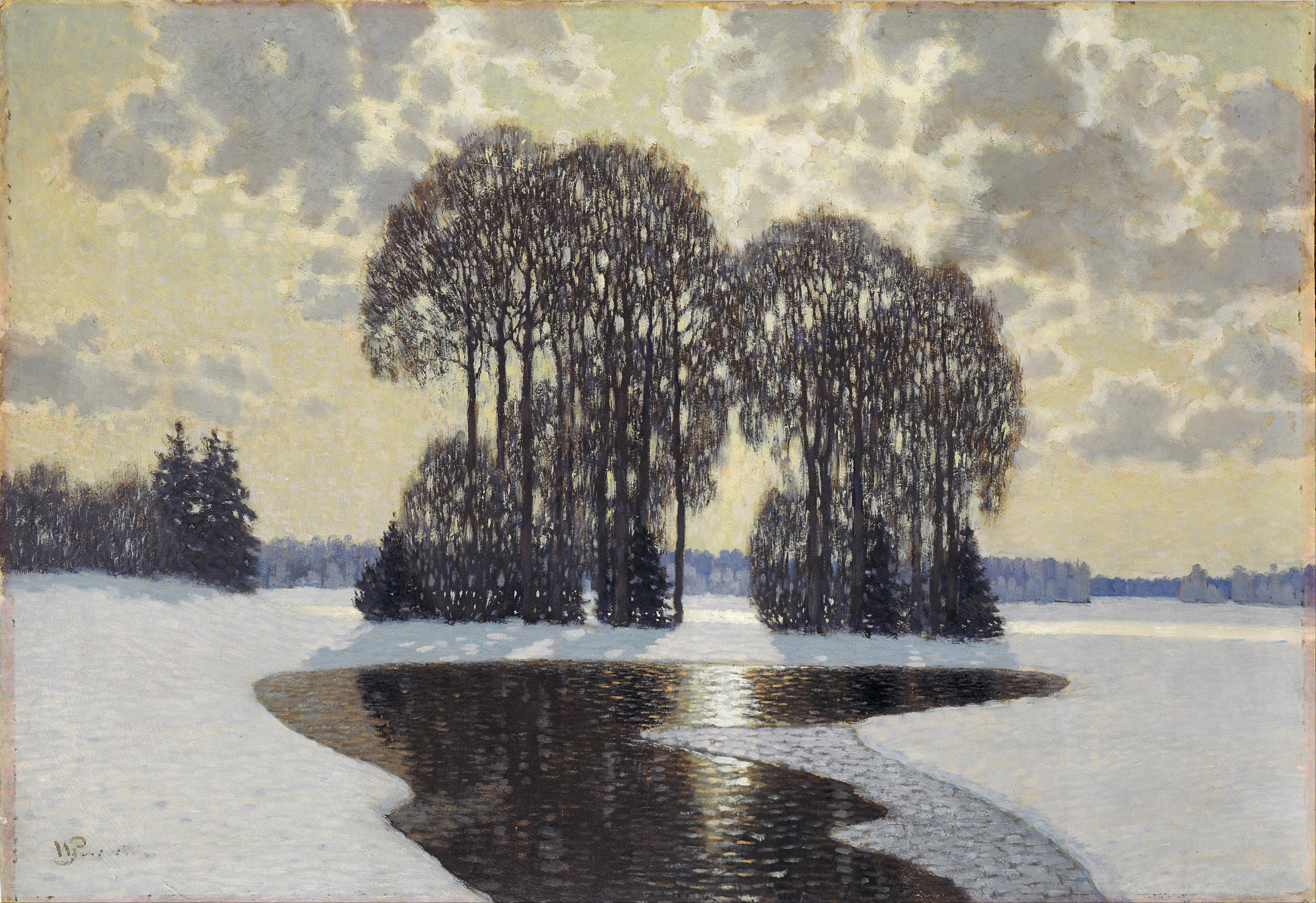
Winter (1910)

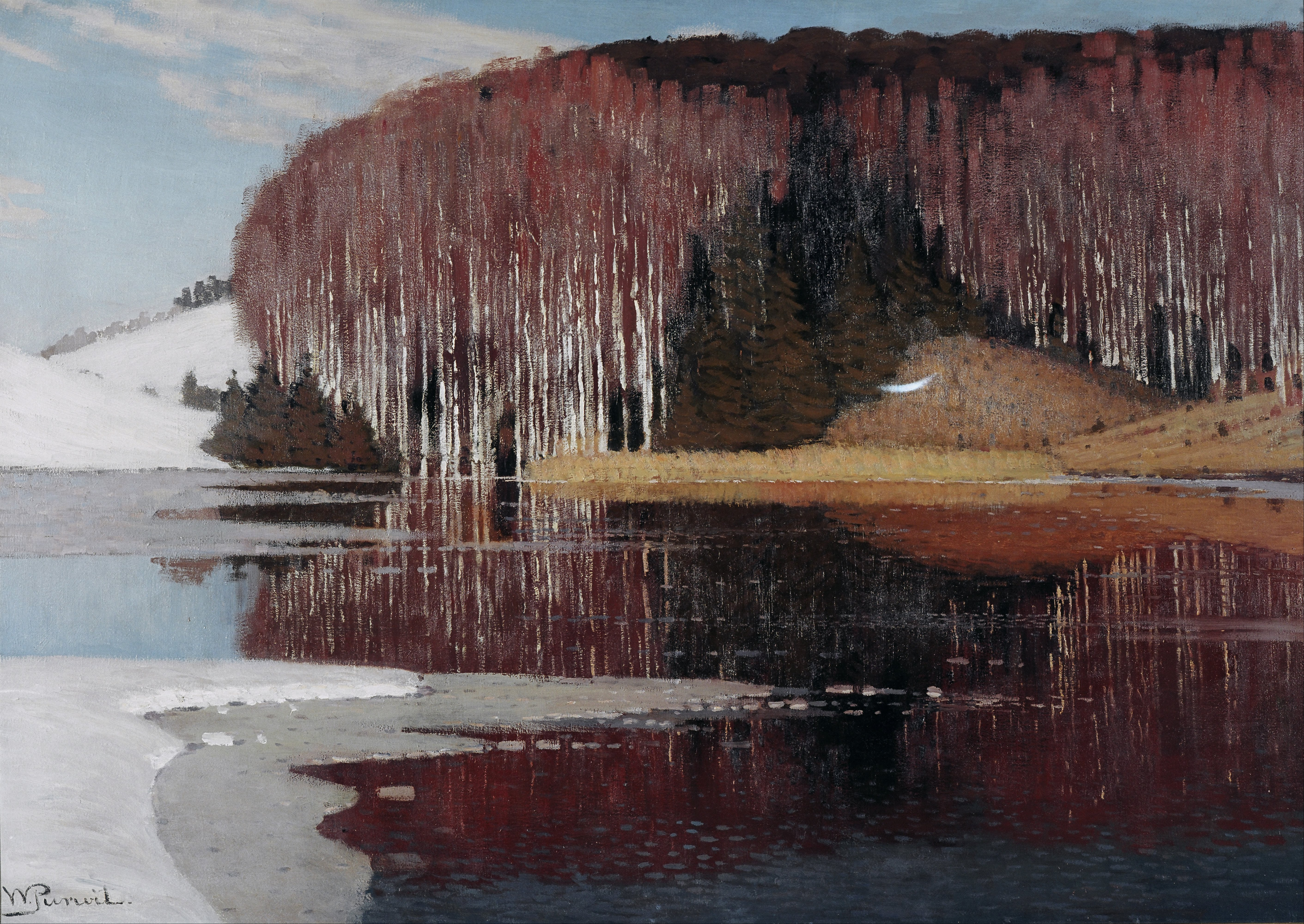
Spring Waters (1910)

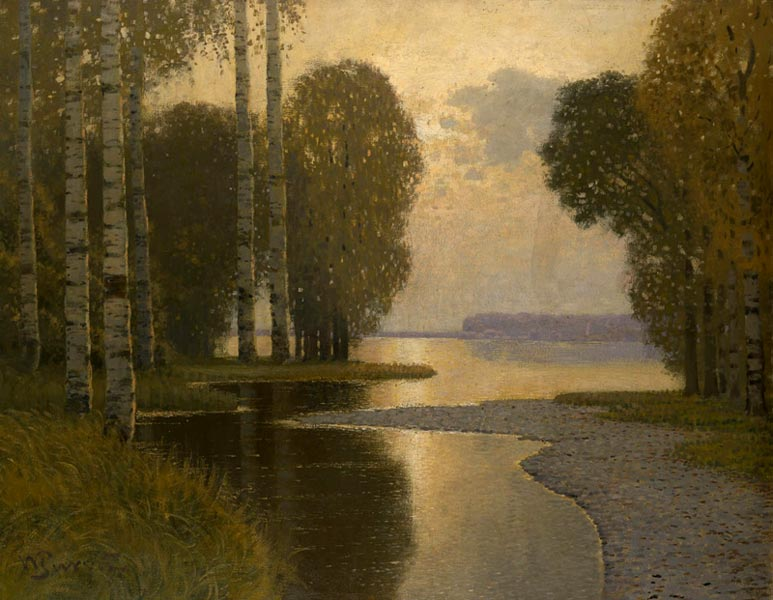
Landscape with Birch trees (1910)

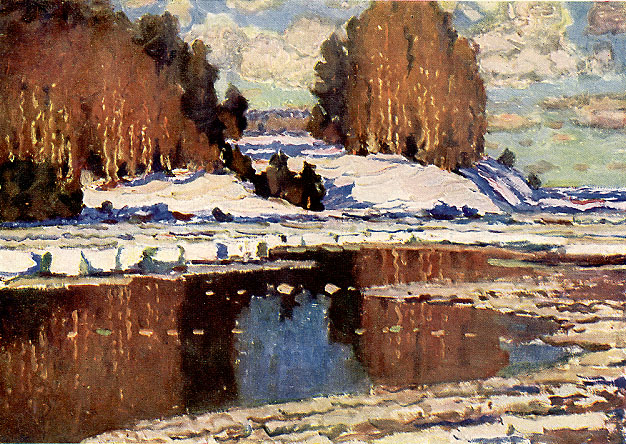
Pavasaris (1930)

== Sources ==
- Apinis, Pēteris (2006). A Hundred Great Latvians. Riga: Nacionālais apgāds. p. 64. ISBN 9984-26-288-X. OCLC 238892134.
