= Janis Rozentāls Art High School =

Art school in Riga, Latvia

Coordinates: 56°57′6.5″N 24°4′11.1″E

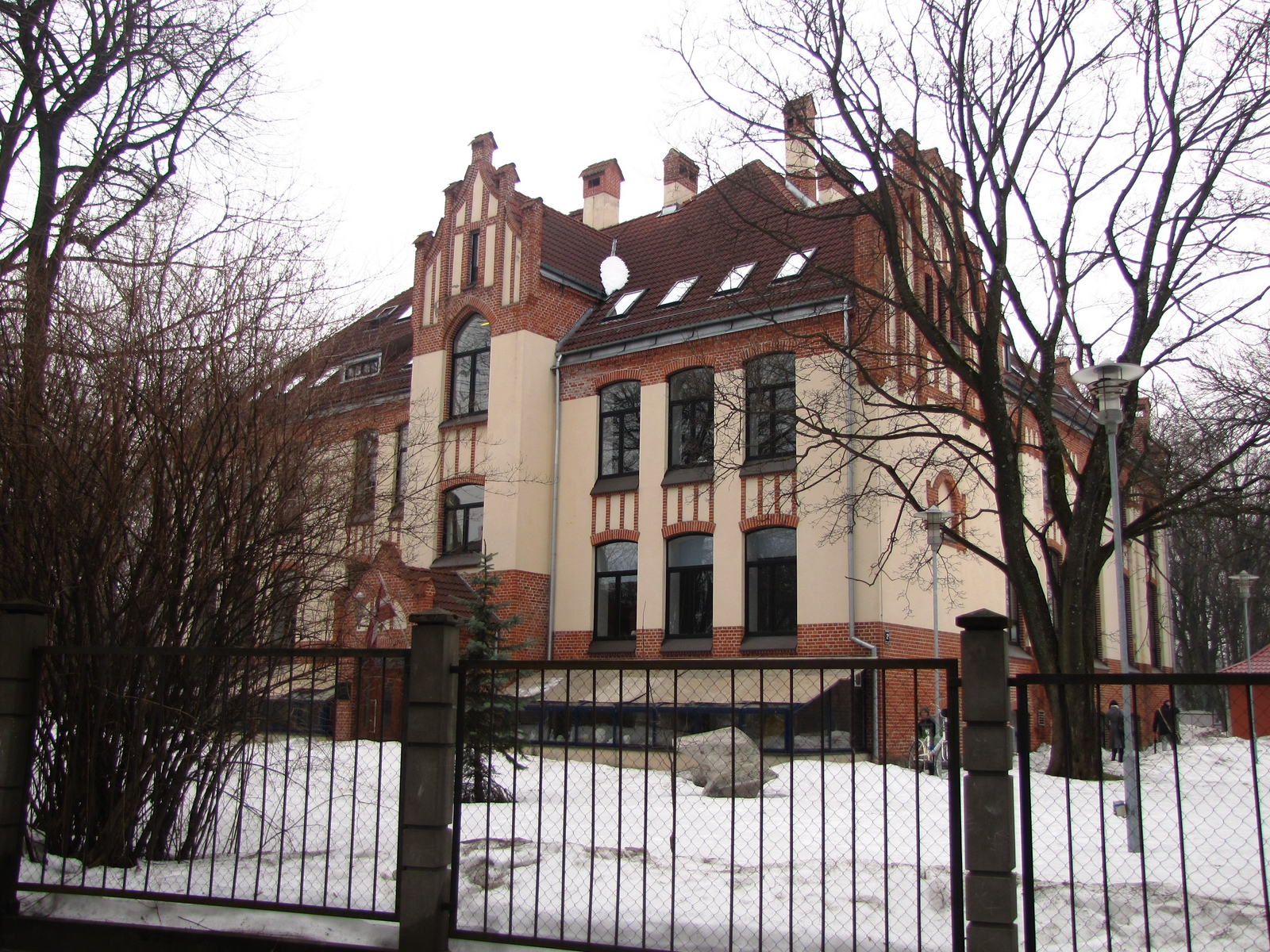
Janis Rozentāls Art School

The Janis Rozentāls Art School (Latvian: Jaņa Rozentāla Mākslas skola, JRMS) is a Latvian art school teaching the academic arts of drawing, painting and composition — as well as graphics and design.

The art high school has its beginning in 1895, when the Latvian Painters Society established a painter's school. In 1928 the school changed its name to Latvian Painters Crafts Promotion and Relief Society Vocational School (Latvian: Latvijas daiļkrāsotāju amatniecības veicināšanas un palīdzības biedrības aroda skola), which again was changed in 1944 to Riga Secondary School of Art (Latvian: Rīgas Mākslas vidusskola), in 1946 to Janis Rozentāls Art High School, in 1998 to Janis Rozentāls Art College (Latvian: Jaņa Rozentāla Rīgas Mākslas koledža), on 18 March 2002 to Janis Rozentāls Riga Art High School (Latvian: Jaņa Rozentāla Rīgas Mākslas vidusskola).
