= Art Academy of Latvia =

Art school in Riga, Latvia

Coordinates: 56.9547106°N 24.1109562°E

- Latvijas Mākslas akadēmija
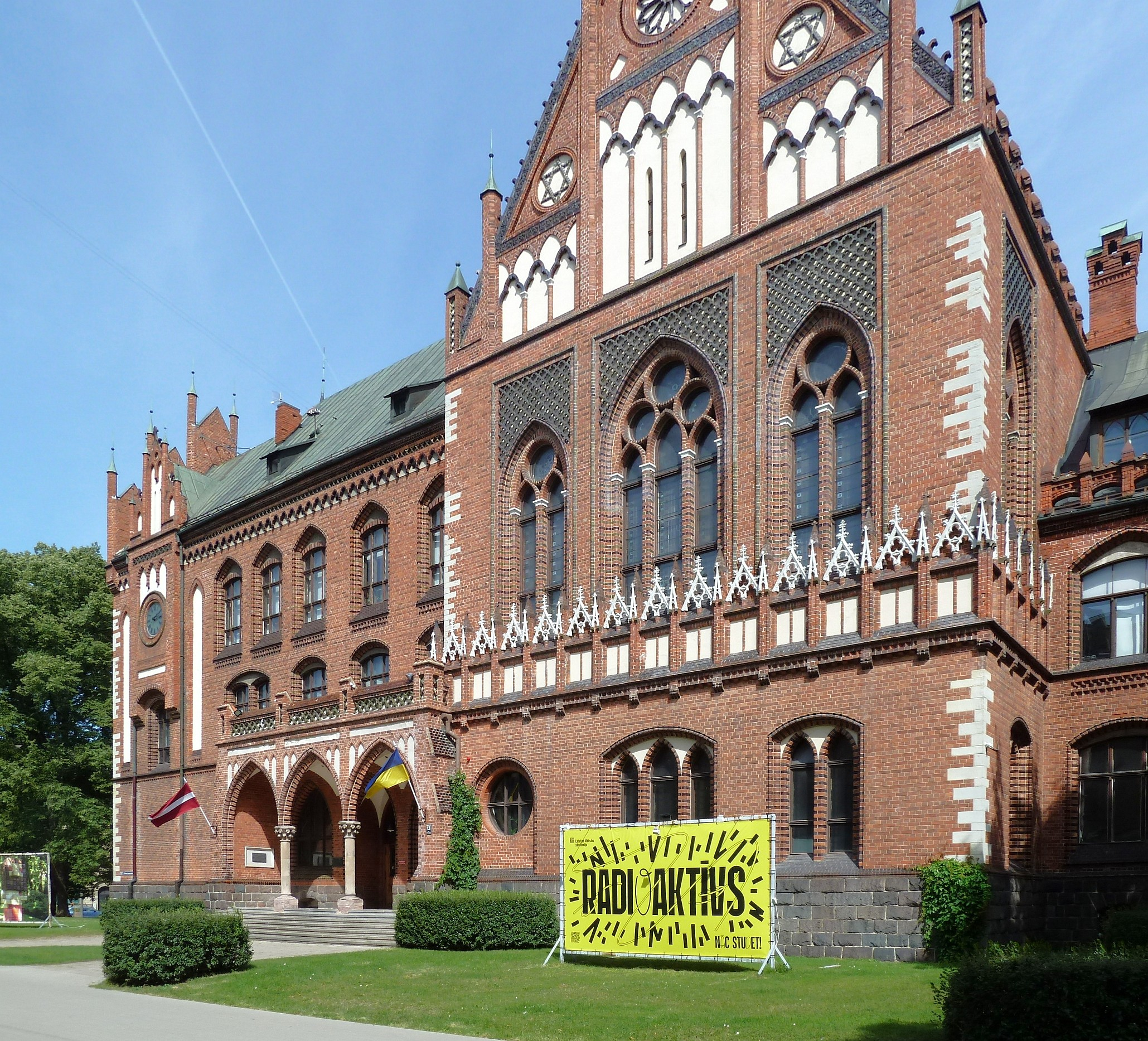
- Main building
- Established: 1919; 107 years ago
- Rector: Kristaps Zariņš
- Location: 13 Kalpaka Boulevard, LV-1050, Riga, Latvia
- Website: https://www.lma.lv/en
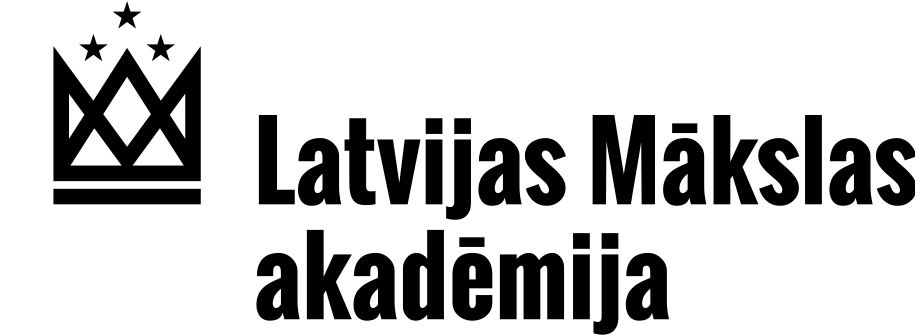

The Art Academy of Latvia (Latvian: Latvijas Mākslas akadēmija) is an art school located in Riga, Latvia. It was founded in 1919 by Vilhelms Purvītis and began teaching in 1921. Its main building is a neo-Gothic brick building at 13 Kalpaka Boulevard, near the Latvian National Museum of Art.

== History ==
=== Building ===
The academy's main building was designed by architect Wilhelm Bockslaff and built between 1902 and 1905 for the Riga Stock Exchange Commercial School. Sculptor August Volz created the sandstone column capitals and other sculptural decoration. The interior has Art Nouveau stained-glass windows made in Ernst Tode's workshop. The academy moved into the building in 1940.

=== Foundation and early years ===
On 4 May 1919, the Soviet Latvian government announced plans for a proletarian art workshop, but it never opened. The Provisional Government of Latvia established the academy on 20 August 1919, with Vilhelms Purvītis as its first rector. Teaching began on 12 October 1921.

The early teaching staff included Purvītis, Rihards Zariņš and Jānis Kuga. The academy first occupied premises on Kronvalda Boulevard, then moved to the Railway Administration building in 1922. Its first constitution (Satversme) was adopted by the Saeima on 7 February 1924 and proclaimed by President Jānis Čakste. Between 1921 and 1940, the academy awarded diplomas to 219 artists.

=== Occupation periods ===
Following the Soviet occupation of Latvia in 1940, the institution was renamed the State Art Academy. In 1944, it became the State Art Academy of the Latvian SSR. During the Soviet era, it came under several state bodies, including the Ministry of Culture and committees responsible for higher education.

From 1973 to 1988, it was named the Teodors Zaļkalns State Art Academy of the Latvian SSR, after the sculptor and former faculty member Teodors Zaļkalns. Its original name, Art Academy of Latvia, was restored in 1988.

== Organization ==
=== Faculties ===
The Academy has 5 faculties:

- Faculty of Visual Arts (2D)

- Department of Painting
- Department of Graphic Art
- Department of Textile Art
- Department of Drawing

- Faculty of Visual Plastic Arts (3D)

- Department of Sculpture
- Department of Ceramics
- Department of Glass Art

- Faculty of Design

- Department of Functional Design
- Department of Environmental Art
- Department of Metal Design
- Department of Fashion Design

- Faculty of Audio-Visual Media Art

- Department of Visual Communication
- Department of Motion, Image, and Sound
- Department of Stage Design

- Faculty of Art History

- Department of Art History and Theory
- Department of Restoration
- Department of Humanities

=== Latgale Branch ===
The academy has a branch in Latgale located in Rēzekne.

== Notable alumni ==
- Arturs Akopjans – figurative and abstract artist
- Ansis Artums – landscape painter
- Lidija Auza – assemblage and abstract artist
- Biruta Baumane – 2002 winner of the Baltic Assembly Prize for Literature, the Arts and Science
- Anšlavs Eglītis – novelist and author of short stories
- Sandra Kalniete – Minister of Foreign Affairs, European Commissioner and Member of the European Parliament
- Gunārs Lūsis – graphic designer who, along with Jānis Strupulis, designed the post-Soviet lat coin
- Ludmilla Meilerts – landscape painter
- Kārlis Padegs – expressionist painter
- Ināra Tetereva – philanthropist behind the Boris and Ināra Teterev fund, a Latvian patron of the arts
- Ēvī Upeniece – sculptor

== Gallery ==
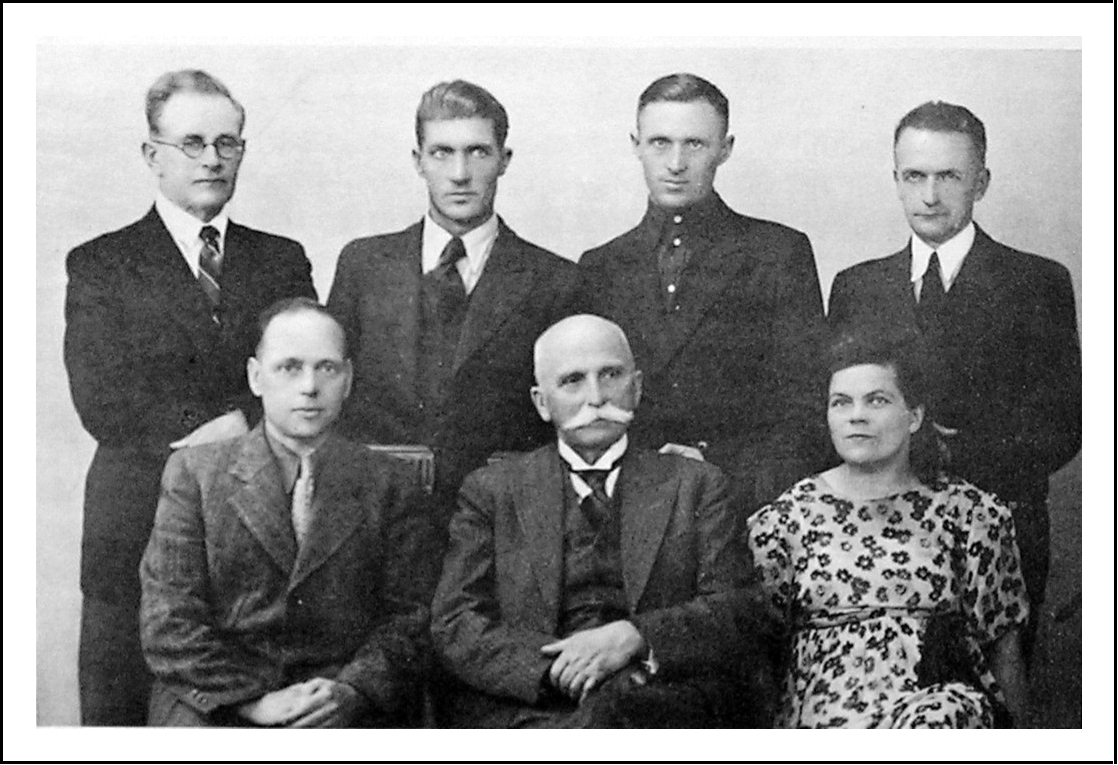
Graduation photo of the Landscape Workshop in 1942. Seated in the middle of the front row is Professor Vilhelms Purvītis. To the left of him is Mārtiņš Krūmiņš.

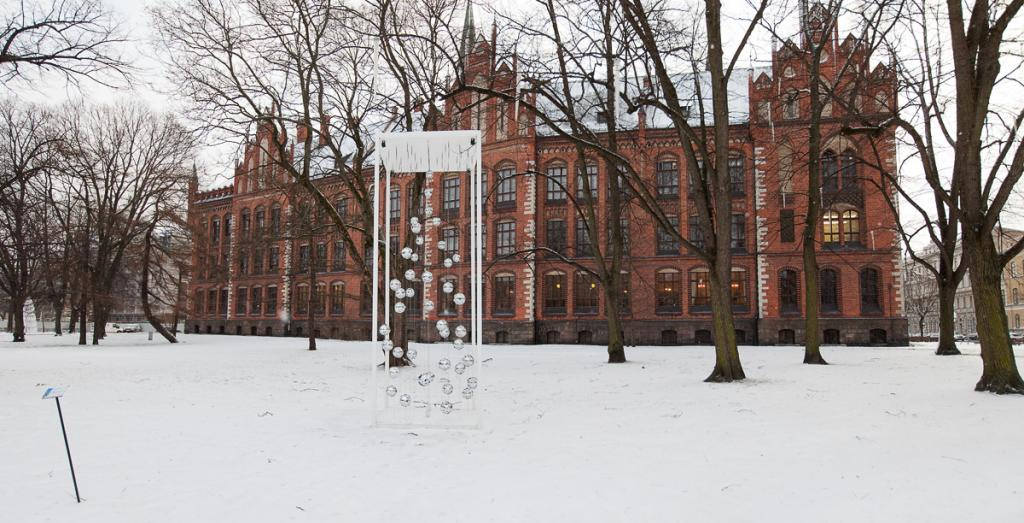
Daina Skadmane's art installation "Vēja egle" next to the Art Academy of Latvia, Riga 2015.
