= List of painters from Latvia =

This is a list of notable painters from, or associated with, Latvia.

== A ==
- Ādams Alksnis (1864–1897)
- Arturs Akopjans (born 1969)

== B ==
- Auseklis Baušķenieks (1910–2007)
- Biruta Baumane (1922–2017)
- Johann Heinrich Baumann (1753–1832)
- Aleksandra Belcova (1892–1981)
- Boriss Berziņš (1930–2002)

== C ==
- Vija Celmins (born 1939)

== D ==
- Jonas Damelis (1780–1840)
- Lilija Dinere (born 1955)
- Aleksandr Drevin (1889–1938)

== G ==
- Jazeps Grosvalds (1891–1920)
- Hugo Kārlis Grotuss (1884–1951)

== H ==
- Kārlis Hūns (1831–1877)

== K ==
- Ingrīda Kadaka (born 1967)
- Jānis Kalmīte (1907–1996)
- Jēkabs Kazaks (1895–1920)
- Mārtiņš Krūmiņš (1900–1992)

== L ==
- André Lapine (1866–1952)
- Ludolfs Liberts (1895–1959)
- Jānis Liepiņš (1894–1964)

== M ==
- Arnolds Mazītis (1913–2002)
- Leo Michelson (1887–1978)

== P ==
- Kārlis Padegs (1911–1940)
- Tatyana Palchuk (born 1954)
- Lucia Peka (1912–1991)
- Rūdolfs Pērle (1875–1917)
- Jāzeps Pīgoznis (1934–2014)
- Miervaldis Polis (born 1948)
- Līga Purmale (born 1948)
- Vilhelms Purvītis (1872–1945)

== R ==
- Rudolf Ray Rapaport (1891–1984)
- Mark Rothko (1903–1970)
- Janis Rozentāls (1866–1916)
- Francis Rudolph (1921–2005)

== S ==
- Anda Skadmane (born 1990)
- Džemma Skulme (1925–2019)
- Uga Skulme (1895–1963)
- Maurice Sterne (1878–1957)

== T ==
- Jānis Tilbergs (1880–1972)

== U ==
- Konrāds Ubāns (1893–1981)
- Teodors Ūders (1868–1915)

== V ==
- Edgars Vinters (1919–2014)

== W ==
- Zanis Waldheims (1909–1993)

== Z ==
- Ilgvars Zalans (born 1962)

== See also ==
- List of Latvian artists
- Culture of Latvia
