= List of Latvian artists =

This is a chronological list of Latvian artists working in visual media who were born or whose creative production is associated with Latvia:

- Elise von Jung-Stilling (1829-1904) Painter, founder of a private painting school in Riga
- Kārlis Hūns (1831-1877) Painter
- Ādams Alksnis (1864-1897) Painter
- Vilhelms Purvītis (1872-1945) Painter, Founder of the Latvian Academy of the Arts
- Emīlija Gruzīte (1873-1945) Painter
- Maurice Sterne (1878-1957) Painter
- Hugo Kārlis Grotuss (1884-1969) Painter
- Frédéric Fiebig (1885-1953) Painter
- Leo Michelson (1887-1978) Painter
- Jazeps Grosvalds (1891-1969) Painter
- Aleksandra Belcova (1892-1981) Painter
- Arvīds Brastiņš (1893-1984) Sculptor
- Jēkabs Bīne (1895-1955) Painter and stained glass artist
- Uga Skulme (1895-1963) Painter
- Jēkabs Kazaks (1895-1920) Painter
- Romans Suta (1896-1944) Painter, graphic artist, stage designer and art theoretician
- Hilda Vīka (1897-1963) Painter and illustrator
- Julius Matisons (1898-1978) Painter
- Mark Rothko (1903-1970) Painter
- Philippe Halsman (1906-1979) Photographer
- Lucia Peka (1912-1991) Painter
- Arnold Mikelson (1922-1984) Wood sculptor
- Aina Apse (1926–2015) Potter
- Vija Celmins (born 1939) Painter
- Tatyana Palchuk (born 1954) Painter
- Nele Zirnite (born 1959) Printmaker
- Ilgvars Zalans (born 1962) Painter, action painting performer
- Arturs Akopjans (born 1969) Painter

== See also ==
- List of painters from Latvia
- List of Latvian sculptors
- Culture of Latvia
