= Latvian diaspora =

Community of Latvian emigrants

Map of the Latvian diaspora. Latvia + 100,000 + 10,000 + 1,000

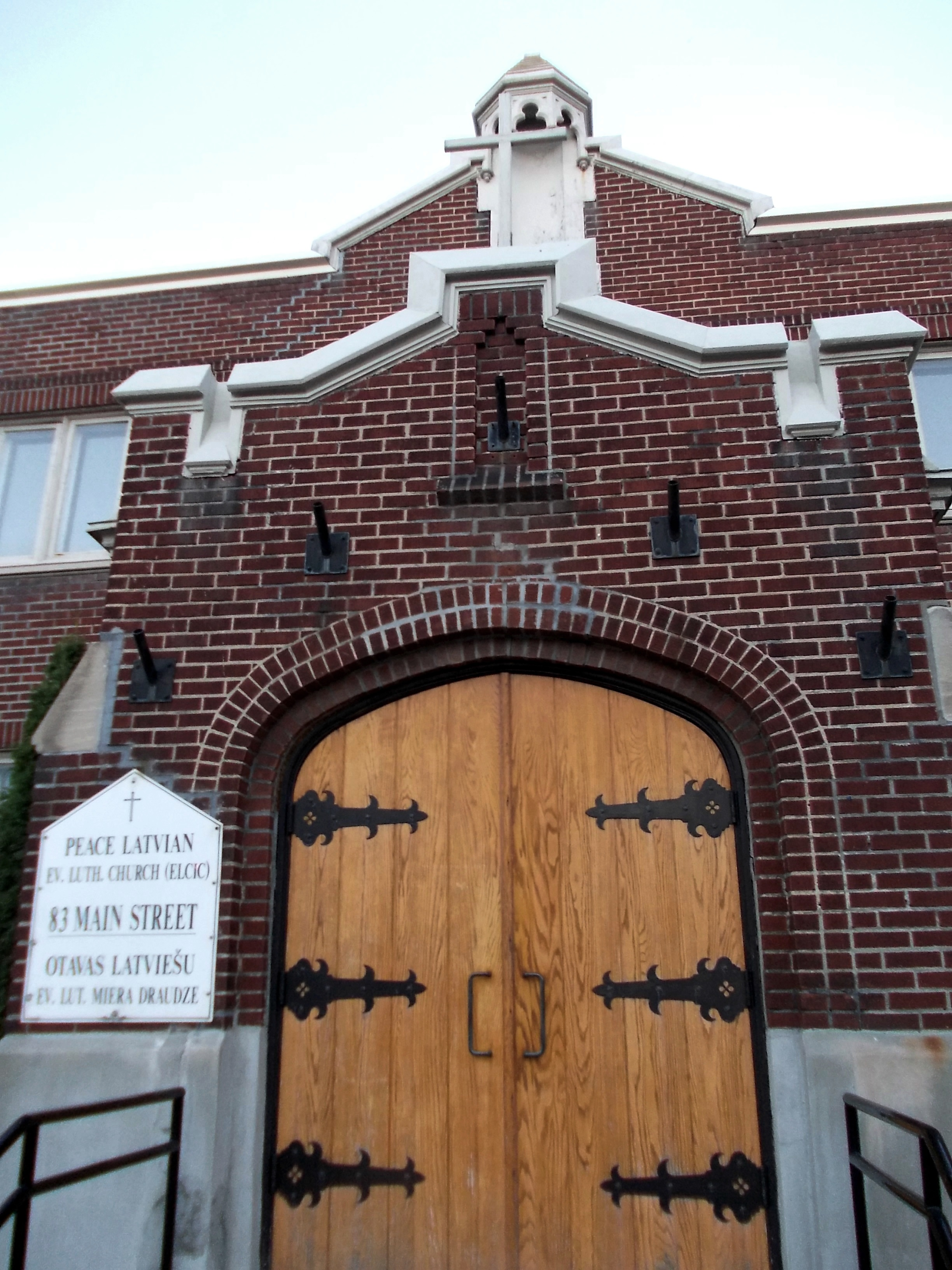
Latvian Lutheran church in Ottawa, Canada

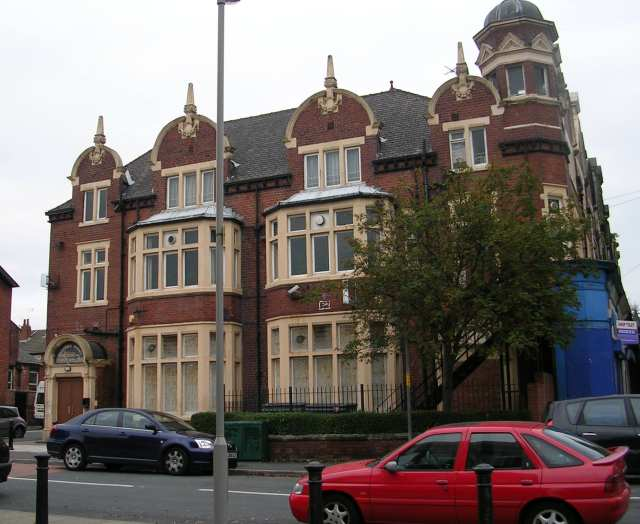
A Latvian social club in Leeds, England

The Latvian diaspora refers to Latvians and people of Latvian descent residing outside Latvia.

According to estimates by the Latvian Foreign Ministry, as at 2012, about 370,000 Latvian citizens permanently resided outside of Latvia, most of them having emigrated in the preceding decade. The largest Latvian communities are in the United Kingdom, the United States, Canada, Ireland, Sweden, Australia, New Zealand, Russia, Brazil, Belgium, Israel, Norway, Finland, Spain and Portugal.

== History ==
=== Late 19th century and early 20th century ===
While Latvia was part of the Russian Empire, many Latvians left to other regions of Russia (for instance, Bashkiria) looking for opportunities to farm, as well as for Latin America and Australia. The next large wave of emigration was related to World War I, when thousands of refugees and evacuated factory workers moved to other regions of Russia. Many of the refugees returned after Latvia became independent, others formed communities in Russia, Ukraine and the Caucasus. A significant number of Latvians from the ranks of the Bolshevik Latvian Riflemen occupied senior positions in the early Soviet Russia and Soviet Union.

=== After World War II ===
A large wave of emigration from Latvia followed the Soviet and Nazi German occupations of the country during World War II.

More than 200,000 Latvian citizens died during World War II and the occupations, and thousands of Latvians fled the country. The largest communities of Latvians were established in the United States, Canada, Sweden, Great Britain and Australia. The Latvian diaspora in the West actively worked for the restoration of Latvia's independence. The Latvian diplomatic service in exile represented the interests of independent Latvia in the Free World during the Soviet and Nazi occupations.

During the period that Latvia was under Soviet rule (until 1991), around 60,000 inhabitants of Latvia were deported to remote areas of the Soviet Union. Simultaneously, Latvians migrated from the Latvian SSR to other Soviet Republics. A number of Latvian Jews emigrated to Israel and the United States.

=== After 2004 ===
Following the 2004 accession of Latvia to the European Union and the 2008 financial crisis, as many as 200,000 Latvians left the country. In the United Kingdom, the 2011 UK Census already recorded 53,977 Latvian-born residents in England, 692 in Wales, 4,475 in Scotland, and 2,297 in Northern Ireland. In 2021, there were approximately 90,000 Latvian nationals estimated to be residing in the United Kingdom. The highest estimated number of Latvian nationals residing in the United Kingdom was in 2017, when there were 117,000.

The Latvian diaspora provides around €500 million per year to the Latvian economy.

== Organisations ==
There are currently more than 100 Latvian schools across the world.

== Latvian artists in exile ==
Latvian art historian Jānis Siliņš, in 1990, described the movement to which Mark Rothko, Jānis Kalmīte, Lucia Peka, Mārtiņš Krūmiņš and other Latvian-Americans belong as "those artists who amidst the changing trends of contemporary art, after thirty years in exile and emigration, as still basically close to and developing the traditions of their homeland art - of the 'Latvian or Riga School'"

Artists of the Latvian diaspora include:

- Maurice Sterne (1878–1957) painter
- Hugo Kārlis Grotuss (1884–1951) painter
- Isac Friedlander (1890–1968) printmaker
- Jāzeps Grosvalds (1891–1920) painter
- Aleksandra Belcova (1892–1981) painter
- Mārtiņš Krūmiņš (1900 to 1992) painter
- Mark Rothko (1903–1970) Painter
- Philippe Halsman (1906–1979) photographer
- Jānis Kalmīte (1907–1996) painter
- Wally Brants (1909–1998) painter
- Lucia Peka (1912–1991) painter
- Vija Celmins (born 1939) painter

In 2004, in the state of Illinois, the Global Society for Latvian Art was created to track the Latvian Diaspora. It is a nonprofit 501(c)(3) corporation, whose stated mission is “to promote, preserve, and exhibit works of art created by artists who were exiled from Latvia as a result of the Second World War as well as other artists of Latvian descent; to promote and encourage global communication among persons interested in Latvian art and culture; to establish and operate a museum of Latvian diaspora art dedicated to collecting, studying, exhibiting and preserving such art; and to work with all existing Latvian-American organizations and other organizations in trust and harmony and to develop close ties between Latvian-Americans and others whose goals are to support and promote Latvian art and other Latvian cultural art forms.”

The World Latvian Art Center opened in 2014 in Cēsis. It was created with the aim of promoting the preservation of artistic values created by Latvian artists who went into exile due to World War II and the new generation living abroad. The center was established by the Global Society for Latvian Art.

== See also ==
- Latvian Diplomatic Service
- Latvian American
- Latvian Australian
- Latvian Canadian
- Latvians in the United Kingdom
- Latvian Finns
