= Lucia Peka =

Latvian painter (1912–1991)

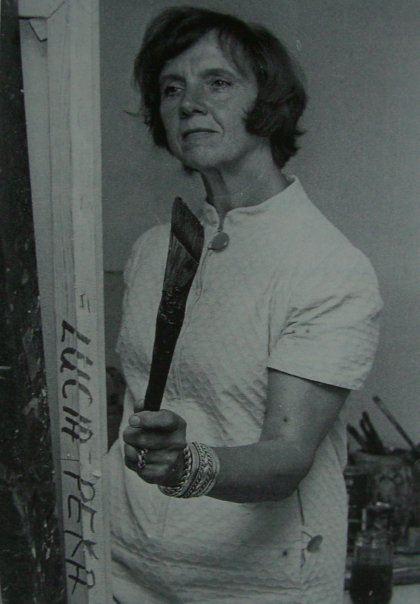
- Lucia Peka with brush in hand (1931)
- Born: Lūcija Rudzītis; March 30, 1912; Umurga Parish, Kreis Wolmar, Governorate of Livonia (now Limbaži Municipality, Latvia)
- Died: August 13, 1991 (aged 79); Pennsylvania, United States
- Education: McGill Conservatory (Montreal, Quebec); Carnegie Institute (Pittsburgh, Pennsylvania)
- Known for: Painting
- Movement: Expressionism

Lucia Peka (Latvian: Lūcija Peka, March 30, 1912 – August 13, 1991) was a Latvian-American artist. Born in the Governorate of Livonia of the Russian Empire, she became part of the diaspora of artists who fled Latvia during World War II, and eventually settled in the United States where she was a successful painter of landscapes, figures, and still life for almost 50 years. A touring gallery collection travelled within the US Midwest and Washington, D.C.(2010–2011) exhibiting a collection of Peka oil paintings along with other Latvian Displaced Persons of the mid 20th century.

== Life and work ==
Born Lūcija Rudzītis, in Latvia, Peka was educated and worked in Sweden, France, Germany, and Canada. She ultimately moved to the United States with husband and fellow Latvian Andrew Peka (Latvian: Andris Peka). They worked and resided in Pittsburgh, Pennsylvania until her death, in 1991. Interred with Latvian national recognition (Frontes teātra dalībniece) under her birth name Lūcija Rudzītis at the Latvian Cemetery in Elka Park, New York.

Lucia's father was a Roman Catholic priest in the St. James's Cathedral, Riga, Latvia until the family fled to Sweden during World War II.

After living and working for several years in Germany, France and Sweden, Peka moved to Canada where she continued her art studies at the McGill Conservatory in Montreal, and the Carnegie Institute in Pittsburgh where her art was exhibited at the Carnegie Museum of Art, along with several other prestigious galleries.

Beginning July 24, 2010, four of Lucia Peka's oil paintings were included in a United States tour, a Latvian Diaspora exhibition entitled, "The Artist in Exile – Latvian Refugee Art, 1944–1950." In collaboration with the Klinklava Gallery of the Latvian Center Garezers, The Global Society for Latvian Art featured the work of 24 Latvian Diaspora artists of the 20th Century. The tour included stops across the United States Midwest with a final stop in the Lithuanian World Center in Lemont, IL.

"The Artist in Exile" is the second traveling exhibition organized by the Global Society, and made its first stop in Three Rivers, Michigan. The exhibit featured work by 24 artists created when these artists were living as displaced persons during the years 1944–1950. After the opening reception on July 24, the exhibit travelled to centers of Latvian diaspora culture throughout the United States.

== Latvian diaspora ==
Peka is part of the Latvian Diaspora – Latvian nationals who produced art outside of Latvia during the Soviet occupation. As more than 200,000 Latvian citizens died during World War II and the Nazi occupation, thousands of Latvians fled the country to become the Diaspora. When these Latvian "Displaced Persons" came to the United States and other western countries, they saw in the subsequent Soviet occupation of their homeland, an effort to eradicate Latvian culture. But resources are now available, in Latvia and abroad, to provide a substantial overview of art from this Latvian Diaspora period. In Latvia the three main institutions responsible for maintaining such information on artists of the Diaspora are the Latvian National Museum of Art, the Latvian Center for Contemporary Art, the Latvian Artist's Union and, especially the World Center for Latvian Art in Cesis. Together, they have begun to complete the history of European art.

Latvian art historian Janis Siliņš described the movement to which Lucia Peka, Mārtiņš Krūmiņš and other Latvian-Americans belong as "those artists who amidst the changing trends of contemporary art, after thirty years in exile and emigration, are developing the traditions of their homeland art – of the Latvian or Riga School."

== Awards and criticism ==
R. Stevens of La Revue Moderne, commenting on a December 1968 installation of her work at the Galerie Roccia in Montreal, wrote, "Lucia's paintings are powerful and heavily textured. She suggests whole worlds, working with simple but ample strokes of brush and palette knife. Her painting, 'The Well' stands out against the light of a tormented sky, suggesting a feeling of pathetic solitude. Her choice of colors is strong yet harmonious. Her compositions seem almost musical. She may be one of the last great colorists."

Lucia Peka won the "Purchase Prize" at the Ford City, Pennsylvania Art Collection. She won the Lila Shelby Award at the National Academy Museum in New York. Owners of her work include the Latvian National Museum of Art, the Permanent Collection in the Alfred Khouri Memorial Wing of the Chrysler Museum of Art in Norfolk, Virginia, the Huntington Library and Art Collections in San Marino, California, actor George Clooney, and former New York Governor Mario Cuomo. Many of her paintings have been donated to charitable endeavors, such as the Women's Hospital in Cleveland, PBS Channel 13 (New York) and the American Cancer Society. After a June 1969 showing of Peka's work at the Chrysler Museum, Cornelia Justice of the Norfolk Ledger-Star commented, "I recall with pleasure the Lucia Peka oil so innocuously labeled 'Flowers'. With a technique so bold and a color sense so far above average, this should have been given a more flamboyant title."

== Associations and influences ==
Vilhelms Purvītis pioneered the Latvian landscape painting tradition. which Peka followed. His favored themes included spring floodwaters, melting snow, ice, sludge, reflections of trees. Whereas in his younger days his work indicated a worldview grounded in realism, his turn-of-the-century paintings display typical impressionist brushwork.

By the 1920s, modernism in Latvian art was in decline as artists turned to Neorealism. Similar to the concurrent New Objectivity movement in German painting, which typically employed an aloof, if perfectly detailed, depiction of objects in nature, Neorealists of the Rīga Art Group (including Aleksandra Belcova and Uga Skulme) were pressing forward with their experimentation. Peka did not follow in this direction.

Instead, during the 1930s, Peka and her contemporaries turned to tonal painting, and richly textured, almost scarified surfaces. Here an influence could be noted from the works of Belgian and French artists, especially Maurice de Vlaminck and Isidore Opsomer. These were the textural and stylistic influences which shaped Lucia Peka. Influenced by Leonardo da Vinci and Rembrandt, these artists paid particular attention to issues of light, coloring and texture. With naïve expression, painters preserved their closeness to nature, accenting mythological, historical, and traditional Latvian ethnic motifs and folk art.

After Kārlis Ulmanis' coup in 1934, a new official Latvian government policy encouraged traditional realism. Artists were required to have a moral stance and nationalistic content in art works, monumentality and positivism, and to turn away from the influence of European art. Two effects of this policy were to discourage artistic freedom and encourage artists such as Peka to leave Latvia.

Once she had relocated to the US, Peka was an active member of several Latvian diaspora art associations and regional artist groups, including: Copley Society of Art (Copley, Mass.), Fairfax Virginia Art League, the American Latvian Artists Association, Artist's League of Central New Jersey, the National Association of Women Artists in New York, and the American Latvian Association of Rockville, Maryland.

Along with Mārtiņš Krūmiņš (1900–1992), Jānis Kalmīte (1907–1996), Aleksandra Belcova (1892–1981) and Vija Celmins (born 1938), Lucia Peka began to be seen as an expressionist painter well-known in the World War II Latvian diaspora community. Throughout their 50 years of exile from Latvia, these painters kept alive the folk themes of Latvian ethnic culture in the face of invasion and occupation by foreign powers. Peka and the others attempted to develop an expatriate Latvian national art, following in the footsteps of artists such as Ādams Alksnis, Teodors Ūders, and Vilhelms Purvītis.

== Gallery ==
Interest in Peka's lifetime of work is steadily increasing as more becomes known about the extent of the Latvian Diaspora, and the artists who comprise it. Since the reestablishment of an independent Latvia in 1991, Latvian nationals have begun to catalogue and exhibit art from this period, which has become more valuable as Latvians attempt to reclaim missing parts of their culture.

In a 1972 interview, Lucia Peka explained that her "outlook on life has always been bright, hopeful and positive with a relentless energy and movement." When asked about her preference for working with oils and the pallet knife, the artist compared her painting to "cooking with butter, both having a similar texture."

According to Dr. Ansis Karps of the Latvian National Museum of Art, Peka was, "always surrounded by music, and had a wonderfully sensitive and absorbing life as she sought to express feelings, desires and dreams through oil painting."

== Notes ==
- "Ziedi" is both a City in Latvia (Alūksnes Rajons) and a formal usage Latvian word meaning "Flowers."
- "Puķes" is an informal Latvian word for "Blossoms."
- "Dom" is the commonly used name for the Protestant Riga Cathedral (Rīgas Doms) in Riga, Latvia.
