= Nils Veinbergs =

Latvian footballer (born 2007)

Personal information
- Full name: Nils Henrijs Veinbergs
- Date of birth: 20 July 2007 (age 19)
- Place of birth: Riga, Latvia
- Height: 1.93 m (6 ft 4 in)
- Position: Centre forward

Team information
- Current team: TPS (on loan from Ilves)
- Number: 44

Youth career
- –2024: RoPS

Senior career*
Years	Team	Apps	(Gls)
2024	RoPS II	6	(16)
2025–	Ilves	0	(0)
2025–	Ilves II	24	(7)
2026	→ Ekenäs IF (loan)	12	(5)
2026–	→ TPS (loan)	12	(2)

International career^{‡}
2024	Latvia U18	2	(0)
2025–	Latvia U19	13	(4)
- * Club domestic league appearances and goals as of 13 November 2026 ‡ National team caps and goals as of 15 August 2026

Nils Henrijs Veinbergs (born 20 July 2007) is a Latvian professional football player who plays as a forward for Veikkausliiga side Turun Palloseura, on loan from Ilves.

== Early life ==
Veinbergs was born in Riga, Latvia, but was raised in Rovaniemi, Finland. His father Normunds Veinbergs is a Latvian-Finnish former professional volley ball player, who played 16 seasons in Finland, and holds a legendary status in Finnish volleyball.

== Club career ==
Veinbergs played in the youth sector of Rovaniemen Palloseura. For the 2025 season, he signed a professional three-year deal with Veikkausliiga club Ilves. He played mostly with the club's reserve team, but made two appearances and scored two goals for the first team in 2025 Finnish League Cup.

In January 2026, he was loaned out to Ekenäs IF in Finnish second-tier Ykkösliiga. In July 2026, he signed a loan deal with Veikkausliiga club Turun Palloseura. On 9 August, he scored his first league goal against Kuopion Palloseura, an equalizer on extra-time in 1–1 away draw.

== International career ==
Veinbergs has played for Latvia at under-18 and under-19 youth international levels.

== Personal life ==
He holds a dual Finnish-Latvian citizenship.
