= Finland–Latvia relations =

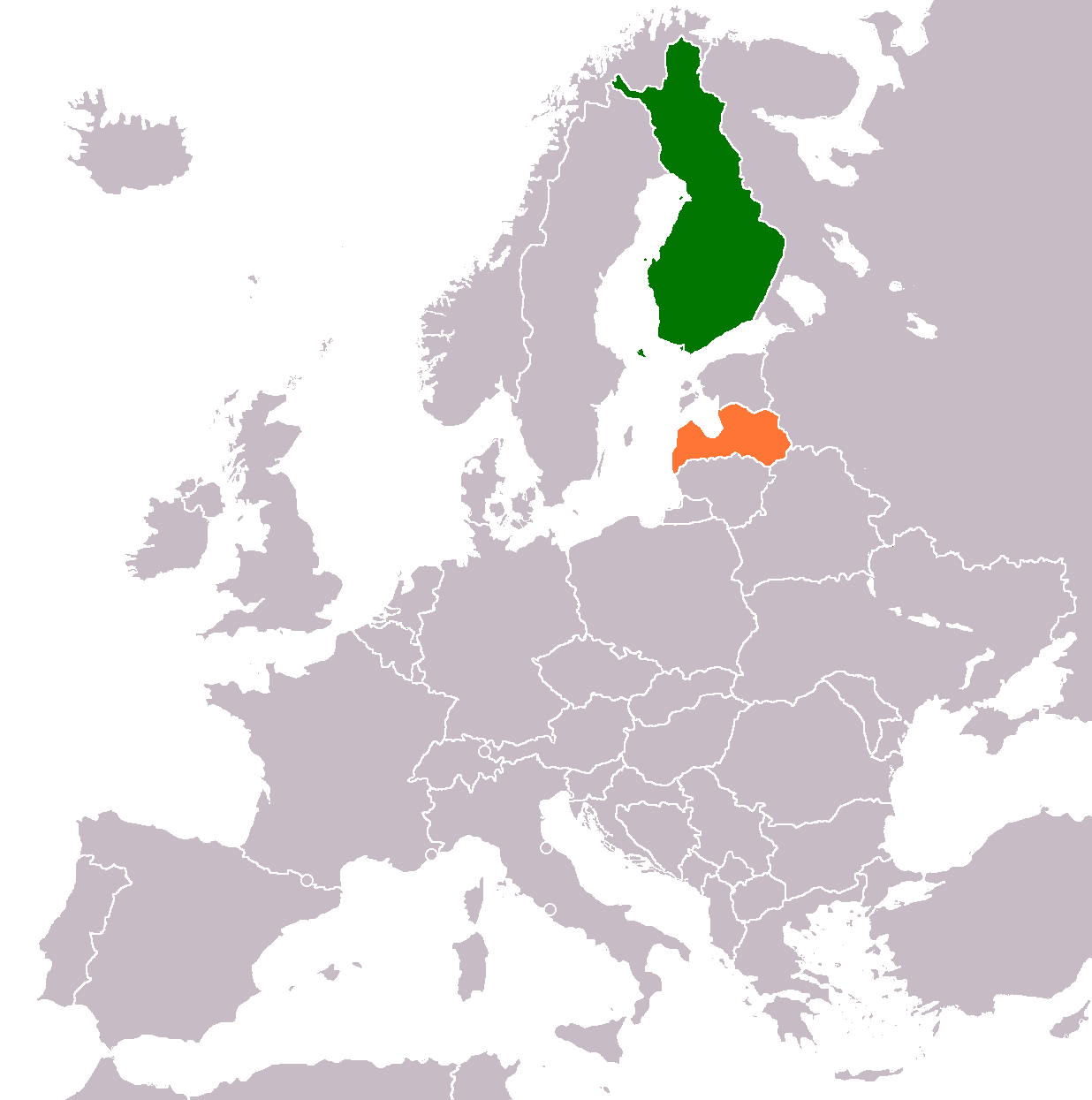

- Finland: Latvia

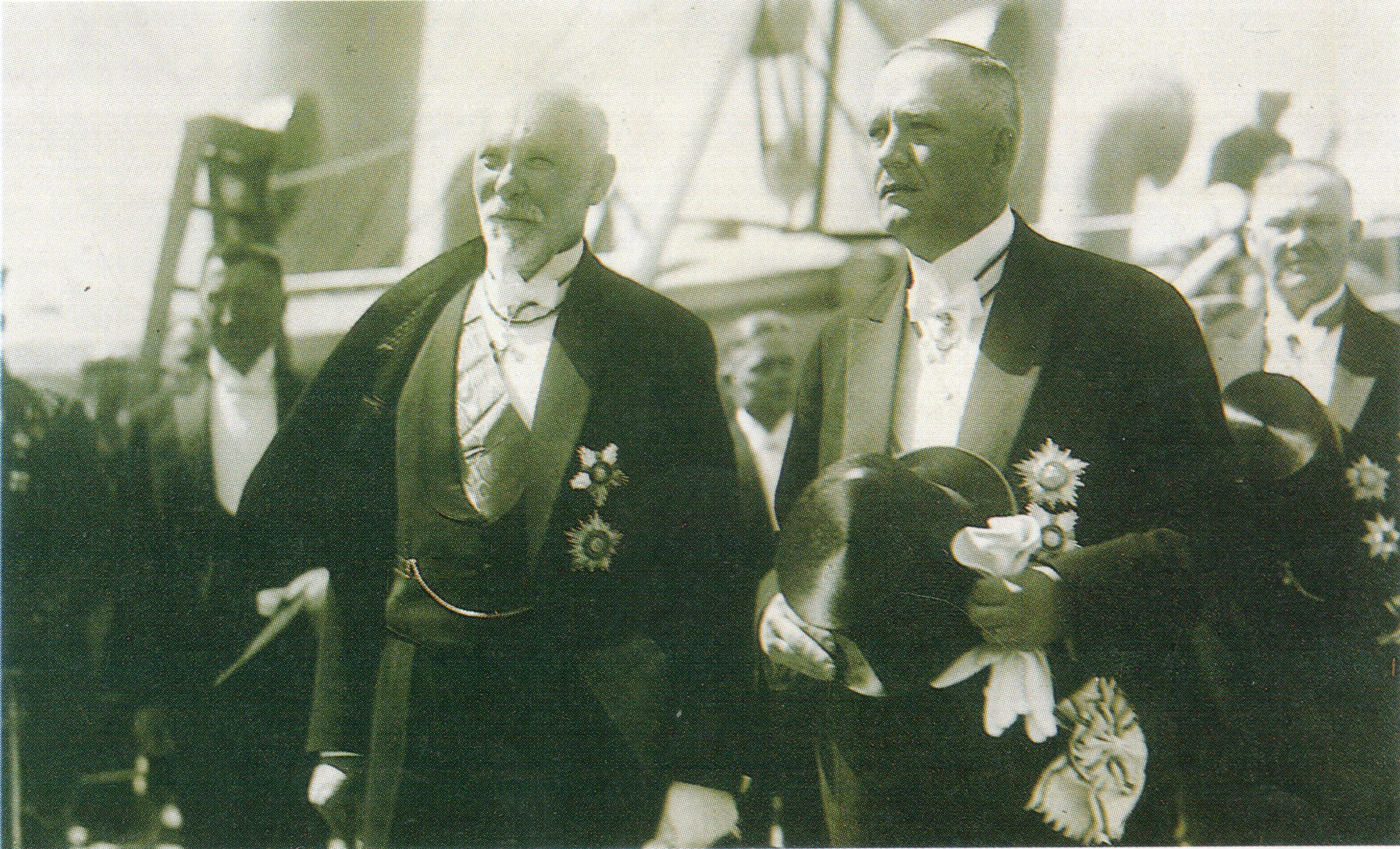
President of Finland Lauri Kristian Relander and President of Latvia Jānis Čakste during Relander's 1926 official visit to Latvia. In the background, the Foreign Minister of Finland Eemil Nestor Setälä to the right.

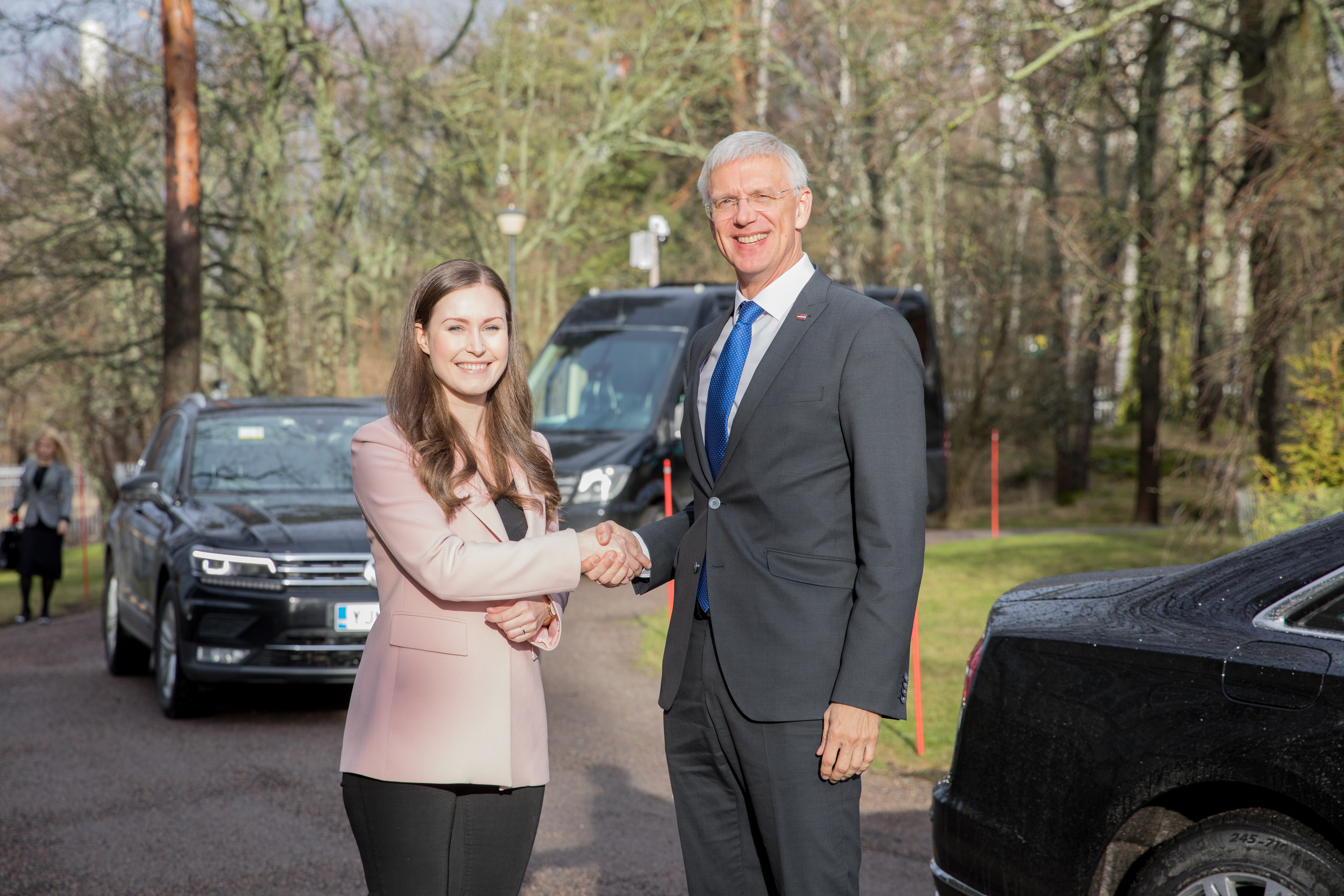
Finnish Prime Minister Sanna Marin with Latvian Prime Minister Krišjānis Kariņš meet in Helsinki, 12 February 2020

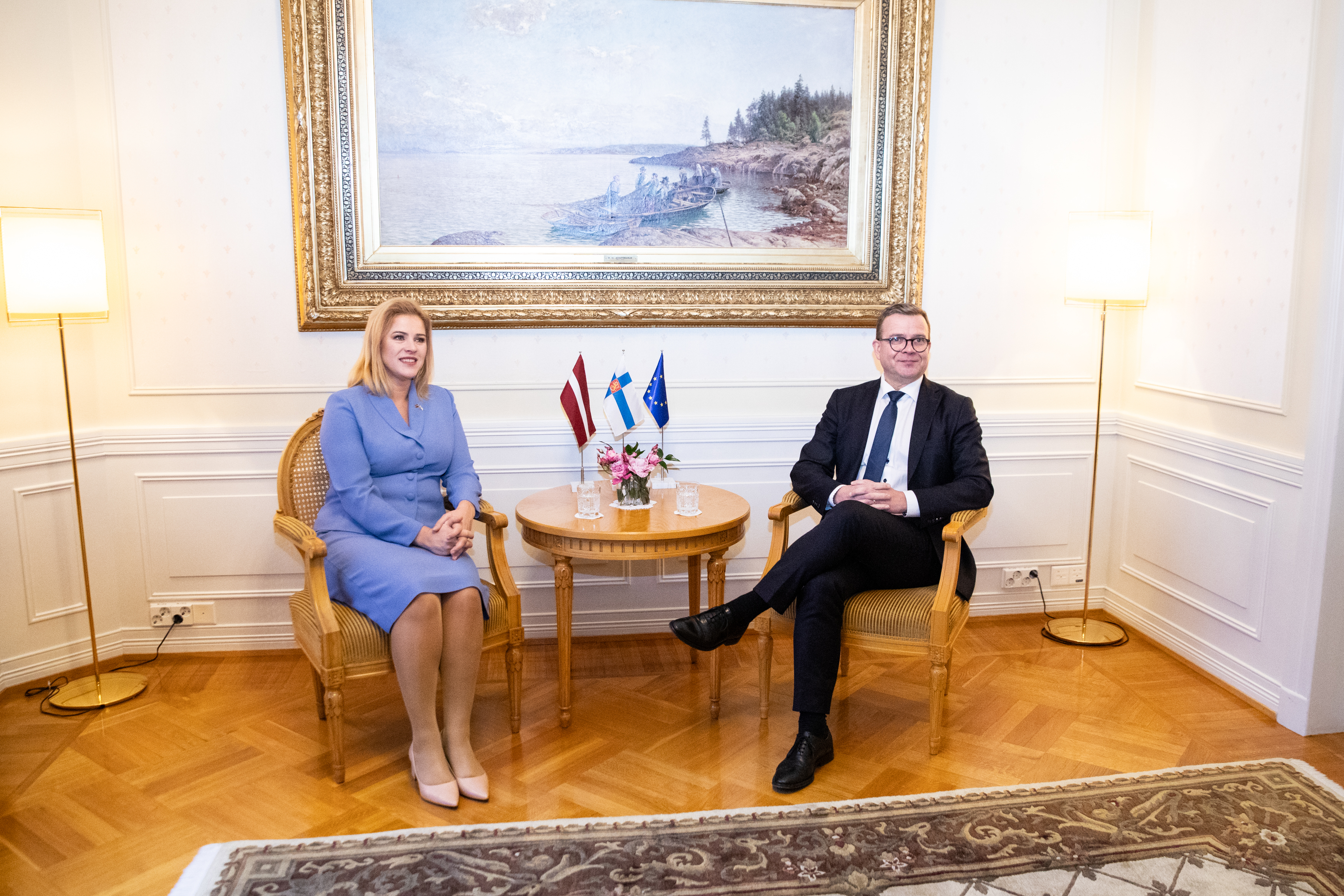
Finnish Prime Minister Petteri Orpo and Latvian Prime Minister Evika Siliņa in Helsinki, 24 November 2023

Finland–Latvia relations are the bilateral relations between Finland and Latvia. Finland has an embassy in Riga. Latvia has an embassy in Helsinki. Both countries are full members of the Council of Europe, Council of the Baltic Sea States, Nordic-Baltic Eight, Joint Expeditionary Force, European Union, NATO and Eurozone.

== State visits ==
In 1999, the President of Latvia visited Finland. Finland pledged its support for Latvia to join the European Union.

In June 1999, Latvian Prime Minister Vilis Kristopans met Finnish Minister for European Affairs and Foreign Trade Kimmo Sasi.

== Transport ==
Finnair and airBaltic operate services between Riga and Helsinki.

== Resident diplomatic missions ==
- Finland has an embassy in Riga.
- Latvia has an embassy in Helsinki.
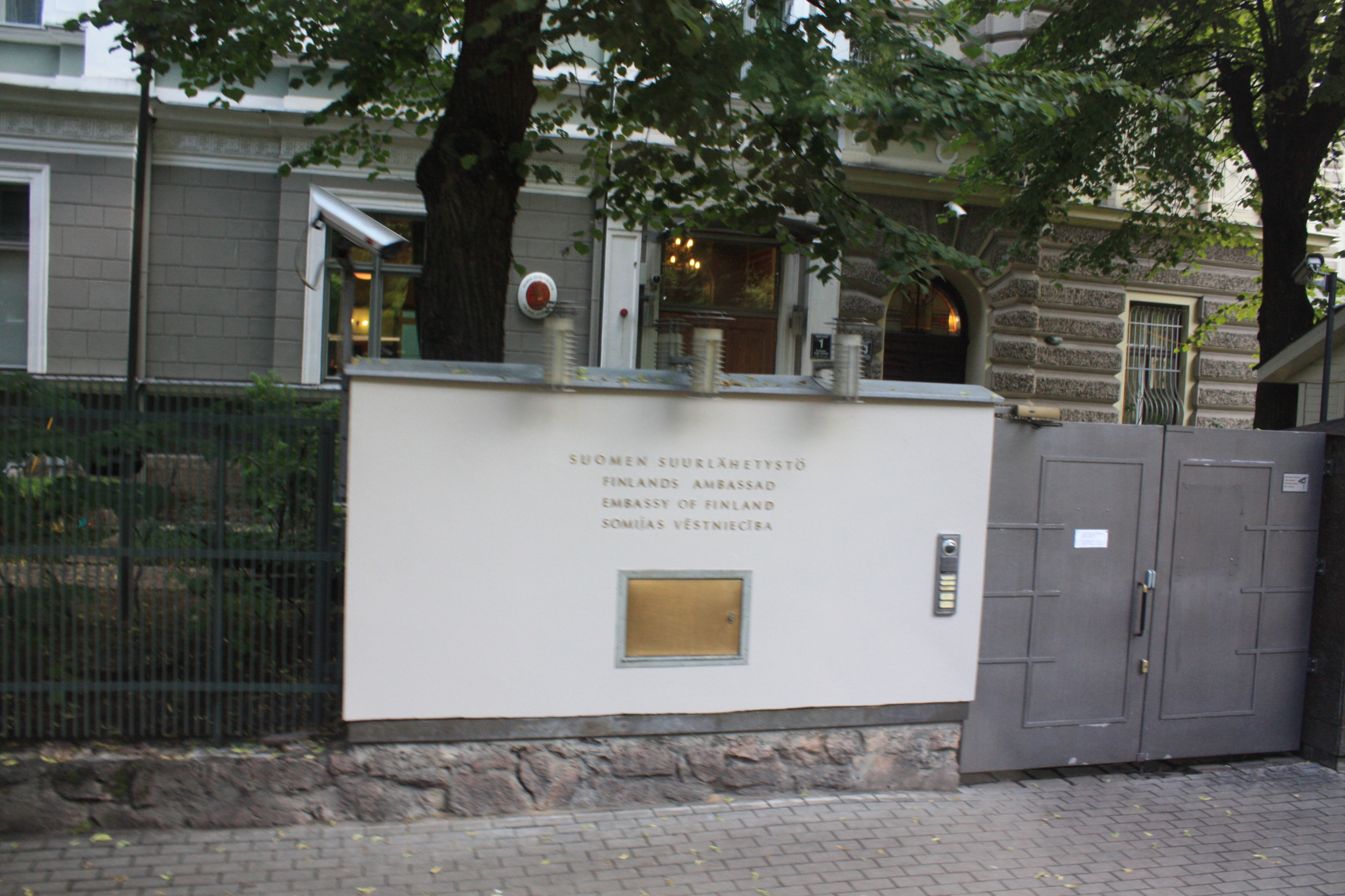
Embassy of Finland in Riga

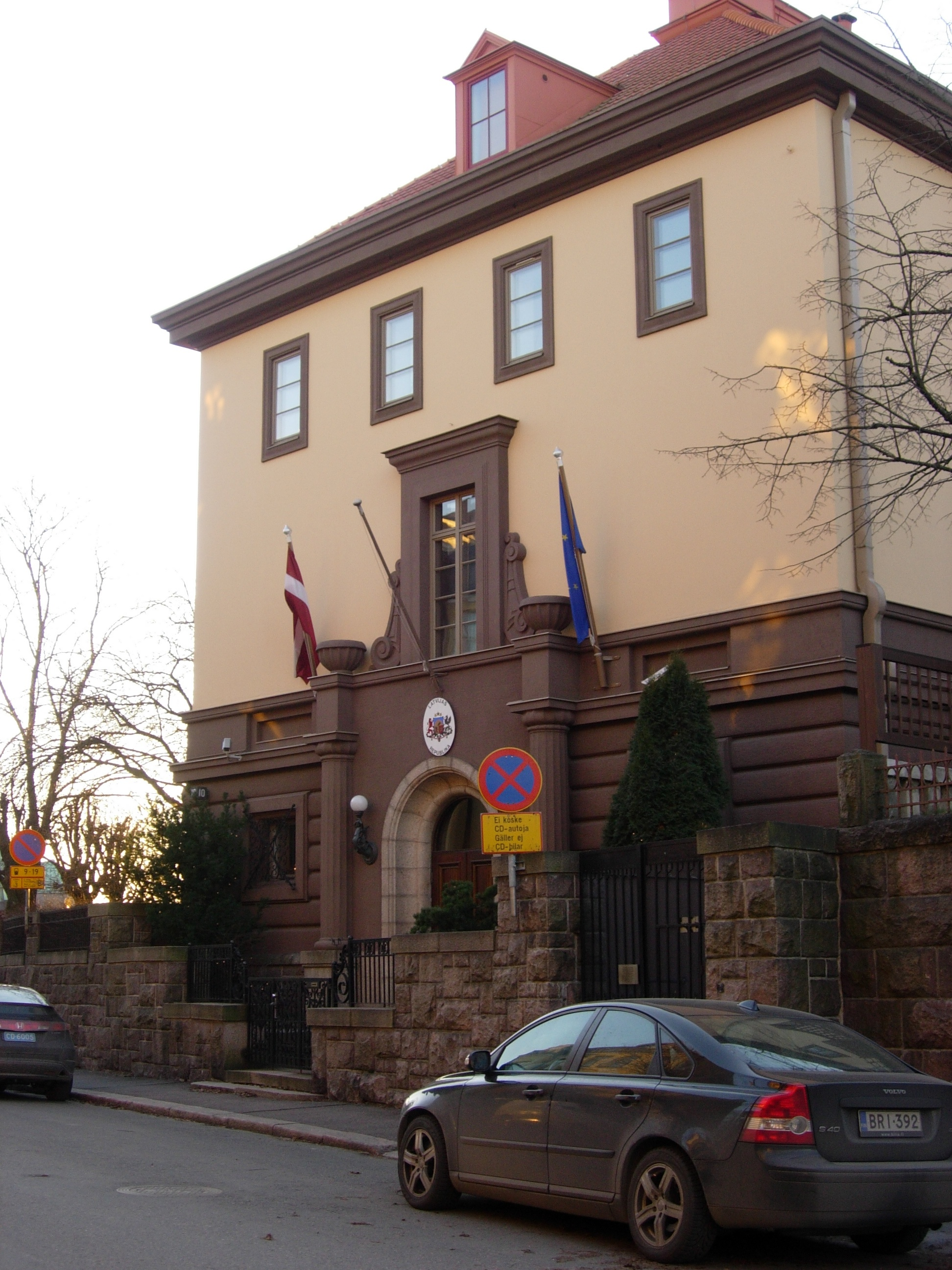
Embassy of Latvia in Helsinki

== See also ==
- Foreign relations of Finland
- Foreign relations of Latvia
- Latvians in Finland
