= Jānis Kalmīte =

Latvian expressionist painter

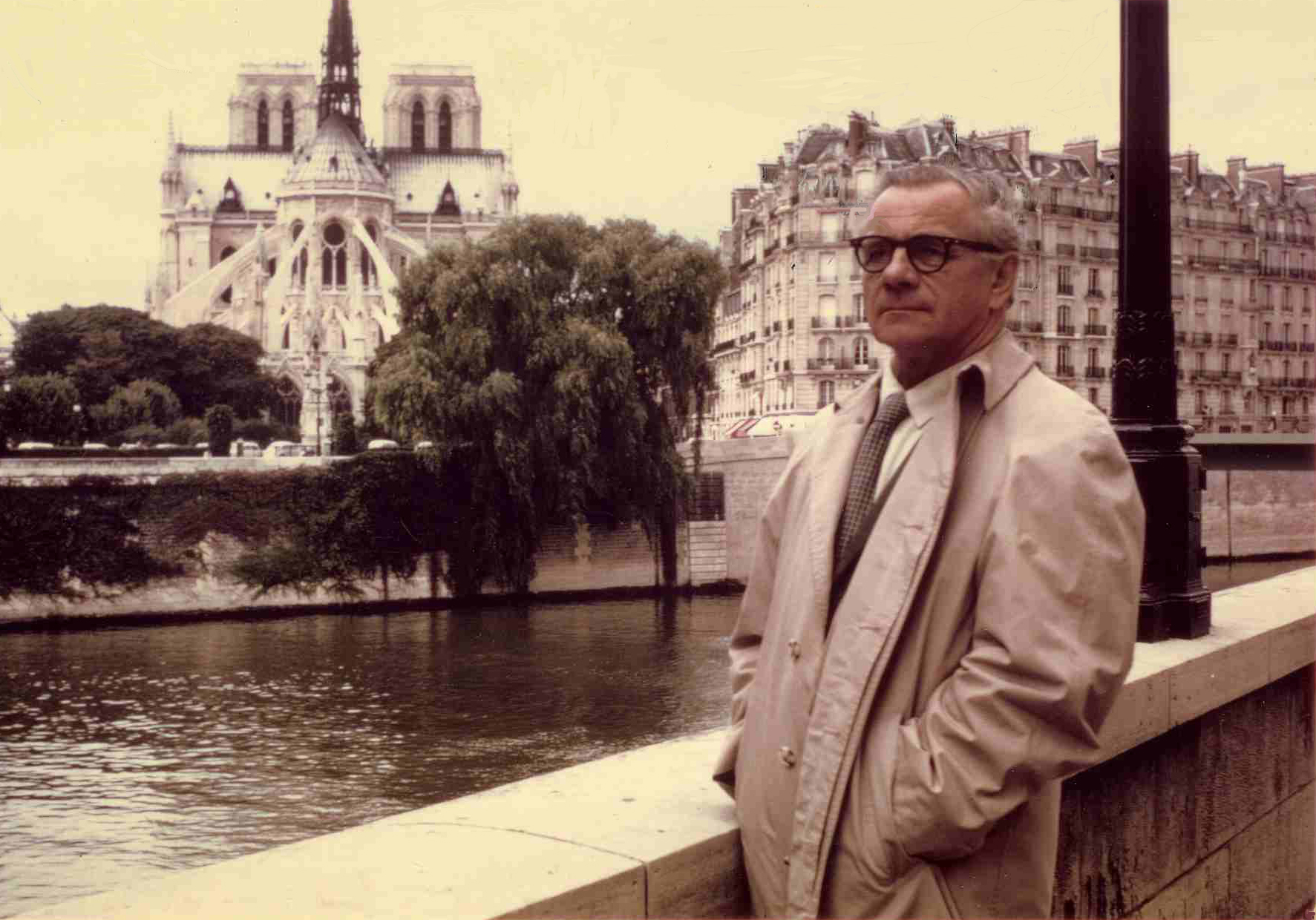
- Jānis Kalmīte in Paris, 1968.
- Born: 2 March 1907; Kauguri parish, Kreis Wolmar, Governorate of Livonia, Russian Empire (now Valmiera Municipality, Latvia)
- Died: 3 July 1996 (aged 89); Minnesota, United States
- Known for: Painting
- Movement: Modernism

Jānis Kalmīte (2 March 1907, Kauguri parish (now Valmiera Municipality) - 3 July 1996, USA) was a Latvian expressionist painter and among the best-known artists in the Latvian post-World War II diaspora community. His name is associated with the development of a singular theme – the rija or threshing barn. Rijas, were historically among the oldest structures on the traditional Latvian homestead. Throughout his half-century of exile from Latvia, Kalmīte transformed the rija into an artistic symbol for the persistence of Latvian ethnic culture in the face of invasion and occupation by foreign powers.

Coming of age during the first period of Latvia’s independence between the two World Wars, Kalmīte studied in the figural master studio of Ģederts Eliass at the Latvian Academy of Art, from which he graduated in 1935. He joined the artists’ society Mūksalieši, whose stated mission was to develop a Latvian national art, following in the footsteps of artists such as Ādams Alksnis and Teodors Ūders. Kalmīte left Latvia with his wife Alīda (born Zīverts) and infant daughter Guna, as political refugees in 1944, when Latvia was again occupied by the Soviet Union. He spent six years as a displaced person in Germany (where a second daughter, Lelde, was born) and then immigrated to America at age forty-three. While he lived to witness the re-establishment of Latvian independence in 1991, he never returned to his homeland. He died at age 89 and his remains were later taken to his hometown of Valmiera, Latvia for interment in the Kalmīte family plot.

During the course of his career, Kalmīte participated in over 100 exhibitions in the United States, Canada, Latvia, Germany, Sweden and other European countries. The 100th anniversary of his birth was commemorated in 2007 with a solo exhibition at the Latvian National Museum of Art in Rīga, and in a dual exhibition with the work of his artist daughter, Lelde Alīda Kalmīte, at the Valmiera Museum (Valmieras novadpētniecibas muzejs). The Salvatorkolleg in Bad Wurzach, Germany, where Kalmīte and his family lived before immigrating to the United States in 1950, also presented an exhibition of work the artist produced during his years in Germany.

Kalmīte spent the last 46 years of his life in Minnesota, but was never fully integrated either artistically or socially into American society. His name is virtually unknown in American artistic circles, but within the Latvian diaspora his fame grew during his lifetime. After his death a substantial collection of his work was bequeathed to the Valmiera Museum, and the Latvian National Museum of Art also possesses a collection of his paintings, including several early pre-war works. His paintings may be found in hundreds of private collections throughout the world, and Gallery Antonija in Rīga represents his work today.

Although his work is strongly nationalistic, Kalmīte was intensely interested in the development of Modernism and he described himself as an expressionist. The work of Vincent van Gogh was a major early influence, and he greatly admired many European modernist artists, such as Rouault, Vlaminck and, in particular, Braque. After immigrating to the United States, he was also influenced by American abstract expressionism, and stylistically his late works grew increasingly abstract. Today his work is becoming better known in his homeland, as the history of Latvian diaspora art begins to be absorbed into the overall history of Latvian 20th-century art.
