= Tatjana Suta =

- Born: 28 March 1923; Paris, France
- Died: 10 June 2004 (aged 81); Riga, Latvia

Tatjana Suta (1923 – 2004) was a Latvian ballet dancer and museum founder.

Suta was born in Paris as the daughter of the potter-painter Romans Suta and the painter Aleksandra Beļcova. She pursued a ballet career while her parents were important figures in the art scene of Riga.

In 1941, with his staff of the studio her father was deported to Moscow, then to Almaty, and finally in Tbilisi where after a show trial he was executed on 14 July 1944. Suta Sr. was posthumously rehabilitated in 1959. She turned the former flat of her parents on Elizabetes street 57A-26 in Riga into the memorial museum and art gallery Sutas un Beļcovas muzejs with over 4,000 works of art by the couple.

Suta died in Riga.
