= Edgars Vinters =

Latvian painter

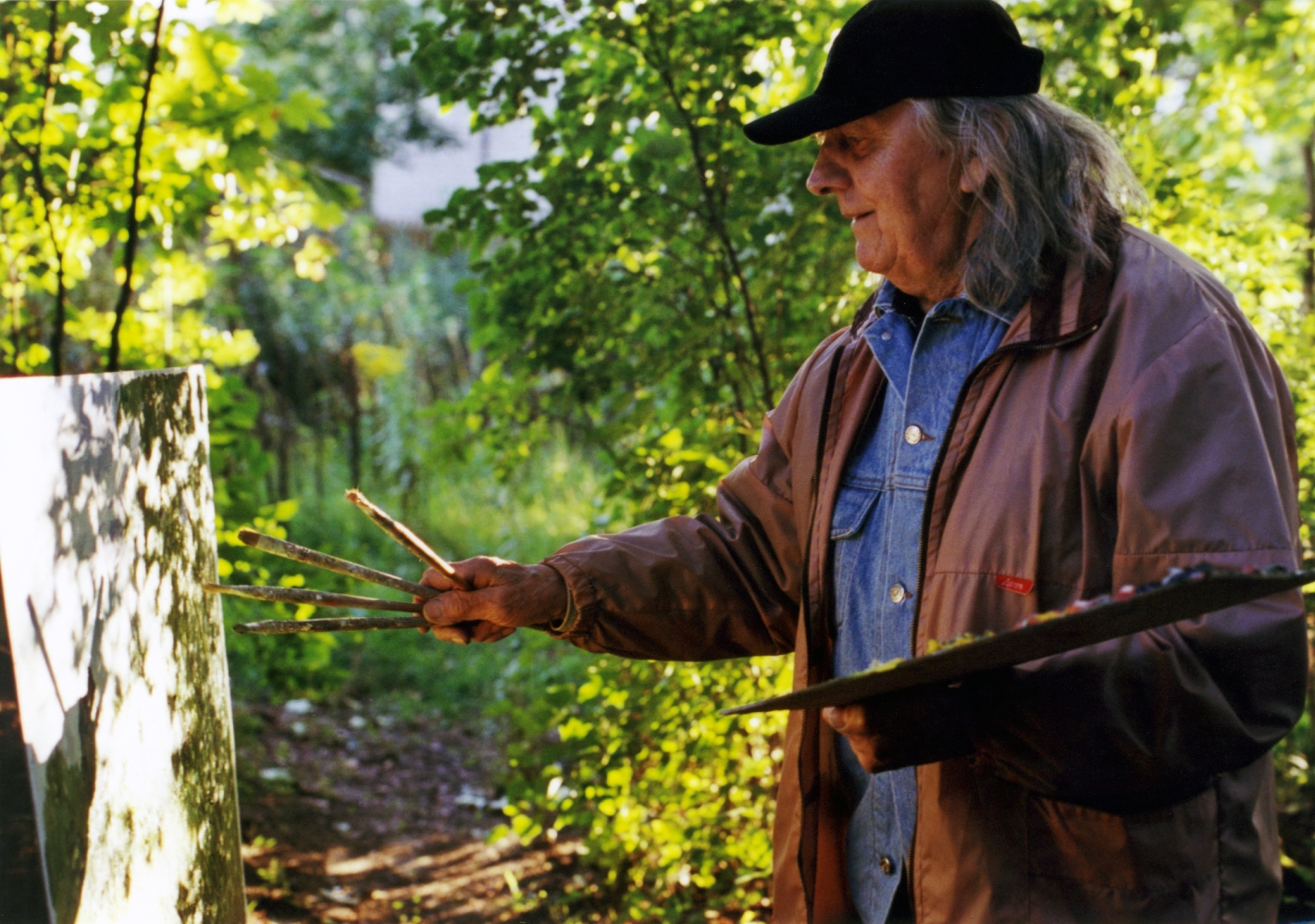
- Vinters at work, 2006
- Born: 22 September 1919; Riga, Latvia
- Died: 29 April 2014 (aged 94)
- Resting place: Forest Cemetery, Riga
- Education: Art Academy of Latvia
- Known for: Landscape and still life painting
- Spouse: Helma Krause
- Children: Ilmārs
- Awards: Order of the Three Stars

Edgars Vinters (22 September 1919 – 29 April 2014) was a Latvian painter, specializing in landscapes and still life. His paintings, known for their rich and diverse use of color, have been described as "a source of inspiration for at least one generation" of Latvian artists.

== Life ==
Born in Riga, Edgars Vinters was the only child of the facade and decoration painter Hermanis Vinters (1874–1939) and his wife Anna, née Kalniņa, (1879–1953). As a ten-year-old boy he met with the pastelist Voldemārs Irbe, who instructed Vinters in pastel painting and helped to foster his appreciation for nature. From 1935 on, he wrote small articles for children's and youth magazines, which he illustrated with pen and ink drawings and linocuts. With the money he made from these pieces, he contributed to the school fee for the commercial college he attended until 1940, after a change of school. Resulting from contact he made with the painter Hugo Kārlis Grotuss, from 1937 Vinters changed his painting style. Grotuss encouraged him to give up 'the dark phase' he had developed through Irbe, to use brighter primers and to show more briskness and color in his paintings. During this time, he was also called upon to paint a series of porcelain plates for president Kārlis Ulmanis.

After receiving his high school diploma, Vinters joined the Art Academy of Latvia and until 1944 studied under the professors Jānis Kuga, Leo Svemps, Jānis Cielavs, Valdemārs Tone, Jānis Annuss, Kārlis Miesnieks and Vilhelms Purvītis. In 1944, Vinters had to drop out of his studies; he was drafted for the service in the Latvian Legion and deployed near Toruń on the Vistula River. In 1945 he was taken prisoner of war by the Soviet Army and deported to a POW camp near Moscow. There, Russian officers made out his artistic abilities and facilitated the establishment of an atelier. After returning to Riga in 1947, he began to teach art and drafting at a secondary school; at the same time, he attended Janis Rozentāls Art Highschool and got his qualifications in teaching in 1949.

Throughout the Soviet period, Vinters' work was displayed primarily within Latvia; however, after Latvia became independent in 1991, he began to receive attention from a wider audience. Vinters was given a solo exhibition in England in 1992, the first of many in that country; he also began to show his paintings in the United States and Germany during the 1990s and 2000s. Vinters continued to exhibit his paintings until his death in 2014.

== Style ==
Vinters was a realist painter who also took inspiration from the impressionist movement. The majority of his works were landscape and still-life paintings, emphasizing natural landscapes and flowers; however, he did also paint some urban scenes. Early works from his childhood and youth were made with pencil and ink pen; later, he made linocuts and pastel works for a short time, before starting his predominant medium of oil painting. Frequently in his craft he made aquarelles and, as a specialty during the 1970s, monotypes. However, oil painting remained his primary medium throughout his career. Vinters painted many of his works en plein air.

Vinters' work was acclaimed for its usage of light and color; through his usage of layering and blurs, he achieved a wide range of lighting and color levels even within individual pieces. He has described his primary goal in painting as "to strive for the light".

== Private life ==
In 1951 Vinters married Helma Krause, a teacher and colleague. They had one child, a son named Ilmārs, who was born in 1958. Vinters was buried on 2 May 2014 at the 1st Riga Forest Cemetery in the northeastern part of Riga at the side of his mother.

== Awards and honors ==
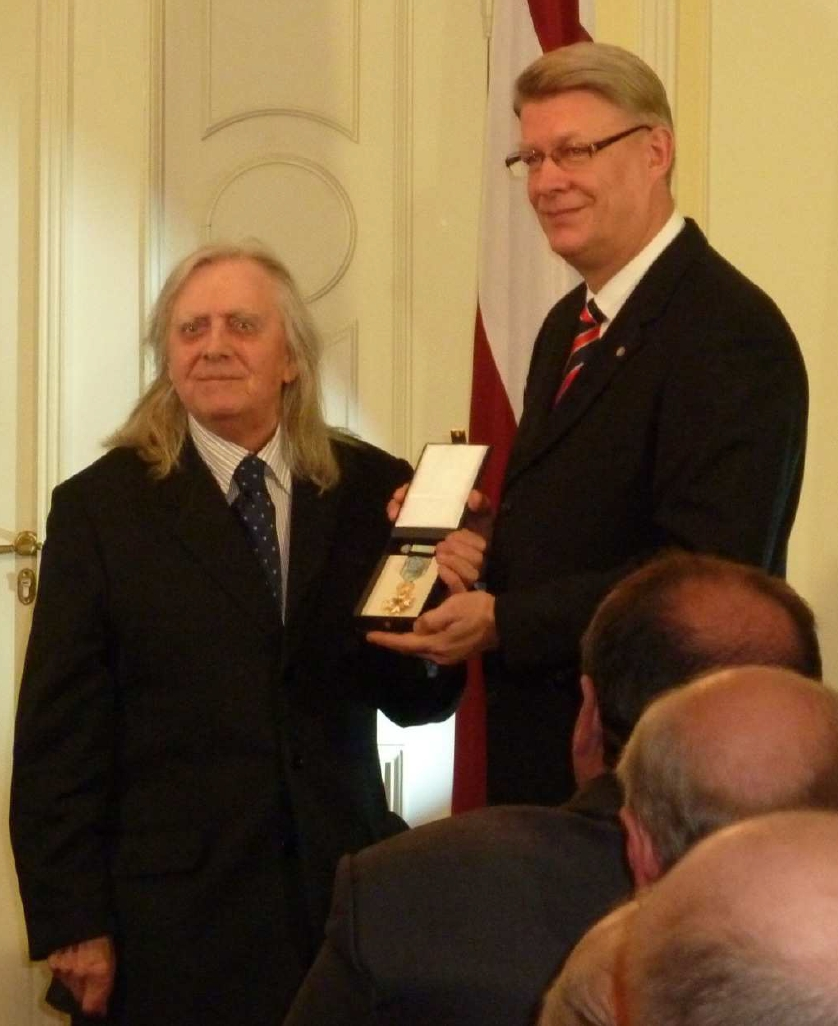
Edgars Vinters and president Valdis Zatlers, 2009

On 16 November 2009 Edgars Vinters was awarded the Order of the Three Stars by President Valdis Zatlers in recognition of his lifetime achievement.

During a state visit by Turkish President Abdullah Gül on 21 April 2013 in Latvia, the Latvian President Andris Bērziņš presented to the Turkish presidential couple as a gift a painting of Edgars Vinters. Some of Vinters' paintings were also included in the personal collection of Princess Diana.

== Gallery ==
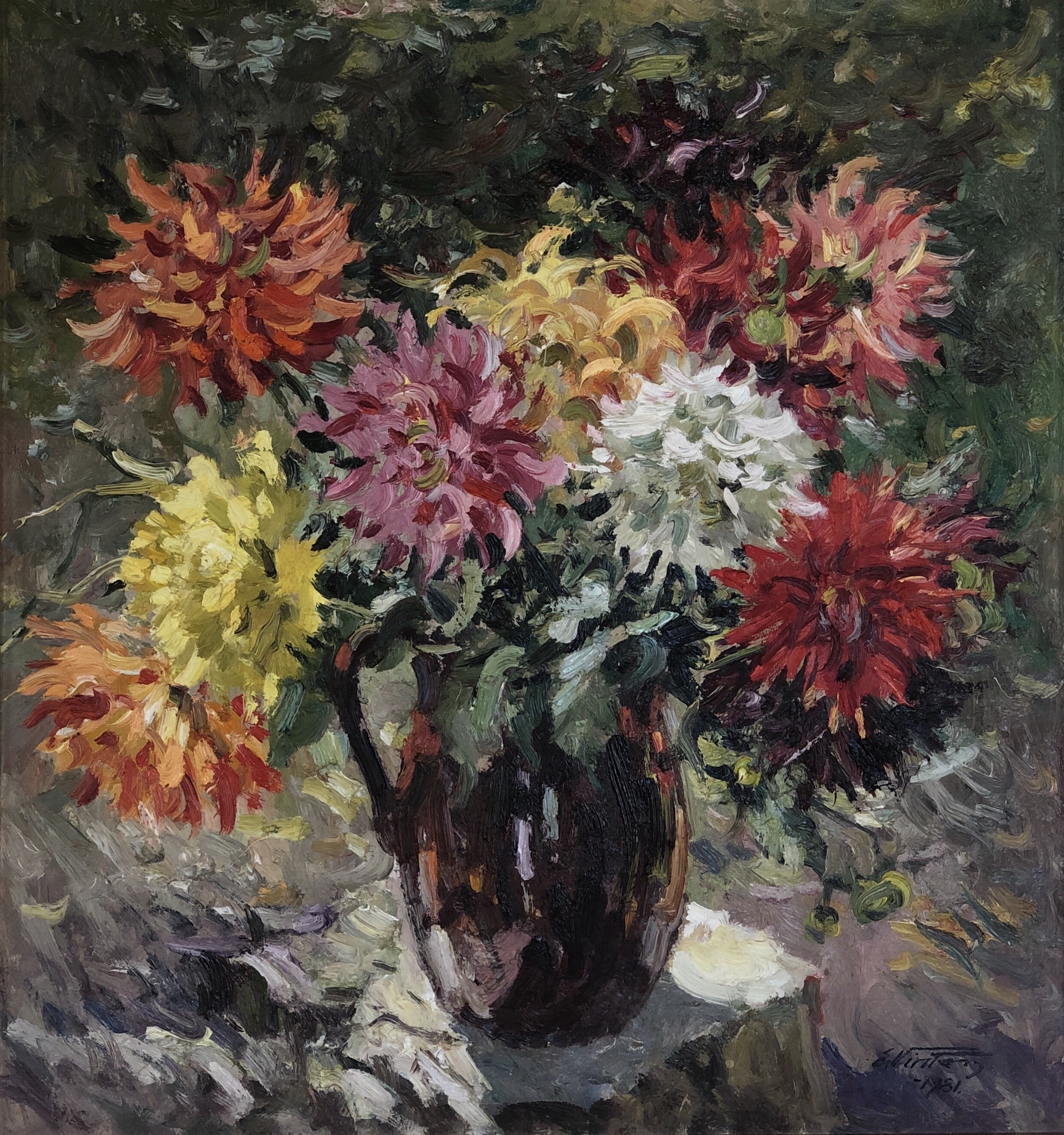
Edgars Vinters, Dhalies, Oil on cardboard; 73 x 68 cm, 1981 (Private collection)

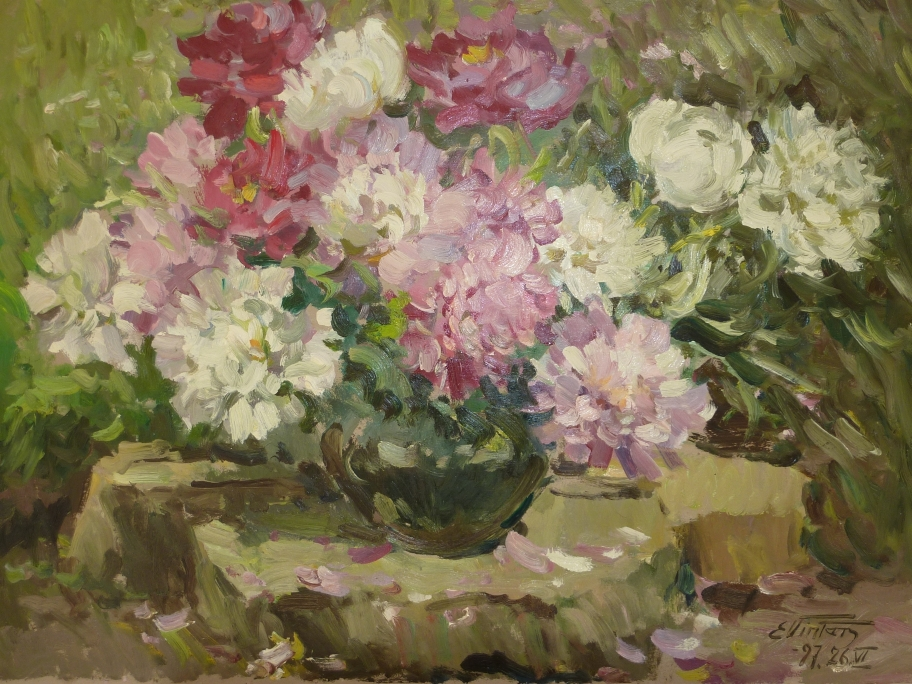
Edgars Vinters, Peonies, Oil on cardboard; 70 x 90 cm, 1997 (Hans Joachim Gerber collection)

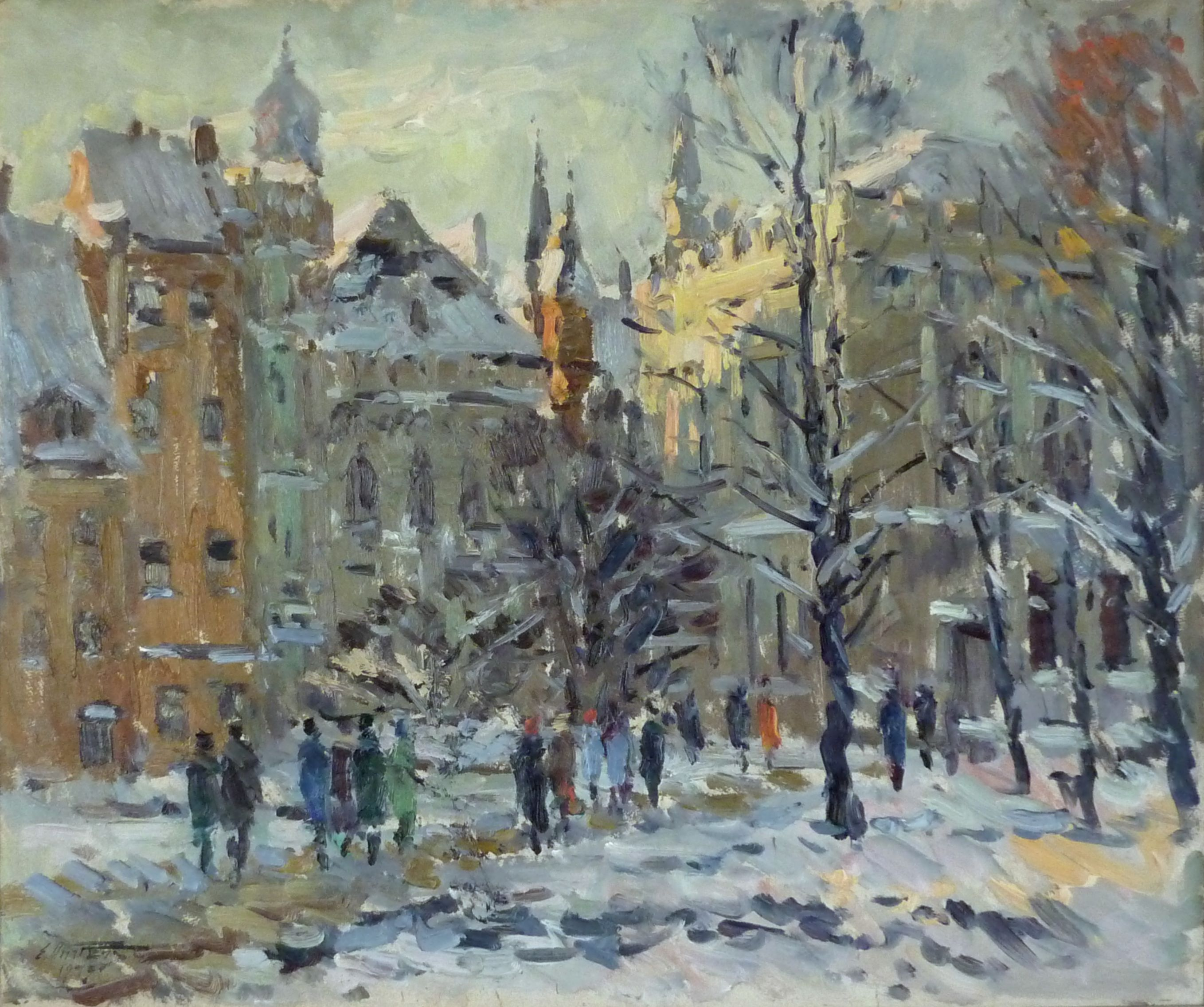
Edgars Vinters, An afternoon at the lower and upper guild, Riga, Oil on cardboard; 80 x 95 cm, 1975(Hans Joachim Gerber collection)

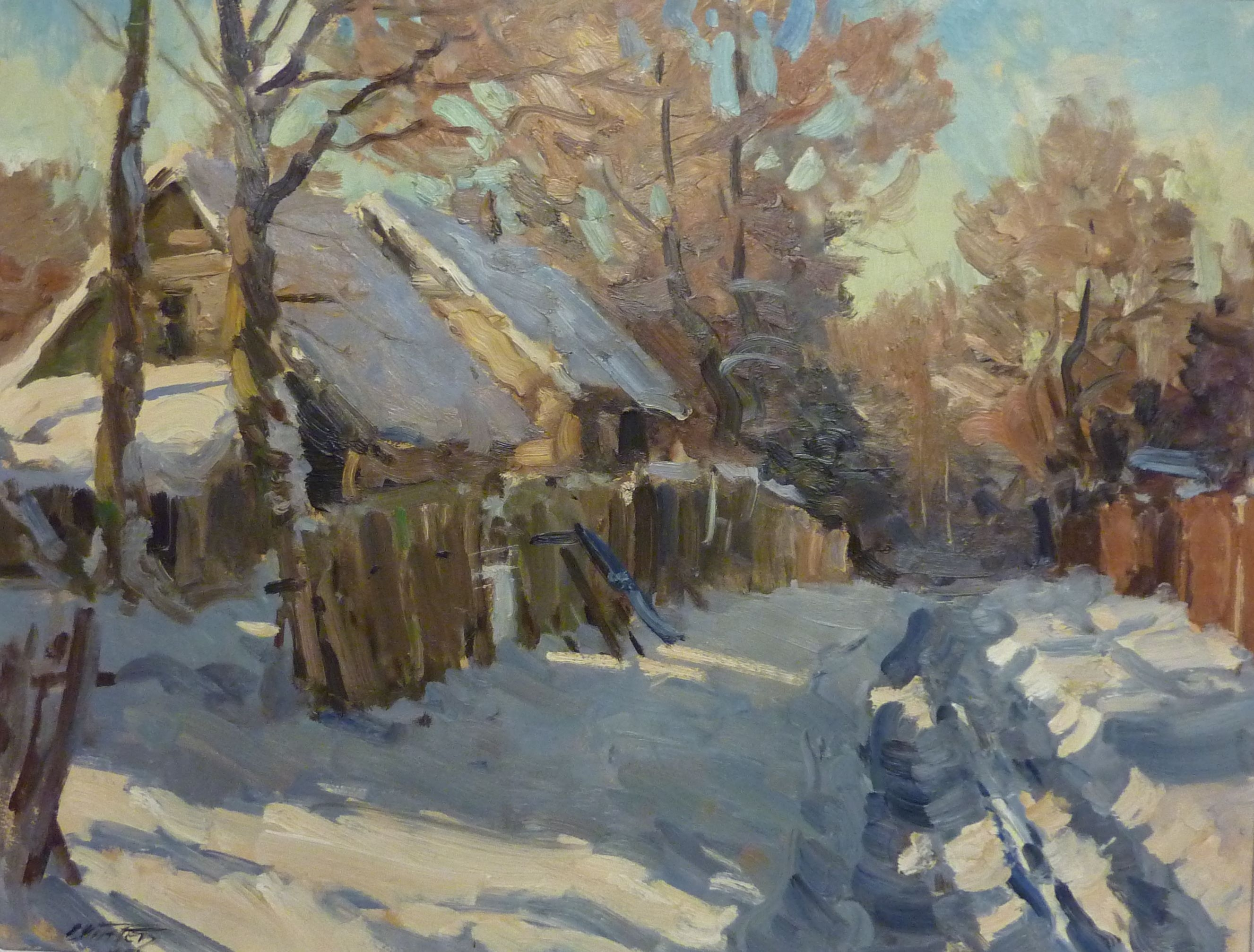
Edgars Vinters, Winter sun in Līči near lake "Juglas ezers", Oil on cardboard; 76 x 96 cm, 1970 (Hans Joachim Gerber collection)

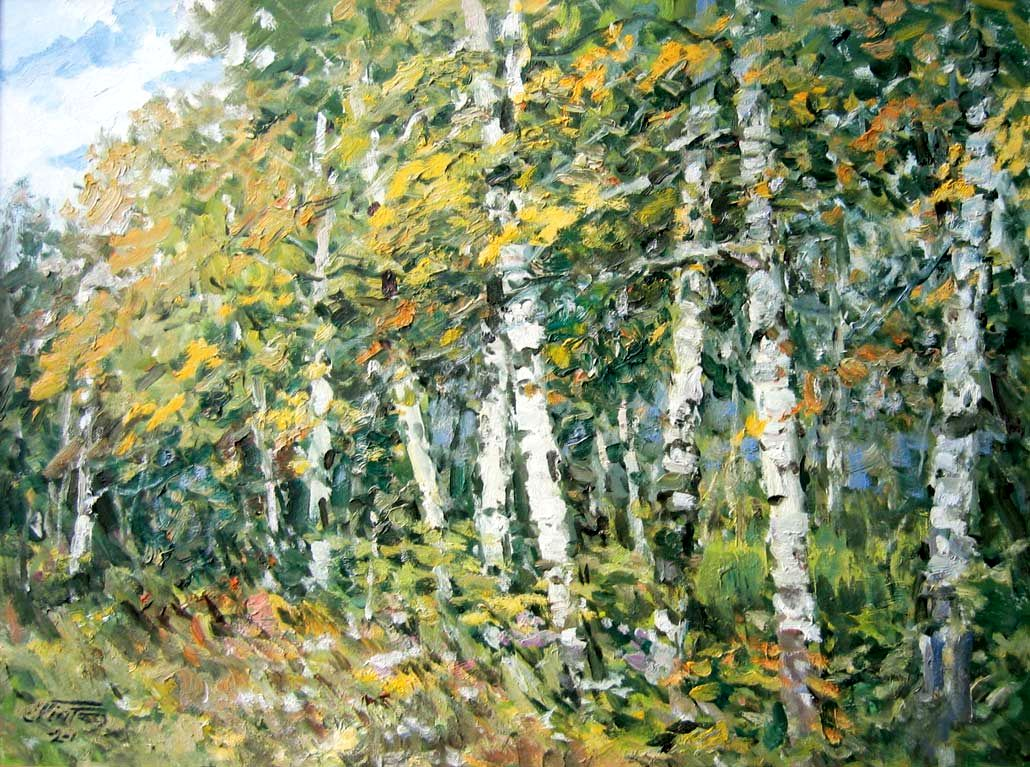
Edgars Vinters, My birch trees in summer, Oil on cardboard 65 x 87 cm, 2001 (Hans Joachim Gerber collection)

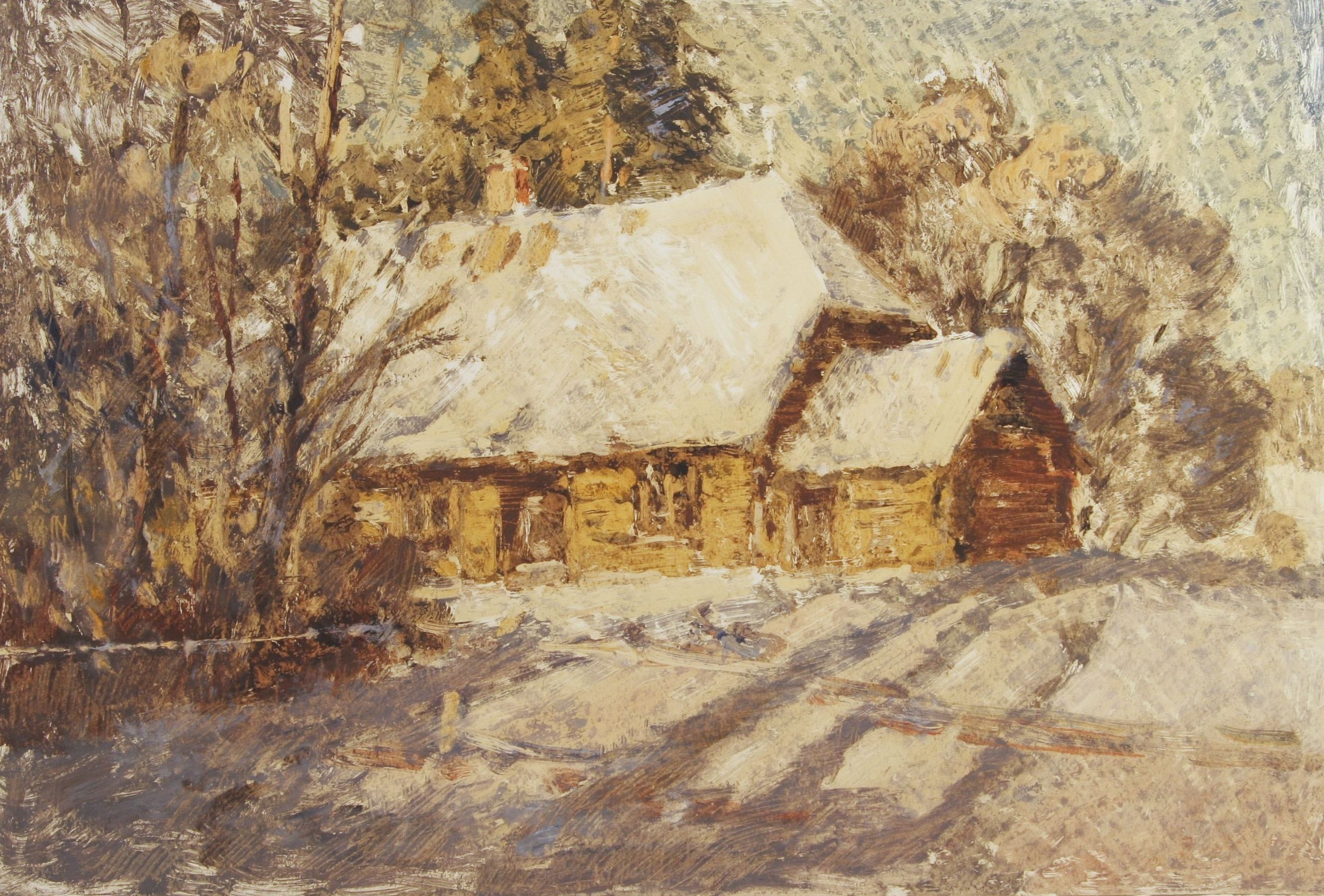
Edgars Vinters, House "Braki" of poet Rūdolfs Blaumanis in Winter, Monotype, 43 x 61, 1971 (Hans Joachim Gerber collection)

== Sources ==
- Hans Joachim Gerber, Ojārs Spārītis: Der lettische Maler Edgars Vinters. Editor: Zvaigzne ABC, Riga 2009. (ISBN 978-9934-0-0755-2; Illustrated biography, German language).
- Hanss Joahims Gerbers, Ojārs Spārītis: Gleznotājs Edgars Vinters. Editor: Zvaigzne ABC, Riga 2009. (ISBN 978-9934-0-0756-9; The Latvian edition of the biography).
- Günter Grass, Ojārs Spārītis, Hans Joachim Gerber: Es vēlos mājās pārnākt. Edgars Vinters. Editor: Zvaigzne ABC, Riga 2012 (ISBN 978-9934-0-3231-8; Drawings of a soldier; four languages: Latvian / English / German / Russian).
- Hans Joachim Gerber, Ojārs Spārītis: Edgars Vinters - gaisma, krāsas, noskaņas / Licht, Farben, Stimmungen [Latvian and German] Apgāds Zvaizne, Riga 2019, ISBN 978-9934-0-8452-2
