= Latvian Finns =

Ethnic group in Finland

Total population
- At least 3,626 (2021) (Note: I.e., according to Statistics Finland, people in Finland: • whose both parents are Latvian-born, • or whose only known parent was born in Latvia, • or who were born in Latvia and whose parents' countries of birth are unknown. Thus, for example, people with one Finnish parent and one Latvian parent or people with more distant Latvian ancestry are not included in this country-based non-ethnic figure. Also, Latvian-born adoptees' backgrounds are determined by their adoptive parents, not by their biological parents.)

Regions with significant populations
- Greater Helsinki, Åland, Turku

Languages
- Finnish, Latvian, Russian, Swedish

Latvian Finns (Finnish: latvialaiset Suomessa; Latvian: Somijas latvieši) are people of full or partial Latvian descent residing in Finland. In 2021, there were 3,626 people with a close Latvian background in Finland. 3,023 speak Latvian in Finland as of 2021. In 2006 there were 252 Russian speakers in Finland who were born in Latvia.

546 Latvians live in Helsinki, 400 in Vantaa, 347 in Espoo, 249 in Turku and over 100 in Mariehamn, Rauma and Salo. The highest proportion of Latvians are found in the Åland islands. In Vårdö, they make up over 8% of the population, over 5% in Föglö, 4% in Geta, 3% in Lumparland, 2% in Finström, Eckerö and Hammarland and 1% in Mariehamn, Jomala, Lemland and Saltvik.

== Notable people ==
- Angelika Kallio (born 1972), a model
- Salomon Klass (1907–1985), a military officer
- Elviss Krastiņš (born 1994), a volleyball player
- Janis Rozentāls (1866–1916), a painter
- Schauman, a noble family
- Teuvo Tulio (1912–2000), a film director and actor
- Edgar Vaalgamaa (1912–2003), a pastor and ethnologist
- Nils Veinbergs (born 2007), a professional footballer

== See also ==
- Finland–Latvia relations
- Latvian diaspora
- Immigration to Finland
