= The White and the Black =

1925 painting by Aleksandra Beļcova

The White and the black
- Baltā un melnā (Latvian)
- Artist: Aleksandra Beļcova
- Year: 1925
- Medium: oil on canvas
- Dimensions: 100 cm × 120 cm (39 in × 47 in)
- Location: Latvian National Museum of Art; Riga

The White and the black (Latvian: Baltā un melnā) is a painting by Latvian artist Aleksandra Beļcova from 1925.

The picture is from the early period of the artist and is among her most famous paintings.

The picture was painted with oil paints and is sized 100x120 cm. The picture is owned by the Latvian National Museum of Art in Riga.

== Analysis ==
It shows two women – a black girl in the foreground and white woman on a sofa, wearing a tunic and holding a fan in her right hand. The woman on the couch is Biruta Ozolina, wife of the Italian ambassador to Thailand, Amadori. Together with his family, he often visited Latvia.

The painting was created at a time when European art was at the crossroads of New Realism, Art Deco, and Neorealism. The picture presents a visual reality and the realistic forms of representation that followed Cubism and the abstract experiments of the early 20th century. A trend to realism was typical throughout Europe in the 1920s and 1930s.
