= Francis Rudolph =

English painter

Francis Rudolph (Latvian: Rūdolfs Peders; 1921–2005) was an English painter of Latvian origin.

== Life in Europe ==
Rūdolfs Peders was born in 1921 in Ventspils, Latvia.

In 1944, during the Nazi occupation of Latvia, he was expelled from Art School for sympathising with "Communists and Jews" and forcefully conscripted into the German Army. While serving on the Eastern Front he deserted and made his way back to Latvia where following the end of the war he was transported to England as a volunteer worker in 1947.

== Life in England ==
Following his move to England, Rudolph eventually settled in Tooting, South London. In 1948 he took up a position as porter at Springfield Mental Hospital, Tooting. There he remained for many years while also broadening his artistic fields.

Whilst having a more technical background the job of porter allowed him to pursue regular art classes to refine his artistic skills; becoming a member of the Hesketh Hubbard Art Society and exhibiting at venues such as the Chelsea Art Exhibition, Toynbee Art Club and The Mall Galleries. Rudolph was a prolific painter of nude life studies and also produced many scenes of the City of London with the "Painting in London" group.

His work is in various collections of note, including the Ashmolean Museum, Oxford and Gregynog Hall..

Francis Rudolph died in 2005 while living in Herondale Avenue, London, SW18.
