= Nele Zirnite =

Lithuanian artist (born 1959)

Nele Zirnite (born May 27, 1959, in Lithuania) is a graphic artist, painter, associated printmaking professor and Guildmaster of the Etching Guild in Latvia.

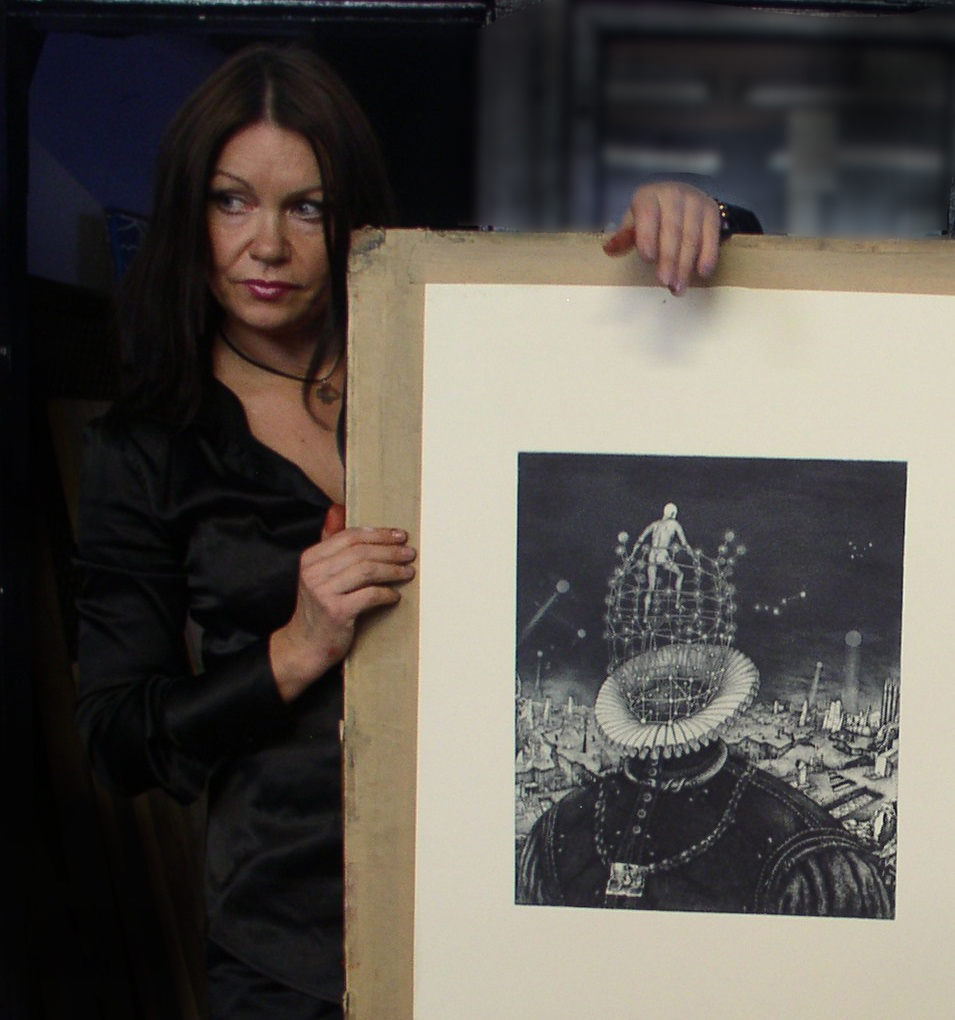
Nele Zirnite holding the print "Ruler", 2007.

She studied graphic arts at the Vilnius Academy of Arts (previously State Art Institute of Lithuania) specializing in printmaking. In 1982, however, she moved on to study at the Art Academy of Latvia in Riga and earned her Bachelor of Fine Art degree in 1984. Zirnite has also acquired qualifications in Graphic arts, Printmaking techniques and Pedagogy. In 2000, she attained a Master of Fine Arts degree at the Art Academy of Latvia. She has been making impacts in the development of etching techniques by conducting experiments and working as a pedagogue in the field. Since 2003, Zirnite has been an associate professor within the Art Department at the Latvian Christian Academy. She is an active participant and board member of the Chamber of Graphic Art and leads the Etching studio in the Union of Latvian Artists where she has been a member since 1988. From 1995 to 2003, she has been a lecturer at the Graphic Arts Department at the Art Academy of Latvia.

Since 2010, she has led the Etching Guild association, which she initiated and authored the concept. She manages different ongoing international graphic arts exhibitions and projects, such as Strong Water (since 2010), which involves a range of distinguished, world-renowned artists as well as young professional artists from all over the world.

In 2015 Nele Zirnite was invited to participate at the “Conversations of Culture” event at the D elegation of the European Union in the United States of America where an etching workshop and a solo exhibition Army of Beauty was held.

In 2017 the artist was chosen for the FIRST PRIZE ITALIAN GRAPHIC ARTS 2017 (Primo Premio Grafica Italiana) award which is granted by a personal exhibition, organized by the NATIONAL ITALIAN ENGRAVERS ASSOCIATION.
