= Miervaldis Polis =

Latvian painter and performance artist (1948–2026)

Miervaldis Polis (23 July 1948 – 21 February 2026) was a Latvian painter and performance artist. In the early 1970s, he and Līga Purmale, his wife at the time, started a new trend of photorealism in Latvian painting. In the early 1980s, he turned to performance art, one of his most notable performances being The Bronze Man, wherein he roamed the streets of Riga, Latvia, in a bronze suit, covered from head to toe in bronze paint. In the 1990s, after Latvia regained independence, Polis became known as the Latvian "court painter," receiving commissions to paint the portraits of the Latvian elite, including former presidents Guntis Ulmanis and Vaira Vīķe-Freiberga.

Polis died on 21 February 2026, at the age of 77.
