= Romans Suta =

Latvian artist (1896–1944)

- Born: 28 April 1896; Dzērbene parish, Kreis Wenden, Governorate of Livonia, Russian Empire
- Died: 14 July 1944 (aged 48); Tbilisi, Georgian SSR
- Known for: Painting, Graphic art, interior and stage design
- Movement: Modernism
- Spouse: Aleksandra Beļcova

Romans Suta (28 April 1896 – 14 July 1944) was a Latvian painter, graphic artist, stage designer and art theoretician.

== Biography ==
Suta was born on the road in Dzērbene parish near Cēsis while his mother Natālija traveled from Cēsis to Kleķerkrogs. His father was Jēkabs Suta, local merchant. Romans Suta spent his childhood in Valka where his father owned a shop. He studied in a Realschule in Pskov but never graduated because he together with his brother fled to Riga in 1910 and about a year they worked on a merchant ships as cabinboys.

In 1913 he decided to become a painter and started studies in Jūlijs Madernieks studio in Riga where his sister already studied. Soon after he was accepted into Riga City Art school where he studied under Vilhelms Purvītis and Jānis Tilbergs. During this period he became close friend with Jēkabs Kazaks one of the first Latvian modernists. He was forced to left Art school in 1915 when due to First World War his family evacuated to St. Petersburg. While in Russia, Suta resumed his studies in Penza city Art school where he met many other Latvian painters. Among them were Konrāds Ubāns, Jēkabs Kazaks and Voldemārs Tone. It was also here in Penza where Suta met Russian painter Aleksandra Belcova his future wife.

In August 1917 Romans Suta together with Jēkabs Kazaks enlisted into 5th. Zemgale Rifleman regiment. Suta was in the Petrograd during October revolution. While in Petrograd he met several young Russian artists like Nathan Altman and Kuzma Petrov-Vodkin. In December 1917 Suta returned to Latvia and in 1919 became member of Expressionist group which in 1920 transformed to Riga artists group.

In 1922 Romans Suta married Aleksandra Beļcova and they traveled through Dresden and Berlin to Paris, where their daughter Tatiana was born. In Paris he made the acquaintance of A. Ozanfant, Le Corbusier, and others. After returning to Latvia they introduced the Latvian public to ideas of Cubism and Constructivism and Suta opened a porcelain painting studio Baltars in 1924. In 1926 Suta left Riga Artists group and joined the Artist society Zaļā Vārna In 1928 Baltars studio was closed due to financial problems. From 1929 until 1934 Suta worked in the Riga Peoples university as a lecturer of drawing and painting. In 1934 he opened his own studio in Riga. In the late 1930s Sutas marriage with Beļcova broke apart when it became clear that Suta had several love affairs already since the 1920s.

After Latvian occupation by Soviet Union in 1940 Suta started to work in Riga Film Studio as a Chief designer for a movie Kaugurieši. In late June 1941 when Suta was working on a movie "Melancholic Waltz" about composer Emīls Dārziņš, he was ordered to evacuate to Soviet Union with all his staff. He lived in Moscow, later in Almaty, and finally settled in Tbilisi where in 1943 he was arrested and accused for forgering a food vouchers. After a show trial he was executed by firing squad on 14 July 1944. Suta was posthumously rehabilitated in 1959.

The former flat of Aleksandra Belcova and Romans Suta on Elizabetes street 57A-26 in Riga has been turned into the memorial museum and art gallery Sutas un Beļcovas Muzejs with over 4,000 works of art by the couple, mostly donated by their daughter Tatjana Suta.

== Art ==
Suta mostly painted still lifes and figural compositions. After the first experiments in Modernism, he turned to a more realistic manner of representation. He is considered initiator and developer of a national constructive style, especially in interior design. Also he was a prominent figure and active protagonist of modernist trends in Latvian art.
