= Ludolfs Liberts =

Ludolfs Liberts (3 April 1895 – 11 March 1959 in the United States) was a Latvian set designer and painter, who taught at the Latvian Academy of Arts.

He served in World War I as an artilleryman.

He was married to opera singer Amanda Liberte-Rebаne.

He left Latvia in 1944, moving to Austria, then Germany. In 1950 he moved to the United States.

In 2024-2025, an exhibition was dedicated to Liberts' work at the Latvian National Museum of Art in Riga, "The hypnotic brilliance of Art Deco".
