= Rudolf Ray Rapaport =

Latvian painter (1891–1984)

Rudolf Ray (April 13, 1891 – May 1984) was a prolific expressionist painter who worked and exhibited in Austria, France, the United States, Mexico, India and Britain.

Born Rudolf Rapaport in Latvia, he later used the name Rudolf Ray. He trained in Vienna, where his work was praised by Oskar Kokoschka and the city's art critics. He arrived in New York City in 1942. From 1958 to 1960 he lived in Almora, India, and from 1960 to 1974 he lived in Mexico, died in London.

In 1927 he married Vienna-born painter Katharina Zirner, who died in childbirth in Kathmandu later that year. Their son, Martin, died aged 17 in Vienna in 1944. In the 1960s Rudolf lived in Tepotzlan, Mexico, with his wife Joyce.

== Exhibitions ==
- 1934 Galerie Neumann und Salzer, Wien
- 1936 Maski Gallery, Tel Aviv
- 1944 Peggy Guggenheim, The Art of This Century gallery, New York
- 1944 – 1955 Willard Gallery, New York
- 1955 Corcoran Gallery of Art, Washington
- 1956 Jehangir Gallery, Bombay
- 1959 All India Fine Arts and Crafts Society, New Delhi
- 1961 Antonio Souza Gallery, Mexico City
- 1962 Grand Central Moderns Gallery, New York
- 1966 Austrian Culture Institute, New York
- 1969 Palacio de Bellas Artes, Mexico City
- 1970 Retrospective, Vienna Secession, Wien
- 2019 Retrospective, Suppan Fine Arts, Wien

== Public Collections ==
- Peggy Guggenheim Collection, Venedig
- Metropolitan Museum of Art, New York
- MUMOK Museum, Wien
- Harvard Art Museums, Fogg Art Museum, Boston
- Albertina Museum, Wien
- Tel Aviv Museum, Tel Aviv
- Belvedere Museum, Wien
- Philadelphia Museum of Art, Philadelphia
