= Līga Purmale =

Latvian artist (born 1948)

- Born: 4 October 1948 (age 77); Dundaga Latvian SSR, Soviet Union
- Known for: Painting
- Style: Photoism

Līga Purmale (born 4 October 1948 in Dundaga, Latvian SSR) is a Latvian painter. At a young age she moved to Riga from the Latvian countryside to study painting, first at the Jānis Rozentāls Art High School and then at the Latvian Academy of Art. In the 1970s she and Miervaldis Polis, who was her husband at the time, started a new trend of photorealism in Latvian painting. She currently lives and works in Riga.
