= Anda Skadmane =

Latvian painter

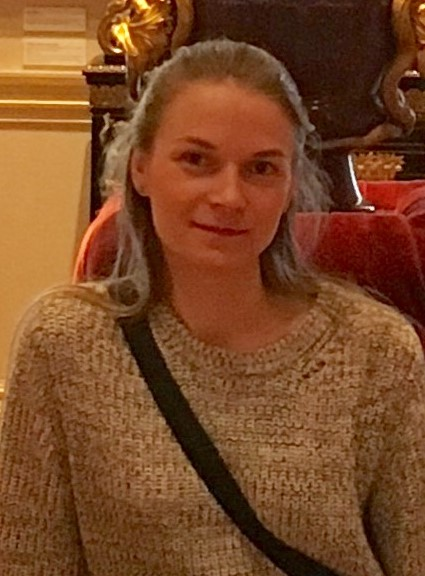
- Skadmane in 2017
- Born: March 19, 1990; Riga, Latvia
- Education: Art Academy of Latvia
- Known for: Painting, linocut, lithography
- Notable work: "Rumbula" (2003) locates at The Elie Wiesel Archive, Howard Gotlieb Archival Research Center, Boston University, United States

Anda Skadmane (born 19 March 1990, in Riga, Latvia) is a Latvian artist.

== Biography ==
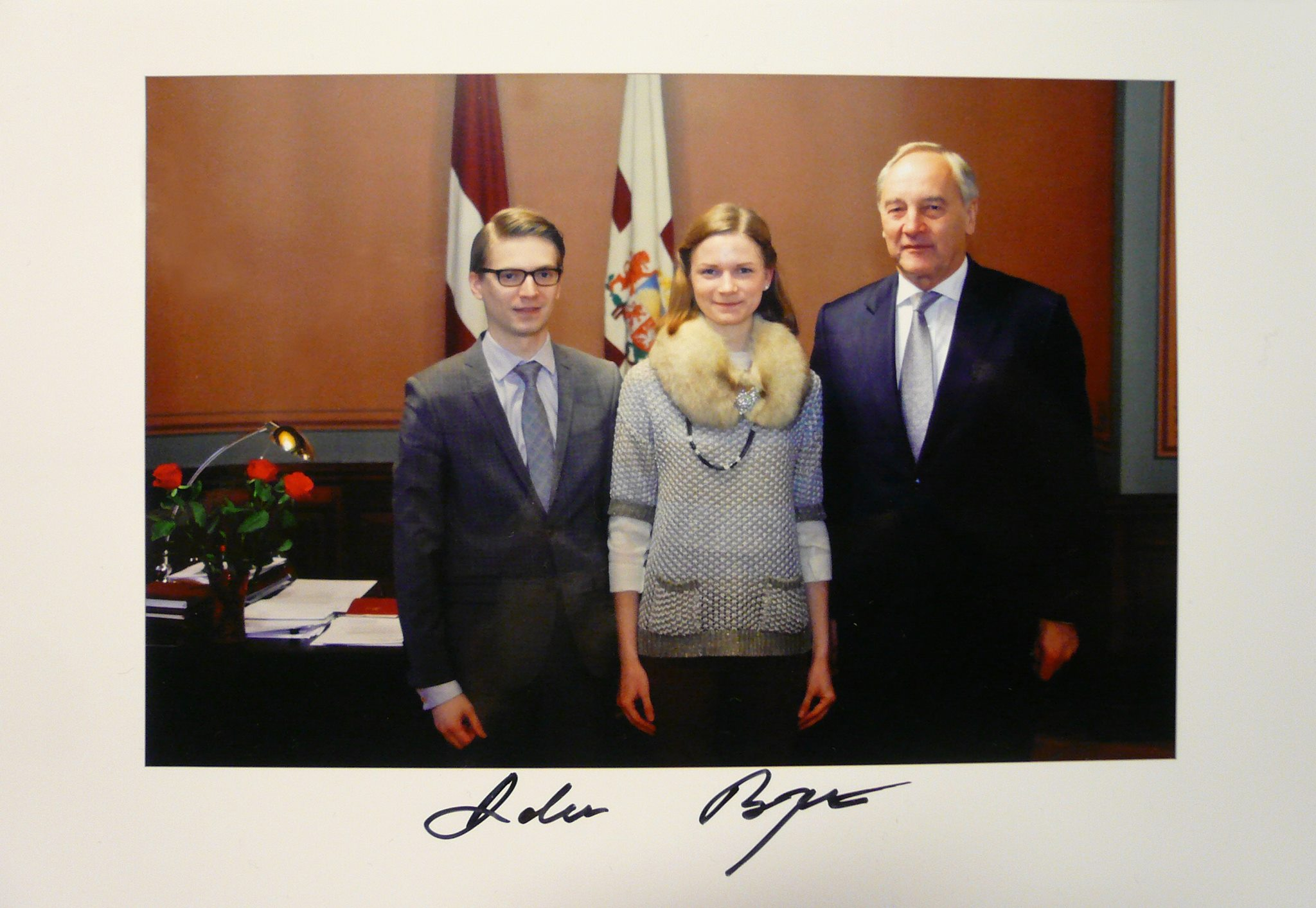
Skadmane with brother Marcis and Latvian president Andris Bērziņš.

Anda Skadmane is a daughter of Latvian Jānis Skadmanis (12 January 1955 - 21 November 2013) and Zinta Skadmane; Marcis Liors Skadmanis is her brother. She attended the Grammar school of Nordic languages and Janis Rozentāl Art High School. She studied at the Art Academy of Latvia from 2011 to 2018, she holds Master of Fine Arts (MFA) degree in Painting and Bachelor of Fine Arts (MFA) degree in Textile Arts. Skadmane's twin sister Daina Skadmane and her father Jānis Skadmanis lost their lives in the Zolitūde shopping centre roof collapse on 21 November 2013, when in total 54 people were killed and dozens injured.

In 2014, in response to the request of the Zolitude Society 21/11, Latvijas Pasts issued a commemorative envelope devoted to the victims of Zolitude tragedy, and Anda designed the commemorative envelope and postmark.

In January 2018, The Latvian Television, LTV1, "Aculiecinieks" created a short documentary film "Twin Sisters" (Latvian: Dvīņu māsas) dedicated to the memory of Daina Skadmane. The film explored the life and art of Anda and Daina Skamanes.
