= Arturs Akopjans =

Latvian painter

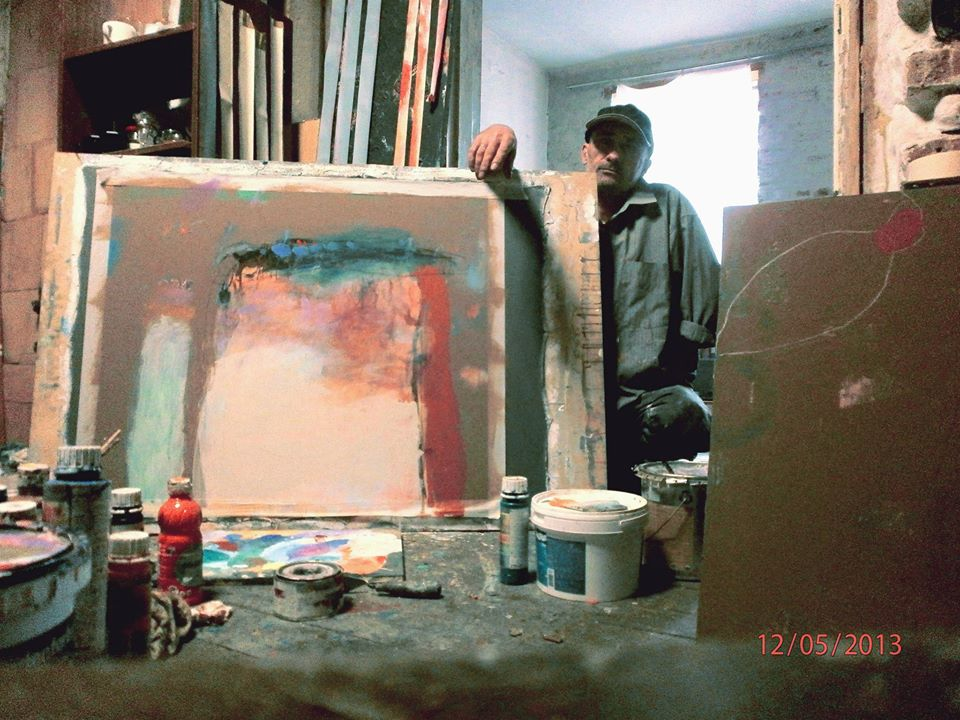
- Born: Արթուր Հակոբյան; 31 October 1969
- Known for: Painting
- Notable work: "Still life with vase", "Cat's birthday", "Schoolgirl", "Blueberries"
- Movement: Abstract art, Figurative art

Arturs Akopjans (Armenian: Արթուր Հակոբյան, born October 31 1969) is a Latvian painter of Armenian origin.

== Biography ==
Akopjans became interested in drawing at the age of 6. He studied at Terlemezian Art College, then (1996) graduated Art Academy of Latvia, Department of painting. He moved to Riga from Yerevan in 1989. Since 2000 he had numerous solo and group exhibitions in Latvia, Austria and Denmark. In 2005 Akopjans participated at 2 Art exhibitions at the Arsenāls – Fine Arts Museum, Riga, Latvia. In 2012 solo exhibitions in three countries: Novogornaja and Belayevo in Moscow, Russia, Am Roten HOF in Vienna, Austria, and Tornby in Denmark, brought him international acclaim. Akopjans main expression is the color and abstract characters. "The absolute sense of color and temperament given by nature allows the artist to master and experience them", writes DELFI. According to Akopjans, "everything is acceptable when it comes to art". He is not holding on to a particular concept, but depicts "a particular feeling of the moment, mood and thoughts".

== Awards ==
- 2000 - "Riga in Contemporary Art", Riga City Council Prize for the best work.
