= Ilgvars Zalāns =

Latvian painter

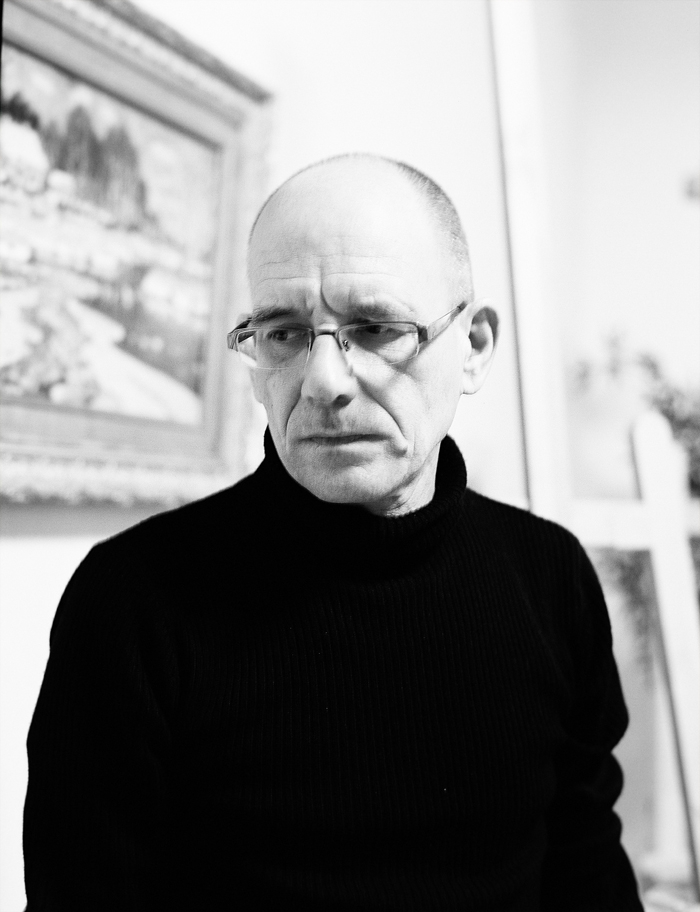
- Born: 24 September 1962 (age 63)
- Known for: Painting
- Movement: Expressionism
- Website: artmajeur.com/zalans

Ilgvars Zalāns (born 24 September 1962) is a Latvian painter. He is generally identified as an Expressionist and is one of the most influential contemporary expressionist painters in northern Europe. In the course of his career he was influenced by Gutai group, Fluxus movement, and other modern art activists and has turned more to the scene of action-painting. He has stated that his artistic approach is guided by a focus on "images and motifs that are fundamental, archetypal, and universal in human experience, as opposed to those that are socially determined." Since 2007 Ilgvars Zalans had a 33-country world tour with his action-painting performances. In the past years he has actively taken the opportunities offered by artist residences, thereby traveling almost half of the world.

Lately, his art is better known in Indonesia, Malaysia, China, and Japan than in Latvia, because he has lived and worked while travelling abroad extensively. In his art Zalans focuses on images and motifs that are fundamental, archetypal, and universal in human experience, as opposed to those that are socially determined. The exhibitions of the artist regularly take place in Latvia and abroad. In 2015 his works were showcased at the Scope Basel and Scope Miami Beach art shows during the ArtBasel weeks and at Art Copenhagen, the Scandinavia's International Art Fair for Contemporary & Modern Art.
