= Mārtiņš Krūmiņš =

Latvian artist

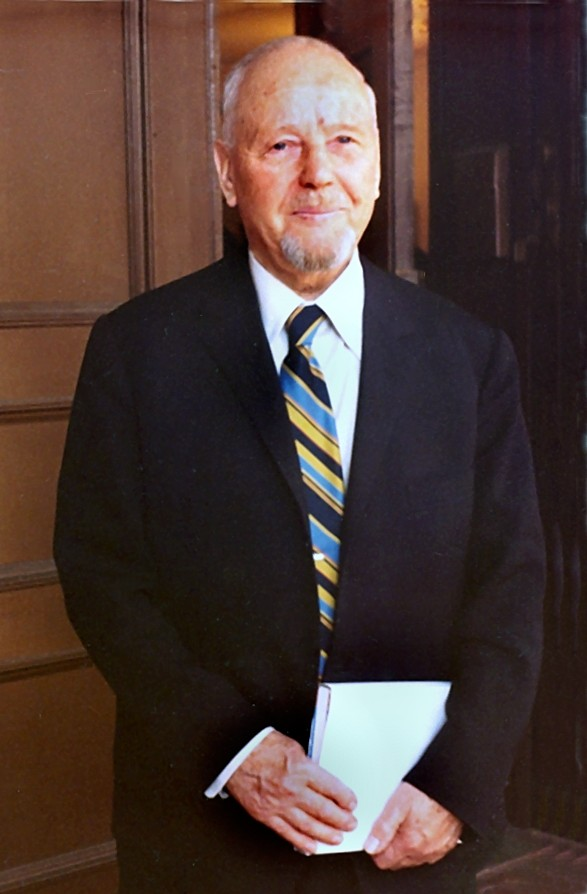
Mārtiņš Krūmiņš at an exhibit of his paintings in New York City

Mārtiņš Krūmiņš (March 2, 1900 – 1992) was a Latvian-American Impressionist painter. He left Latvia after World War II and came to the United States in 1950. "Mārtiņš Krūmiņš ... belongs to those artists of his generation, who amidst the changing trends of contemporary art, after thirty years in exile and emigration, as still basically close to and developing the traditions of their homeland art – of the 'Latvian or Riga School'".

== Early life ==
Krūmiņš was born in 1900 in Riga, Latvia. His father owned rental cottages along the Baltic Sea and engaged in various forms of business. Mārtiņš' childhood memories of the seashore, the cloudy northern days, and the boats and work of local fishermen influenced his entire life and work.

Krūmiņš attended a traditional elementary school in Riga, and when the First World War broke out the family moved to the provincial town of Valmiera to escape the advancing front. As the front again approached he moved to Valka in Northeast Latvia, and when living conditions deteriorated there he moved to Irkutsk in Siberia to live with his half sisters and their husbands. Krūmiņš graduated from the Irkutsk Commercial School but as the communist regime came closer and civil ware broke out between the Red and White Armies, a Latvian regiment was formed under the protection of the Allied forces which he joined. The regiment was ordered to Siberia, which led Krūmiņš to exotic places, different cultures, and ports in China, Korea, India, the Suez, the Mediterranean, and North Atlantic.

== Years of art studies, 1929–1942 ==
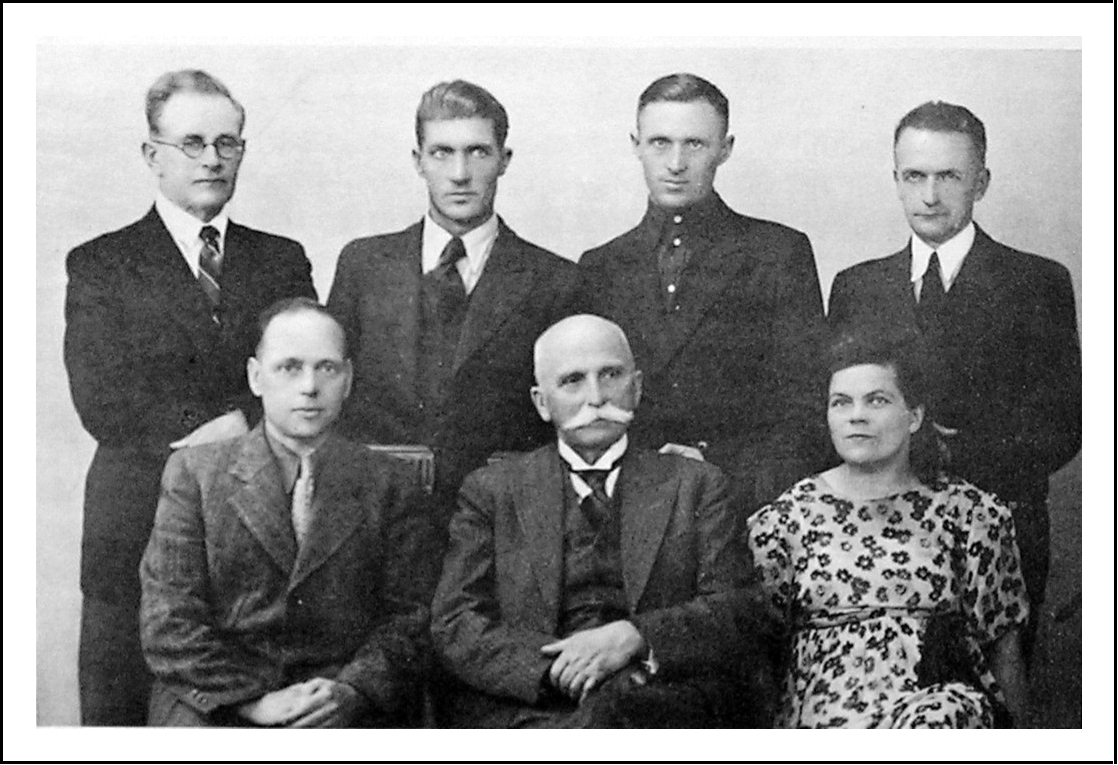
Master Class Graduates at the Latvian Art Academy, 1942. Krūmiņš is seated first on left. Seated in the middle is Professor Vilhelms Purvitis

Krumiņš was influenced by the Russian emigre painter, Sergei Vinogradov and studied at Vinogradov's studio from 1929 to 1935. In 1935 Kruminš enrolled in the Latvian Academy of Art and was admitted to Vilhelms Purvītis' masterclass of landscape painting. The Soviet occupation took place in 1940–41 and the communists made changes in the management of the Academy and the German occupation followed in 1941 through 1945. In 1942 M. Krumiņš earned the title of an academic "artist-painter" for his diploma work Purvciems.

== As a refugee in Germany, 1944–1949 ==
On June 14, 1941, the Soviets deported thousands and thousands of people to Siberia. When the Germans came in, the German gendarmes were arresting people on the street. In October 1944 Krūmiņš took his roll of canvases and sailed from Liepāja in Latvia to Danzig in Germany with hundreds of other refugees on the same ship. As Hitler's Reich collapsed, Krūmiņš, as a displaced person, settled in a refugee camp in Augsburg. This was the beginning of productive years as an artist, despite the poor quality and scarcity of painting materials that could be purchased after the war in Germany. J. Silins wrote in his book about Mārtiņš Krūmiņš; "Krumins was well recognized by the German art critics for the simple reason that he was an articulate artist, different from Cezannists, from German and French Expressionists, Surrealists and adepts of Fauvism. A German art critic, H. Kellenbenz, placed the Latvian painter amidst the Western Impressionists with his very personal and restrained palette. Several years later, the art critic of The New York Times judged the same pictures differently; Martins Krumins, whose wintery landscapes are expressionistic."

Mārtiņš Krūmiņš took part in exhibitions organized by the International Refugee Organization in Amsterdam, The Hague and Paris and also taught at the Latvian University Extension in Augsburg. In 1950 he sailed for the United States.

== In the United States, 1950–1992 ==
In 1950 Krūmiņš arrived in New York and began a difficult process of adjusting to life in the United States. He did not speak English and now had to secure a job to earn a living and to continue his creative work. Compared to the poor quality of artist's materials available in the refugee camp, the canvases and oil paints available in the United States benefited the quality of his work. He passed the examinations in architectural drawing and worked until his retirement for a company in Elizabeth, New Jersey which, incidentally, has a collection of his paintings at their headquarters in Pennsylvania.

Krūmiņš has had many individual exhibits of his work throughout the United States, as well as in Canada, Sweden, and Latvia. His work has been exhibited in many joint exhibits with other Latvian artists. Some of these were organized by the American-Latvian Association Culture Fund and the New York Latvian Artists Group. He was also a friend of Latvian-American Artist Lucia Peka, who also lived in New Jersey.

== Gallery ==
Winter Evening (Lat. Ziemas vakars) 1945

Early Morning Before Fishing (Lat. Ziemas vakars) 1945

Belmar Beach (Lat. Belmaras pludmalē) 1953

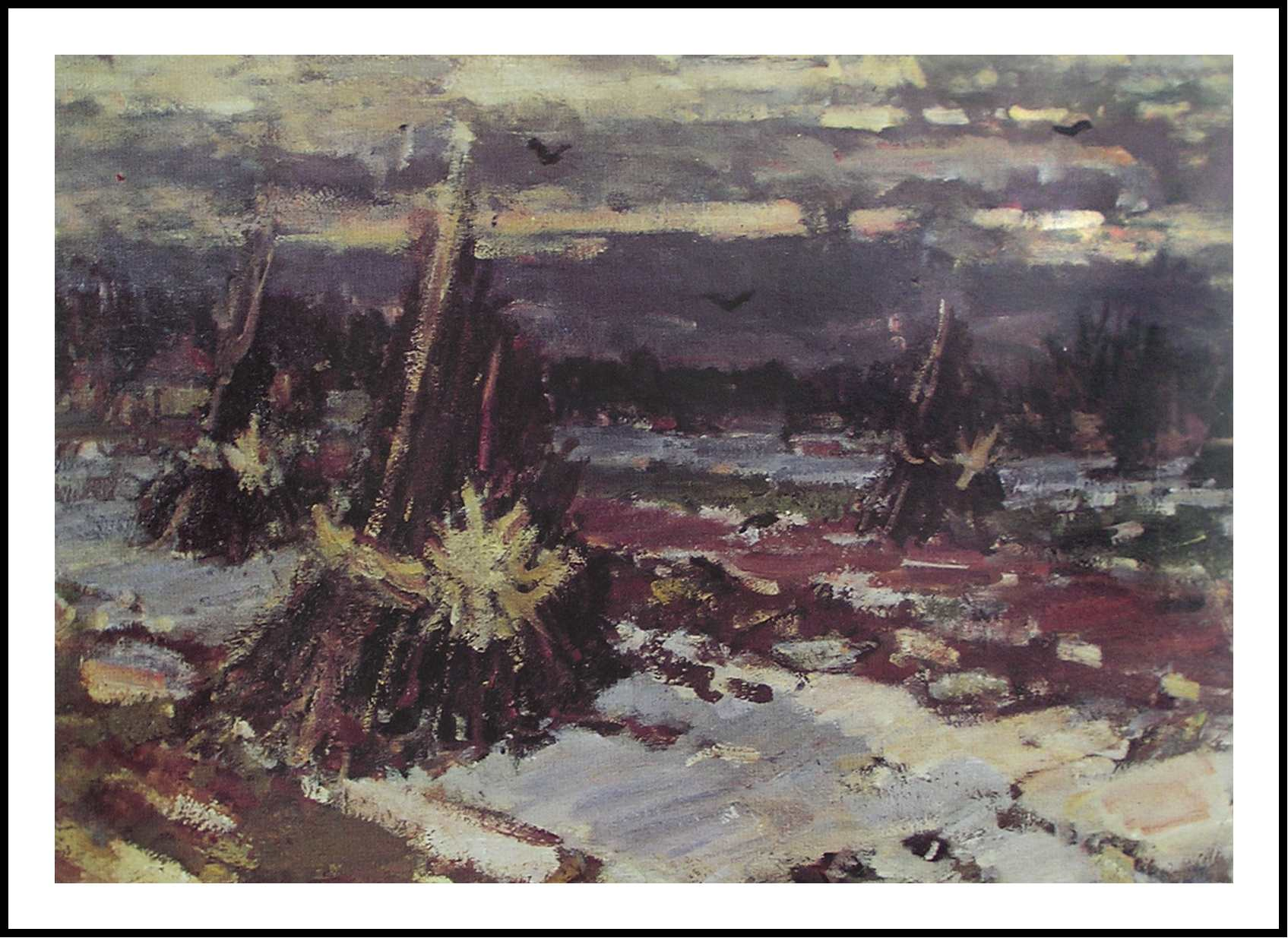
Stacks of Bean Stalks (Lat. Pupu statiņi) 1957

The Peat Digger (Lat. Kūdras racējs) 1966

Clearing in Winter (Lat. Izcirtums ziemā) 1967

The Autumn Mood (Lat. Vakara noskaņā) 1978

== Biography ==
- Jānis Silin̦š, 1980: Mārtiņš Krūmiņš. New York: Latvian Humanities and Social Science Association
