= Tatyana Palchuk =

Latvian artist (born 1954)

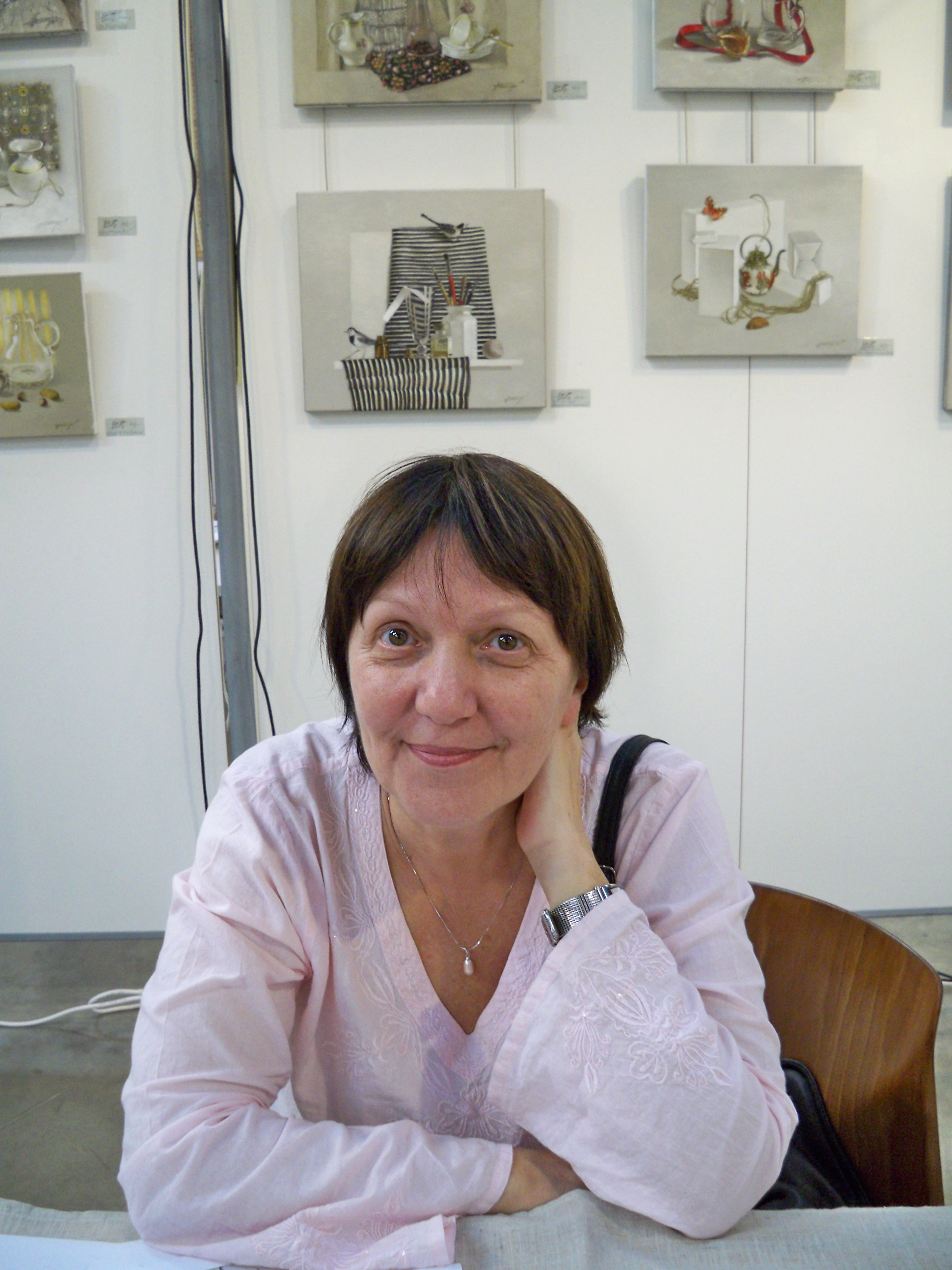
Tatyana Palchuk (2008)

Tatyana Palchuk Rikane (Latvian: Tatjana Palčuka Rikāne; born 1954 in Riga, Latvian SSR) is a Latvian artist.

== Early life ==
Her father, a soldier, died shortly after World War II and she was raised by her mother. Her family had little financial resources and her mother struggled to take care of them.

From 1967 to 1973 she studied at the Jānis Rozentāls Art High School, where she received college-level education. From 1975 to 1981 she studied at the Art Academy of Latvia, in the department of painting. From 1984 to 1987 she attended the USSR Academy of Arts for her postgraduate studies. She studied with Western school academics such as marine painter Eduards Kalnins (Eduard Kalnins). Palchuk studied the European academic school of painting. In 2003 she received an MA in Fine Art and Painting.

== Career ==
Her artistic productions are influenced by the Italian Renaissance (14th–16th century), the Northern Renaissance (15th–16th century) and the French Illuminated Manuscripts (15th century). She is a member of the Latvian Art Union. She teaches painting, drawing and composition and her students work in many countries. Palchuk regularly participates in exhibitions, including ten solo exhibitions and numerous group exhibitions. Her paintings are housed in both public and private collections.
