= Teodors Ūders =

Latvian artist

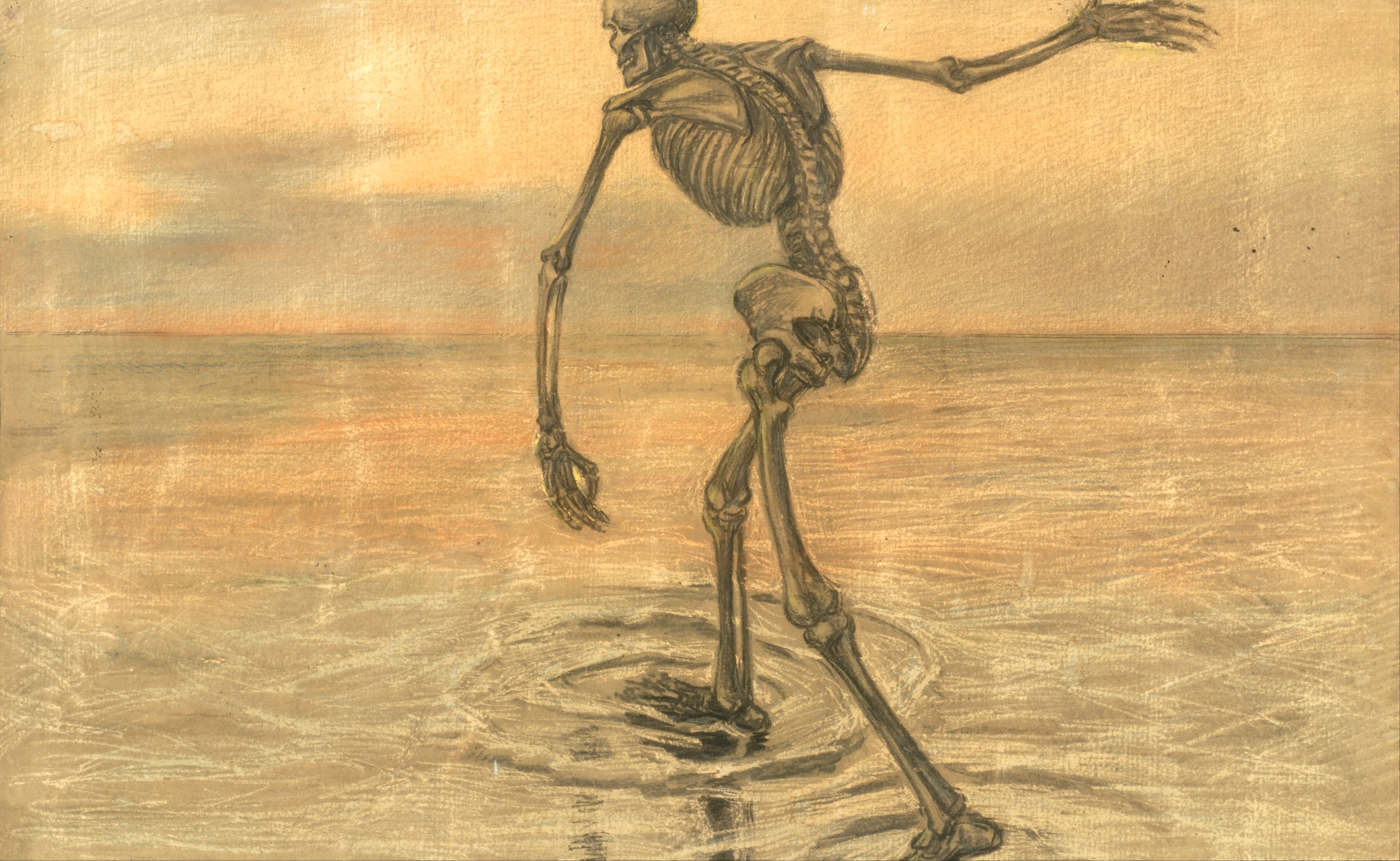
Death, by Teodors Ūders, 1914

Teodors Ūders (3 May 1868 – 20 August 1915) was a Latvian artist.

== Biography ==
Ūders was born in Valmiera. He had a colourful career; ignoring the wishes of his parents that he become a farmer, he left to become a cook on a ship in 1884 and would spend the next six years at sea. Returning to Riga, he then spent three years as a reservist in a Guards unit in Saint Petersburg, after which he committed himself to personal studies of philosophy until 1897. He then spent two years at the present-day Saint Petersburg Art and Industry Academy, studying art. For several years he then traveled throughout the Russian Empire with his wife, earning a living painting portraits and landscapes. In 1905 he returned to his hometown Valmiera in present-day Latvia and took up position as an art teacher and would stay there until his death in 1915. Disregarded by the local bourgeoisie, his art wasn't widely recognised until after his death, as noted with regret by art critic Boris Vipper.

== Bibliography ==
- Pence, Anta (2016). Teodors Ūders. Riga: Neputns. ISBN 978-9934-512-77-3.
