= Aleksandra Beļcova =

Russian artist (1892–1981)

- Born: Александра Бельцова; 17 March 1892; Surazh, Russian Empire (Now Russia)
- Died: 1 February 1981 (aged 88); Riga, Latvian SSR
- Known for: Painting
- Movement: Cubism, realism
- Spouse: Romans Suta (m. 1922)

Aleksandra Mitrofanovna Beļcova (Russian: Бельцова, Александра Митрофановна, 17 March 1892 – 1 February 1981) was a Latvian-Russian painter.

== Biography ==
Aleksandra Beļcova graduated women gymnasium in Novozybkov in 1912. Later she started studies in Penza city art school which she graduated in 1917. While in Penza she met several Latvian painters who studied there as a refugees. Among them were Jēkabs Kazaks, Konrāds Ubāns and Voldemārs Tone. Especially close relationships developed between her and Romans Suta, another Latvian painter who studied in Penza. In 1917 she went to Petrograd and studied in State Free Art Workshop under Nathan Altman. It was in Petrograd where her first solo exhibition was held in 1919. Just after the exhibition she moved to Latvia along with Romans Suta and became a members of the Riga Artists Group. The couple married in 1922 in Riga and after marriage they visited Paris, Berlin and Dresden. In 1923 their daughter Tatiana was born in Paris. In 1925 she painted The White and the Black.

She was involved in the Roller group exhibitions and Riga Graphic Artists Association in the following years. Her paintings were mostly portraits and still lifes, beginning as a Cubist she turned to realism in later years. Her mediums were oil, watercolor, graphic arts and she also painted on porcelain.

Beļcova died on 1 February 1981.

The home of Aleksandra Belcova and Romans Suta in Elizabetes street 57A-26 in Riga is now turned into memorial museum and art gallery.
