= Ādams Alksnis =

Latvian painter

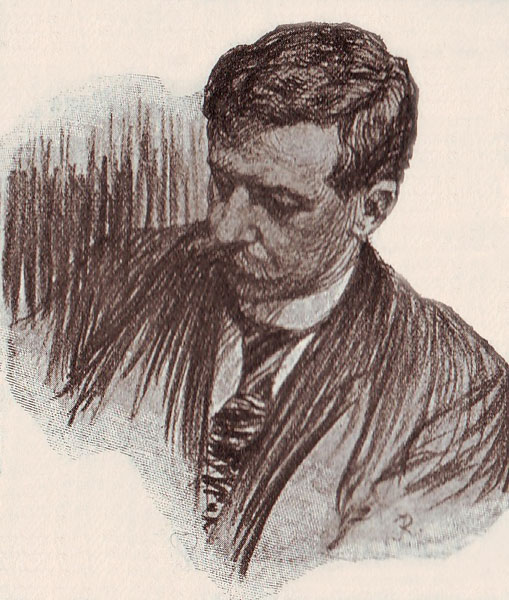
- Ā. Alksnis portrait by Janis Rozentāls
- Born: Ādams Eduards Alksnis; 10 March 1864; Vecalkšņi, Mazsalaca parish (now Valmiera Municipality), Kreis Wolmar, Governorate of Livonia, Russian Empire (Now Latvia)
- Died: 21 March 1897 (aged 33); Riga, Russian Empire (Now Latvia)
- Known for: Painting; Drawing

Ādams Alksnis (10 March 1864 – 21 March 1897) was a Latvian painter. He is one of the first painters who started to paint daily scenes from Latvian peasant life.

== Biography ==
Alksnis was born on 10 March 1864 in Vecalkšņi homestead, Mazsalaca parish (now Valmiera Municipality), Kreis Wolmar, Livonian Governorate however he was raised in Rūjiena where his father opened a book store. He graduated from a local municipal school and traveled to Riga to study art. He studied drawing in technical school of Riga German craftsmen society and later traveled to St. Petersburg. There he started studies in Russian Imperial academy of art in 1883. He studied under Bogdan Willewalde and specialised in military art. In this period he was known as an informal leader and consolidator of Latvian artists in St. Petersburg. He actively participated in the local Latvian artist society Rūķis (Dwarf).

In 1892 he graduated and returned to Latvia. He lived mostly in his native Rūjiena. In 1897 he underwent a minor nose surgery in Riga but died quite suddenly from blood-poisoning on March 21. He was buried in Rūjiena town cemetery.

His artistic legacy consists primarily of drawings and watercolours. There are known only 15 oil paintings. Many of his works are displayed in the Latvian National Museum of Art.

== Gallery ==
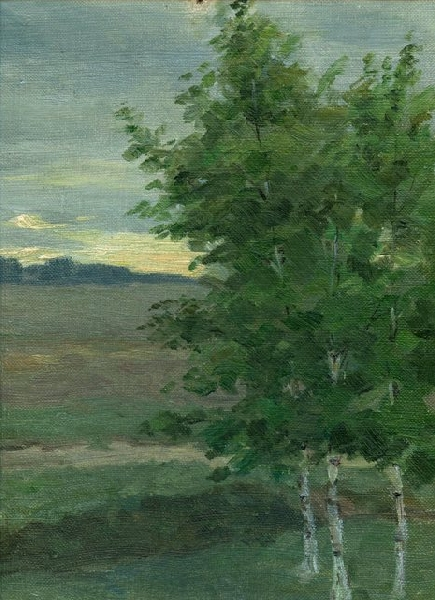
Three birch trees (1890s)

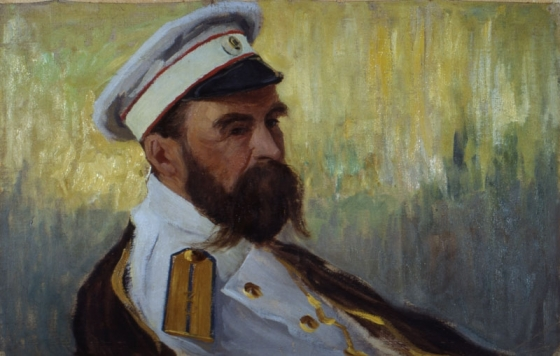
Portrait of a military doctor. (First half of 1890s)
