= Hugo Kārlis Grotuss =

Latvian painter

Hugo Grotuss
- Born: Hugo Kārlis Grotuss; 17 January 1884; Jaunpils parish "Dočkos", Latvia
- Died: 16 January 1951 (aged 66); Dillingen, West Germany
- Known for: Painter
- Notable work: Piones, Ainava ar rudzu statiem, Tulpes, Kemeri Milestibas sala.

Hugo Kārlis Grotuss (17 January 1884 in Jaunpils parish "Dočkos" – 16 January 1951 in Dillingen) was a Latvian painter, classified as a Realist. His paintings and drawings include some of the best known and most popular works in Latvian art.

== Biography ==
He studied in the studio of Jūlijs Madernieks and also in the Central School of Technical Drawing of Saint Petersburg. He worked as a drawing teacher in some schools of Saint Petersburg, and then became a vice-principal of the Shuvalov – Ozerskov Gymnasium.

In 1920 Grotuss returned to Latvia. He was a member of the Union of Independent Painters, also a member of the board participating in exhibitions of that Union (1921–1934). Then he worked again as a school teacher. During his life he made around 2000 paintings.
