= Aino (given name) =

Female given name

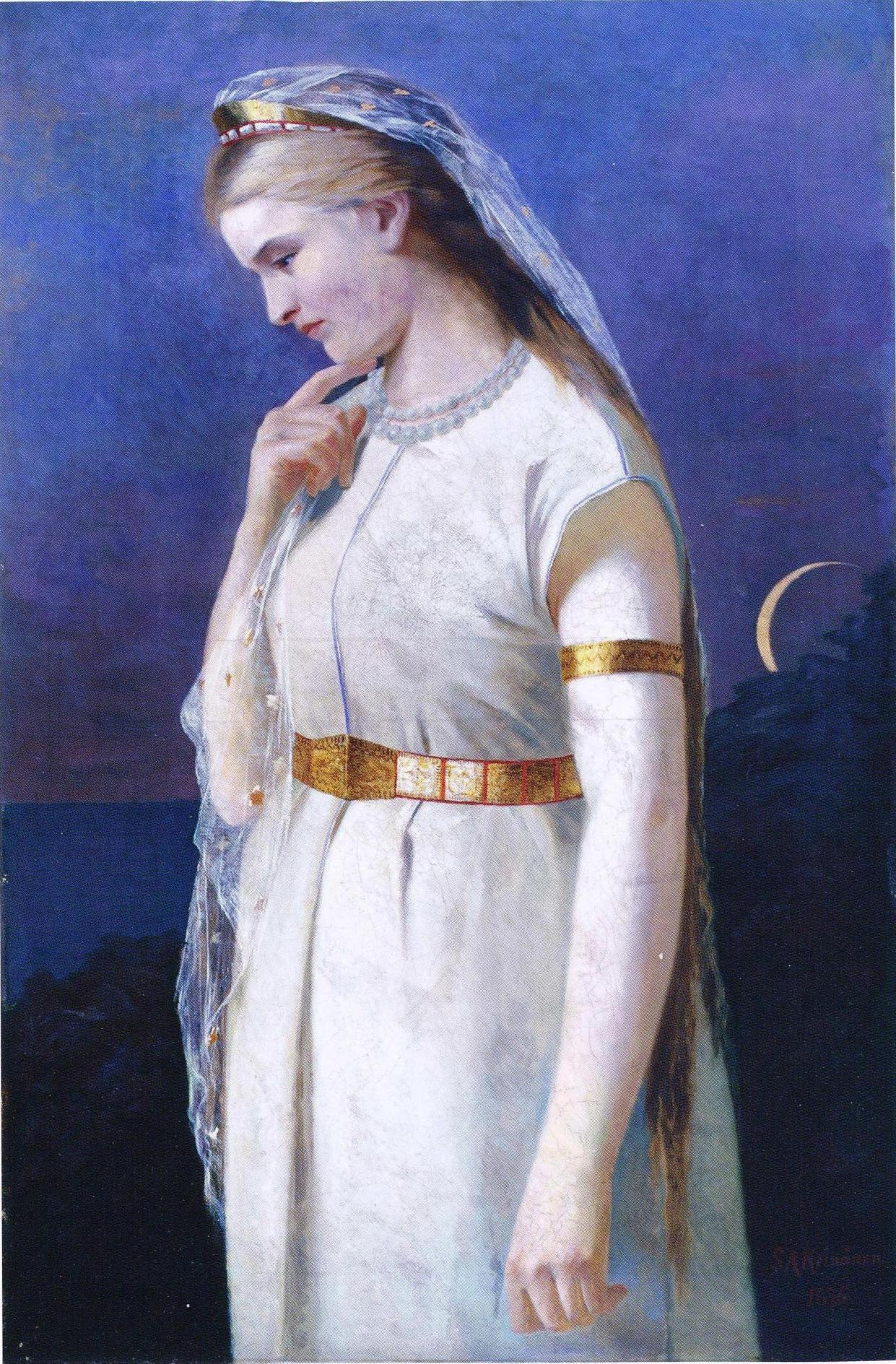
- Aino from the Kalevala by Sigfrid Keinänen, 1876.
- Pronunciation: Eye-no
- Gender: Feminine
- Language: Finnish, Estonian, Japanese

Origin
- Meaning: "only"

Other names
- See also: Aina

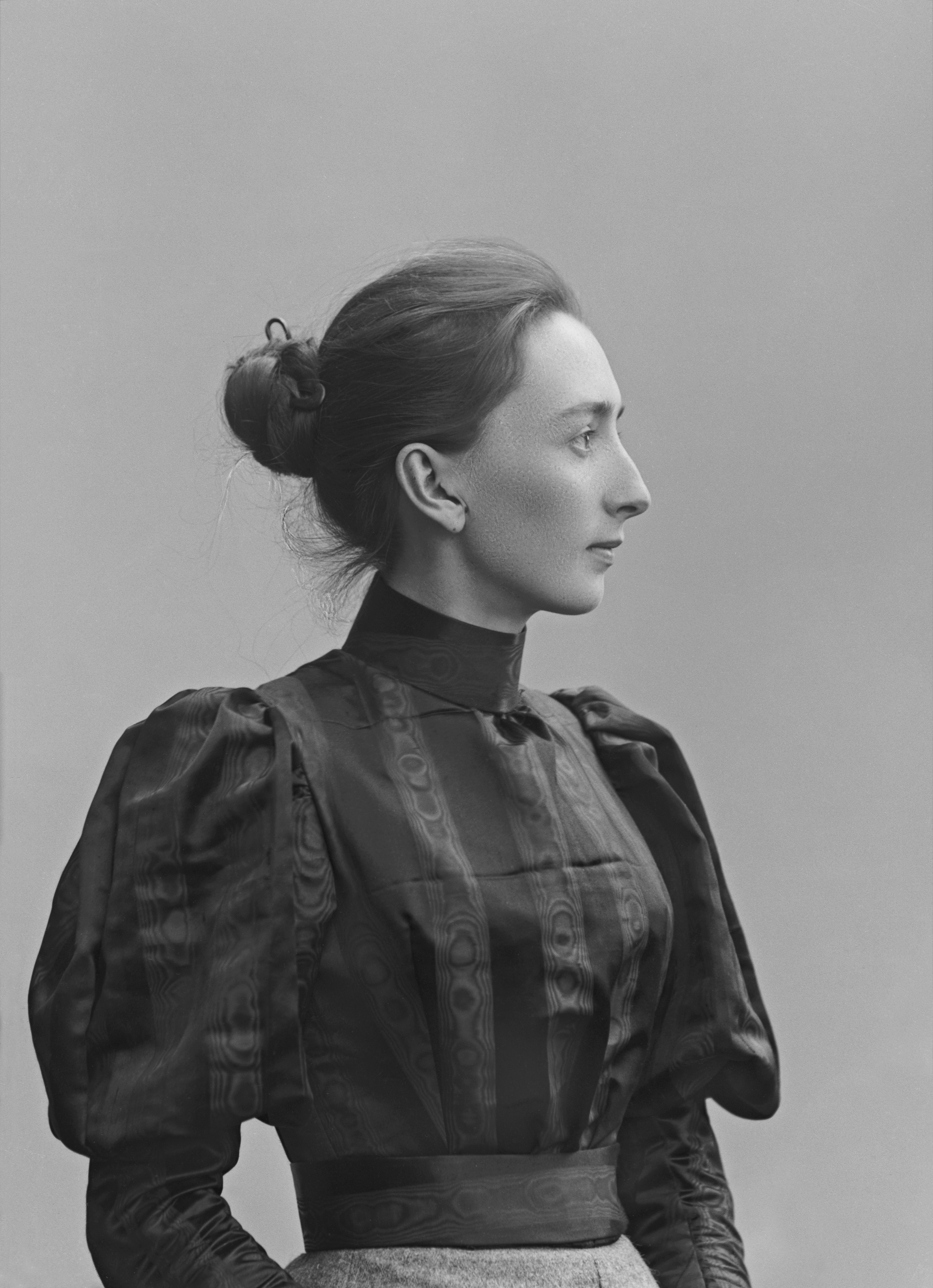
Aino Sibelius (1871–1969).

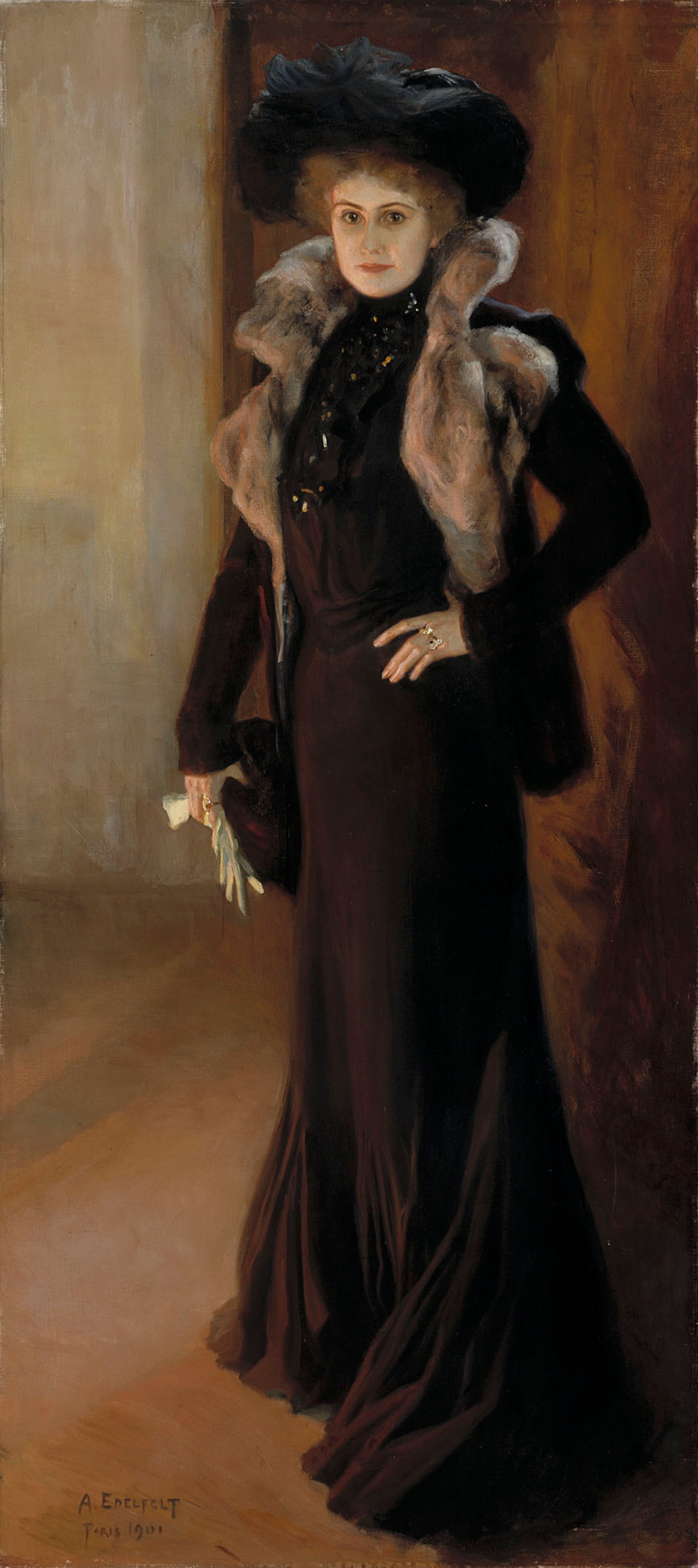
Finnish opera singer Aino Ackté (1876–1944), by Albert Edelfelt.

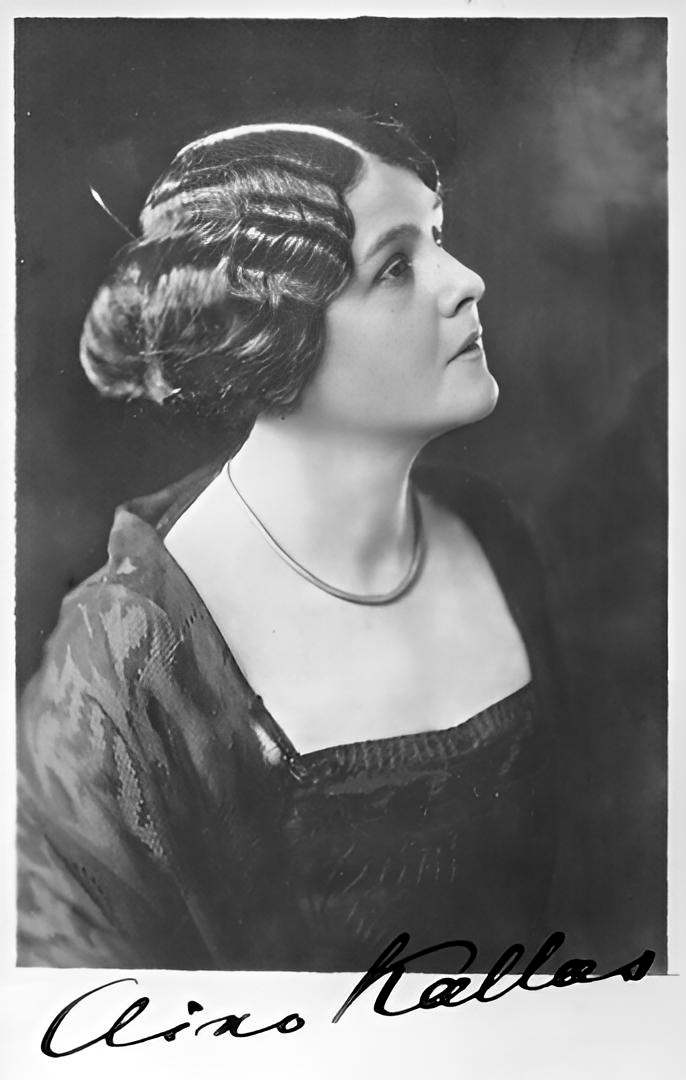
Finnish-Estonian writer Aino Kallas (1878–1956).

Aino is a feminine given name used in Finland, Estonia, and Japan.

The name Aino, meaning "the only one" in Finnish, was devised by Elias Lönnrot, who compiled, from surviving oral folk sources which he had collected, the Kalevala. In this epic poem, Aino is a beautiful girl who seems to wish to drown herself rather than marry the elderly Väinämöinen. Later in the story, she is unexpectedly lost in the water while bathing in a strange, unknown lake. In the original poems, she is mentioned as "the only daughter" (ainoa tyttö).

== National romanticism ==
During the national romantic period in Finland at the end of the 19th century the mythological name Aino was adopted as a Christian name by Fennoman activists. Among the first to be named so were Aino Järnefelt (Aino Sibelius), born 1871, Finnish opera singer Aino Ackté, born 1876, and Finnish-Estonian writer Aino Krohn (the later Aino Kallas), born 1878.

According to the Finnish Population Register Centre, over 60,000 women have been given the name. It was especially popular in the early 20th century, and the most common first name for women in the 1920s. It has returned to favor in the 21st century; it has been a popular name for girls born in Finland in recent years. Aina is a variant.

As of 1 January 2023, Aino is the 73rd most popular female name in Estonia.

== Japanese use ==
Aino is also a feminine name in use in Japan, with different origins and different meanings depending on the combinations of kanji that are used to spell the name.

== Notable people ==
- Aino Aalto (1894–1949), Finnish architect and designer
- Aino Ackté (1876–1944), Finnish opera singer
- Aino Autio (1932–2022), Finnish sprinter
- Aino Bach (1901–1980), Estonian artist
- Aino Bergö (1915–1944), Swedish ballerina, opera singer and film actress
- Aino Forsten (1885–1937), Finnish politician and educator
- Aino Henssen (1925–2011), German-Finnish lichenologist and systematist
- Aino Hivand (born 1947), Norwegian-Sami visual artist and children's book writer
- Aino Jawo (born 1986), member of Swedish pop duo Icona Pop
- Aino Jõgi (1922–2013), Estonian linguist, professor and translator
- Aino Käärik (1918–2021), Estonian-born Swedish biologist
- Aino Kalda (1929–2017), Estonian botanist
- Aino Kallas (1878–1956), Finnish-Estonian writer
- Aino Kallio-Ericsson (1917–2018), Finnish architect
- Aino Kapsta (1935–2024), Estonian metalsmith and jewelry artist
- Aino Karppinen (born 1997), Finnish ice hockey player
- Aino Kinjō, (born 1974), Japanese professional ten-pin bowler
- Aino Kishi (born 1988), Japanese actress and AV idol
- Aino Kukk (1930–2006), Estonian chess player
- Aino Kuusinen (1886–1970), Finnish communist
- Aino Lehtokoski (1886–1949), Finnish politician
- Aino Lepik von Wirén (born 1961), Estonian diplomat
- Aino Lohikoski (1898–1981), Finnish actress
- Aino-Eevi Lukas (1930–2019), Estonian equestrian, lawyer and politician
- Aino-Maija Luukkonen (born 1958), Finnish politician
- Aino Malkamäki (1894–1961), Finnish teacher and politician
- Aino Malmberg (1865–1933), Finnish writer and politician
- Aino Mantsas (1922–1979), Finnish actress
- Aino Nykopp-Koski (born 1950), Finnish serial killer
- Aino Õige (1935–2018), Estonian botanist
- Aino-Kaisa Pekonen (born 1979), Finnish politician
- Aino Pervik (1932–2025), Estonian children's writer and translator
- Aino Riikka Purje (born 1996), Finnish rhythmic gymnast
- Aino Puronen (born 1936), Soviet racing cyclist
- Aino Kann Rasmussen (born 1937), Danish archaeologist
- Aino Runge (1926–2014), Estonian economist, consumer defender and politician
- Aino-Kaisa Saarinen (born 1979), Finnish cross country skier
- Aino Seep (1925–1982), Estonian singer and actress
- Aino Sibelius (1871–1969), wife of composer Jean Sibelius
- Aino Talvi (1909–1992), Estonian actress
- Aino Tamm (1864–1945), Estonian singer and vocal pedagogue
- Aino Taube (1912–1990), Swedish film and theatre actress
- Aino-Maija Tikkanen (1927–2014), Finnish film actress
- Aino Yamada (born 2003), Japanese rhythmic gymnast
- Yuki Aino (born 1994), Japanese professional wrestler and former ring announcer
