= Aina (given name) =

- Pronunciation: /eye/-/na/,/ahyi-na/,
- Gender: Female or male
- Name day: Spain: July 26; Finland: May 10; Sweden: June 13

Origin
- Region of origin: Japan, Latvia, Finland, Scandinavia, Bangladesh, Madagascar

Aina is a given name that is found in multiple cultures. It is typically a female name in Japan, Latvia, Malaysia, Balearic Islands, Catalonia, Valencian Country, Bangladesh, Philippines, Finland, and Scandinavia, also in Madagascar, and a male or female name in Yoruba in Nigeria, Benin and Togo. Aina is a variant of Aino in Finland, and means "the only one." In Japan, the name means "love, affection".

== Given name ==
- Aina Abdul (born 1993), Malaysian singer, songwriter, and actress
- Aina Aiba (相羽 あいな; born 1988), Japanese voice actress and singer
- Aina Apse (1926–2015), New Zealand potter
- Aina Bartmann (born 1959), Norwegian politician
- Aina Basso (born 1979), Norwegian historian and novelist
- Aina Berg (1902–1992), Swedish swimmer
- Aina Calvo (born 1969), Spanish politician
- Aina Cid (born 1994), Spanish competitive rower
- Aina Clotet (born 1982), Spanish actress
- Aina Dumlao (born 1988), Filipino-American Actress
- Aina Elvius (1917–2019), Swedish astronomer
- Aina Erlander (1902–1990), Swedish teacher
- Aina Hashimoto (橋本 愛奈; born 1992), Japanese singer and actress
- Aina Karlsone (1935–2012), Latvian artist
- Aina Hanganeni Kodi, Namibian politician
- Aina Kresken (born 2000), German field hockey player
- Aina Kuric (born 1987), French politician
- Aina Kusuda (楠田 亜衣奈; born 1989), Japanese actress and singer
- Aina Moll Marquès (1930–2019), Spanish philologist and politician
- Aina More (born 1992), British actor and singer
- Aina Muceniece (1924–2010), Latvian scientist
- Aina Najwa (born 1996), Malaysian cricketer
- Aina Onabolu (1882–1963), Nigerian artist
- Aina Owoniyi (born 1955), Nigerian politician
- Aina Rado (1947–2017), Spanish politician
- Aina Stenersen (born 1983), Norwegian politician
- Aina Suzuki (鈴木 愛奈; born 1995), Japanese voice actress
- Aina Takeuchi (竹内 愛奈; born 1991), Japanese ice hockey player
- Aina Tymchuk (born 1973), Ukrainian politician
- Aina Vidal (born 1985), Spanish politician
- Aina Vilberh (born 1985), Ukrainian singer
- Aina Wifalk (1928–1983), Swedish social scientist and inventor

== Stage name ==
- Aina, stage name of Kseniya Kruchinina, soloist of the Russian band Aina

== See also ==
- Aina (disambiguation)
