= Luukkonen =

Luukkonen is a Finnish surname. Notable people with the surname include:

- Aino-Maija Luukkonen (born 1958), Finnish politician
- Gabriel Luukkonen (1880–1943), Finnish politician
- Fanni Luukkonen (1882–1947), leader of the Finnish Lotta Svärd
- Mauno Luukkonen (born 1934), Finnish biathlete
- Risto-Veikko Luukkonen (1902–1972), Finnish architect
- Risto Luukkonen (1931–1967), Finnish boxer
- Ukko-Pekka Luukkonen (born 1999), Finnish professional ice hockey goaltender
- Venla Luukkonen (born 1984), Finnish athlete
