= Assistep =

Accessibility device

- Product type: Mobility aid
- Country: Norway
- Website: https://assistep.com/

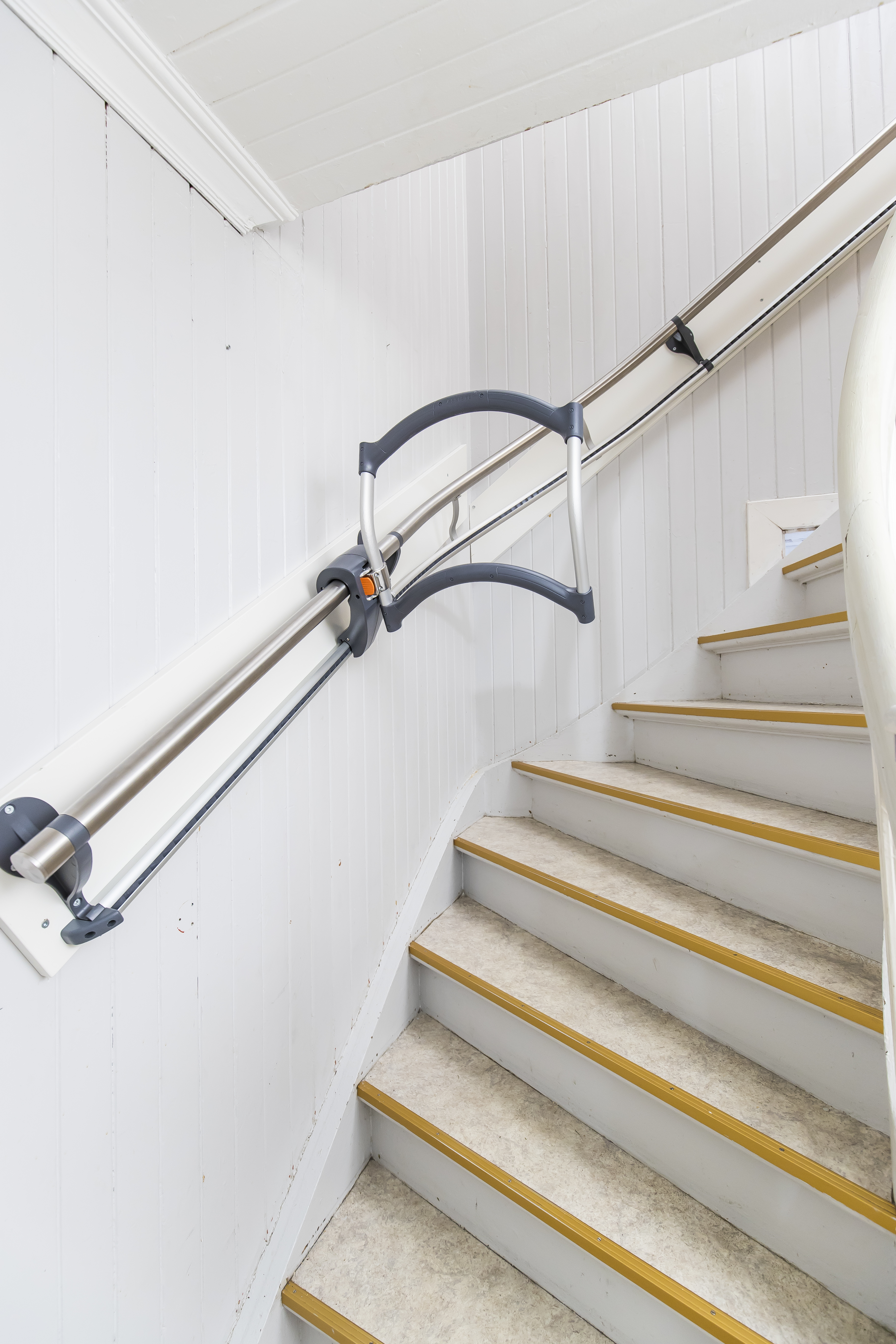
Assistep handrail and handle

AssiStep (Assitech AS) is an accessibility device that can by used by people with reduced mobility to climb and descend the stairs. It consists of a railing system fixed to the wall, on which a handle is attached. The product was developed in Trondheim (Norway) and is now sold in 16 countries.

== Use ==
The handle provides support through a locking mechanism. The user holds onto the handle, similarly to a rollator. To go up and down the stairs, the user raises the handle an armlength forward and it locks itself when downward pressure is exerted.

The product can be used by people measuring between 120 cm and 200 cm length and supports a maximal user weight of 120 kg. The railing system consists of a standard 4,2 cm diameter stainless steel railing that extends 9,6 cm out from the wall. The handle extends a total of 45,6 cm out from the wall when in use and 18,4 cm when folded to the side.

== Development ==
The AssiStep was developed by former engineering students from NTNU, in cooperation with the School of Occupational therapy in Trondheim, where the goals were to develop a tool not requiring electricity and to prevent stairway falls. They started in 2012 while they were still enrolled at the university. The product development took 3 years, before AssiStep was launched in 2015. In the beginning of 2020, it was available in a total of 16 countries. The development and production phases were financed through a crowdfunding campaign where 2 million kroner were invested in the project.

The AssiStep has been awarded or nominated several times:

- The award for "Best solution" by the Silver Eco Ageing Well Award 2019
- Nominated to the prize for the best Nordic innovation
- The award for best Nordic collaboration project in 2016 by the Nordic Council
- Second place in the Venture Cup edition of 2013, a Scandinavian business plan competition

== Certifications ==
AssiStep has been tested and certified by the German company TÜV, an organization providing inspection and product certification services. It complies with the technical safety standards EN ISO 12182: 2012 (mobility aid for the elderly) and EN ISO 14971: 2012 (medical devices).
