= Aino (character) =

Fictional character in the Finnish epic Kalevala

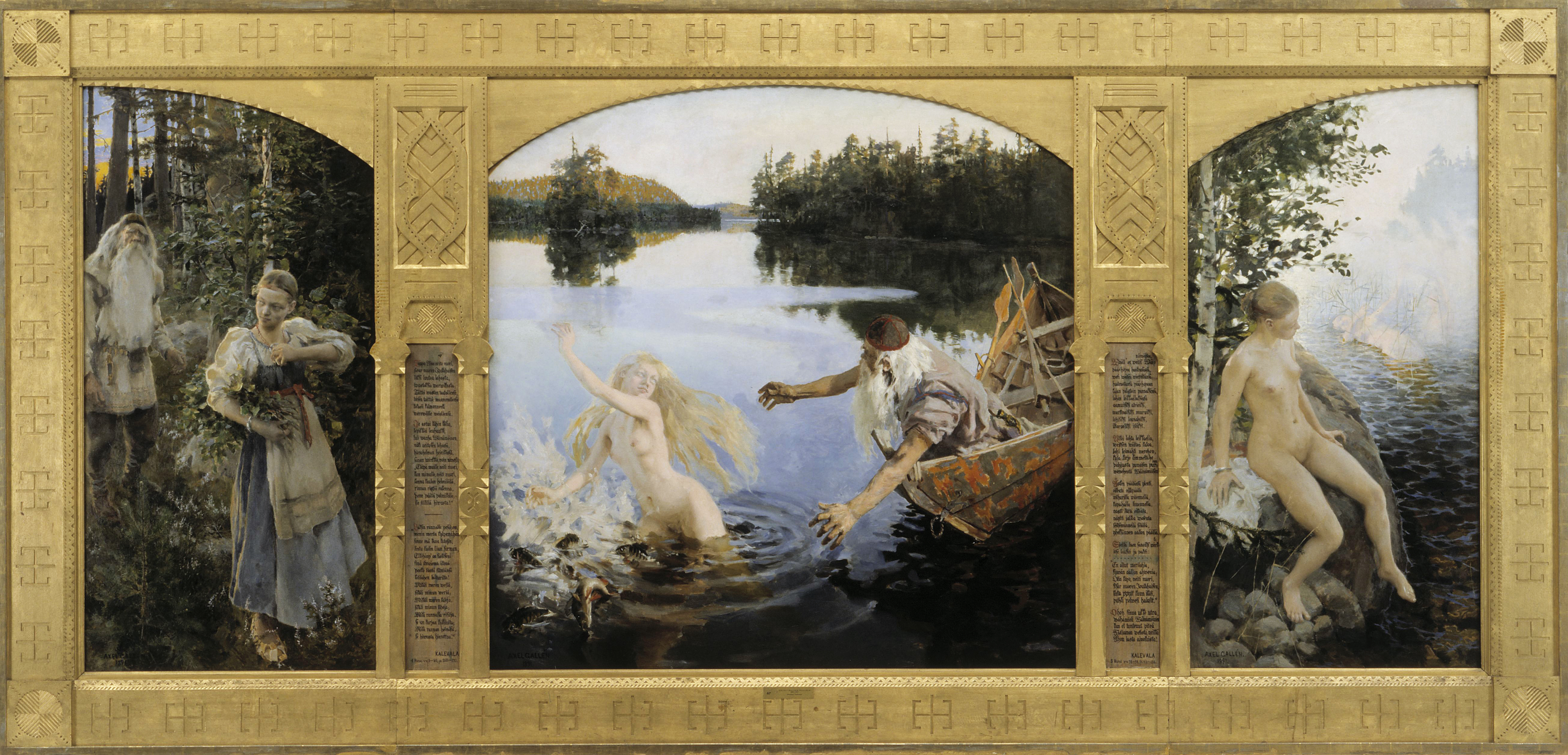
Aino Myth, Triptych painted by Akseli Gallen-Kallela in 1891, with his own wife Mary as the model. It depicts the story on three panels: The left panel shows the first encounter between Väinämöinen and Aino in the forest. The right one depicts a mournful Aino weeping on the shore and listening to the call of the maids of Vellamo who are playing in the water. The central panel depicts Väinämöinen fishing, who has thrown away a small fish that turns out to be Aino, who laughs at him and vanishes forever.

Aino (Finnish pronunciation: [ˈɑi̯no]) is a figure in the Kalevala, a Finnish national epic by Elias Lönnrot. Lönnrot invented the name Aino, meaning "the only one"; the original poems only call her "the only daughter" or "the only sister" (aino tyttönen, aino sisko).

Her brother Joukahainen loses a singing contest to Väinämöinen and promises Aino's "hands and feet" in marriage to the winner. Aino's mother is pleased to marry her daughter to someone so famous and well-born, but Aino does not want to marry such an old man and drowns herself (or is transformed into a nixie). She returns to taunt the grieving Väinämöinen as a perch.

During the national romantic period at the end of the 19th century the mythological name Aino was adopted as a Christian name by Fennoman activists. Among the first to be named so were Aino Järnefelt (Aino Sibelius), born 1871 and Aino Krohn (the later Aino Kallas), born 1878.

According to the Finnish Population Register Centre, over 60,000 women have been given the name. It was especially popular in the early 20th century and the most common first name for women in the 1920s. It has returned to favor in the 21st century; it was the most popular name for girls in Finland in 2006 and 2007.

== Gallery ==
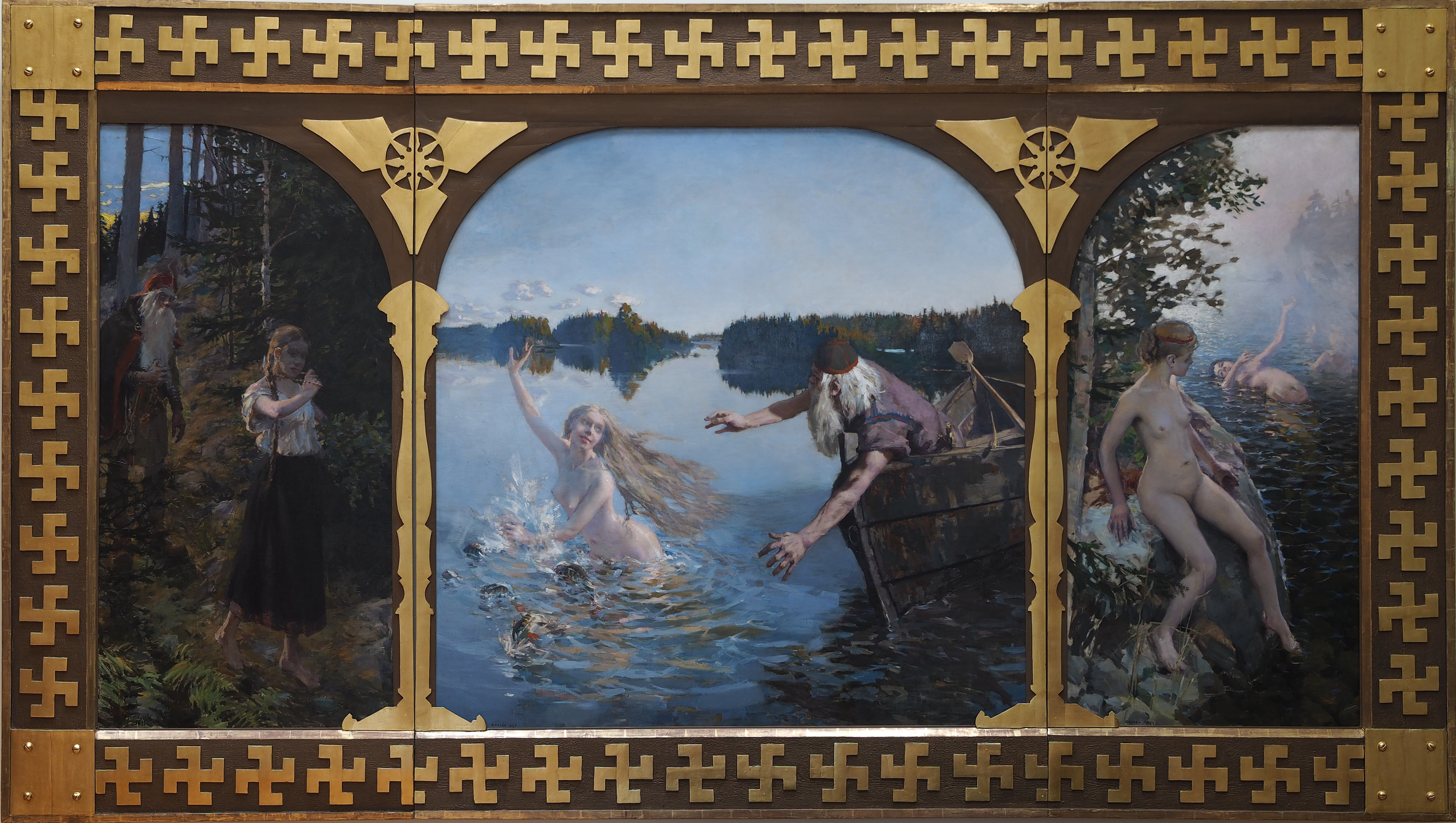
The earlier 1889 version of the triptych by Gallen-Kallela where Aino had the likeness of a French model

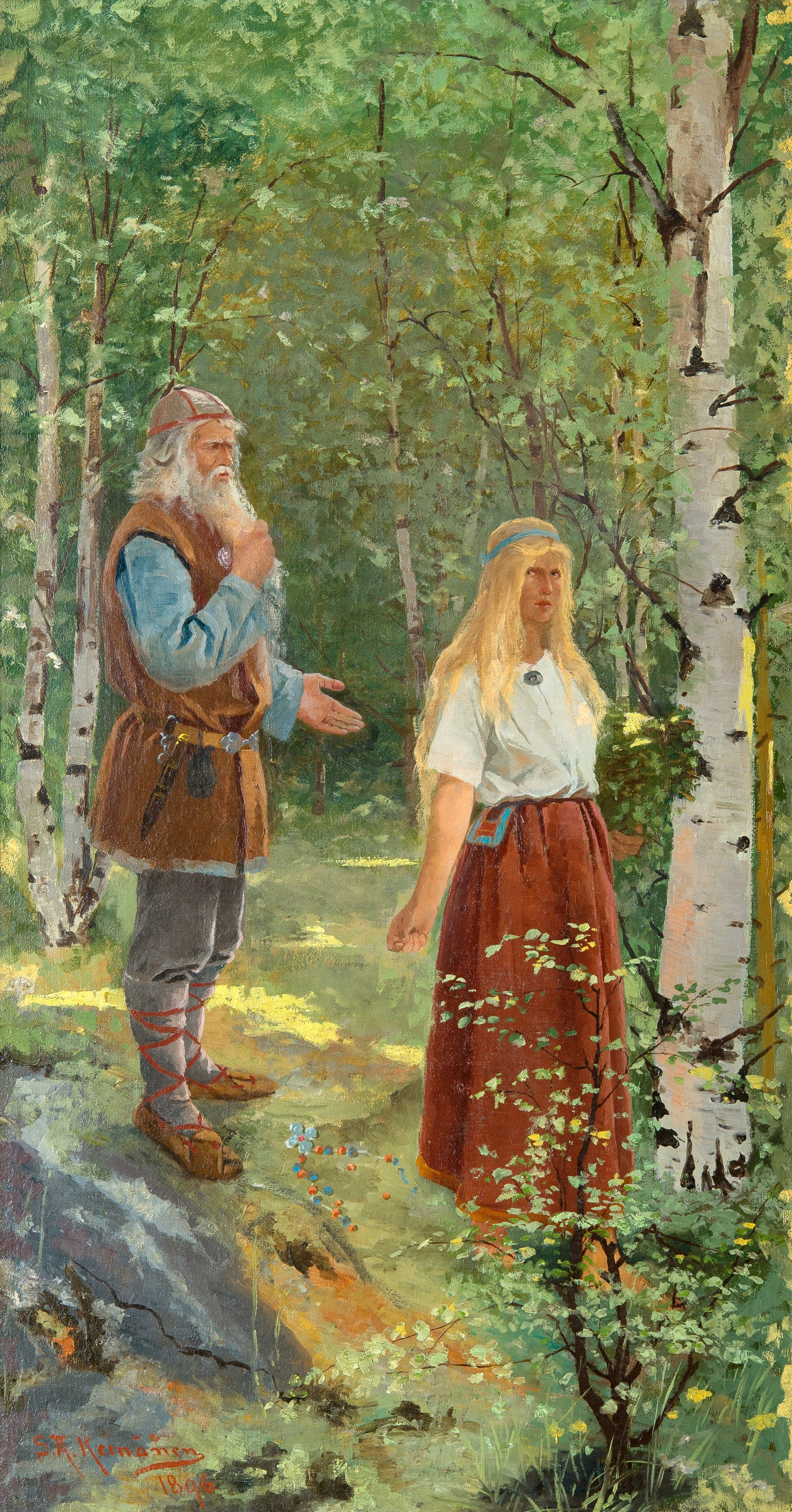
Väinämöinen and Aino, Sigfrid Keinänen, 1896

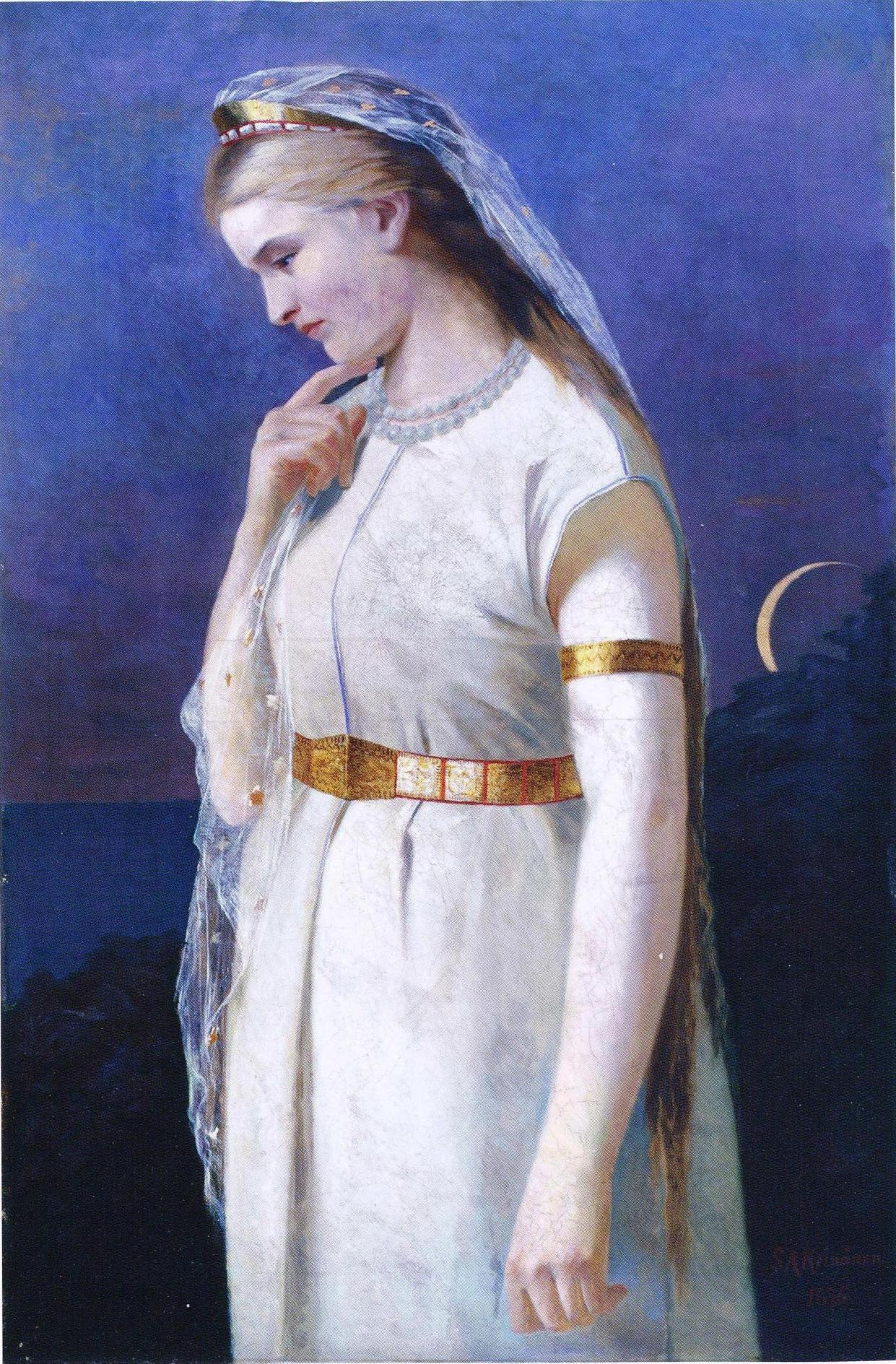
Aino by the Sea, Sigfrid Keinänen, 1876

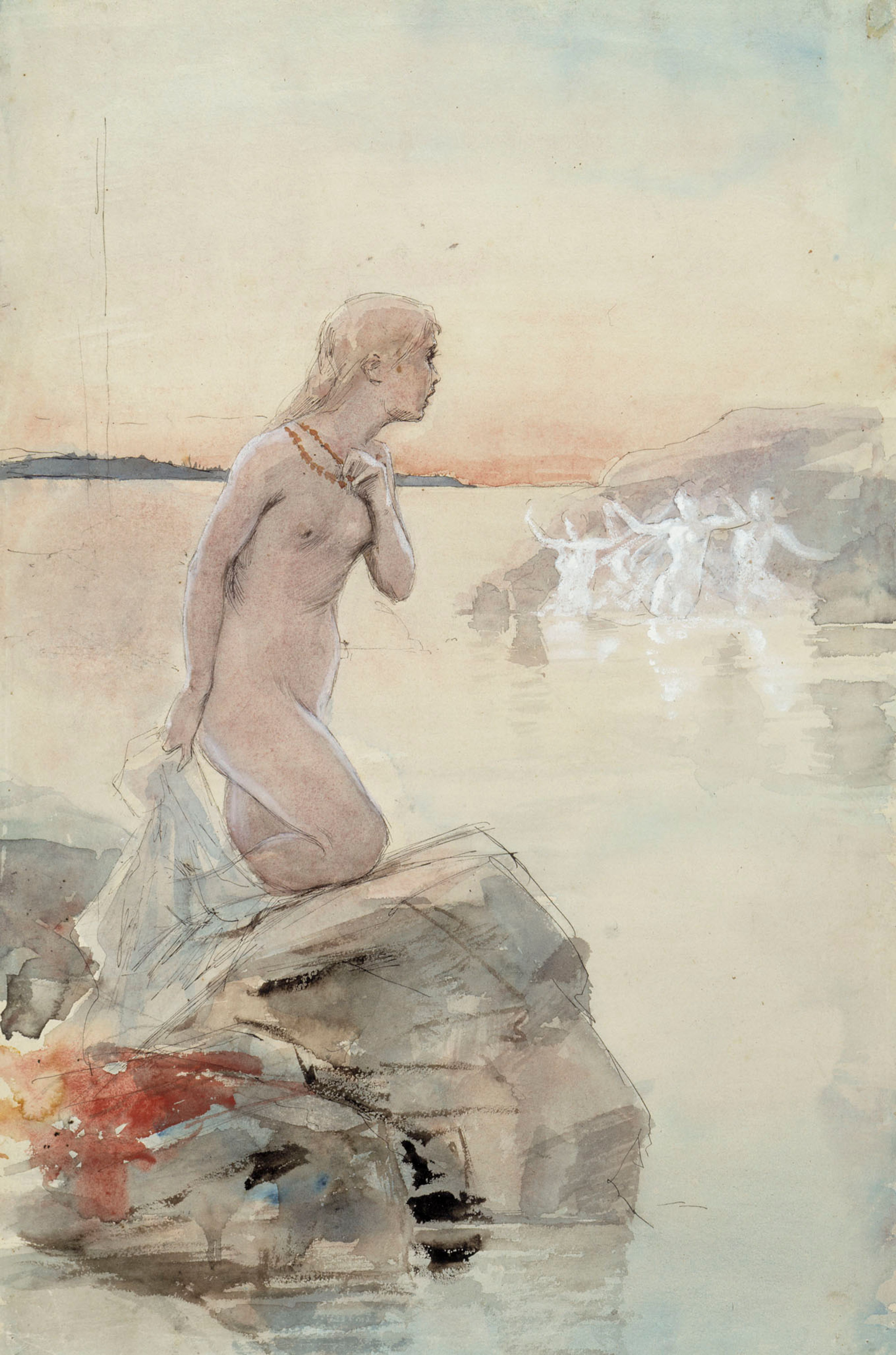
Aino, watercolor by Albert Edelfelt

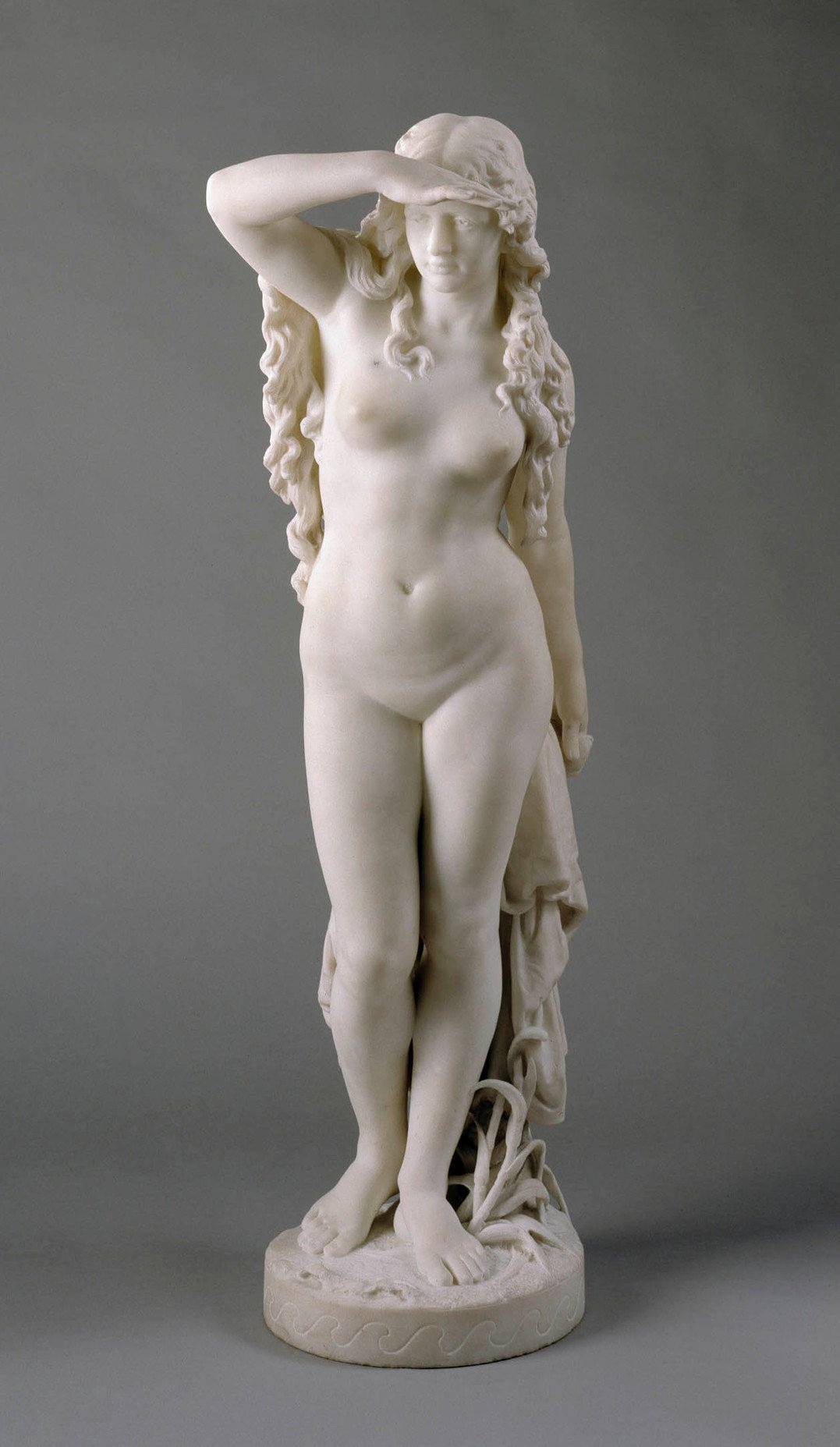
Aino, Looking Out to Sea, Johannes Takanen, 1876

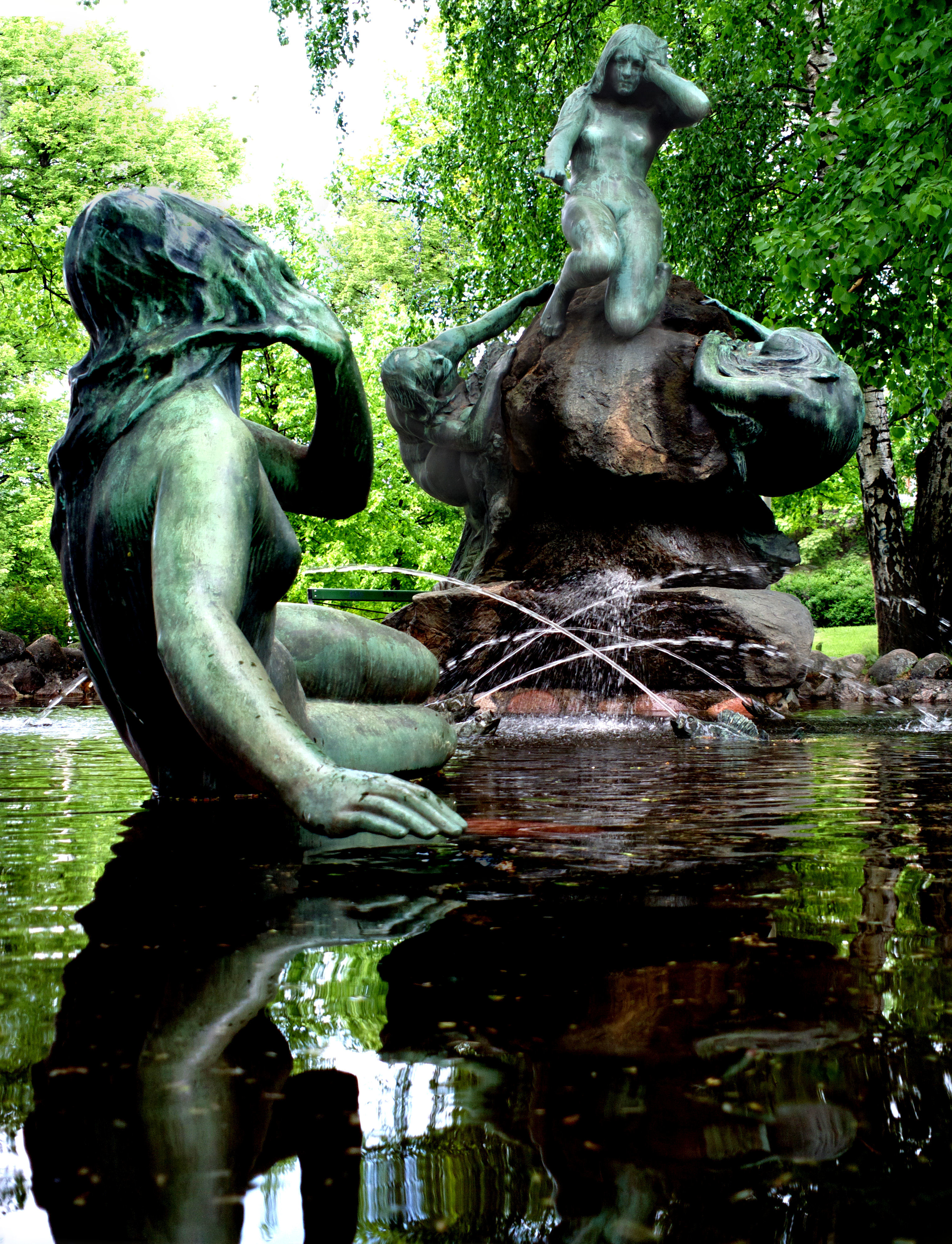
Aino Fountain in Lahti by Emil Wikström, 1912 (fi)

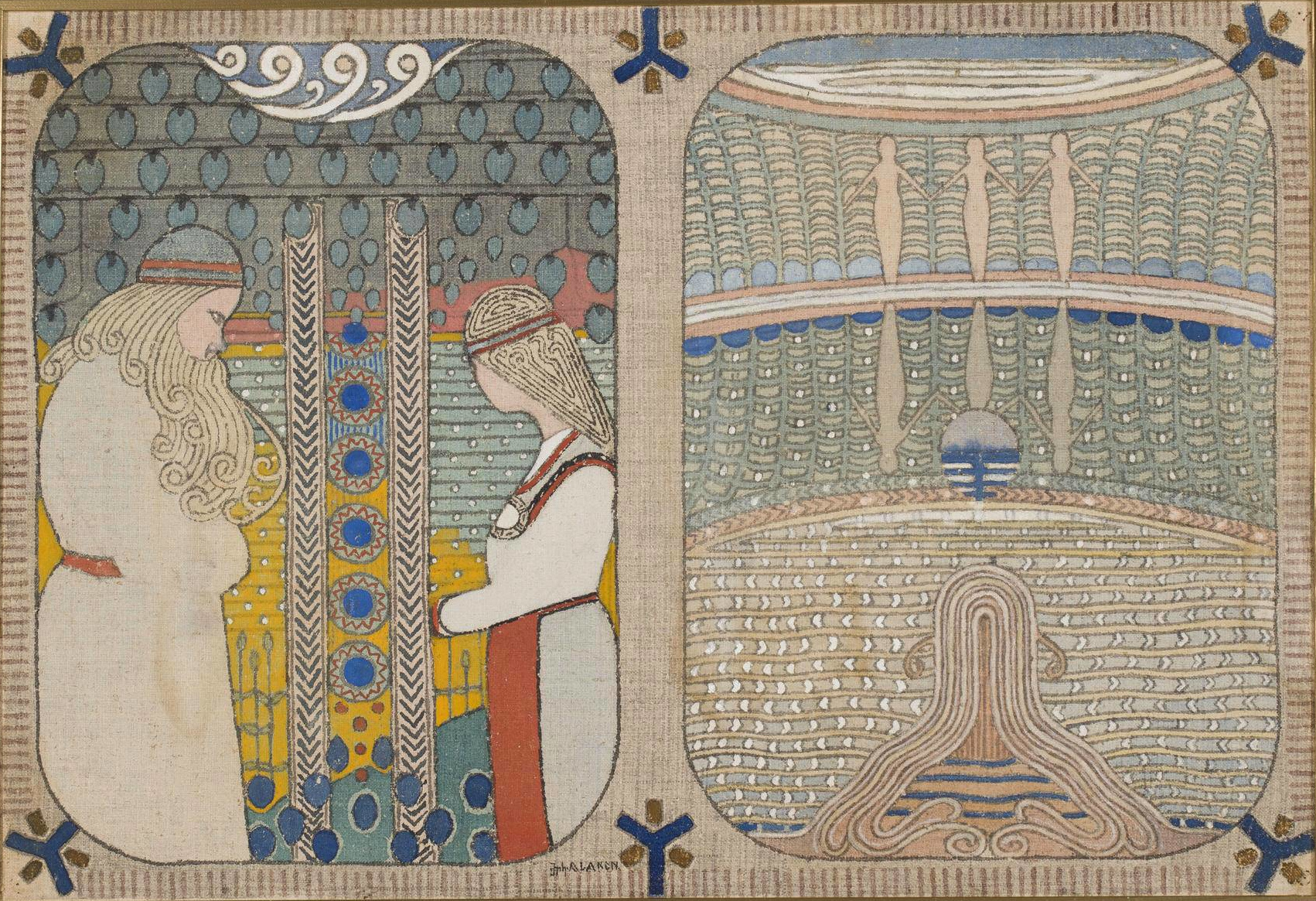
Courting of Aino and Aino Drowns Herself, Joseph Alanen, 1908–1910

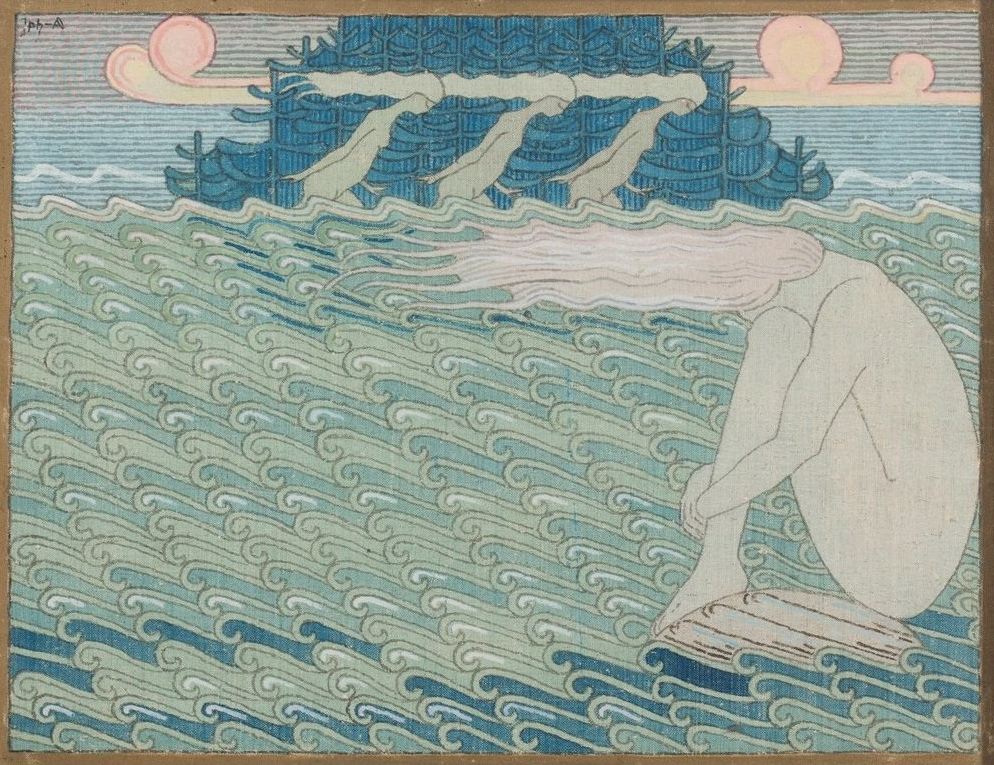
Maidens at the Headlands, Joseph Alanen, 1919–1920
