= Lycée franco-finlandais d'Helsinki =

Bilingual school in Munkkivuori, Helsinki, Finland

Coordinates: 60.2077°N 24.8701°E

Lycée franco-finlandais d'Helsinki Helsingin ranskalais-suomalainen koulu
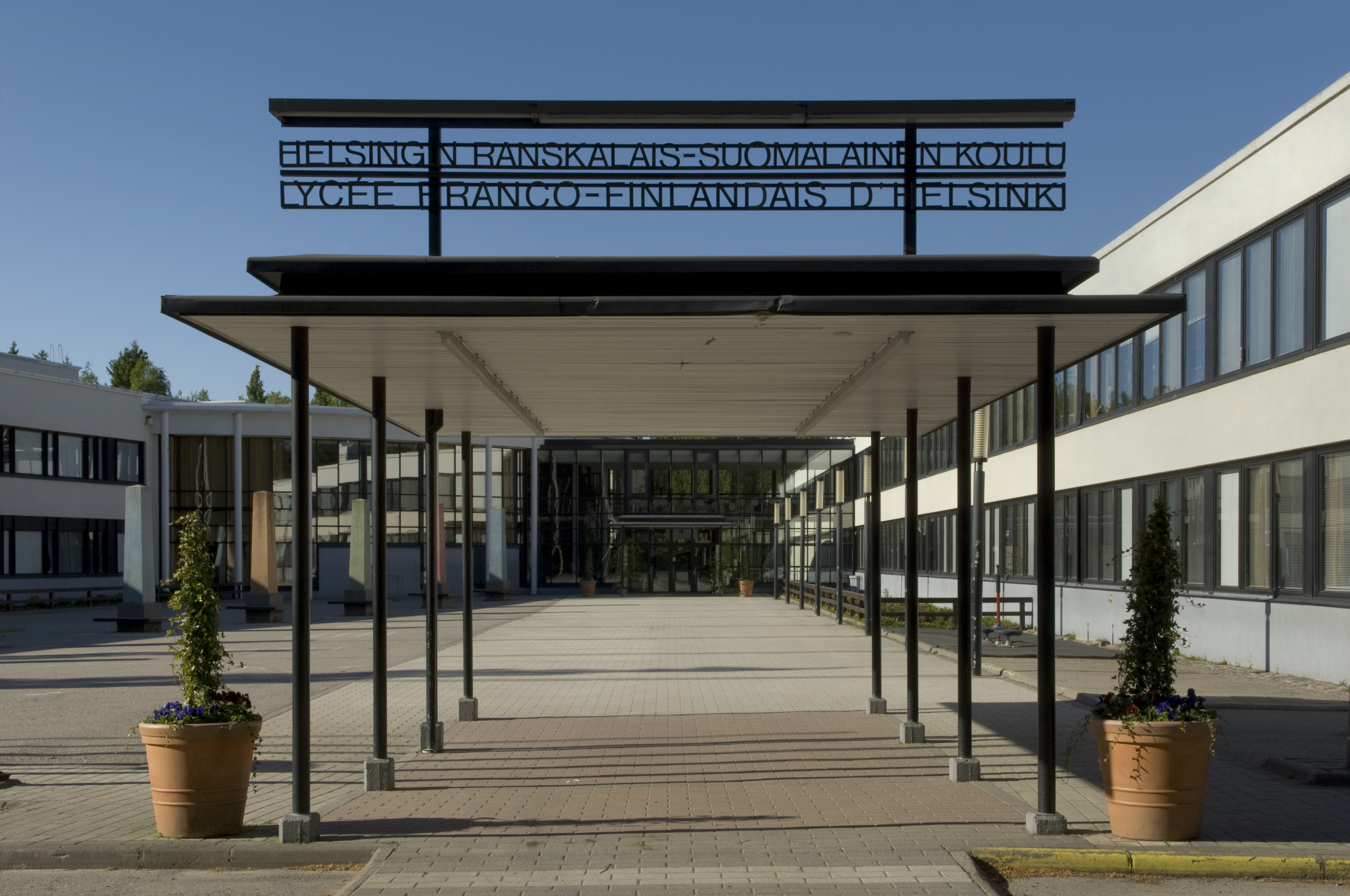

Address
- Raumantie 4 Munkkivuori, Helsinki

Information
- Established: 1938; 87 years ago
- Language: French, Finnish
- Website: Official Site

Lycée franco-finlandais d'Helsinki (Finnish: Helsingin ranskalais-suomalainen koulu HRSK) is a Franco-Finnish school in Munkkivuori, Helsinki, Finland. The school includes a preschool, a comprehensive school, a high school and a private playschool operated by the Friends of the French School Association, which operates in the same building.

In 2023, there were approximately 600 students in the comprehensive school and approximately 170 students in the upper secondary school.

== History ==
It was founded by Frenchwoman Catherine Servé in 1938. Originally just a kindergarten, it expanded into a primary school in 1947.

The school's architecture was worked on by Finnish architect Aino Kallio-Ericsson in 1956.

It has been run by the Finnish state since 1977, using the Finnish school system, with the Republic of France paying wages of 7-10 teachers. Students graduating there receive the Finnish matriculation examination and French government give to students the diplomas of equal value of French baccalauréat.
