= Age-related mobility disability =

Aspect of senescence

Age-related mobility disability is a self-reported inability to walk due to impairments, limited mobility, dexterity or stamina. It has been found mostly in older adults with decreased strength in lower extremities.

== History ==
According to the National Research Council, the population of older adults is expected to increase in the United States by 2030 due to the aging population of the baby boomer generation; this in turn will increase the population of mobility disabled individuals in the community. This raises the importance of being able to predict disability due to inability to walk at an early stage, which will eventually decrease health care costs. Aging cause a decrease in physical strength and in lower extremities, which ultimately leads to decrease in functional mobility, in turn leading to disability which is shown to be common in women due to differences in distribution of resources and opportunities. The early detection of mobility disabilities will help clinicians and patients in determining the early management of the conditions which could be associated with the future disability. Mobility disabilities are not restricted to older and hospitalized individuals; such disabilities have been reported in young and non-hospitalized individuals as well due to decreased functional mobility. The increase in the rate of disability causes loss of functional independence and increases the risk of future chronic diseases.

== Definition ==
Mobility is defined as the ability to move around, and mobility disability occurs when a person has problems with activities such as walking, standing up, or balancing. The use of a mobility aid device such as a mobility scooter, wheelchair, crutches or a walker can help with community ambulation. Another term that is coined to define mobility disabilities based on performance is "performance based mobility disability". It is the inability to increase your walking speed more than 0.4 m/s. An individual who is unable to walk at >0.4 m/s is considered severely disabled and would require a mobility device to walk in community.

== Risk factors ==
There are a number of factors that could be associated with mobility disability, but according to the Centers for Disease Control and Prevention, "stroke is found to be the leading cause of mobility disability, in turn reducing functional mobility in more than half of the stroke survivors above 65 years of age".

== Measures ==
There are several measurement scales designed to detect mobility disabilities. The measures that can detect mobility disabilities are classified into two categories, self-reported measures and performance measures. There is a need to differentiate between these measures based on their ability to detect mobility disabilities, such as differences in their reliability and validity. Self-reported measures are commonly used to detect mobility disabilities, but recently developed performance measures have been shown to be effective in predicting future mobility disabilities in older adults.

=== Self-reported measures ===
Several qualitative research studies use survey, questionnaires and self-reported scales to detect a decrease in functional mobility or to predict future mobility disability in older adults. The advantages of these qualitative research scales are easier data acquisition and can be performed on the larger population. Although there is difference in perception of condition between subjects (gender difference), type of chronic conditions and age-related changes such as memory and reasoning, all of which can affect the information and scores of the individual, still self-reported measures have been used extensively in behavioral and correlation studies. The commonly used self-reported measures to detect mobility disability are Stroke Impact scale, Rosow-Breslau scale, Barthel index, and Tinetti Falls Efficacy Scale. Based on reliability and validity of these scales, Stroke Impact scale has proven to have excellent test-retest reliability and construct validity, however, if it can predict future mobility disability in older adults is yet to be found. In contrast, Rosow-Breslau scale, Barthel Index and Tinetti Falls Efficacy Scale proved important to predict future mobility disability based on the activities involved in these questionnaire scales.

=== Performance-based measures ===
Mobility disabilities due to age-related musculoskeletal pain or increase in chronic conditions are easier to detect by performance measures. Some commonly used performance measures to detect mobility disabilities are the 400-meter walking test, 5-minute walk test , walking speed, short physical performance battery test. Among these measures, 400-meter walk test and short physical performance battery test has been proven to be strong predictors of mobility disability in older adults. In addition to prediction, there is moderate to excellent correlation between these two tests. Based on reliability and validity of measurement scales to predict mobility disability, self-reported measures such as Barthel index, and performance measures such as 400 m walk test and short physical performance battery test are strongly associated with prediction of mobility disability in older adults.
