= Aino Kallio-Ericsson =

Finnish architect (1917–2018)

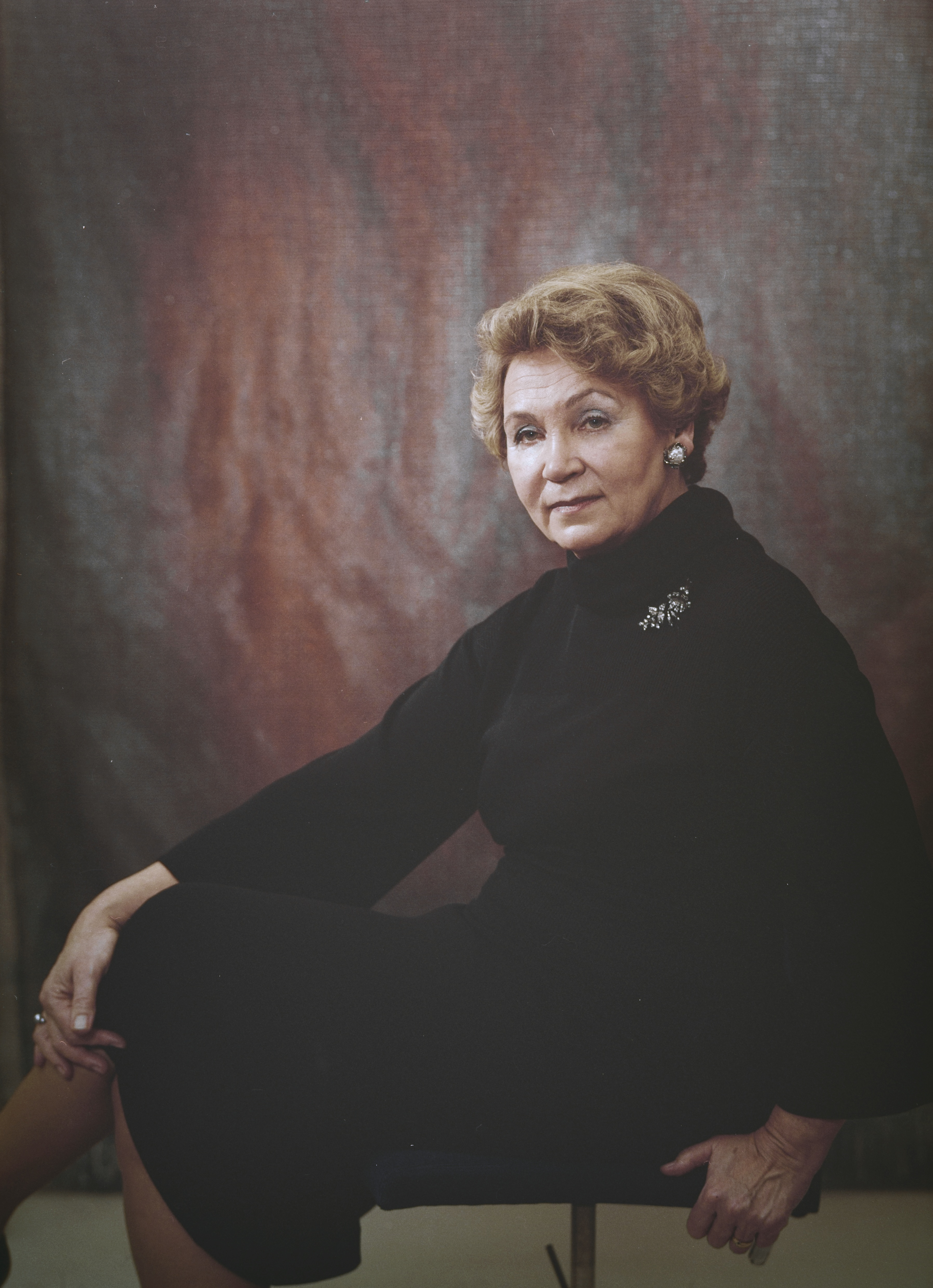

Aino Kallio-Ericsson (25 May 1917 in Mikkeli – 28 May 2018 in Helsinki) was a Finnish architect, most notable for her work on the Lycée franco-finlandais d'Helsinki in 1956.
