= Aina Wifalk =

Swedish social scientist and inventor (1928–1983)

Aina Wifalk (21 March 1928 – 16 June 1983) was a Swedish social scientist and inventor of the modern walker.

== Life and work ==
Wifalk was born in Lund, Sweden on 21 March 1928. In 1949, during her apprenticeship as a nurse, she fell ill with polio. The illness forced the 21-year old Wifalk to end her apprenticeship. From then on she campaigned for people with disabilities. In 1952 she founded a club for physically disabled people in her hometown Lund, in 1958 an association for patients with multiple sclerosis in the Västmanland region and in 1968 the National Association for Accident Victims in Västerås.

After her aborted education, she studied social sciences. From 1957 on, she worked as a consultant in the orthopedic clinic in Västerås. At the end of the 1960s, she also advised the city of Västerås on the interests of disabled people.

Aina Wifalk died on 16 June 1983 at the age of 55 in Västerås.

== Inventions ==
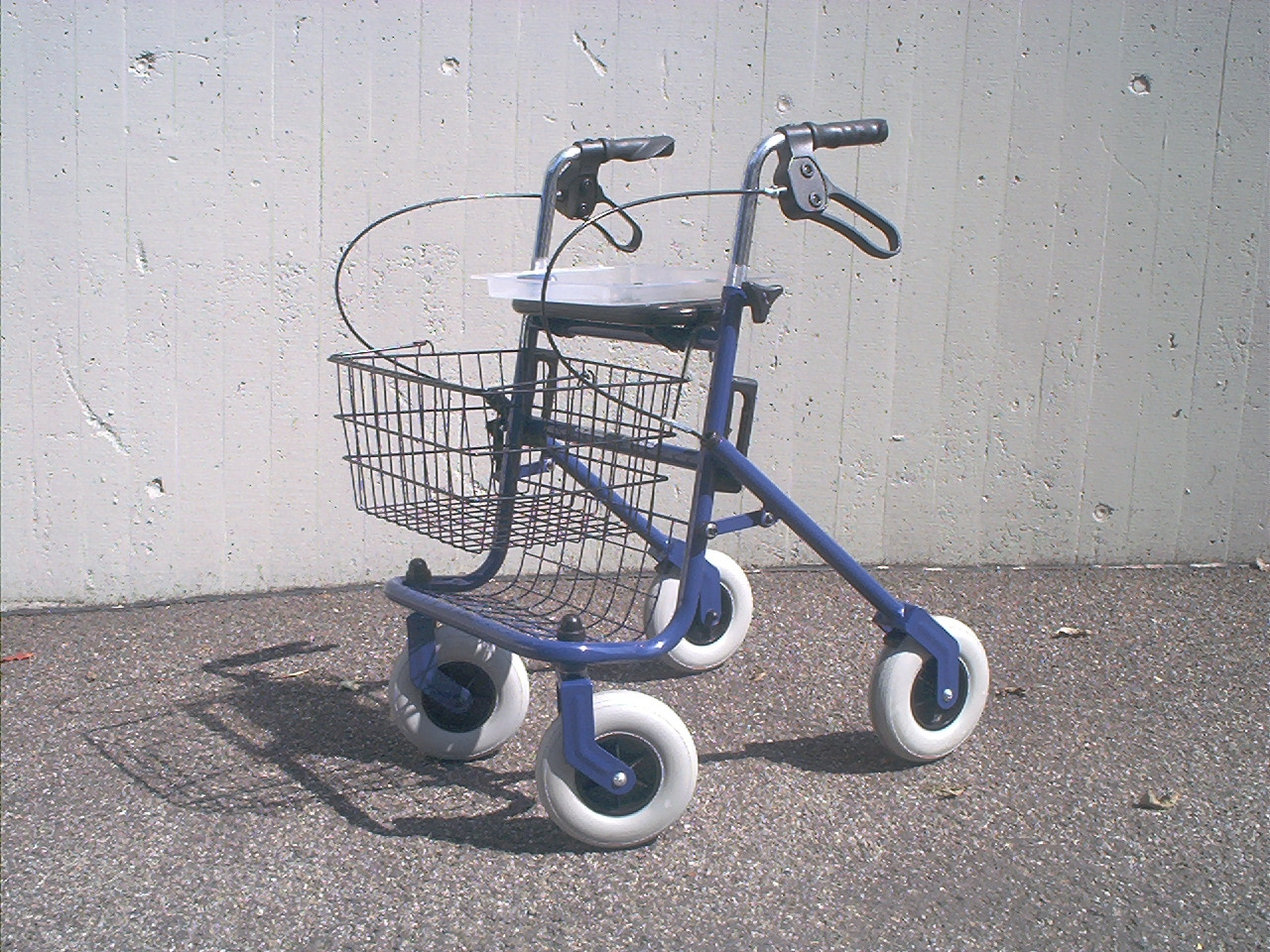
The modern walker, Wifalks most noted invention

Wifalk developed two aids for people with physical impairments: the manuped and the walker. She did not patent her inventions because she wanted to make them available to as many disabled people as possible. She received only royalties from the sale of her developments, which she bequeathed in the name of the Nordic Church Association on the Spanish Costa del Sol, which she had visited several times in her life.

=== Manuped ===
Wifalk presented her first invention to the public in 1965. The "manuped" is a training device for people with physical impairments. With a manuped, affected people can train their arms and legs as well as their coordination with each other. On the basis of the manuped, various training devices for physically disabled people were developed in the following decades, which continue to be used today in health services as well as in special sport schools.

=== Walker ===
In the 1970s, Wifalk's ability to walk became progressively more restricted by her poliomyelitis. Since the four-legged walkers available at that time did not meet the requirements for a comfortable walking aid, she began working on an improved design. She made the original frame more stable, added larger wheels and brakes, and a storage or seating surface. She also optimized the device for use both inside and outside of buildings. In 1978, Wifalk presented the first draft of a walking frame. With the help of a state development fund, she found a Swedish company to produce a prototype, and shortly after, mass production of the walking frame began.

The walker became established worldwide in the following decades. In Germany alone, by the middle of 2016, it is estimated that as many as three million people use walking frames on a regular basis.
