= Aino Lehtokoski =

Finnish member of Parliament

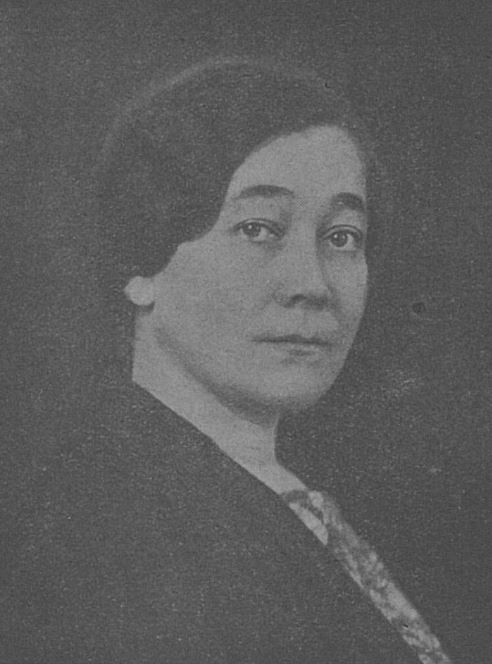
- Portrait of Aino Lehtokoski in the 1930s
- Born: Aino Aleksandra Malm; 6 June 1886; Maaria, Finland
- Died: 14 October 1949 (aged 63); Helsinki, Finland
- Occupation: Parliamentarian
- Years active: 1919 to 1949
- Spouse: Aksel Valdemar Lehtokoski
- Parents: Frans Fredrik Malm (father); Eeva Stiina Tienhaara (mother)

Aino Aleksandra Lehtokoski (6 June 1886, Maaria – 14 October 1949, Helsinki) was a Finnish economic adviser and a Social Democrat Member of Parliament for 30 years.

== Life ==
She joined the Social Democratic Party in 1904 as well as the socialist democrat in the sobriety movement. She also lectured at the Confederation of Consumer Cooperatives from 1925 to 1933.

=== Parliamentarian ===
Lehtokoski, who served in Finland's parliament from 1919 to her death in 1949, was Finland's fourth longest-serving female MP behind Sirkka-Liisa Anttila, After Miina Sillanpää and Aino Malkamäki. Lehtokoski received the title of economic adviser in 1949.

As a member of the Socialist Democratic Party, she represented the southern constituency of Turku County. She was the Presidential Elector in the presidential elections of 1925, 1931, 1937, 1940 and 1943. She was also a member of the Ulvila Municipal Council. Lehtokoski was a member of the federal committees of the Social Democratic Workers' Women's Union and the Sobriety Union. She was also on the advisory committees on maintenance and sobriety and alcohol.

She also held other civic positions.

- Federal Committee of the Social Democratic Workers' Union
- Board of the Prohibition Act
- Federal Commission for Socialist Sobriety
- Joint Committee of Sobriety Organizations
- The host of the Helsinki Workers' Savings Bank
- Board of Governors of the Workers' Academy

=== Personal life ===
Lehtokoski's parents were carpenter Frans Fredrik Malm and Eeva Stiina Tienhaara and she was born in 1886 in Maaria, which is now part of the city of Turku, Finland. She had only an elementary school education and in 1897 she found work as a servant.

In 1910, she married Aksel Valdemar Lehtokoski.

Aino Lehtokoski died in the autumn of 1949 in Helsinki during her term in Parliament and was succeeded there by Yrjö Helenius.
