= Aino Kapsta =

Estonian jewelry artist (1935–2024)

Aino Teelem Kapsta (15 July 1935 – 24 March 2024) was an Estonian metalsmith, jewelry artist and matriarch of the Kapsta family of jewelers. Over a sixty-year career in jewelry design, Kapsta became known for her expert filigree and metalwork, largely in silver and copper. She has exhibited her work in galleries across the globe, including London, Japan and Moscow.

== Biography ==
Aino Teelem was born in Tagavere on Saaremaa in 1935. Her mother managed the family and her father was a blacksmith and quarryman. The association with both the quarry and her father's work as a blacksmith inspired her interest in metalworking.

Kapsta entered the Estonian Academy of the Arts in 1954 with the intention of becoming a sculptor. In 1961, Kapsta graduated from the Academy of Arts after turning her attention to metalwork. In 1966, she became a member of the Estonian Artist's Association, where through the association she created a number of large scale metalworks, including fountains, decorative grids and panels installed across Estonia and the former Soviet Union. Due to Soviet restrictions on the use of precious metal at the time, Kapsta began designing intricate works first in copper and copper alloy, inspired by folk art and archeological finds. Later she would work in silver.

For the last thirty years of her career, she dedicated her work to filigree and jewelry work. In 1995 a large respective of her work was held at the Estonian National Library and also at Kuressaare Castle.

In 2020, she was awarded the Ede Kurrel Prize, the Annual Prize of the Estonian Metal Artists' Association in recognition for her longevity and body of work. That year, she held a retrospective of her work at A-Gallery, a gallery she co-founded in honor of her 85th birthday.

Kapsta died 24 March 2024. At the time of her death, she was preparing for her first exhibition.

== Legacy ==
Kapsta's daughter, Keesi Kapsta later became a jewelry designer and metal artist after the urging of her mother. The third generation of the Kapsta family, grandson Henry Mardisalu, followed in their footsteps to became a silversmith.
