= Walker (mobility) =

Apparatus to help one walk

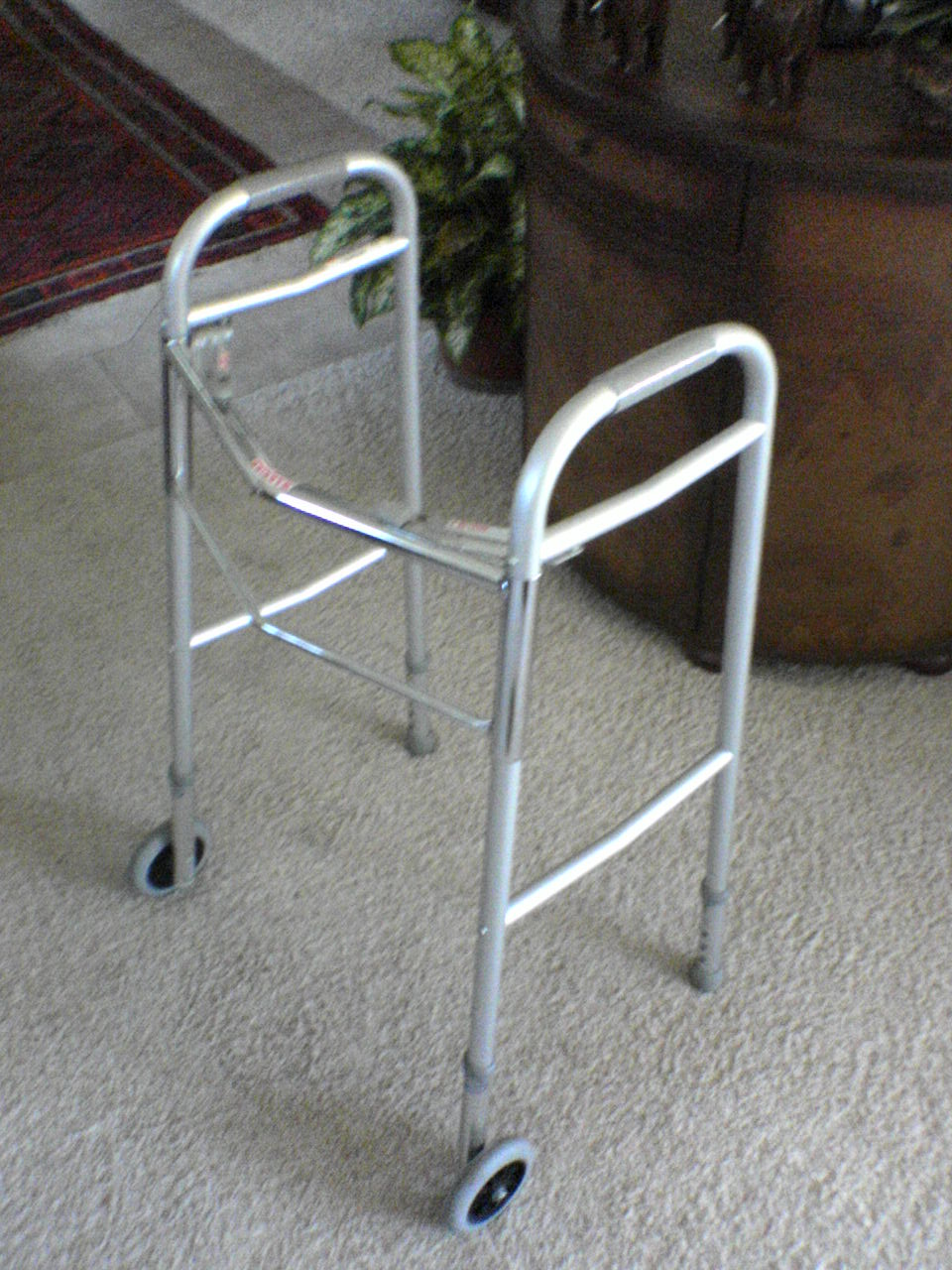
Front-wheeled walker

A walker (North American English) or walking frame (British English) is a device that gives support to maintain balance or stability while walking, most commonly due to age-related mobility disability, including frailty. Another common equivalent term for a walker is a Zimmer (frame), a genericised trademark from Zimmer Biomet, a major manufacturer of such devices and joint replacement parts. Walking frames have two front wheels, and there are also wheeled walkers available having three or four wheels, also known as rollators.

Walkers started appearing in the early 1950s. The first US patent was awarded in 1953 to William Cribbes Robb, of Stretford, UK, for a device called "walking aid", which had been filed with the British patent office in August 1949. Two variants with wheels were both awarded US patents in May 1957, and the first non-wheeled design that was called a "walker" was patented in 1965 by Elmer F. Ries of Cincinnati, Ohio. The first walker to resemble modern walkers was patented in 1970 by Alfred A. Smith of Van Nuys, California.

== Design ==
The basic design consists of a lightweight frame that is about waist high, approximately 12 inches (30 cm) deep and slightly wider than the user. Walkers are also available in other sizes such as pediatric (for children) or bariatric (for obese persons). Modern walkers are height adjustable and should be set at a height that is comfortable for the user, but will allow the user to maintain a slight bend in their arms. This bend is needed to allow for proper blood circulation through the arms as the walker is used. The front two legs of the walker may or may not have wheels attached, depending on the strength and abilities of the person using it. It is also common to see caster wheels or glides on the back legs of a walker with wheels on the front; additionally felt products adapted to glide with the legs such as adhesive feet, along with tennis balls with holes cut into them to place them onto the legs are also utilized on surfaces such as hardwood, epoxy and linoleum flooring common to institutions.

== Use ==
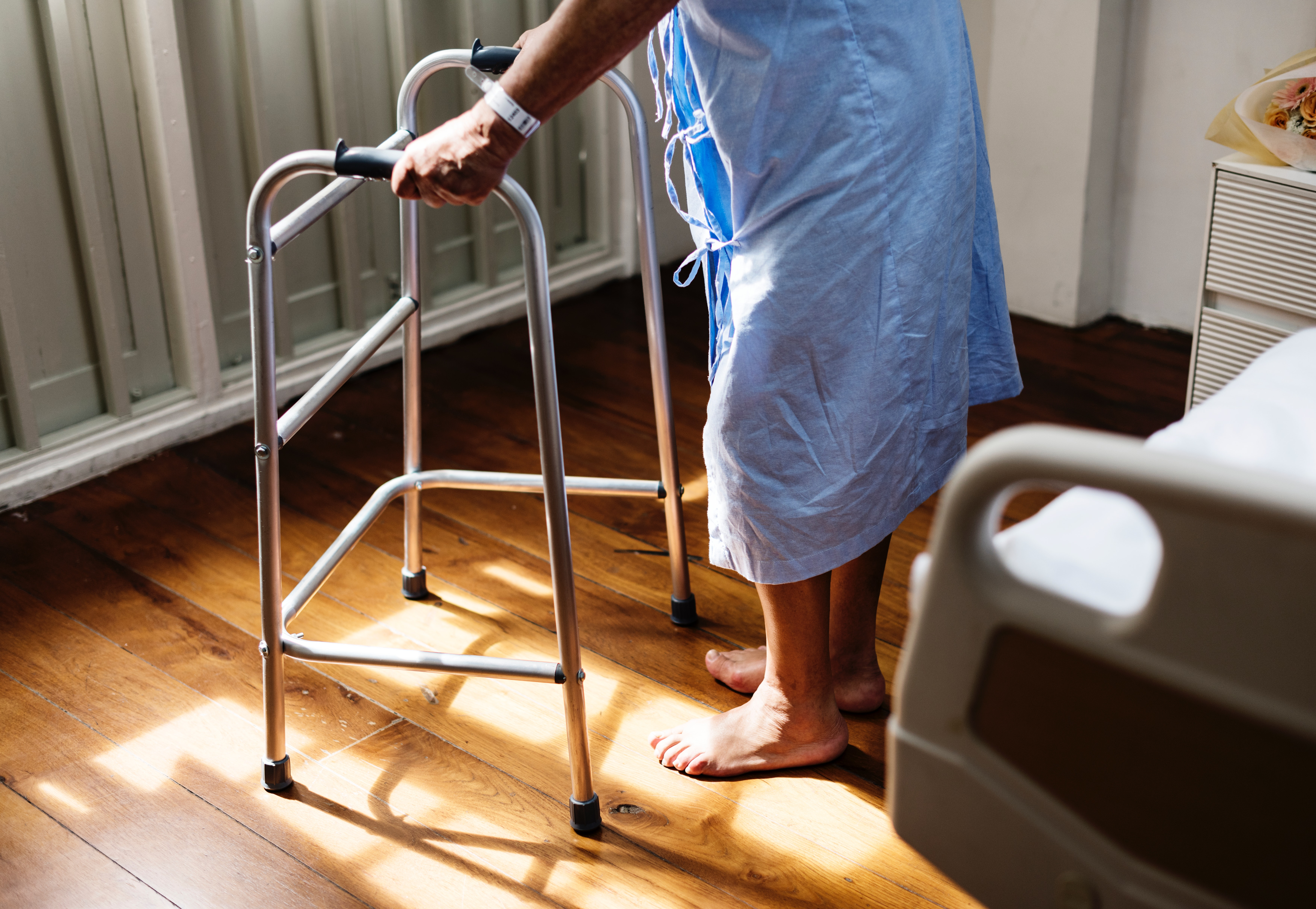
A woman supporting her weight using a walking frame without wheels

The person walks with the frame surrounding their front and sides and their hands provide additional support by holding on to the top of the sides of the frame. Traditionally, a walker is picked up and placed a short distance ahead of the user. The user then walks to it and repeats the process. With the use of wheels and glides, the user may push the walker ahead as opposed to picking it up. This makes for easier use of the walker, as it does not require the user to use their arms to lift the walker. This is beneficial for those with little arm strength.

A walker is often used by those who are recuperating from leg or back injuries. It is also commonly used by persons having problems with walking or with mild balance problems.

Also related is a hemi-walker, a walker about half the size of a traditional walker which is intended for use by persons whose dexterity is limited or non-existent in one hand or arm. These walkers are more stable than a quad cane (a cane with four points that touch the ground, as opposed to one), but are not recommended as highly as a traditional walker for those who can use it.

== Walker cane hybrid ==
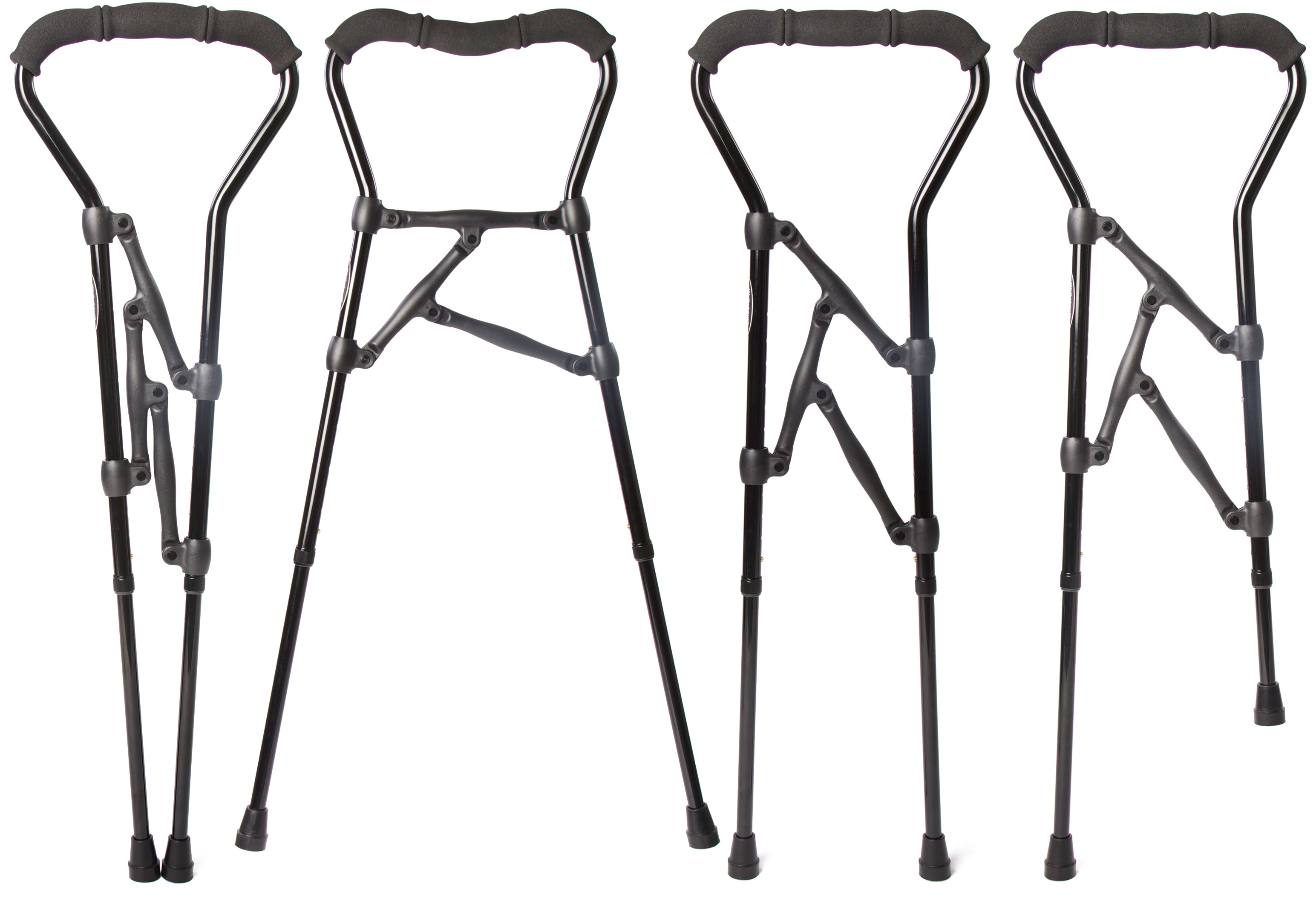
A walker cane hybrid adjusted to four configurations

A walker cane hybrid was introduced in 2012 designed to bridge the gap between an assistive cane and a walker. The hybrid has two legs which provide lateral (side-to-side) support which a cane does not. It can be used with two hands in front of the user, similar to a walker, and provides an increased level of support compared with a cane. It can be adjusted for use with either one or two hands, at the front and at the side, as well as a stair climbing assistant. The hybrid is not designed to replace a walker which normally has four legs and provides four-way support using both hands.

== Rollators ==
A different approach to the walker is the rollator, also called wheeled walker, invented by the Swede Aina Wifalk in 1978. Wifalk had polio. Although originally a brand name, "rollator" has become a genericized trademark for wheeled walkers in many countries, and is also the most common type of walker in several European countries.

The rollator consists of a frame with three or four large wheels, handlebars and a built-in seat, which allows the user to stop and rest when needed. Rollators are also often equipped with a shopping basket. Rollators are typically more sophisticated than conventional walkers with wheels. They are adjustable in height and are light-weight, yet sturdier than conventional walkers. The handlebars are equipped with hand brakes that can be lifted or pushed downward to instantly stop the rollator. The brakes can also be used in maneuvering the rollator; by braking one side while turning the rollator towards that side a much tighter turning radius can be achieved.

A study in the 2000s found an increase in the use of rollators by young people "usually in their thirties who are setting a new standard for walking among young people". The researchers conclude that this might be helpful in alleviating the stigma that using a rollator currently carries.

A Norwegian-made version of Wifalk's rollator won the 2011 Red Dot Design Award in the "Life science and medicine" class. The European norm for walking aids EN ISO 11199-2:2005 applies to rollators and walking frames.

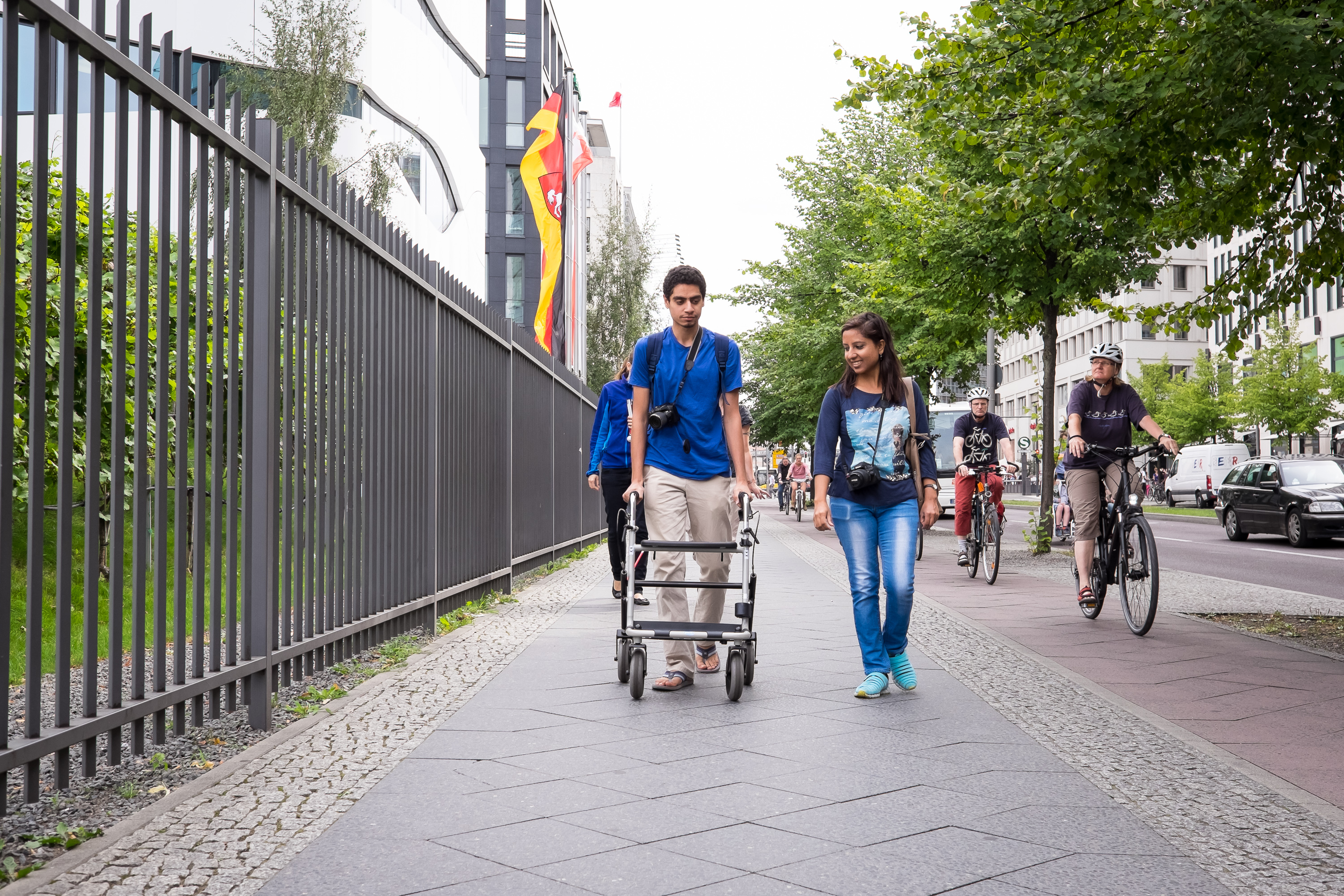

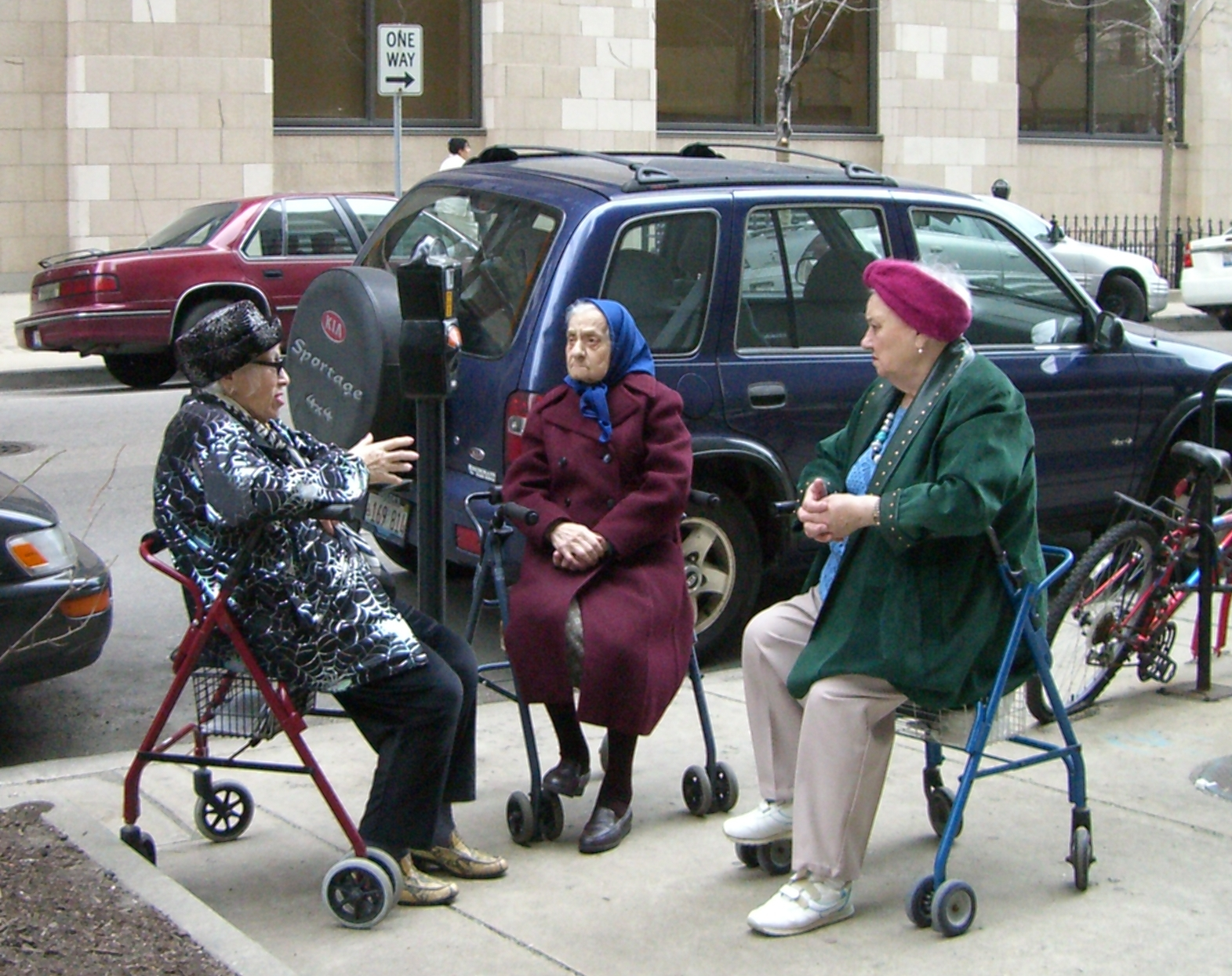

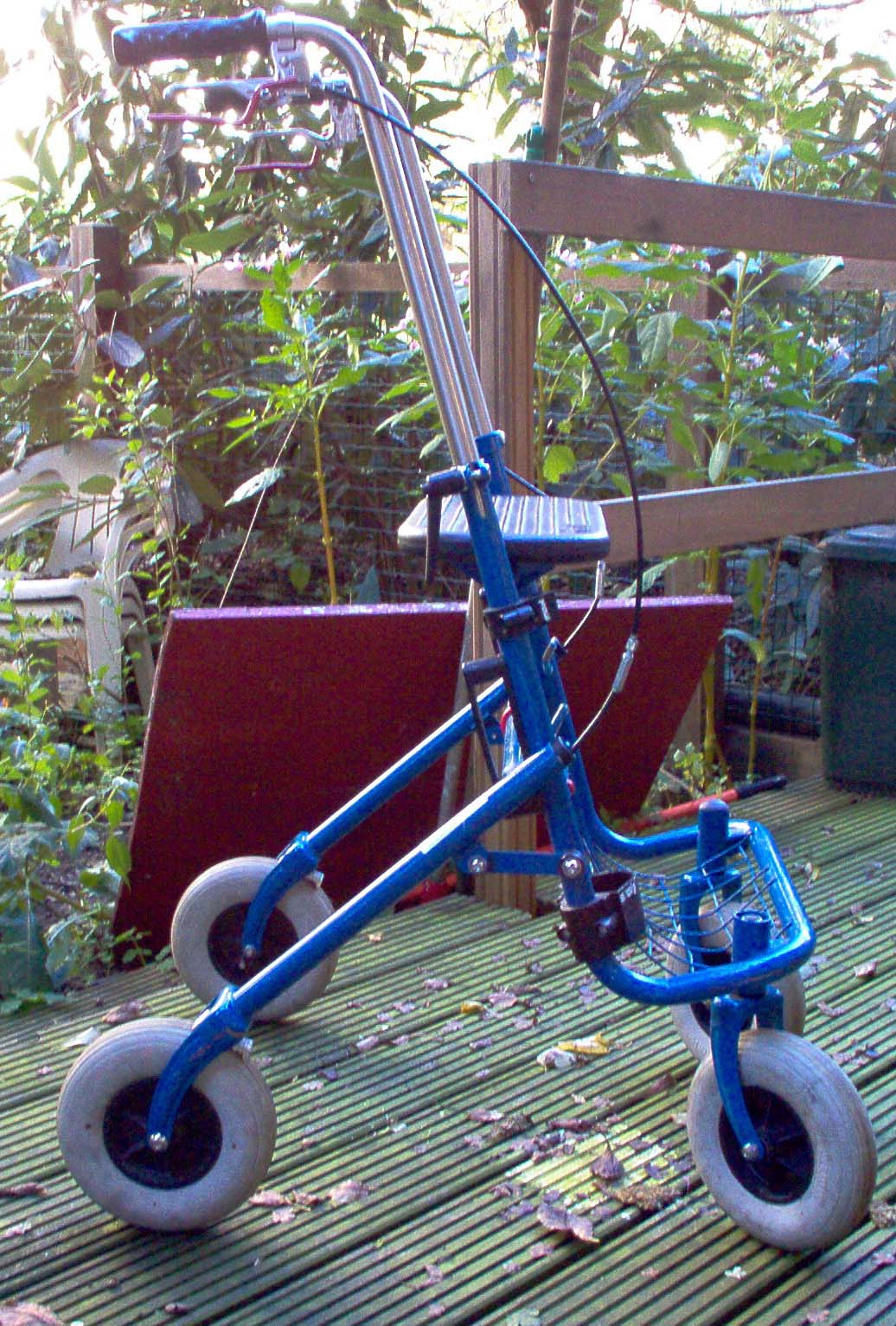
The original rollator, with hand brakes and a built-in seat, but without shopping basket

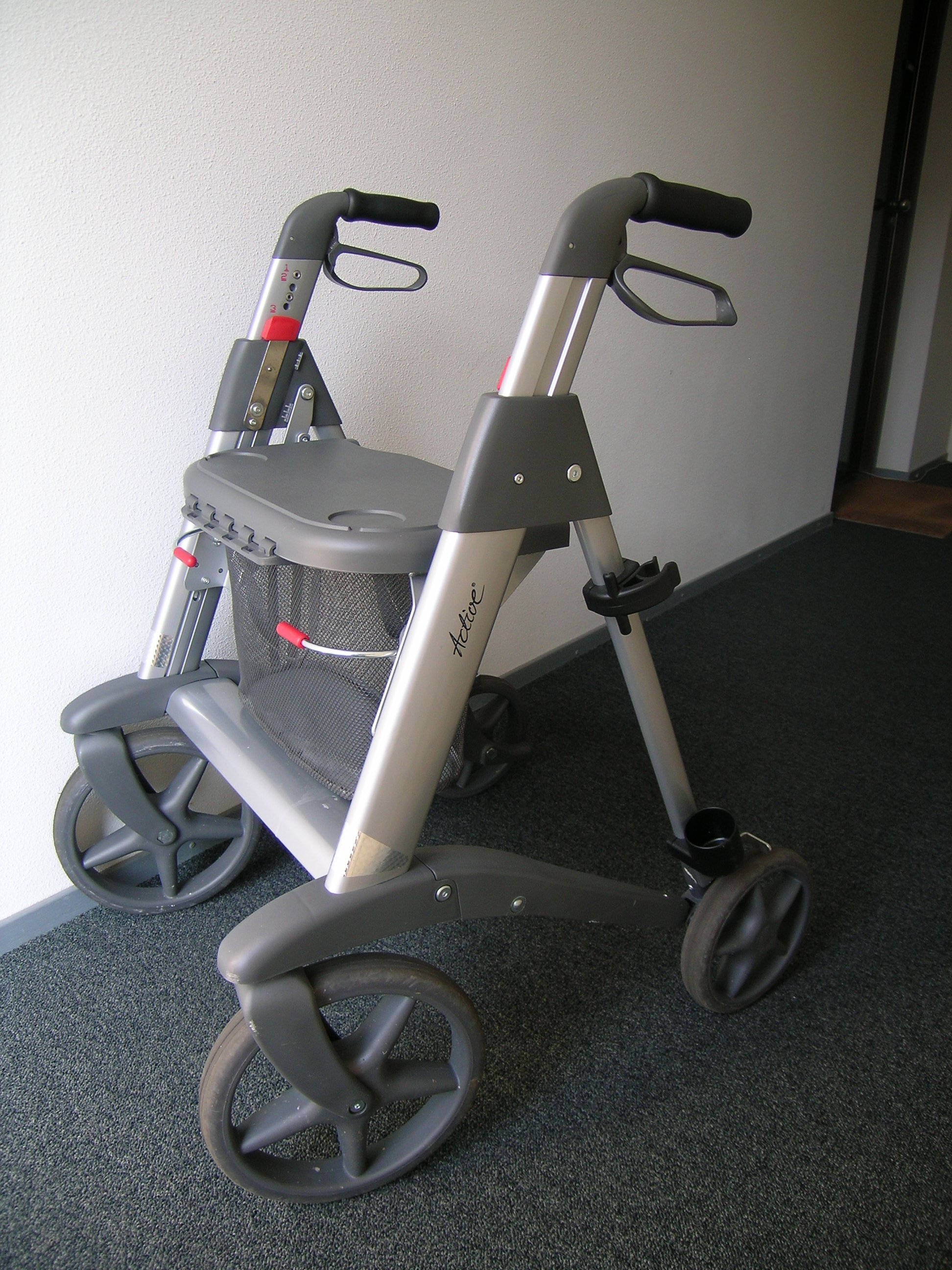
A later variant of the rollator, where the seat also serves as lid for the shopping basket

== Disabled dog walker ==
This type of walker provides support and stability to the dogs, while allowing them to rely partly on their hind legs and continue using them. It is suitable for dogs with mobility problems with hind legs (or unstable). It also helps them to exercise their back legs and can help maintain any partial mobility they may have left or, in some cases, help to improve it.

== See also ==
- Baby walker
- Assistive technology
