= Aina Karlsone =

Latvian artist and author (1935–2012)

- Born: Aina Ausma Zībiņa; 13 November 1935
- Died: 17 December 2012; Jēkabpils, Latvia
- Known for: Ex libris

Aina Karlsone (13 November 1935 – 17 December 2012) was a Latvian artist and author.

Karlsone gained prominence as an exlibriste, producing approximately 3100 works in her lifetime. Her works were featured in exhibitions both internationally and nationally, including at the Latvian National Library and the Art Academy of Latvia Library.

== Bibliography ==
- Klūdziņu un sloksnīšu pinumi (1992)
- Mašīnizšūšana (2000)
- Grāmatzīmes Jēkabpils novadam (2004)
- Īpašuma, cieņas un pateicības zīme – Ex libris (2005)
