= Aina More =

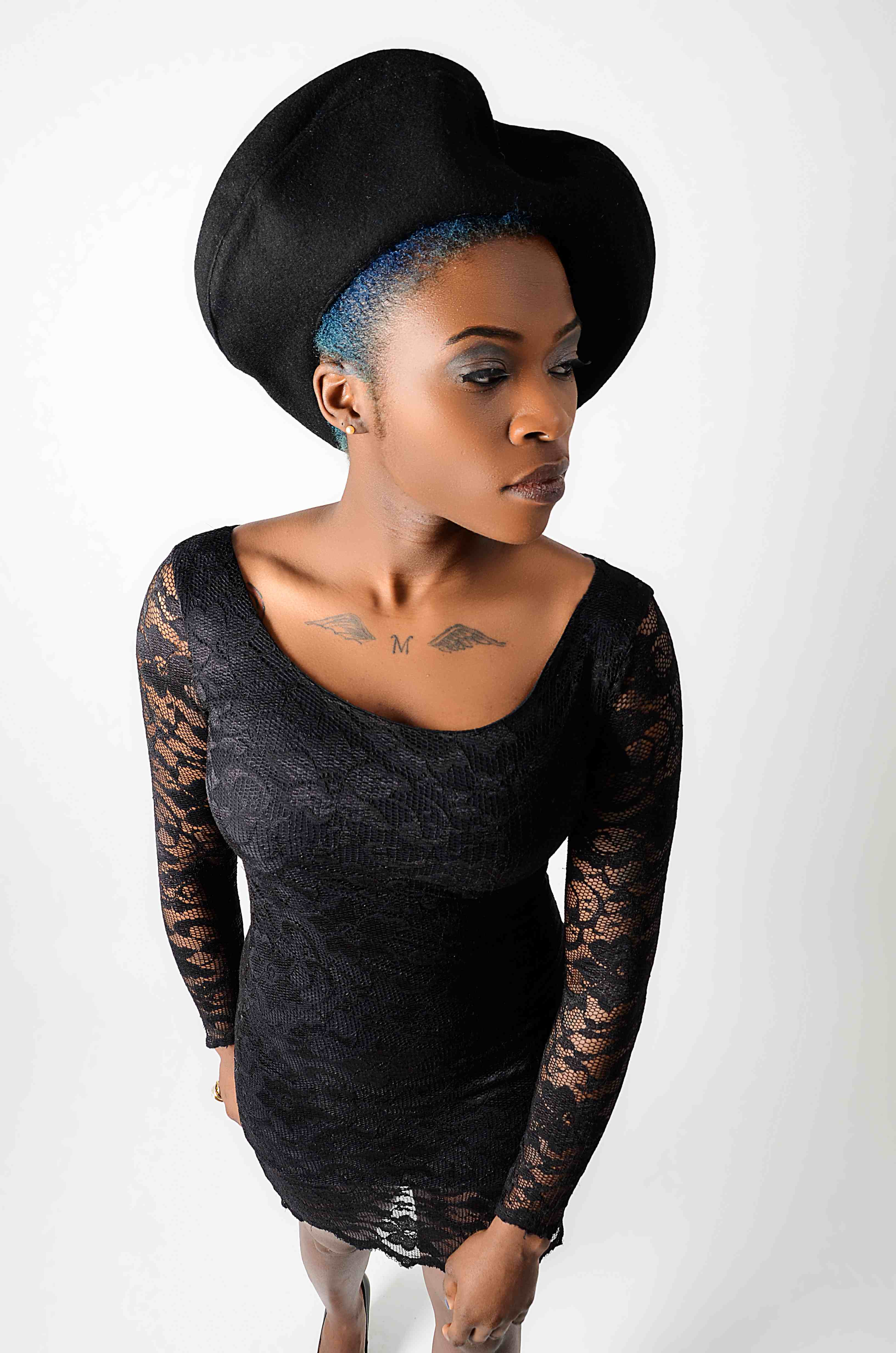

Background information
- Also known as: Miss More
- Born: Aina Moreniké; 12 May 1999 (age 26)
- Origin: London, England
- Genres: UK rap, soul music, spoken word, poetry,
- Years active: 2010–present
- Website: ainamore.com

Aina Morenike Olukoga (born 12 May 1999) better known by her stage name Aina More is a British MC, singer and actor.

== Career ==
Aina More makes soul and hip hop music. She won Best Contemporary Upper in the Big Music Project put together with Capital FM and The Brit Awards and put on a performance which had judges compare her to Lauryn Hill.

=== 2012: It's A W.R.A.P. (Words, Rhymes And Poetry) ===
More began recording freestyles over hip hop instrumentals. In November 2012, Aina More independently released a 10 track mixtape entitled It's A W.R.A.P., influenced by the political situation in Nigeria.

=== 2014–2015: For People With Short Attention Spans ===
After releasing several more singles and gaining recognition in the UK Music Scene, Aina More opened for Professor Green at The Roundhouse, for the London leg of his Growing Up in Public Tour. In February 2015, More gave a performance in London which won her the Contemporary Upper Award for The Big Music Project. In April 2015, Aina More released her second EP, For People With Short Attention Spans, which she further explained 'For People With Short Attention Spans' caters to people who want to feel and be stimulated by different things, but in this case, I'm giving you different dimensions of soul and sounds, there are ups and downs – much like life".

=== 2015 – Present: Girls Killing It ===
After garnering much attention from the UK and Nigerian scene, More released her critically acclaimed single "Girls Killing It". Produced by Ghanaian DJ and Producer DJ Juls which caught the attention of DJ Semtex who has named her as one to look out for on BBC 1Xtra, performed live during Aina More's performance opening for Lauryn Hill in Lagos, Nigeria, in August 2015.

== Discography ==
=== EPs ===
Title	Details
Back To Life: EP	Released: 20 June 2011; Formats: Free digital download

Title	Details
For People With Short Attention Spans	Released: 16 April 2015; Formats: Physical Release, Digital download

=== Mixtapes ===
Title	Details
It's A W.R.A.P. (Words, Rhymes And Poetry)	Released: 12 November 2012; Formats: Digital download

==== As lead artist ====
Year	Song	Album
2014	"Layback"	For People With Short Attention Spans
2015	"Girls Killing It"	Non-album single
