= Aina Apse =

New Zealand potter (1926–2015)

Aina Apse (25 March 1926 – 24 February 2015) was a New Zealand potter. Her work is held in the permanent collections of Canterbury Museum and Christchurch Art Gallery.

== Biography ==
Apse was born in Latvia. She and her family escaped to Germany in 1944 when the Soviet Union invaded Latvia, and in 1949 Apse, her husband and their son emigrated to New Zealand. The family was initially placed in a camp at Pahiatua, then moved to the East Coast, Napier and later to Christchurch. In 1965, Apse joined a night class in pottery and in the 1970s and 1980s she exhibited her work and won some local prizes. Apse was married and had two children: a son born in Europe and a daughter born in New Zealand. She divorced her husband in 1965.

Apse died in February 2015.
