= Aino-Maija Luukkonen =

Finnish politician (born 1958)

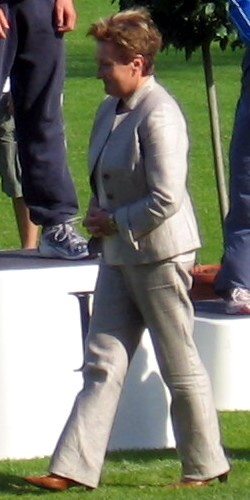
Luukkonen in 2009

Aino-Maija Luukkonen (born 14 October 1958 in Pyhämaa, Uusikaupunki) is the mayor of the Finnish city Pori. She stepped out of the mayor's place in July 2022 and is spending a vacation before retirement in March 2023.

She is a member of the Social Democratic Party of Finland (Suomen Sosialidemokraattinen Puolue).
