= Beverīna Municipality =

Former municipality of Latvia

Coordinates: 57°30′N 25°27′E

Beverīna Municipality Beverīnas novads
- Former municipality
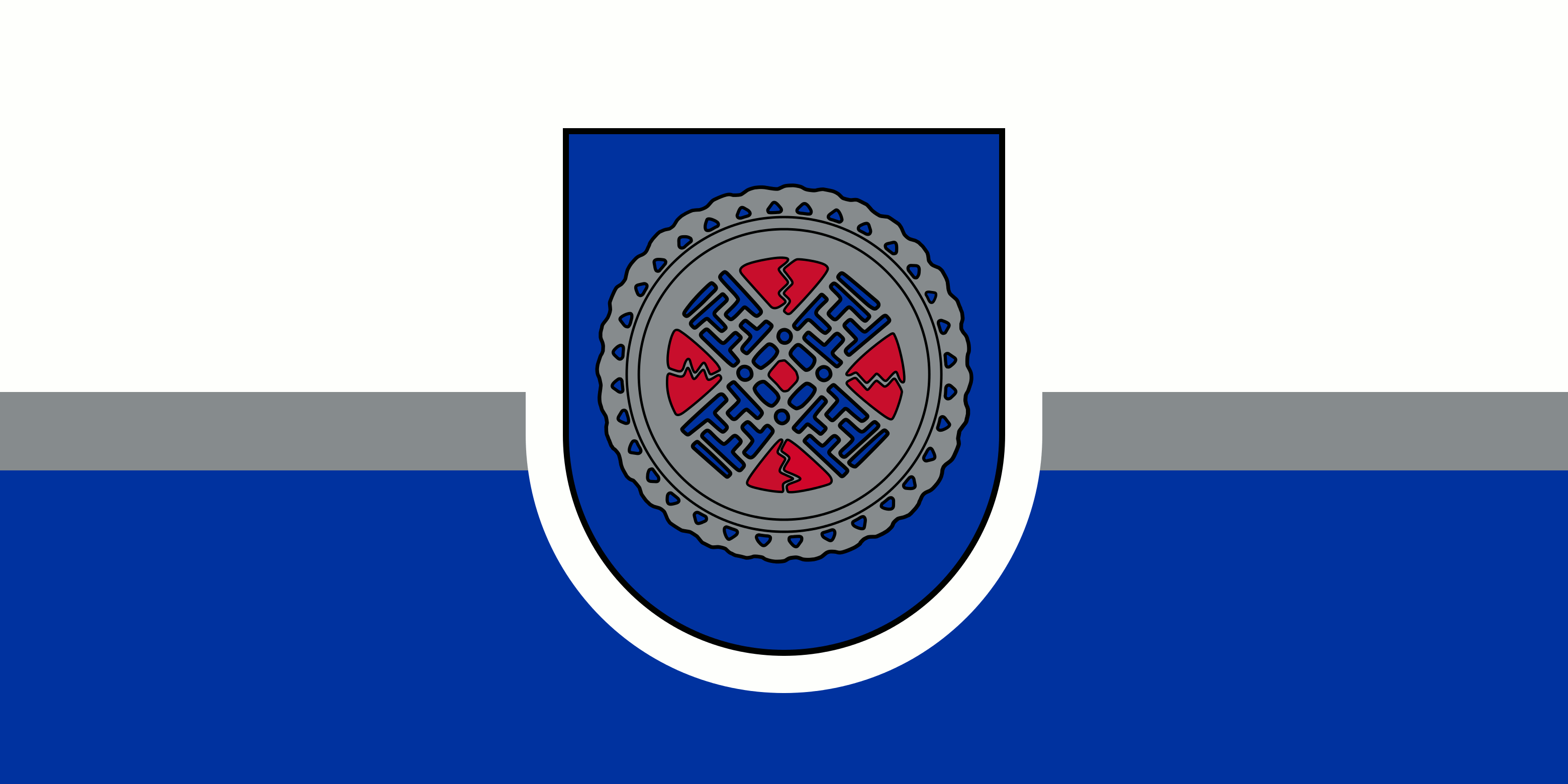
- Flag Coat of arms

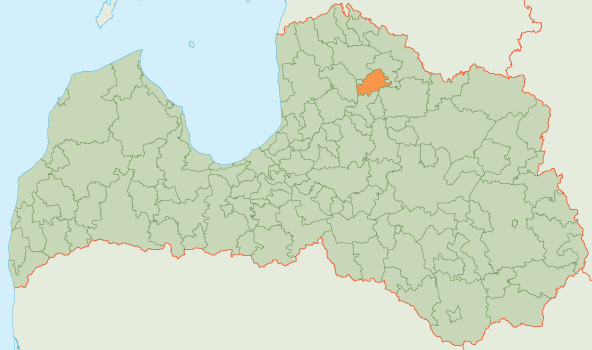
- Country: Latvia
- Formed: 2009
- Dissolved: 2021
- Centre: Mūrmuiža

Government
  - Chairman (last): Jānis Fūrmanis (For The Municipality)

Area
  - Total: 300.68 km^{2} (116.09 sq mi)
  - Land: 293.55 km^{2} (113.34 sq mi)
  - Water: 7.13 km^{2} (2.75 sq mi)

Population (2021)
  - Total: 2,948
  - Density: 10.04/km^{2} (26.01/sq mi)
- Website: www.beverinasnovads.lv

Beverīna Municipality (Latvian: Beverīnas novads) was a municipality in Vidzeme, Latvia. It was formed in 2009 by merging Brenguļi Parish and Kauguri Parish of the former Valmiera district, and Trikāta Parish of the Valka district. The administrative centre was the village of Mūrmuiža. On 1 July 2021, Beverīna Municipality ceased to exist as it was merged into Valmiera Municipality.

The name of the municipality derived from Beverīna Castle, the seat of power for the historic Latgalian rulers of Tālava.

== Geography ==
The municipality was geographically well positioned, bordering on the republican city of Valmiera, Beverīna Municipality also shared borders with Burtnieki, Kocēni, Priekuļi, Smiltene and Strenči Parishes (Counties).

Beverīna County was rich in valuable nature resources and culture and historical sites. Part of the county's territory was included in the Gauja National Park and Protected Landscape Area Ziemeļgauja. The River Gauja flowed through all three civil parishes while its biggest tributaries the Abuls, Miegupe and Lisa not only provide great views, but are also closely related to historical events.

== Population ==
Parish	Population (year)
Brenguļi Parish	858 (2018)
Kauguri Parish	1393 (2018)
Trikāta Parish	896 (2018)

== See also ==
- Administrative divisions of Latvia (2009)
