= Sēja Manor =

Manor house in Latvia

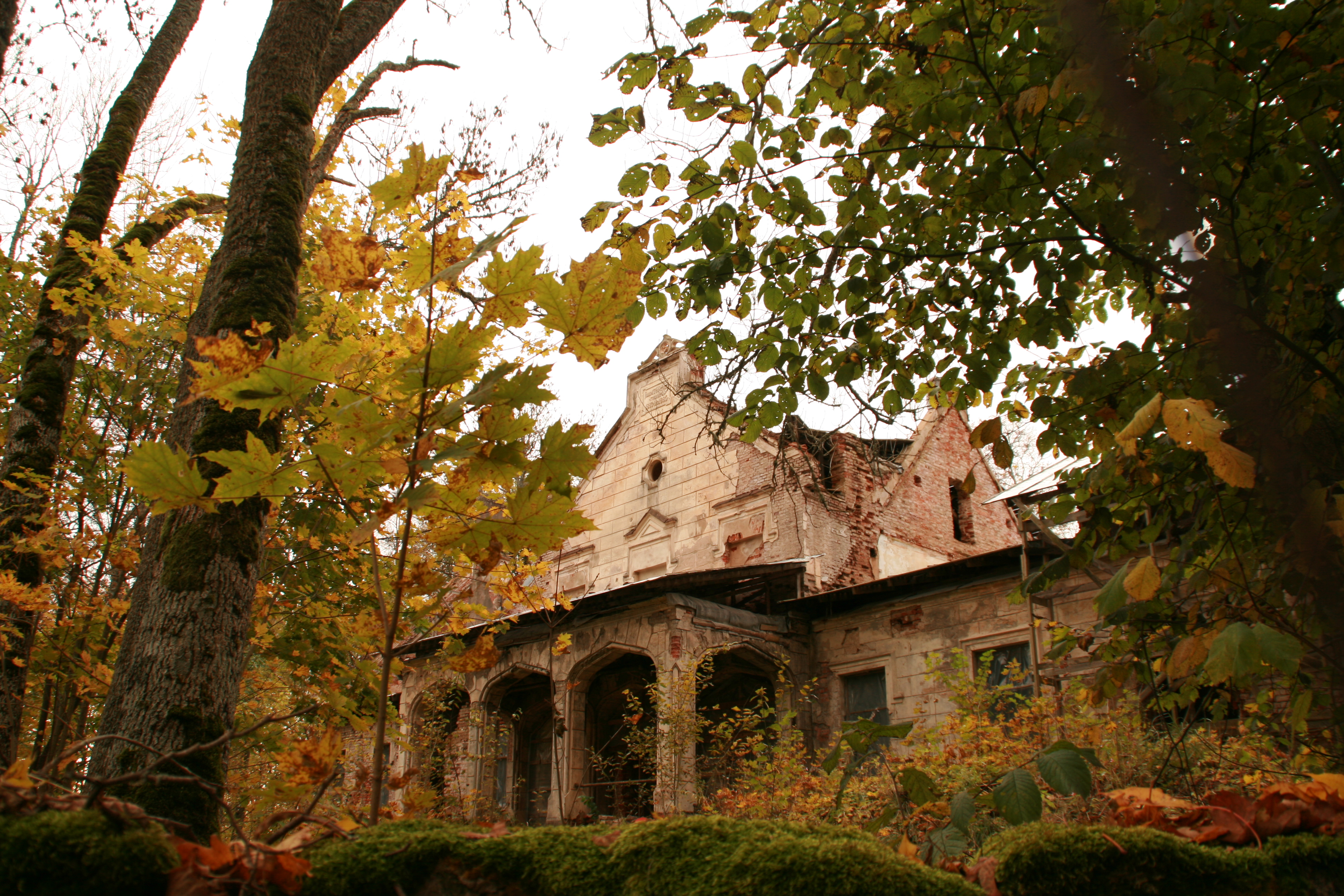
- The ruins of Sēja Manor main building in 2011.

- Location within Latvia
- Alternative names: Zögenhof, Ennenberg

General information
- Status: Ruins
- Architectural style: Neo-Gothic, Baroque
- Location: Sēja, Saulkrasti Municipality, Latvia
- Coordinates: 57°11′54.5″N 24°35′28.8″E
- Completed: 1766
- Renovated: 1883—1885 (rebuilt)

Technical details
- Material: Brick
- Floor count: 2

Other information
- Number of rooms: 22

Sēja Manor (Latvian: Sējas muiža; German: Zögenhof) is a knight's manor in Saulkrasti Municipality in the Vidzeme region of Latvia. It was formerly situated in Kreis Riga in the Governorate of Livonia.

== History ==
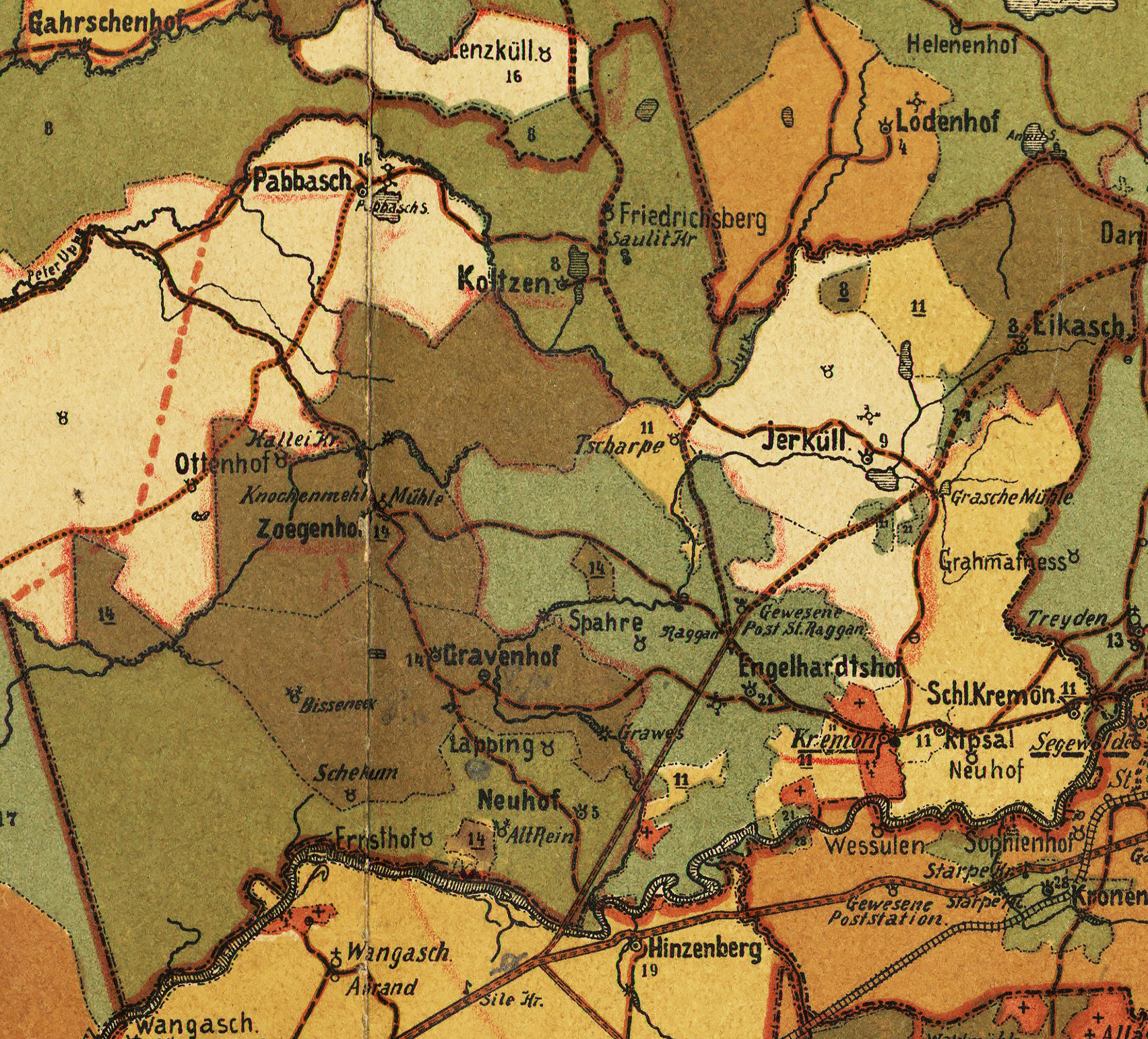
Sēja Manor (Gut Zögenhof) land holdings marked with number 14 on the 1905 map.

The manor, which used to be named Ennenberg, was acquired by Johan Seyge (Zöge) in 1577. The Latvian name of Sēja Manor comes from the surname of the previous landlord, Andrejs Seija. The present ruined manor house was first built in 1766. From 1751 until the Latvian agrarian reform in the 1920s, the manor belonged to the noble Dunten family, which was related to the famous Münchhausen family. Hieronymus Carl Friedrich von Münchhausen spent several years in Livonia and in 1744 married Jacobine von Dunten, daughter of baron von Dunten. In 1883–1885 manor house was rebuilt and added sophisticated neo-Gothic decorations to its modest baroque mansion features – openwork cast iron castings, balustrades and sandrics.

As the count also had residences in Dunte (Ruthern), Mūrmuiža (Muremoise), Skulte and Germany, during his absence the main supervisor of the manor was majordomo Tor, later Apsītis and Eduards Siliņš.

The manor, depicted in maps from the 1790s, was situated adjacent to a lake that was later drained and ceased to appear on maps after 1905.

After state of Latvia confiscated manor from von Dunten family in 1920, the property was divided into smaller land lots and in manor house a club was established. In Soviet Latvia from 1963 to 1968, the manor house hosted club of the collective farm "Komunārs" and also library operated there. At the beginning of the 1990s, the office of the 2nd district of the kolkhoz "Bolsheviks" operated in the manor. Presently building is partially collapsed and in state of ruins.

Besides main manor house property also has an old oak tree, 18th century granary and a water tower built in 1903.

== Archaeology ==
Artifacts from ancient Livonian stone box grave culture has been found on Sēja Manor land. They are similar to other Balti mound graves in the lower Gauja area, which were called batariņi. Ancient tombs were also in the wider region, but most likely, due to the spread of agriculture, many places were destroyed in ancient times. In the 19th century, Baltic-German archaeologists Georg Loeschcke, R. Hausmann, L. Schroeder and Anton Buchholtz excavated this type of mound graves and described them in the literature as the ancient graves of Neuhof or Zögenhof.

== Gallery ==
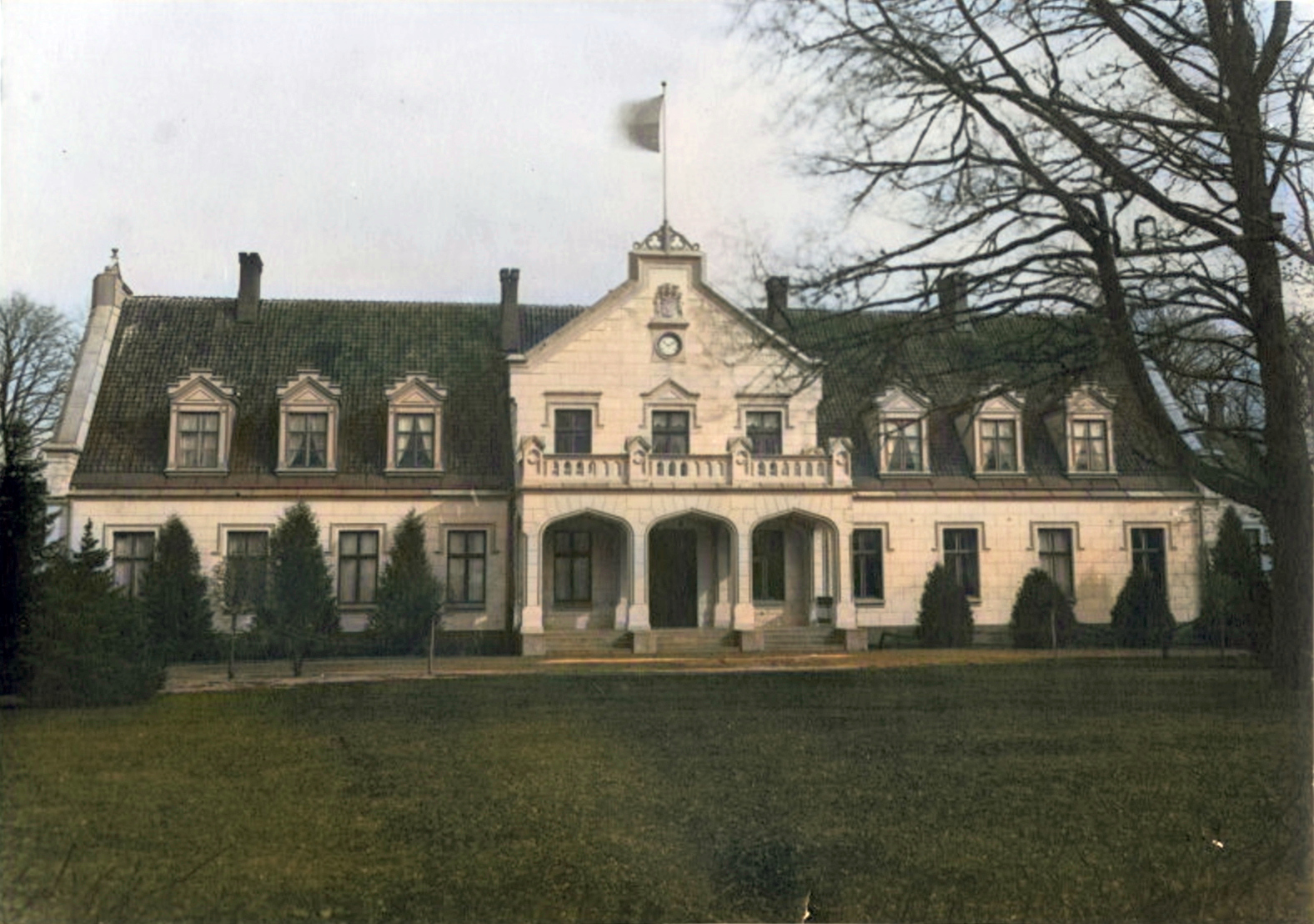
Seja manor around year 1910

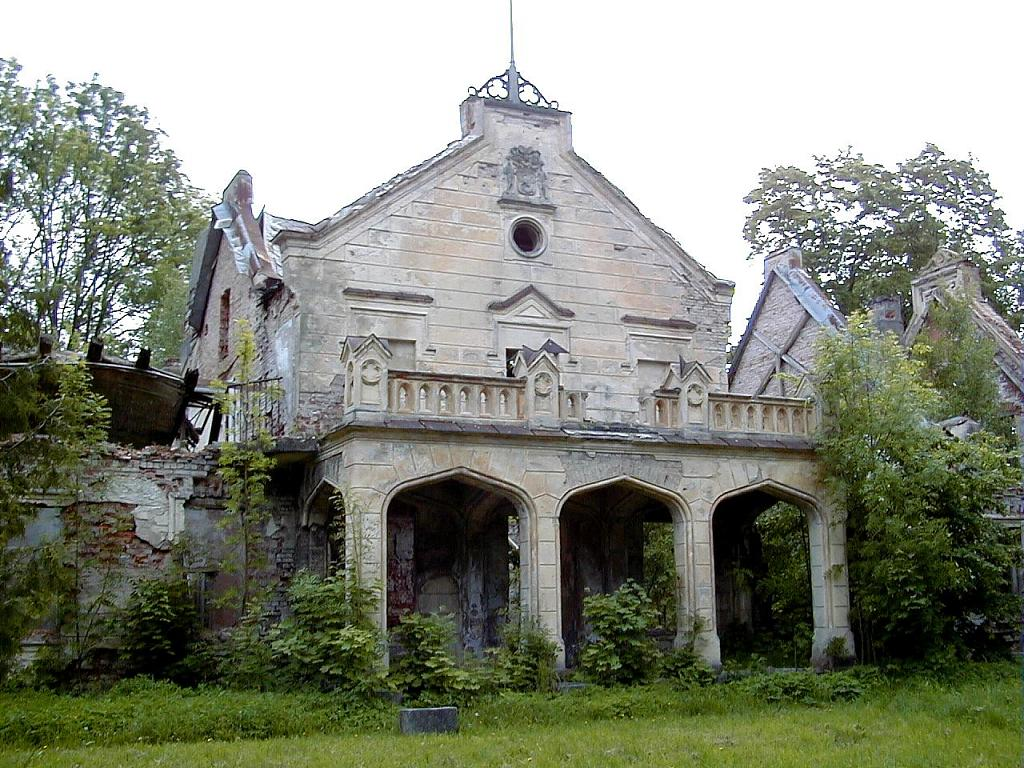
Seja manor in 2002

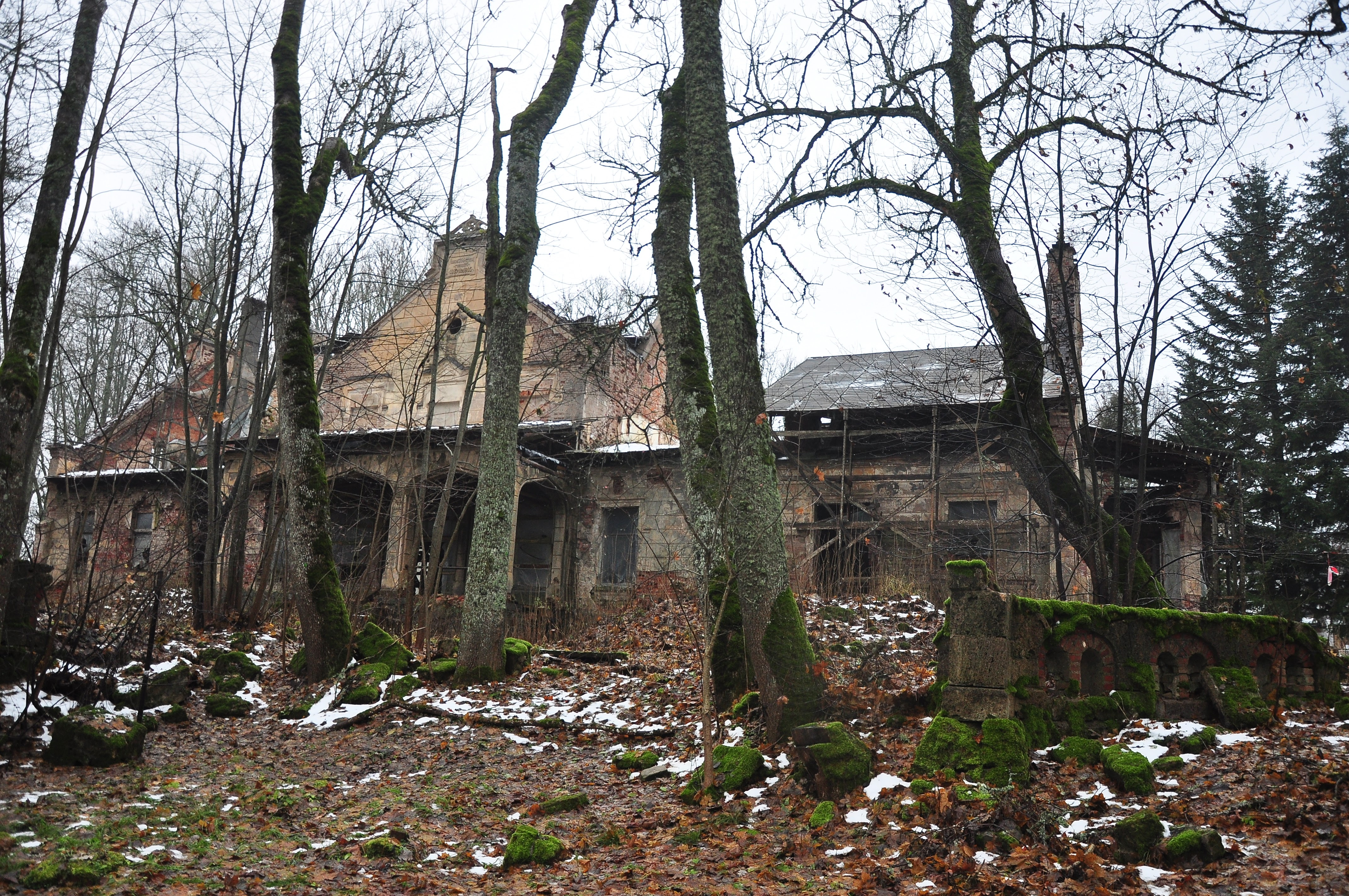
Seja manor in 2016

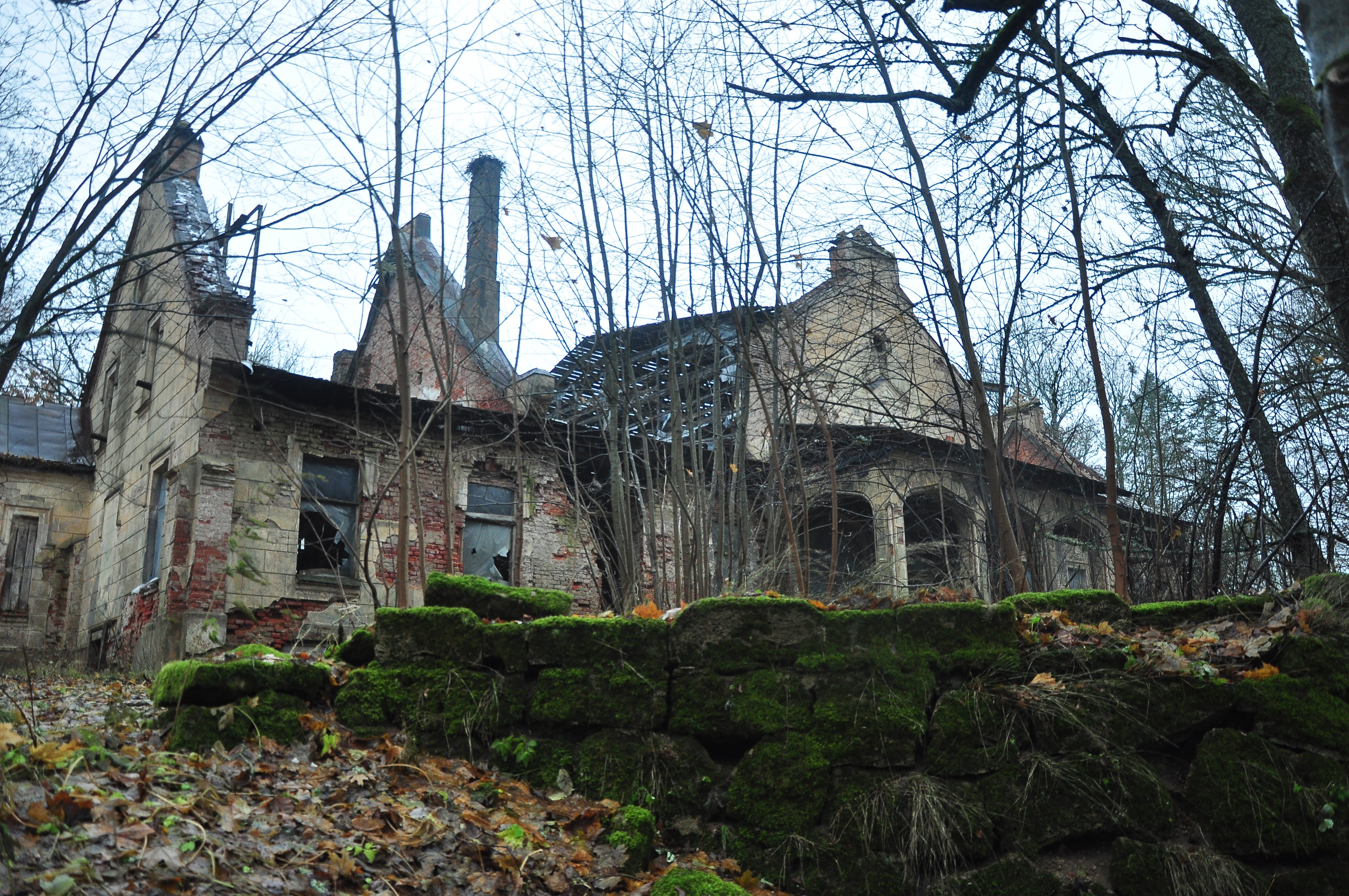

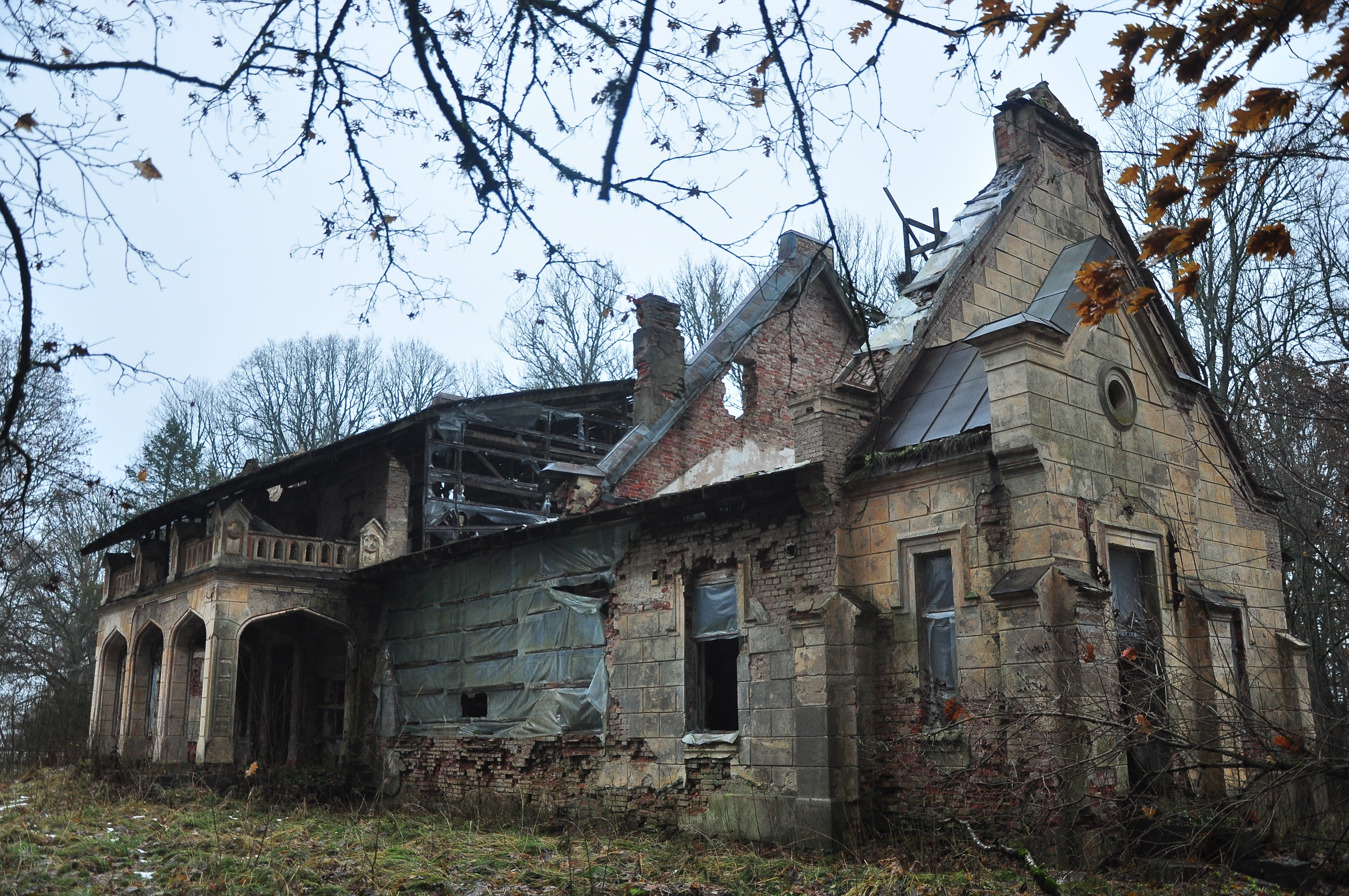

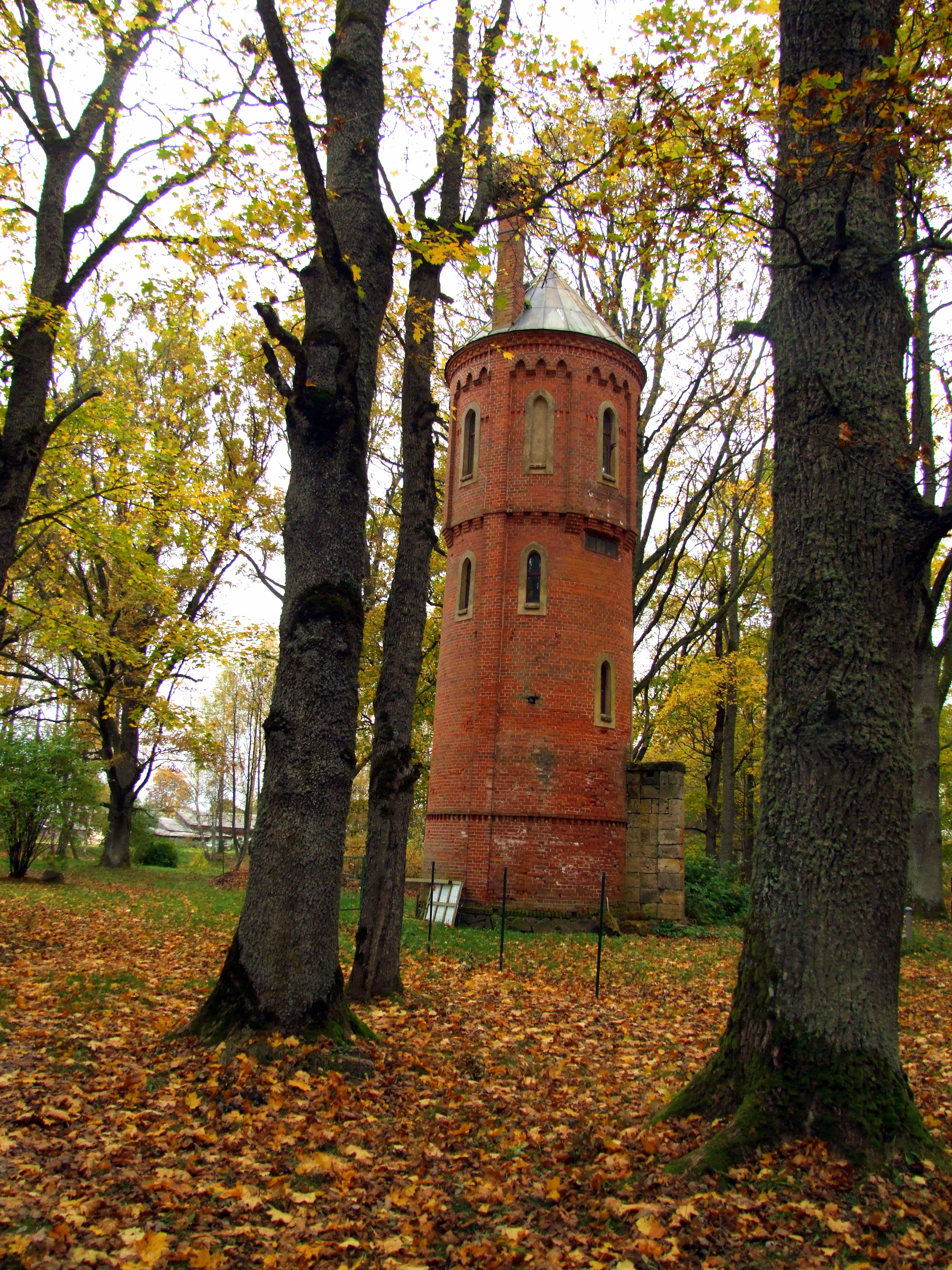
Water tower

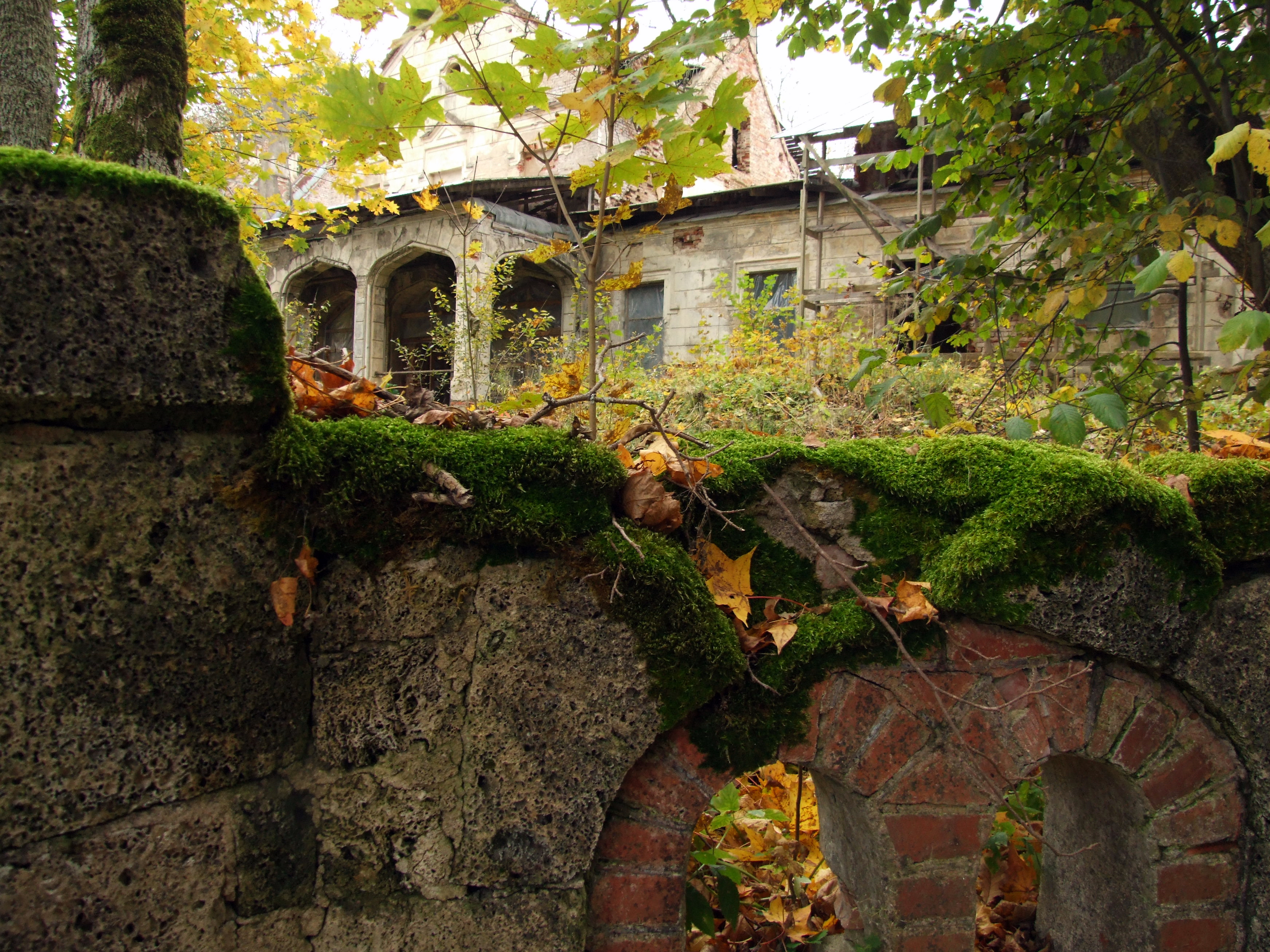

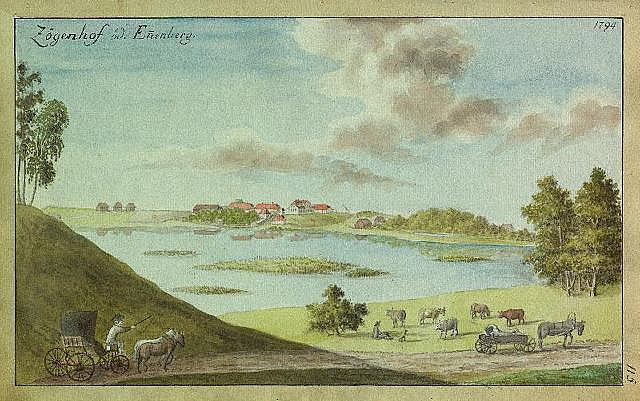
Lake, which was drained, was located near Seja manor. Drawing by Johann Christoph Brotze in 1794

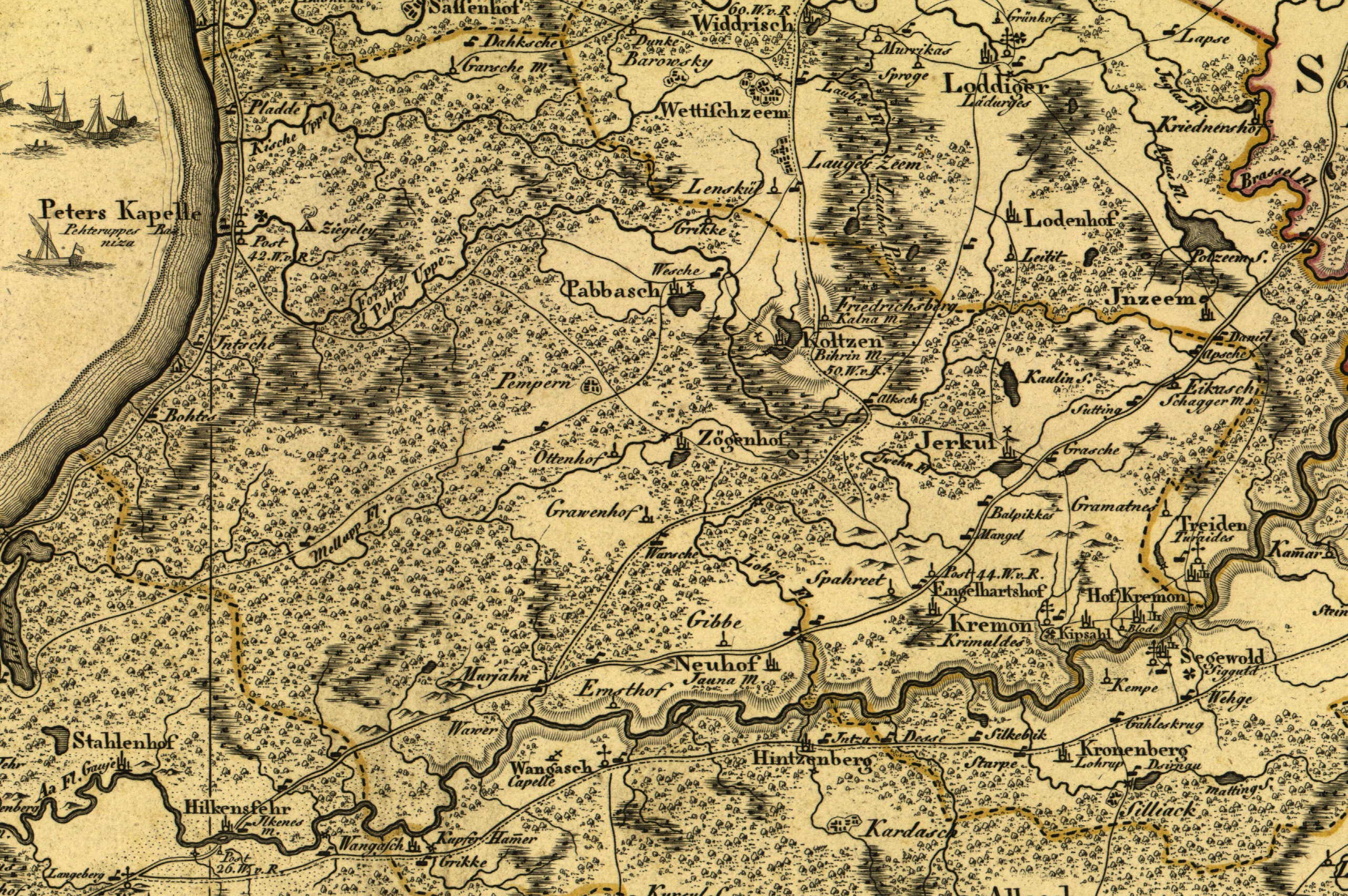
1791 map of Kirchspiel Kremon-St. Peters Capelle with location of Seja manor (Zogenhof) and the nearby lake

== See also ==
- List of palaces and manor houses in Latvia
