= Brenguļi Parish =

Parish in Valmiera Municipality, Latvia

- parish of Latvia
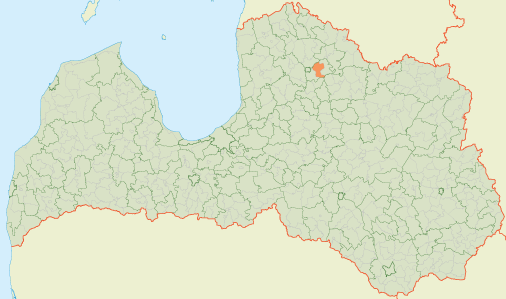
- 57°32′01″N 25°35′07″E
- Country: Latvia

Area
  - Total: 99.62 km^{2} (38.46 sq mi)
  - Land: 97.79 km^{2} (37.76 sq mi)
  - Water: 1.83 km^{2} (0.71 sq mi)

Population (1 January 2025)
  - Total: 895
  - Density: 9.15/km^{2} (23.7/sq mi)

Brenguļi Parish (Latvian: Brenguļu pagasts) is an administrative territorial entity of Valmiera Municipality, Latvia. The administrative center is the village of Brenguļi. Until 1925 it was called Vecbrenguļi Parish (Vecbrenguļu pagasts).

From 2009 until 2021, it was part of Beverīna Municipality. Prior to the 2009 administrative reforms it was a part of Valka county (until 1924), Valmiera county (1924–1940), and Valmiera district.

== Villages and settlements ==
- Brenguļi
- Cempi
- Cempmuiža
- Jaunvāle
