= Mūrmuiža =

Village in Valmiera Municipality, Latvia, center of Kauguri Parish

- Village
- Nereta's location in Latvia
- Coordinates: 57°28′23″N 25°29′30″E
- Country: Latvia
- Municipality: Valmiera
- Parish: Kauguri

Population
  - Total: 490

Mūrmuiža (German: Muremoise) is a village and the administrative center of Kauguri Parish, Valmiera Municipality, in the Vidzeme region of Latvia. Mūrmuiža had 497 residents as of 2006.

During the existence of Beverīna Municipality from 2009 to 2021, Mūrmuiža also served as its administrative center.

== Gallery ==
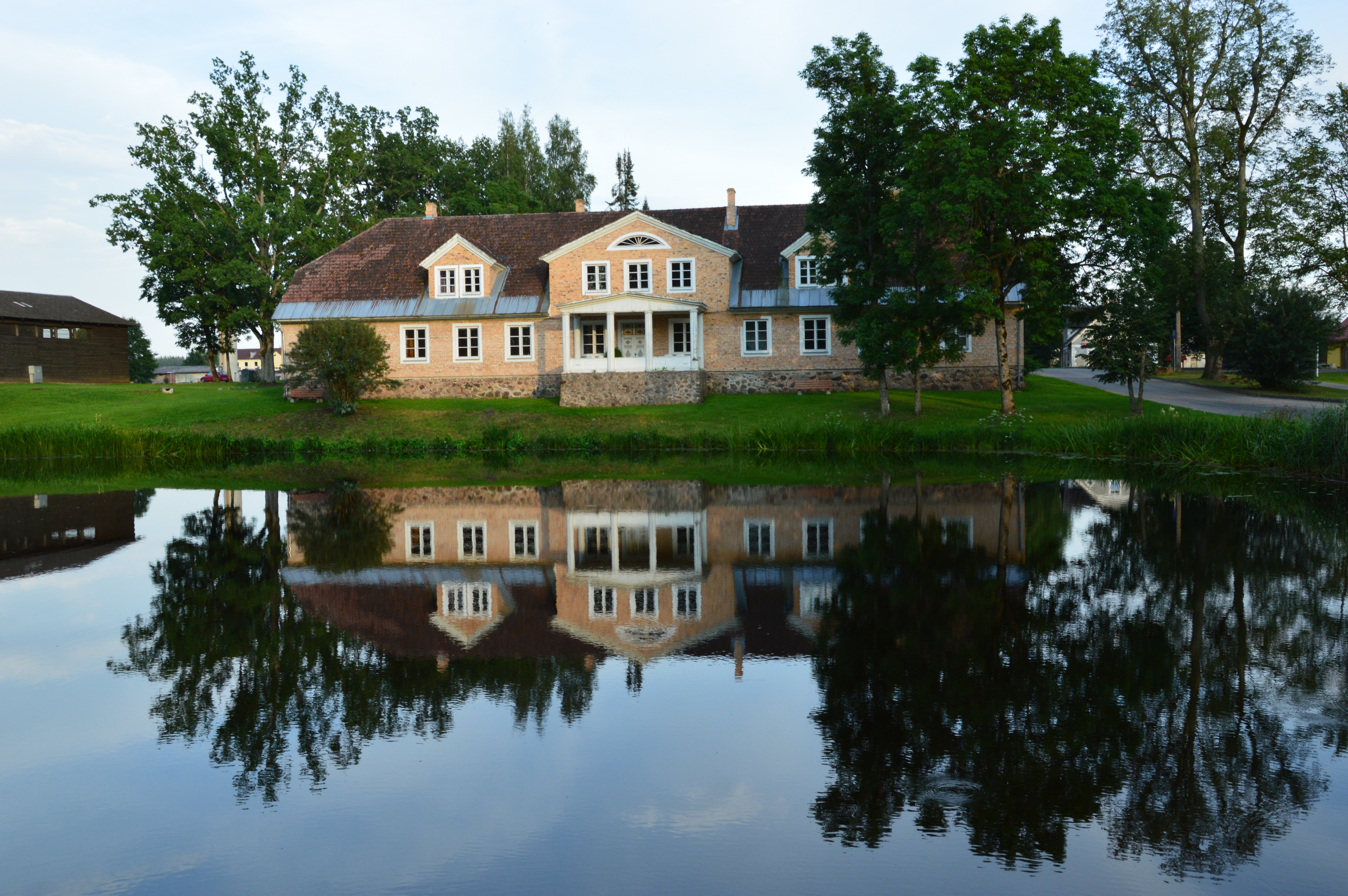

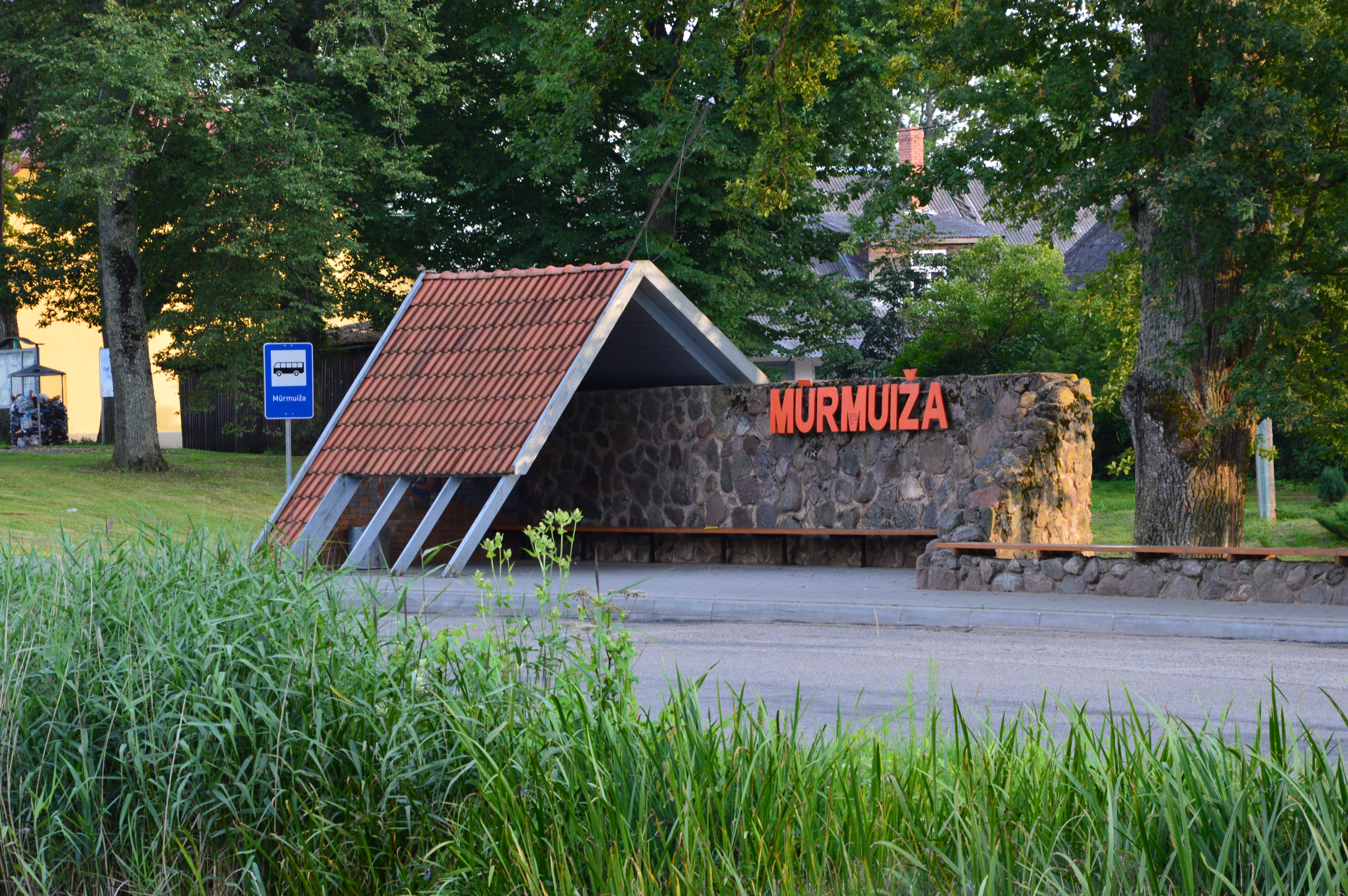

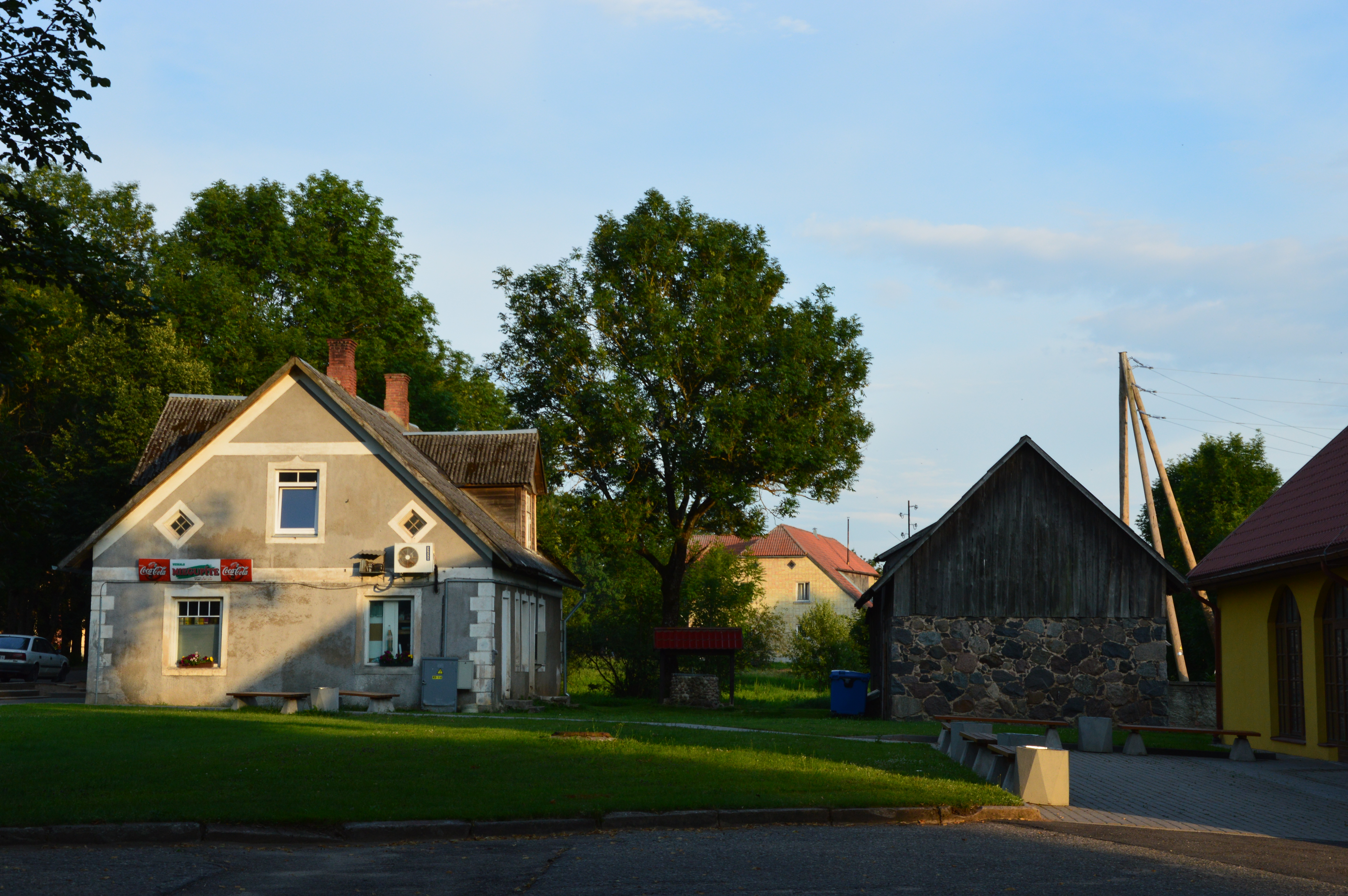

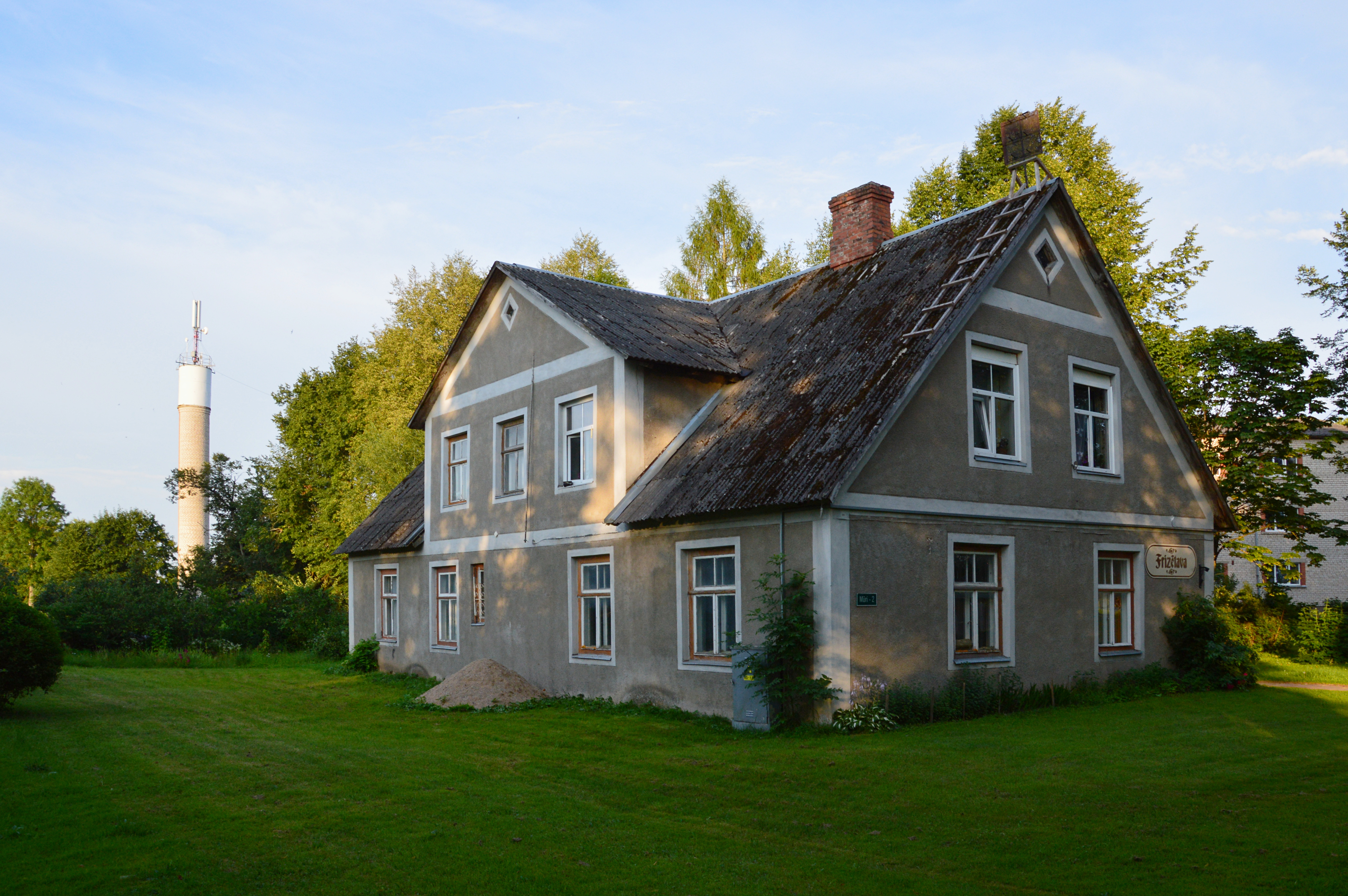

== See also ==
- Mūrmuiža Manor
