= Mūrmuiža Manor =

Manor house in Latvia

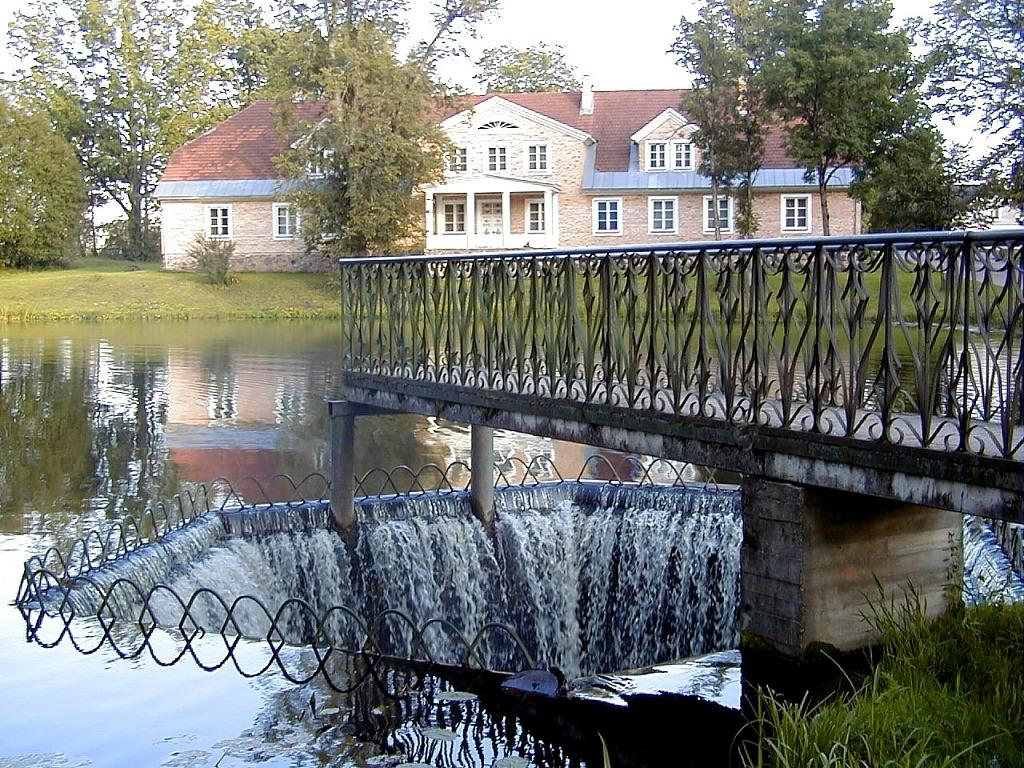

- Location within Latvia

General information
- Location: Kauguri Parish, Valmiera Municipality, Vidzeme, Mūrmuiža, Kauguri Parish, LV-4224, Latvia
- Coordinates: 57°28′30″N 25°29′23″E
- Completed: ~1850

Mūrmuiža Manor (Latvian: Mūrmuižas kungu māja, German: Gemauerthof) is a manor house in Mūrmuiža, Kauguri Parish, Valmiera Municipality, in the historical region of Vidzeme, in northern Latvia.

== History ==
Mūrmuiža Manor House was built during the 19th century. During the 1930s the estate housed a campus of the Latvian People's University (Latvijas Tautas universitātes Mūrmuižas nodaļa) under the leadership of Zenta Mauriņa. Since 1988 it has housed the Mūrmuiža People's University. Presently Parish administration and post office are sharing manor house.

Mūrmuiža is first mentioned in records from the 17th century. The oldest manor structure is a fortified tower built in the 16th century. Originally it was dwelling tower of the Livonia Order outside the town. As the chamber of the village it was first used for sacral and then commercial activities. The building also has a room set up in remembrance of Zenta Mauriņa.

== See also ==
- List of palaces and manor houses in Latvia
