= Ziemeļgauja =

Protected landscape area in Vidzeme, Latvia

- IUCN category V (protected landscape/seascape)
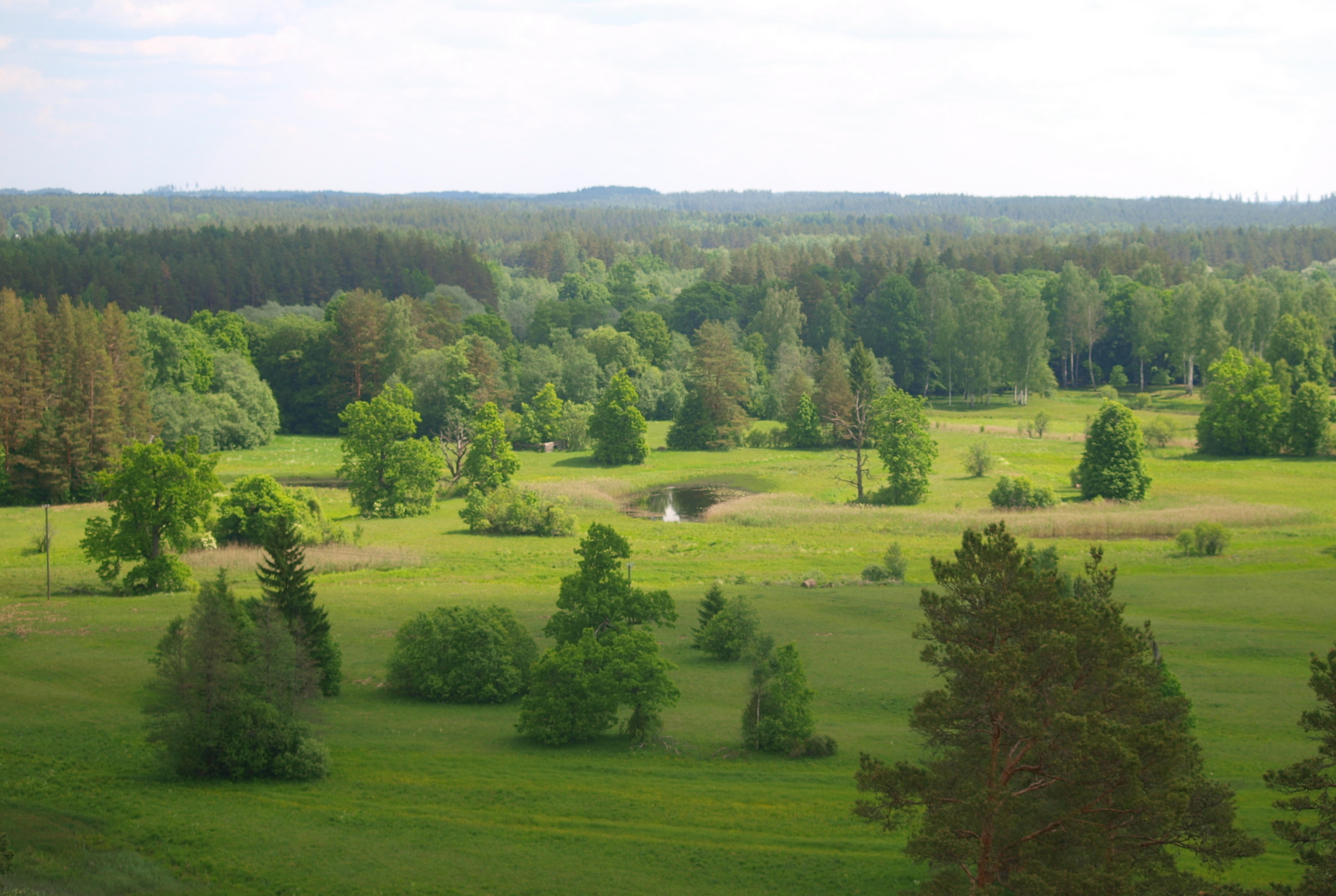
- View from the observation tower in Zvārtava parish to the Gauja and its old rivers

- Location within Latvia
- Location: Latvia, Vidzeme
- Nearest city: Valka
- Coordinates: 57°39′33″N 26°07′45″E
- Area: 21,749 ha (53,740 acres)
- Established: 2004

Ziemeļgauja ('North Gauja') is a protected landscape area in Ziemeļvidzeme (North Vidzeme), Latvia, with a total area of 21,749 ha, which was established in 2004 in a section of about 140 km along the Gauja middle stream and its valley. The territory of the park includes natural, unregulated river (Gauja) and its ancestral system, botanically valuable meadows, old mixed and deciduous forests. The park is part of a network of protected areas Natura 2000.

== Flora and fauna ==
There is a great diversity of rare Latvian and EU-wide specially protected habitats in the protected area, which is home to many very rare species of lichens, vascular plants, invertebrates and birds. So far, 126 specially protected species in Latvia have been identified in the protected landscape area "Ziemeļgauja": three fungi, nine species of lichens, four mosses, 13 vascular plants, 47 invertebrates, one reptile, one amphibian, four species of roundnose grenadier and fish, 35 species of birds and nine mammals, and 26 habitats of the EU Habitats Directive have been identified

== Tourist infrastructure ==
In recent years, the tourism infrastructure has been developed in the area - near the Gauja, in Valka district, Zvārtava Parish, a 27 m high observation tower has been created, from which you can see the Gauja, its bends and surroundings - meadows and forests, A 7 km long Kokši nature trail around four lakes has been created near Valka - Lake Leiši, Lake Zāļu, Lake Dziļais and Lake Dibena, which are connected by Kokšupīte river.
