= Kauguri Parish =

Parish of Latvia

- parish of Latvia
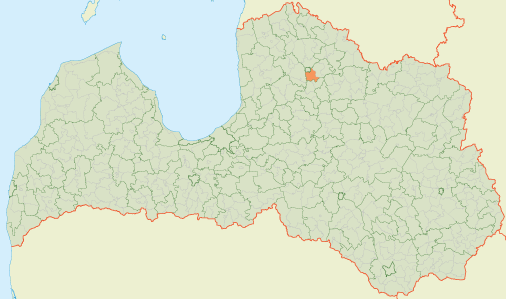
- 57°29′03″N 25°28′30″E
- Country: Latvia

Area
  - Total: 87.83 km^{2} (33.91 sq mi)
  - Land: 85.25 km^{2} (32.92 sq mi)
  - Water: 2.58 km^{2} (1.00 sq mi)

Population (1 January 2026)
  - Total: 1,394
  - Density: 16.35/km^{2} (42.35/sq mi)

Kauguri Parish (Latvian: Kauguru pagasts) is an administrative unit of Valmiera Municipality in the Vidzeme region of Latvia.

== Towns, villages and settlements of Kauguri parish ==
- Mūrmuiža
