= Latvian National Museum of Art =

Museum in Riga, Latvia

- Latvijas Nacionālais mākslas muzejs

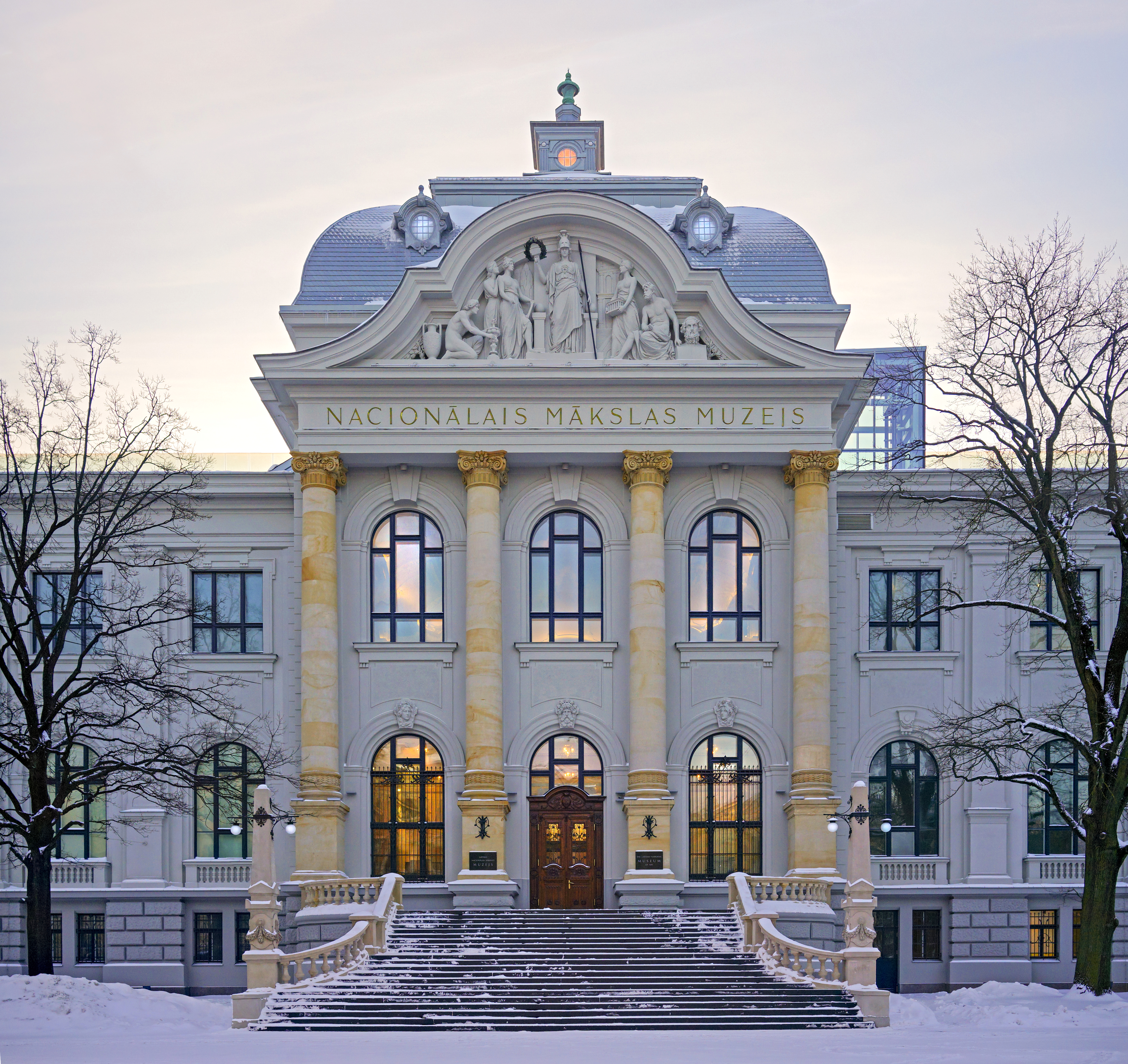
- Main entrance of the museum
- Interactive fullscreen map
- Former name: State Museum of Art
- Established: 1869
- Location: 1 Jaņa Rozentāla laukums, Riga, Latvia
- Coordinates: 56.955775°N 24.113123°E
- Type: Art museum
- Director: Iveta Derkusova
- Architect: Wilhelm Neumann
- Website: lnmm.gov.lv

The Latvian National Museum of Art (Latvian: Latvijas Nacionālais mākslas muzejs; LNMA) is an art museum in Riga, Latvia. The museum comprises six sites and holds more than 100,000 works of art and objects of cultural significance.

The museum traces its origins to the Riga City Art Gallery, which opened to the public in 1869. Its main building at 1 Jaņa Rozentāla laukums holds Latvian painting, graphic art and sculpture from the 18th century to the middle of the 20th century.

== History ==
The museum's collection history reaches back to the Himsel Museum, founded in 1773, where an art collection was separated into its own cabinet in 1816. In 1866 the Riga City Council acquired the paintings of collector Domenico de Robiani. They formed the basis of the Riga City Art Gallery, which opened to the public in 1869. The Riga Society for the Promotion of Art was founded in 1870.

After Latvia became independent in 1918, the museum turned its attention to national art. Under Vilhelms Purvītis in the 1920s and 1930s, it systematically developed its collection of Latvian visual art. Following the Soviet occupation in 1940, the museum system was reorganized into separate institutions for Latvian and Russian art and for foreign art. In 2000 the Ministry of Culture merged the Arsenāls Museum of Art into the State Museum of Art. The combined institution adopted the name Latvian National Museum of Art in September 2005.

The main building of the museum was built between 1903 and 1905 and is a notable historicist-style structure. The building was designed by the Baltic German architect Wilhelm Neumann, who was also the museum's first director from 1905 to 1919. It is one of the last eclectic-style buildings constructed in Riga, designed in Baroque forms and finished with plaster, sandstone, and granite.

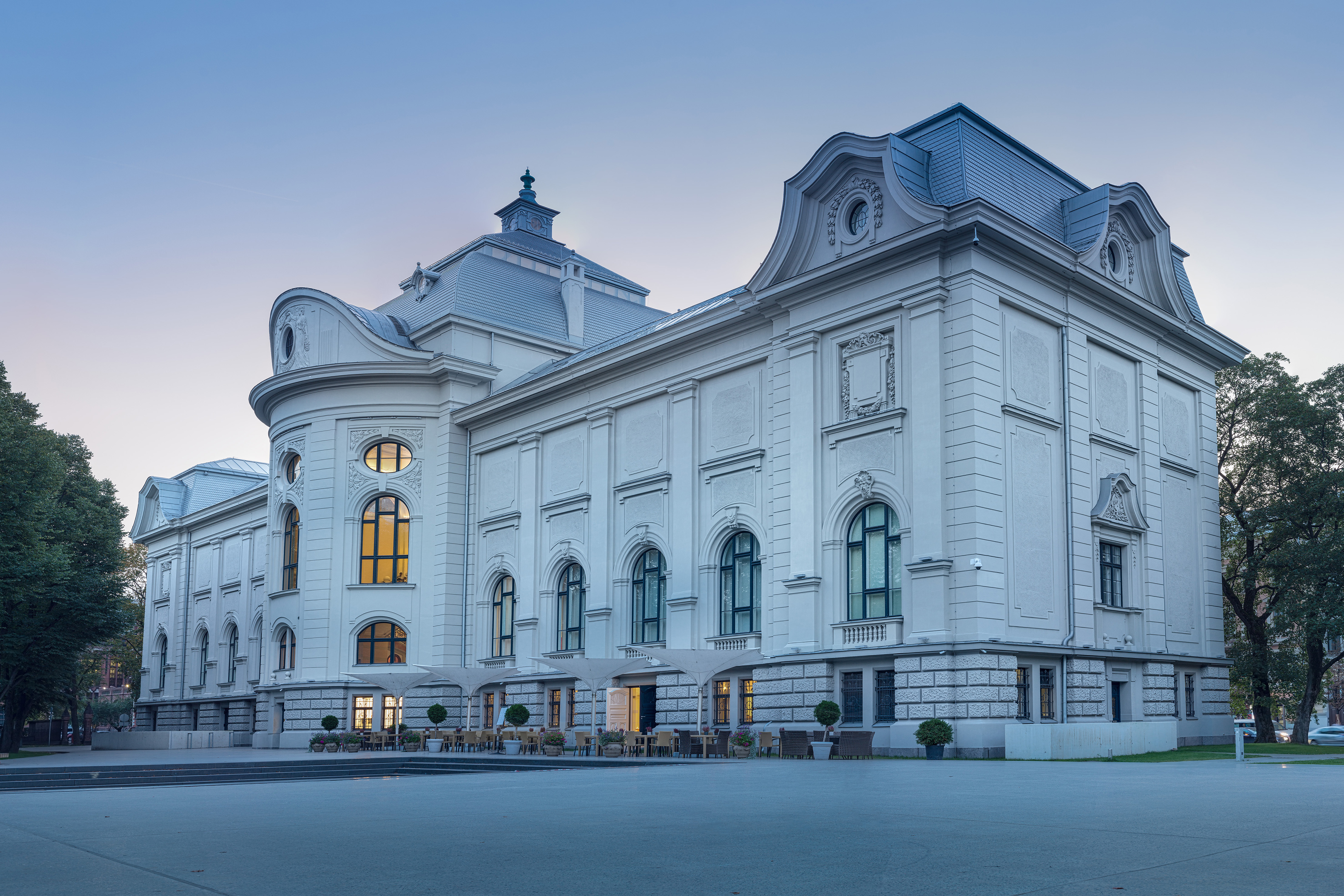
Building of the Latvian National Museum of Art

The sculptural groups were created by August Volz, while the paintings were done by Vilhelms Purvītis and G. Rozens. The interior decoration features Art Nouveau elements. Ludwig Kerkovius, who served as the Mayor of Riga from 1890 to 1901, played a significant role in the museum's construction.

The museum is next to the Art Academy of Latvia. It was the first purpose-built museum building in the Baltic states.

In 2010 the Riga City Council approved the reconstruction and expansion of the main building. The project restored the historic structure and added a two-level underground block containing exhibition halls, collection storage, conservation rooms and technical spaces. The museum reopened on 4 May 2016 with a new permanent display of Latvian art. The reconstruction received the Grand Prize of the 2016 Latvian Architecture Award.

In 2025, the Golden Globe and Academy Award for the 2024 animated film Flow were placed on display at the museum.

== Sites and collections ==
The Latvian National Museum of Art comprises six sites in Riga:

- the main building of the Latvian National Museum of Art at 1 Jaņa Rozentāla laukums;
- Art Museum RIGA BOURSE;
- the Museum of Decorative Arts and Design;
- the Romans Suta and Aleksandra Beļcova Museum;
- Art Museum ARSENĀLS;
- the Museum Storage Facility and Forest of Sculptures.

The main building holds Latvian painting, graphic art and sculpture from the 18th century to the middle of the 20th century, including memorial collections devoted to Jāzeps Grosvalds, Teodors Zaļkalns and Gustavs Šķilters. Its painting collection for this period contains more than 3,350 works by more than 300 artists. Major holdings include works by Jūlijs Feders, Vilhelms Purvītis, Janis Rozentāls and Johann Walter.

== Gallery ==
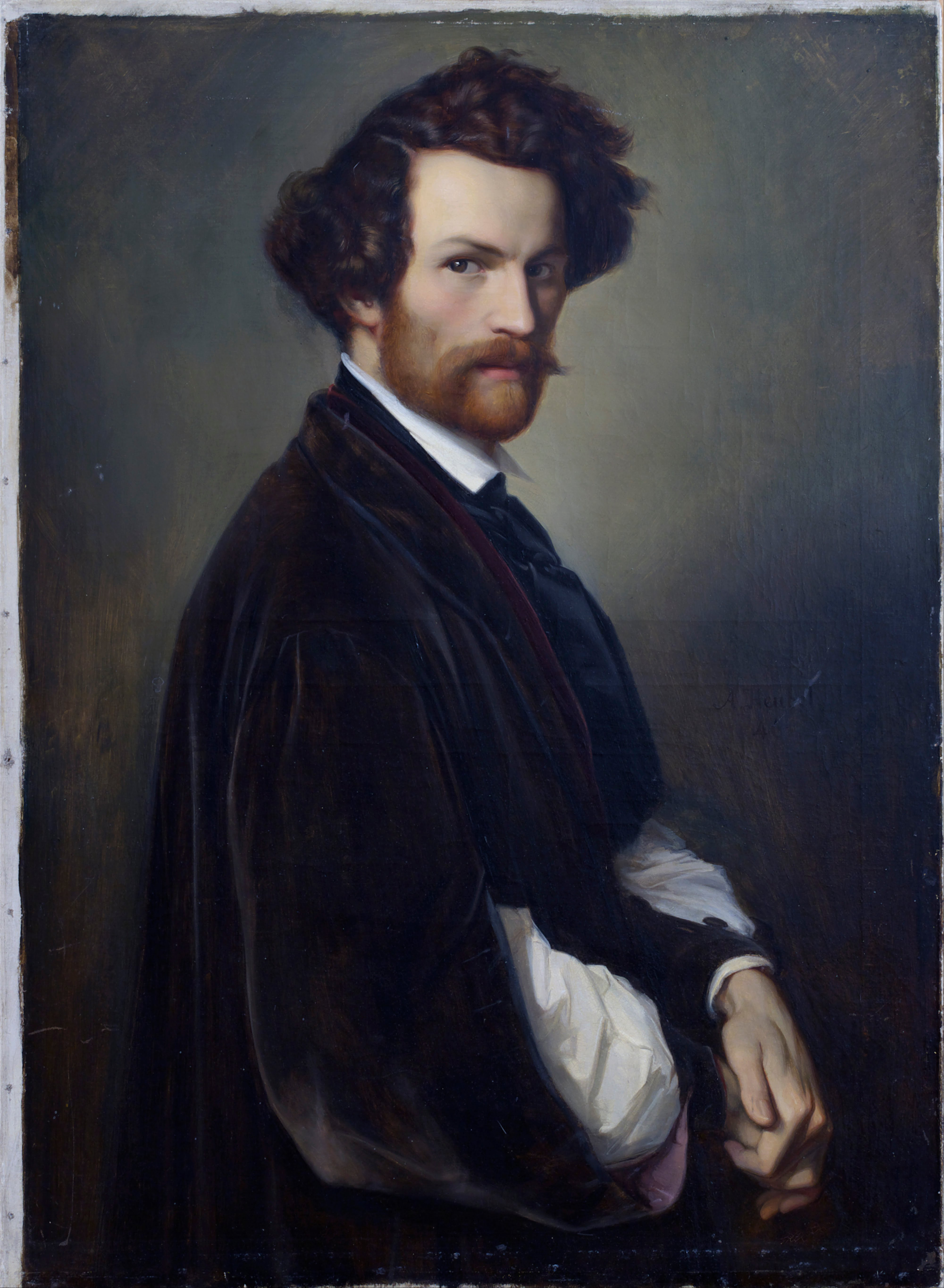
Alexander Heubel, Self-portrait, 1846

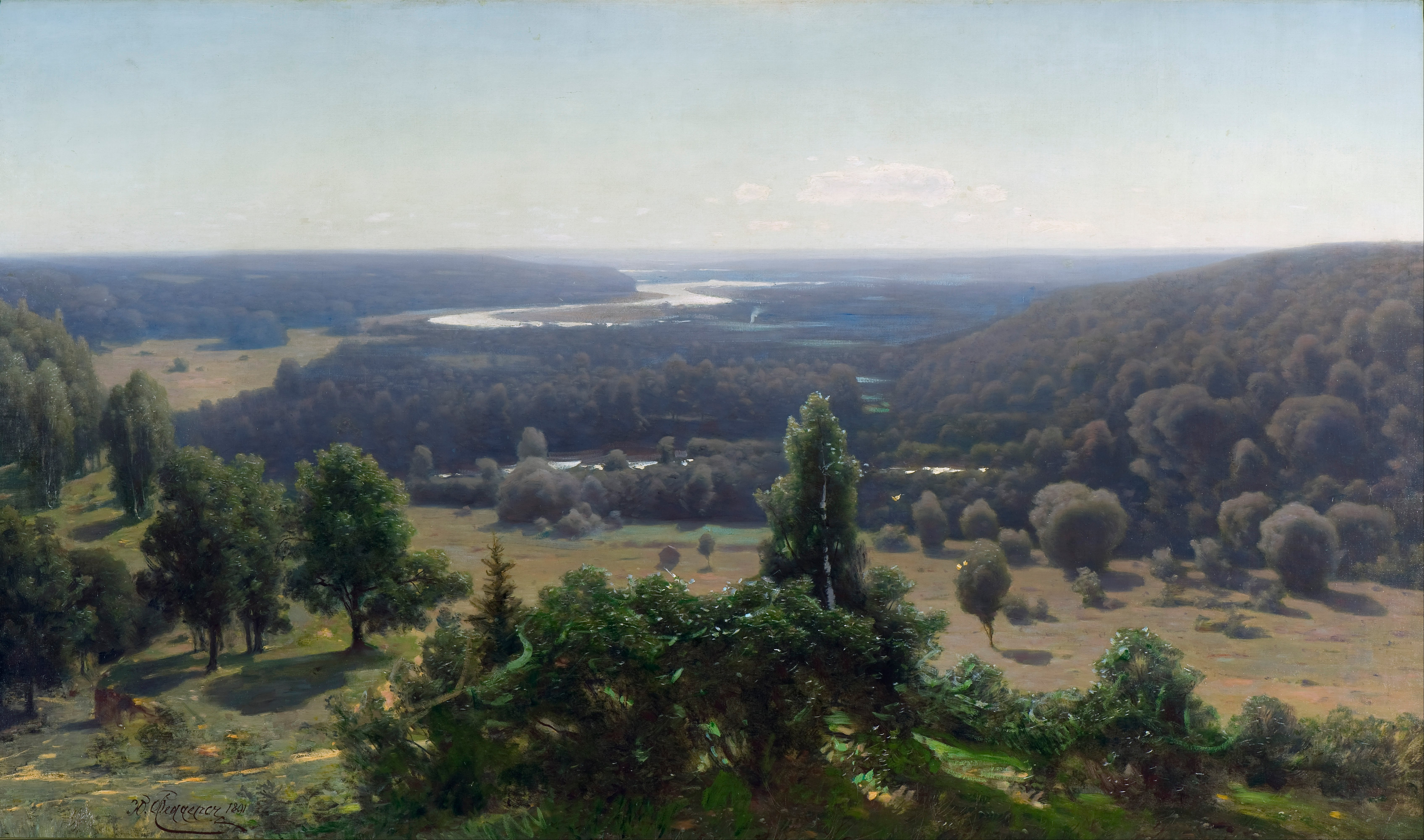
Jūlijs Feders, The Gauja Valley, 1891

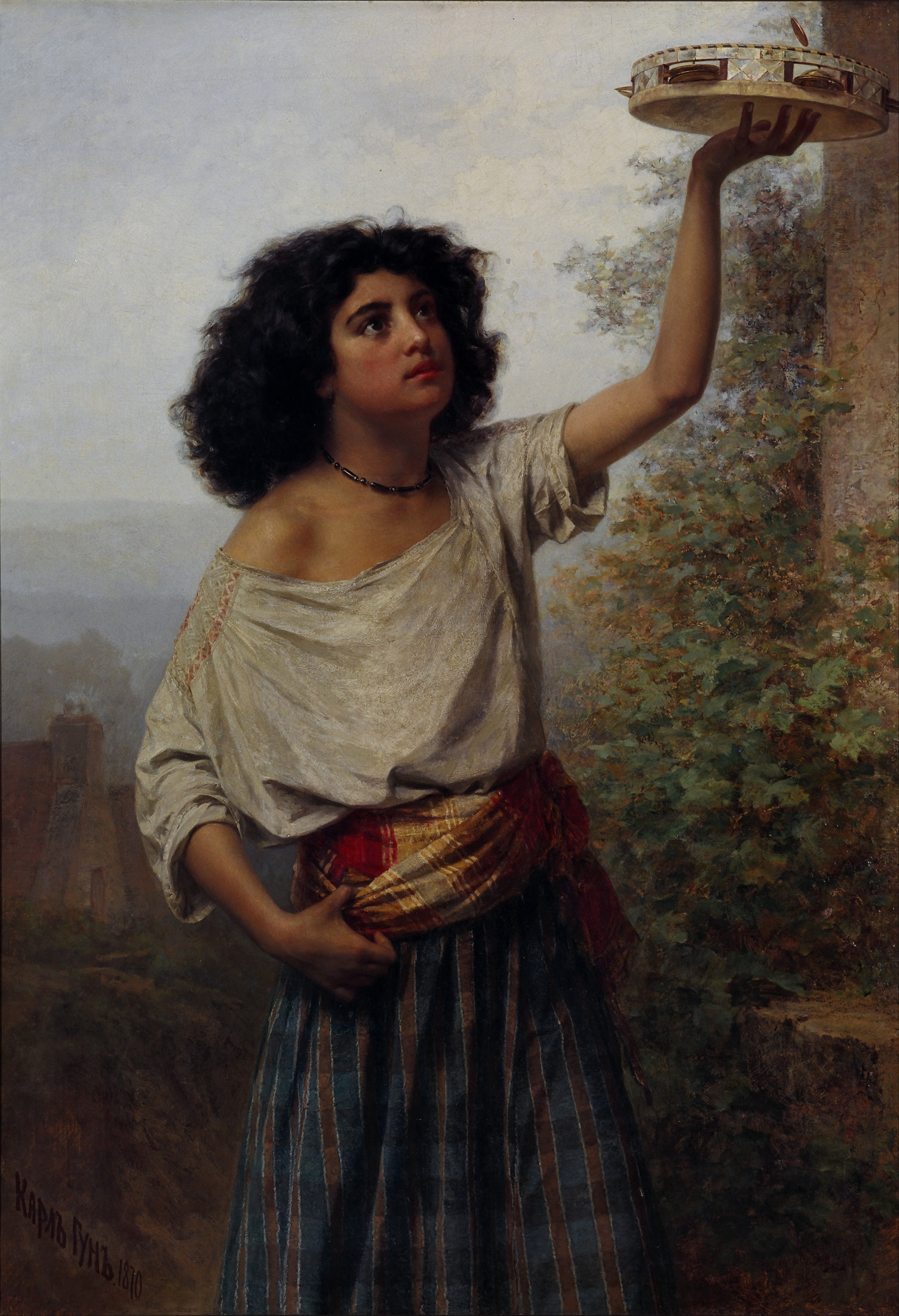
Kārlis Hūns, Young Gypsy Woman, 1870

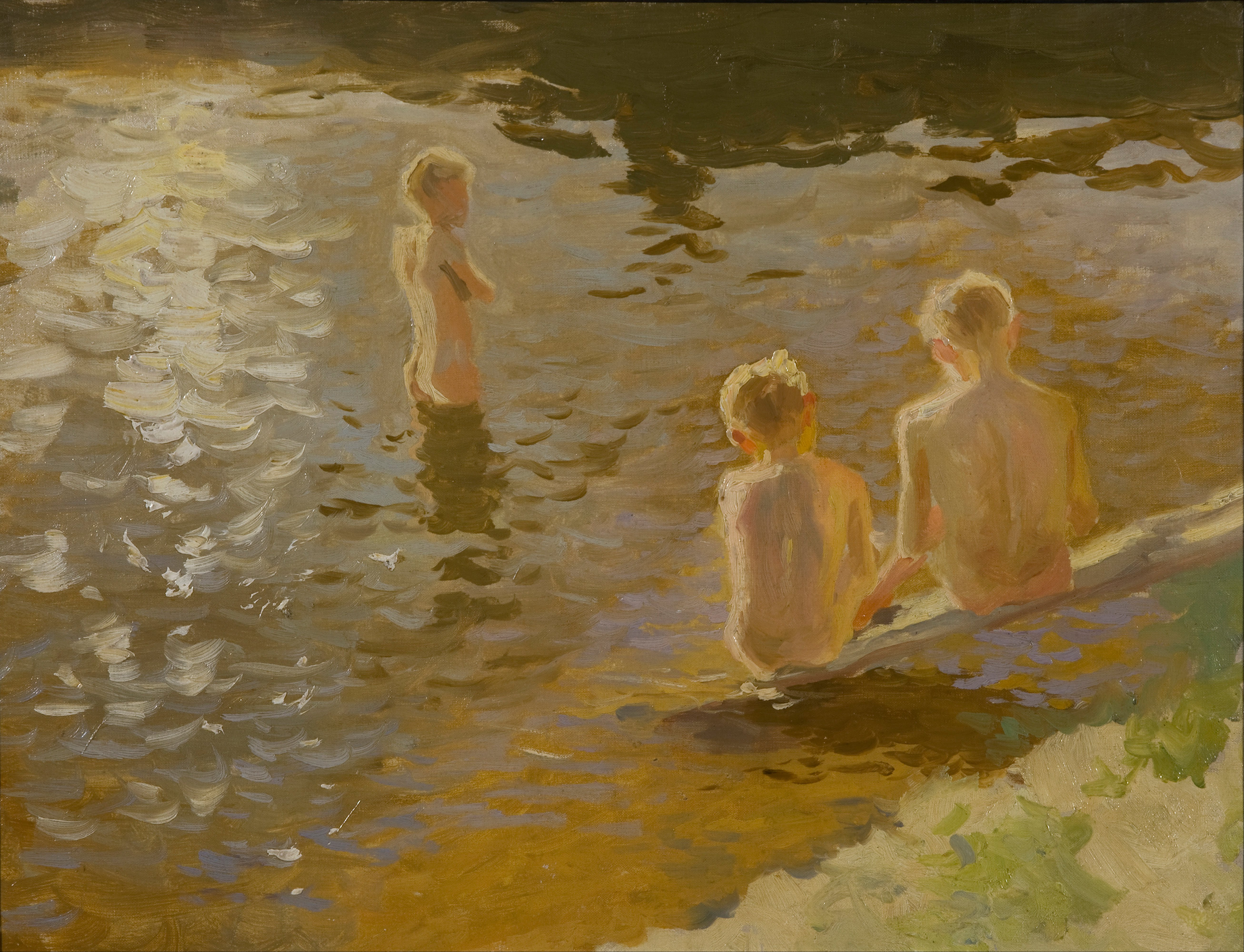
Johann Walter-Kurau, Bathing Boys, 1900

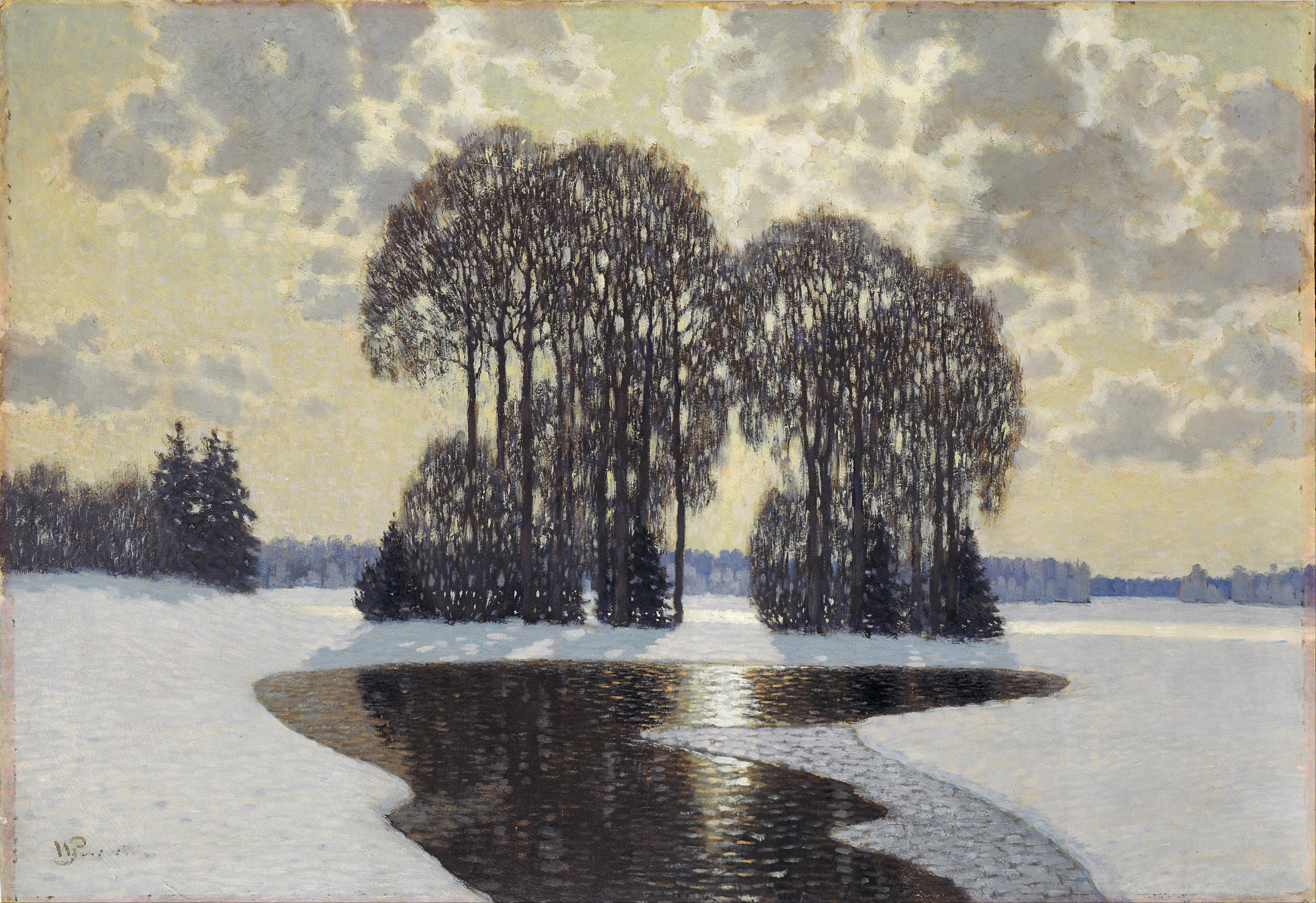
Vilhelms Purvītis, Winter, 1910

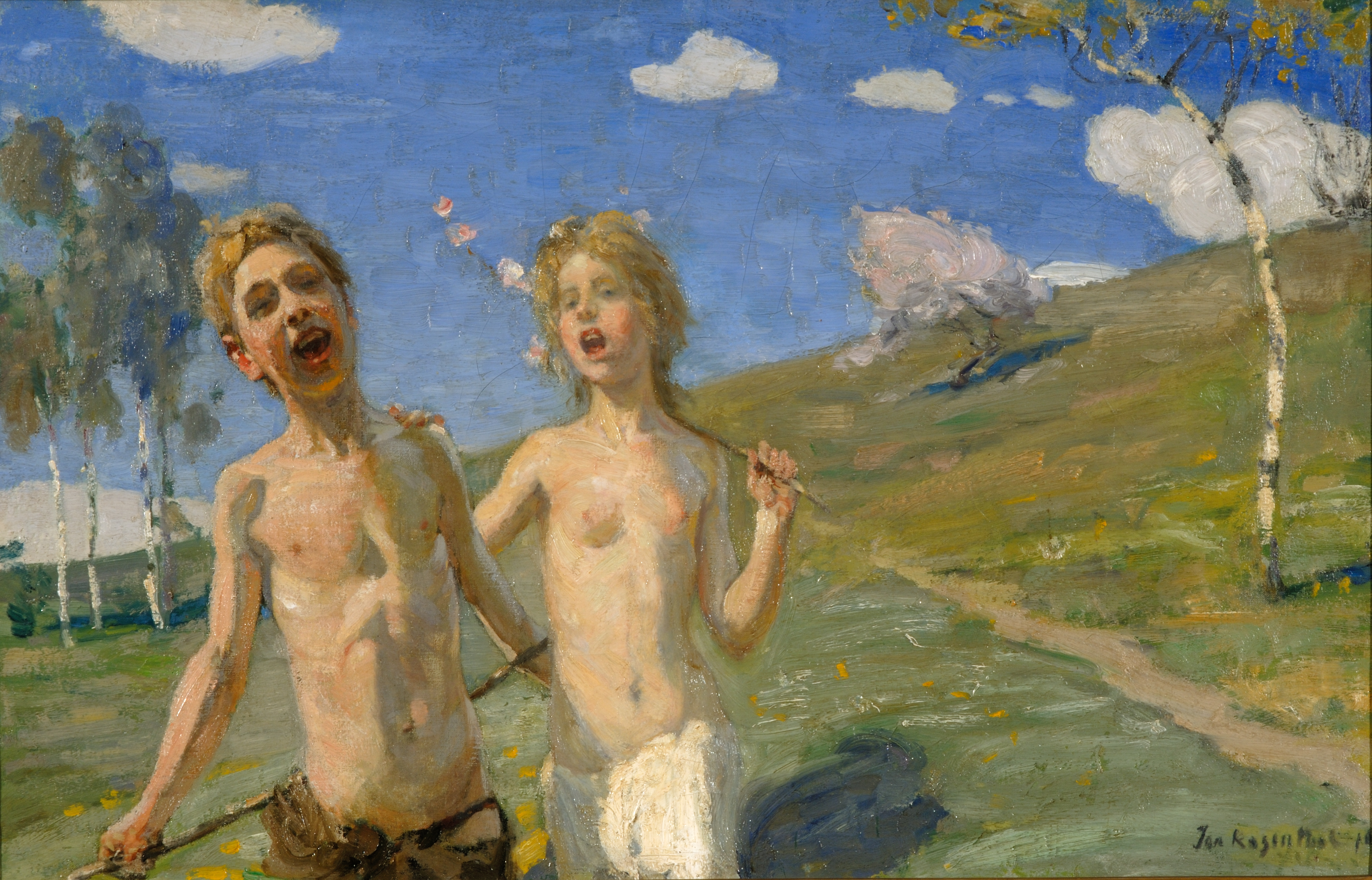
Janis Rozentāls, Jubilant children, 1913

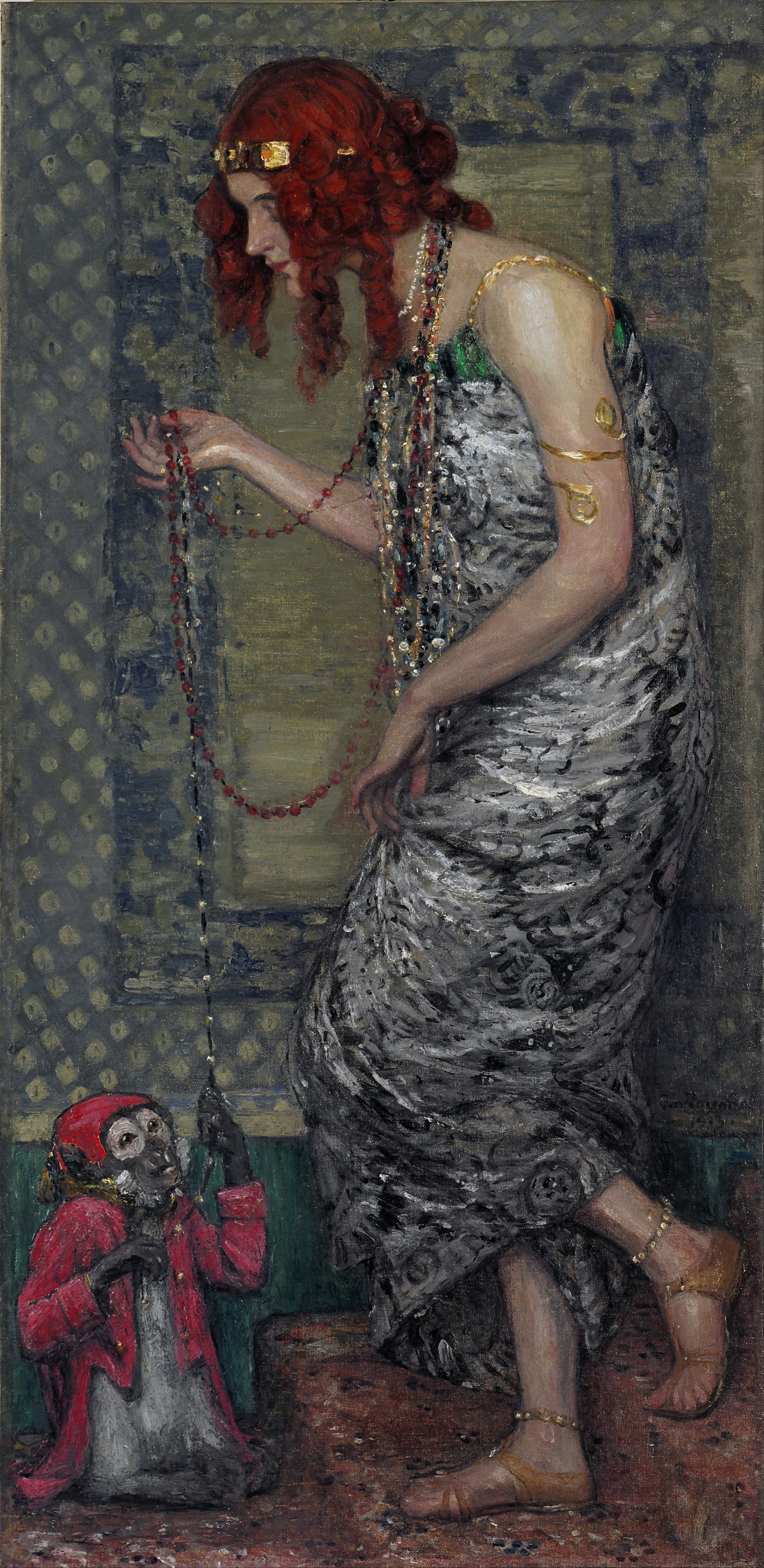
Janis Rozentāls, Princess with a Monkey, 1913

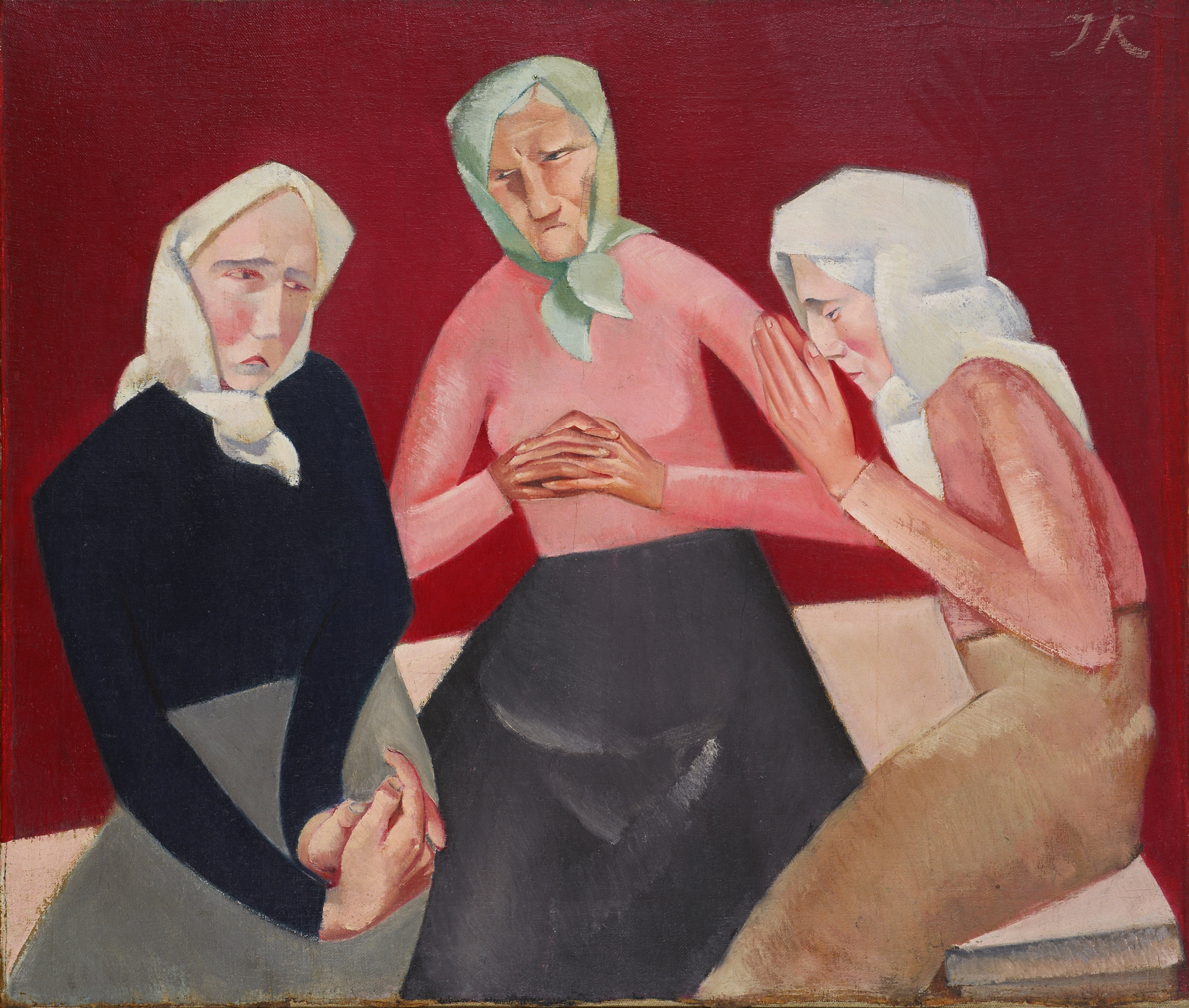
Jēkabs Kazaks, Three old women, 1916

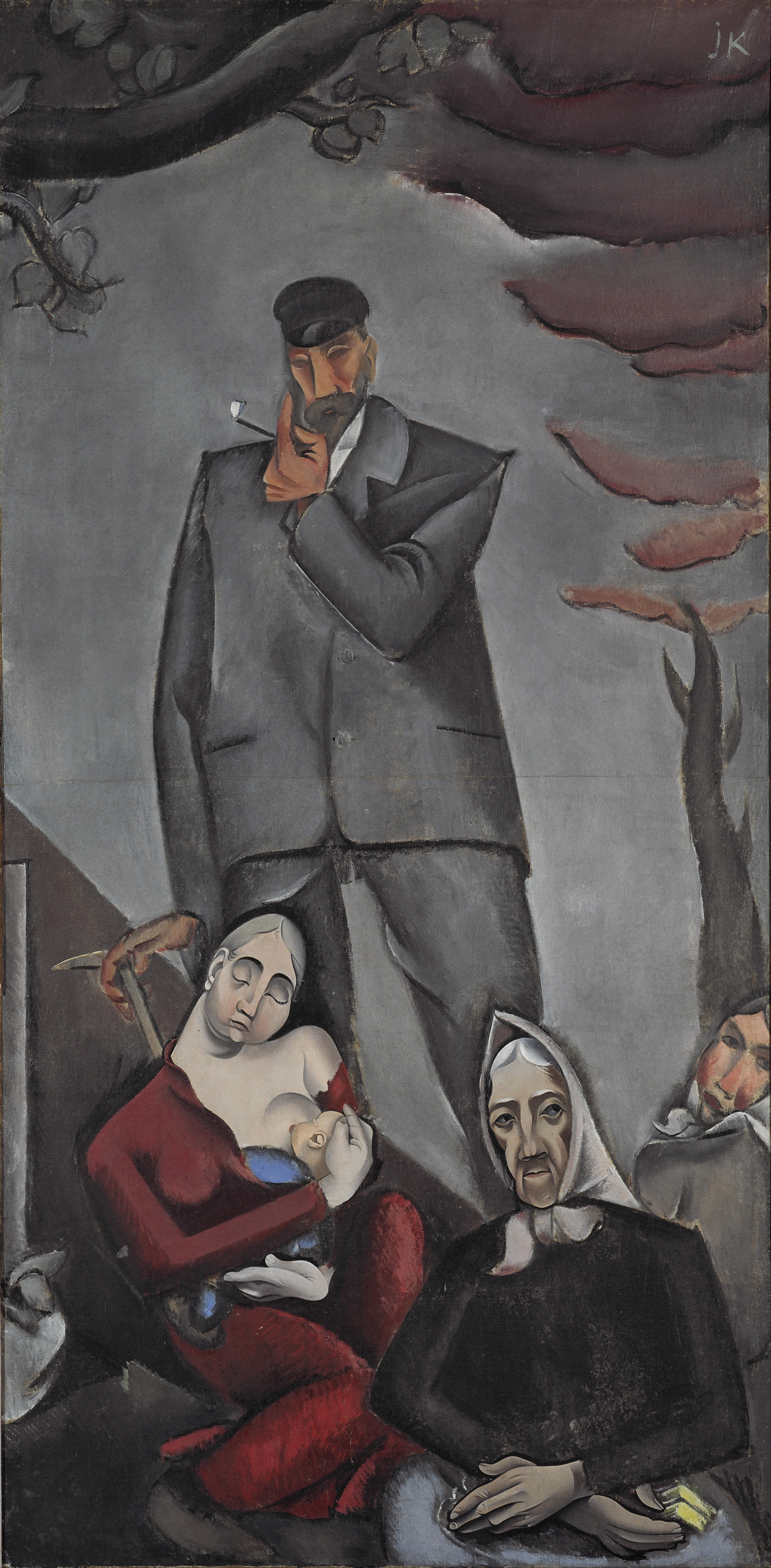
Jēkabs Kazaks, Refugees, 1917

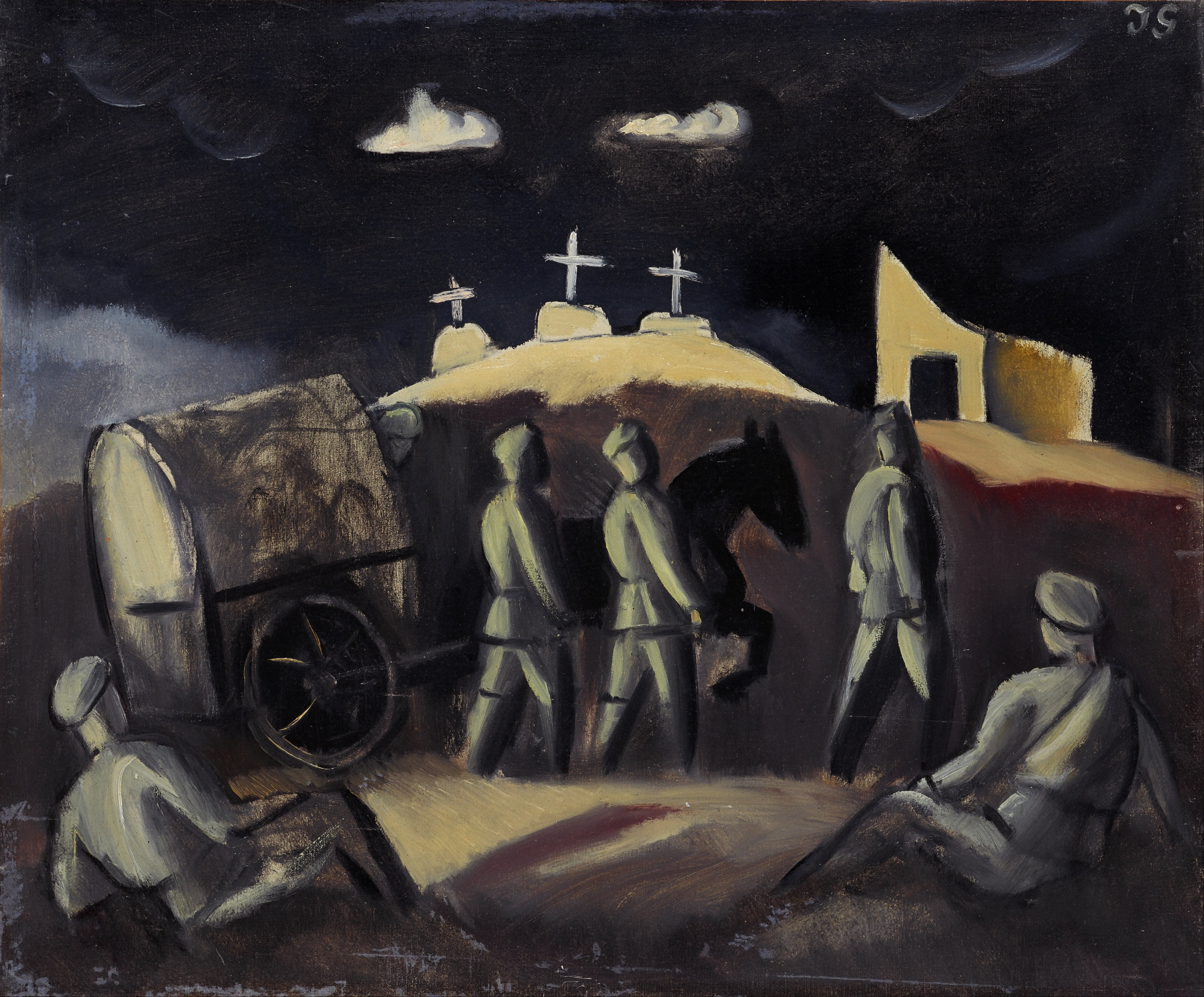
Jāzeps Grosvalds, Three Crosses, 1917

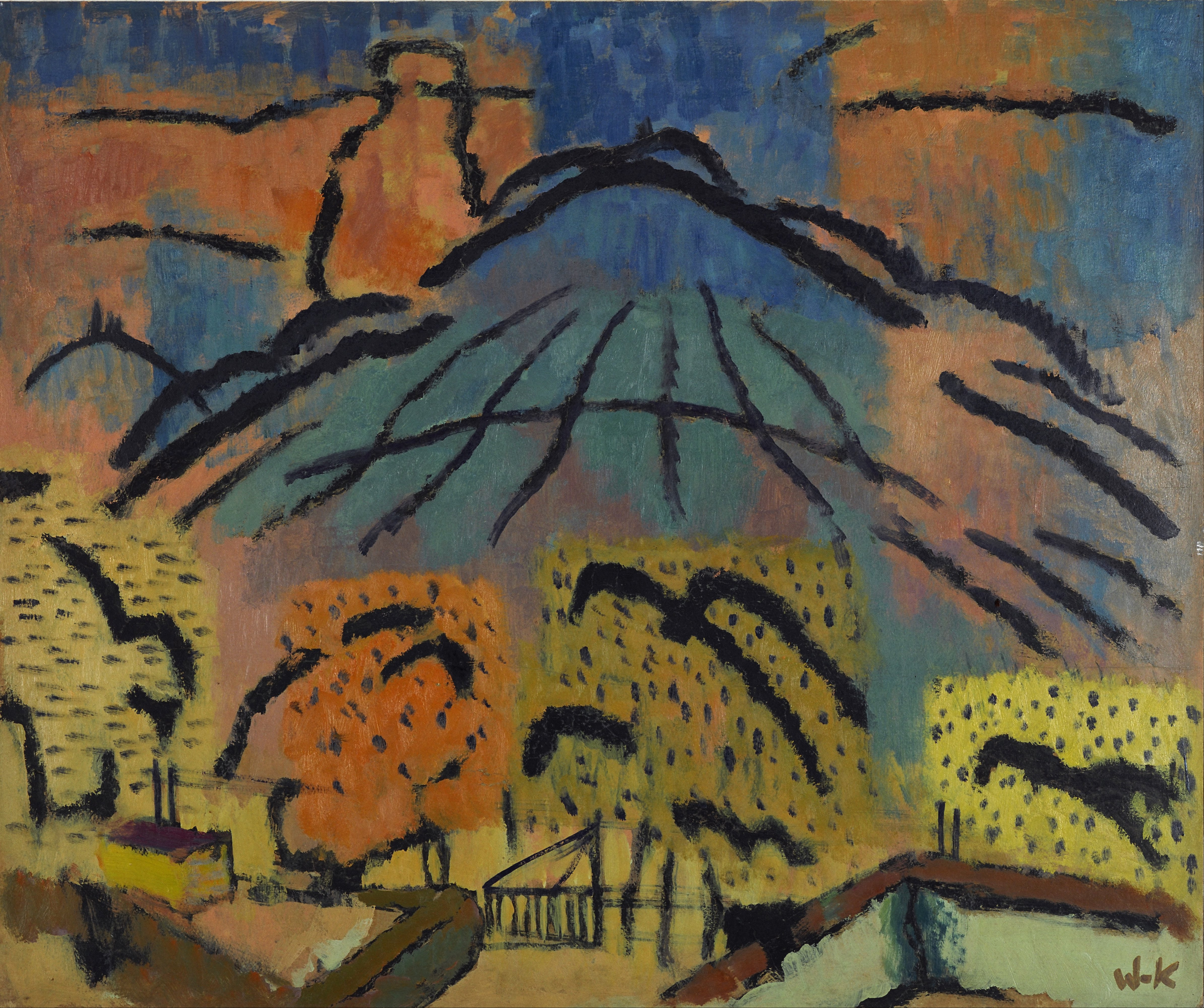
Johann Walter-Kurau, Mountain near Metzinger, 1925

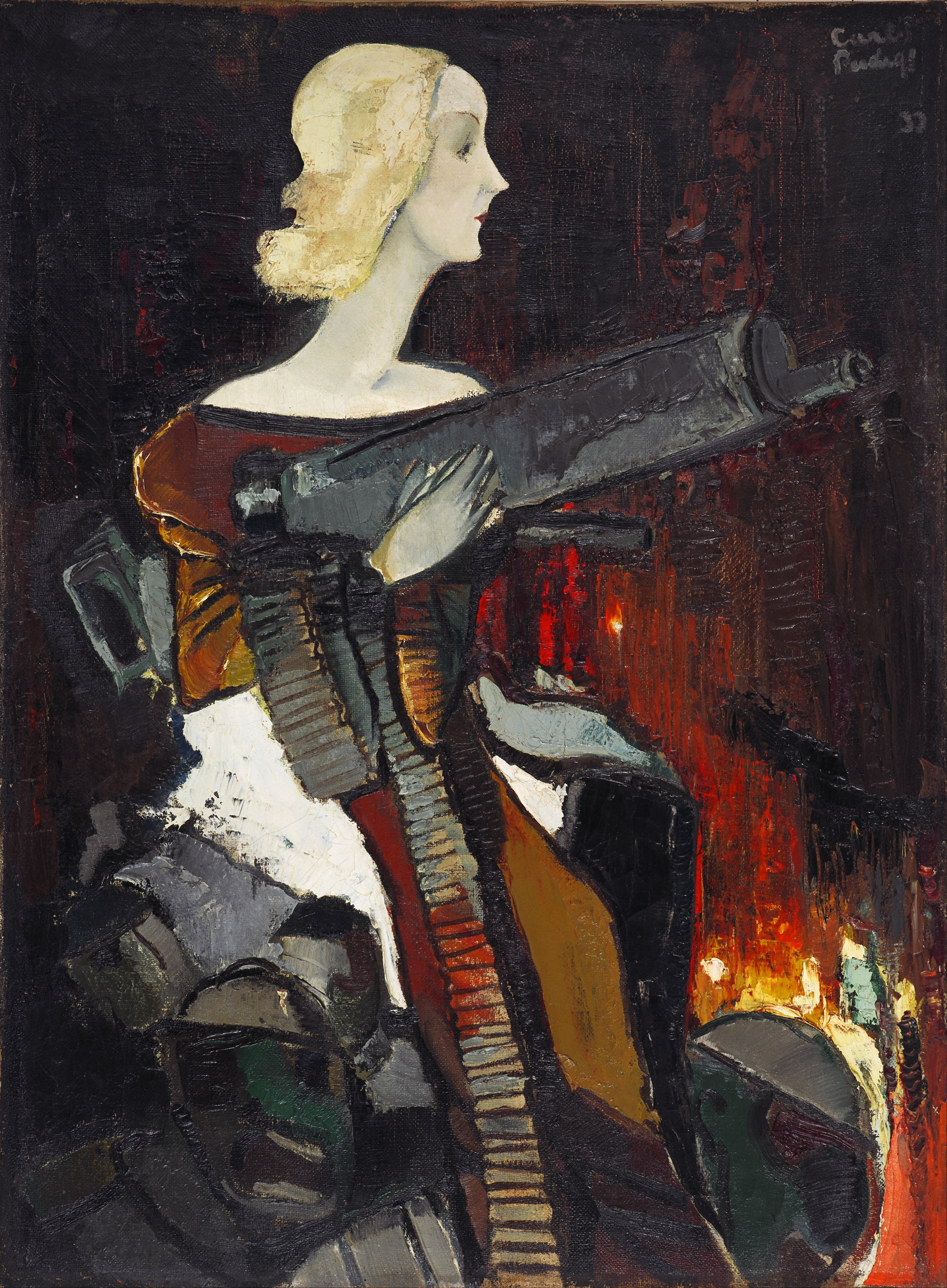
Kārlis Padegs, Madonna with a Machine Gun, 1932

== See also ==
- Girl in a Folk Costume by Jānis Tīdemanis
- Man Entering a Room by Niklāvs Strunke
- The White and the Black by Aleksandra Beļcova
- Flow (2024 film)
