= Girl in a Folk Costume =

Painting by Jānis Tīdemanis

- Meitene tautas tērpā (Latvian)
- Artist: Jānis Tīdemanis
- Year: 1930
- Medium: oil on plywood
- Dimensions: 59 cm × 48 cm (23 in × 19 in)
- Location: Latvian National Museum of Art; Riga

Girl in a Folk Costume (Latvian: Meitene tautas tērpā) is a painting by the Latvian painter Jānis Tīdemanis from 1930.

== Description ==
The painting is oil on plywood, and has dimensions 59 x 48 centimeters. The painting belongs to the Latvian National Museum of Art in Riga.

== Analysis ==
The picture depicts a young girl with plaits in a stylized folk costume with bright color on a dark background. The artist uses thick brushstrokes, and large areas of color.
