= Refugees (Kazaks) =

1917 painting by Jēkabs Kazaks

- Bēgļi (Latvian), Бежанци (Bulgarian)
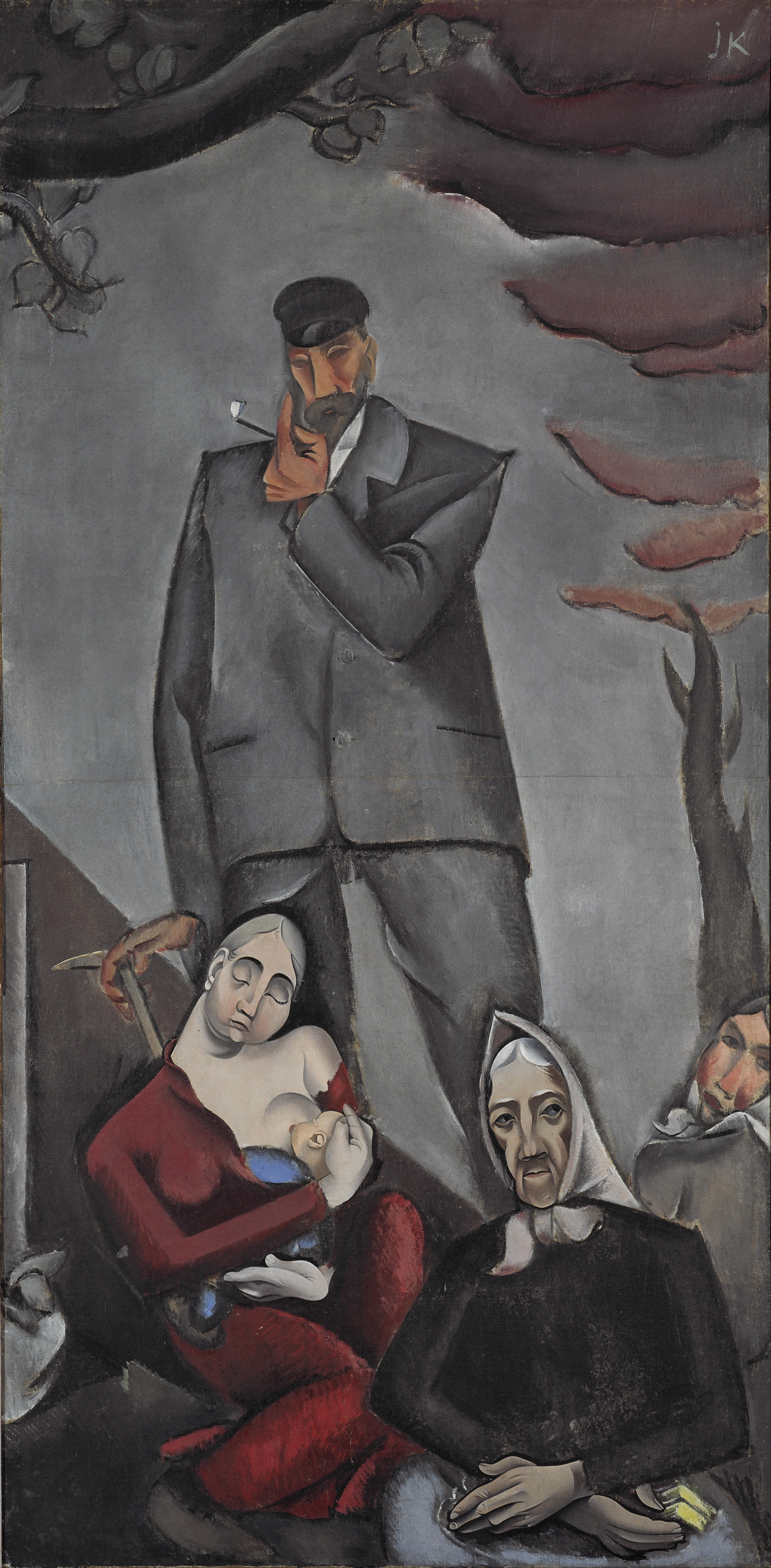
- Artist: Jēkabs Kazaks
- Year: 1917
- Medium: oil on canvas
- Dimensions: 21.05 cm × 10.7 cm (8.29 in × 4.2 in)
- Location: Latvian National Museum of Art; Riga

Refugees (Latvian: Bēgļi) is a painting by Latvian artist Jēkabs Kazaks from 1917.

== Description ==
Painted with oil on canvas, it has dimensions of 210.5 x 107 mm. The picture is part of the collection of the Latvian National Museum of Art in Riga.

== Analysis ==
The picture captures the Latvian national tragedy of dislocation from Kurzeme and Zemgale after start of World War I.

It reveals harsh story of a peasant family leaving home during the war. The old man is depicted in rampant growth, like a vertical rock. His mighty figure symbolizes strength. The image of the older woman exudes the wisdom and strength of the national spirit. The young woman with the infant symbolizes the endless cycle of life. Refugees experience inner anger and anguish, which does not allow them to succumb to despair. These people show their spiritual and physical vigor. The hope of returning to their homeland fills their hearts. This monumental painting is considered one of the highest peaks of Latvian classic modernism.
