= Anatoly Kuznetsov (artist) =

Belarusian painter

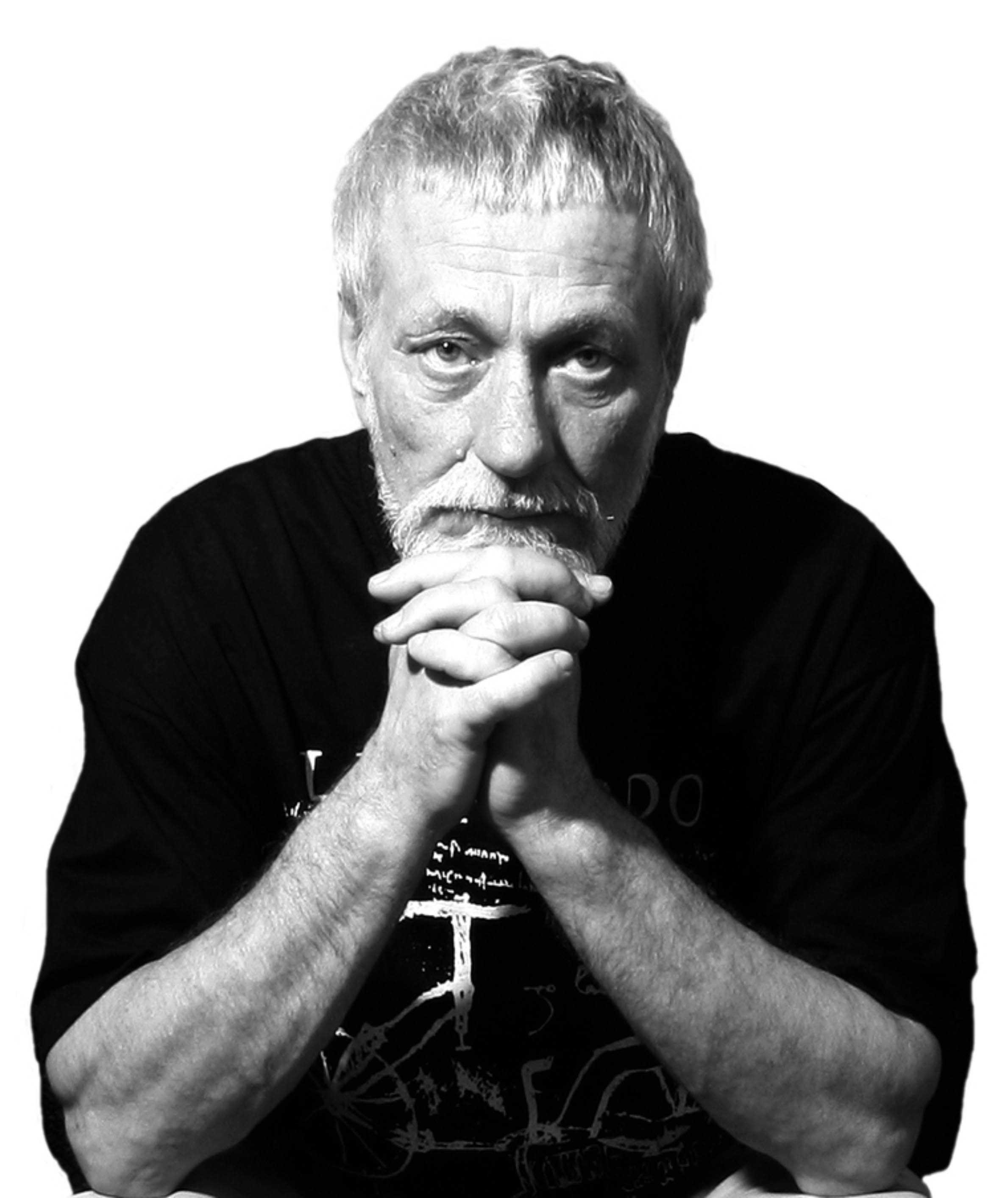
- Born: 29 April 1947 (age 79); Ust-Kamchatsk, Khabarovsk Krai, Russian SFSR, Soviet Union
- Education: Belarusian State Academy of Arts (1976)
- Known for: Painting, Non-figurative art, Nemiga-17
- Movement: Non-figurative art, Abstract expressionism, Nemiga-17
- Awards: Francysk Skaryna Medal (2013); Special Prize of the President of Belarus (2016); Honored Artist of the Republic of Belarus (2019)
- Website: ourdynasty.art/anatoly-kuznetsov

Anatoly Vasilyevich Kuznetsov (Russian: Анато́лий Васи́льевич Кузнецо́в; 29 April 1947) is a prominent Belarusian painter and a central figure in contemporary non-figurative painting. He has been an active participant in the national and international art scene since the late 1970s and is best known as a key member of the influential creative association "Nemiga-17". His work explores philosophical, musical, and poetic themes through structured compositions of color, light, and rhythm. Married to Irina Kuznetsova. Daughter – Olga Kuznetsova. A part of family of 5 generations of artists – ourdynasty.art.

== Early life and education ==
Anatoly Kuznetsov was born in 1947 in Ust-Kamchatsk, Khabarovsk Krai, Russian Far East. In 1976, he graduated from the Belarusian State Academy of Arts (then the Belarusian Theater and Art Institute), specializing in easel painting. His instructors included A. Baranovsky, Kh. Livshits, V. Tyurin, M. Danzig, P. Krokholev, and V. Vorobyov.

== Career and artistic development ==
In 1979, Kuznetsov co-founded the creative group "BUKUB" with N. Bushchik and M. Barzdika. Since 1983, he has been a member of the Belarusian Union of Artists. In 1988, he became a founding participant of the avant-garde collective "Nemiga-17", which played a significant role in shaping post-Soviet Belarusian art.

From 1985, Kuznetsov developed a distinctive color-plastic style, emphasizing chromatic harmony and structural composition. By 1994, he transitioned fully into non-figurative painting, using rhythm, hue, and luminosity as primary tools for expression. His practice centers on form as both an expressive and constructive element, often evoking musical cadences and metaphysical contemplation.

He has also been a member of the International Artists' Union "Sunny Square" since 2000 and was elected a member of the New European Cultural Parliament in 2003, attending its second session in Graz, Austria.

== Exhibitions ==
=== Solo exhibitions ===
Anatoly Kuznetsov has held solo exhibitions across Europe and Asia, including:

- 1999 – Gallery "Ginza Caracan". Tokyo, Japan
- 2000 – Central House of Artists. Moscow, Russia
- 2001 – "Archaika". Museum of Contemporary Art. Minsk, Belarus
- 2004 – Ministry of Foreign Affairs of Belarus Exhibition Hall. Minsk, Belarus
- 2006 – Gallery "Glas Ost". Vienna, Austria
- 2007 – "Coloristic Spaces". New Manege. Moscow, Russia
- 2010 – "Bez predmeta" ("Without Object"). Museum of Modern Visual Art. Rostov-on-Don, Russia
- 2012 – Jubilee exhibition "Put" ("The Path") at the Republican Art Gallery. Minsk, Belarus
- 2013 – Ministry of Foreign Affairs of Belarus Exhibition Hall. Minsk, Belarus
- 2014 – "Coloristic Spaces" during the International Festival of Contemporary Dance, Vitebsk, Belarus
- 2015 – "Light. Color. Form". Yelagin Palace. Saint Petersburg, Russia
- 2016 – "Dolina Faraonov" ("Valley of the Pharaohs"). Dom Kartin. Minsk, Belarus
- 2017 – Jubilee exhibition "O zemle i nebe" ("Of Earth and Sky") at the National Art Museum of Belarus, Minsk
- 2018 – "Protuberantsy" ("Prominences") within the framework of Art-Minsk Art-House Gallery. Minsk, Belarus
- 2021 – "Reflection of Reality". Gallery D.K. Minsk, Belarus
- 2022 – "Between Black and White". Republican Art Gallery. Minsk, Belarus

=== Group and international exhibitions ===
Kuznetsov has participated annually in republican exhibitions since 1977 and has exhibited internationally, including:

- 1978 – All-Union Youth Exhibition. Central House of Artists (TsDKh). Moscow, Russia
- 1989 – Laureate. All-Union Painting Exhibition-Contest. Central House of Artists (TsDKh). Moscow, Russia
- 1991 – "Nemiga-17" exhibition at Salon des Arts de Marcel Pouvrier. Fontainebleau, France
- 1991 – Exhibition of Belarusian Artists. Ripatransone, Italy
- 1994 – First International Marc Chagall Plein Air. Vitebsk, Belarus
- 1995 – Embassy of Belarus. Brussels; Galerie Kovalenko. Eindhoven, Netherlands
- 1997 – Salon Art. New York, USA
- 2002 – Exhibition of Belarusian Artists. Salle Cardin, Paris, France
- 2002 – "Nemiga-17" exhibition at the State Tretyakov Gallery. Moscow, Russia
- 2003 – 9th International Biennale. Cairo, Egypt
- 2003 – "Art of Nations". 10th Anniversary of the CIS, Central House of Artists (TsDKh). Moscow, Russia
- 2005 – Belarusian Art Exhibition. Geneva, Switzerland
- 2007 – "Master and Students". Moscow House of Scientists. Moscow, Russia
- 2007 – "Music and Color". Moscow House of Nationalities. Moscow, Russia
- 2010 – "Territory of Abstraction". KollerArtHouse & Gallery Nagornaya. Moscow, Russia
- 2014 – "Litart". Vilnius, Lithuania; "From Square to Object", Minsk, Belarus
- 2015 – "Polonaise". Republican Art Gallery. Minsk, Belarus; "Privet Picasso". National Center of Contemporary Arts. Minsk, Belarus
- 2016 – "From Rembrandt to Appel"under EU cultural program "Most". Savitsky Gallery. Minsk, Belarus
- 2019–2020 – International Festival "Art-Minsk". Republican Art Gallery. Minsk, Belarus
- 2020 – Shortlisted for the National Prize of the Republic of Belarus. Republican Art Gallery. Minsk, Belarus

== Collections ==
Anatoly's works are held in major public institutions, including:

- National Art Museum of the Republic of Belarus. Minsk, Belarus (one work in permanent display)
- Museum of Contemporary Art. Minsk, Belarus
- Polotsk Art Gallery. Polotsk, Belarus
- Mogilev Art Gallery. Mogilev, Belarus
- Marc Chagall Museum. Vitebsk, Belarus
- Vashеnko Art Gallery. Gomel, Belarus
- Tretyakov Gallery. Moscow, Russia
- Yekaterinburg Museum of Fine Arts. Yekaterinburg, Russia
- Sochi Art Gallery. Sochi, Russia
- Museum of Modern Art on Dmitrovskaya (founded in 2009 based on a collection of Kuznetsov's works). Rostov-on-Don, Russia
- Arsenals Museum. Riga, Latvia
- New Brunswick Museum. New Brunswick, Canada
- Galerie Kovalenko. Eindhoven, Netherlands
- Musée d'Orsay. Orsay, France
- Pushkin Cultural Center. Luxembourg
- Gallery of Ripatransone, Italy

His works are also present in private collections across Finland, Norway, Sweden, Germany, France, Italy, the Netherlands, Taiwan, Thailand, Japan, Israel, the United States, Poland, Lithuania, Latvia, Russia, and Belarus.

== Recognition and honors ==
- 1989 – Laureate, All-Union Painting Exhibition-Contest. Moscow, Russia
- 2013 – Awarded the Francysk Skaryna Medal for contributions to the spiritual and intellectual heritage of the Belarusian people
- 2016 – Recipient of the Special Prize of the President of the Republic of Belarus for long-term artistic activity and creation of high-quality paintings
- 2019 – Honored Artist of the Republic of Belarus

== Legacy and digital presence ==
As part of a five-generation artistic dynasty that includes architect Ivan Medvedev, glass artist Irina Kuznetsova, painter Olga Kuznetsova, and her children, Matvei Igumnov and Ulyana Igumnova, Anatoly Kuznetsov's legacy continues through younger generations who engage with art in new forms.

The family's creative history is documented on ourdynasty.art, a curated digital gallery preserving over a century of artistic production. The site features content related to the family's contributions to Belarusian and international art.
