= Alexander Heubel =

Latvian painter (1813–1847)

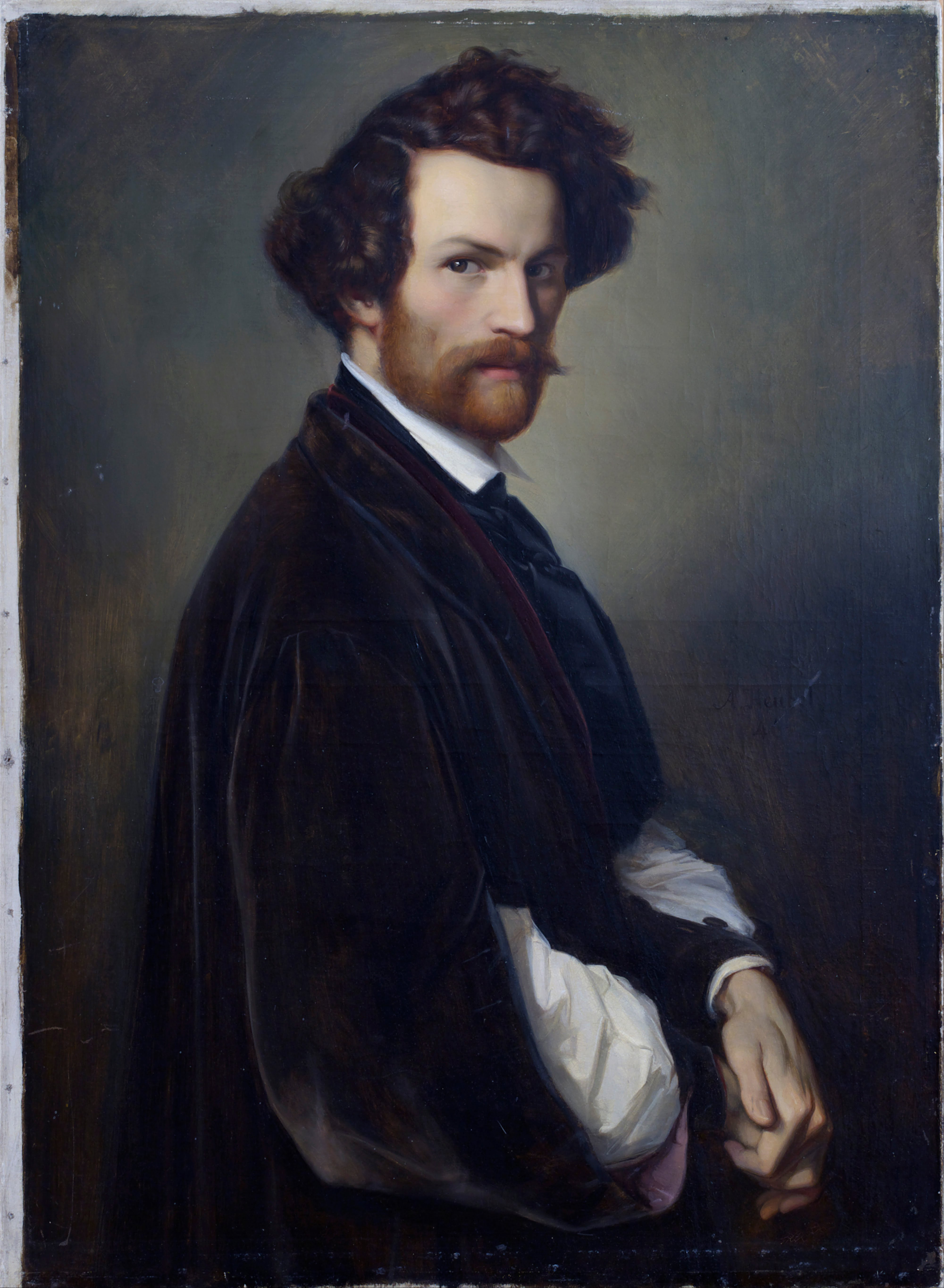
Self portrait, Latvian National Museum of Art, 1846

Alexander Heubel or Aleksandrs Heibels (9 April 1813 – 22 January 1847) was a Latvian romantic painter. His works were characterized by depictions of biblical figures and were typically highly influenced by German Romanticism.

== Biography ==
Huebel was born in Limbaži as the son of the fine art woodworker August Gotthilf Heubel (1760–1846) and his wife Juliane Marie, née Geywitz (d. 1831). He started painting at an early age, studying first for his father and later in Tartu and Riga. Heubel came to Riga in 1829 where he took lessons from the painter Georg Heinrich Büttner.

Through the patronage of the Baltic German councillor in Riga, Friedrich Wilhelm Brederlo, he was able to travel to Germany and Italy to study in Dresden, Düsseldorf and Rome. In the autumn of 1832 he moved to Dresden together with Johann Karl Bähr to enter the Dresden Academy of Fine Arts, and in 1834 he went to Düsseldorf, where he studied for Eduard Bendemann and Friedrich Wilhelm Schadow. In 1841 he went with his fellow student Ludwig Haach to Rome. He returned to Latvia, his native country, weak and sickly in 1845. He died from tuberculosis two years later, at the age of 33, in Riga.

== Influences ==
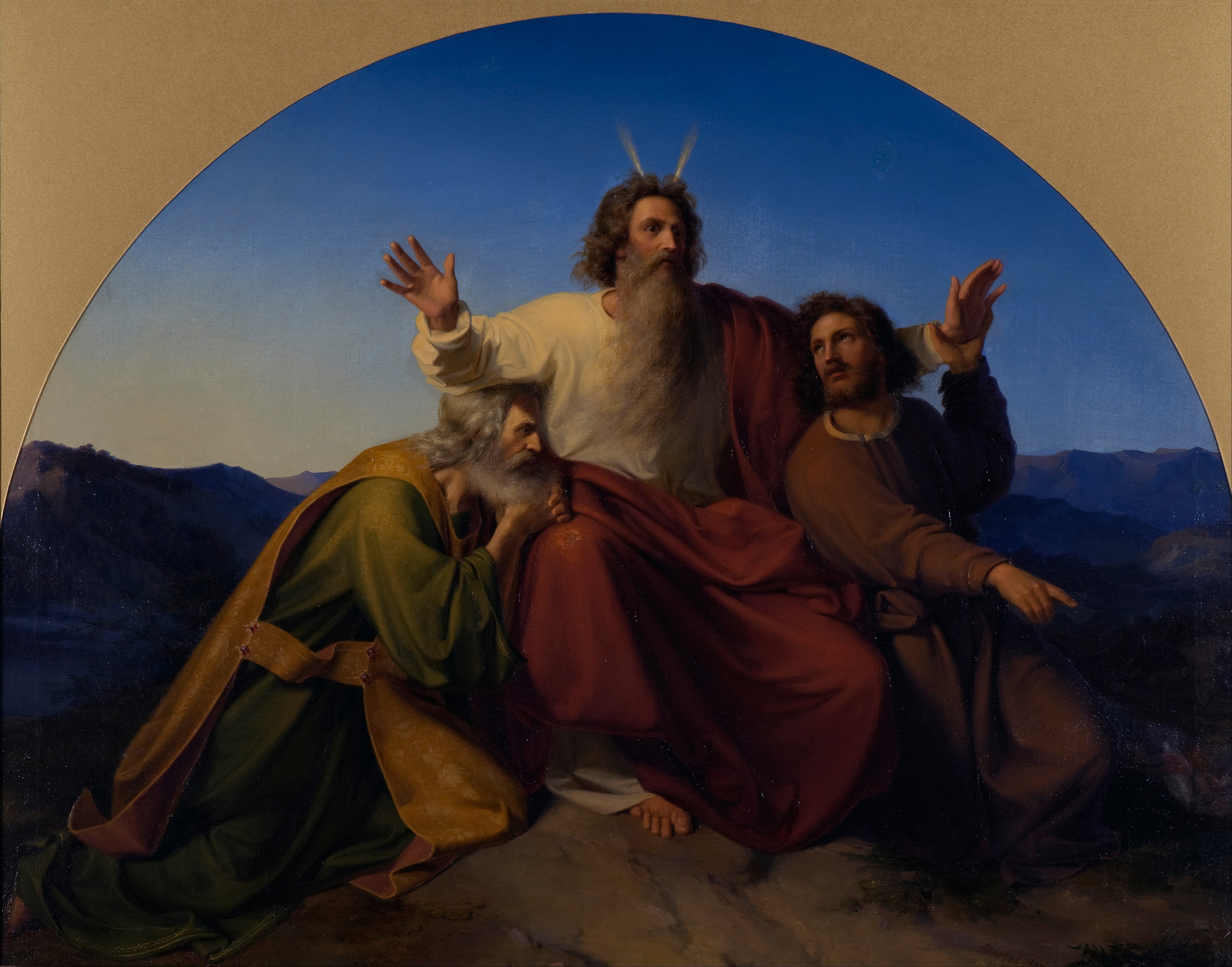
Moses, Aaron and Hur, Latvian National Museum of Art, 1837

Heubel was much influenced by the German Romanticism of the Düsseldorf school of painting. He mainly focused on religious themes and depicted various biblical scenes. Several of his works are in the collections of the Latvian National Museum of Art. His painting of the Holy Family was recovered by the museum in 2012 after having been missing for 20 years after being stolen.

== Works ==
Among his works are a scene depicting Moses, supported by Aaron and Hur at the victory over the Amalekites at the Battle of Rephidim (1837) in the collections of the Latvian National Museum of Art; a biblical depiction of Shadrach, Meshach, and Abednego being thrown into the fiery furnace (1841–44) commissioned in Rome by the Empress consort of Russia Alexandra Feodorovna and later hung at Ropsha Palace; an altarpiece at St. James's Cathedral in Riga of the Ascension of Christ (1845); a depiction of Job and his three friends, painted in Düsseldorf; a study of the head of an old man, once in the Brederlo Gallery. They also include a painting of the Holy Family in the collections of the Latvian National Museum of Art; a portrait of the painter Theobald von Oer (1844), painted in Dresden; a painting of the Flight into Egypt; a portrait of an Italian woman; a portrait of a German girl, and several self-portraits.
