= Man Entering a Room =

1927 painting by Niklāvs Strunke

- Cilvēks, kas ieiet istabā (Latvian)
- Artist: Niklāvs Strunke
- Year: 1927
- Medium: oil on canvas
- Dimensions: 92 cm × 86 cm (36 in × 34 in)
- Location: Latvian National Museum of Art; Riga

Man entering a room (Latvian: Cilvēks, kas ieiet istabā) is a Cubist painting from 1927 by Latvian painter Niklāvs Strunke.

== Description ==
The painting is oil on canvas, with dimensions 92 x 86 centimeters. The painting belongs to the Latvian National Museum of Art in Riga.

== Analysis ==
The picture depicts a man who goes through a door beside him seen a small table and a light source in a half-empty room.
