= Madonna with Machine Gun =

1932 painting by Kārlis Padegs

- Madonna ar ložmetēju (Latvian)
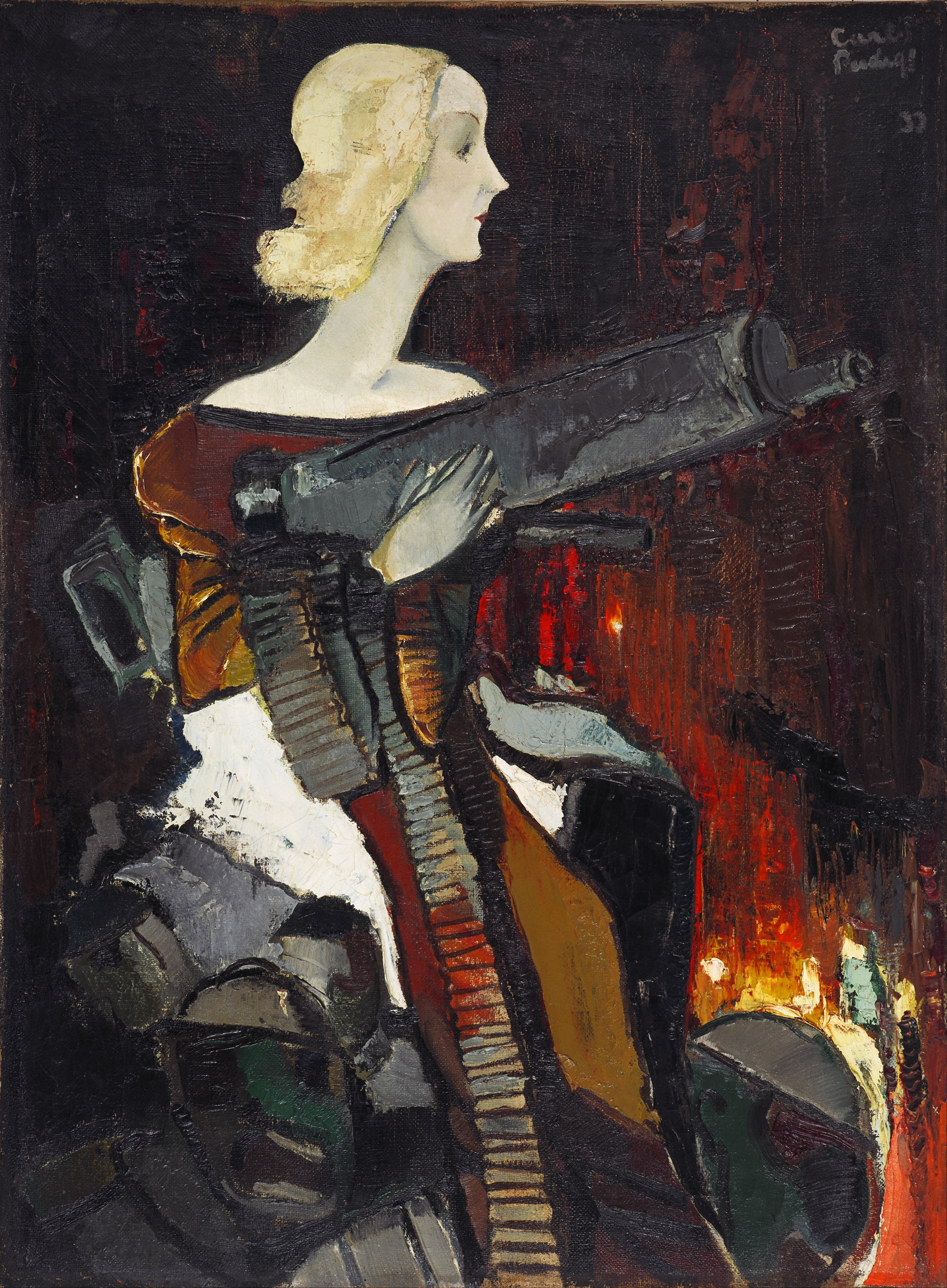
- Artist: Kārlis Padegs
- Year: 1932
- Medium: oil on canvas
- Dimensions: 134 cm × 100 cm (53 in × 39 in)
- Location: Latvian National Museum of Art; Riga

Madonna with Machine Gun (Latvian: Madonna ar ložmetēju) is an oil painting by the Latvian artist Kārlis Padegs from 1932. The painting belongs to the Latvian National Museum of Art in Riga.

== Description ==
The painting depicts a virgin woman with an innocent face nestled amongst boots and helmets. She is holding a machine gun with a long ammunition belt. The style of the painting reflects both local Baltic influences and the modern art movements of contemporary Western Europe.
