= Jēkabs Kazaks =

Latvian painter (1895–1920)

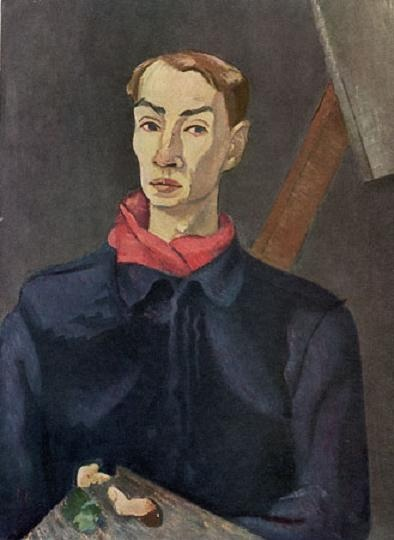
- Self-portrait, 1918
- Born: 18 February 1895; Rīga, Russian Empire (modern Latvia)
- Died: 30 November 1920 (aged 25); Rīga, Latvia
- Known for: Painting
- Movement: Modernism

Jēkabs Kazaks (18 February 1895, in Riga – 30 November 1920, in Riga) was a Latvian modernist painter.

== Biography ==
Kazaks was born in a relatively meager surroundings and had to struggle to finish his high school education. He studied at the Riga Art School between 1913 and 1915 (under Vilhelms Purvītis and Roberts Tillbergs) and the Penza Art School during World War I, (1915-1917). Like many Latvian modernists, his formal artistic training and the choice of his most compelling subjects derived from his experience as a refugee during World War I. Kazaks style contained elements of Impressionism, West European Old Masters, modern French painters and early 20th century Latvian Modernism. He was also profoundly inspired by the series of paintings of his fellow countryman Jazeps Grosvalds, bringing to these themes his own intimist painter's sensitivity.

He used his influences and interests to create a personal style characterised by expressiveness, simplicity, synthesis and distortion of forms. He was involved in the formation of the Expressionists' Group in 1919 and then the Riga Artists' Group as its theoretician and first chairman.

Several of his major works portray the everyday life of refugees, he also painted portraits and self-portraits. His medium was conditional colour pattern in oil and water colour which he augmented with various graphic techniques (Indian ink, drawing, linocut, woodcut). Over 40 of his oil paintings as well as around 150 of his water colours and drawings are exhibited at the Latvian State Museum of Art.

He died of tuberculosis at the age of 25.

== Selected paintings ==
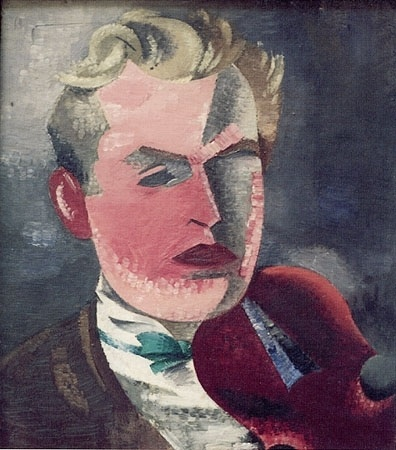
Portrait of Julijas Sproga

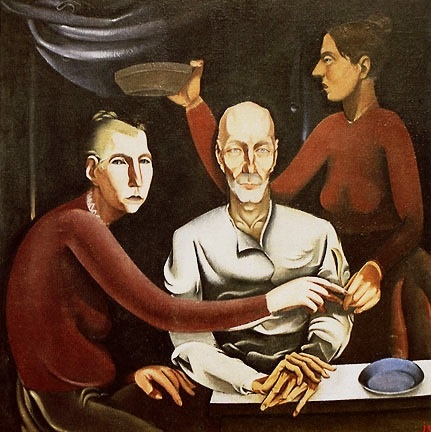
At the Table

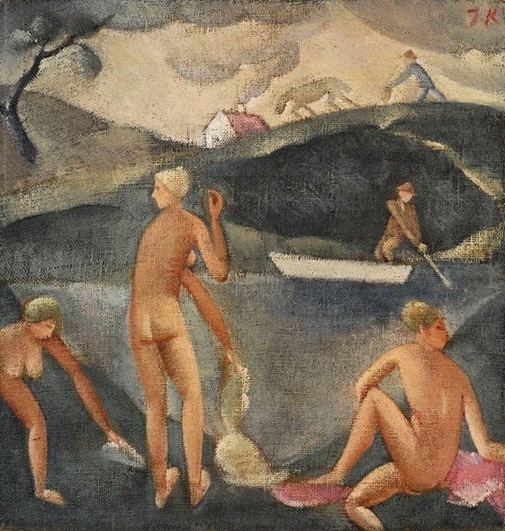
Bathers

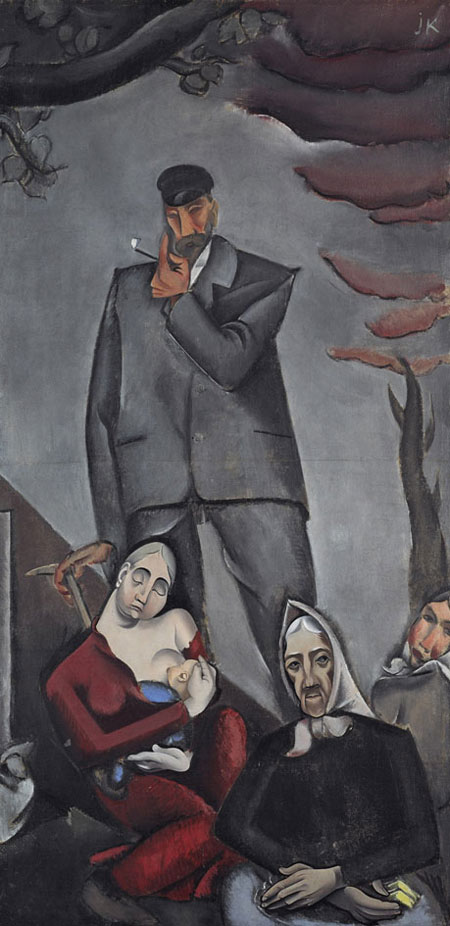
Refugees

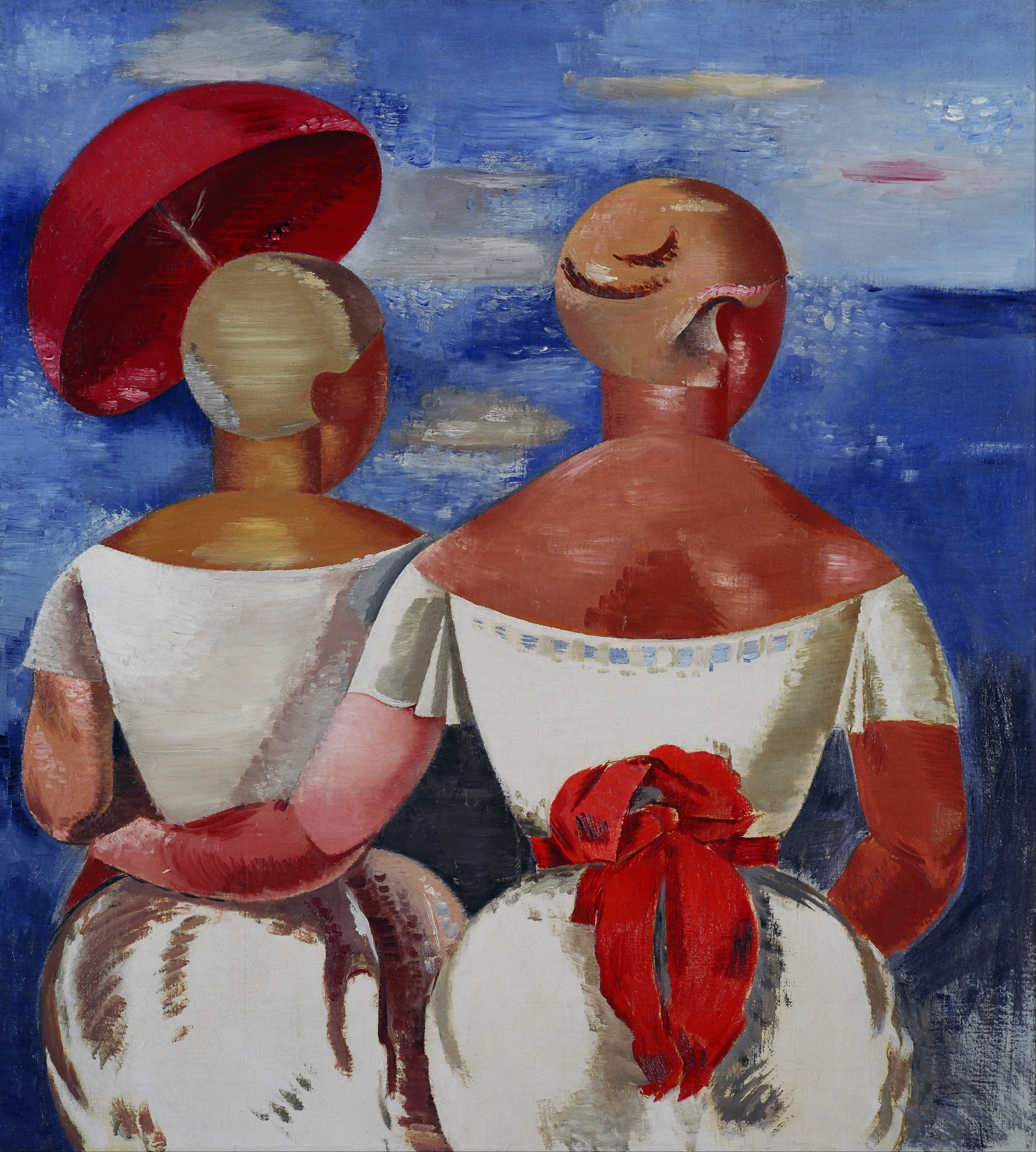
Ladies at the Seaside (1920)
