= The Gauja Valley =

1891 painting by Jūlijs Feders

- Gaujas leja (Latvian)
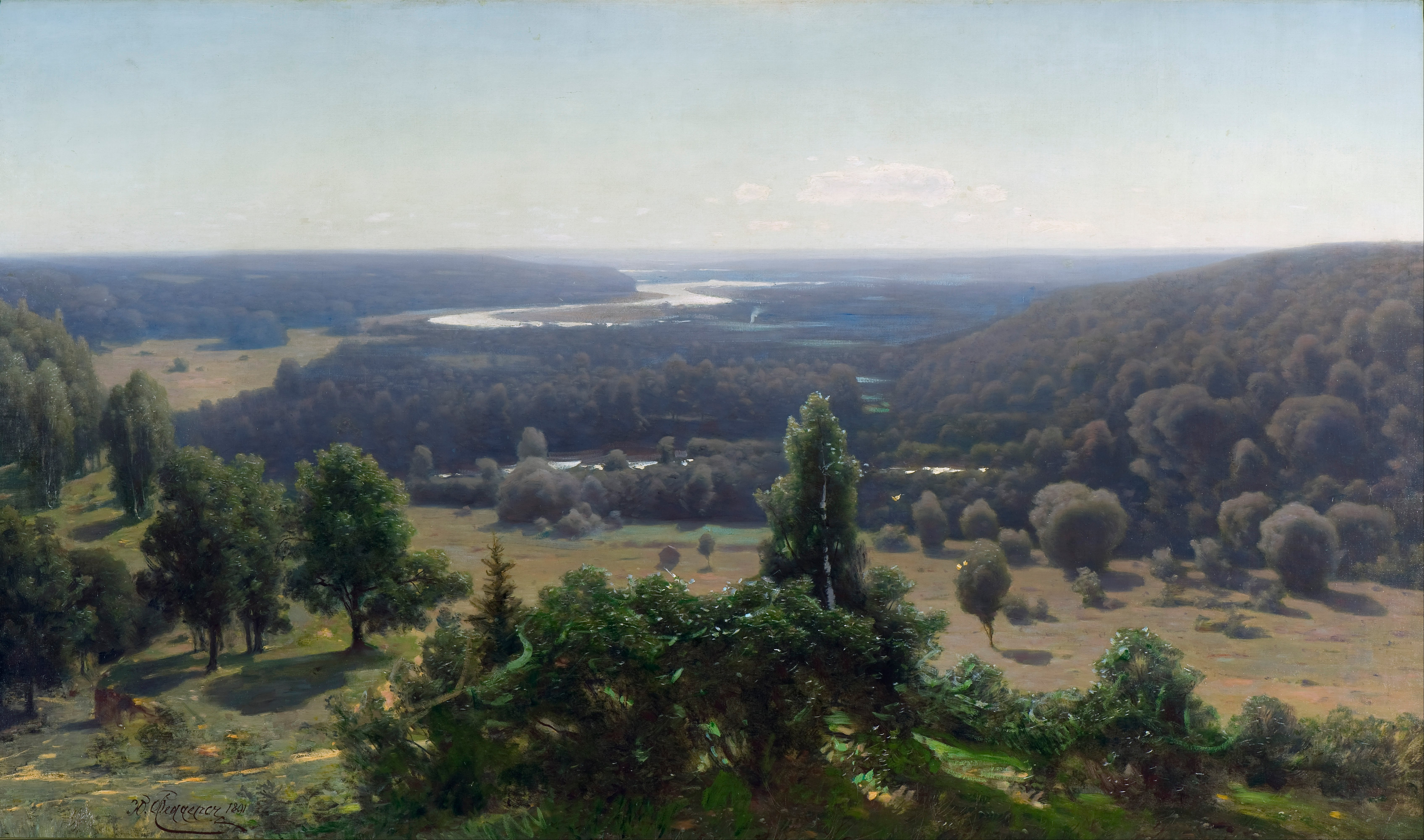
- Year: 1891
- Medium: oil on canvas
- Dimensions: 101 cm × 173 cm (40 in × 68 in)
- Location: Latvian National Museum of Art; Riga

The Gauja Valley (Latvian Gaujas leja) is a painting by Latvian painter Jūlijs Feders from 1891.

== Description ==
Gaujas leja is one of the best known of the artist's works; the painting became one of the symbols of Latvian landscape. It is an oil painting on canvas and measures 101 x 173 cm.

It is located in the Latvian National Museum of Art.

== Provenance ==
The painting was first exhibited at the Art Academy exhibition in St. Petersburg. After twenty years it was owned by a private collector. In 1921, the Riga City Art Museum purchased it.
