= Kārlis Padegs =

Latvian artist

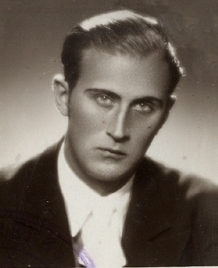
- Born: 8 October 1911; Rīga, Russian Empire
- Died: 19 April 1940 (aged 28); Riga, Latvia
- Known for: art
- Movement: Expressionism

Kārlis Padegs (8 October 1911 – 19 April 1940) was a Latvian artist. He studied under Latvian painter Vilhelms Purvītis at the Latvia Art Academy. His best-known work is Madonna with Machine Gun, which belongs to the Latvian National Museum of Art in Riga.

== Biography ==
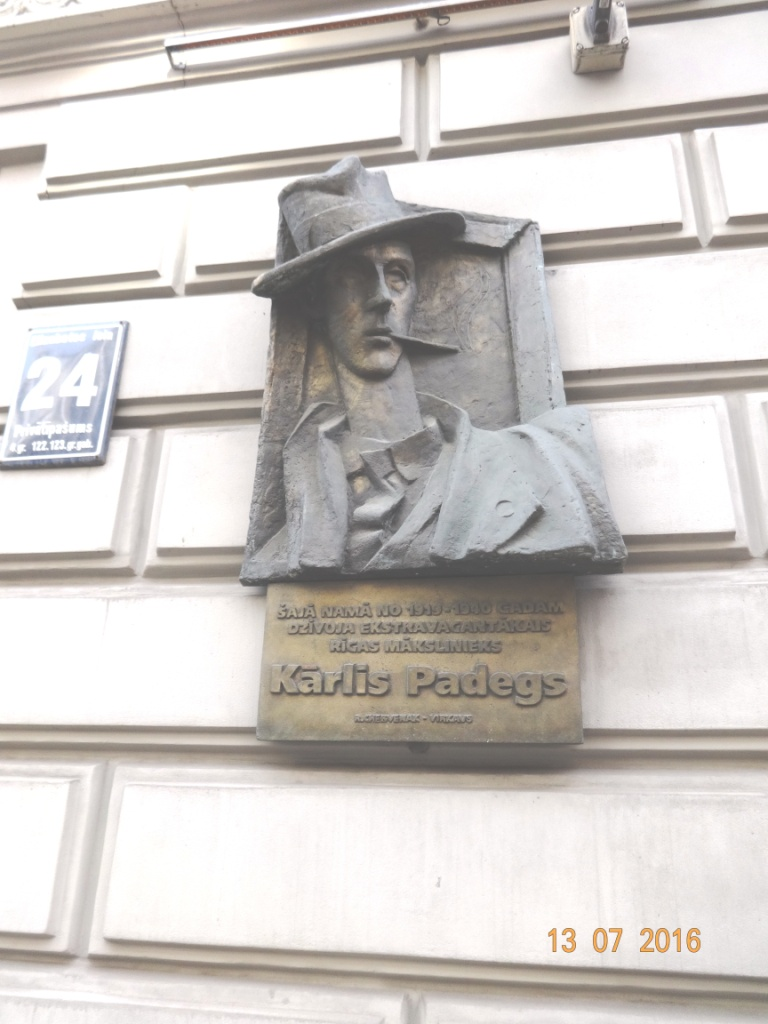
Commemorative plaque devoted to Kārlis Padegs at Elizabete iela 24, Riga

Kārlis Padegs was born on 8 October 1911 in Torņakalns, a workers district of Riga. He died in Riga in April 1940 from tuberculosis, aged 28.

In 1921, three years later than he should have, Kārlis Padegs enrolled in the Riga City Primary School No.1, which was headed by Valdis Zālītis. Padegs' drawing abilities were noticed early on by his drawing teacher Ernests Veilands, who in his lessons talked a lot about his impressions of travelling abroad and about certain issues of art history.

In the last year of primary school, Kārlis Padegs was active in the Applied Arts Section of the Latvian Youth Red Cross, where he served as secretary. It was here that Kārlis Padegs wrote an essay on the painter Jānis Rozentāls for a school event, expressing a very independent perception of art. Kārlis Padegs graduated from the 1st Primary School in Riga in 1928 without showing any outstanding abilities.

After graduating from primary school at the age of 16, when he was a little too old to continue his studies at secondary school, Kārlis Padegs mastered a plaster head drawing and, together with 20 other applicants, won the right to attend the first year classes of the Art Academy of Latvia at the Vilhelms Purvītis Master Workshop.

== Art ==
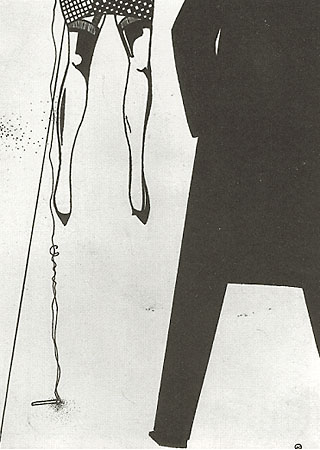
My Babe from the Street (1930)

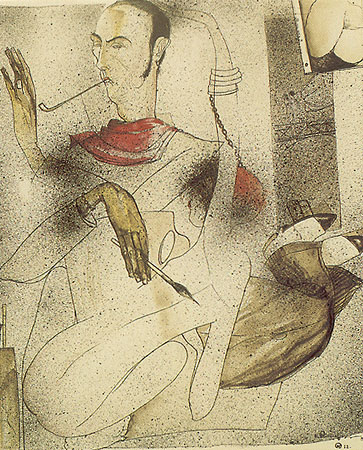
Self-portrait (1932)

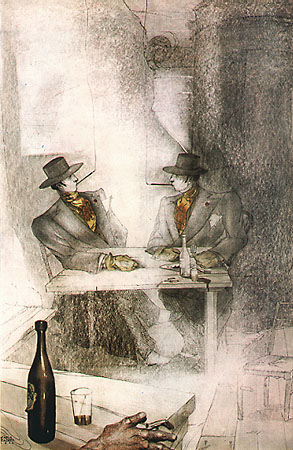
Mr. Padegs and the Astral (1939)

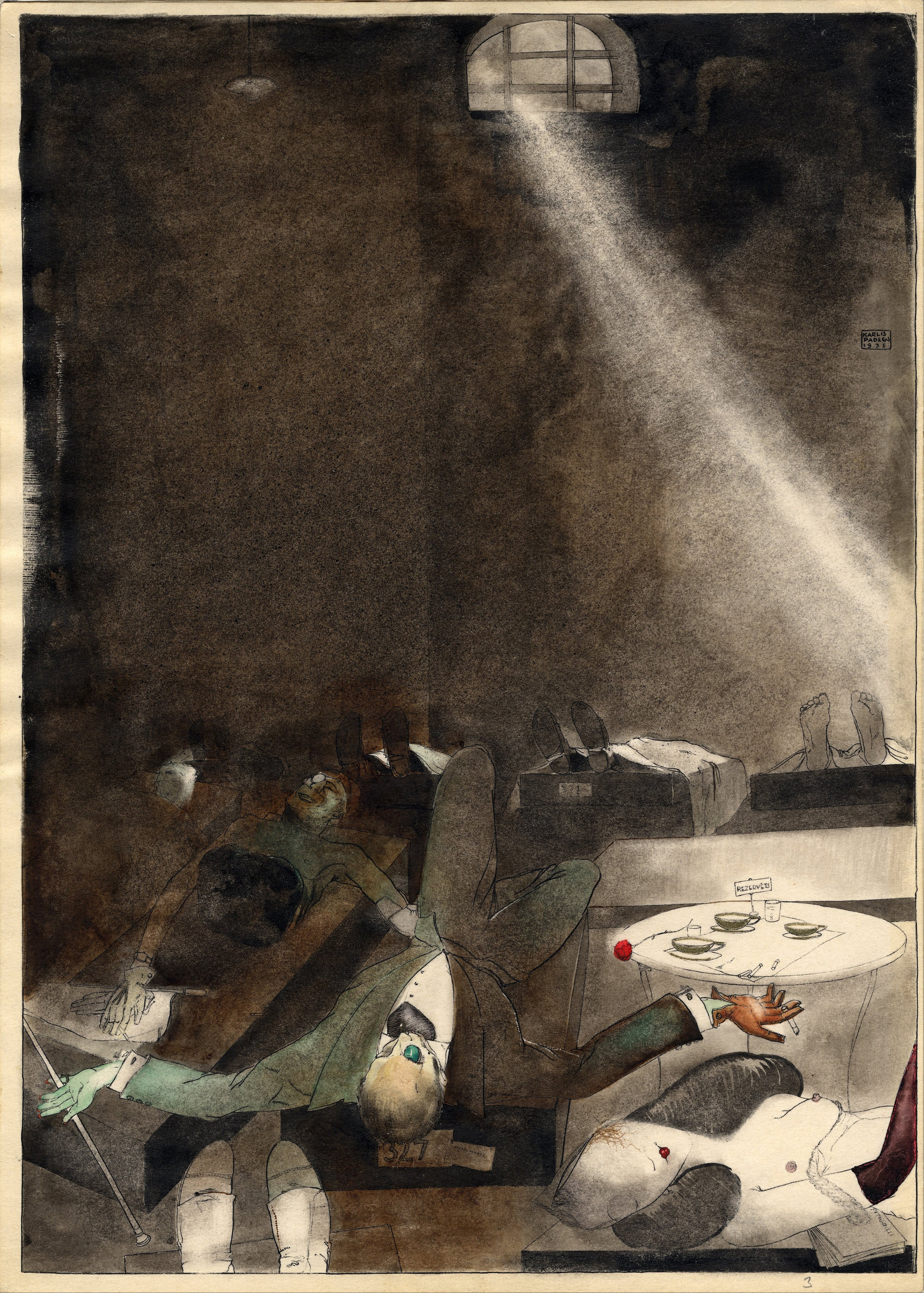
Five o'clock in the morgue (1935)

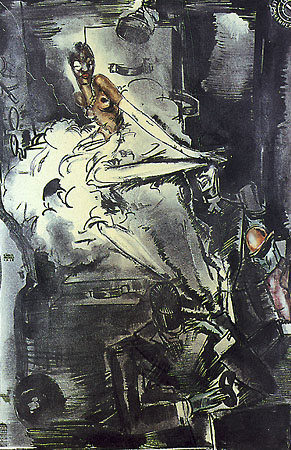
Cabaret (1935)

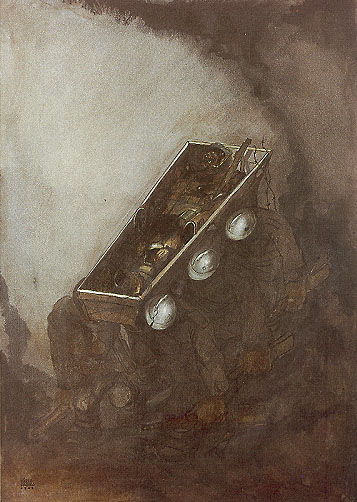
Funeral of the unknown soldiers (1939)

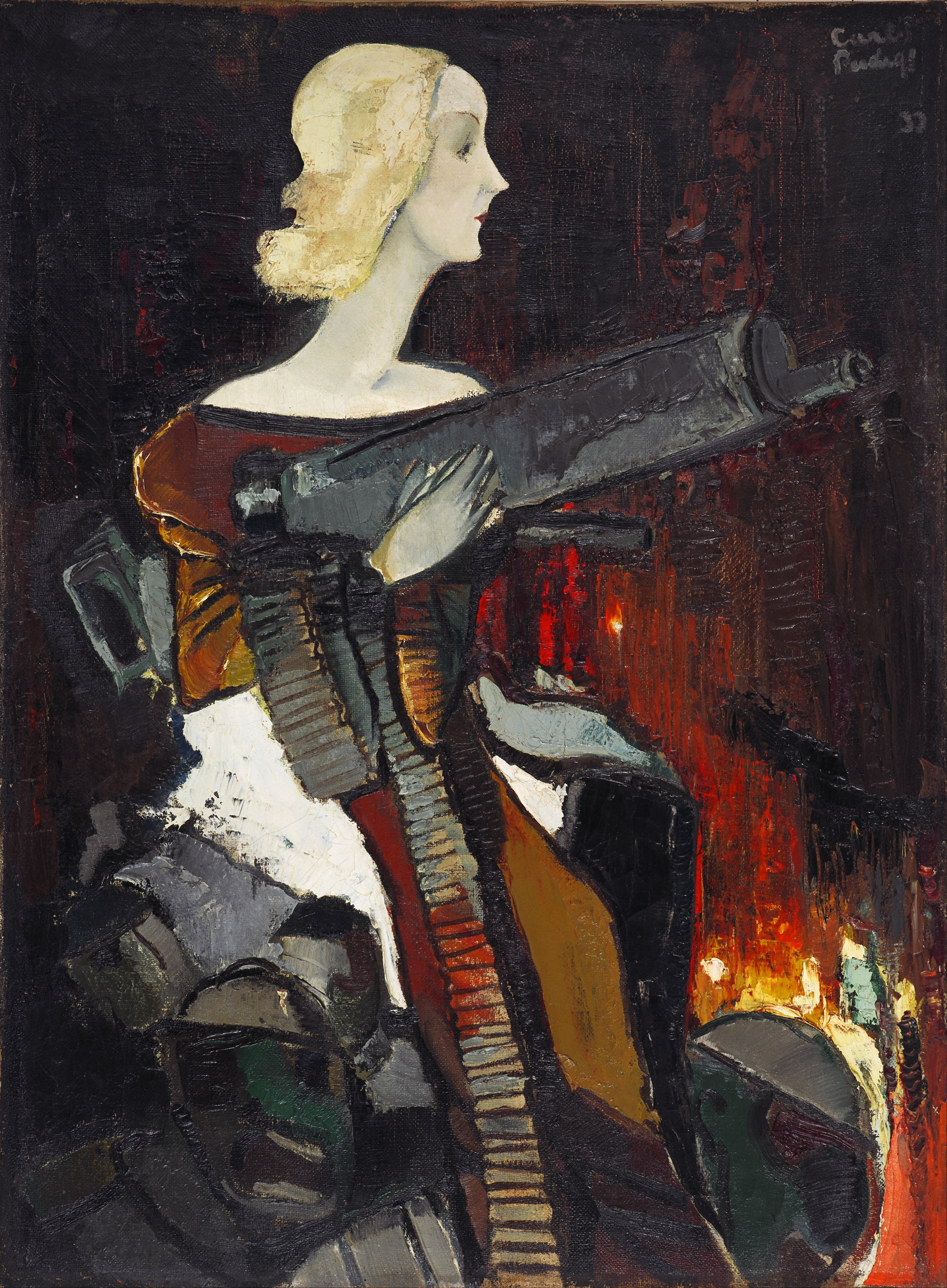
Madonna with Machine Gun (1932)

After an exhibition mounted in 1933, Padegs' art became an expression of unpleasant, even ugly traits, contrasting with the contemporary tendency towards beauty in Latvian art. Padegs once said: "I must often listen to reproaches- why do you draw such disgusting pictures when there is so much beauty in the world?- But there are also many abominable things and somebody must draw them too, I answer. I want to show the seamy side of life which we do not like to see in order not to spoil our feeling of comfort or our good appetite".
