= Niklāvs Strunke =

Latvian artist and illustrator

- Born: October 6, 1894; Gostynina, Russian Empire (now Poland)
- Died: October 13, 1966; Rome, Italy
- Known for: painting
- Movement: cubism, expressionism, constructivism

Niklāvs Strunke (1894–1966) was a Latvian painter and graphic artist. One of the most original artists of the Latvian modernist generation, he also worked in stained glass and scenography. He wrote about art. (also under the pseudonym Palmenu Klavs). Born 6 October 1894 in Gostynin, Russian Empire, to the family of a non-commissioned officer in the army of the Russian Empire. In 1903 he moved to Valmiera to live with his father's sister, and in 1909 he graduated from Liepiņš Progymnasium there. He moved to St. Petersburg with his father, and studied 1909–11 at the school of the Imperial Society for the Encouragement of the Arts under Nikolai Roerich and Ivan Bilibin.

== Biography ==
In 1910, he trained at the Jan Zionglinsky Studio and Mikhail Bernstein Art Studio (1911–1913) for a few months, both of which belonged to the “left-wing Cubist trend.” He earned a master of painting, made illustrations for A. Lāčs, began to illustrate fairy tales, and returned to St. Petersburg, where he studied at the Sherwood and Bernstein Art Studio in 1914. Strunke studied graphic techniques with Vasily Matt in the workshop of the St. Petersburg Academy of Arts in 1915.

=== First World War ===
In 1915 Strunke volunteered for the Equestrian Intelligence Division of the 6th Latvian Rifle Regiment. In 1917, Strunke was in Cēsis, then in Valka, and returned to St. Petersburg. From there he arrived in Vilnius with foreign documents. After founding the Latvian SPR at the beginning of 1919, he returned to Riga, where he worked as a graphic artist, created book covers and drew a sketch for the Moscow Latvian Theater. He joined the innovative, French-oriented Expressionist Group, which became the Riga Artists' Group (abandoned in 1920). In 1919, the May 1 festival was held in Riga. He improved his skills at Riga People's University.

In 1923 he went to Berlin (he created paintings, drawings and book illustrations), in 1923 he participated in the Great Berlin Art Exhibition. In the autumn of 1923, he went to Rome, Florence, and Capri. Strunke lived in Italy until July 1925. In 1926, he went to Italy for the second time, lived in Florence, and produced watercolors, oil paintings, and illustrations for fairy tales. In 1933, Strunk was awarded the Order of the Three Stars (Level IV Officer). In 1940, he organized his own 25th-anniversary retrospective exhibition.

=== World War II ===
In 1944, Niklāvs Strunke fled to Sweden. He held solo exhibitions in Karlstad (1945), Malmö (1947) and Lund (1948). He participated in the exhibition of Estonian and Latvian artists in Stockholm (1946) and in the exhibition of the Hamburg Song Festival (1964).

== Creative work ==
In addition to the impressions of Cubism and Constructivism, Strunke was interested in Italian art and Latvian folk art. He participated in the exhibitions of the Riga Artists' Group. He painted still lifes, portraits, and landscapes, and made a significant contribution to book graphics:

- Anna Brigadere's "Son of Power" in 1923,
- "Black Tales" in 1925,
- Man Entering a Room, 1927,
- Vilis Plūdonis "Hedgehog Coat" in 1927,
- A. Chuck's "Umurkumurs" in 1932,

Between 1920 and 1944, Strunke drew the covers of more than 700 books, illustrated about 30 novels, poetry or fairy tales, worked as a decorator at the National Theater, the Workers' Theater, the National Opera (scenery for about 40 performances), and worked in applied art (glass paintings). In Riga and Sigulda, about 50 drawings for porcelain painting for the J. Jessen porcelain factory in Riga. He wrote critiques and reflections on art.

Solo exhibitions in Stockholm were held in 1927, 1952 and 1962.

Niklāvs Strunke died October 13, 1966, in Rome.

== See also ==
- Expressionism
- Nathan Altman: at Bernstein studio
- Latvian mythology

== Bibliography ==
- Dzintra Andrušaite. Niklavs Strunke. Versija par Palmēnu Klāvu (Version of the Palmenian Clave). - Valters and Rapa: Riga, 2002., - 227 pages, ISBN 9984-595-71-4
- Māksla un arhitektūra biogrāfijās, (Art and architecture in biographies). / red. A. Vanaga - Riga, 2000 - 3 vol.
- Siliņš J. Latvijas māksla 1915—1940, (Latvian Art 1915—1940). - Stockholm, 1988 - Vol.
- Latviešu futūrists un tradīciju noliedzējs Niklāvs Strunke — jaunatklātās teorētisko uzskatu liecības (Latvian Futurist and anti-traditionalist Niklāvs Strunke — newly discovered theoretical statements) // Materiāli par latviešu un cittautu kultūru LatvijāLatvian Futurist and anti-traditionalist Niklāvs Strunke - newly discovered theoretical statements // Materials on Latvian and non-Latvian culture in Latvia / Ed. by Inguna Daukste-Silasproģe. - Science: Riga, 2003. - P. 101—109.
- Ginta Gerharde-Upeniece, Originality in Latvian Art: Between Confirmation and Destruction. The Routledge Companion to Expressionism in a Transnational Context. August 2018. ISBN 9781138712553
- Aija Brasliņa.International Yearbook of Futurism Studies. Volume 1: Issue 1. Modernists in Berlin and Rome in the 1920s: Encounters with secondo futurismo. DOI: https://doi.org/10.1515/9783110237771.231. 16 Nov 2011, De Gruyter
- Suzanne Pourchier-Plasseraud. Arts and a Nation: The Role of Visual Arts and Artists in the Making of the Latvian Identity, 1905–1940. On the Boundary of Two Worlds. BRILL, 2015. ISBN 9004300287
