= Johann Karl Bähr =

German painter and writer

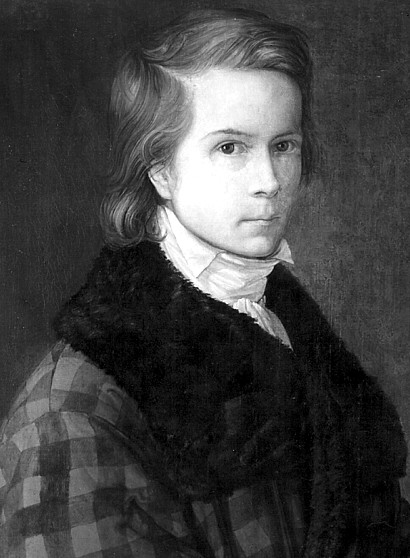
- Self-portrait (1820)
- Born: 18 August 1801; Riga, Governorate of Livonia, Russian Empire
- Died: 29 September 1869 (aged 68); Dresden, Kingdom of Saxony
- Occupations: Painter, writer

Johann Karl Bähr (1801–1869) was a German painter and writer.

== Life ==
Bähr was born in Riga on 18 August 1801. He studied under Matthaei in Dresden and completed his art education with a visit to Italy in 1827–29. He married in Dresden, then spent some time back in Riga, before settling permanently in Dresden in 1832. He was made a Professor at the Dresden Academy of Fine Arts in 1840. Enthusiastic about poetry, he moved in the circle of Ludwig Tieck in Dresden, and was a close friend of Julius Mosen.

He then worked again in Riga and finally went to Dresden for good in 1836. Here he taught at the Art Academy from 1840, where he was appointed professor in 1846.

Bähr was in demand as a portraitist, and also painted some historical works. He wrote several books: Die Gräber der Liven (1850), a report on some archaeological excavations in Livonia which he undertook in 1846; Lectures on Dante's Divine Comedy (1853); Lectures on the Colour Theories of Newton and Goethe (1863) and The Dynamic Circle (1860–68), a scientific work which occupied him almost exclusively for the last ten years of his life.

Bähr's large collection of Latvian medieval antiquities was purchased by the British Museum in 1852.

He died at Dresden on 29 September 1869.

== Works ==
His paintings include:

- Virgil and Dante.
- The Anabaptists in Münster (lithographed by Hanfstängl, and by Teichgräber).
- Iwan the Cruel, of Russia, warned of his death by a Finnish Magician (signed and dated 1850); in the Dresden Galiery.
- Christ and St. Thomas (at Kiev).
- Christ on the Cross (at Zschopau),
- Portrait of Julius Mosen (lithographed by Hanfstängl).

== Sources ==
Attribution:
