= Jāzeps Grosvalds =

Latvian painter

- Born: 24 April 1891; Rīga, Russian Empire (now Latvia)
- Died: 1 February 1920 (aged 28); Paris, France
- Known for: Painting
- Movement: Post-Impressionism, Modernism

Jazeps Grosvalds (Latvian: Jāzeps Grosvalds) (24 April 1891 – 1 February 1920) was a Latvian painter from Riga. He is now regarded as one of Latvia's finest painters, bringing new ideas in Latvian art at the time, and has several works on display in the Latvian National Museum of Art. Although he spent most of his life abroad, his style is a combination of European Modernism and Abstract with a distinctly Latvian influence.

== Biography ==
Jāzeps Grosvalds was born on 24 April 1891 in Riga as son of well known Latvian lawyer Frīdrihs Grosvalds. His family was quite wealthy and their apartment at the center of Riga was a gathering place for many Latvian intellectuals. Jāzeps was raised in typical bourgeois traditions and from an early age was educated in foreign languages, piano play and painting. From 1901 until 1909, he studied in Riga city gymnasium. After graduation his parents financed his trip to Germany where he met his older brother Olģerts a philology student in Berlin. He also had opportunity to meet art historian Kurt Glaser and see original paintings of van Gogh and Manet from his collection. From 1909 until 1910, Grosvalds was a student of Simon Hollósy's school in Munich. In 1911, Grosvalds was drafted into Russian imperial army and spent his one-year service in cavalry regiment which was based in Lithuania.

Critical of the opportunities presented by the Munich art establishment, Grosvalds went to Paris in 1910, where he studied at several private academies (for example La Palette). He also studied under K. van Dongen In addition to this, he immersed himself in the flourishing art scene of the time, inspirited by Parisian artistic and intellectual environment, studying both modern art (Cézanne, Degas, Renoir) as well as the old masters. In summer of 1914, just before a war was breaking out over Europe, Grosvalds returned to Riga with several other Latvian painters Konrāds Ubāns, Voldemars Tone and Aleksandrs Drēviņš. They were determined to create something new - an exciting, challenging and emphatically Latvian art movement. They set up the artists' circle Zaļā puķe (Green Flower), which transformed over time firstly into the Expressionists' Group and then the Riga Artists Group. In August 1914, he together with his brother Olģerts traveled through Spain.

In 1915; Grosvalds was mobilized in the Russian army as a cavalry officer and joined the 6th Tukums Latvian Rifleman regiment. He commanded scout unit and actively painted scenes from daily life of soldiers and refugees (cf. The Refugees, 1915–1917 series, and Latvian Riflemen, 1916–1917 series). In 1917 he was commanded to the western front where he soon joined the British army. In 1918 Grosvalds as a British First lieutenant joined the British Expeditionary Group and traveled through Arabia, Persia and Caucasus. His experiences were documented in more than hundred pictures with Persian landscapes (Oriental series, 1918–1919). For his service he was awarded with the British Military Cross.

In summer 1919 Grosvalds was demobilised and replaced his brother Olģerts as a secretary of Latvian delegation in Paris peace conference. In December he started to work in Embassy of Latvia in Paris.

He died from Spanish flu on 1 February 1920 in Paris. His cremated remains were stored in Père Lachaise Cemetery columbarium until 1925 when they were buried in Riga Great cemetery.

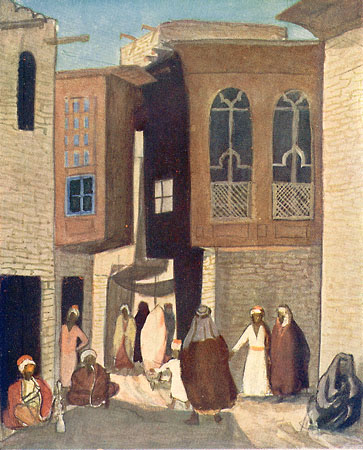
A Street in Baghdad (1918)

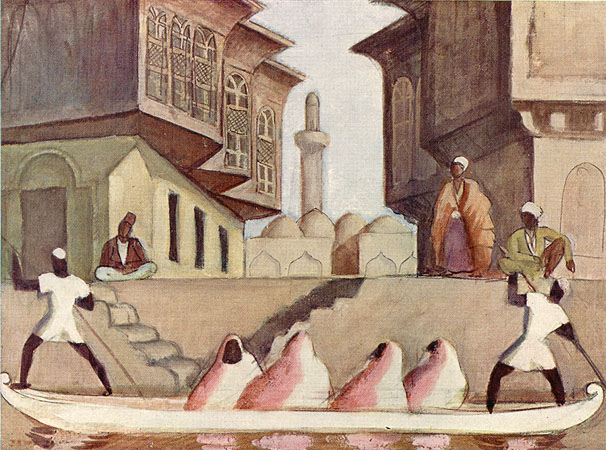
Oriental Landscape (1918)

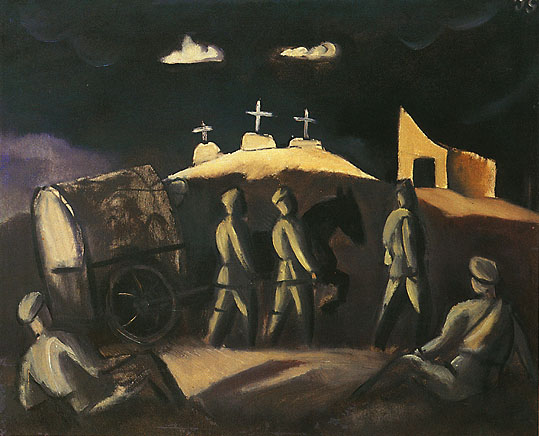
White Crosses (1916)

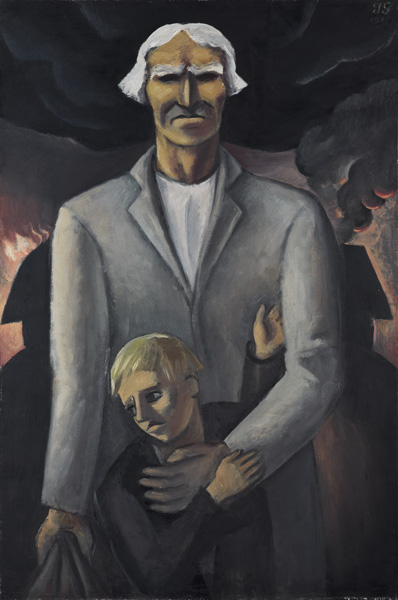
Old Refugee (1917)

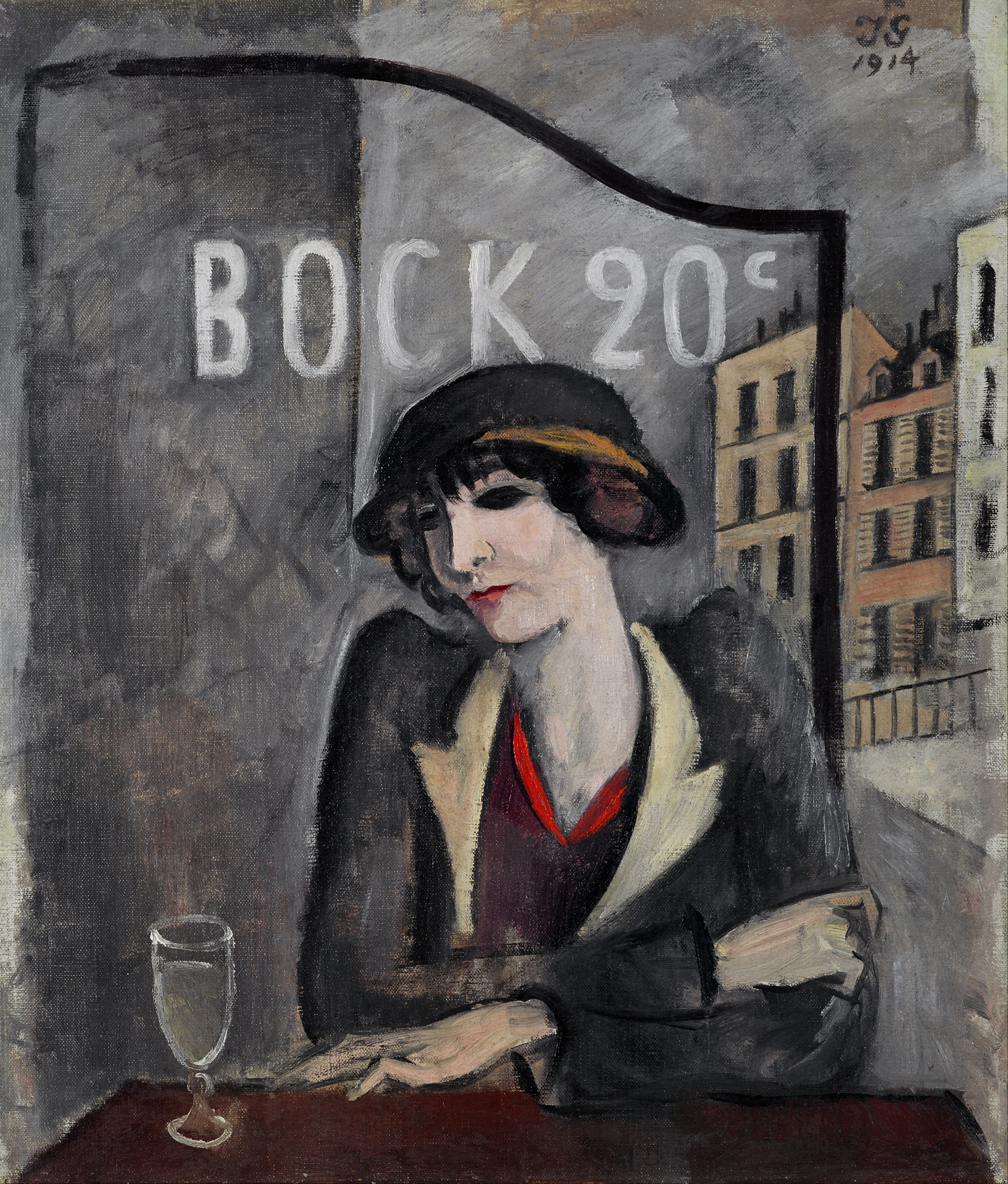
In the Outskirts of Paris (1914)

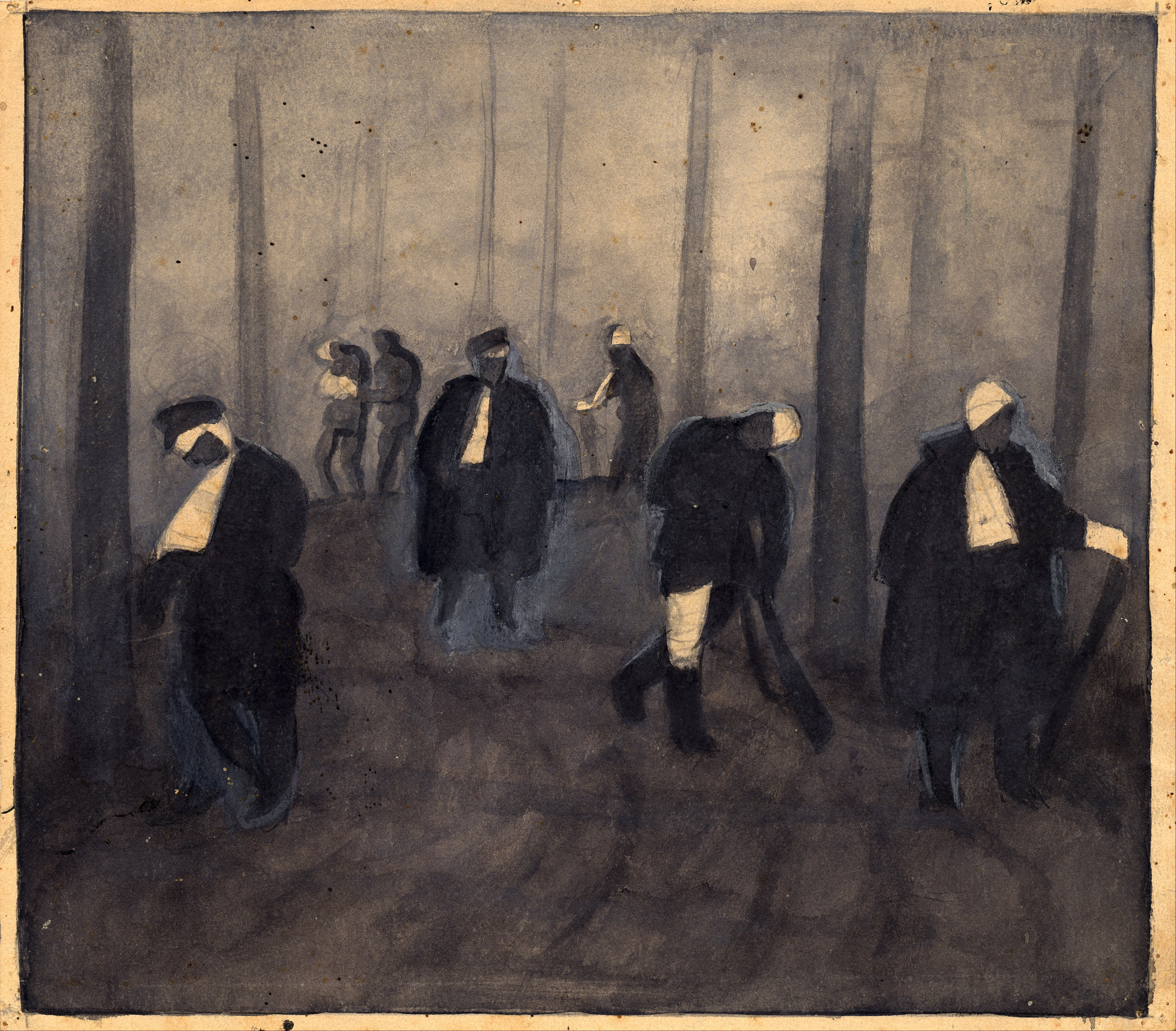
Path of the Nightmare (1916)

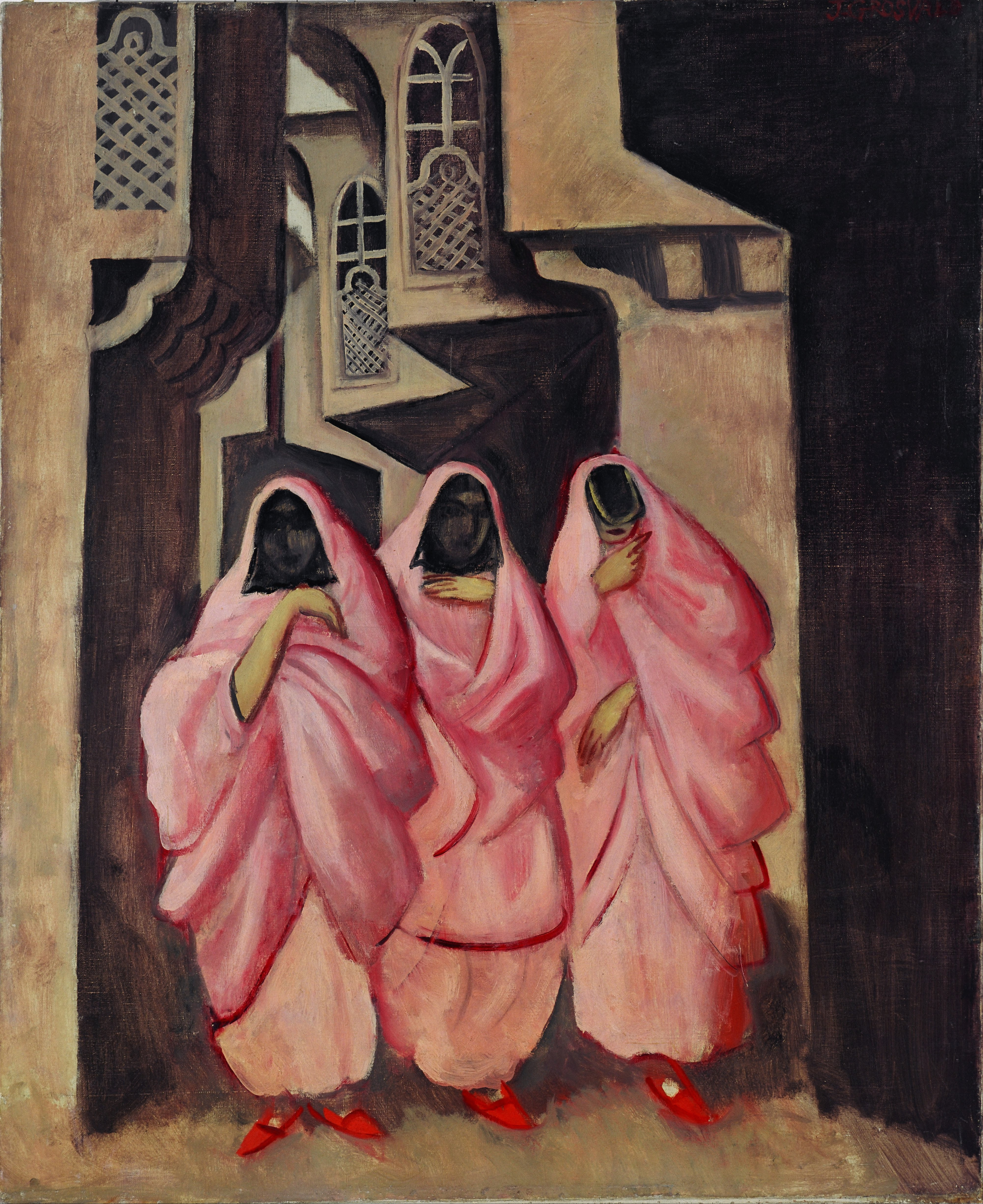
Three Women on the Street of Baghdad (1919)

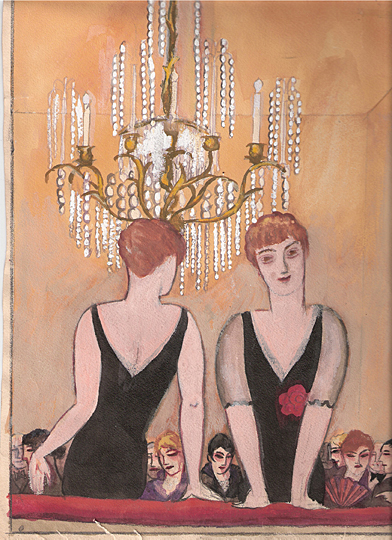
At the theatre (1911-14)

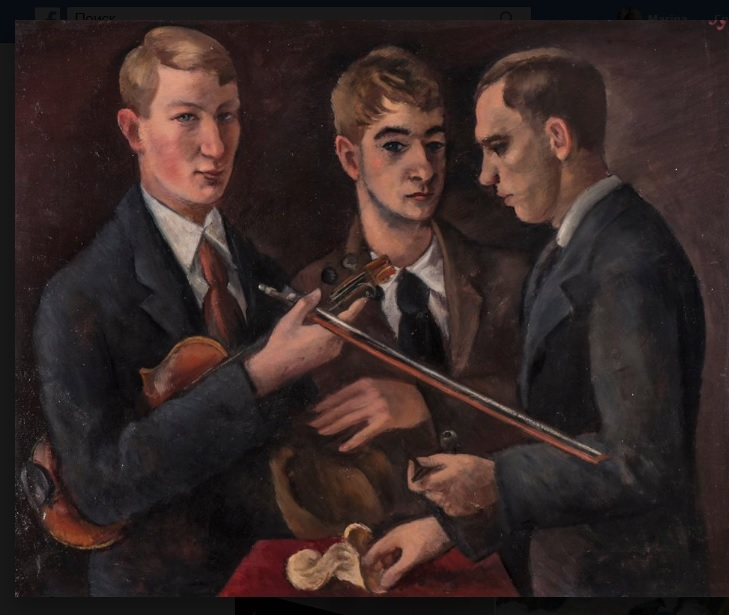
Three artists (1915)
