= Arsenāls – Fine Arts Museum =

Latvian art museum

- Mākslas muzejs ARSENĀLS
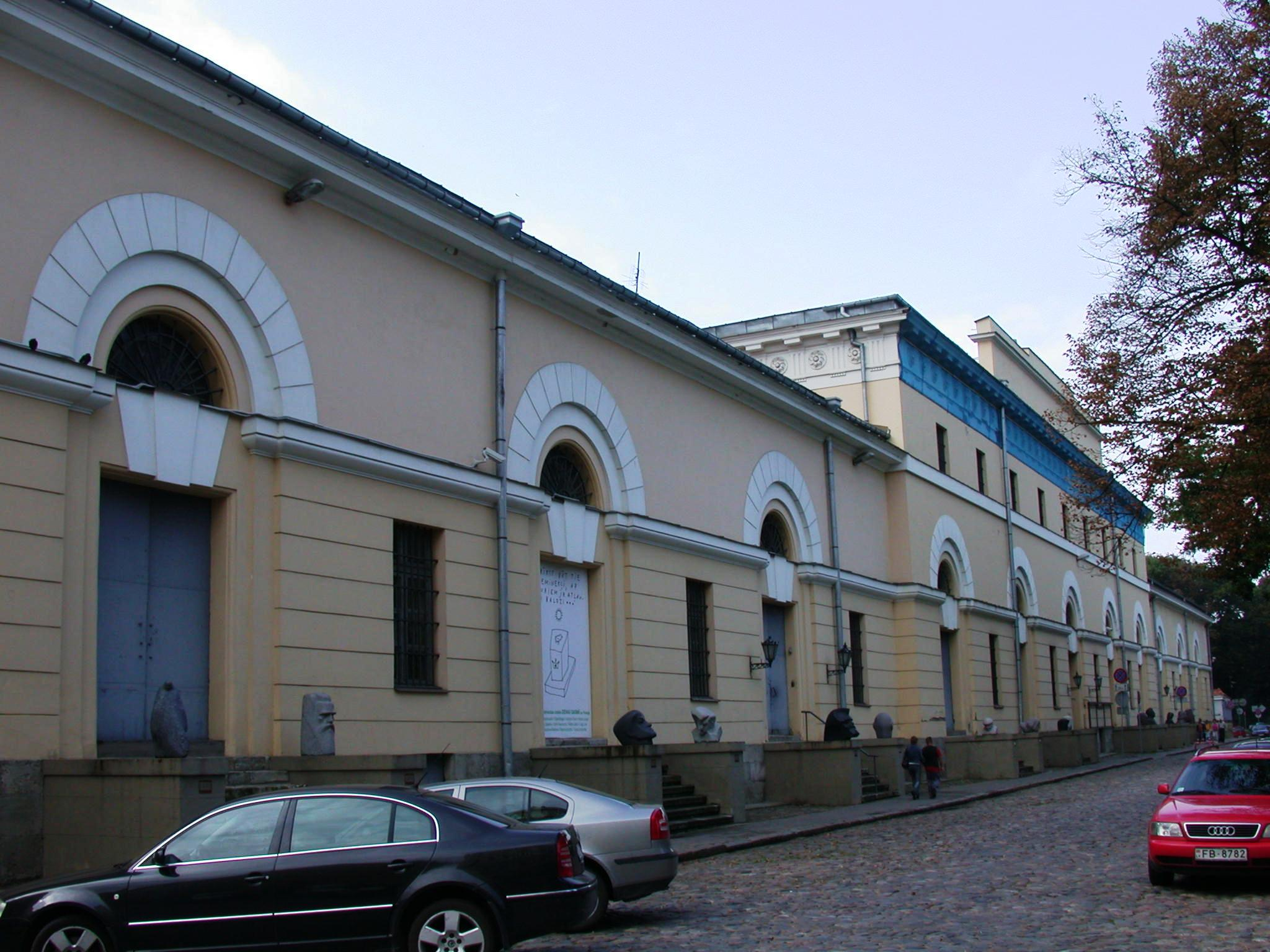
- Arsenāls building
- Interactive fullscreen map
- Location: Riga, Latvia
- Coordinates: 56°57′05″N 24°06′15″E
- Type: Art museum
- Owner: Latvian National Museum of Art
- Website: Official website

Arsenāls – Fine Arts Museum is an art museum in Riga, Latvia, department of the Latvian National Museum of Art.

The museum's collections include Baltic and Latvian art from the 18th century forward. Arsenāls at Torņa iela 1 is one of the largest exhibition halls in Riga. It is located in a customs warehouse of the 19th century. It was adapted for museum use in the second half of the 1980s. The hall also hosted exhibitions of conceptual art, international projects and solo exhibitions by Latvian and foreign artists.

Since February 2020 it is closed for the reconstruction of the building with the idea that the Arsenāls should be the home of a permanent display of Latvian art from the second half of the 20th century.
