= Jānis Tīdemanis =

Latvian painter

- Born: 1 October 1897; Ventspils, Latvia
- Died: 12 April 1964 (aged 66); Toronto, Ontario, Canada
- Occupation: Painter

Jānis Tīdemanis (1 October 1897 – 12 April 1964) was a Latvian painter. His work was part of the painting event in the art competition at the 1932 Summer Olympics, representing Belgium.
