= Deaths in June 2002 =

The following is a list of notable deaths in June 2002.

Entries for each day are listed alphabetically by surname. A typical entry lists information in the following sequence:

- Name, age, country of citizenship at birth, subsequent country of citizenship (if applicable), reason for notability, cause of death (if known), and reference.

== June 2002 ==
=== 1 ===
- Michael Alexander, 65, British diplomat (ambassador to Austria, ambassador to NATO) and Olympic fencer (1960).
- Tom Austin, 78, Australian politician.
- Hansie Cronje, 32, South African cricketer, plane crash.
- Joseph Nanven Garba, 58, Nigerian soldier, diplomat and politician.
- James Gathers, 71, American Olympic track and field athlete (1952).
- Jerry Houghton, 76, American football player (Washington Redskins, Chicago Cardinals).
- Tibor Scitovsky, 91, Hungarian-American economist.

=== 2 ===
- Boyd Bennett, 77, American rockabilly songwriter and singer ("Seventeen", "My Boy, Flat Top"), lung ailment.
- Herman Cohen, 76, American film producer (I Was a Teenage Werewolf), esophageal cancer.
- Tim Lopes, 51, Brazilian investigative journalist and television producer, tortured.
- Hugo van Lawick, 65, Dutch wildlife filmmaker and photographer.
- Konrad Wirnhier, 64, German Olympic sports shooter (1968, 1972).

=== 3 ===
- Charles Antrobus, 69, Governor-General of St. Vincent and the Grenadines, leukemia.
- Donald Buck, 85, American Olympic field hockey player (1948).
- Cecil Hankins, 80, American basketball player (St. Louis Bombers, Boston Celtics).
- Fran Rogel, 74, American football player (Penn State, Pittsburgh Steelers), Parkinson's disease.
- Edward Somers, 73, New Zealand jurist and member of the Privy Council.
- Lew Wasserman, 89, American talent agent and studio executive (Universal Studios, Decca Records, MCA), complications from a stroke.
- Laughlin Edward Waters Sr., 87, American district judge (United States District Court for the Central District of California).
- Sam Whipple, 41, American actor (Seven Days, The Larry Sanders Show, Open All Night), cancer.
- Brian Woledge, 97, English scholar of medieval French language and literature.

=== 4 ===
- Fernando Belaúnde, 89, Peruvian politician, President of Peru (1963–1968, 1980–1985).
- Maria da Costa, 71, Brazilian Olympic swimmer (1948).
- John W. Cunningham, 86, American author.
- Ann Henderson, 60, Australian politician.
- Pyotr Ivashutin, 92, Soviet Army General and head of the state.
- Bob Lackey, 53, American professional basketball player (Marquette University, New York Nets), cancer.

=== 5 ===
- Curtis Amy, 74, American jazz saxophonist.
- Carlos Berlanga, 42, Spanish musician and painter, liver disease.
- Carmelo Bernaola, 72, Spanish composer and clarinetist.
- Michel Bernholc, 60, French composer, arranger and producer, suicide by gunshot.
- Bill Bradley, 60, American basketball player (Kentucky Colonels).
- Orlando Fantoni, 85, Brazilian footballer and manager.
- Gaston Geens, 70, Belgian politician, Minister-President of Flanders (1981 -1992).
- Aden Abdullahi Nur, Somali politician and army general.
- Truck Parham, 91, American jazz double-bassist.
- Gwen Plumb, 89, Australian performer and entertainer.
- Dee Dee Ramone, 50, American musician, founding member of The Ramones, heroin overdose.
- M. Sivasithamparam, 78, Sri Lankan Tamil politician.
- Alex Watson, 70, Australian rugby league footballer.

=== 6 ===
- Peter Cowan, 87, Australian writer.
- Robbin Crosby, 42, American guitarist (Ratt), AIDS-related complications and heroin overdose.
- Bernard Destremau, 85, French tennis player, diplomat and politician.
- Yat Malmgren, 86, Swedish dancer and acting teacher.
- Shanta Shelke, 79, Indian poet and writer in the Marathi language, cancer.
- Holly Solomon, 68, American collector of contemporary art and art dealer, complications from pneumonia.
- Tadeusz Świcarz, 82, Polish footballer and Olympic ice hockey player (1952).
- Betty Winkler, 88, American radio actor.

=== 7 ===
- Wayne Cody, 65, American sportscaster.
- Donald S. Fredrickson, 77, American medical researcher.
- Signe Hasso, 86, Swedish actress, writer, and composer, pneumonia.
- Rodney Hilton, 85, British medieval historian.
- Basappa Danappa Jatti, 89, Indian politician and acting president of India (1977), kidney cancer.
- James Luisi, 73, American basketball player and actor, cancer.
- Lilian, Princess of Réthy, 85, British-Belgian royal.
- Anselmo Sule, 68, Chilean politician.
- Edmond Séchan, 82, French cinematographer and film director.

=== 8 ===
- Ray Alexander, 77, American jazz drummer and vibraphonist, complications from elective surgery.
- George Mudie, 86, Jamaican cricketer.
- Antonio Oppes, 85, Italian Olympic equestrian (1960).
- Lino Tonti, 81, Italian motorcycle engineer.

=== 9 ===
- Elena Burke, 74, Cuban singer of boleros and romantic ballads, cancer.
- Paul Chubb, 53, Australian actor (The Coca-Cola Kid, Stan and George's New Life, The Roly Poly Man, Dirty Deeds), post operative cardiomyopathy complications.
- Hans Janmaat, 67, Dutch far-right politician, heart failure.
- Bob McDonald, 70, Canadian football player and politician.
- Peter Mokaba, 53, South African politician and political activist, acute pneumonia and respiratory problems.
- Alexander Molodchy, 81, Soviet long-range pilot during World War II.
- Maxwell M. Rabb, 91, American lawyer and diplomat.
- Alexander Vlasov, 70, Soviet/Russian politician.
- James Wheaton, 78, American actor, heart attack.

=== 10 ===
- Dick Brittenden, 82, New Zealand cricket writer.
- Louis Carré, 77, Belgian football player and coach.
- John Gotti, 61, Italian-American gangster and boss of the Gambino crime family, throat cancer.
- Maury Travis, 36, American murderer and serial killer, suicide by hanging.
- Panagiotis Ventouris, 59, Greek footballer.
- John Wansbrough, 74, American historian and professor.
- Benjamin Ward, 75, first African American New York City Police Commissioner.

=== 11 ===
- Tahseen Bashir, 77, Egyptian diplomat, spokesman for Gamal Nasser and Anwar Sadat.
- Regīna Ezera, 71, Polish-Latvian author.
- Bertrand Goldschmidt, 89, French chemist, nuclear physicist and diplomat.
- Margaret E. Lynn, 78, American theater director.
- Jürgen Kraft, 50, German racing cyclist.
- Robert Roswell Palmer, 93, American historian and writer.
- Horace Roye, 96, British photographer, stabbed. (body discovered on this date)

=== 12 ===
- Bill Blass, 79, American fashion designer, esophageal cancer.
- Jean de Beaumont, 98, French IOC sports administrator and Olympic sport shooter (1924).
- Henry Boney, 98, American baseball player (New York Giants).
- John Tileston Edsall, 99, American biochemist.
- José Serra Gil, 78, Spanish racing cyclist.
- Richard A. Henson, 91–92, American test pilot and flight school operator, founder of Henson Airlines.
- Jeong Seung-hwa, 73, South Korean officer.

=== 13 ===
- Guilford Dudley, 94, American businessman and diplomat (U.S. Ambassador to Denmark).
- Vincent Fago, 87, American comic-book artist and writer, stomach cancer.
- Rubén González, 74, Chilean Olympic footballer (1952).
- Stanley L. Greigg, 71, American Watergate break-in victim and politician, member of the United States House of Representatives (1965-1967).
- John Hope, 83, American meteorologist, complications of an open heart surgery.
- R. W. B. Lewis, 84, American literary scholar and critic and winner of the Pulitzer Prize.
- Ante Mladinić, 72, Croatian football manager.
- Hideo Murata, 73, Japanese rōkyoku and enka singer.
- Naftaly Parrales, 63, Nicaraguan Olympic weightlifter (1976).
- Ralph Shapey, 81, American composer and conductor.
- Maia Wojciechowska, 74, Polish-American writer of children's books (Shadow of a Bull).

=== 14 ===
- Veikko Asikainen, 84, Finnish footballer and Olympian (1952).
- Albert Band, 78, American film director and film producer, frequently collaborated with John Huston.
- Rino Benedetti, 73, Italian road bicycle racer.
- José Bonilla, 34, Venezuelan boxer, asthma attack.
- Lily Carlstedt, 76, Danish Olympic javelin thrower (1948, 1952).
- George William Coventry, 11th Earl of Coventry, 68, British peer and politician.
- William Fajardo, 72, Mexican fencer and Olympian (1960, 1968).
- W. Nelson Francis, 91, American author, linguist and university professor, scholar of the English language.
- Alex Givvons, 88, Welsh rugby footballer.
- June Jordan, 65, Caribbean-American poet, essayist and activist, breast cancer.

=== 15 ===
- Said Belqola, 45, Moroccan referee of the 1998 FIFA World Cup final, cancer.
- Silas Bissell, 60, American activist and member of The Weatherman, brain cancer.
- Mutal Burhonov, 86, Soviet/Uzbek composer.
- Choi Hong-hi, 83, South Korean Army general and martial artist, purported "father of Taekwon-Do", cancer.
- Béla Juhász, 81, Hungarian Olympic long-distance runner (1952).
- Big Mello, 33, American rapper from Houston, Texas, traffic collision.
- Hideo Murota, 64, Japanese actor.
- Dick White, 70, English football player.
- Robert Whitehead, 86, Canadian theatre producer, winner of four Tony Awards.

=== 16 ===
- Louis Giguère, 90, Canadian politician.
- Barbara Goalen, 81, British model.
- Kiço Ngjela, 82, Albanian politician.
- Harry Oakman, 96, Australian horticulturalist and writer.

=== 17 ===
- Bill Adair, 89, American baseball manager and coach (Milwaukee/Atlanta Braves, Chicago White Sox, Montreal Expos).
- Louis George Alexander, 70, British teacher and author (New Concept English), a prolific writer of English-language text books.
- Stein Ove Berg, 53, Norwegian singer, songwriter, and journalist.
- J. Carter Brown, 67, American director of the National Gallery of Art from 1969 to 1992, multiple myeloma.
- Willie Davenport, 59, American Olympic hurdler and bobsledder (1964, 1968, 1972, 1976, 1980), heart attack.
- John C. Davies II, 82, American politician (U.S. Representative for New York's 35th congressional district).
- Dobri Dzhurov, 86, Bulgarian politician and military leader.
- Francisco Escudero, 89, Basque composer.
- Zora Kolínska, 60, Slovak actress, singer, and presenter.
- Yuri Korneev, 65, Soviet/Russian basketball player and Olympian (1960, 1964).
- Roger Mackay, 46, Australian golfer, lymphoma.
- John Oladipo Oladitan, 71, Nigerian athlete and Olympian (1960).
- Antony C. Sutton, 77, British-American writer, economist, and academic.
- Fritz Walter, 81, German football player, captain of 1954 World Cup winners.

=== 18 ===
- Nancy Addison, 54, American soap actress, cancer.
- Naseem Banu, 85, Indian actress.
- Jack Buck, 77, American sportscaster, best known for announcing MLB games of the St. Louis Cardinals, Parkinson's disease.
- Nilima Ibrahim, 81, Bangladeshi writer.
- Jack Jenkins, 59, American baseball player (Washington Senators, Los Angeles Dodgers).
- Pentti Siltaloppi, 84, Finnish runner and Olympian (1948).
- Walter Villa, 58, Italian four-time Grand Prix motorcycle road racing world champion, heart attack.

=== 19 ===
- Ross Carter, 88, American gridiron football player (University of Oregon, Chicago Cardinals).
- Cavin Councilor, 38, American stock car racing driver, plane crash.
- Margaret Johnston, 87, Australian-British actress.
- Robert W. Lenski, 76, American screenwriter.
- Don Luft, 72, American football player (Philadelphia Eagles).
- Pascal Mazzotti, 78, French actor (The King and the Mockingbird).
- Dmitry Oboznenko, 71, Soviet Russian painter and graphic artist.
- Count Flemming of Rosenborg, 80, Danish prince.
- Johnny Strzykalski, 80, American gridiron football player (San Francisco 49ers).
- N. F. Varghese, 53, Indian actor.

=== 20 ===
- Carlos Badion, 66, Filipino basketball player and Olympian (1956, 1960), heart attack.
- Heinz Bigler, 76, Swiss football player.
- Erwin Chargaff, 96, Austro-Hungarian biochemist.
- Cecil Cole, 82, American baseball player.
- Salvador Correa, 86, Argentine Olympic bobsledder (1948).
- Fred Drake, 44, American musician, lung cancer.
- Timothy Findley, 71, Canadian author (The Wars, Headhunter, Pilgrim, Elizabeth Rex).
- Irene MacDonald, 68, Canadian athlete, sports executive, broadcaster, and Olympian (1956, 1960).
- Ross MacKenzie, 55, Canadian sprinter and Olympian (1968).
- Tinus Osendarp, 86, Dutch sprinter and Olympian (1936).
- Enrique Regüeiferos, 53, Cuban boxer and Olympian (1968, 1972).
- Sa'id Akhtar Rizvi, 75, Indian scholar.
- Larry Rucchin, 35, Canadian-Italian ice hockey player and Olympian (1998).
- Stanisław Trepczyński, 78, Polish diplomat.
- John Wirth, 66, American professor and historian of Latin American studies.

=== 21 ===
- Sidney Armus, 77, American actor, cancer.
- Matt Dennis, 88, American singer, pianist and composer ("Angel Eyes", "Everything Happens to Me", "Violets for Your Furs").
- Henry Keith, Baron Keith of Kinkel, 80, British jurist.
- Willy Klopfenstein, 81, Swiss Olympic ski jumper (1948).
- Wladimiro Panizza, 57, Italian road bicycle racer.
- Kurt Seibt, 94, East German politician.
- Berl Senofsky, 76, American classical violinist and teacher, lung disease.
- Clifford Possum Tjapaltjarri, 70, Australian painter.

=== 22 ===
- Chang Cheh, 79, Hong Kong film director, pneumonia.
- David O. Cooke, 81, American civil servant, Director of Administration and Management at the U.S. Department of Defense.
- Justin Whitlock Dart, Jr., 71, American activist and advocate for people with disabilities.
- Conrad Hansen, 95, German pianist and a piano teacher.
- Darryl Kile, 33, Major League Baseball player (Houston Astros, Colorado Rockies, St. Louis Cardinals), heart attack.
- Ron Kline, 70, American baseball player (Pittsburgh Pirates, Detroit Tigers, Washington Senators).
- Eppie Lederer, 83, American media celebrity and advice columnist known by her pen name Ann Landers, multiple myeloma.
- Helen Nielsen, 83, American author and screen writer (Perry Mason, Alfred Hitchcock Presents).
- Yoshio Okada, 75, Japanese football player.
- Raul Uhl, 95, Hungarian Olympic sailor (1928).
- Cho Yoon-ok, 62, South Korean football player, manager, and Olympian (1964).

=== 23 ===
- Lionel Bernstein, 82, South African anti-apartheid activist and political prisoner.
- Otto Djaya, 85, Indonesian painter
- Fadzil Noor, 63, Malaysian politician and religious teacher, complications following heart bypass surgery.
- Pat Preston, 81, American football player (Chicago Bears).
- Carlo Savina, 82, Italian composer and conductor.
- Alice Stewart, 95, British physician and epidemiologist.

=== 24 ===
- Larry Alcala, 75, Filipino editorial cartoonist and illustrator.
- Pedro Alcázar, 26, Panamanian boxer, injuries sustained during title fight.
- Marcelle Bühler, 88, Swiss Olympic alpine skier (1936).
- Robert Dorfman, 85, American economist.
- Doreen Fernandez, 67, Filipino writer, teacher, cultural historian, food critic and scholar.
- Bernard Longpré, 65, Canadian director and animator.
- Miles Fitzalan-Howard, 17th Duke of Norfolk, 86, 17th Duke of Norfolk.
- Frank Ripploh, 52, German actor, film director, and author, cancer.
- June Schofield, 76, American baseball player.
- Nik Stuart, 74, British gymanst and Olympian (1956, 1960).
- Pierre Werner, 88, Prime Minister of Luxembourg (1959–1974, 1979–1984), considered the "father of the euro".

=== 25 ===
- Syed Ali Ahsan, 82, Bangladeshi poet, writer and academic.
- Joe Antolick, 86, American baseball player (Philadelphia Phillies).
- Gordon Park Baker, 64, American philosopher, focussing on the writings of Ludwig Wittgenstein.
- Turhan Baytop, 82, Turkish botanist and pharmacist.
- Jean Corbeil, 68, Canadian politician (Minister of Labour, Minister of Transport, member of Parliament).
- Derrek Dickey, 51, American basketball player and sportscaster (Cincinnati, Golden State Warriors, Chicago Bulls), heart attack.
- Norman Holroyd, 88, British Olympic weightlifter (1936).
- Bruce Ryan, 80, Australian rugby league footballer.

=== 26 ===
- Barbara G. Adams, 57, British egyptologist, cancer.
- Humaira Begum, 83, Afghan royal as the last queen consort of Afghanistan, heart failure.
- Jay Berwanger, 88, American college football player (Chicago Maroons), and first Heisman recipient.
- Arnold Brown, 88, British General of the Salvation Army.
- Donald A. Bullough, 74, British historian and author.
- Dolores Gray, 78, American actress and singer, heart attack.
- Martti Ketelä, 57, Finnish Olympic modern pentathlete (1968, 1972).
- Henry Jepson Latham, 93, American attorney, politician, and jurist.
- Raoul Rémy, 82, French road bicycle racer.
- Dermot Walsh, 77, Irish actor (Richard the Lionheart, Sea of Sand, The Challenge).
- Philip Whalen, 78, American Beat Generation poet and Zen Buddhist priest.
- Turgut Özatay, 74, Turkish film actor, lung cancer.

=== 27 ===
- Qu Bo, 79, Chinese novelist.
- Charles Frederick Carter, 82, British economist and academic administrator.
- John Entwistle, 57, English bassist (The Who), heart attack.
- Ralph Erickson, 100, American baseball player (Pittsburgh Pirates).
- Richard Evonitz, 38, American serial killer, kidnapper, and rapist, suicide by gunshot.
- Muharram Fouad, 68, Egyptian actor and singer, starred in Hassan and Nayima with co-star Soad Hosny.
- Russ Freeman, 76, American bebop and jazz pianist and songwriter.
- Robert L. J. Long, 82, American admiral.
- Ezio Mantelli, 78, Italian Olympic basketball player (1948).
- Georgi Sokolov, 60, Bulgarian football player.
- Timothy White, 50, American rock music journalist and editor (Crawdaddy!, Rolling Stone, Billboard), heart attack.

=== 28 ===
- Anatoly Akimov, 54, Soviet Olympic water polo player (1972).
- William Dufty, 86, American writer, musician, and activist (Lady Sings the Blues, Sugar Blues), cancer.
- Doug Elmore, 62, American professional football player (Ole Miss, Washington Redskins).
- Władysław Grotyński, 56, Polish footballer.
- François Périer, 82, French actor, heart attack.

=== 29 ===
- Terry Bourke, 62, Australian screenwriter, producer and director (Spyforce, Night of Fear, The Tourist).
- Rosemary Clooney, 74, American singer and actress ("Come On-a My House", "Hey There", "This Ole House"), lung cancer.
- Ole-Johan Dahl, 70, Norwegian computer scientist, considered one of the fathers of object-oriented programming.
- Alfred Dregger, 81, German politician and a leader of the Christian Democratic Union (CDU).
- Obby Kapita, 47, Zambian football player and coach, colorectal cancer.
- Roger Lévêque, 81, French road racing cyclist from 1946 to 1953.
- William Edward Ozzard, 87, American politician.
- Jaime Brocal Remohi, 66, Spanish comic book artist.
- Jan Tomasz Zamoyski, 90, Polish political activist, aristocrat and member of anti-Nazi underground resistance.

=== 30 ===
- Claude Berge, 76, French mathematician.
- Hermann Braun, 77, German Olympic figure skater (1952).
- Josef Buršík, 90, Czech resistance fighter, dissident, and political prisoner.
- W. Maxwell Cowan, 70, South African neurobiologist.
- Pete Gray, 87, American one-armed baseball player (St. Louis Browns).
- Nikolay Haytov, 82, Bulgarian fiction writer, playwright, and publicist, cancer.
- George Roman, 76, American football player (Boston Yanks, New York Bulldogs, New York Giants).
- Raúl Sánchez, 71, Cuban-American baseball player (Washington Senators, Cincinnati Redlegs/Reds).
- Roberto Villa, 86, Italian actor (The Fornaretto of Venice), pancreatitis.
- Wilmore Williams, 84, American baseball player.
- Dave Wilson, 69, American television director (Saturday Night Live), aortic aneurysm.
- Chico Xavier, 92, Brazilian spiritual medium and author, acute heart attack.
