= Latvian Cultural Canon =

National cultural canon of Latvia

The Latvian Cultural Canon (Latvian: Latvijas kultūras kanons) is a selection of works of art and other elements of Latvia's cultural heritage listed by the Latvian Ministry of Culture. It covers seven cultural fields: architecture and design, cinema, literature, music, the performing arts, folk traditions and visual arts. Landscapes form a further category.

== History ==
Latvia's Ministry of Culture began work on the canon in late 2007. Māra Lāce, director of the Latvian National Museum of Art, oversaw the project. Separate groups of experts selected the entries for each field. The Danish and Dutch canons served as models. The original selection contained 99 entries, and further additions were envisaged.

In a 2009 article for LV portāls, Inese Matisāne suggested using the canon to teach Latvian cultural and art history. In 2013, the Saeima's Social Cohesion Committee criticised the lack of common selection criteria and the limited range of experts involved. It called for public participation in revising the canon.

Eight Latvian landscapes were added in June 2021.

== Entries ==
The canon includes the following entries.

=== Architecture and design ===
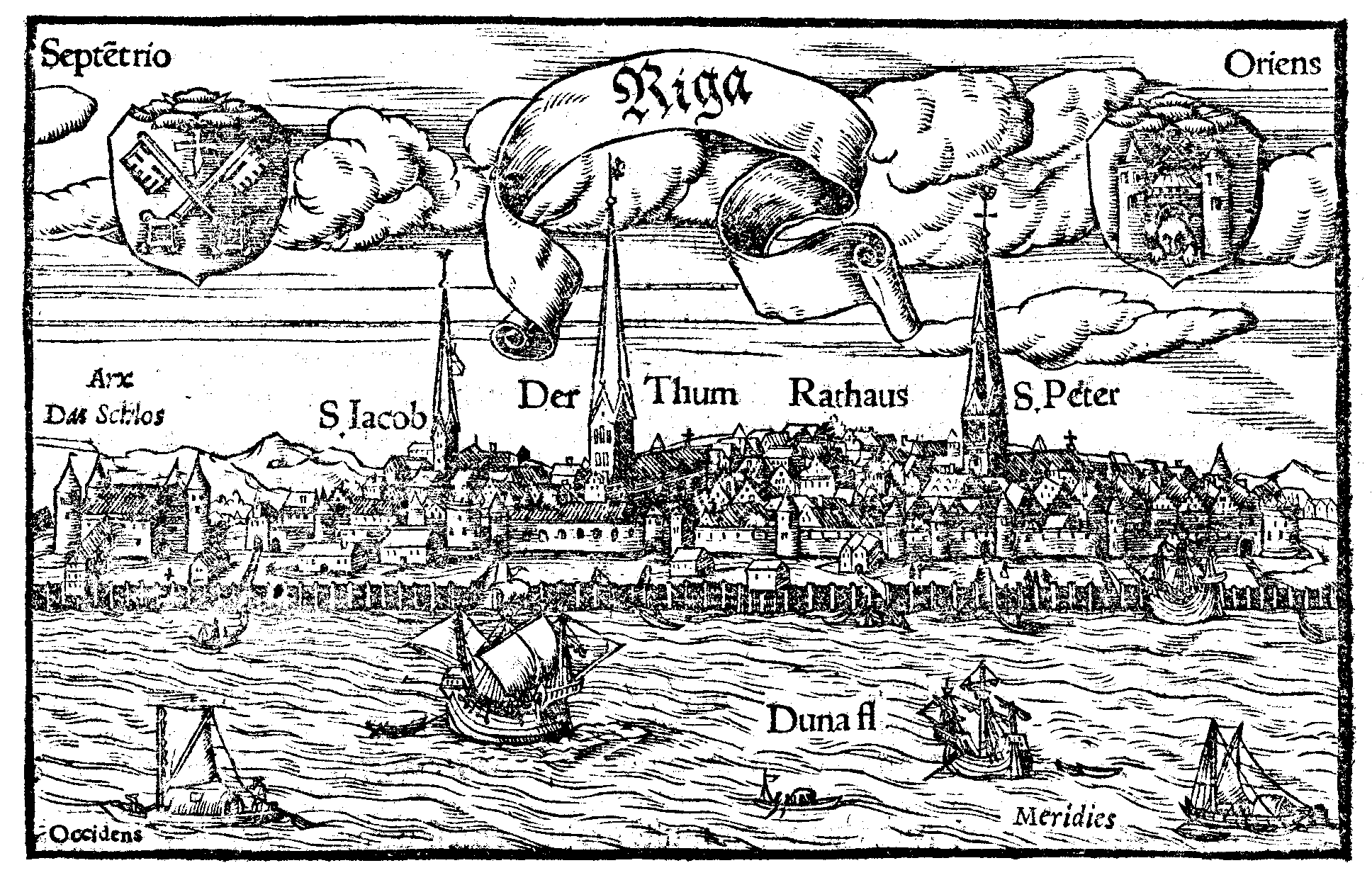
Riga's skyline in a woodcut published in 1575

- The Latvian farmstead and its components, from the 16th to the 21st century.
- The skyline of Old Riga, from the 13th to the 21st century.
- Rundāle Palace (1736-1740 and 1763-1768).
- Christoph Haberland (1750-1803).
- Reinhold Schmeling (1840-1917).
- Atis Ķeniņš's Gymnasium at 15/17 Tērbatas Street, Riga (1905).
- Wooden buildings in Riga, including Ķīpsala, Kalnciema Street and Mūrnieku Street, from the 18th to the 21st century.
- Dzintari Concert Hall (1936, 1959, 2006 and 2015).
- The Salaspils Memorial (1967).
- The Dailes Theatre building (1959-1976).
- Andris Kronbergs (born 1951).
- Gunnar Birkerts (1925-2017).
- The traditional stulpiņš seat, from the 17th to the 21st century.
- The interior of the Ambassadors' Accreditation Hall in Riga Castle (1923-1929).
- The Minox camera (1936-1937).
- The Riga-12 moped (1973-1979).
- Latvian posters of the 1970s and 1980s.
- Latvian currency.

=== Cinema ===
- Lāčplēsis (1930).
- Baltie zvani (1961).
- Purva bridējs (1966).
- Elpojiet dziļi..., also known as Četri balti krekli (1967).
- Nāves ēnā (1971).
- Ceplis (1972).
- Ābols upē (1974).
- Vecāks par desmit minūtēm (1978).
- Vanadziņš (1978).
- Limuzīns Jāņu nakts krāsā (1981).
- Vai viegli būt jaunam? (1986).
- Šķērsiela (1988).

=== Literature ===
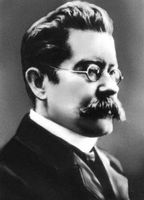
Rūdolfs Blaumanis

- Eriks Ādamsons (1907-1946): Smalkās kaites (1937).
- Vizma Belševica (1931-2005): Gadu gredzeni (1969), Dzeltu laiks (1987) and the Bille trilogy (1995-1999).
- The poetry of Uldis Bērziņš (1944-2021).
- Rūdolfs Blaumanis (1863-1908): his short stories and Indrāni (1904).
- Aleksandrs Čaks (1901-1950): Mana paradīze (1932) and Mūžības skartie (1937-1939).
- Regīna Ezera (1930-2002): Zemdegas (1977).
- Jānis Jaunsudrabiņš (1877-1962): Baltā grāmata (1914-1921) and Aija (1911-1925).
- Reinis Kaudzīte (1839-1920) and Matīss Kaudzīte (1848-1926): Mērnieku laiki (1879).
- Kārlis Mīlenbahs (1853-1916): his dictionary of the Latvian language.
- Jānis Poruks (1871-1911): Pērļu zvejnieks (1895).
- Rainis (1865-1929): Gals un sākums (1912) and Uguns un nakts (1905).
- Kārlis Skalbe (1879-1945): Ziemas pasakas (1913).
- Ojārs Vācietis (1933-1983): Si minors (1982).
- Imants Ziedonis (1933-2013): Es ieeju sevī (1968), Taureņu uzbrukums (1988) and the first two volumes of Epifānijas (1971-1974).

=== Music ===
- Emīls Dārziņš (1875-1910): Melanholiskais valsis for symphony orchestra (1904).
- Lūcija Garūta (1902-1977): Dievs, Tava zeme deg!, a cantata for tenor, baritone, choir and organ (1943).
- The symphonies of Jānis Ivanovs (1906-1983), composed from 1933 to 1983.
- Andrejs Jurjāns (1856-1922): Pūt, vējiņi, a song for mixed choir (1884).
- The solo songs of Alfrēds Kalniņš (1879-1951), composed from 1900 to 1949.
- Imants Kalniņš (born 1941): Symphony No. 4 (1973).
- Jānis Mediņš (1890-1966): the opera Uguns un nakts (1913-1919).
- Emilis Melngailis (1874-1954): Jāņuvakars, a song for mixed choir (1926).
- Johann Gottfried Müthel (1728-1788).
- The songs of Raimonds Pauls (born 1936).
- Pēteris Vasks (born 1946): Musica dolorosa for string orchestra (1983).
- Jāzeps Vītols (1863-1948): Gaismas pils, a ballad for mixed choir (1899).

=== Performing arts ===
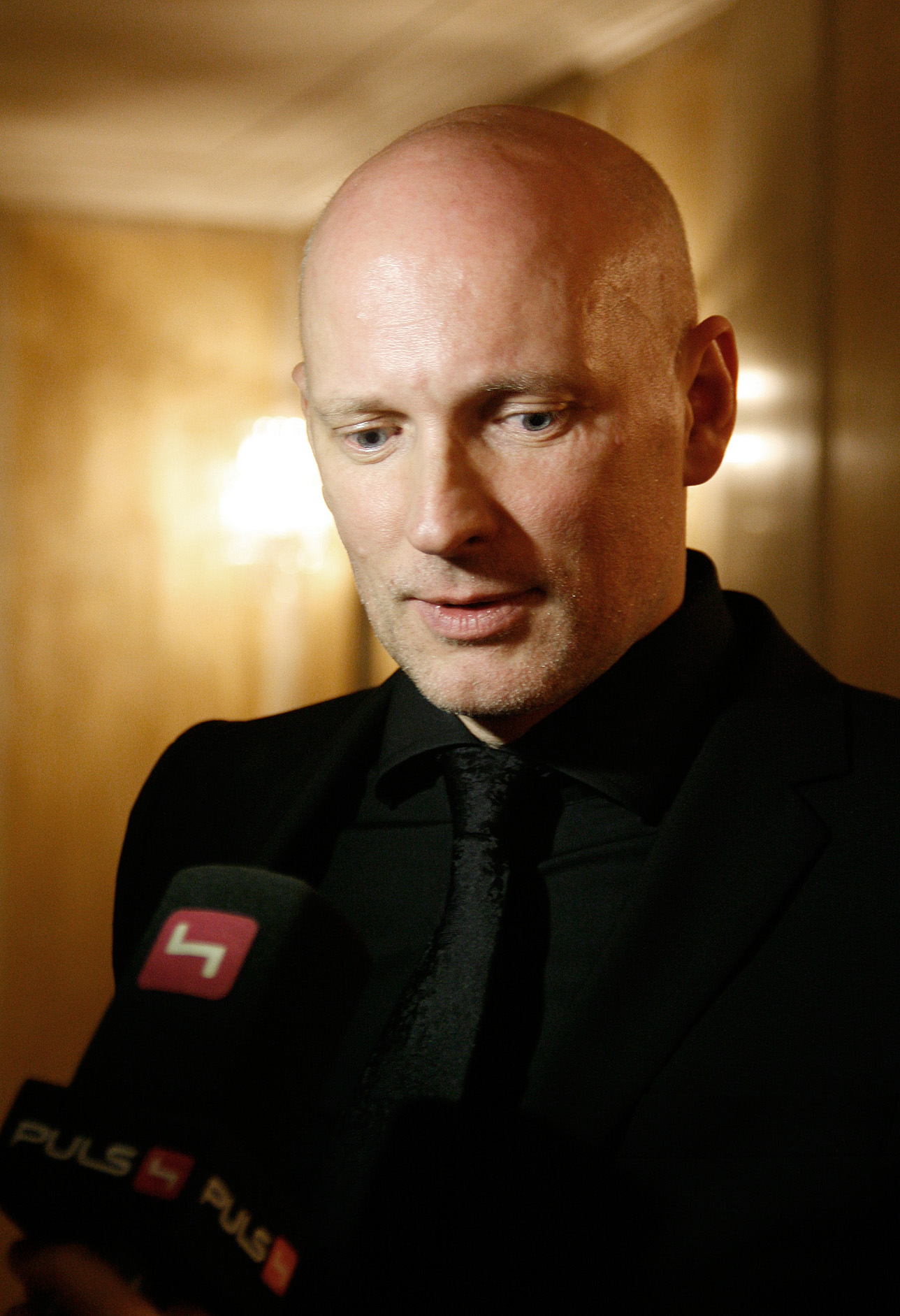
Alvis Hermanis

- The Dailes Theatre under Eduards Smiļģis, from 1920 to 1964.
- The Latvian National Theatre, then the Latvian SSR A. Upīts Academic Drama Theatre, under Alfrēds Jaunušans, from 1967 to 1981.
- Adolf Shapiro's Youth Theatre, from the 1960s to the 1980s.
- The New Riga Theatre under Alvis Hermanis, from 1993.
- Aleksis Mierlauks's production of Rainis's Uguns un nakts at the New Riga Theatre in 1911.
- Pēteris Pētersons's production of Aleksandrs Čaks's Spēlē, spēlmani at the Youth Theatre in 1972.
- Arnolds Liniņš's production of Henrik Ibsen's Brand at the Dailes Theatre in 1975.
- Oļģerts Kroders and his theatre of like-minded collaborators in the late 1960s and early 1970s.
- Pēteris Pētersons's poetry theatre in the 1960s and 1970s.
- Māra Ķimele's psychoanalytic theatre.
- The acting of Antra Liedskalniņa, marked by emotional involvement and spontaneity.
- The acting of Uldis Pūcītis, combining emotional involvement with intellectual interpretation of his roles.
- Riga Pantomime under Roberts Ligers in the late 1960s and the 1970s.
- Helēna Tangijeva-Birzniece's contribution to Latvian ballet.
- Aleksandrs Lembergs and Latvian ballet from the 1960s to the 1980s.

=== Folk traditions ===
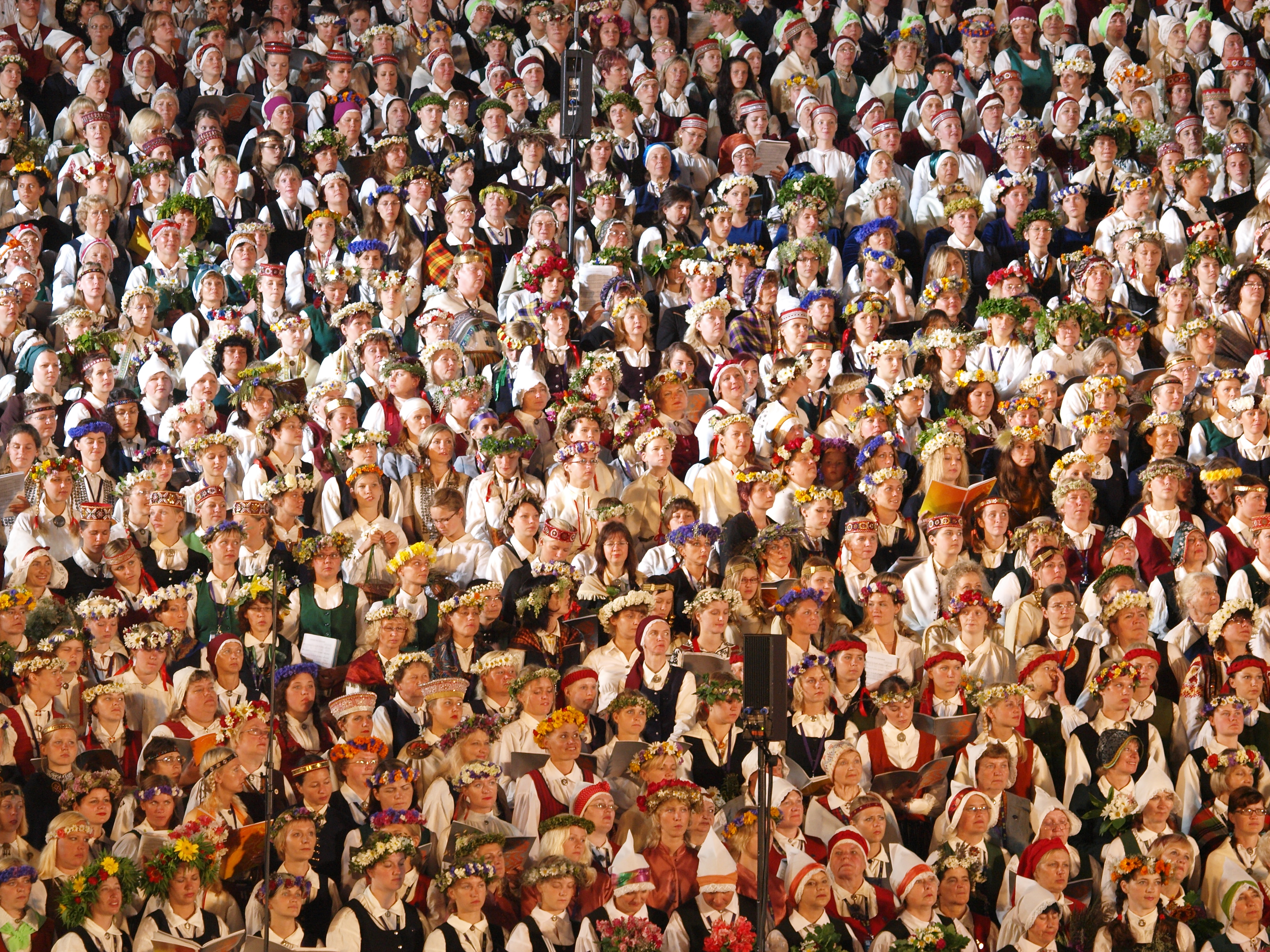
The massed choir at the Latvian Song Festival

- Latvian folk songs, or dainas.
- Recitative singing with a drone accompaniment.
- The kokle and kokle playing.
- Latvian folk costumes.
- The Lielvārde belt.
- The Latvian Song Festival.
- Rye bread.
- Latgalian pottery.
- Jāņi.
- The tradition of tending graves and cemeteries.
- May services at outdoor crosses and the Office of the Dead in Latgale and Selonia.
- The Suiti cultural space.
- Traditional Livonian culture.

=== Visual arts ===
- Nicolaus Söffrens the Younger (1662-1710): the altarpiece of St Anne's Church in Liepāja (1697).
- Janis Rozentāls (1866-1916): Pēc dievkalpojuma (No baznīcas) (1894).
- Vilhelms Purvītis (1872-1945): the landscapes Pavasara ūdeņi (Maestoso) (c. 1910), Ziema (c. 1908) and Pavasarī (Ziedonis) (1933-1934).
- Johann Walter (1869-1932): Peldētāji zēni (c. 1900).
- Jānis Jaunsudrabiņš (1877-1962): the illustrations for his Baltā grāmata (1914).
- Jēkabs Kazaks (1895-1920): Bēgļi (1917).
- Jāzeps Grosvalds (1891-1920): his riflemen series (1916-1917).
- Teodors Zaļkalns (1876-1972): Sēdošā māmiņa (1916-1923).
- Kārlis Zāle (1888-1942): his monumental sculpture, including the Brothers' Cemetery ensemble (1924-1936) and the Freedom Monument (1931-1935).
- Porcelain from the Baltars workshop (1925-1928).
- Niklāvs Strunke (1894-1966): Cilvēks, kas ieiet istabā (1927).
- Ģederts Eliass (1887-1975): Pie akas (c. 1935).
- Kārlis Padegs (1911-1940): the Sarkanie smiekli series (1930-1931).
- Boriss Bērziņš (1930-2002): Mākslinieks un modelis (1985).
- Egons Spuris (1931-1990): the photographic series Rīgas proletāriešu rajoni 19. gs. beigas, 20. gs. sākums ("Riga's proletarian districts in the late 19th and early 20th centuries"), made in the 1970s and 1980s.
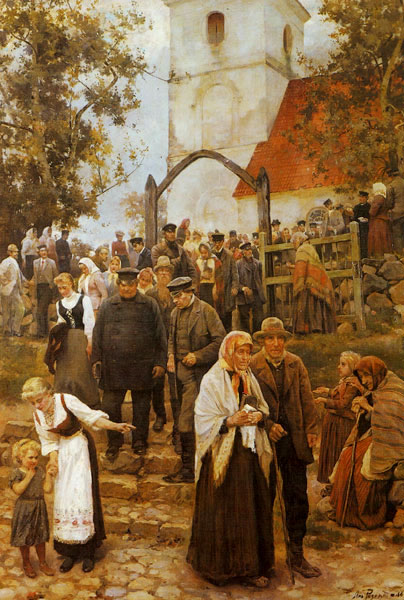
Janis Rozentāls, After Church (1894)

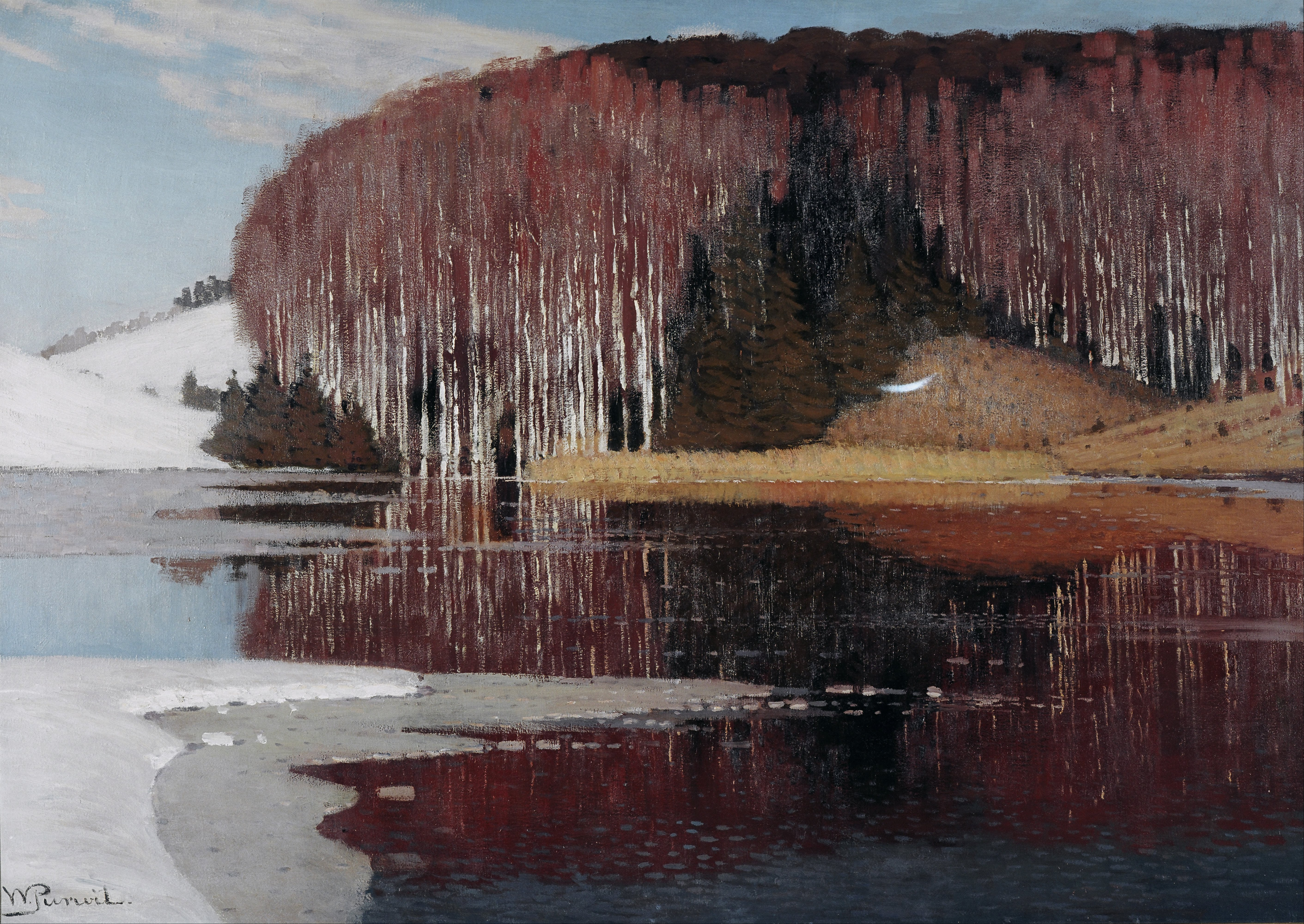
Vilhelms Purvītis, Spring Waters (Maestoso) (c. 1910)

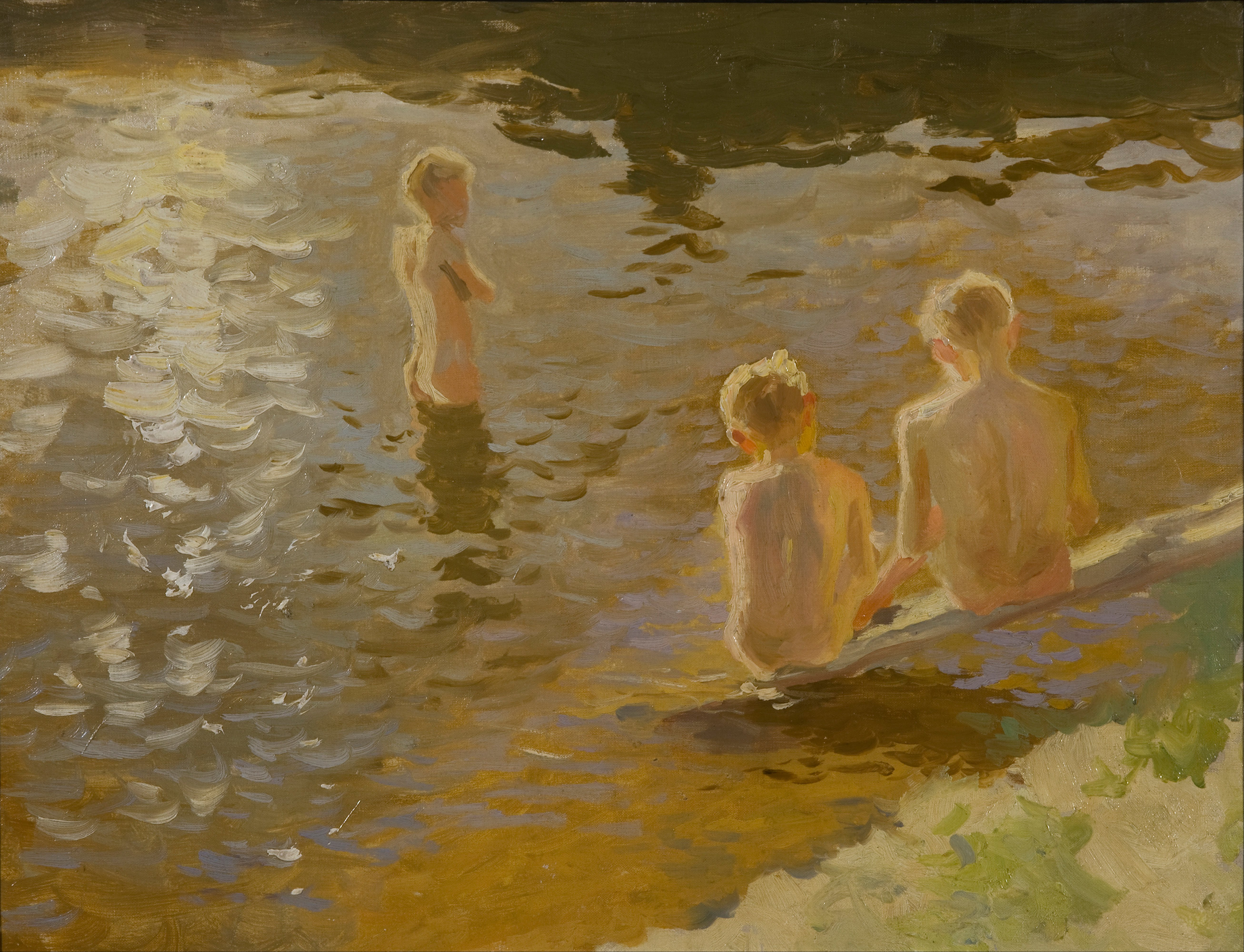
Johann Walter, Bathing Boys (c. 1900)

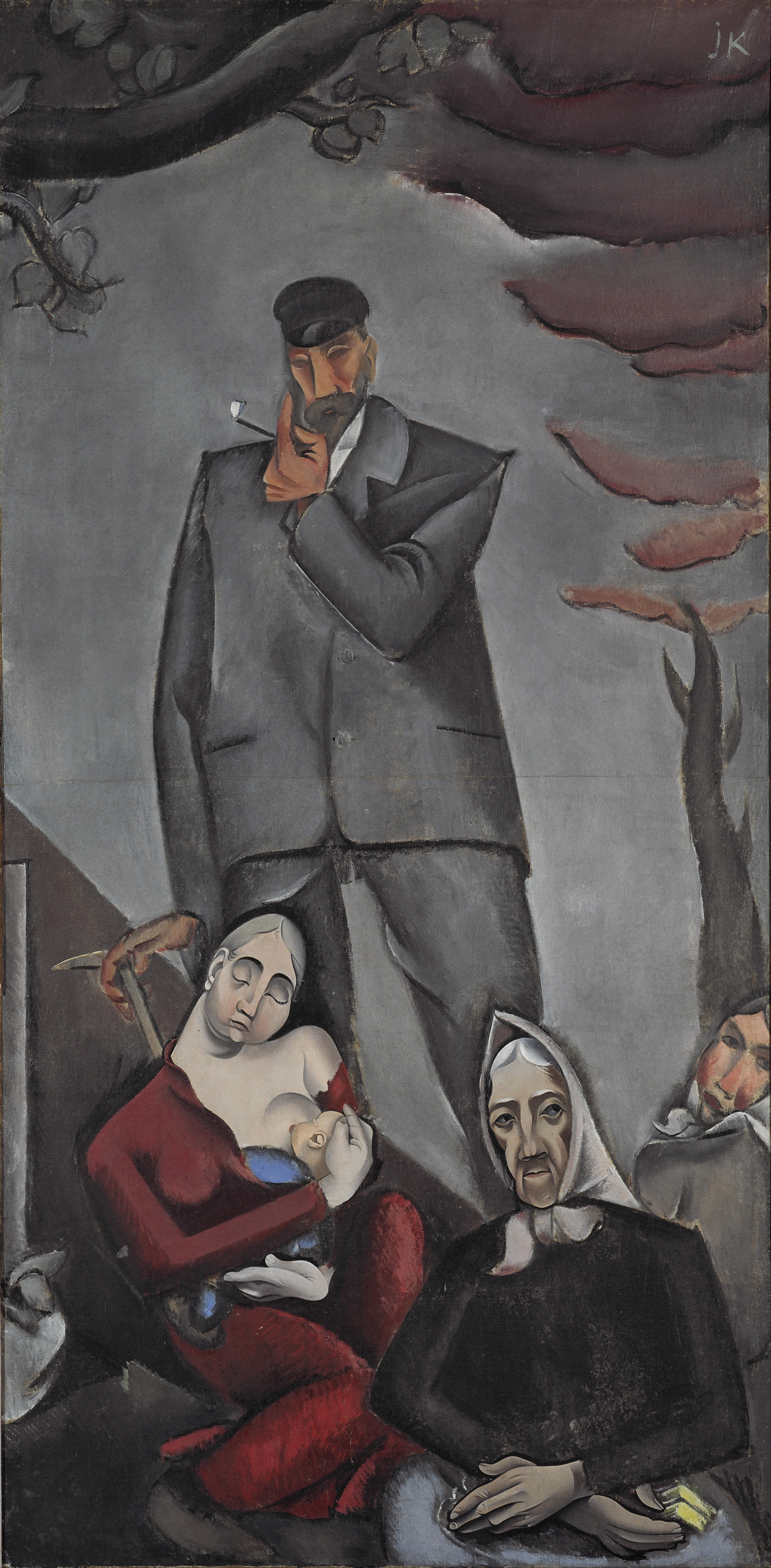
Jēkabs Kazaks, Refugees (1917)

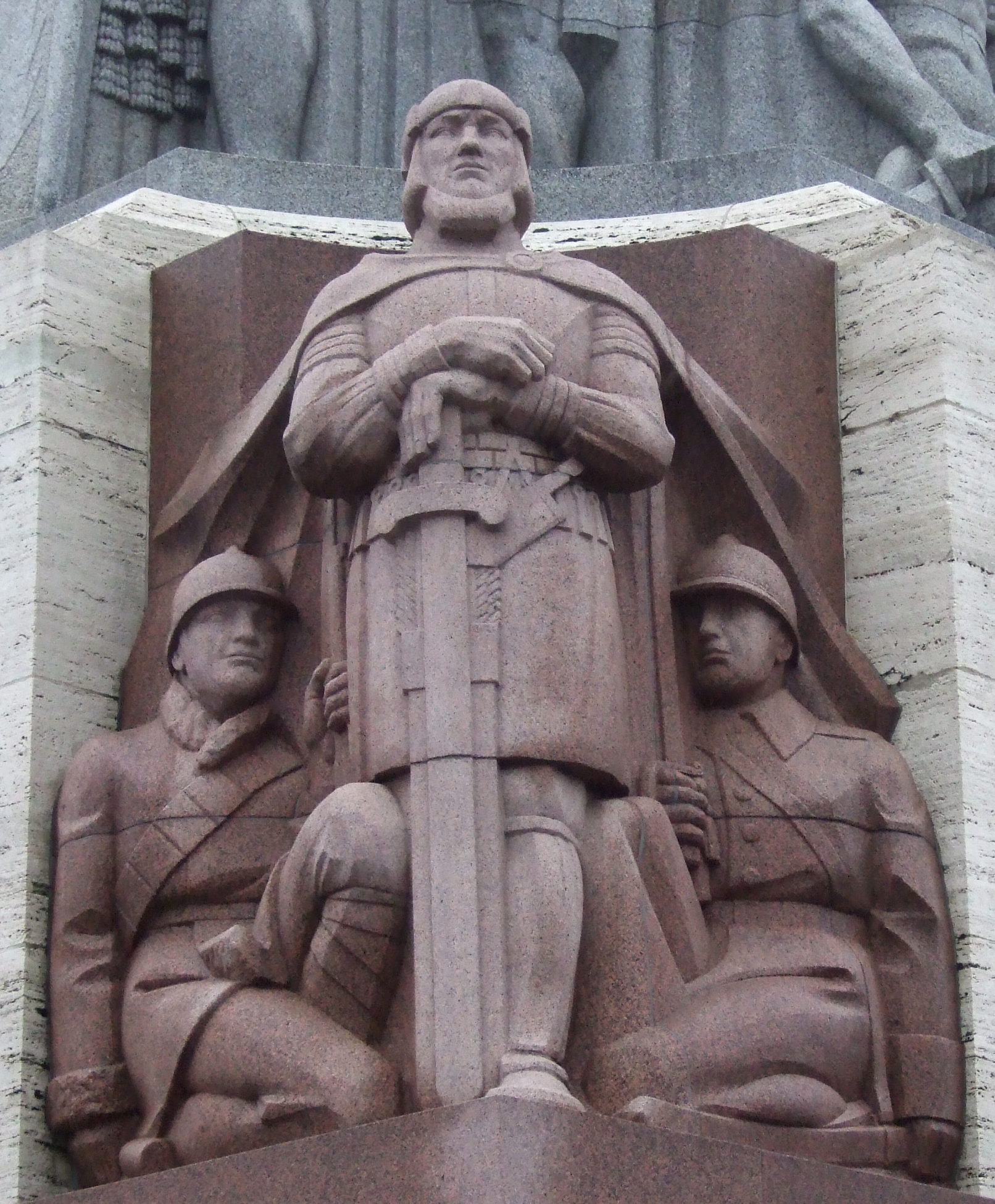
Kārlis Zāle, Guards of the Fatherland, a detail of the Freedom Monument

=== Landscapes ===
- The ancient Abava valley.
- The Daugava landscape.
- The Zemgale plain.
- The ancient Gauja valley.
- The lake landscape of Latgale.
- Latvian forests.
- The Latvian seacoast.
- The rolling hills of Vidzeme.
