= Walter Stoneman =

English photographer (1876–1958)

Walter Stoneman MBE FRGS FRPS
- Self-portrait, 1942
- Born: Walter Ernest Stoneman; 6 April 1876; Plymouth, Devon, England
- Died: 14 May 1958 (aged 82); Horley, Surrey, England
- Education: Plymouth College
- Occupation: Photographer
- Employer(s): Russell & Sons
- Known for: Providing c. 7,000 portrait photographs to the National Portrait Gallery
- Spouse: Kathleen Irene (m. 1915)
- Children: 1

Walter Ernest Stoneman MBE FRGS FRPS (6 April 1876 – 14 May 1958) was an English portrait photographer who is known for taking photographs for the National Portrait Gallery (NPG) in London. Starting in 1917, he started the National Photographic Record of the leading members of British society and photographed about seven thousand of them over the next forty years.

== Career as a photographer ==
Stoneman was born in Plymouth, Devon, on 6 April 1876, the second youngest of fourteen children of Edwin Stoneman, who ran a wholesale grocer's business. He went to school at Plymouth College, which he left when he was fifteen to embark on a career as a photographer. He later had his own photographic business in Plymouth, Heath and Stoneman Ltd., but most of his career was spent working for the London firm of J. Russell & Sons, which he had joined as a junior photographer by 1897.

In June 1897, he was the only one of fourteen photographers working for J. Russell & Sons who succeeded in taking four pictures of Queen Victoria in her golden state landau on the occasion of her diamond jubilee. Working for J. Russell & Sons, he took numerous photographs of royalty, aristocracy, members of high society and other prominent individuals. By 1913 he became managing director of the firm, and after the death of John Lemmon Russell in 1915 he ran the company. In October 1932 it was absorbed into Elliott & Fry. In 1961, Walter Bird purchased Russell & Sons and became its leading photographer; he sold the company to Godfrey Argent in 1967.

In 1948, Stoneman was made a Member of the Order of the British Empire (MBE) for services to photography. He continued working as a photographer until his death in 1958.

Stoneman was a fellow of both the Royal Photographic Society and the Royal Geographical Society, as well as vice-president of the London Devonian Association.

== Personal life ==
He was also a lay preacher in the Congregational Church. He and his wife, Kathleen, had one son.

== National Photographic Record ==
In 1917, in collaboration with the National Portrait Gallery, Stoneman launched a project to build a National Photographic Record (NPR) of all prominent members of British society. Over the next 41 years Stoneman took and printed postcard-sized pictures of some 7,000 individuals in his studio, between 100 and 200 a year, and provided them to NPG.

The project focussed on political and military figures, and sitters included five monarchs, nine prime ministers, twelve lord chancellors, eighty admirals and one hundred generals. Sitters did not pay for the privilege of being photographed by Stoneman, but were photographed free at the studios of J. Russell & Sons at Baker Street, and so Stoneman was not directly remunerated for producing the photographs.

The original idea of Stoneman was for storing visual records rather than distributing them. However, parts of the collection were occasionally exhibited to the public, for example at the Royal Photographic Society in 1922 and 1924, at the studios of J. Russell & Sons in Baker Street in 1931, and at Foyles Art Gallery in 1943. The fees collected from such exhibitions and from reproductions of the photographs were shared between Stoneman and the NPG. These exhibitions also helped boost his reputation and increase his clientele.

Up until his death Stoneman had been the sole official photographer for the NPR. After his death, the NPR project continued with Walter Bird as photographer until 1967, when he was succeeded by Godfrey Argent who continued the project until it was stopped in 1970. By then, the collections counted more than 10,000 photographs.

== Gallery ==
King George V, c. 1916

Former Liberal prime minister H. H. Asquith, 1917

Future Conservative prime minister Stanley Baldwin, 1920

Former Conservative prime minister Arthur Balfour, 1921

Liberal prime minister David Lloyd George, 1921

Future king George VI, 1921

Future Conservative prime minister Neville Chamberlain, 1921

Conservative prime minister Bonar Law, 1923

Future Labour prime minister Ramsay MacDonald, 1923

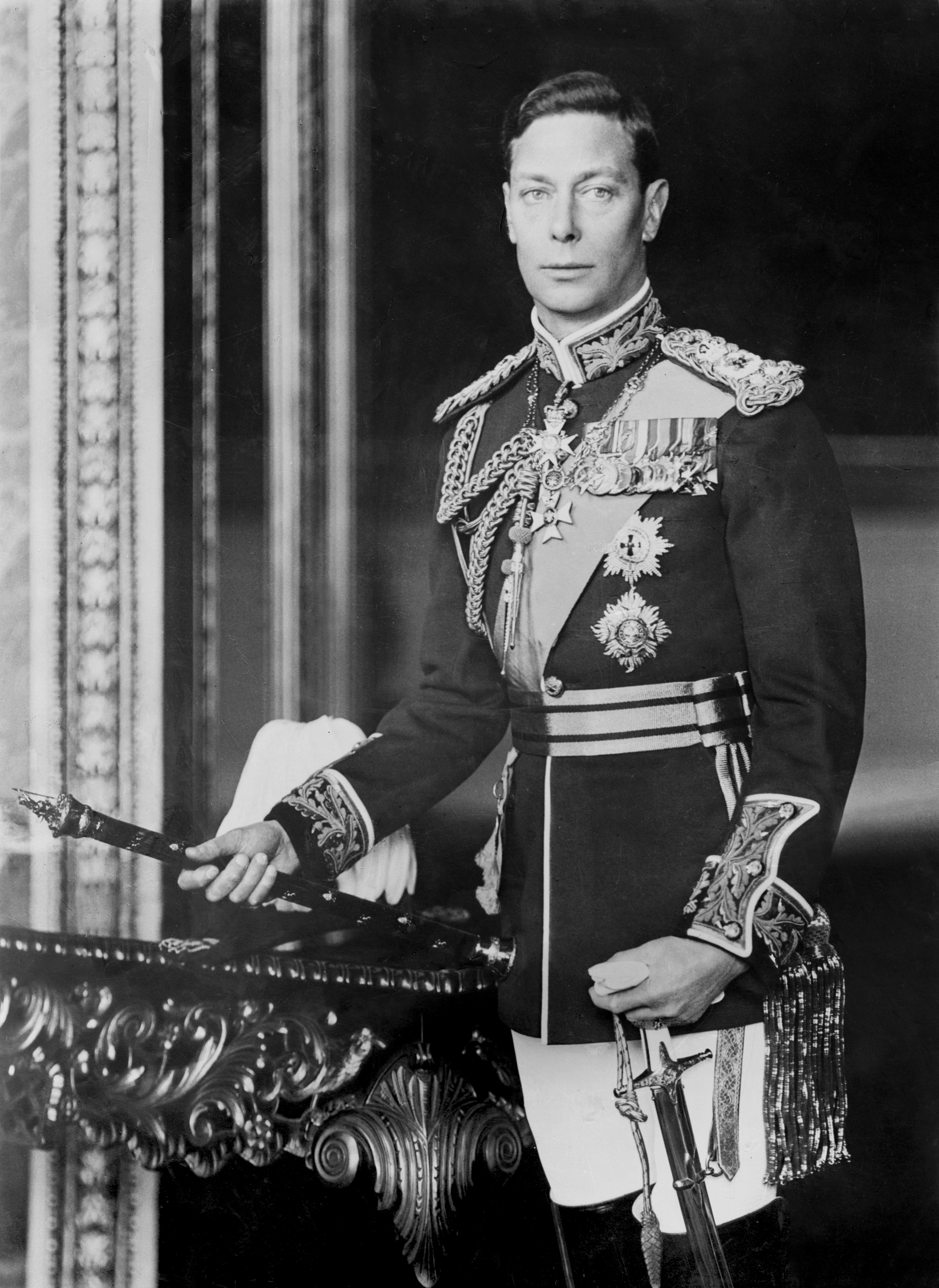
King George VI, 1938

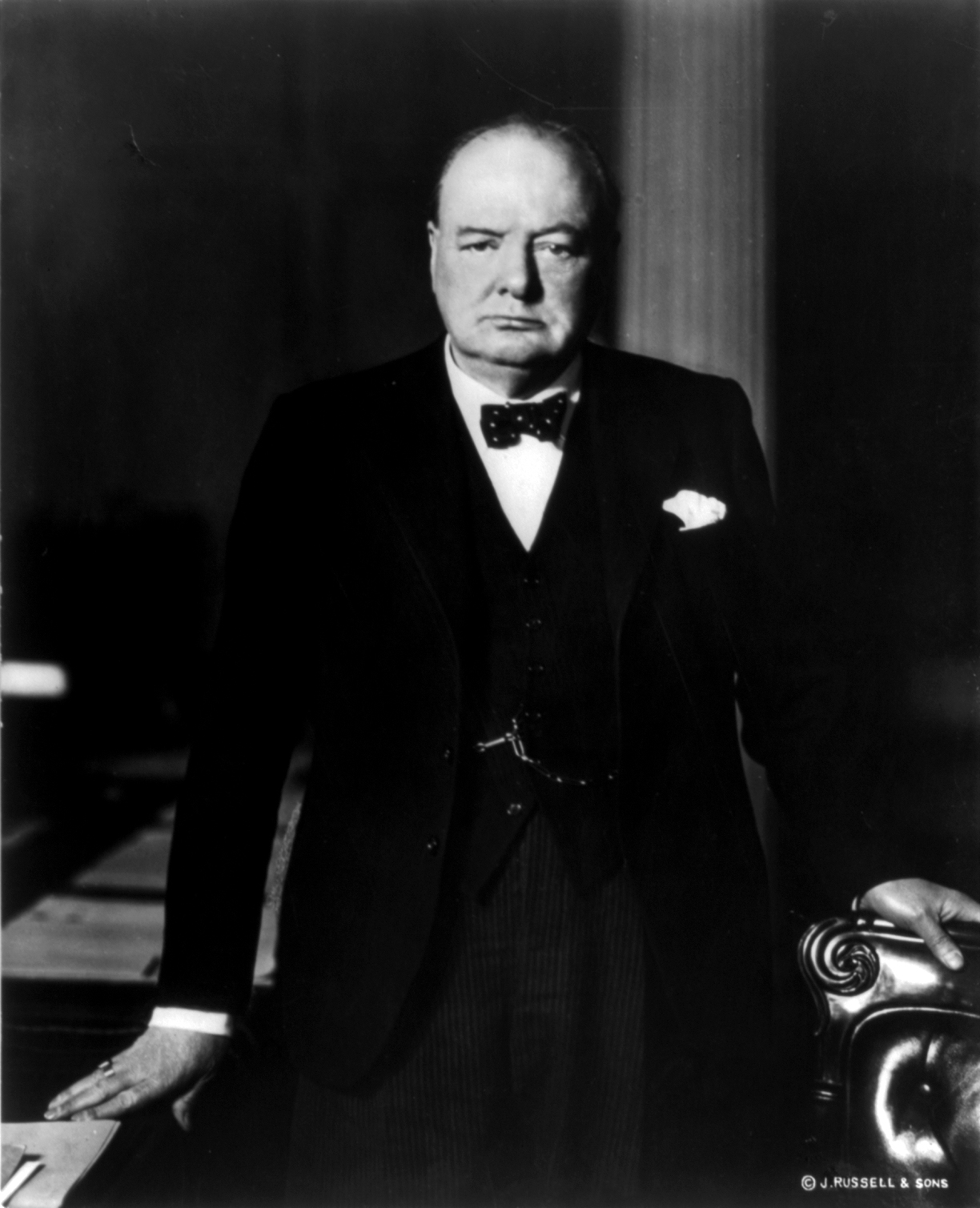
Conservative prime minister Winston Churchill, 1941

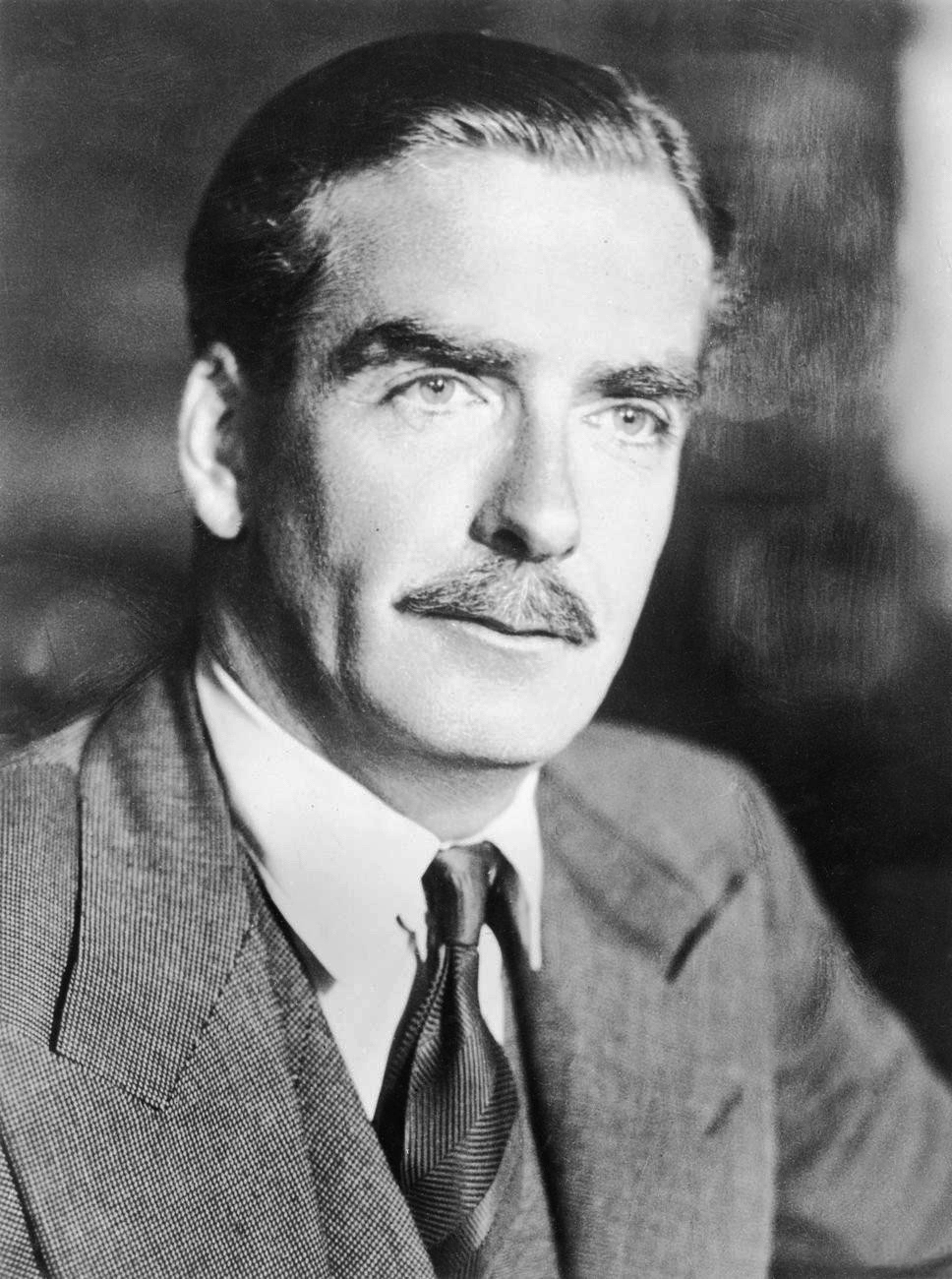
Future Conservative prime minister Anthony Eden, early 1940s
