= Na Taku =

Belarusian folk band

NA TAKU (капэля НА ТАКУ)
- Origin: Minsk, Belarus
- Genres: Traditional music
- Years active: 2008–present
- Members: Alaksiej Krukoŭski; Taciana Hrynievič-Matafonava; Raman Jaraš; Jaŭhien Baryšnikaŭ; Darja Zujeva
- Past members: Źmicier Sidarovič; Ihar Doŭhi; Alaksiej "Lesavik"

Na Taku (Belarusian: На таку́) is a Belarusian traditional music band.

== History ==
In 2008 singer and piper Źmicier Sidarovič (2 October 1965 – 17 May 2014) started a band which organised traditional dancing parties in the Minsk café "Žar-Ptuška". He continued to perform at Žar-Ptuška until 2011, later moving to other establishments. Sidarovič was the leader of mid-1990s Belarusian band Kamiełot. In 1991 he started the Kamiełot band. In 2000 Sidarovič together with bands Stary Olsa and Contredanse recorded an album Vir (released in 2001). In 2008 he started the Na Taku band, which organised traditional dancing parties in Žar-Ptuška café (Minsk) until 2011 and then in other places.

One of the members, Ramán Járaš, was born in May 1978 in Brahin District, Homiel Voblaść. After April 1986 his family moved twice further from Chernobil and once moved back. Started playing guitar at university. Learned singing together with his friends in "Kudźmień" singing group and from traditional singers during ethnographic expeditions. Was inspired to start playing harmonica by Bob Dylan. Poetry by Latvian writer Jānis Jaunsudrabiņš was used as the lyrics. All arrangements and translations were made by Raman himself. He also played all musical parts. Jaunsudrabiņš's painting and Latvian language were used to design the cover.

After Sidarovič's death, the band has continued to exist. The band frequently tours neighbouring countries, such as Latvia, Lithuania, Poland and Ukraine.

== Name ==
"Na taku" literally means "On the threshing floor" in Belarusian and refers to the folk tradition to arrange dance parties on the vacant threshing floor (cf. "barn dance").

== Repertoire ==
The band plays old everyday dances which originate both from villages and towns. While the majority of dances are of Belarusian origin, the band plays Lithuanian, Latvian, Estonian, Ukrainian, Polish, Finnish, Austrian, Breton and French dances as well. On the whole more than 100 different dances are performed by the band. Dances are included in the band's repertoire only if they are historically adopted to the rural culture and are well-integrated in tradition.

We refused to orient on medieval music, which is played by a number of bands, from the very beginning and chose an ethnographic dancing music style. I have no idea where 'medieval bands' take materials from. Perhaps they visit European festivals or search for music in the libraries. We can still talk to people, hear their songs. It happened so that someone in a village showed us a dance, and in a couple of weeks we were told that this person had died. It is weird to realize that the dance could have disappeared forever together with that person.

— Alaksiej Krukoŭski

Members of the band participate in ethnographic expeditions, adopt the traditional manner of playing from authentic musicians.

== Members ==
- Alaksiej Krukoŭski: accordion
- Taciana Hrynievič-Matafonava: violin
- Raman Jaraš: percussion, harmonica
- Jaŭhien Baryšnikaŭ: percussion, bagpipe
- Darja Zujeva: violin

=== Past members ===
- Źmicier Sidarovič: bagpipe
- Ihar Doŭhi: percussion
- Alaksiej "Lesavik": bagpipe, violin
