= Jean Straker =

- Born: Ethelred Jean Straker; 20 April 1913; London, England
- Died: 1984 (aged 70–71)
- Occupation: Photographer

Ethelred Jean Straker (20 April 1913 – 1984) was a British photographer and campaigner against censorship.

== Biography ==
Born in London, to a Russian émigré father, his mother was an English ballerina. After leaving school, he went to work in a film publicity office. Turning freelance, he ghostwrote articles for film and theatre magazines, which he illustrated with his photographs.

During the Second World War, he was a conscientious objector, and he combined his duties as an Air Raid Precautions (ARP) Warden with that of a surgical photographer for the British Ministry of Information.

He bought a studio in Soho Square in 1945 and set up a firm called the Photo Union. He liked to experiment with colour photography, but this proved expensive. He was also quickly bored of having to deal with clients. This motivated him in 1951 to turn his studio into the Visual Arts Club, whose aim was to allow him, through lectures and demonstrations, to pass on his ideas to others and to provide nude models for amateur photographers. Straker came up with the term "appraisers" for those who just wanted to watch and learn. Life drawing classes were also a major part of the Club. The Club would often take part in London's Soho Fair with a float of their own and an exhibition called Femina. In 1961, the name of the Club changed to the Academy of Visual Arts.

On 22 May 1958, the BBC Third Programme broadcast a discussion on Pin-ups and Figure Studies with Jean Straker and fellow photographers Jack Eston and Walter Bird.

The passing of the 1959 Obscene Publications Act in 1959 resulted in a continuous cycle of prosecutions and appeals as Straker refused to compromise his artistic integrity. He became instrumental in changing the censorship laws of the United Kingdom in the 1960s.

After nearly a decade of litigation, he retired to Sussex. He died in 1984.

== Books ==
- The Nudes of Jean Straker, Charles Skilton, London. 1958.

== See also ==
- Artistic freedom
- Freedom of information
- Freedom of speech
