= Godalming Grammar School =

Location
- Tuesley Lane; Godalming, Surrey; England; 51.172°N 0.616°W

Information
- Type: Grammar school
- Established: 1930
- Closed: 1978
- Local authority: Surrey
- Gender: Co-educational
- Age: 11 to 18
- Destiny: Became Godalming College

Godalming Grammar School was a state-funded selective grammar School taking both boys and girls, situated in Tuesley Lane, Godalming, England.

== Organisation ==
Post-war, students were selected via the eleven-plus examination. From the early 1960s, there were three classes in each of the first five-year groups. Each class held about thirty students and was referenced using the year group number and house system letter: J (for Jekyll), F (for Fearon) or P (for Page) - Jekyll, Fearon and Page being famous people with some connection to the Godalming area; for example class '1J'. Students were usually allocated to a class based on age, with students in 'J' being the older students. (Prior to the early 1960s, there had been four houses: Freyberg, Mallory, Phillips and McKenna.) After year five, students were able to join the sixth form for two further years, the lower sixth and the upper sixth.

== Sports ==
The school held an annual sports day with numerous track and field events. Students competed to earn points for their respective houses. At the end of the day the points were totalled and the winning house declared.

== History ==
The school was founded in 1930. It was formally known as Godalming County Grammar School. In 1978, it closed as a grammar school and became Godalming College, a sixth form college.

== Notable alumni ==
- Louis George Alexander, lexicographer
- Ben Elton, writer
- Gabrielle Glaister, actress who appeared in Brookside
- Paul McCue, military historian
- Bob Mitchell, Labour MP from 1966 to 1970 for Southampton Test and from 1971 to 1983 for Southampton Itchen
- John Noble (baritone)
- Sir Hugh Orde, Chief Constable from 2002 to 2009 of the Police Service of Northern Ireland
- Dr Chris Tame, who founded the Libertarian Alliance
