= Walter Bird (photographer) =

English photographer (1903–1969)

Walter Bird FRPS
- Photographed by Godfrey Argent in 1966
- Born: 1903
- Died: 4 March 1969 (aged 65–66)
- Known for: Official photographer for the National Photographic Record

Walter Bird FRPS (1903 – 4 March 1969) was a British photographer. Bird became known for his images of nudes and jointly set up a studio, Photo Centre Ltd., with John Everard and Horace Roye in 1939. From 1958 he was chief photographer for J. Russell & Sons, eventually purchasing the business in 1961. From 1958 to 1967 he was the official photographer for the National Photographic Record, initiated by the National Portrait Gallery to record important and influential citizens. He was a fellow of the Royal Photographic Society.

== Life and work ==
Early in his career Bird worked mostly on advertising commissions and portraits that were published in periodicals such as Theatre World and Tatler. He shared his studios at Kinocrat House, 85, Cromwell Road, London with the photographer Joan Craven. He became famous for his images of nudes and was a rival of the photographers John Everard and Horace Roye. As the intense competition was harming their business, they eventually decided to cooperate instead, which led to them in 1939 setting up a joint company called Photo Centre Ltd.

They made their headquarters in a suite of rooms above Bird's studio in Savile Row. Eves without Leaves (1940) was their first joint publication, which proved popular with Allied troops during the Second World War. In September 1940, however, the photographic studios were severely damaged by the German Luftwaffe during a bombing raid. During the war Bird served with the Crown Film Unit, before re-establishing his business at 46 Queen's Gate, London.

When Walter Stoneman died in 1958 Bird took over his position as chief photographer for J. Russell & Sons, purchasing the business in 1961. Bird superseded Stoneman as the official photographer for the National Photographic Record, initiated by the National Portrait Gallery in 1917 to record important and influential citizens.

He was elected a member of the Royal Photographic Society in 1936, gained his Associate in 1937 and Fellowship in 1948. He held a one-man show of his work at the Society's house at 16 Princes Gate. He remained a member until his death on 4 March 1969.

== Publications ==
- Beauty’s Daughters, John Long, London, 1938
- Beauty’s Self, John Long, London, 1941
- Eves Without Leaves (with Roye and John Everard), C. Arthur Pearson, London, 1940.
- More Eves Without Leaves (with Roye and John Everard), The Camera Studies Club, Elstree, 1941.
- Eternal Eve (with Roye and John Everard), Elstree Publications, London, 1947.
- Miniature Lovelies (with Roye and John Everard), The Camera Studies Club, Elstree
- Curves and Colour (with Roye and John Everard), The Camera Studies Club, Elstree
- Graceful Memories, The New Spotlight on Beauty Series No. 1, The Camera Studies Club, Elstree
- Andre: Britain’s Venus, The New Spotlight on Beauty Series No. 4, The Camera Studies Club, Elstree
