= John Everard (photographer) =

- Occupation: Photographer
- Years active: 1930s–1966

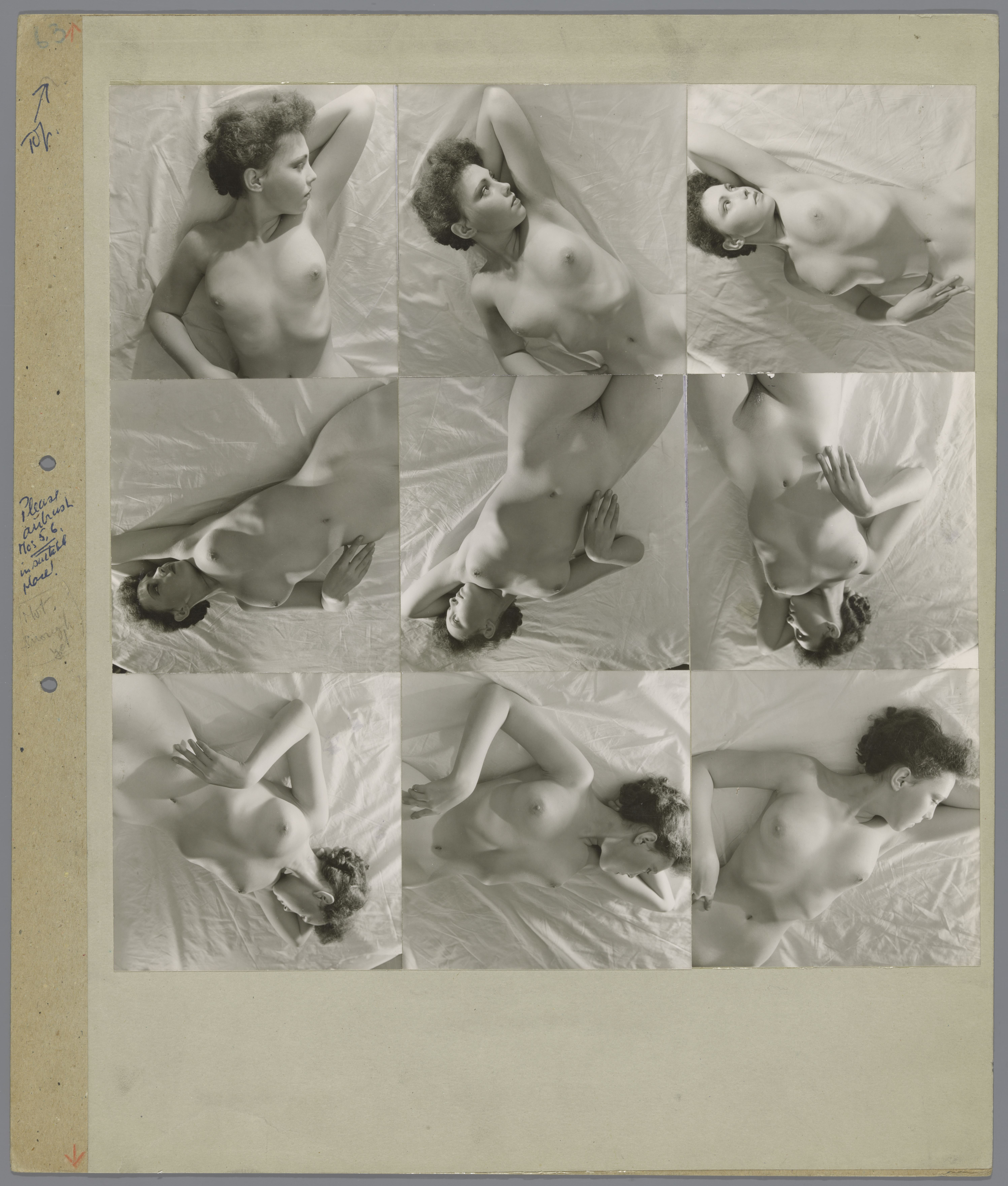
Nine nude portraits unknown model, collection: Rijksmuseum Amsterdam

John Everard, born Edward Ralph Forward, was a First World War veteran (he was awarded the Military Cross) and former rubber planter, who became a British portrait, fashion, stage and studio photographer. He was a noted photographer of nudes from the late 1920s until the early 1960s.

== Life ==
Everard had a studio in Orange Street, London and was self-taught. The book Second Sitting included photographs of a young Pamela Green. As early as 1939, Walter Bird, John Everard and Horace Roye had decided that they were giving each other too much competition. To resolve that difficulty they decided to cooperate, and they set up a company called Photo Centre Ltd. They made their headquarters in a suite of rooms above Walter Bird's studio in Savile Row, and Eves without Leaves was their first joint publication.

Everard was a fellow of the British Institute of Professional Photography (FBIPP). With Bird and Roye he supplied the magazines Men Only and Lilliput.

== Publications ==
- Photographs for the Papers: How to Take and Place Them (1923).
- Adam's Fifth Rib (Chapman & Hall, London. 1935).
- Life Lines (Chapman & Hall, London. 1936).
- Living Colour (George Routledge & Sons. London. 1937).
- Seen in England (Chapman & Hall, London. 1937).
- Portrait of a Model (George Routledge & Sons, London. 1939).
- Eves Without Leaves - with Walter Bird and Roye (C. Arthur Pearson Ltd., London. 1940, 62pp)
- Nymph and Naiad (George Routledge & Sons, London. 1940).
- More Eves Without Leaves - with Walter Bird and Roye (The Camera Studies Club, London. 1941, 42pp)
- Artist's Model (The Bodley Head, London. 1951, 46pp plus 172 plates).
- Second Sitting: Another Artist's Model (The Bodley Head, London. 1954).
- My Hundred Best Studies (The Bodley Head, London. 1954).
- Oriental Model (Robert Hale, London. 1955, 14pp plus 48 single-sided plates).
- Sculptor's Model: A Third Sitting (The Bodley Head, London. 1956).
- In Camera (Robert Hale, London. 1957).
- Model in Movement (The Bodley Head, London. 1959).
- Model in Shadow (Robert Hale, London. 1963).
