= Godfrey Argent =

English photographer (1937–2006)

- Godfrey Argent, self-portrait, 1972
- Born: Bernard Godfrey Argent; 6 February 1937; Eastbourne, Sussex, England
- Died: 1 June 2006 (aged 69); Kensington, London, England
- Occupation: Photographer

Bernard Godfrey Argent (6 February 1937 – 1 June 2006) was an English photographer notable for his black and white portraits of royalty, politicians, aristocrats and celebrities.

== Early life ==
Argent was born in Eastbourne, Sussex, the son of motor engineer Godfrey Stanley Albert Argent, and his wife, Helena (née Smith). He had two sisters. He was educated at Bexhill Grammar School, and then briefly entered the police constabulary, where he first learned photography.

== Career ==
In 1954, Argent joined the Royal Horse Guards, Household Cavalry, serving with the Life Guards for nine years. In 1960, he became an Associate Member of the Royal Photographic Society and won the British Army Photographic Competition.

He photographed Field Marshal Sir Gerald Templer, who encouraged him to pursue photography instead of staying in the military. Argent later recalled being told by Templer, "Don't get to my age and then regret what you might have been." Templer recommended Argent to Sir John Miller, the Crown Equerry, who hired him to photograph the Royal Mews for a guidebook.

Argent was commissioned to take the photographs for Judith Campbell's book The Queen Rides, published in 1965, which featured the Queen with her horses at Windsor Castle, Sandringham House and Balmoral Castle. He served as royal photographer until 1974, given unparalleled access to the Queen and her family. Among his notable portraits include Prince Charles for the postage stamp marking his investiture as the prince of Wales in 1968, and the group portraits for the royal family's Christmas cards from 1966 to 1974.

His most extraordinary royal portrait was probably his 1967 photo session with Princess Alice of Battenberg, mother of Prince Philip, Duke of Edinburgh, who had fallen ill. Worried she may not survive, the Queen sent Argent to the King Edward VII Hospital to photograph Princess Alice, who was usually dressed as a nun in her later years, but was in her hospital gown. They were the final portraits taken of Princess Alice.

In 1967 Argent became the official photographer for the National Photographic Record at the National Portrait Gallery. From 1967 to 1993 Argent also served as official photographer for the Royal Society, photographing scientists Stephen Hawking, Sir Peter Medawar, Dorothy Hodgkin and Francis Crick.

He joined the photographic agency, Camera Press, founded by Tom Blau, who represented Antony Armstrong-Jones, 1st Earl of Snowdon, Patrick Anson, 5th Earl of Lichfield, Cecil Beaton, Norman Parkinson and Yousuf Karsh, the latter whom Argent admired the most. Argent had London studios in Queen's Gate and then in Holland Street in Kensington, where he became a celebrated photographer of prominent businessmen, families and soldiers. He also purchased the archives of prominent photographers Walter Bird and Baron.

== Personal life ==
Argent was married three times. In 1956, he married Janet Boniface, with whom he had three daughters. After her death in 1969, he was briefly married to Anne Coxon, whom he divorced in 1973. In 1975, he married Sally McAlpine, with whom he had another daughter. They were divorced in 1990.

He died in London in 2006, age 69, of oesophageal cancer.

In 2007, the National Portrait Gallery established the Godfrey Argent Award for its annual portrait competition, awarded for the best black and white photograph or the best photographer under aged 25.
