= Louis George Alexander =

British teacher and author

Louis George Alexander (15 January 1932 – 17 June 2002) (commonly referred to as L. G. Alexander) was a British teacher and the author of numerous course books on English as a Foreign Language (EFL), including New Concept English.

In 1977, he sold 4.7m books, which was recorded at the time in the Guinness Book of Records as the greatest number of copies sold by an individual author in one year.

== Biography ==
Louis Alexander was born Elias George Ftyaras in London. His father, George Ftyaras, was Greek and his mother, Mary Ftyaras née Manolas, was an Australian of Greek ancestry – "so he spoke perfect English and perfect Greek".

During much of World War II he was with his mother in Australia. They later returned to Britain, where he was educated at Godalming Grammar School and the University of London. From 1954 to 1956 he was on national service in the British Army of the Rhine in Germany, where he had his first experience as an educator, teaching A-level English as an Educational Corps instructor. He taught English, for most of the time as head of the English department, at Protypon Lykeion, Athens (now the Scholi Moraïti) from 1956 to 1965

In the 1960s his books started to be published, by Longmans. In 1962 his first book, Sixty Steps to Précis, was published and became a bestseller. His second book, A First Book in Comprehension, was published in 1964. New Concept English, his first major book series, was published in 1967. With Longman he also published series including Look Listen and Learn (1968–71), Target (1972–74), and Mainline (1973–81).

Alexander was a member of the Council of Europe Committee on Modern Language Teaching (1973–78), and one of the authors of The Threshold Level (1975) and Waystage (1977), works developed for the Council of Europe that have been the bases of many communicative language courses and forms the Common European Framework of Reference for Languages. He served on the Committee of Management of the Society of Authors (1980–83). In the 1980s Alexander wrote reference books including Longman English Grammar (1988; practice book 1990) and Longman Advanced Grammar (1993).

In the late 1980s he worked for UNESCO on Junior English for China course. He created the blueprint for the Survive self-study series (1980–83, reissued 1989) for modern languages and published courses in the field of computer-assisted language learning.

In 1986–88 he was adviser to the University of Cambridge Local Examinations Syndicate for the Cambridge Certificate in English for International Communication.

He was a writer of EFL course materials from the 1960s onwards. Alexander consistently supported the cause of the relatively untrained non-native speaking teacher of English.

Louis Alexander died of leukaemia on 17 June 2002 in Chambéry, Savoie, France.

== Legacy ==
Tim Rix, former chairman of the Longman Group, praised Alexander as having "particular abilities and knowledge", combined with a "use of linguistics", which "meshed perfectly well with the requirements of ELT [English language teaching]" in his time.

Alexander had an immense influence on English language teaching in China. In recognition of this, a statue was raised in his honour in the grounds of the "Foreign Language Teaching and Research Press..., one of China's largest schoolbook publishers". The statue bears the following inscription: "...the man who cracked the linguistic code of the English language and made it learnable for millions of students worldwide through New Concept English and many other course books".

== Personal life ==
Louis Alexander married Athina Voyatsis in Athens in 1956. They had had a daughter, Marianna (born 1961) and a son George (born 1963). Athina died in 1979. Louis married Julia née Mendus in 1980.

== Bibliography ==
His publications include:

=== Books ===
- Sixty Steps to Precis (1962)
- Poetry and Prose Appreciation (1963)
- A First Book in Comprehension (1964)
- Essays and Letter Writing (1965)
- A First Book in Comprehension (1965)
- New Concept English (1967)
- For and Against (1968)
- Look, Listen and Learn! (1968–71)
- Operation Mastermind (1971)
- Target (1972–74)
- Mainline (1973–81)
- Follow Me (1979–80)
- Excel (for Egyptian Secondary Schools, 1985)
- Plain English (1987–88)
- Longman English Grammar (1988)
- Longman English Grammar Practice (1990)
- Step by Step 1–3 (1991)
- Longman Advanced Grammar (1993)
- Right Word, Wrong Word (1994)
- K's First Case
- Good Morning, Mexico
- Dangerous Game (2000)

Other books by Alexander are listed in his For and Against (1968).

=== Articles ===
- "Fads and fashions in English language teaching", English Today, 21: 35–56, 1990.
