= New Concept English =

English language textbook

Longman's New Concept English by L. G. Alexander is a popular English language textbook teaching the British rules of English. The course was first published on October 30, 1967. A revised edition, which was "specifically prepared for Chinese learners", came out in 1997.

The course consists of four components:

- The Students' Book
- The Teacher's Book
- A set of cassettes, on which the multi-purpose texts have been recorded.
- Another set of cassettes, on which Repetition drill in the Teacher's Book has been recorded.

New Concept English (1967) has been described as "a breath of fresh air" in which the author, L. G. Alexander, utilised "a syllabus as a foundation for effective learning" and organised "the language in ways which students - and their teachers - found immensely stimulating".

== Book 1: First Things First ==
This introductory book has 144 lessons, 72 of which are for exercises. The focus is oral English.

== Book 2: Practice & Progress ==
This book includes 96 lessons. The focus switched from daily conversations into short stories, mainly focusing on expanding vocabulary and more complex grammar structures.

== Book 3: Developing Skills ==
At this level, there is less need for pattern control and contextualization. Now that the foundations have been laid, the student is in a position to cope with new sentence patterns as and when they occur. This book includes 60 lessons.

== Book 4: Fluency in English ==
The materials were chosen from a variety of publications. Nine of the lessons were selected from The Listener. The initial version includes 60 lessons and the revised edition for Chinese learners contains 48 lessons.

== See also ==
- Longman
- Louis George Alexander
