= Johann Walter-Kurau =

Latvian painter

Johann Walter
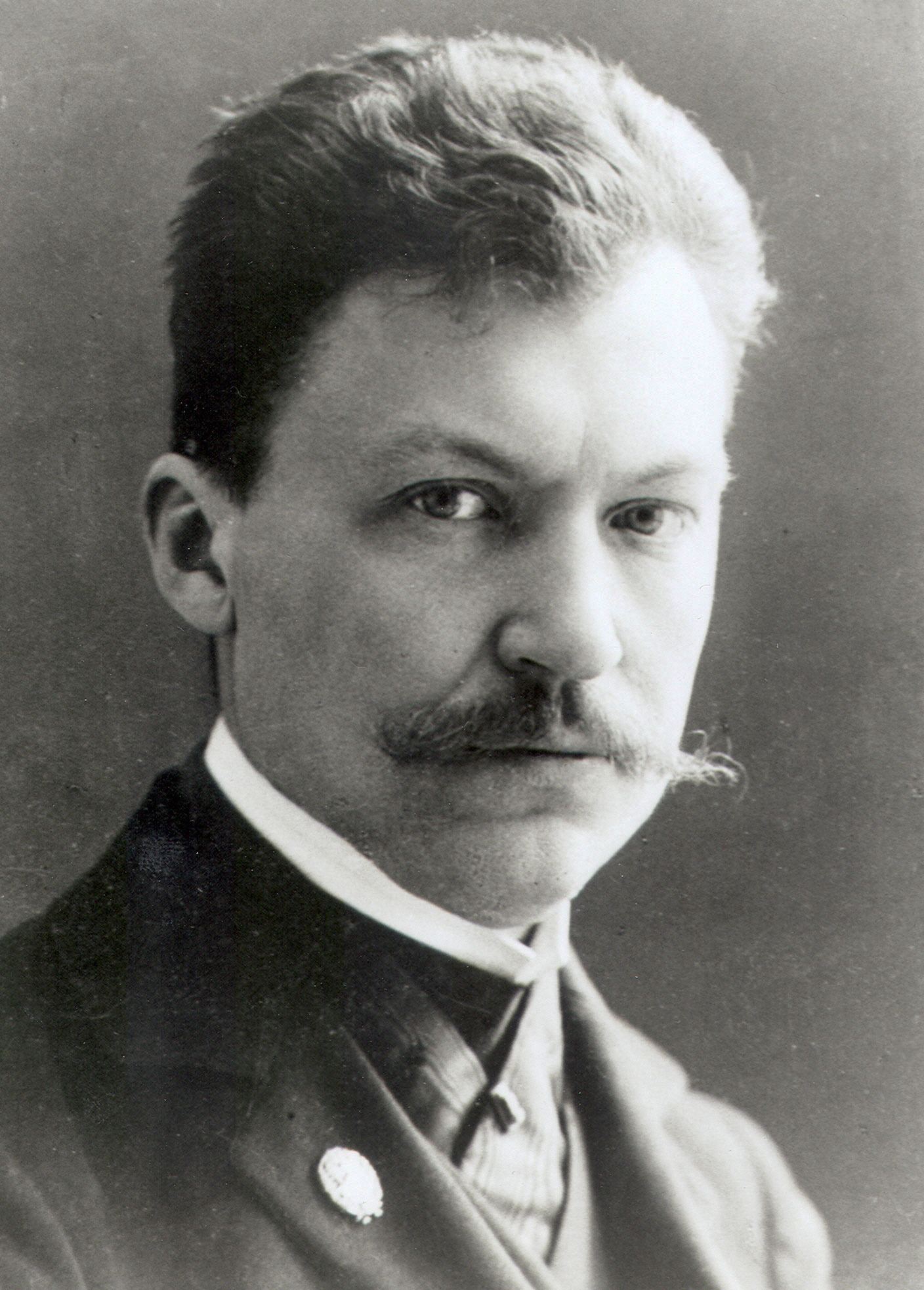
- Walter-Kurau in 1900
- Born: 3 February 1869; Jelgava, Russian Empire
- Died: 19 December 1932 (aged 63); Berlin, Germany
- Known for: Painting
- Movement: Realism, Impressionism, expressionism (later)

Johann Walter-Kurau, also known as Jānis Valters (Latvian) or Johann Walter, (3 February 1869 – 19 December 1932) was a Latvian painter.

== Life ==
Walter was born in Jelgava, 45 km (28 mi) south of Riga in the family of a latvian merchant Teodors Valters. He had German citizenship through his Baltic German mother Catharina Kurau.

He studied art at the Imperial Academy of Arts in St. Petersburg with Janis Rozentāls and Vilhelms Purvītis, and built up an oeuvre that ranged from the academic realism of the 1890s, through a style inspired by Impressionism and Expressionism, to the verge of abstraction with a peculiar non-objective vision of nature late in his career.

At the turn of the 20th century Walter stood out as one of the most important emerging artists in Latvia, but left in 1906 to work in Dresden, where he changed his last name to Walter-Kurau. He lived in Dresden for 10 years before moving to Berlin in 1916 or 1917.

More than 120 of his works are in the collection of Latvian National Museum of Art in Riga, including his most famous work from the pre-Germany era, Bathing Boys (1900). He is included in Latvian cultural canon.

He died in Berlin in 1932.

== Gallery ==
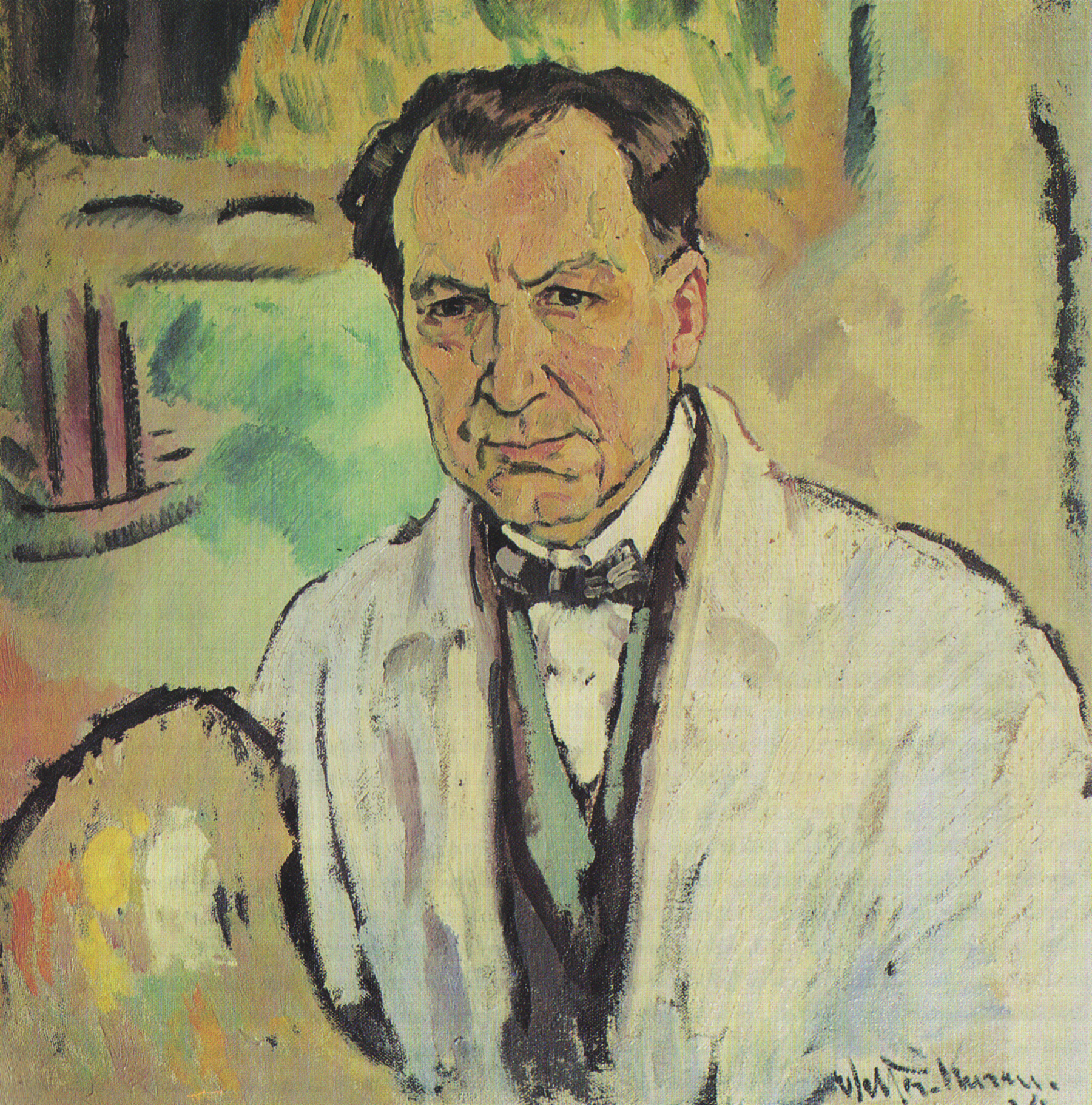
Self portrait (1924)

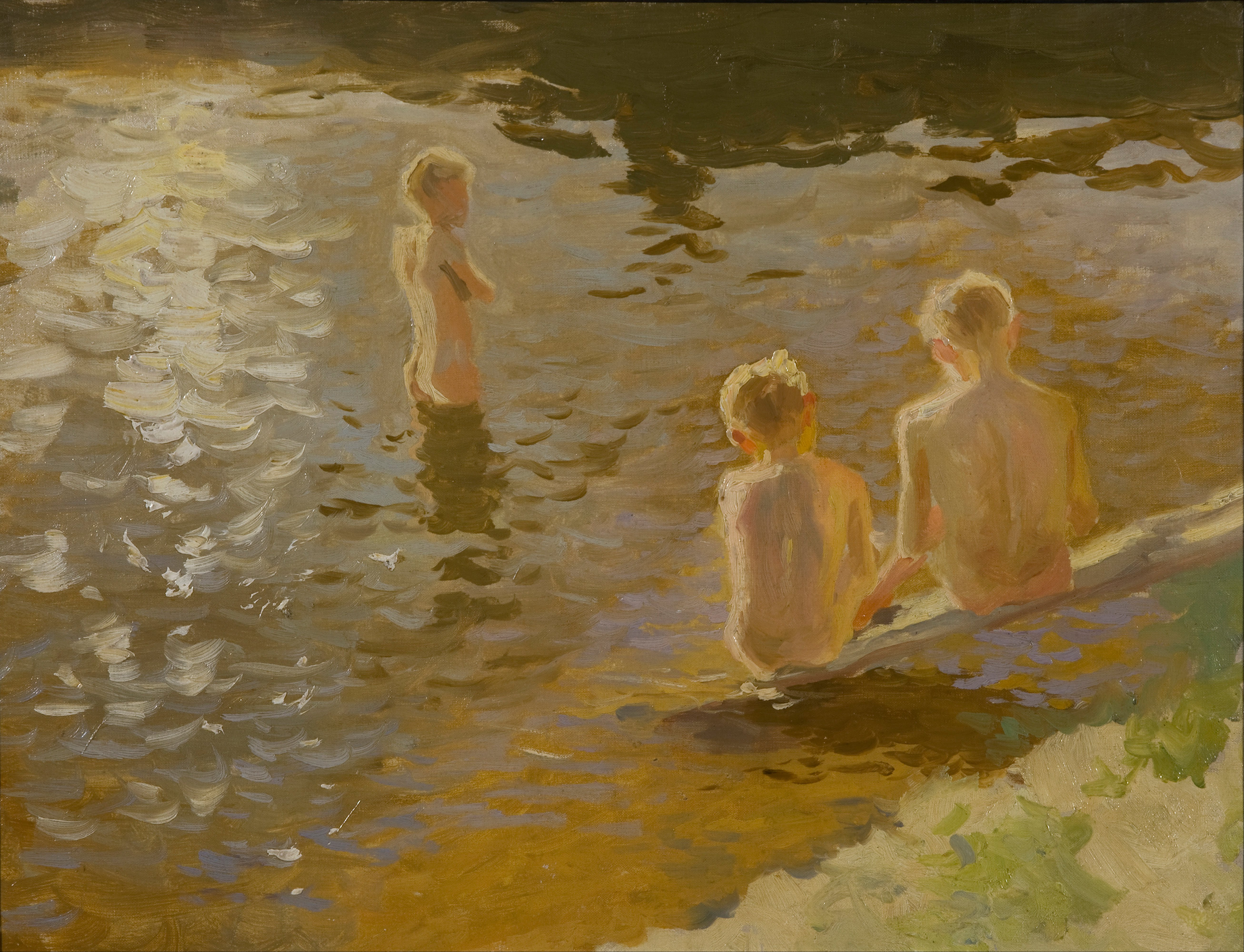
Bathing Boys (1900)

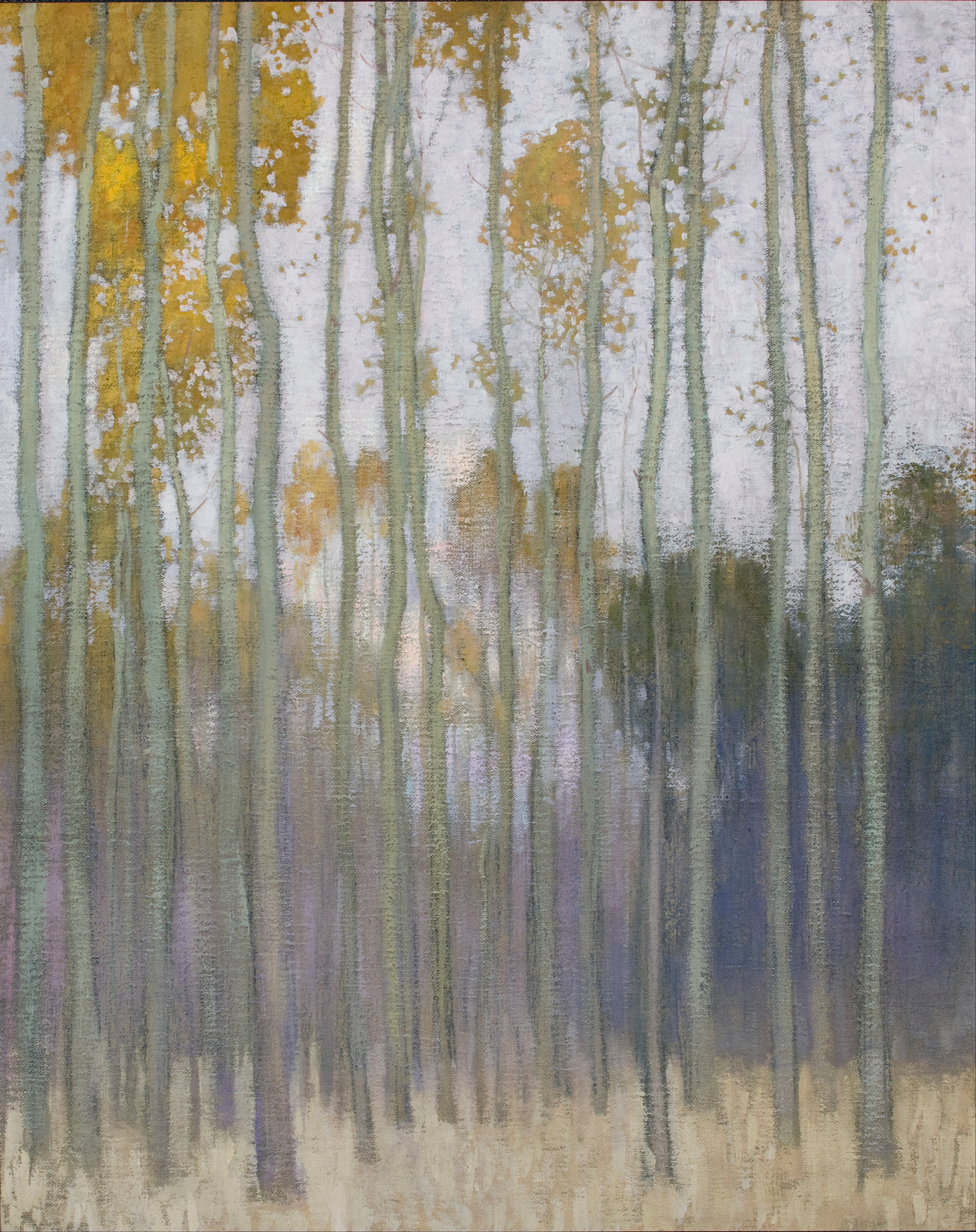
Forest (Morning sun) 1904

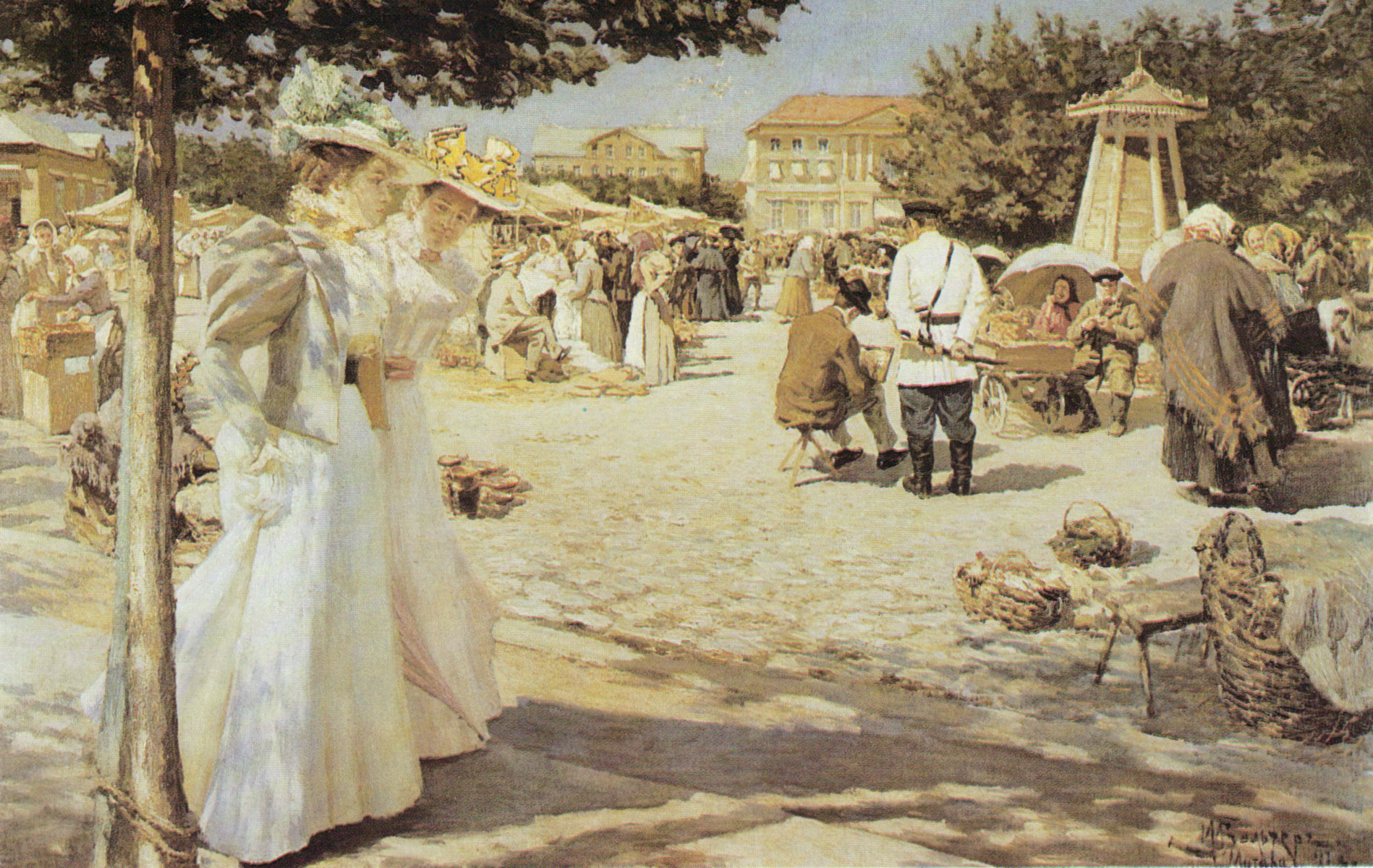
Market in Jelgava (1897)

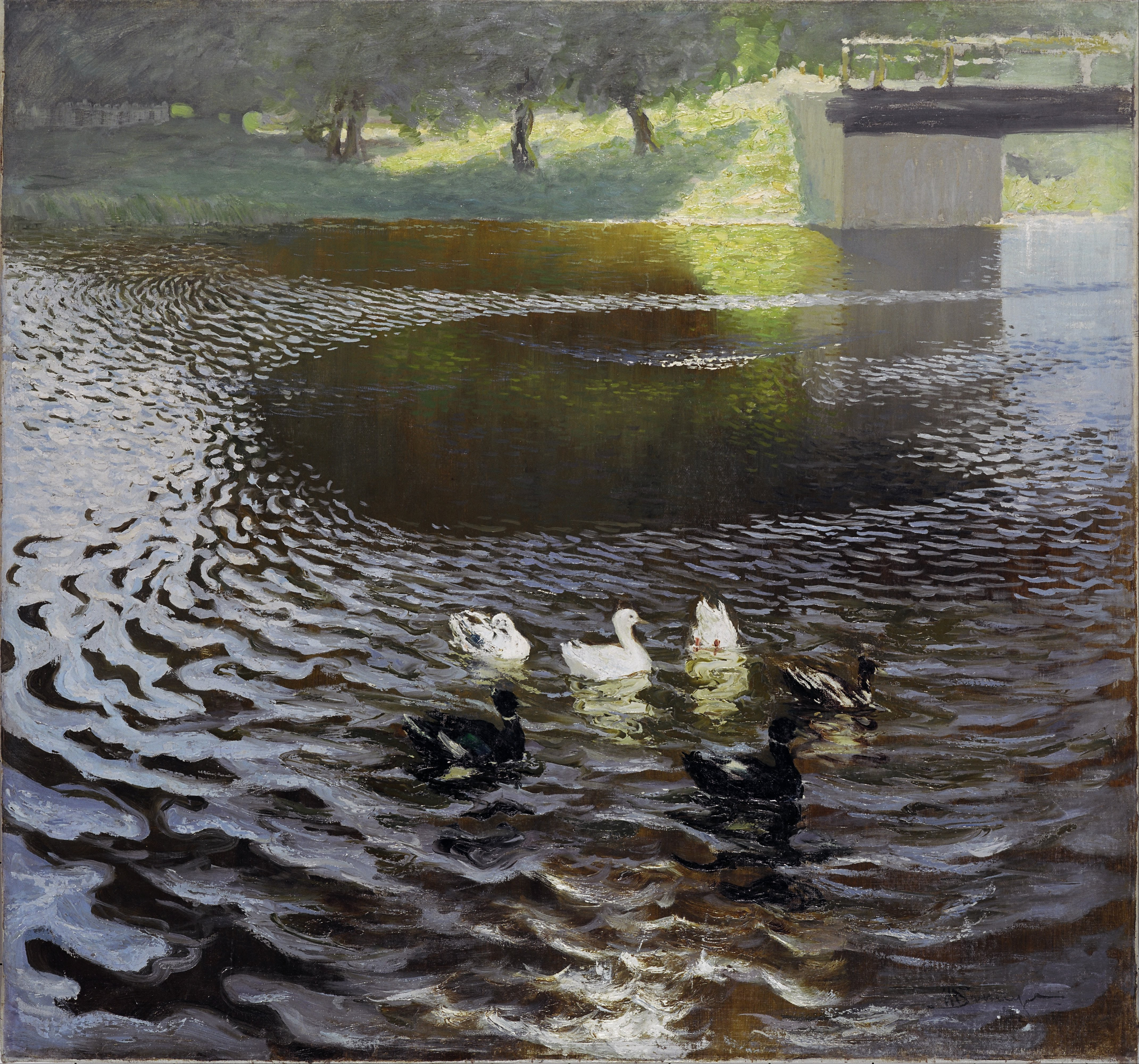
Ducks (1898)

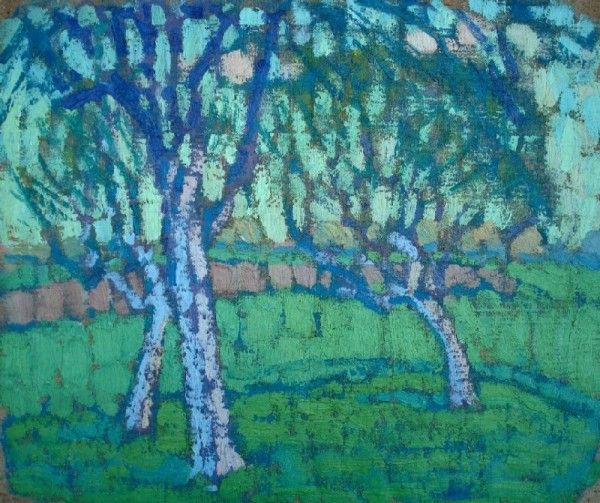
Landscape with birch trees (circa 1912)

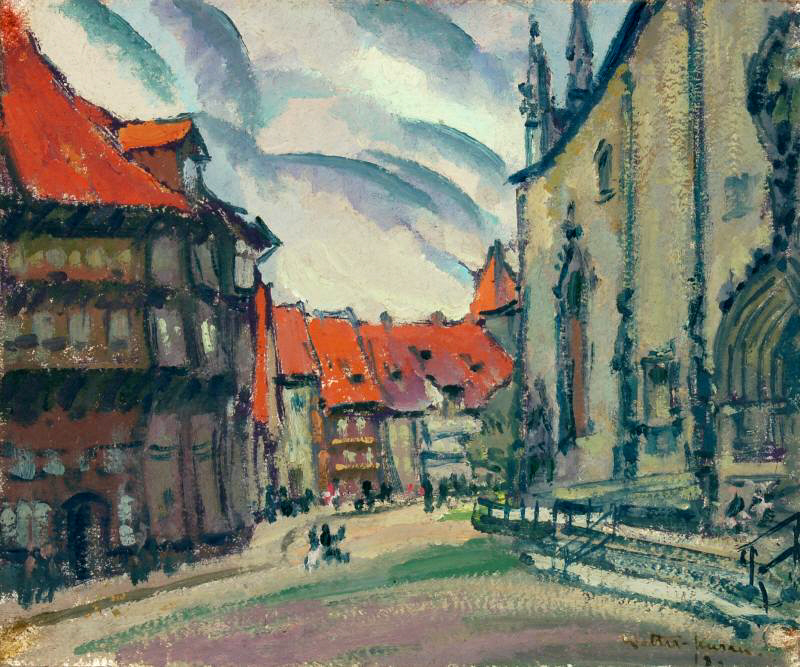
Church square (1918)

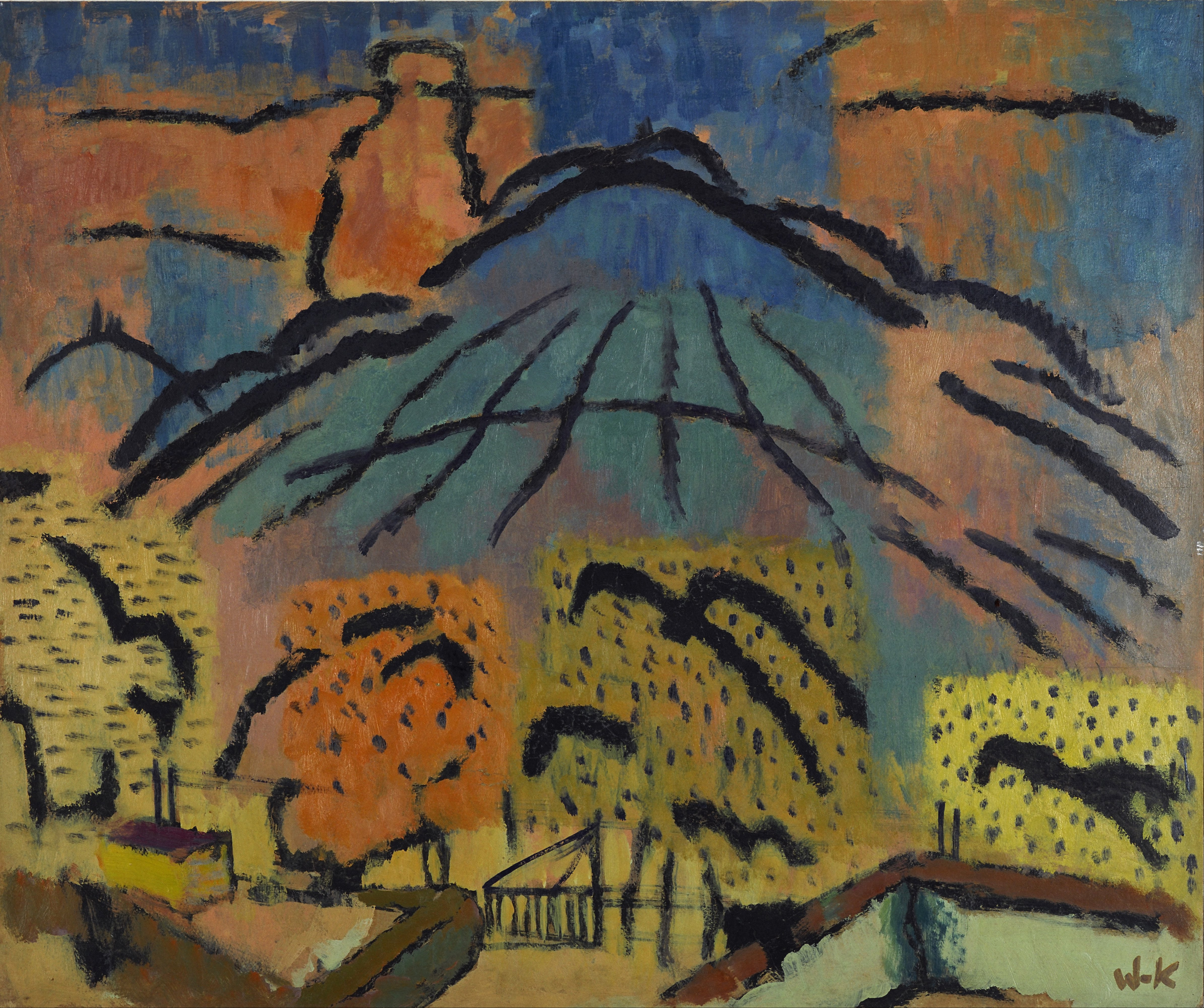
Mountain near Metzinger (1925)
