= Donald Buck =

American field hockey player (1916–2002)

Donald Eaton Buck
Personal information
- Born: September 26, 1916 Hartford, Connecticut, U.S.
- Died: June 3, 2002 (aged 85) Cockeysville, Maryland, U.S.

Sport
- Sport: Field hockey

Donald Eaton Buck (September 26, 1916 – June 3, 2002) was an American field hockey player. He competed in the men's tournament at the 1948 Summer Olympics.

== Early life and military service ==
Buck graduated from Johns Hopkins University, where he was on the football, wrestling and lacrosse teams. He served as an officer in the United States Army Air Forces and deployed overseas in 1944. He deployed to the India-Burma theater of operations and returned in 1945.
