= Ten Minutes Older (1978) =

Short film

Ten Minutes Older is a 1978 black and white short film directed by Latvian filmmaker Herz Frank. The film explores the emotional connection between art and audience.

== Plot ==
A dark room focuses on a group of children, faces illuminated by the silver screen. Focusing on the facial expressions of one boy, whose emotions range from happiness, sadness, and fear. The camera pans to other children that make up the audience, sharing collective expressions while their eyes are gazing forward, all while ten minutes passes.

== Cast and Crew ==
- Herz Frank, Producer, Screenplay Director
- Juris Podnieks, Cinematography
- Paul's Pakalns, Producer
- Produced by Riga Film Studio
