= Rubén González (Chilean footballer) =

Chilean footballer (1927–2002)

Personal information
- Date of birth: 5 December 1927
- Date of death: 13 June 2002 (aged 74)
- Position: Midfielder

International career
Years	Team	Apps	(Gls)
- Chile

Rubén González (5 December 1927 – 13 June 2002) was a Chilean footballer. He competed in the men's tournament at the 1952 Summer Olympics.
