= Bathing Boys =

Painting by Johann Walter-Kurau

- Peldētāji zēni (Latvian)
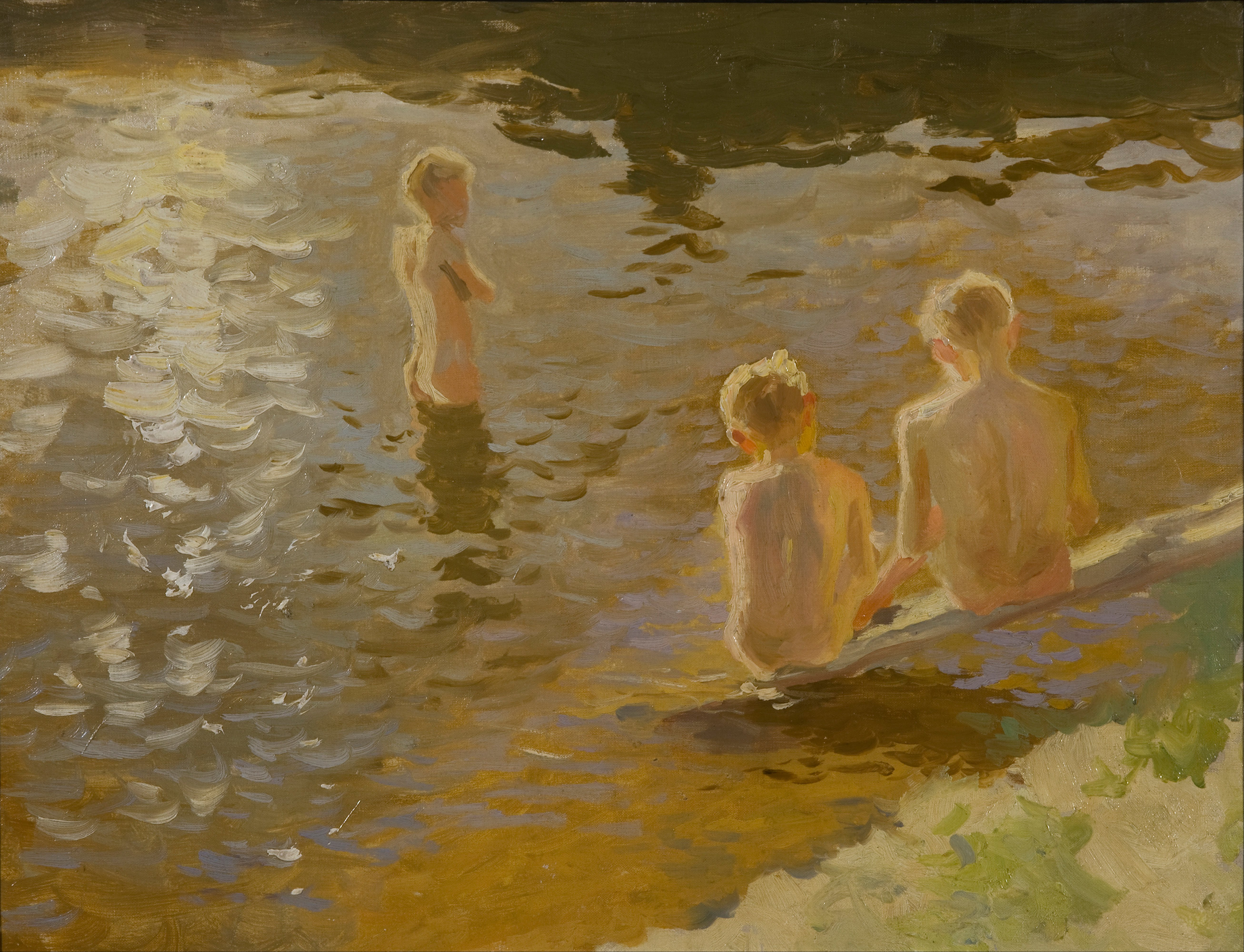
- Artist: Jānis Valters
- Year: 1900
- Medium: oil on canvas
- Dimensions: 36 cm × 45 cm (14 in × 18 in)
- Location: Latvian National Museum of Art, Riga

Bathing Boys (Latvian: Peldētāji zēni) is a painting by the artist Jānis Valters (later Johann Walter-Kurau) from 1900.

== Description ==
The painting is oil on canvas, with dimensions 36 by 45 centimetres (14 in × 18 in).

The painting belongs to the Latvian National Museum of Art in Riga.

== Analysis ==
The image depicts three boys bathing at a beach in warm sunshine. Valters painted several pictures of similar design in the period 1900–1926.
