= Horace Roye =

British photographer (1906–2002)

Tomorrow's Crucifixion (1938)

Horace Narbeth (4 March 1906 – 11 June 2002), known professionally as Roye, was a British photographer.

== Life and work ==
Roye's photograph Tomorrow's Crucifixion, depicting a nude model wearing a gas mask while pinned to a crucifix caused controversy when published in the North London Recorder in August 1938, but later became a noted photograph of its time.

In 1954 with a fellow photographer called Vala, Roye came up with the Roye-Vala 3-D Process. Not to miss an opportunity his company The Camera Studies Club published the Stereo Glamour Series of 3-D books of nude studies and pin-ups. As a photographer of nudes, he successfully contested the obscenity laws of his day. An account of which he published in 1960 in the booklet Unique Verdict – the Story of an Unsuccessful Prosecution.

Roye retired to Portugal. During the 1974 revolution, he was besieged in his house, holding out with a shotgun. Forced to sell up he returned to England. In 1980, he made his final move to Rabat, the capital of Morocco. He became Morocco's oldest British expatriate, and he was also the longest-serving member of the British Institute of Professional Photographers. He took up parasailing at the age of 75 and water-skied on the river Bouregeg until he was 78 years old.

Roye was married three times. His first marriage was to actress Joan Dare. He later married Renee Bernadeau who had been a French dancer. His final marriage was to Marilyn, a Canadian model who died in 1993.

In 2002 at the age of 96, Roye was stabbed to death by an intruder at his home in the kasbah of Rabat.

== Publications ==
- Phyllis in Censorland. The Camera Studies Club, 1942 and later edition 1956.
- Perfect Womanhood. George Routledge & Sons, London, 1941.
- The English Maid. George Routledge & Sons, London, 1939.
- The Scottish Maid. George Routledge & Sons, London, 1940.
- The Irish Maid. George Routledge & Sons, London, 1941.
- Desirée. Chapman & Hall, London, 1942. Later, smaller sized paper backed edition, The Camera Studies Club, London.
- The Welsh Maid. George Routledge & Sons, London, 1942.
- Phyllis Dixey Album The Spotlight on Beauty Series no.3. The Camera Studies Club, Elstree. Relates to Phyllis Dixey.
- Rhapsody in Colour. The Camera Studies Club, London, 1943.
- Maids. Elstree, Elstree, 1947.
- Canadian Beauty. The Camera Studies Club, 1952.
- Glamour on Parade No.1, Posed by George Black's Lovelies. The Camera Studies Club, Elstree.
- Nude Ego. Hutchinson, London, 1955.
- Unique Editions, Nos. 1, 2, 3, and 4. Art, London.
- Unique Verdict - the Story of an Unsuccessful Prosecution. Art, 1960.
- Unique Verdict – Art Supplement. Art, London.
- Curves and Colour. The Camera Studies Club, London, 1943. With Walter Bird and John Everard.
- More Eves Without Leaves (with Walter Bird and John Everard). The Camera Studies Club, Elstree, 1941.
- Eves Without Leaves (with Walter Bird and John Everard). C. Arthur Pearson, London, 1940.
- Eternal Eve (with Walter Bird and John Everard). Elstree, London, 1947.
- Arthur Ferrier's Lovelies. Photographs by Roye. Published by Chapman and Hall, London, 1941. Later, smaller sized paperback editions by the Camera Studies Club, London.
