= Regīna Ezera =

Latvian writer

- Born: 20 December 1930; Rīga, Latvia
- Died: 11 June 2002 (aged 71); Ķegums, Latvia
- Occupation: Writer

Regīna Ezera, the pen name of Regīna Šamreto (20 December 1930 – 11 June 2002), was a Latvian author of Polish origin who wrote more than 20 novels. A recipient of the Order of the Three Stars, she suffered financially as a result of the end of communism, living in some poverty at the end of her life.

== Biography ==
Born in Riga, Ezera was the daughter of a carpenter and a nurse. She was brought up in a small residence where her grandmother and aunt also lived. Her Catholic family spoke Polish and she did not learn Latvian until she was six and at school.

In 1944, the family was deported to Germany but returned to Latvia in 1945. After matriculating from high school, Ezera studied journalism at the Latvian State University in Riga, graduating in 1955. The same year, her short story Pat īkšķis nelīdzēja (Even My Thumb Did Not Help) was published in the children's journal Bērnība under her pen name Ezera. "Ezera" means "lake" and it was chosen to reflect her childhood which had at times been carefree. During the 1950s she married twice. None of the relationships were successful and she became Regina Kindzule, a single parent of three daughters. She worked for a time as a journalist for the newspaper Pionieris and for Bērnība, the children's journal. In 1961, she published her first book of short stories, Un ceļš vēl kūp, about her wartime experiences. The same year she completed her first of many novels Zem pavasara debesīm (Under the Spring Sky). She continued to write novels, short stories and essays for the rest of her life.

In the 1970s, she had been a member of the Riga Communist Party Committee and in the 1980s she continued to represent her country in the Union of Soviet Writers. In 1988, she joined the emerging movement to establish a Latvian state and this was achieved in 1990. Although she was awarded the Order of the Three Stars in 1995, she suffered financially as a result of the end of communism. She had enjoyed state support for her work but under the new regime this was not available and she lived in some poverty at the end of her life.

Since 1978, Ezera lived in her country house in Ķegums, Latvia. She died there on 11 June 2002. A partial third part of what was intended to be a four-part work called "Being" was published as well as Odes to Sadness in the year after her death.
