= Jānis Jaunsudrabiņš =

Latvian writer and painter (1877–1962)

Jānis Jaunsudrabiņš (25 August 1877 in Nereta – 25 August 1962 in Körbecke) was a Latvian writer and painter and one of the most popular authors of the first Republic of Latvia between the two world wars.

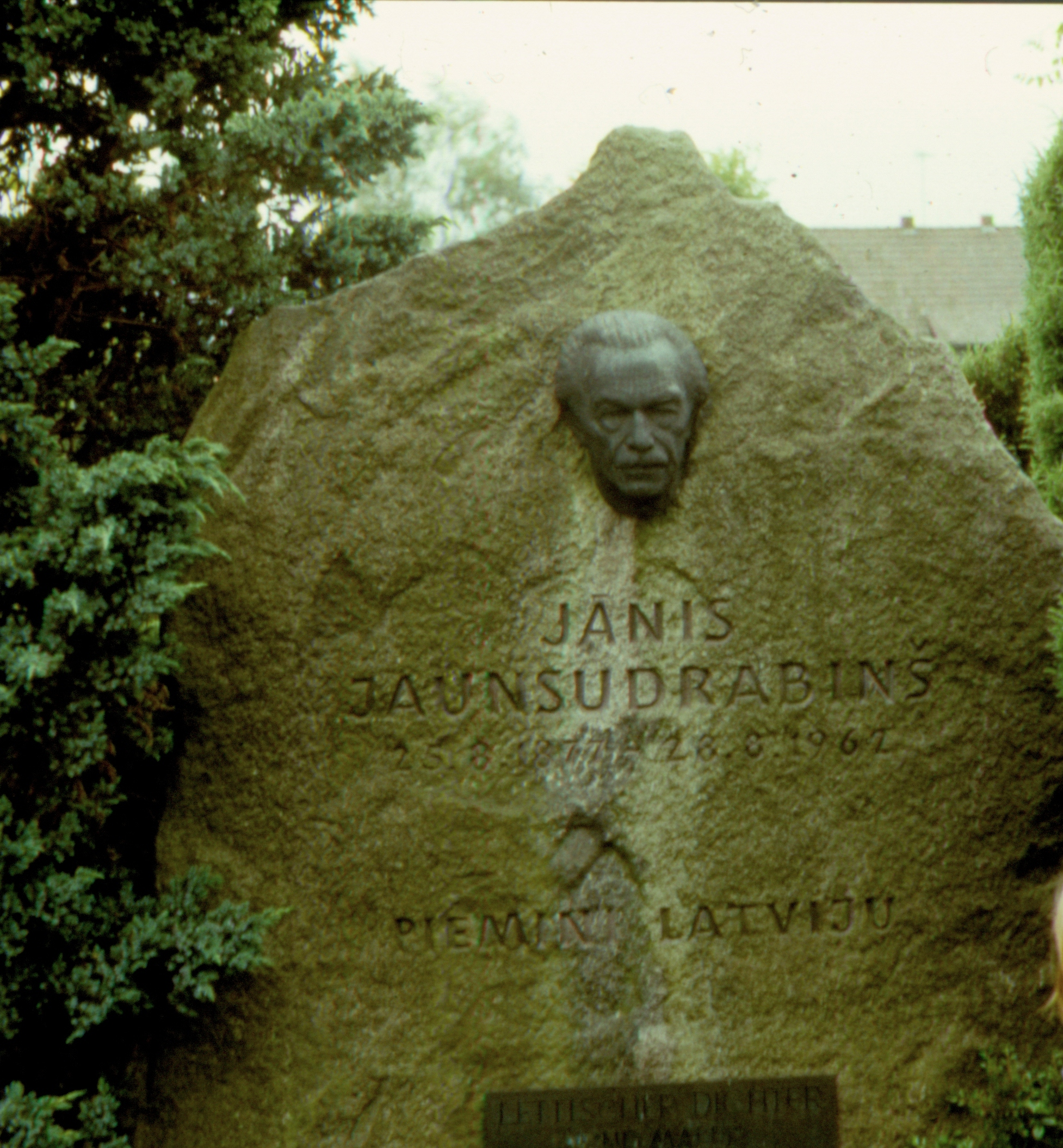
Memorial stone by sculptor Robert Ittermann for Jānis Jaunsudrabiņš in Körbecke. The inscription Piemini Latviju (Latvian commemoration) is the title of an essay from 1949.

== Biography ==
Between 1886–1892 he attended school in Nereta. Thereafter from 1892 until 1893 Jānis went to Panemunis in a russian school. He studied at the Vecsaté Agricultural School from 1895 to 1897. In 1896 he published the first short story, "Winter Night", in the Latvian Aviation Newspaper. From 1898 on he worked as an agricultural specialist in Remte, but was attracted to art later. From 1899 to 1903 he studied at Blum School of Painting in Riga, Latvia. In 1905 he had three months of training in Munich, Germany. Three years after he lived and studied art with his family for one year in Berlin, with his teacher Lovis Corinth. Thereafter he returned and lived in Milgravis from 1913. From 1915 to 1918 he lived in the Caucasus. On his return he engaged in painting and writing. In 1924 he traveled Europe with a grant from the Cultural Foundation. In 1937 he got divorced from his wife Sabile Ilūkste. In 1944 he was retreated to the west.

== Works ==
He painted landscapes, portraits, illustrated books (including his own), wrote articles on art, including on M. K. Čiurlionis.

The story "The Frosty Rings" reveals the love drama of two young people. The experience of childhood is reflected in the "White Paper", "Green Paper", and other collections. The prose has a strong tradition of psychological realism and neo-romanticism. The works subtly convey the spiritual experiences of the characters, despite the life of various strata of rural Latvia, emphasize human connection with nature, continuation of national traditions; Latvian motives abound. He has written pictures, short stories and poems, plays, books on Latvian emigration, and descriptions of Latvians in various countries. His work was translated into Lithuanian language by Kristijonas Donelaitis, Gabrielius Landsbergis-Žemkalnis, and Petras Vaičiūnas.

== Legacy ==
In 1965 Jānis Jaunsudrabiņš Prose Prize (Latvian: Jāņa Jaunsudrabiņa prozas balva) was created.

== Bibliography ==
- Frosty Rings (Latvian: Veja ziedi), 1907
- White Paper (Latvian: Balta grāmata), 1914
- Green Paper (Latvian: Zaļa grāmata), 2 d. 1950–1951,
- Aija (Latvian: Aija), 1911, Echo (Latvian: Atbalss), 1914–1915, Winter (Latvian: Ziema), 1925 trilogy
- Dance of Death (Latvian: Nāves deja), novel, 1924
- The Newcomer and the Devil (Latvian: Jaunsaimnieks un velns), novel, 1933
- Don't Look at the Sun (Latvian: Neskaties saulē), novel, 1936
- Capri (Latvian: Kapri), novel, 1939
- Money (Latvian: Nauda), novel, 1942
- Uršulytė (Latvian: Uršulīte), short story, 1929
- Without Homeland (Latvian: Bez dzimtenes), 1947
- I tell my wife (Latvian: Es stāstu savai sievai), 1951
- My Life (Latvian: Mana dzīve), 1957
