= Riga =

Capital and largest city of Latvia

Riga Rīga (Latvian) Reiga (Latgalian) Rīgõ (Livonian)
- Capital city and state city
- Riga State City
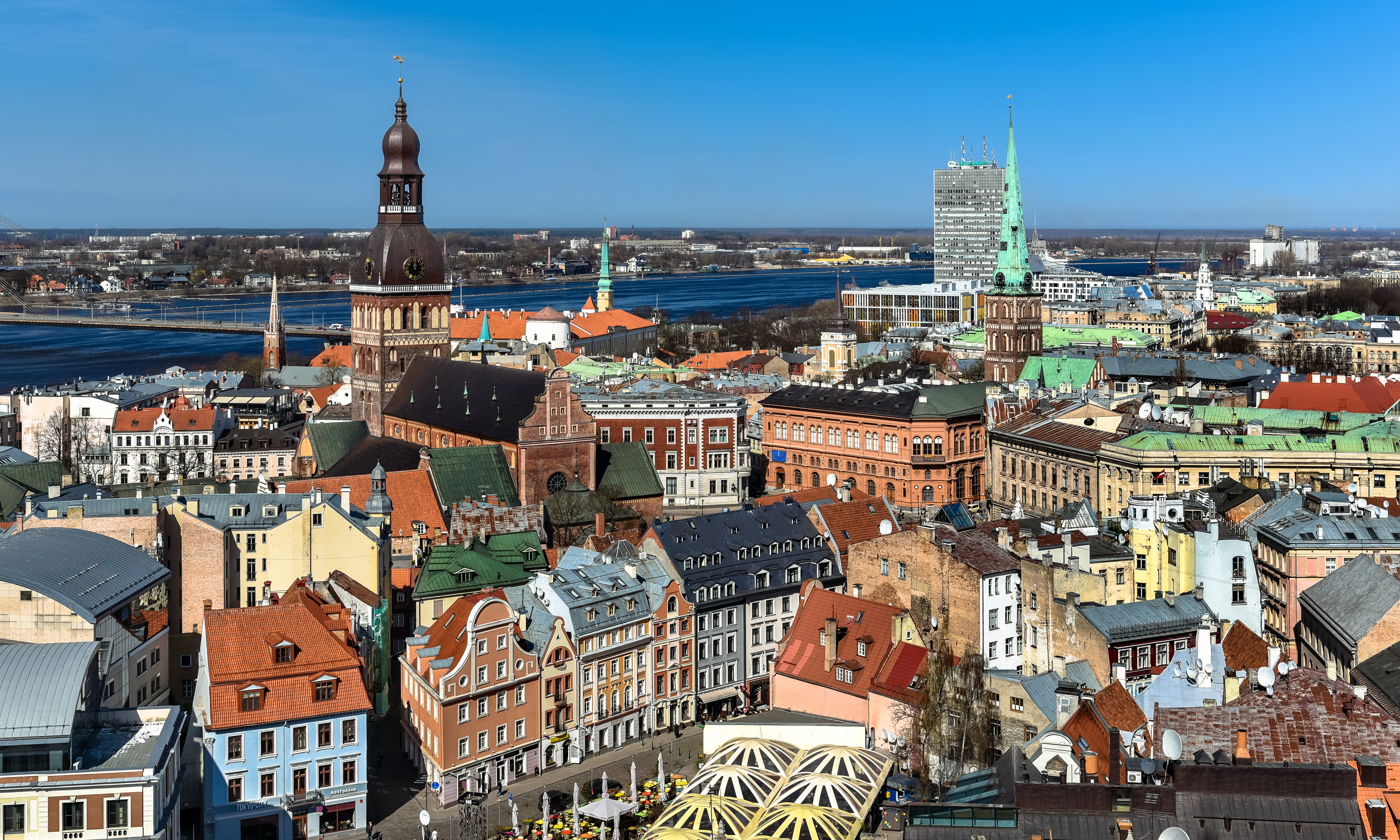
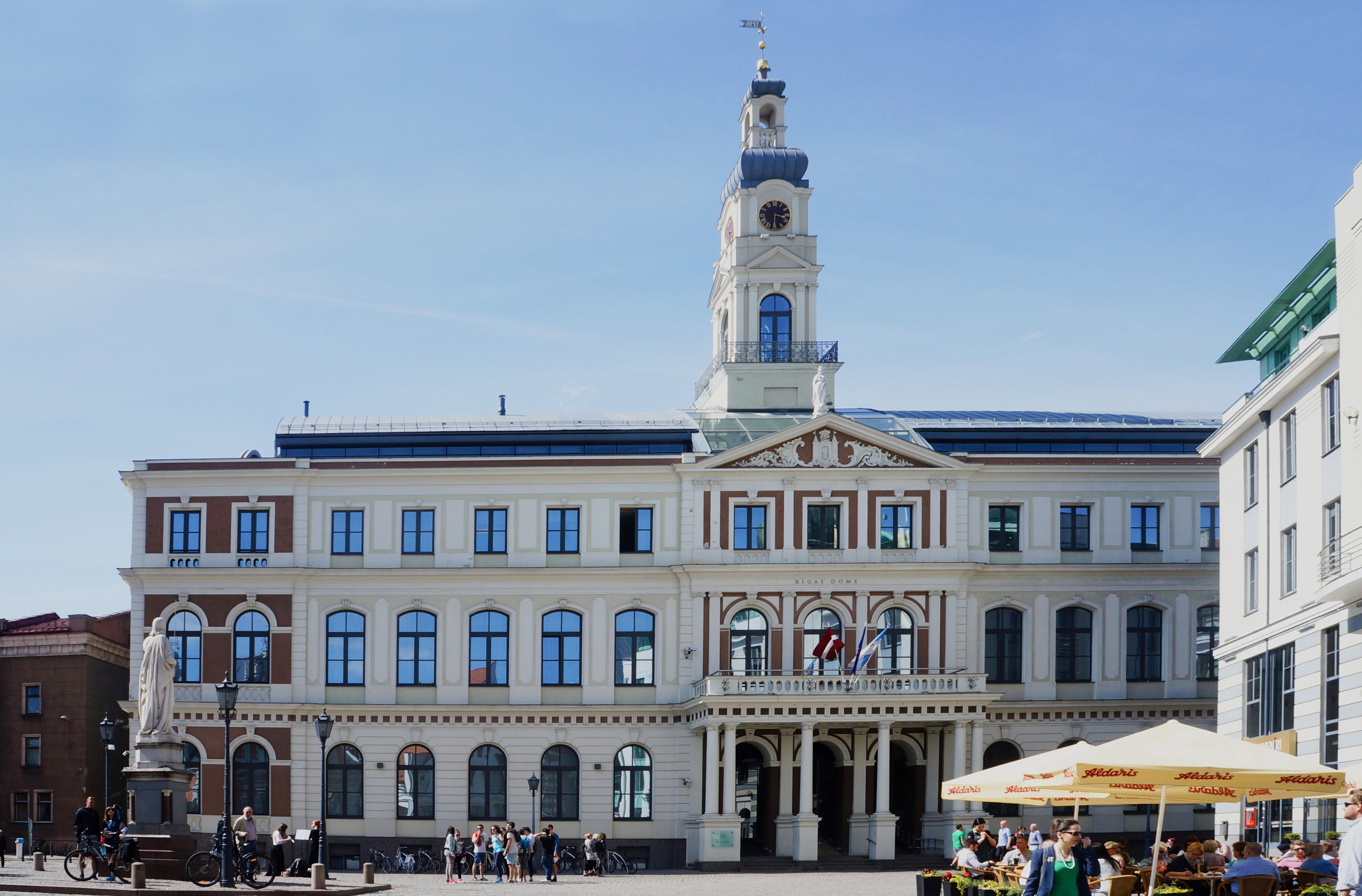
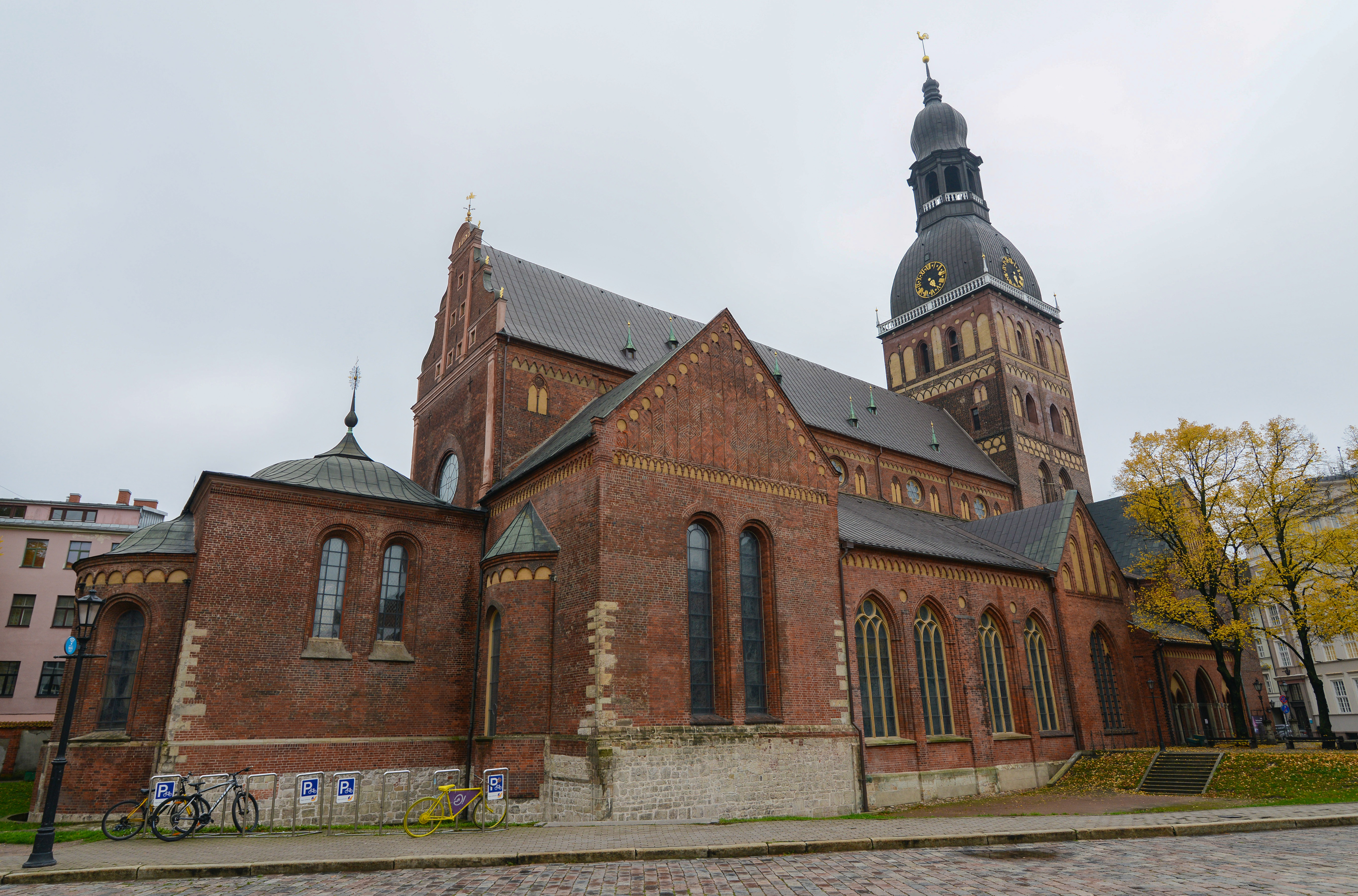
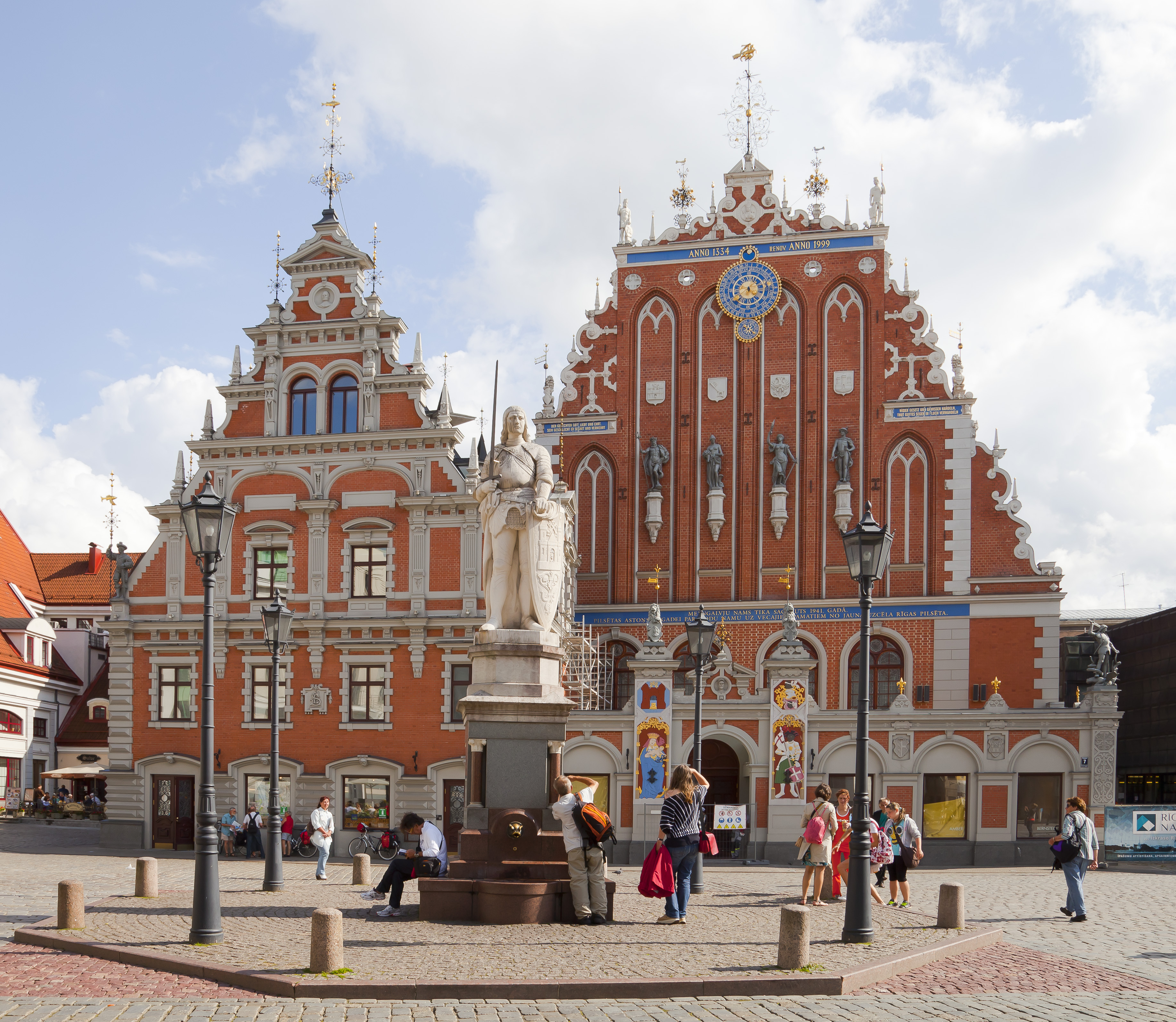
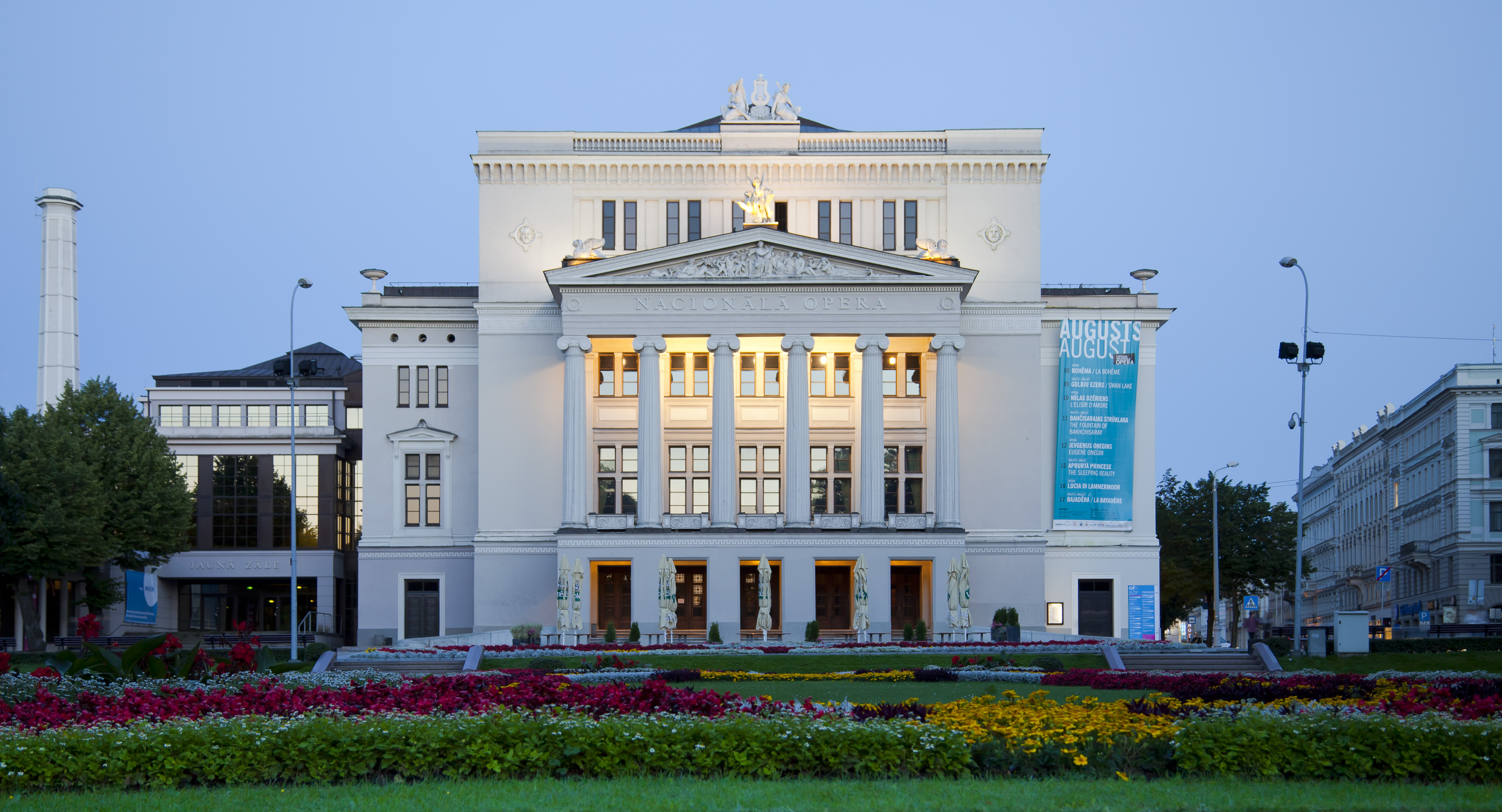
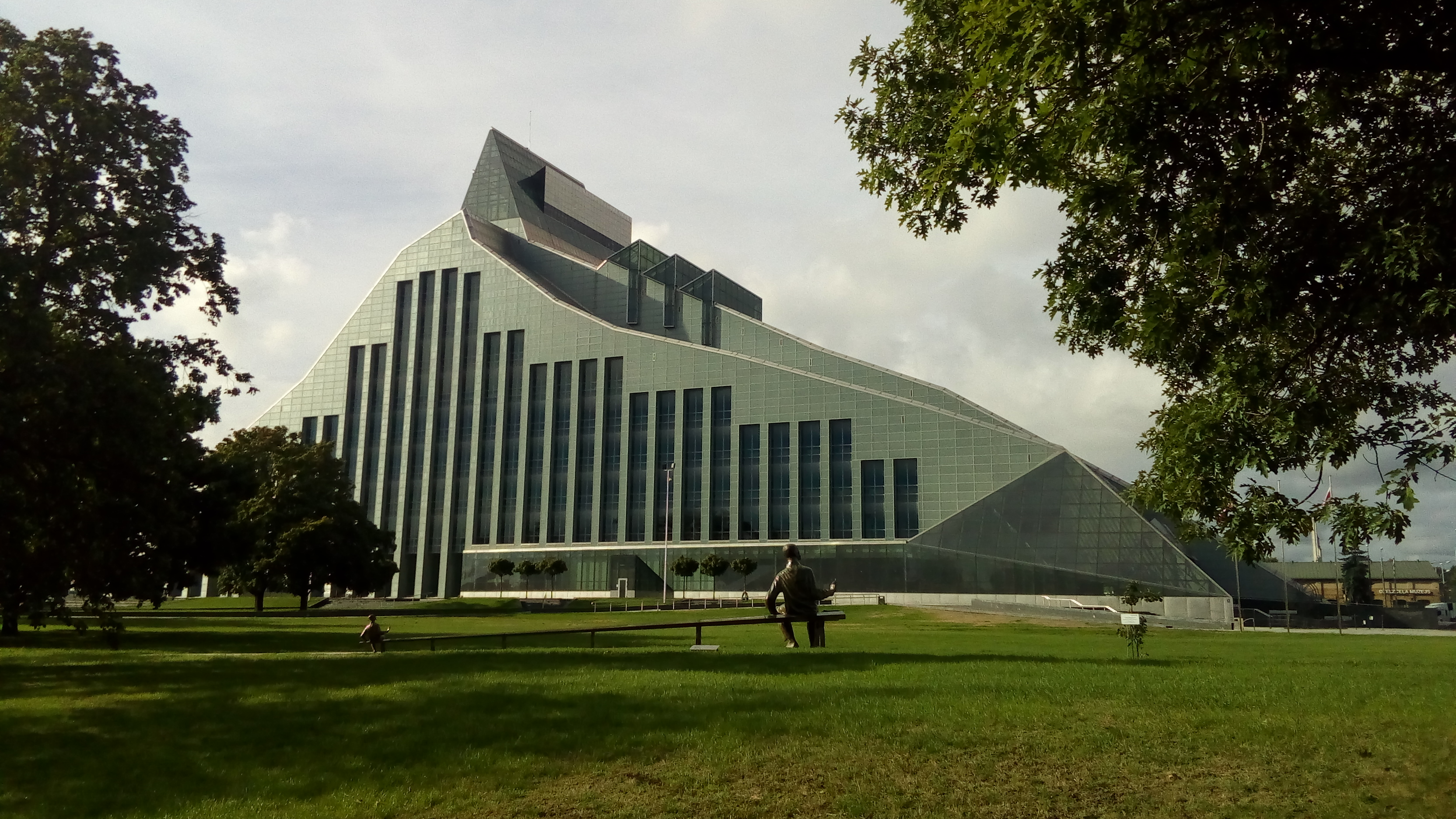
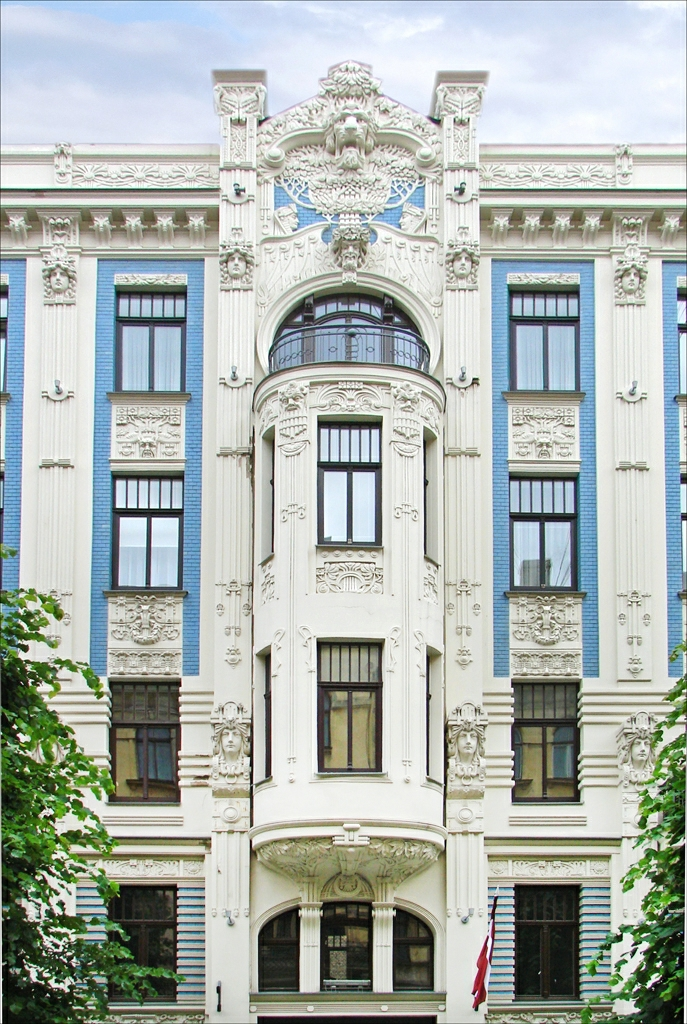
- Skyline of the Riga Old Town alongside Daugava from the Spire of the St. Peter's Church Riga City Hall Riga Cathedral House of the Blackheads Latvian National Opera National Library of Latvia Albert Street 8

- Flag Coat of arms Brandmark

- Riga highlighted in red inside of Latvia
- Interactive map of Riga
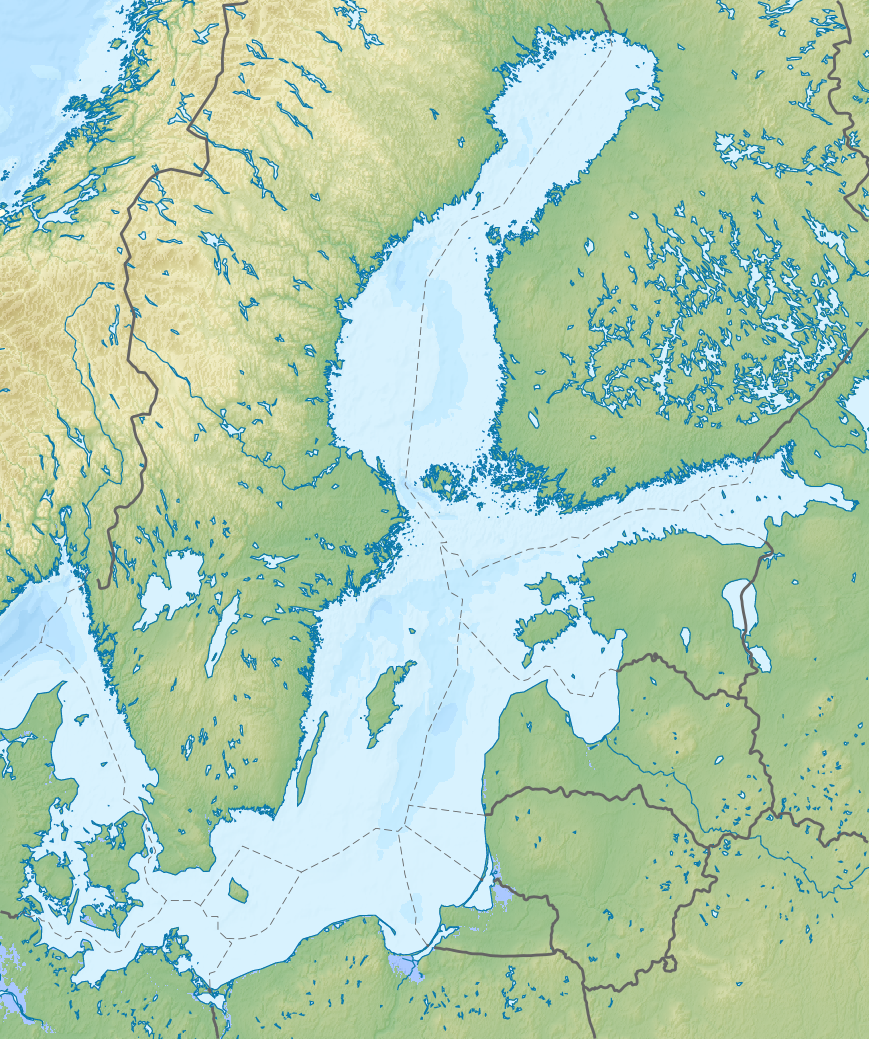
- Location within Latvia Location within the Baltic Sea Location within Europe
- Coordinates: 56°56′56″N 24°6′23″E
- Country: Latvia
- First mentioned: 1201
- Granted city rights: 1225

Government
  - Type: City Council
  - Mayor: Viesturs Kleinbergs (P)

Area
  - Capital city and state city: 304 km^{2} (117 sq mi)
  - Land: 253.60 km^{2} (97.92 sq mi)
  - Water: 50.4 km^{2} (19.5 sq mi) 15.8%
  - Metro: 3,359 km^{2} (1,297 sq mi)

Population (2026)
  - Capital city and state city: 588,911
  - Rank: 1st
  - Density: 2,322.2/km^{2} (6,014.5/sq mi)
  - Urban: 615,764
  - Metro: 860,142
  - Metro density: 256.1/km^{2} (663.2/sq mi)
  - Demonym: Rigan (Rīdzinieks)

GDP
  - Capital city and state city: €20.79 billion (US$23.47 billion) (2023)
  - Per capita: €34,401 (US$38,827.31) (2023)
- Time zone: UTC+2 (EET)
  - Summer (DST): UTC+3 (EEST)
- Calling codes: 66 and 67
- City budget: €1.7 billion (2025)
- HDI (2022): 0.937 – very high
- Website: riga.lv

UNESCO World Heritage Site
- Official name: Historic Centre of Riga
- Type: Cultural
- Criteria: ii, i
- Designated: 1997
- Reference no.
- UNESCO region: Europe

Riga (/ˈriːɡə/ REE-gə), (Note: Latvian: Rīga [ˈrʲiːɡɐ]; Latgalian: Reiga [ˈrɛɪ̯gɐ] Livonian: Rīgõ [ˈriːɡə]; German: Riga [ˈʁiːɡaː]; Russian: Рига [ˈrʲigə]) officially Riga State City (Latvian: Rīgas valstspilsēta), is the capital, primate, and largest city of Latvia and the second most-populous city in the Baltics. Home to 588,911 inhabitants (as of 2026), the city accounts for a third of Latvia's total population. The population of Riga metropolitan area, which stretches beyond the city limits, is estimated at 847,162 (as of 2025). The city lies on the Gulf of Riga at the mouth of the Daugava river where it meets the Baltic Sea. Riga's territory covers 307.17 km^{2} (118.60 sq mi) and lies 1–10 m (3–33 ft) above sea level on a flat and sandy plain.

Riga was founded in 1201, and is a former Hanseatic League member. Riga's historical centre is a UNESCO World Heritage Site, noted for its Art Nouveau architecture and 19th century wooden architecture. Riga was the European Capital of Culture in 2014, along with Umeå in Sweden. Riga hosted the 2006 NATO Summit, the Eurovision Song Contest 2003, the 2013 World Women's Curling Championship, and the IIHF Men's World Ice Hockey Championships in 2006, 2021, and 2023. It is home to the European Union's office of European Regulators for Electronic Communications (BEREC). In 2017, it was named as the European Region of Gastronomy.

In 2019, Riga received over 1.4 million foreign visitors. The city is served by Riga International Airport, the largest and busiest airport in the Baltic States. Riga is a member of Eurocities, the Union of the Baltic Cities (UBC), and Union of Capitals of the European Union (UCEU).

== Etymology ==
The precise origin of the name is unknown; however, there are numerous and speculative theories for the origin of the name Riga:

- It could be derived from Riege, the German name for the River Rīdzene, a former tributary of the Daugava.
- Bishop Albert claimed credit from his campaign to conquer and convert the local populace, as coming from the Latin rigata ("irrigated"), symbolising an "irrigation of dry pagan souls by Christianity".

Nonetheless, the most reliably documented explanation is the affirmation by German historian Dionysius Fabricius (1610) that Riga's name comes from its already established role in trade: "Riga obtained its name from the buildings or warehouses found in great number along the banks of the Duna, which the Livs in their own language are accustomed to call Riae". (Note: Latin original: "Riga nomen sortita est suum ab aedificiis vel horreis quorum a litus Dunae magna fuit copia, quas livones sua lingua Rias vocare soliti".) The "j" in Latvian rīja hardened to a "g" in German. English geographer Richard Hakluyt (1589) corroborates this account, calling Riga as Rie, as pronounced in Old Latvian. This is further supported by the fact that Riga is called Riia in Estonian (a language closely related to Livonian).

== History ==
Historical affiliations

Archbishopric of Riga (vassal state of the Holy Roman Empire) 1201–1561
Free City of Riga 1561–1582
Polish–Lithuanian Commonwealth 1582–1621
Swedish Empire 1621–1710
Russian Empire 1710–1917
German Empire 1917–1918
Republic of Latvia 1918–1940
Latvian SSR 1940–1941
Nazi Germany 1941–1944
(Latvian Soviet Socialist Republic) Latvian SSR 1944–1990
Republic of Latvia 1990–present

=== Founding ===
The river Daugava has been a trade route since antiquity, part of the Vikings' Dvina–Dnieper navigation route to Byzantium. A sheltered natural harbor 15 km (9.3 mi) upriver from the mouth of the Daugava—the site of today's Riga—has been recorded, as Duna Urbs, as early as the 2nd century. It was settled by the Livs, a Finnic tribe. Riga began to develop as a centre of Viking trade during the early Middle Ages. Riga's inhabitants engaged mainly in fishing, animal husbandry, and trading, later developing crafts, including bone, wood, amber, and iron.

The Livonian Chronicle of Henry testifies to Riga having long been a trading centre by the 12th century, referring to it as portus antiquus (ancient port), and describes dwellings and warehouses used to store mostly flax and hides. German traders began visiting Riga, establishing a nearby outpost in 1158.

Along with German traders, the monk Meinhard of Segeberg arrived to convert the Livonian pagans to Christianity. Catholic and Orthodox Christianity had already arrived in Latvia more than a century earlier, and many Latvians had been baptized. Meinhard settled among the Livs, building a castle and church at Uexküll (now known as Ikšķile), upstream from Riga, and established his bishopric there. The Livs, however, continued to practice paganism and Meinhard died in Uexküll in 1196, having failed in his mission. In 1198, the Bishop Berthold arrived with a contingent of crusaders and commenced a campaign of forced Christianization. Berthold died soon afterwards and his forces were defeated.

The Church mobilized to avenge this defeat. Pope Innocent III issued a bull declaring a crusade against the Livonians. Bishop Albert was proclaimed Bishop of Livonia by his uncle Hartwig of Uthlede, Prince-Archbishop of Bremen and Hamburg in 1199. Albert landed in Riga in 1200 with 23 ships and 500 Westphalian crusaders. In 1201, he transferred the seat of the Livonian bishopric from Uexküll to Riga, extorting agreement to do this from the elders of Riga by force.

=== Under Bishop Albert ===
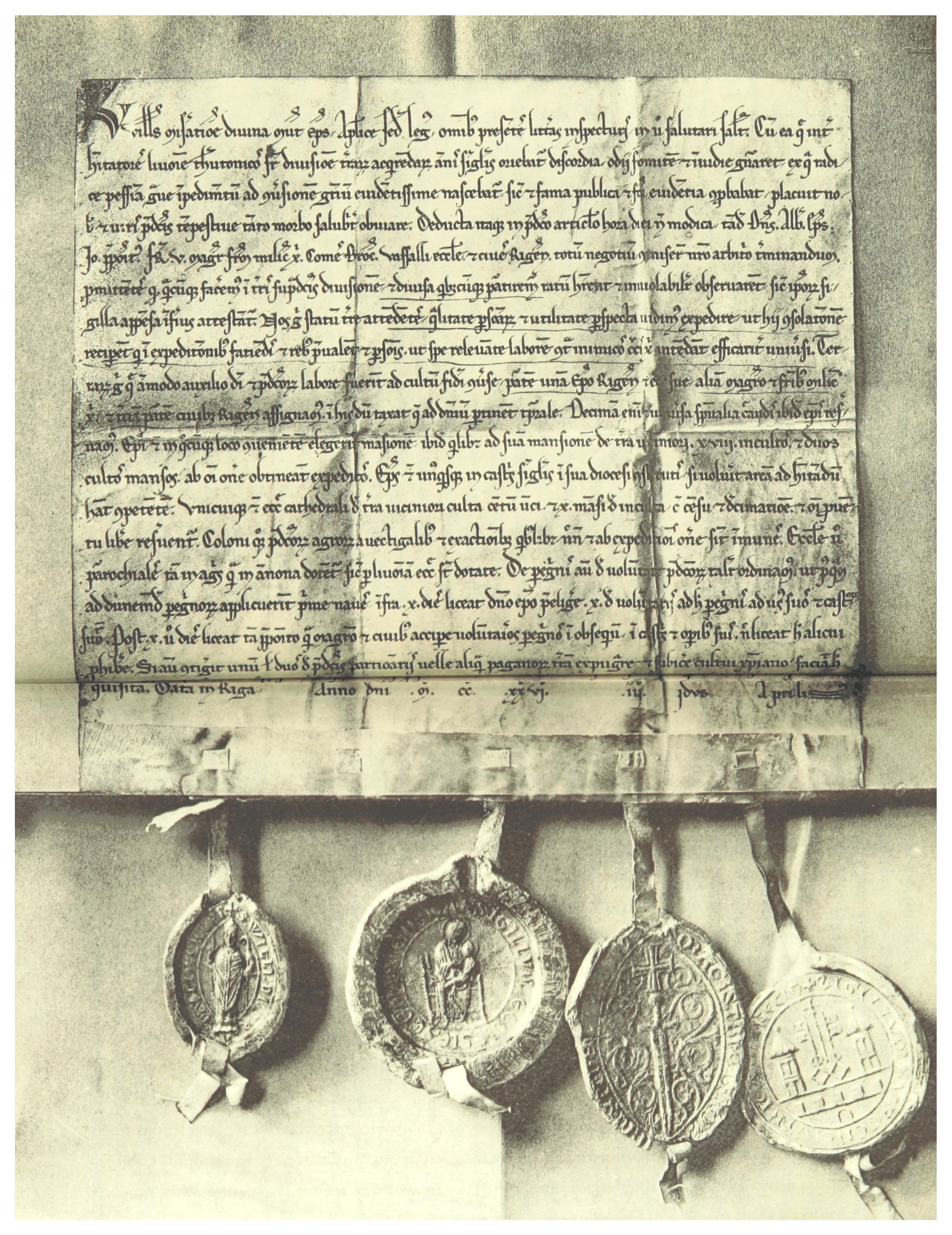
Document with the seals of the Livonian Brothers of the Sword and the city of Riga, 1226

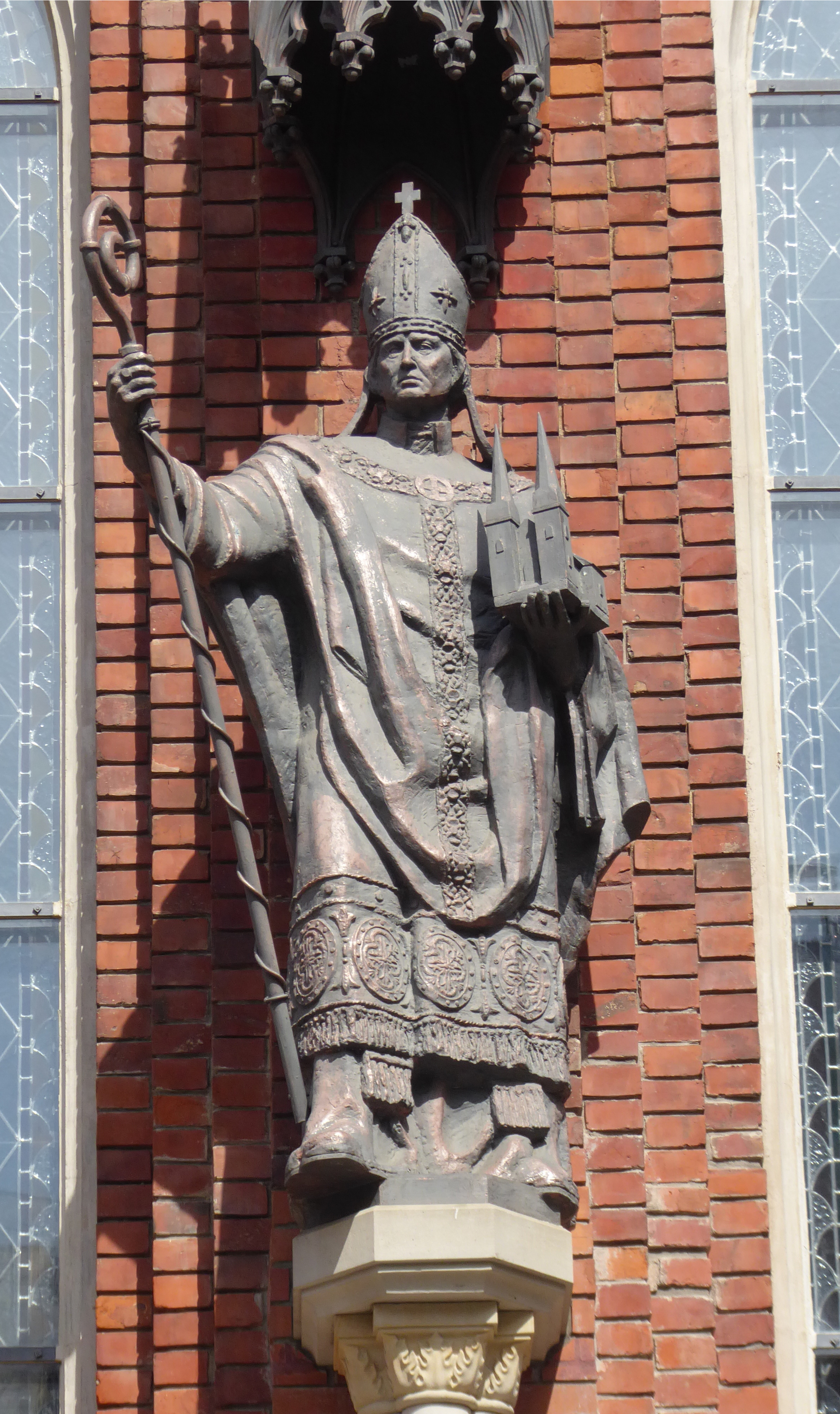
Statue of Bishop Albert of Riga on the exterior of the Riga Cathedral

The year 1201 also marked the first arrival of German merchants in Novgorod, via the Dvina. To defend territory and trade, Albert established the Order of Livonian Brothers of the Sword in 1202, which was open to nobles and merchants.

The Christianisation of the Livs continued. In 1207, Albert started to fortify the town. King Philip invested Albert with Livonia as a fief and principality of the Holy Roman Empire. To promote a permanent military presence, territorial ownership was divided between the Church and the Order, with the Church taking Riga and two-thirds of all lands conquered and granting the Order a third. Until then, it had been customary for crusaders to serve for a year and then return home.

Albert had ensured Riga's commercial future by obtaining papal bulls which decreed that all German merchants had to carry on their Baltic trade through Riga. In 1211, Riga minted its first coinage, and Albert laid the cornerstone for the Riga Dom. Riga was not yet secure as an alliance of tribes failed to take Riga. In 1212, Albert led a campaign to compel the Principality of Polotsk to grant German merchants free river passage. Polotsk conceded Kukenois (Koknese) and Jersika to Albert, also ending the Livs' tribute to Polotsk.

Riga's merchant citizenry chafed and sought greater autonomy from the Church. In 1221, they acquired the right to independently self-administer Riga and adopted a city constitution.

That same year Albert was compelled to recognise Danish rule over lands they had conquered in Estonia and Livonia. Albert had sought the aid of King Valdemar of Denmark to protect Riga and Livonian lands against Liv insurrection when reinforcements could not reach Riga. The Danes landed in Livonia, built a fortress at Reval (Tallinn) and set about conquering Estonian and Livonian lands. The Germans attempted, but failed, to assassinate Valdemar. Albert was able to reach accommodation with them a year later, however, and in 1222 Valdemar returned all Livonian lands and possessions to Albert's control.

Albert's difficulties with Riga's citizenry continued; with papal intervention, a settlement was reached in 1225 whereby they no longer had to pay tax to the Bishop of Riga, and Riga's citizens acquired the right to elect their magistrates and town councillors. In 1226, Albert consecrated the Dom Cathedral, built St. James's Church, (now a cathedral) and founded a parochial school at the Church of St. George.

In 1227, Albert conquered Oesel and the city of Riga concluded a treaty with the Principality of Smolensk giving Polotsk to Riga.

Albert died in January 1229. He failed in his aspiration to be anointed archbishop but the German hegemony he established over the Livonia would last for seven centuries.

=== Hanseatic League ===
In 1282, Riga became a member of the Hanseatic League. The Hansa was instrumental in giving Riga economic and political stability, thus providing the city with a strong foundation which endured the political conflagrations that were to come, down to modern times.

=== Holy Roman Empire, Polish–Lithuanian Commonwealth, the Swedish and Russian Empires ===
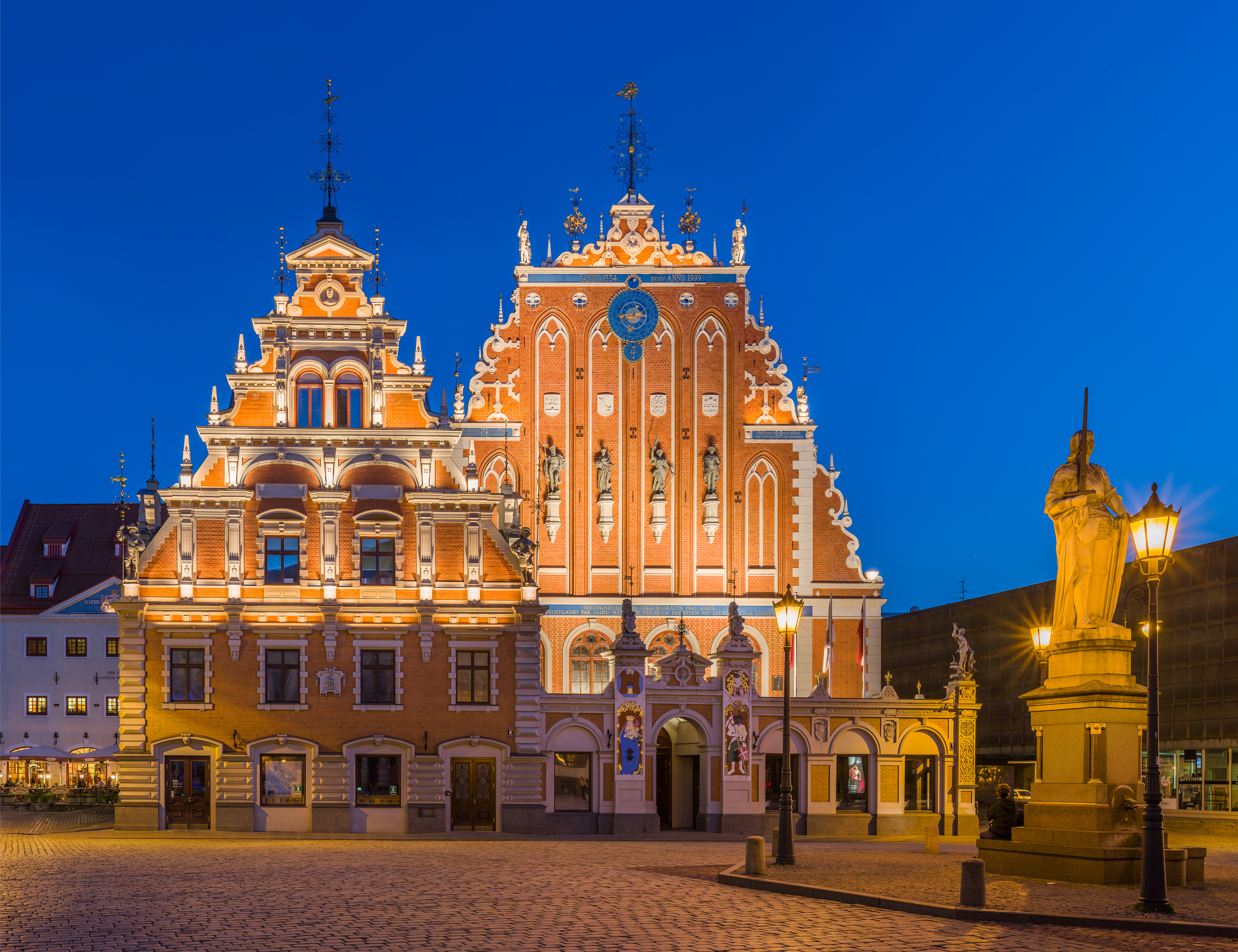
The building of the Brotherhood of Blackheads is one of the most iconic buildings of Old Riga (Vecrīga).

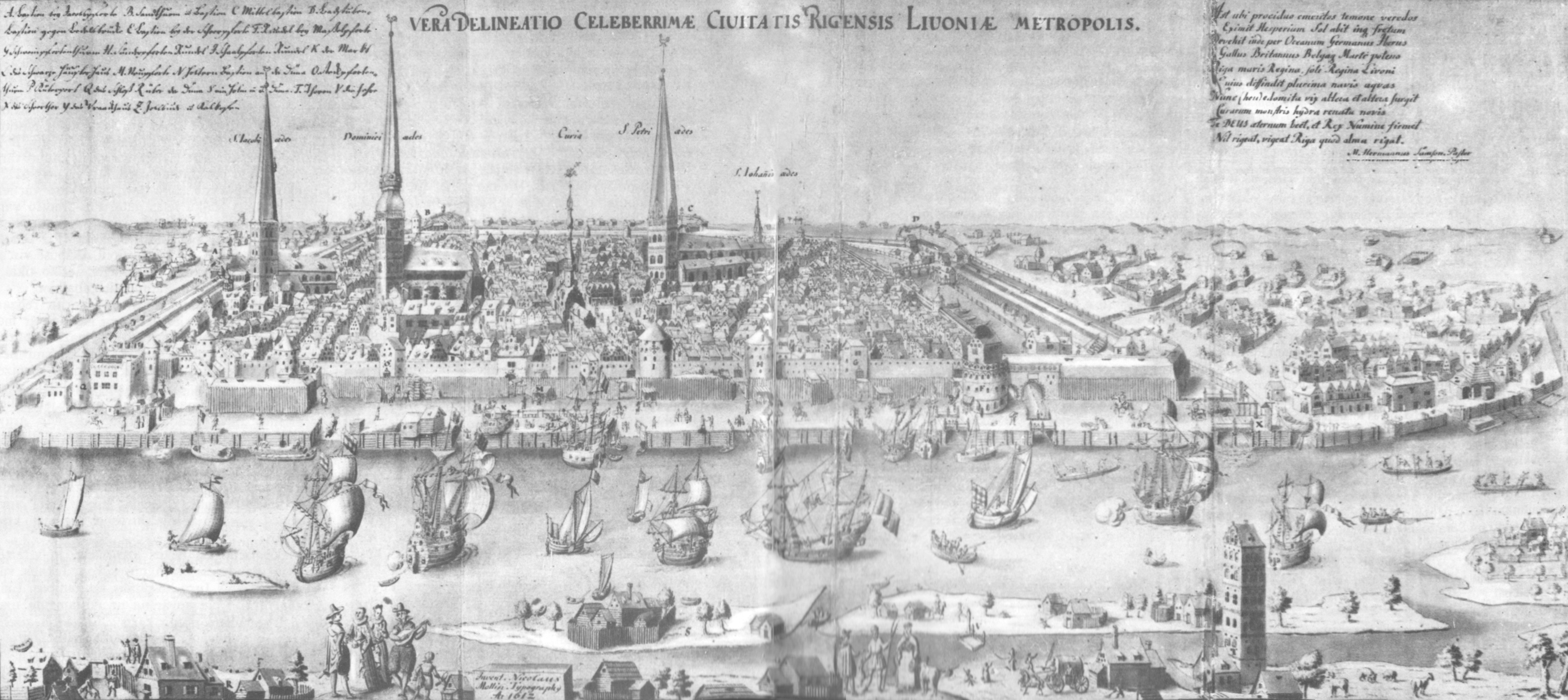
View of Riga from 1612, printed by Nikolaus Mollyn, the first book printer of the city.

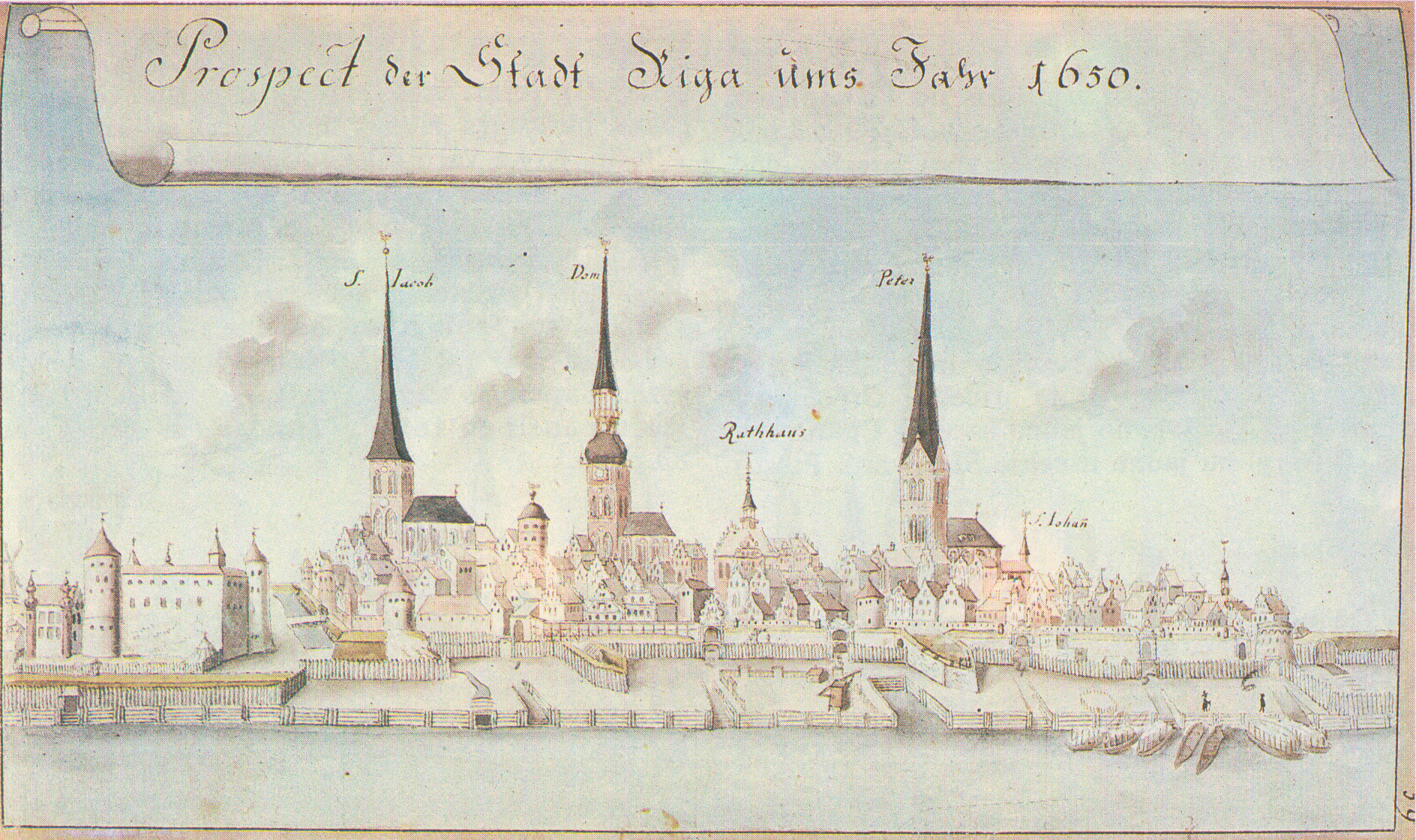
Riga in 1650. Drawing by Johann Christoph Brotze.

Map of Riga (around 1710)

As the influence of the Hanseatic League waned, Riga became the object of foreign military, political, religious and economic aspirations. Riga accepted the Reformation in 1522, ending the power of the archbishops. In 1524, iconoclasts during iconoclast riots targeted a statue of the Virgin Mary in the cathedral to make a statement against religious icons. It was accused of being a witch, and given a trial by water in the Daugava river. The statue floated, so it was denounced as a witch and burnt at Kubsberg. With the demise of the Livonian Order (1561) during the Livonian War, Riga for twenty years had the status of a free imperial city of the Holy Roman Empire before it came under the influence of the Polish–Lithuanian Commonwealth by the Treaty of Drohiczyn, which ended the war for Riga in 1581. In 1621, during the Polish–Swedish War (1621–1625), Riga and the outlying fortress of Daugavgrīva came under the rule of Gustavus Adolphus, King of Sweden, who intervened in the Thirty Years' War not only for political and economic gain but also in favour of German Lutheran Protestantism. During the Russo-Swedish War (1656–1658), Riga withstood a siege by Russian forces.

Riga remained one of the largest cities under the Swedish crown until 1710, a period during which the city retained a great deal of autonomous self-government. In July 1701, during the opening phase of the Great Northern War, the Crossing of the Düna took place nearby, resulting in a victory for king Charles XII of Sweden. Between November 1709 and June 1710, however, the Russians under Tsar Peter the Great besieged and captured Riga, which was at the time struck by a plague. Along with the other Livonian towns and gentry, Riga capitulated to Russia, but largely retained their privileges. Riga was made the capital of the Governorate of Riga (later, Livonia). Sweden's northern dominance had ended, and Russia's emergence as the strongest Northern power was formalised through the Treaty of Nystad in 1721. At the beginning of the 20th century, Riga was the largest timber export port in the Russian Empire and ranked the 3rd according to the external trade volume.

During these many centuries of war and changes of power in the Baltic, and despite demographic changes, the Baltic Germans in Riga had maintained a dominant position. By 1867, Riga's population was 42.9% German. Riga employed German as its official language of administration until the installation of Russian in 1891 as the official language in the Baltic provinces, as part of the policy of Russification of the non-Russian-speaking territories of the Russian Empire, including Congress Poland, Finland and the Baltics, undertaken by Tsar Alexander III. More and more Latvians started moving to the city during the mid-19th century. The rise of a Latvian bourgeoisie made Riga a centre of the Latvian National Awakening with the founding of the Riga Latvian Association in 1868 and the organisation of the first national song festival in 1873. In 1897, Riga was the sixth largest city in the Russian Empire. The nationalist movement of the Neo-Latvians was followed by the socialist New Current during the city's rapid industrialisation, culminating in the 1905 Revolution led by the Latvian Social Democratic Workers' Party.

=== World War I ===
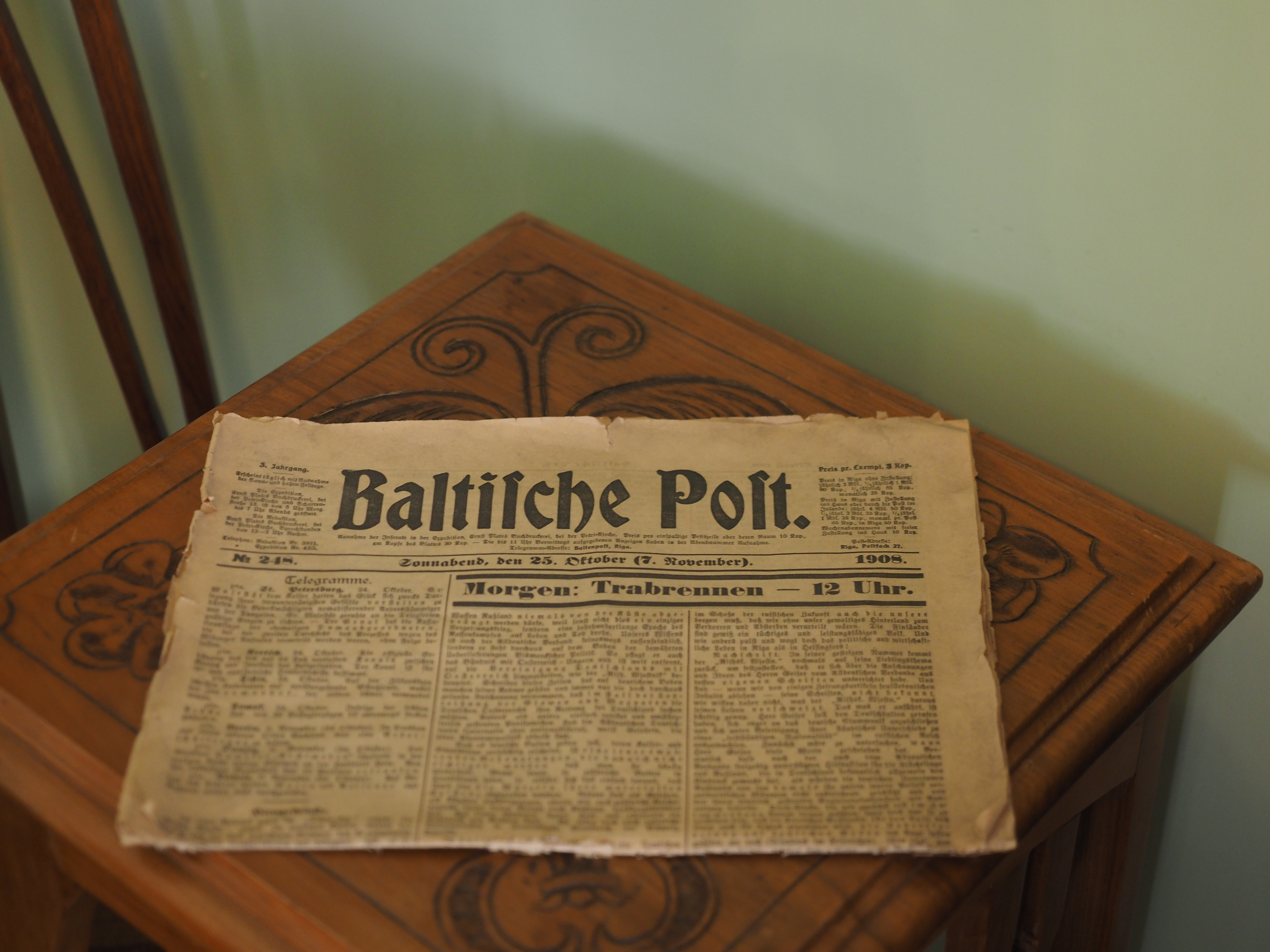
Baltische Post (written with long s) was a German language newspaper in Riga during the early 20th century.

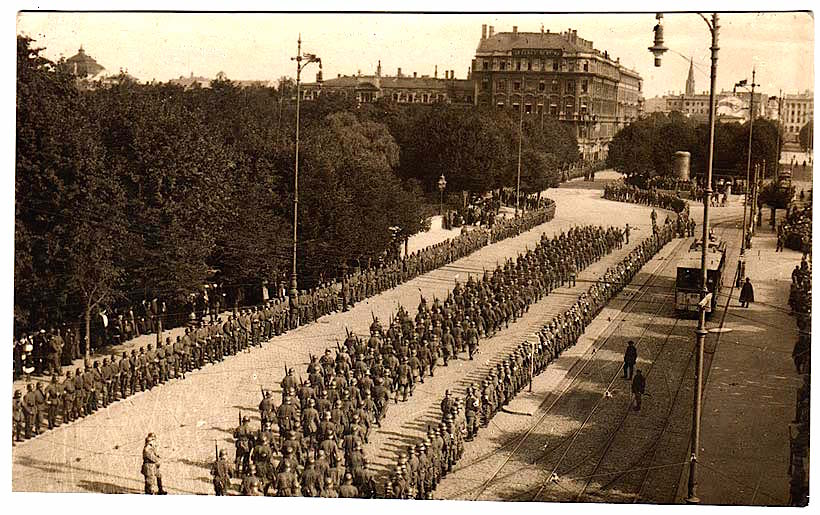
German troops entering Riga during World War I

The 20th century brought World War I and the impact of the Russian Revolution of 1917 to Riga. As a result of the battle of Jugla, the German army marched into Riga on 3 September 1917. On 3 March 1918, the Treaty of Brest-Litovsk was signed, giving the Baltic countries to Germany. Because of the armistice with Germany of 11 November 1918, Germany had to renounce that treaty, as did Russia, leaving Latvia and the other Baltic States in a position to claim independence. Latvia, with Riga as its capital city, thus declared its independence on 18 November 1918. Between World War I and World War II (1918–1940), Riga and Latvia shifted their focus from Russia to the countries of Western Europe. The United Kingdom and Germany replaced Russia as Latvia's major trade partners. The majority of the Baltic Germans were resettled in late 1939, prior to the occupation of Estonia and Latvia by the Soviet Union in June 1940.

=== World War II and Soviet era ===
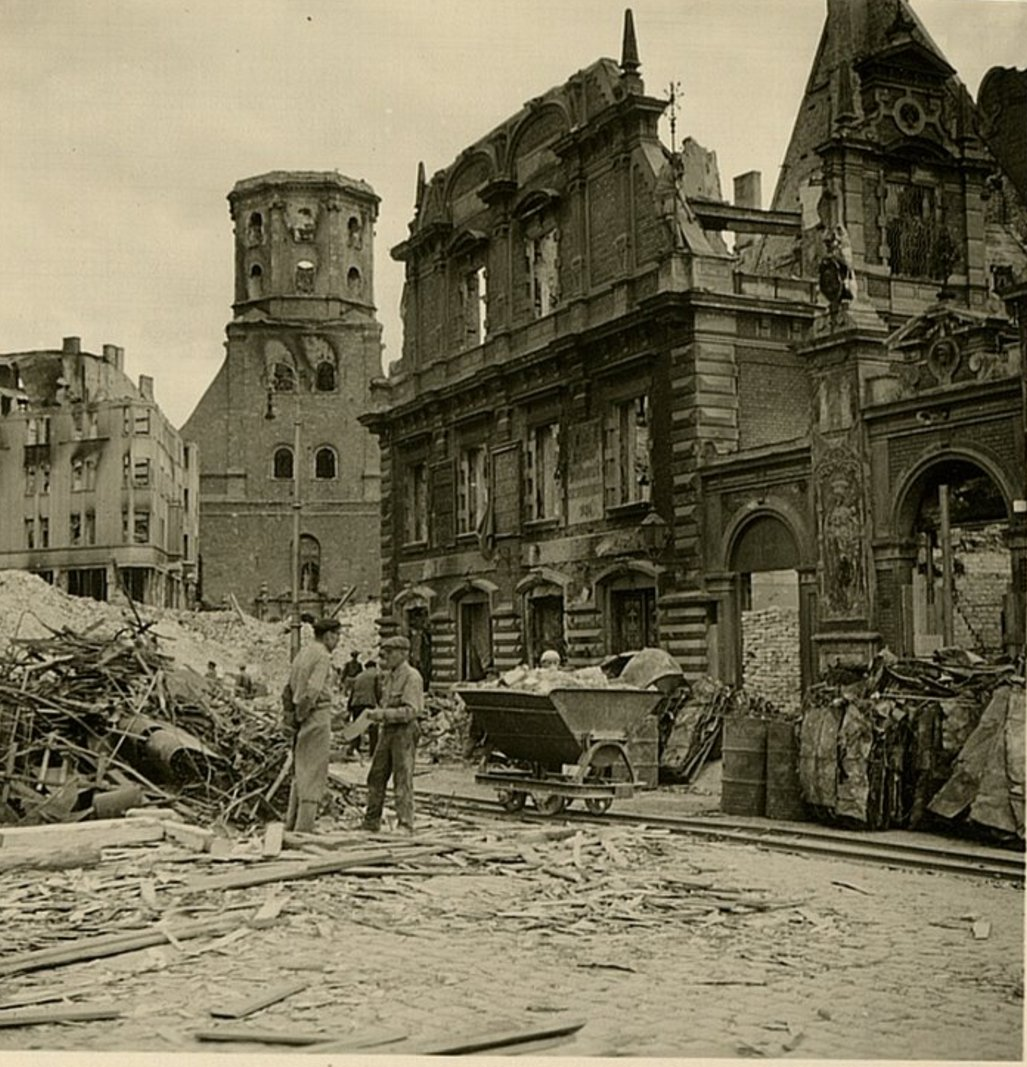
Damaged House of the Blackheads and St. Peter's Church during World War II

During World War II, Latvia was occupied by the Soviet Union in June 1940 and then was occupied by Nazi Germany in 1941–1944. On 17 June 1940, the Soviet forces invaded Latvia occupying bridges, post/telephone, telegraph, and broadcasting offices. Three days later, Latvian president Kārlis Ulmanis was forced to approve a pro-Soviet government which had taken office. On 14–15 July, rigged elections were held in Latvia and the other Baltic states, The ballots held the following instructions: "Only the list of the Latvian Working People's Bloc must be deposited in the ballot box. The ballot must be deposited without any changes." The alleged voter activity index was 97.6%. Most notably, the complete election results were published in Moscow 12 hours before the election closed. Soviet electoral documents found later substantiated that the results were completely fabricated. The Soviet authorities, having regained control over Riga and Latvia imposed a regime of terror, opening the headquarters of the KGB, massive deportations started. Hundreds of men were arrested, including leaders of the former Latvian government. The most notorious deportation, the June deportation, took place on 13 and 14 June 1941, estimated at 15,600 men, women, and children, and including 20% of Latvia's last legal government. Similar deportations were repeated after the end of World War II. The building of the KGB located at 61 Brīvības iela, known as 'the corner house', is now a museum. Stalin's deportations also included thousands of Latvian Jews. The mass deportation totalled 131,500 across the Baltics.

During the Nazi occupation, the Jewish community was forced into the Riga Ghetto and a Nazi concentration camp was constructed in Kaiserwald. On 25 October 1941, the Nazis relocated all Jews from Riga and the vicinity to the ghetto. Most of Latvia's Jews (about 24,000) were killed on 30 November and 8 December 1941 in the Rumbula massacre. By the end of the war, the remaining Baltic Germans were expelled to Germany.

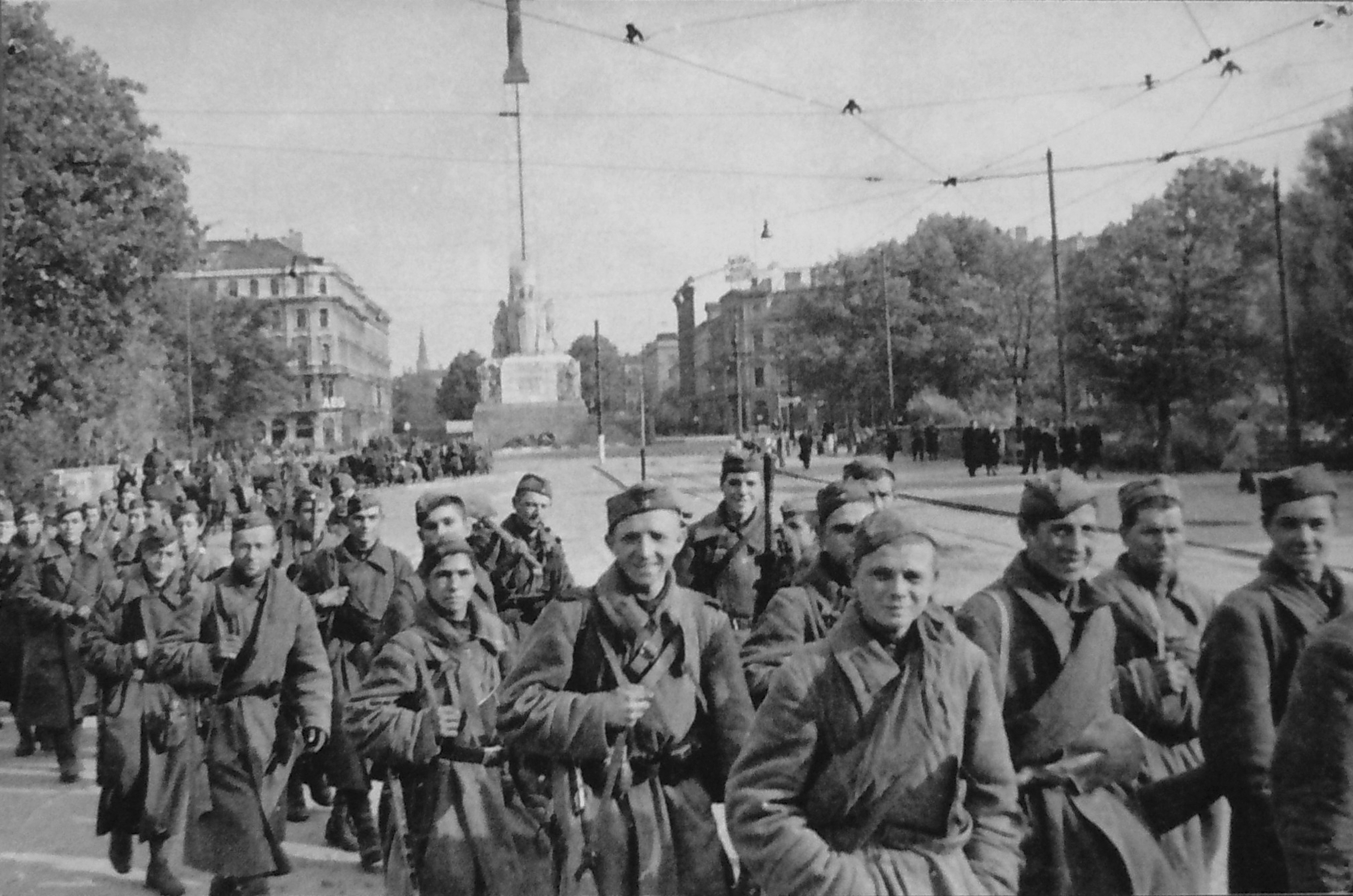
Soldiers of the Soviet Red Army in front of the Freedom Monument in Riga in 1944

The Soviet Red Army reconquered Riga on 13 October 1944. In the following years the massive influx of labourers, administrators, military personnel, and their dependents from Russia and other Soviet republics started. Microdistricts of the large multi-storied housing blocks were built to house immigrant workers.

By the end of World War II, Riga's historical centre was heavily damaged from constant bombing. After the war, huge efforts were made to reconstruct and renovate most of the famous buildings that had been part of the skyline of the city before the war. Such buildings were, amongst others, St. Peter's Church which lost its wooden tower after a fire caused by the Wehrmacht (renovated in 1954). Another example is the House of the Blackheads, completely destroyed, its ruins subsequently demolished; a facsimile was constructed in 1995.

In 1989, the percentage of Latvians in Riga had fallen to 36.5%.

=== 21st century ===
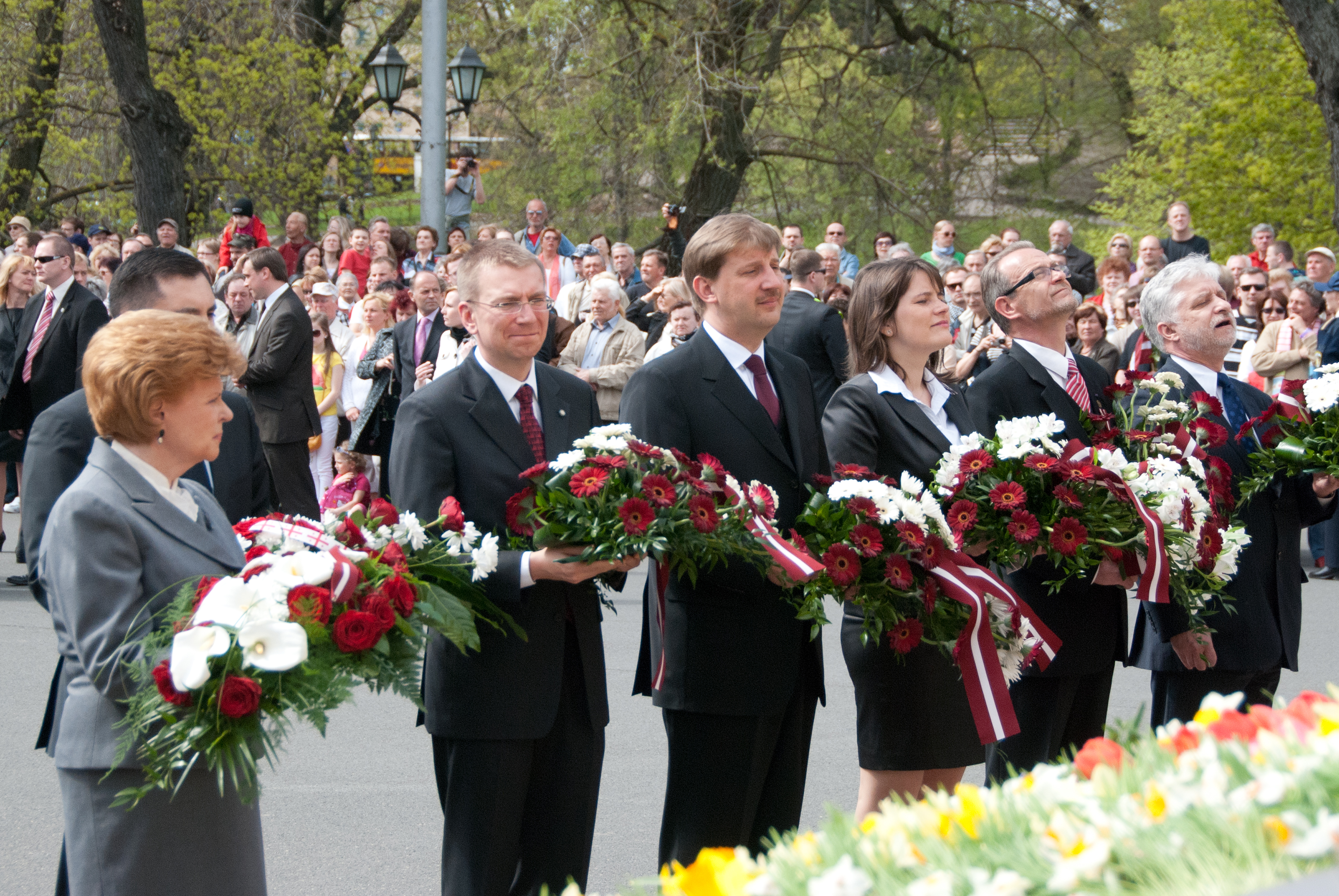
Flower laying ceremony at the Freedom Monument in 2012

In 2004, the arrival of low-cost airlines resulted in cheaper flights from other European cities such as London and Berlin, and consequently a substantial increase in numbers of tourists.

On 21 November 2013, the roof of a supermarket collapsed in Zolitūde, one of the neighbourhoods of the city, possibly as a result of the weight of materials used in the construction of a garden on the roof. Fifty-four people were killed. Latvian President Andris Bērziņš described the disaster as "a large-scale murder of many defenceless people".

Riga was the European Capital of Culture in 2014. During Latvia's Presidency of the Council of the European Union in 2015, the 4th Eastern Partnership Summit took place in Riga.

Following the 2022 Russian invasion of Ukraine, the Saeima voted to suspend the functioning of a section of an agreement between Latvia and Russia regarding the preservation of memorial structures on 12 May, in the next day the Riga City Council also voted to demolish the Monument to the Liberators of Soviet Latvia and Riga from the German Fascist Invaders. On 20 May, a rally called "Getting Rid of Soviet Heritage" took place in Riga to call for removing Soviet monuments in Latvia, it was attended by approximately 5,000 people. The demolition began 22 August 2022 and on 25 August 2022, the obelisk was toppled. In 2022, after the Russian invasion of Ukraine, the street on which the Embassy of the Russian Federation is located was renamed "Independent Ukraine Street".

Despite legal changes, problems have arisen in the city in relation to large construction and reconstruction projects with developers increasingly looking for opportunities to use underground spaces. While this opens up the possibility for new archaeological research to be undertaken, it is decreasing in situ archaeological preservation.

== Geography ==
Riga is one of the largest cities in the three Baltic states (Lithuania, Latvia, and Estonia). Riga is home to approximately one tenth of the three Baltic countries' combined population.

=== Administrative divisions ===
- Central District (3 km^{2} or 1.2 sq mi)
- Kurzeme District (79 km^{2} or 31 sq mi)
- Zemgale Suburb (41 km^{2} or 16 sq mi)
- Northern District (77 km^{2} or 30 sq mi)
- Vidzeme Suburb (57 km^{2} or 22 sq mi)
- Latgale Suburb (50 km^{2} or 19 sq mi)

Riga's administrative divisions consist of six administrative entities: Central, Kurzeme and Northern districts and the Latgale, Vidzeme and Zemgale suburbs. Three entities were established on 1 September 1941, and the other three were established in October 1969. There are no official lower-level administrative units, but the Riga City Council Development Agency is working on a plan, which officially makes Riga consist of 58 neighbourhoods. The current names were confirmed on 28 December 1990.

Panorama over Riga from St. Peter's Church

=== Climate ===
The climate of Riga is humid continental (Köppen Dfb). The coldest months are January and February, when the average temperature is −2.1 °C (28 °F) but temperatures as low as −20 to −25 °C (−4 to −13 °F) can be observed almost every year on the coldest days. The proximity of the sea causes frequent autumn rains and fogs. Continuous snow cover may last eighty days. The summers in Riga are mild and rainy with an average temperature of 18 °C (64 °F), while the temperature on the hottest days can exceed 30 °C (86 °F).

Climate data for Riga (1991–2020 normals, extremes 1885–present)
Month	Jan	Feb	Mar	Apr	May	Jun	Jul	Aug	Sep	Oct	Nov	Dec	Year
Record high °C (°F)	10.2 (50.4)	13.6 (56.5)	21.7 (71.1)	28.0 (82.4)	30.5 (86.9)	34.0 (93.2)	34.5 (94.1)	33.9 (93.0)	29.4 (84.9)	23.4 (74.1)	17.2 (63.0)	11.8 (53.2)	34.5 (94.1)
Mean maximum °C (°F)	5.9 (42.6)	6.1 (43.0)	12.7 (54.9)	21.5 (70.7)	26.3 (79.3)	28.4 (83.1)	30.1 (86.2)	29.4 (84.9)	23.9 (75.0)	17.3 (63.1)	10.9 (51.6)	6.7 (44.1)	31.4 (88.5)
Mean daily maximum °C (°F)	−0.1 (31.8)	0.3 (32.5)	4.8 (40.6)	11.9 (53.4)	17.8 (64.0)	21.3 (70.3)	23.8 (74.8)	22.7 (72.9)	17.3 (63.1)	10.5 (50.9)	4.8 (40.6)	1.4 (34.5)	11.4 (52.5)
Daily mean °C (°F)	−2.1 (28.2)	−2.0 (28.4)	1.5 (34.7)	7.4 (45.3)	13.0 (55.4)	16.7 (62.1)	19.3 (66.7)	18.3 (64.9)	13.4 (56.1)	7.5 (45.5)	3.0 (37.4)	−0.3 (31.5)	8.0 (46.4)
Mean daily minimum °C (°F)	−4.5 (23.9)	−4.6 (23.7)	−1.7 (28.9)	2.9 (37.2)	8.2 (46.8)	12.4 (54.3)	14.9 (58.8)	14.1 (57.4)	9.8 (49.6)	4.9 (40.8)	1.1 (34.0)	−2.4 (27.7)	4.6 (40.3)
Mean minimum °C (°F)	−16.4 (2.5)	−15.8 (3.6)	−10.4 (13.3)	−3.9 (25.0)	0.2 (32.4)	5.3 (41.5)	9.3 (48.7)	8.0 (46.4)	3.0 (37.4)	−2.4 (27.7)	−6.5 (20.3)	−11.4 (11.5)	−20.3 (−4.5)
Record low °C (°F)	−33.7 (−28.7)	−34.9 (−30.8)	−30.3 (−22.5)	−13.1 (8.4)	−5.5 (22.1)	−2.3 (27.9)	4.0 (39.2)	0.0 (32.0)	−4.1 (24.6)	−9.5 (14.9)	−20.5 (−4.9)	−31.9 (−25.4)	−34.9 (−30.8)
Average precipitation mm (inches)	46.5 (1.83)	40.1 (1.58)	34.1 (1.34)	35.0 (1.38)	47.5 (1.87)	65.0 (2.56)	79.5 (3.13)	77.9 (3.07)	67.1 (2.64)	75.6 (2.98)	56.3 (2.22)	50.2 (1.98)	674.8 (26.58)
Average snowfall cm (inches)	25.0 (9.8)	23.6 (9.3)	15.7 (6.2)	5.2 (2.0)	0.0 (0.0)	0.0 (0.0)	0.0 (0.0)	0.0 (0.0)	0.0 (0.0)	1.2 (0.5)	7.0 (2.8)	22.0 (8.7)	99.7 (39.3)
Average precipitation days (≥ 1.0mm)	11	9	8	7	8	10	9	10	9	12	11	11	115
Average relative humidity (%)	85.9	82.4	76.0	68.2	66.3	69.1	71.0	73.2	78.5	83.1	87.2	87.4	77.4
Mean monthly sunshine hours	36.6	64.2	141.2	203.6	286.7	282.2	291.2	250.4	166.7	95.5	36.1	24.4	1,878.8
Average ultraviolet index	0	1	2	3	5	6	5	5	3	1	0	0	3
Source 1: Latvian Environment, Geology and Meteorology Agency (temperature, precipitation and sunshine)
Source 2: NOAA (precipitation days, humidity 1991–2020), Weather Atlas, and World Weather Online (snowfall)

Coastal temperature data for Riga (Daugavgrīva)
Month	Jan	Feb	Mar	Apr	May	Jun	Jul	Aug	Sep	Oct	Nov	Dec	Year
Average sea temperature °C (°F)	1.0 (33.80)	0.7 (33.26)	0.5 (32.90)	3.0 (37.40)	9.1 (48.38)	15.5 (59.90)	19.6 (67.28)	19.4 (66.92)	16.3 (61.34)	11.3 (52.34)	7.4 (45.32)	4.3 (39.74)	9.0 (48.21)
Source 1: Seatemperature.org

== Government ==
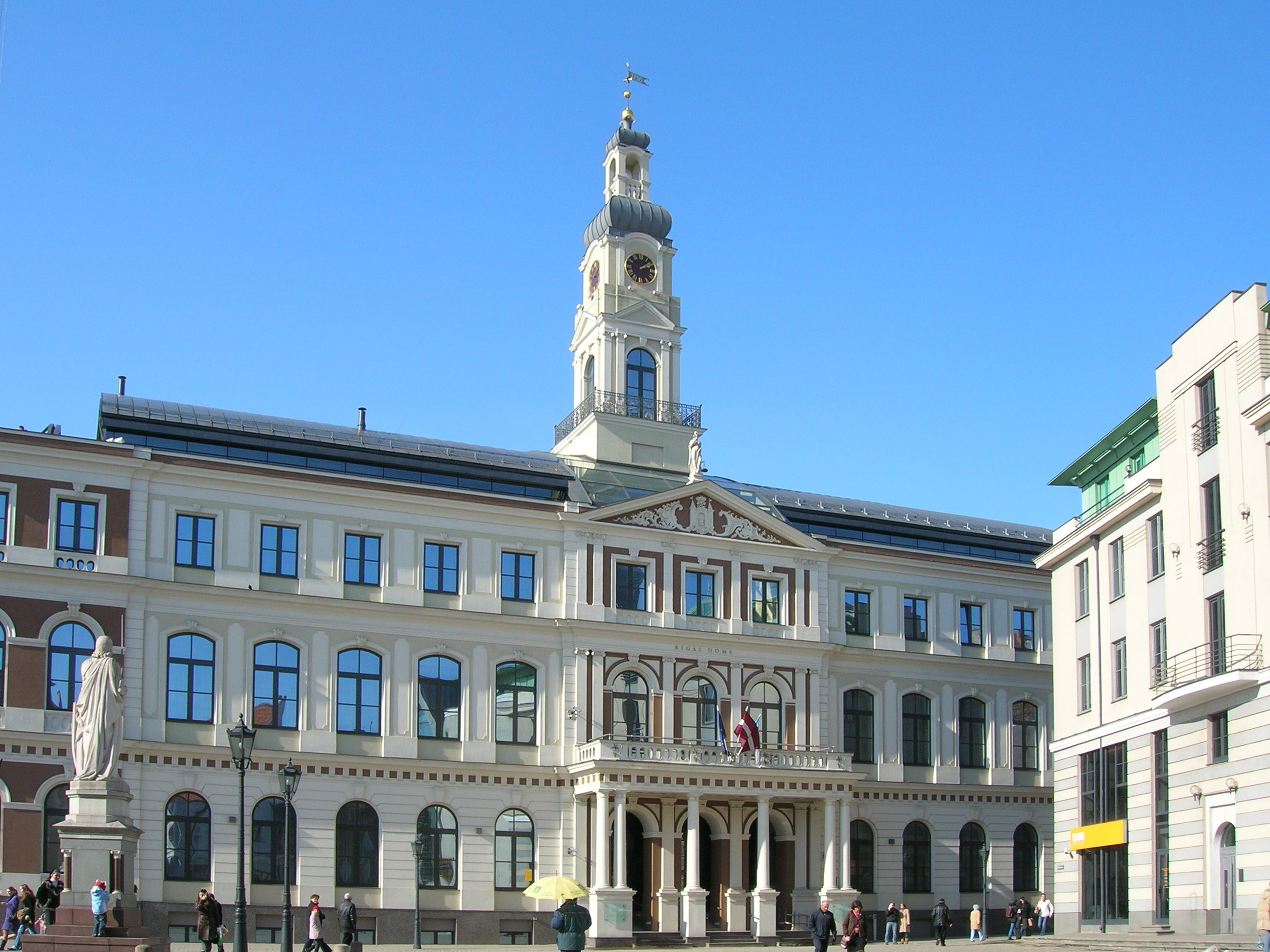
Riga City Council

The head of the city government of Riga (the Government of the State City of Riga, Latvian: Rīgas valstspilsētas pašvaldība) is the mayor (mērs), or officially the Chairman of the Riga State City Council (Latvian: Rīgas valstspilsētas domes priekšsēdētājs). The mayor is elected by the city council. The mayor is assisted by one or more Vice Mayors (deputy mayors).

The current mayor since 27 June 2025 is Viesturs Kleinbergs from The Progressives party. He leads a coalition of The Progressives, the National Alliance party, the New Unity alliance (their faction includes members of Movement For! party) and the United List alliance.

The city council is a democratically elected institution and is the final decision-making authority in the city. The Council consists of 60 members or deputies who are elected every four years. The Presidium of the Riga City Council consists of the Chairman of the Riga City Council and the representatives delegated by the political parties, alliances or electoral blocks elected to the City Council. The electoral list that surpass the 5% threshold then form according factions in the council.

From February to October 2020, the offices of the Mayor and Vice Mayors were suspended and the council itself had been dissolved and replaced by an interim administration of representatives from three governmental ministries until snap elections were held in 2020.

== Demographics ==
Riga population pyramid in 2022

Historical population
Year	Pop.	±%
1897	282,230	—
1920	185,137	−34.4%
1925	337,699	+82.4%
1930	377,917	+11.9%
1935	385,063	+1.9%
1959	580,423	+50.7%
1970	731,831	+26.1%
1979	835,475	+14.2%
1989	915,106	+9.5%
2000	764,329	−16.5%
2011	658,640	−13.8%
2021	614,618	−6.7%

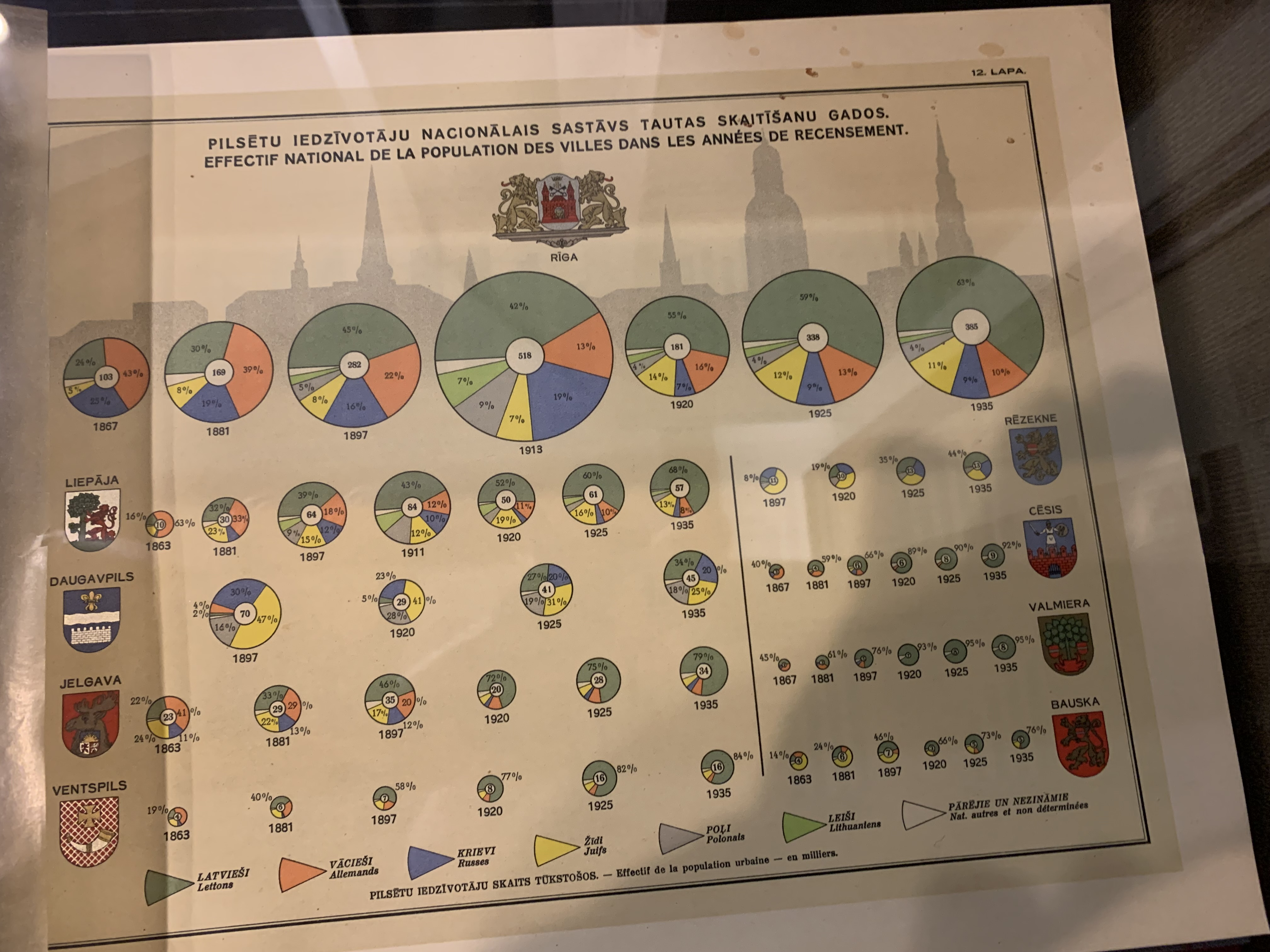
Ethnic Composition of Riga 1867–1935

With 591,882 inhabitants in 2025, Riga is one of the largest cities in the Baltic states, though its population has decreased from just over 900,000 in 1991 and the population of Vilnius has just outnumbered that of Riga. Notable causes include emigration and low birth rates. According to 2017 data, ethnic Latvians made up 44.03% of the population of Riga. Russians formed 37.88%, Belarusians 3.72%, Ukrainians 3.66%, Poles 1.83%, other ethnicities consisted 8.10%. By comparison, 62.7% of Latvia's total population was ethnically Latvian, 24.5% Russian, 3.1% Belarusian, 2.2% Ukrainian, 2.0% Polish, 5.5% are of other origins.

In contrast, just five years before the Soviet occupation of Latvia, according to the 1935 Census, when the population of Riga was 385,063 inhabitants, ethnic Latvians made up 63% of the city's population. In addition, Jews formed 11.3%, Germans 10%, Russians 7.4% and Poles 4.1%, other ethnicities consisted 4.2%.

Upon the restoration of Latvia's independence in 1991, Soviet-era immigrants (and any of their offspring born before 1991) were not automatically granted Latvian citizenship because they had migrated to the territory of Latvia during the years of Soviet occupation. The proportion of ethnic Latvians in Riga increased from 36.5% in 1989 to 47.4% in 2022. In contrast, the percentage of Russians fell from 47.3% to 35.7% in the same time period. In 2022 citizens of Latvia made up 79.0%, non-citizens 15.3% and citizens of other countries 5.6% of the population of Riga.

== Economy ==
Riga is one of the key economic and financial centres of the Baltic states. Roughly half of all the jobs in Latvia are in Riga and the city generates more than 50% of Latvia's GDP as well as around half of Latvia's exports. The city boasts a diversified economy with strengths in information and communication technologies, global business services, manufacturing and a dynamic startup ecosystem. The biggest exporters are in wood products, IT, food and beverage manufacturing, pharmaceuticals, transport and metallurgy. Tourism is also a large industry in Riga and after a slowdown during the global economic recessions of the late 2000s, grew 22% in 2011 alone.

The city benefits from strong transport links, including Riga International Airport, and an active seaport. The forthcoming Rail Baltica project is expected to further enhance Riga's connectivity and integration into the European transport network, with the potential to reinforce its position as a strategic centre for trade in Northern Europe.

The Freeport of Riga is one of the largest in the Baltics. It handled a record 41.8 million tons of cargo in 2014 and completed a new development on Krievu Sala in 2018, with the aim of moving the port away from the central parts of the city. However, its cargo turnover had been reduced by a half by 2024, in large part due to decreased trade with Russia after the outbreak of Russo-Ukrainian War and the sanctions imposed in response to it.

Riga was intended to become the global financial centre in the former Soviet Union. One bank, which provided high levels of secrecy for its customers, promoted itself as "We are closer than Switzerland!" (Russian: «Мы ближе, чем Швейцария!»). (Note: Richard L. Palmer, president of Cachet International, Inc., was the CIA station chief at the United States Embassy in Moscow from 1992 to 1994.) On 28 July 1995, twenty Latvian banks with assistance of persons from the Paris Stock Exchange organised the Riga Stock Exchange which was the first Latvian stock exchange in Riga.

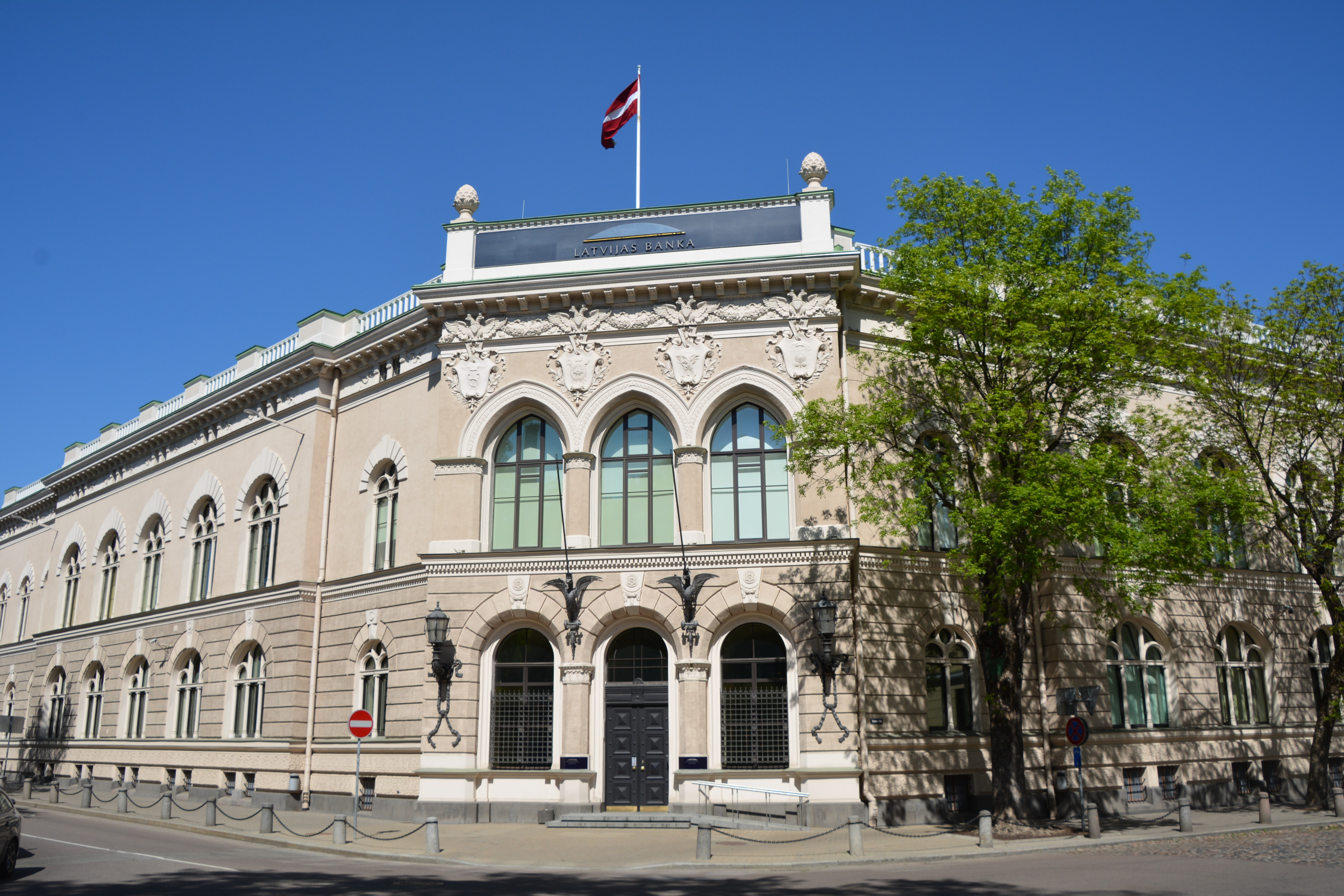
Bank of Latvia

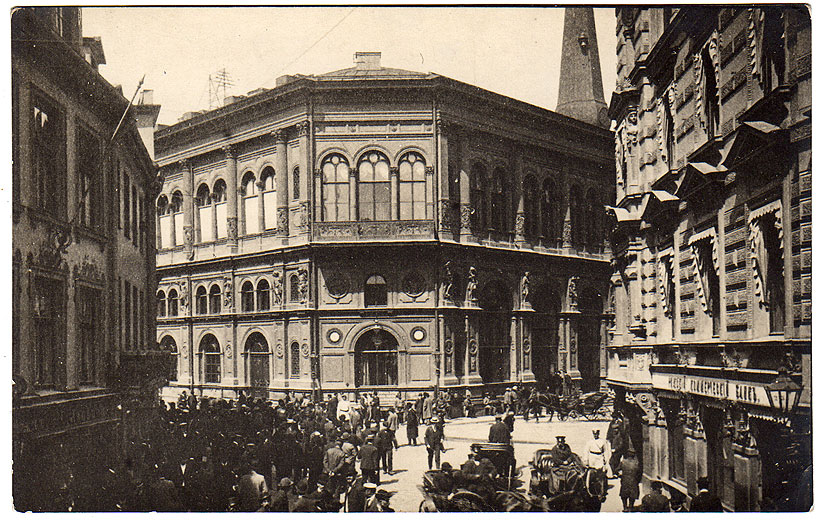
Riga Stock Exchange early 20th century. Now the Art Museum Riga Bourse.

=== Tourism ===
Riga is one of the leading travel destinations in the Baltic region in terms of overnight stays by foreign visitors. In 2024, the city welcomed over 1.1 million international tourists.

Summer remains the peak season for tourism in Riga, however, it's also seeing a growing influx of visitors in December, largely due to the city's transformation into a festive destination during the holiday season. The Riga Christmas Market, located in the Old Town of Riga, serves as a key attraction during the Christmas period.

The most popular attractions include the Riga Zoo, House of the Blackheads, Riga Central Market, the Latvian National Museum of Art and the Latvian National Museum of Natural History, as well as its historic Old Town and the Art Nouveau architecture found in high concentration the centre of the city.

In addition to leisure tourism, Riga serves as a significant venue for international trade fairs and exhibitions. The city hosts a variety of annual events across sectors such as technology, agriculture, and business.

== Culture ==
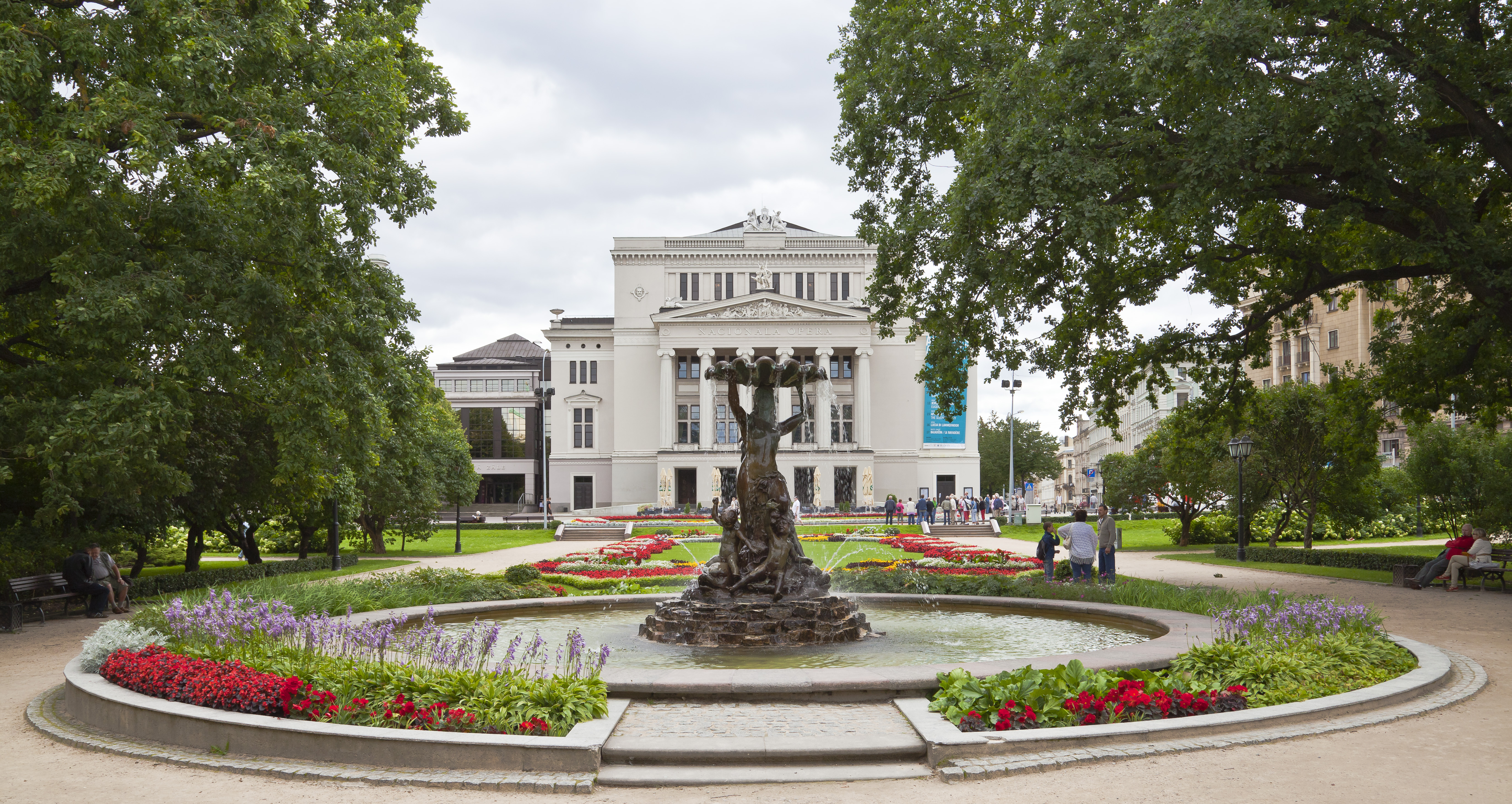
The Latvian National Opera

=== Theatres ===
- The Latvian National Opera was founded in 1918. The repertoire of the theatre embraces all opera masterpieces. Housed in a neoclassical building completed in 1863, it has become one of Riga's landmarks. The Latvian National Opera is famous not only for its operas, but for its ballet troupe as well.
- The Latvian National Theatre, founded in 1919, is renowned for preserving the traditions of Latvian drama. It is one of the biggest theatres in Latvia and is also notable as the site where Latvia declared its independence in 1918.
- The Mikhail Chekhov Riga Russian Theatre is the oldest professional drama theatre in Latvia, established in 1883. The repertoire of the theatre includes classical plays and experimental performances of Russian and other foreign playwrights.
- The Daile Theatre was opened for the first time in 1920. It is one of the most successful theatres in Latvia and is distinguished by its frequent productions of modern foreign plays. It's also known for the building it's housed in, which is considered as one of the most important examples of modernist architecture in Riga.
- The Latvian Puppet Theatre was founded in 1944 and presents shows for children and adults.
- The New Riga Theatre was opened in 1992 and has since become one of the most popular theatres in Latvia, also attracting audiences abroad.

=== Mežaparks Great Bandstand ===
The Mežaparks Great Bandstand

The Mežaparks Great Bandstand (Latvian: Mežaparka Lielā estrāde) is an open-air bandstand in Mežaparks park. The Bandstand is the place where the Latvian Song and Dance Festival, one of the largest amateur choral and dancing events in the world and part of UNESCO Masterpieces of the Oral and Intangible Heritage of Humanity list, takes places every five years.

=== World Choir Games ===
Riga hosted the biannual 2014 World Choir Games from 9 to 19 July 2014 which coincided with the city being named European Capital of Culture for 2014. The event, organised by the choral foundation, Interkultur, takes place at various host cities every two years and was originally known as the "Choir Olympics". The event regularly sees over 15,000 choristers in over 300 choirs from over 60 nations compete for gold, silver and bronze medals in over 20 categories. The competition is further divided into a Champions Competition and an Open Competition to allow choirs from all backgrounds to enter. Choral workshops and festivals are also witnessed in the host cities and are usually open to the public.

=== Food ===
Riga offers a diverse selection of restaurants, from traditional Latvian cuisine to various international influences. It also include s two Michelin-starred restaurants. Additionally, the city organizes Riga Restaurant Weeks in both spring and autumn, during which participating restaurants offer specially curated menus.

=== Music and nightlife ===
Positivus Festival, the largest music festival in the Baltics, takes place in Lucavsala, after relocating from the coastal town of Salacgrīva in 2022. Since then, it has featured performances by local and international artists like A$AP Rocky, Megan Thee Stallion, Sam Smith and Jamie XX.

The nightlife in Riga is scattered around various locations – the biggest concentration of bars and nightclubs, mostly oriented on tourists, can be found in the Old Town, but many popular establishments can be found in various parts of Central Riga and beyond, in areas such as Avoti, Teika, Āgenskalns and others, as well as in creative quarters, for example Tallinas Kvartāls or Briāna Kvartāls.

== Architecture ==
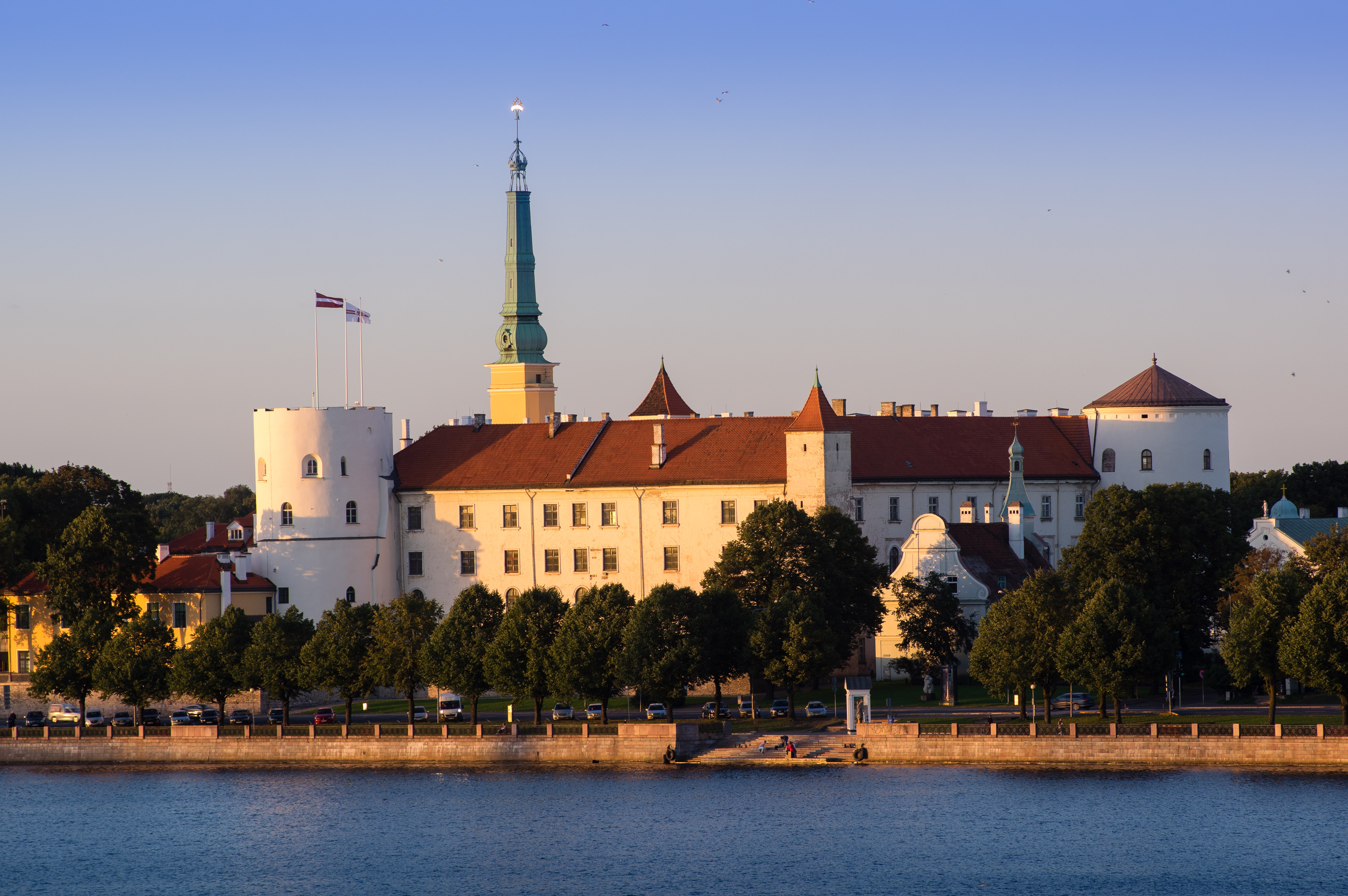
Riga Castle

The radio and TV tower of Riga is the tallest structure in Latvia and the Baltic States, and one of the tallest in the European Union, reaching 368.5 m (1,209 ft). Riga centre also has many great examples of Gothic revival architecture, such as the Kalpaka Boulevard Library, and a bevy of Art Nouveau architecture, as well as a medieval old town.

=== Art Nouveau ===
Riga has one of the largest collections of Art Nouveau buildings in the world, with at least 800 buildings. This is due to the fact that at the end of the 19th and beginning of the 20th centuries, when Art Nouveau was at the height of its popularity, Riga experienced an unprecedented financial and demographic boom. In the period from 1857 its population grew from 282,000 (256,200 in Riga itself and another 26,200 inhabitants beyond the city limits in the patrimonial district and military townlet of Ust-Dvinsk) to 472,100 in 1913. The middle class of Riga used their acquired wealth to build imposing apartment blocks outside the former city walls. Local architects, mostly graduates of Riga Technical University, adopted current European movements and in particular Art Nouveau. Between 1910 and 1913, between 300 and 500 new buildings were built each year in Riga, many of them in Art Nouveau style and most of them outside the old town.

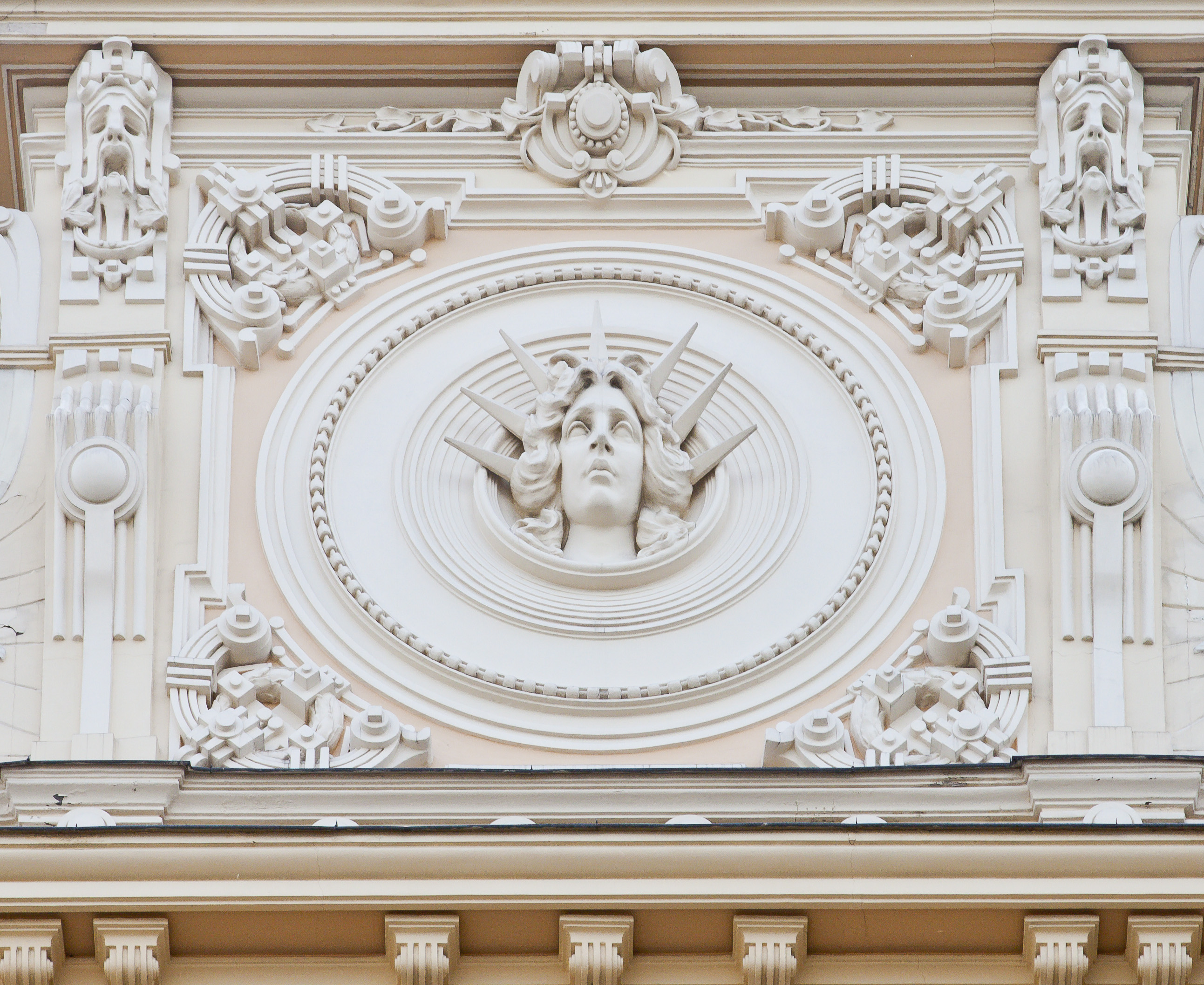
Alberta iela 13

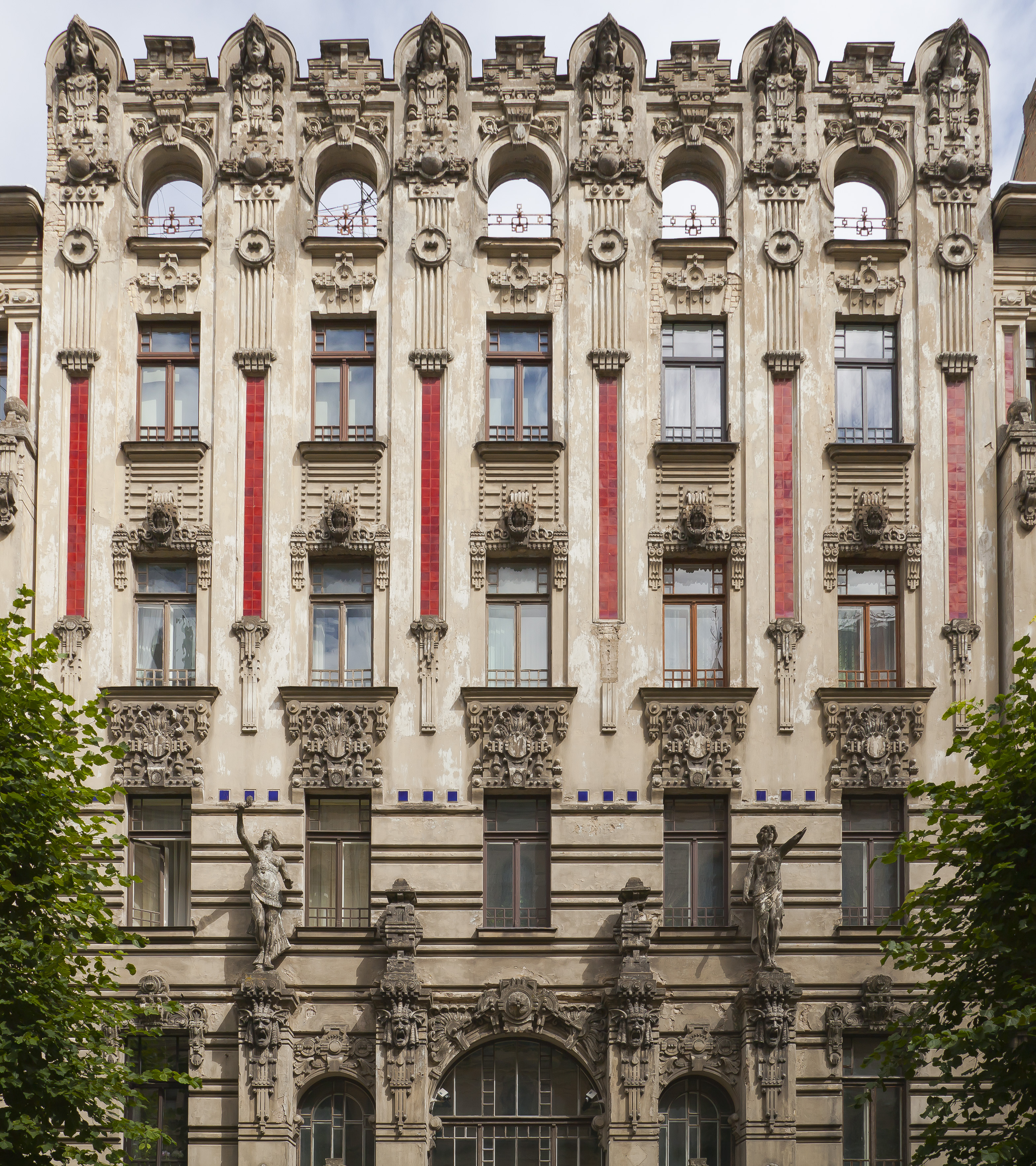
Alberta iela 2a

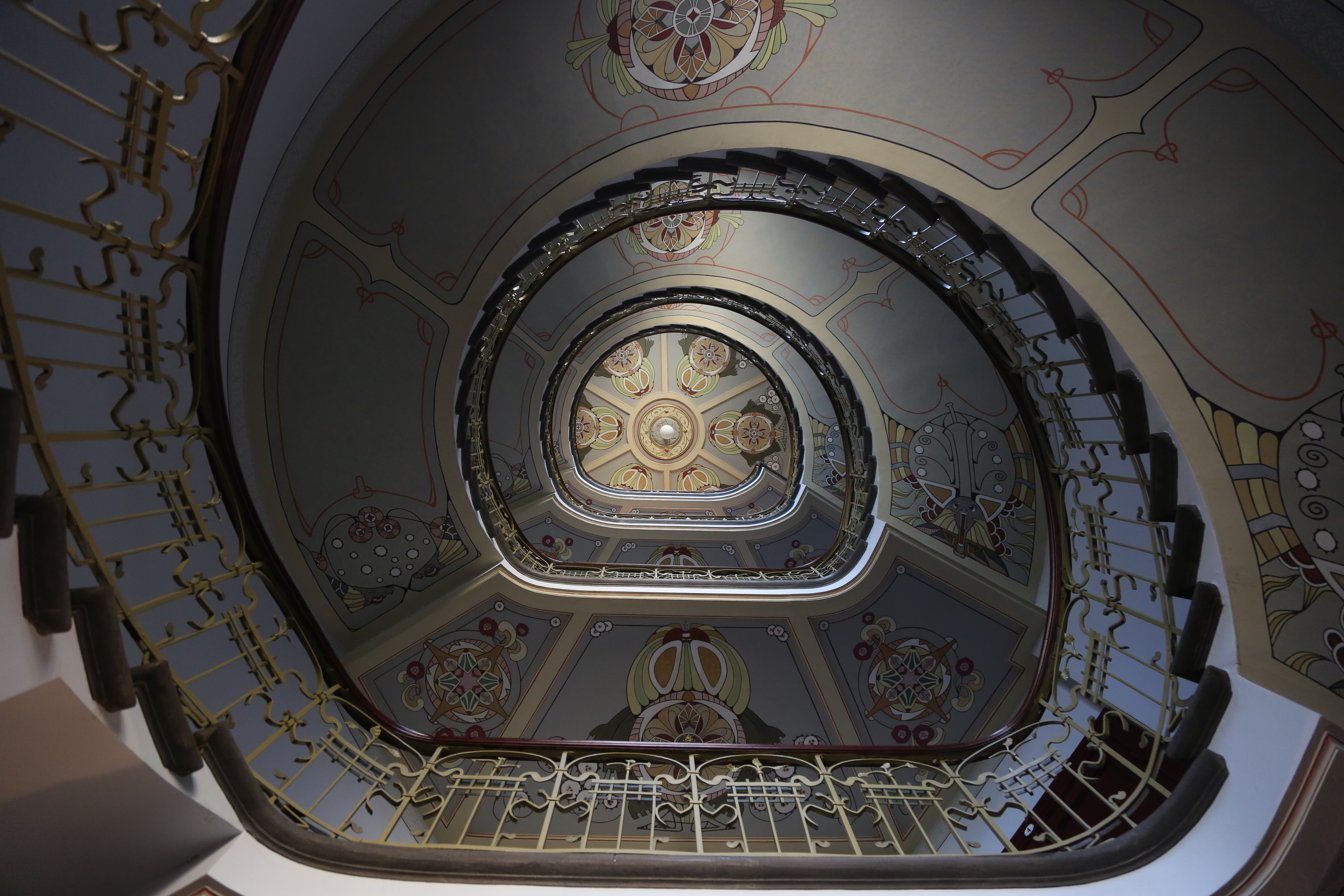
Staircase of Alberta iela 12

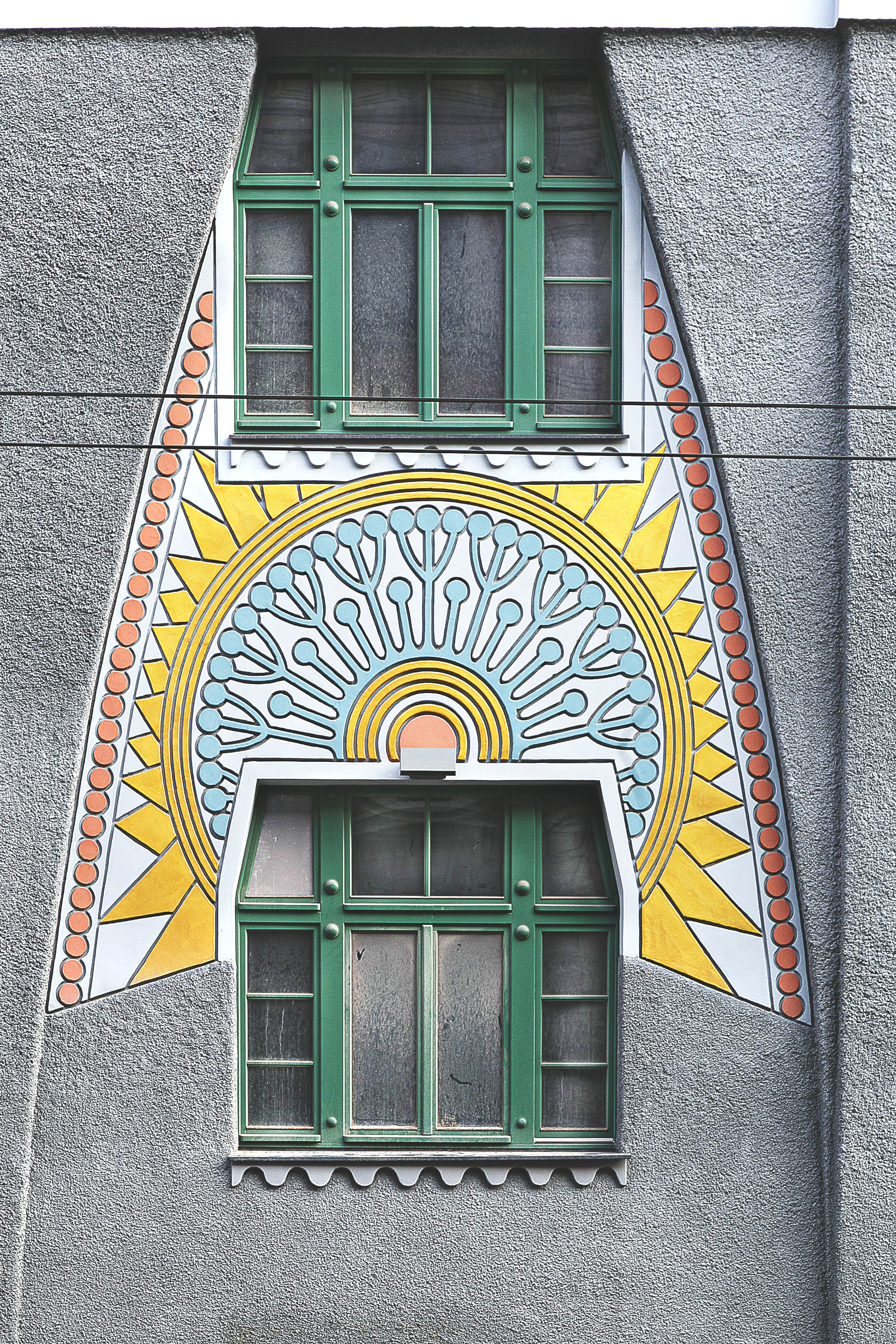
Aleksandra Čaka iela 26

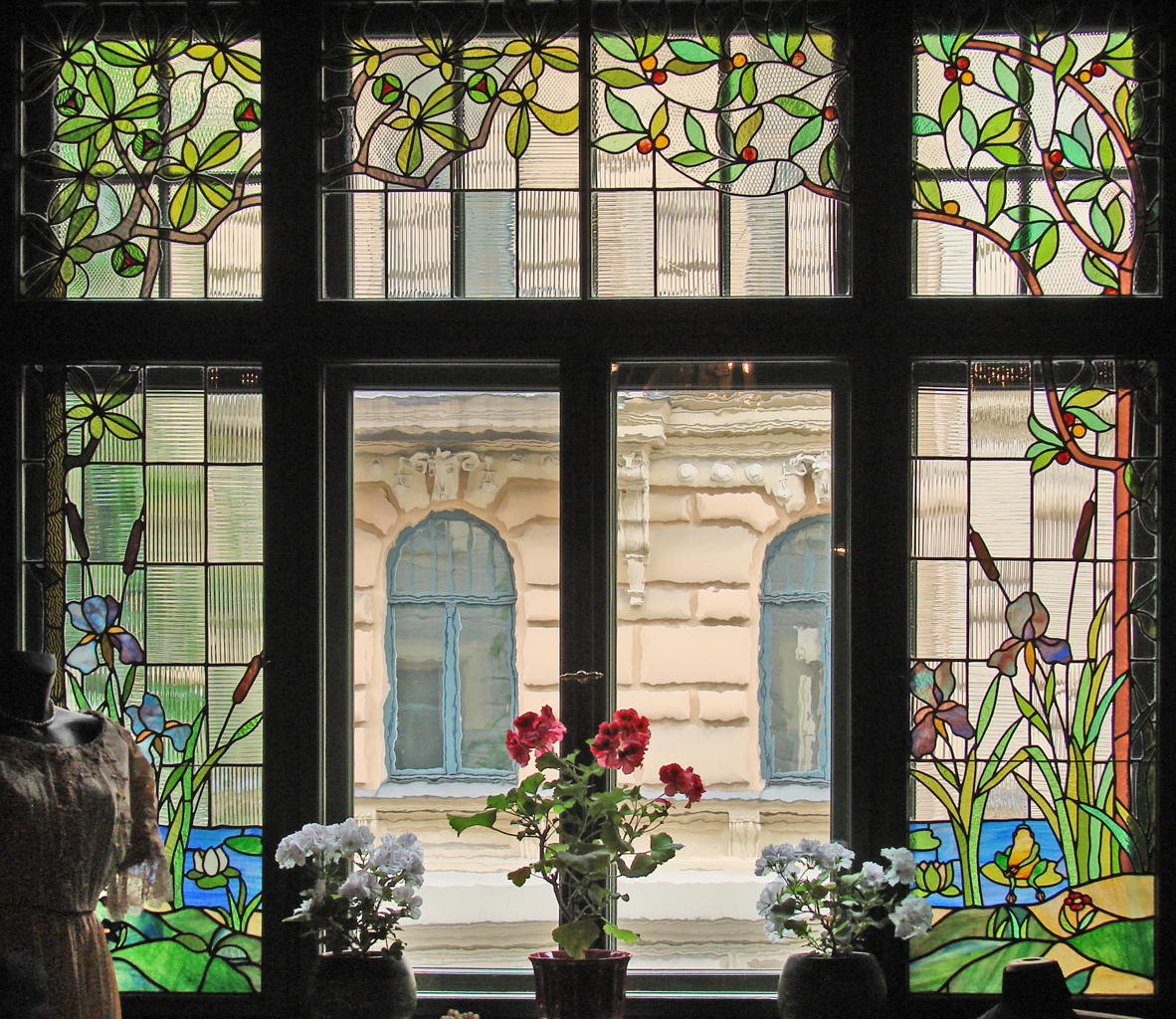
Riga Art Nouveau Museum

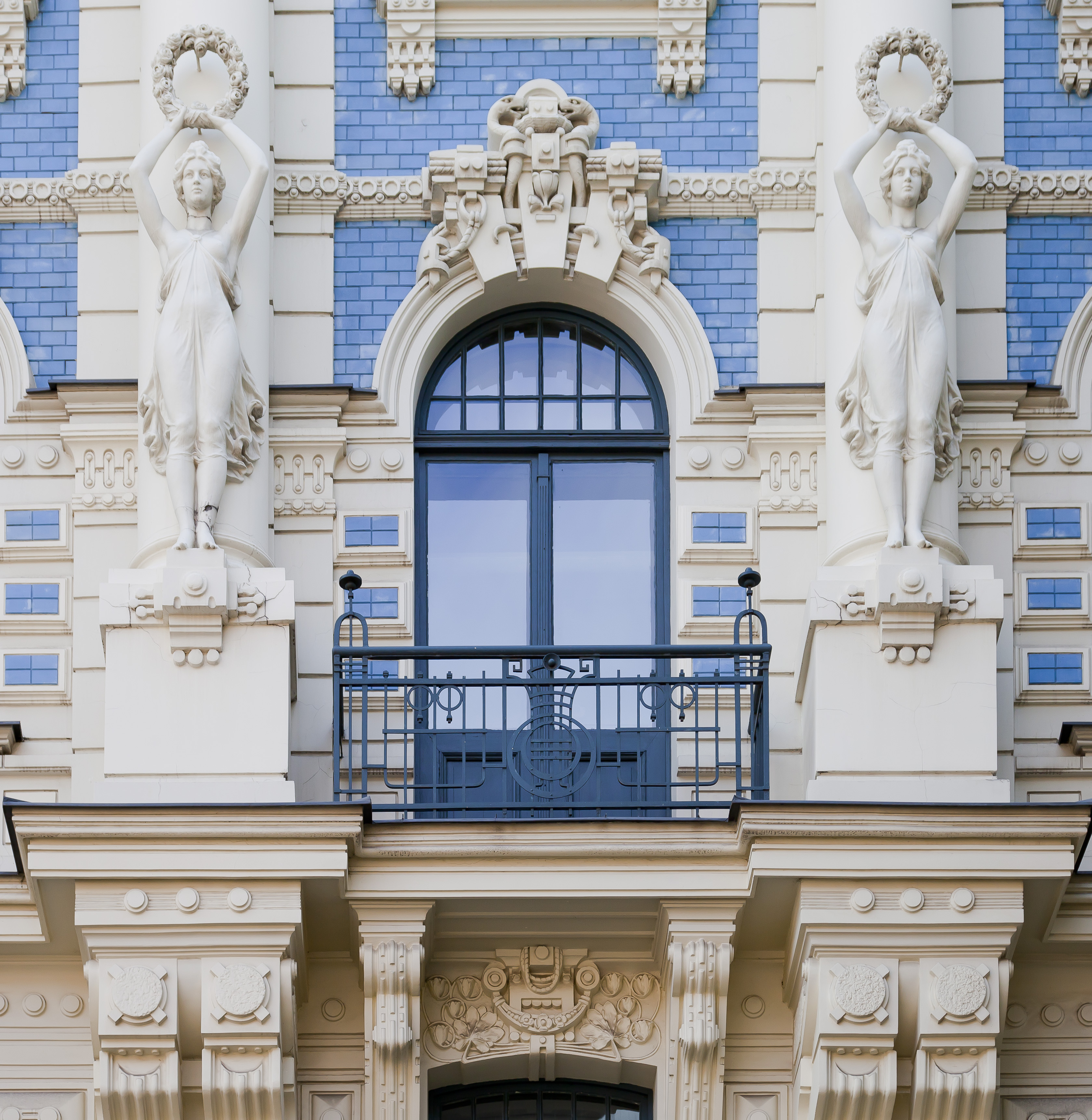
Strēlnieku iela 4a

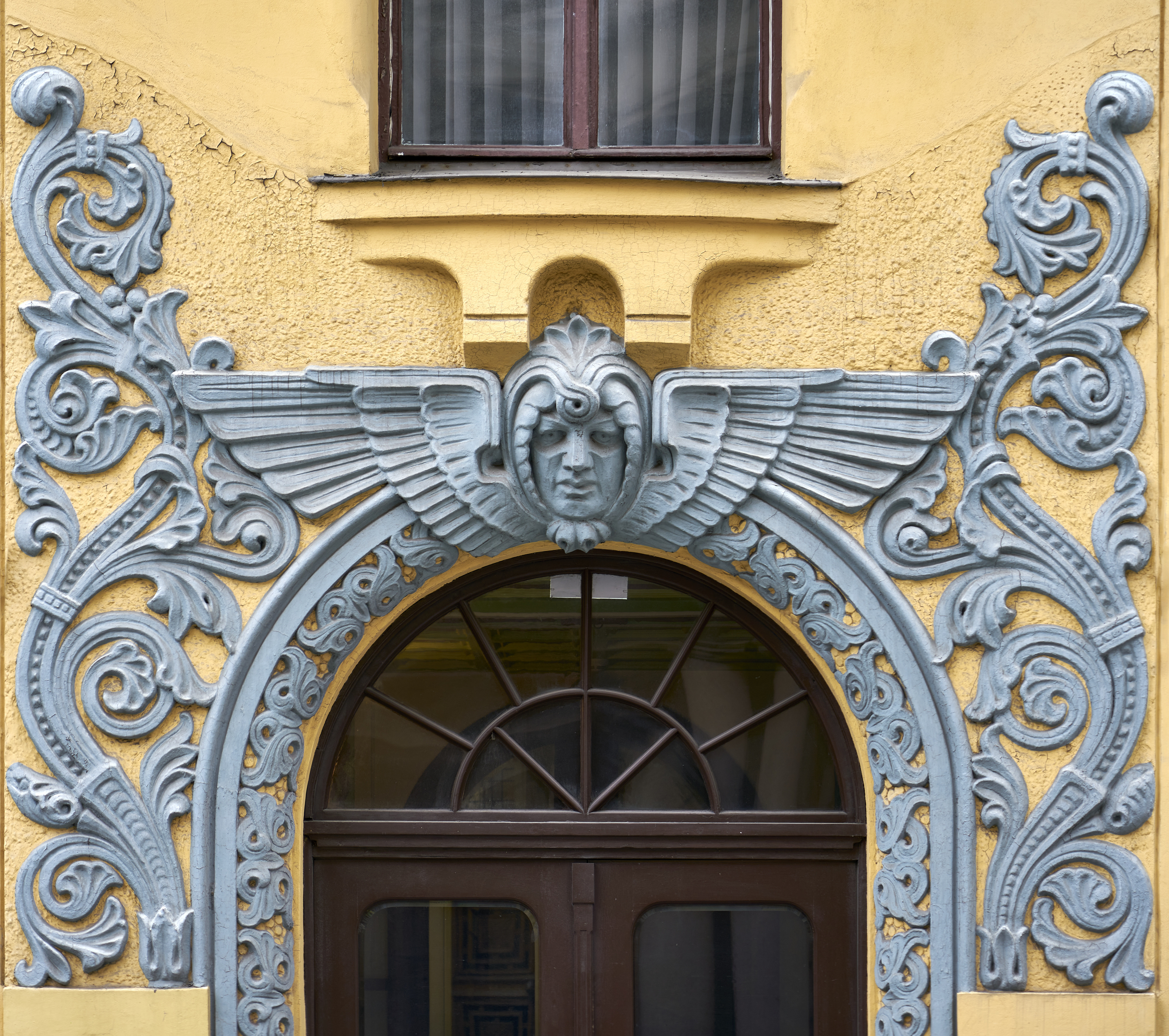
Meistaru iela 10 relief

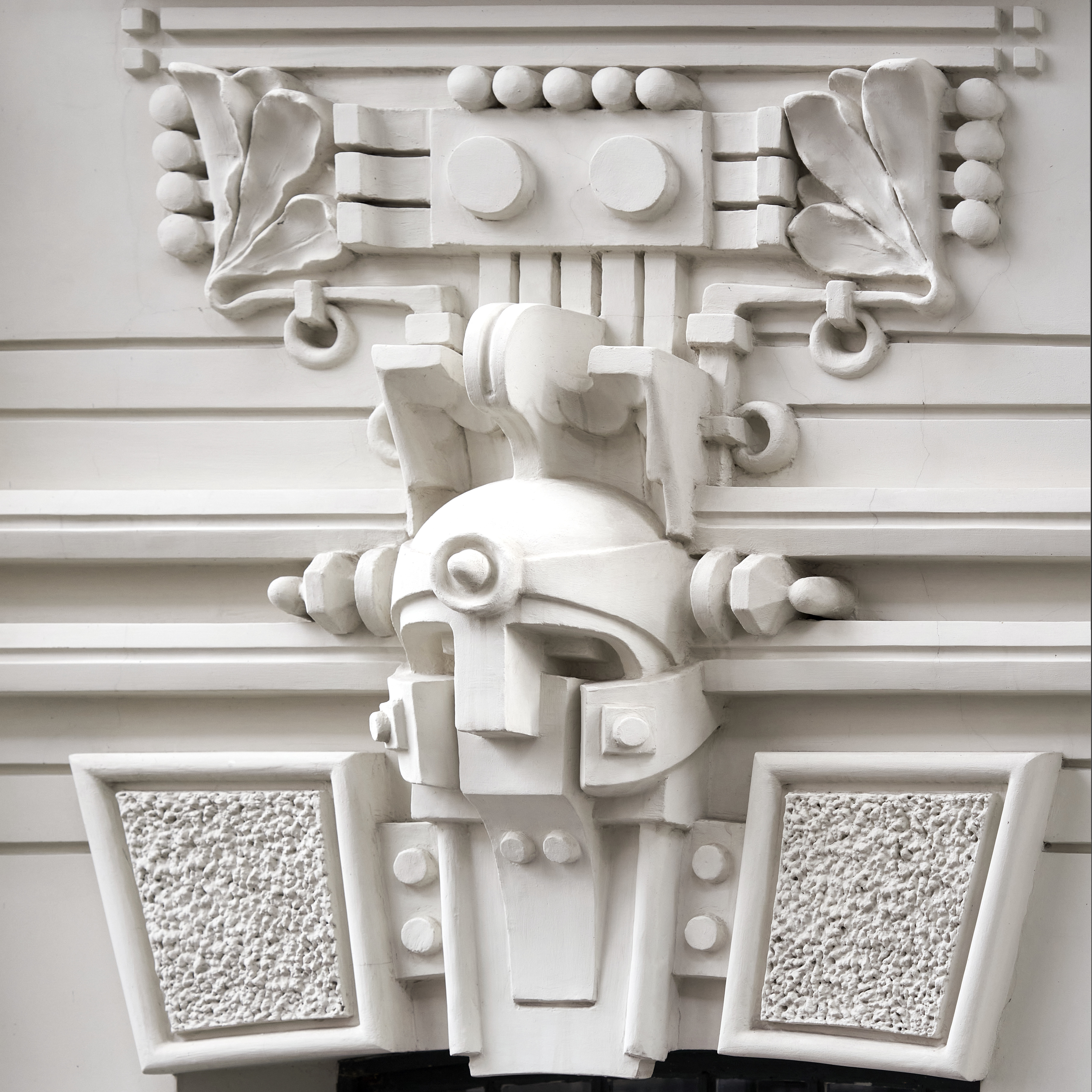
Strelnieku iela relief

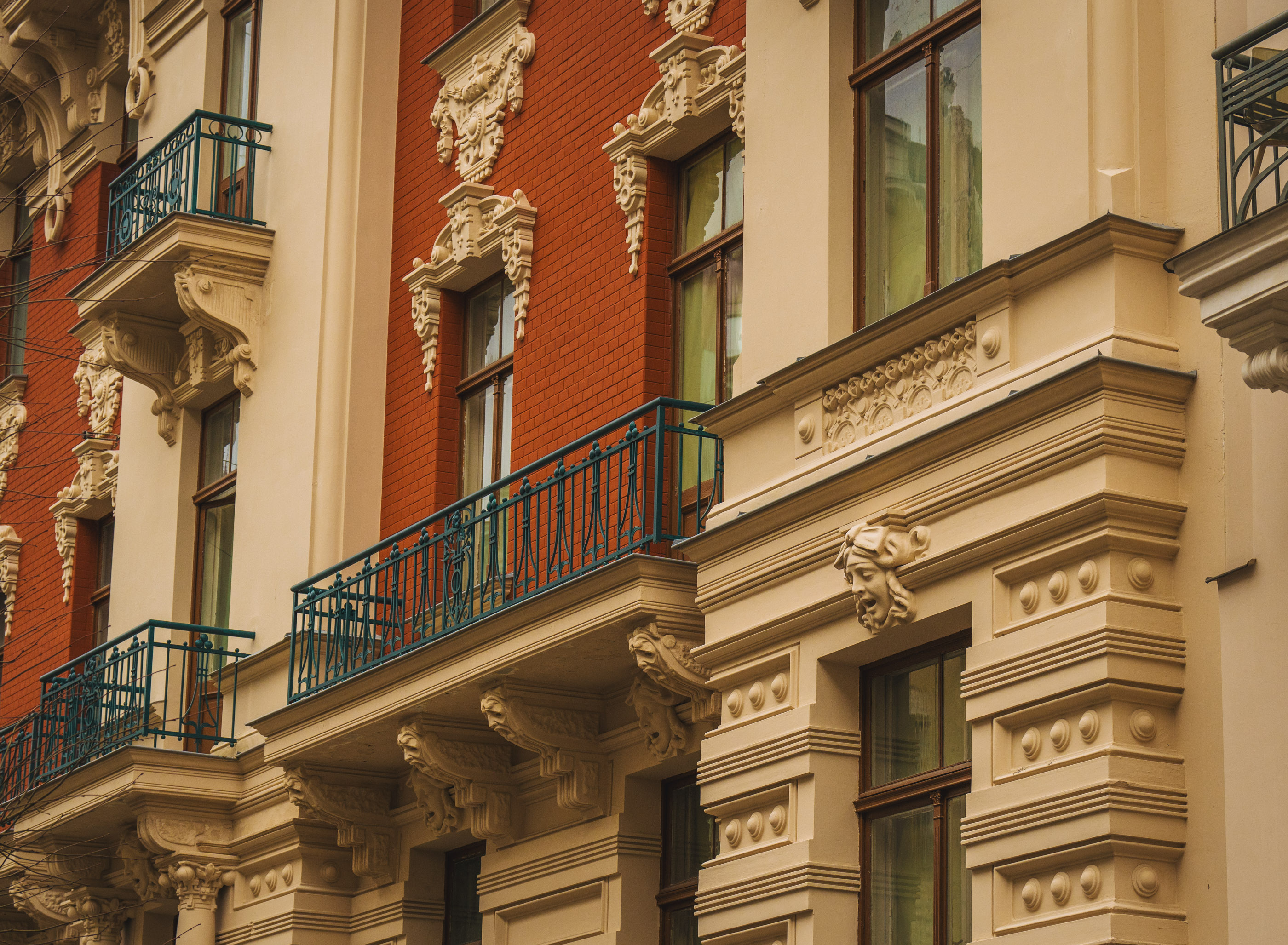
Alberta iela 6

== Sports ==
Riga has a rich basketball history. In 1937, as the defending champions, in hosted the second edition of the EuroBasket tournament. In the 1950s, Rīgas ASK became the best club in the Soviet Union and also in Europe, winning the first three editions of the European Cup for Men's Champions Clubs from 1958 to 1960.

In 1960, ASK was not the only team from Riga to take the European crown. TTT Riga clinched their first title in the European Cup for Women's Champion Clubs, turning Riga into the capital city of European basketball because for the first and, to date, only time in the history of European basketball, clubs from the same city were concurrent European men's and women's club champions.

Riga hosted one of the groups for EuroBasket 2015, and will host again for the third time in 2025, this time also hosting the knockout phase and the final. It also hosted the women's Eurobasket tournament in 2009.

The city also hosted the Men's Ice Hockey World Championships in 2006, 2021 and 2023.

=== Sports clubs ===
Xiaomi Arena, home to multiple sports clubs of Riga

- Basketball
  - BK VEF Rīga – a professional basketball team that is a twelve-time Latvian champion. VEF also participates in high-level international competition such as Eurocup and Basketball Champions League.
  - BK Barons – a men's basketball team, two-time Latvian champion, as well as the 2008 FIBA EuroCup winner. Ceased to exist in 2017.
  - TTT Riga – a women's basketball team, which between 1960 and 1982 won eighteen FIBA EuroLeague Women titles
  - Rīgas Zeļļi – a men's basketball club established in 2023. They managed to reach the final of the Latvian Basketball League in their first season, and the final of the Latvian–Estonian League in their second season.
- Ice hockey
  - Dinamo Riga – a professional ice hockey club established in 2008. It played in the Kontinental Hockey League until 2022. Dinamo was established as a successor to the former hockey team with the same name, which was founded in 1946 but ceased to exist in 1995. However, the revived team also went defunct in 2023.
  - HK Riga – the junior team of Dinamo Riga, which used to play in the MHL until withdrawing after the Russian invasion of Ukraine.
- Football
  - Riga FC – Riga Football Club, commonly referred to as Riga FC, were established in 2015 after a merger of two Riga based teams – FC Caramba Riga and Dinamo Rīga. After winnthing the top-division Virslīga for the first time in 2018, they also won championships in 2019 and 2020.
  - RFS – even though the club's name is derived from the city-owned Riga Football School (RFS), the professional club currently has no relation to it. After debuting in Virslīga in 2016, they have won 3 Latvian championships and also qualified for UEFA Conference League group stage in 2022 and UEFA Europa League league phase in 2024.
  - FS Metta-LU – founded in 2006. Metta play their home games at Daugava Stadium.
  - JDFS Alberts – Jura Docenko Futbola Skola Alberts, commonly referred to as JDFS Alberts was founded as a football school in 2008 and subsequently became a professional Latvian football league team.
  - Riga United FC

Dissolved Football Clubs

- Skonto FC – Skonto FC was a football club established in 1991. The club won fourteen successive Latvian Higher League titles. For a long time it provided the core of the Latvian national football team. Following financial problems, the club was demoted to the Latvian First League in 2016 and went bankrupt in December of that year and subsequently dissolved.
- JFK Olimps – JFK Olimps played in the top division of Latvian football. The club was founded in 2005 and dissolved in 2012. According to a study from January 2011, the club was the youngest team in Europe, with an average age of 19.02 years.

=== Sports facilities ===
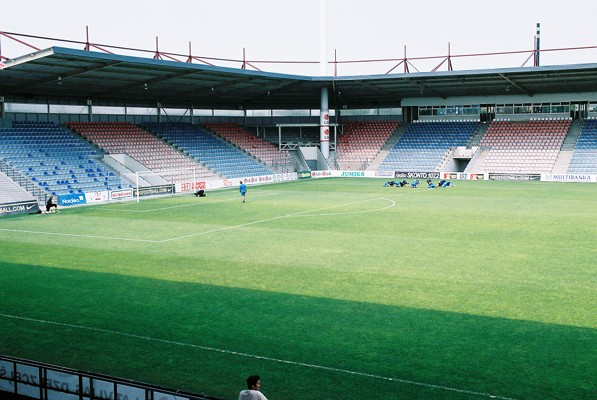
Skonto Stadium

- Xiaomi Arena – a multi-purpose arena built in 2006 as the main venue for the 2006 Men's World Ice Hockey Championships. It can hold up to 14,500 people and has hosted ice hockey, basketball and volleyball events, as well as Red Bull X-Fighters
- Skonto Stadium – a football stadium, built in 2000. It is the main stadium used for games of the Latvian national football team and the home stadium of Riga FC. The stadium was previously the home stadium of Skonto FC prior to the team's dissolution.
- Daugava Stadium – a stadium built in 1958, used for both football and athletics
- Biķernieki Complex Sports Base – Latvia's leading motorsport complex. It used to host a round in the FIA World Rallycross Championship from 2016 to 2022 and also served as a stage for the World Rally Championship event in 2024, the Tet Rally Latvia.

=== Sports events ===
The Riga Marathon, held annually in May, is one of the biggest sporting events in the country. In 2025 it recorded 40,122 participants from 109 countries around the world. The city has also hosted many notable one-off sports events, listed below.

- EuroBasket 1937
- 1999 European Athletics Junior Championships
- EuroBasket Women 2009
- 2006 Men's World Ice Hockey Championships
- Riga Marathon
- 2013 World Women's Curling Championship
- EuroBasket 2015
- 2016 Men's World Floorball Championships
- 2021 IIHF World Championship
- FIDE Grand Swiss Tournament 2021
- 2023 World Athletics Road Running Championships
- 2023 IIHF World Championship
- EuroBasket 2025

== Transport ==
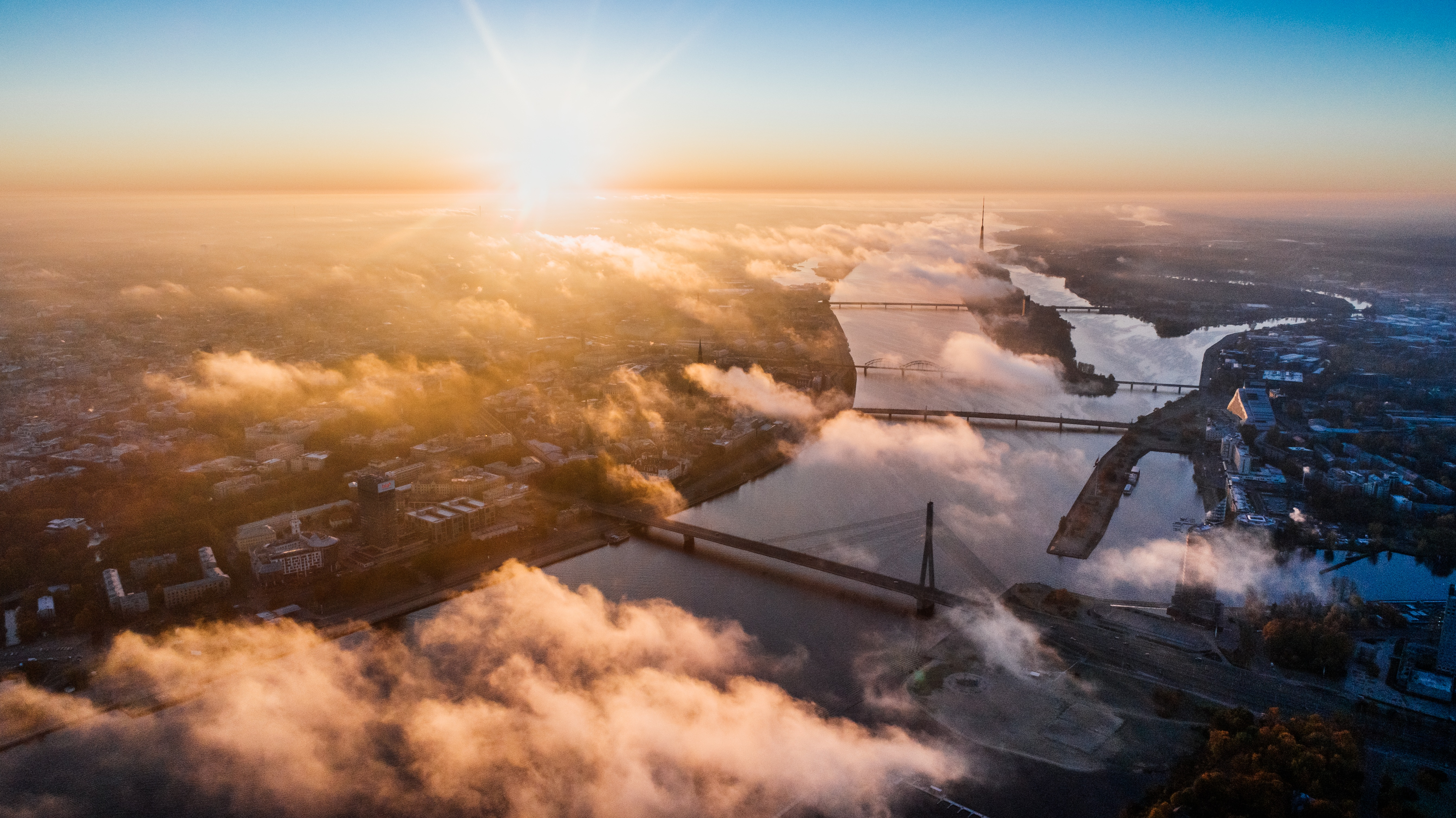
Bridges over the Daugava river.

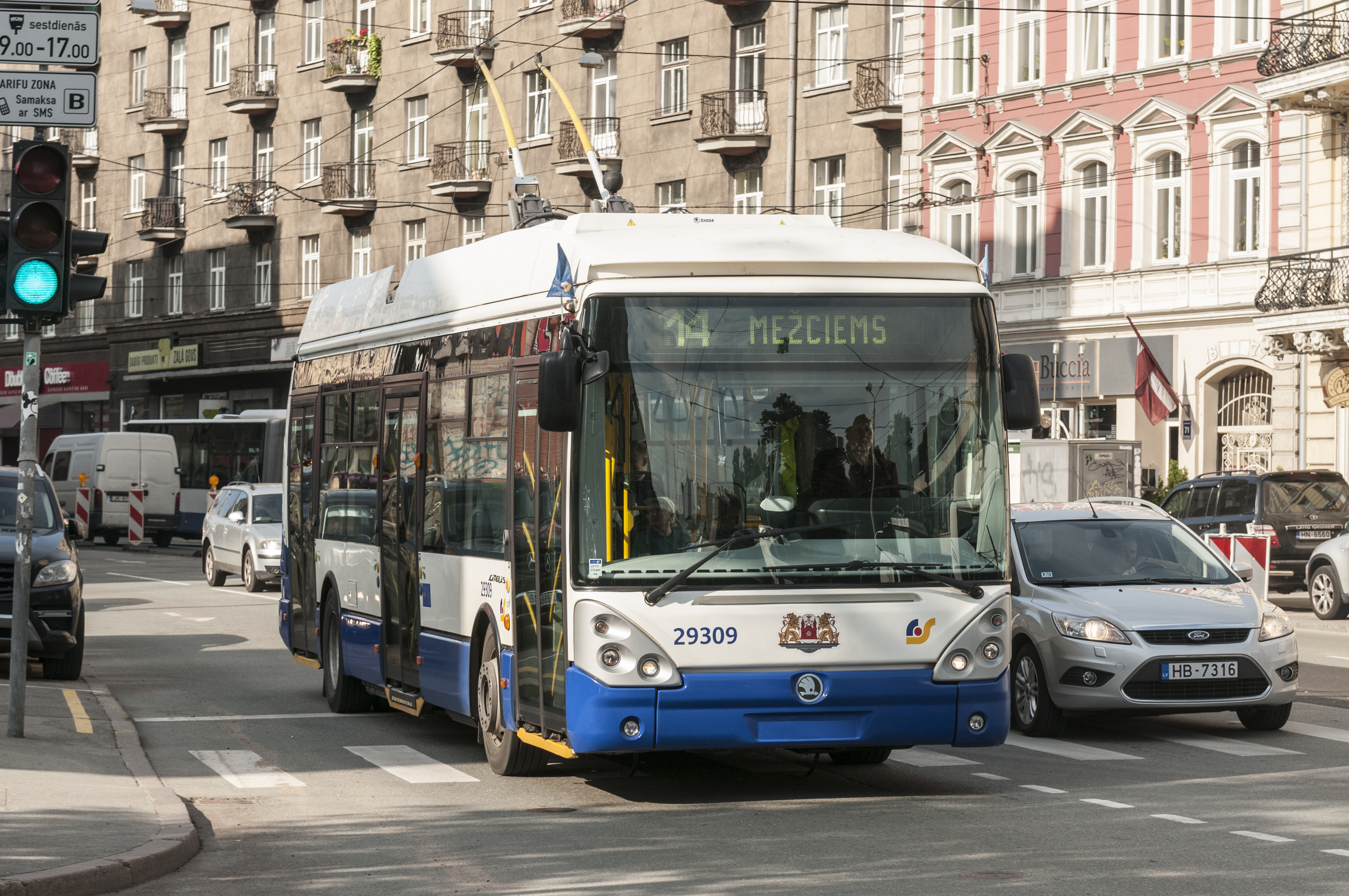
One of the several trolleybus types in Riga

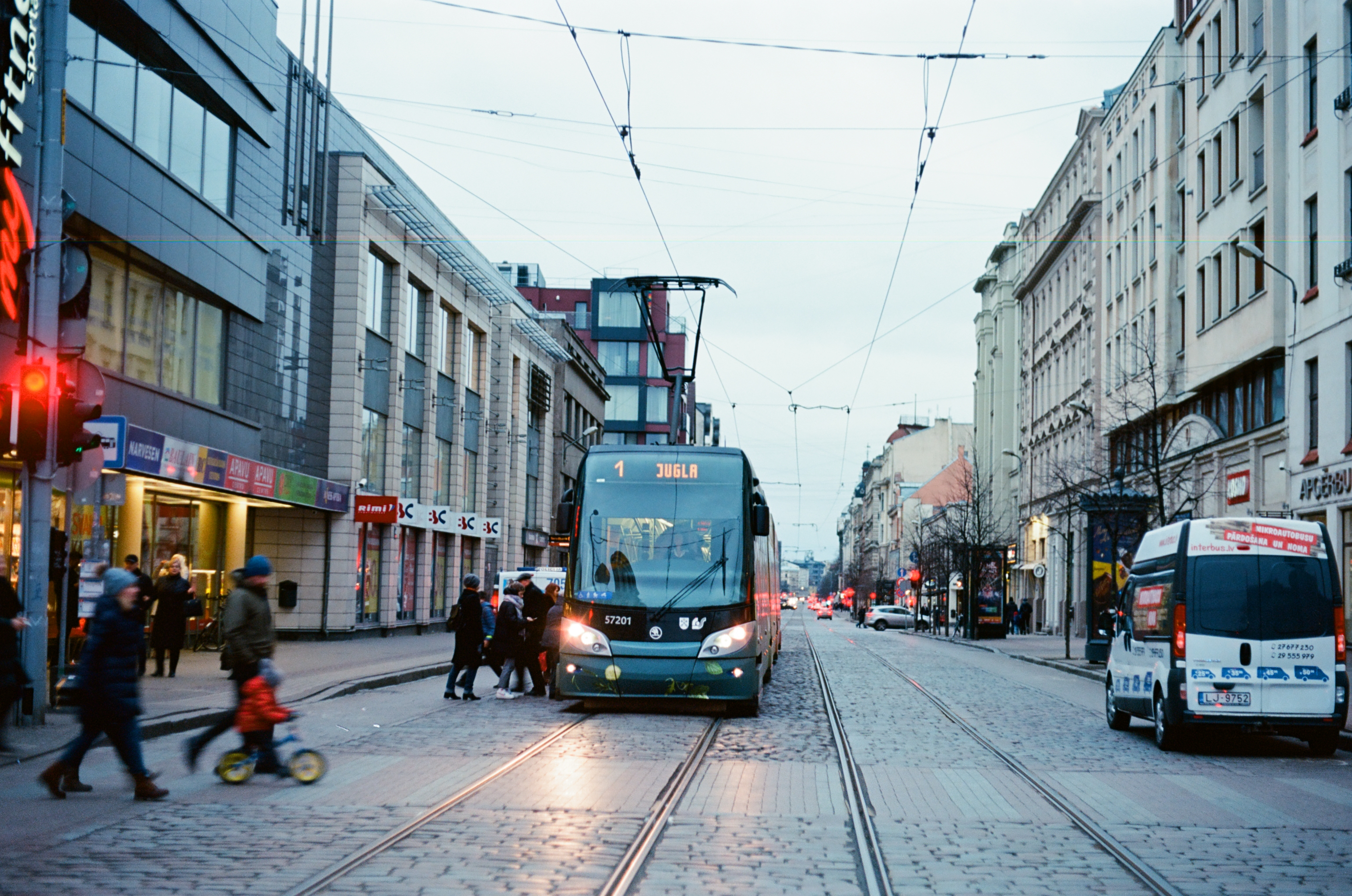
A Škoda 15 T tram in Riga

Riga is a large hub in the Passenger Train network: commuter train frequency in 2016.

Riga, with its central geographic position and concentration of population, has always been the infrastructural hub of Latvia. Several national roads begin in Riga, and European route E22 crosses Riga from the east and west, while the Via Baltica crosses Riga from the south and north.

As a city situated by a river, Riga also has several bridges. The oldest-standing bridge is the Railway Bridge, which is also the only railroad-carrying bridge in Riga. The Stone Bridge (Akmens tilts) connects Old Riga and Pārdaugava; the Island Bridge (Salu tilts) connects Maskavas Forštate and Pārdaugava via Zaķusala; and the Shroud Bridge (Vanšu tilts) connects Old Riga and Pārdaugava via Ķīpsala. In 2008, the first stage of the new Southern Bridge (Dienvidu tilts) route across the Daugava was completed, and was opened to traffic on 17 November.

The Southern Bridge was the biggest construction project in the Baltic states in 20 years, and its purpose was to reduce traffic congestion in the city centre. Another major construction project is the planned Riga Northern transport corridor; its first segment detailed project was completed in 2015.

The Freeport of Riga facilitates cargo and passenger traffic by sea. Sea ferries connect Riga Passenger Terminal to Stockholm operated by Tallink. Riga has one active airport that serves commercial airlines—the Riga International Airport (RIX), built in 1973. It is the primary hub of AirBaltic and a base for RyanAir. Renovation and modernisation of the airport was completed in 2001, coinciding with the 800th anniversary of the city. In 2006, a new terminal extension was opened. Extension of the runway was completed in October 2008, and the airport is now able to accommodate large aircraft such as the Airbus A340, Boeing 747, 757, 767 and 777. Another terminal extension is under construction as of 2014. The annual number of passengers has grown from 310,000 in 1993 to 4.7 million in 2014, making Riga International Airport the largest in the Baltic States. A new multi-modal hub is planned around the airport with a Rail Baltica station and airport city development planned.

The former international airport of Riga, Spilve Airport, located 5 km (3 mi) from Riga city centre, is used for small aircraft, pilot training and recreational aviation. Riga was also home to a military air base during the Cold War—Rumbula Air Base.

Public transport in the city is provided by Rīgas Satiksme which operates a large number of trams, buses and trolleybuses on an extensive network of routes across the city. In addition, up until 2012 many private owners operated minibus services, after which the City Council established the unified transport company Rīgas mikroautobusu satiksme, establishing a monopoly over the service.

Riga International Coach Terminal provides domestic and international connections by coach.

As the population of Riga city started to approach 1 million people in the 1980s, the city became eligible (under the Soviet standards of the time) for the construction of a subway system Riga Metro, which would have been paid for by the Soviet government. However, the widespread protests from the public put an end to this plan, and the population decline from the 1990s onwards has made it irrelevant.

Riga is connected to the rest of Latvia by domestic trains operated by the national carrier Passenger Train, whose headquarters are in Riga. The main railway station is the Riga Central Station. It has stops for public transport along the streets Satekles iela, 13. janvāra iela Marijas iela, and Merķeļa iela. There are also international rail services to Lithuania and Estonia. A TEN-T project called Rail Baltica envisages building a high-speed railway line via Riga connecting Tallinn to Warsaw using standard gauge, is expected to be put into operation in 2030. Latvian Railways (Latvian: Latvijas dzelzceļš or LDz) operates the Latvian Rail History Museum in Riga.

== Universities ==
- University of Latvia (LU)
- Art Academy of Latvia (LMA)
- Riga Technical University (RTU)
- Riga Stradiņš University (RSU)
- Riga Graduate School of Law (RGSL)
- Stockholm School of Economics in Riga (SSE Riga)
- BA School of Business and Finance (BA)
- Transport and Telecommunication Institute (TTI)
- Riga International School of Economics and Business Administration (RISEBA)
- Turība University
- Riga Aeronautical Institute (RAI)
- Latvian Academy of Culture (LKA)
- Latvian Academy of Sport Education (LSPA)
- Jāzeps Vītols Latvian Academy of Music

== Notable people ==
=== Public service ===
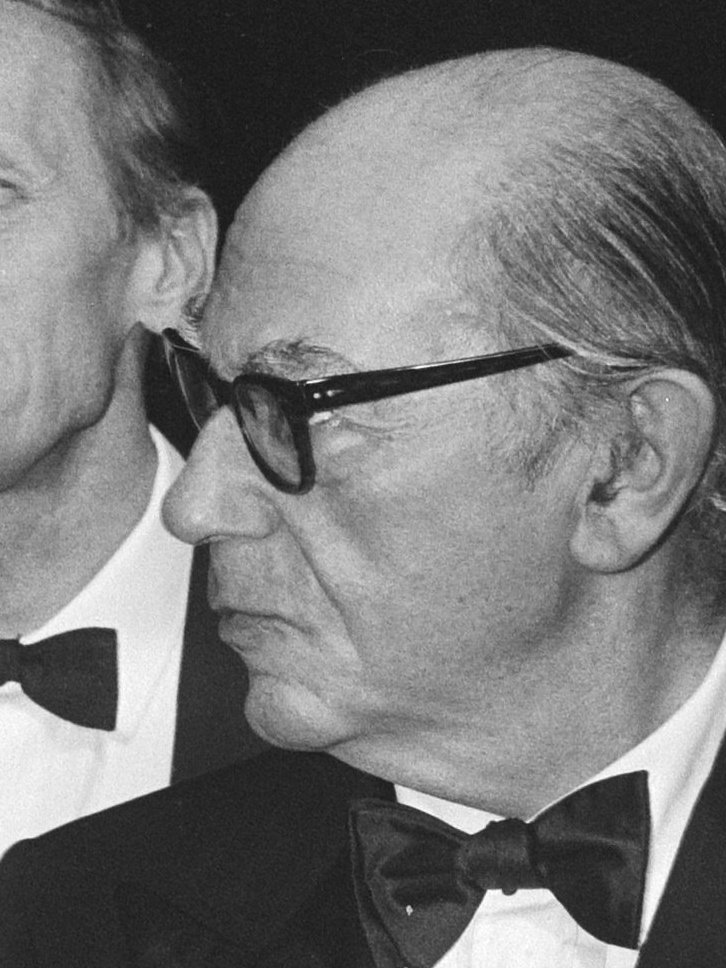
Isaiah Berlin, 1983

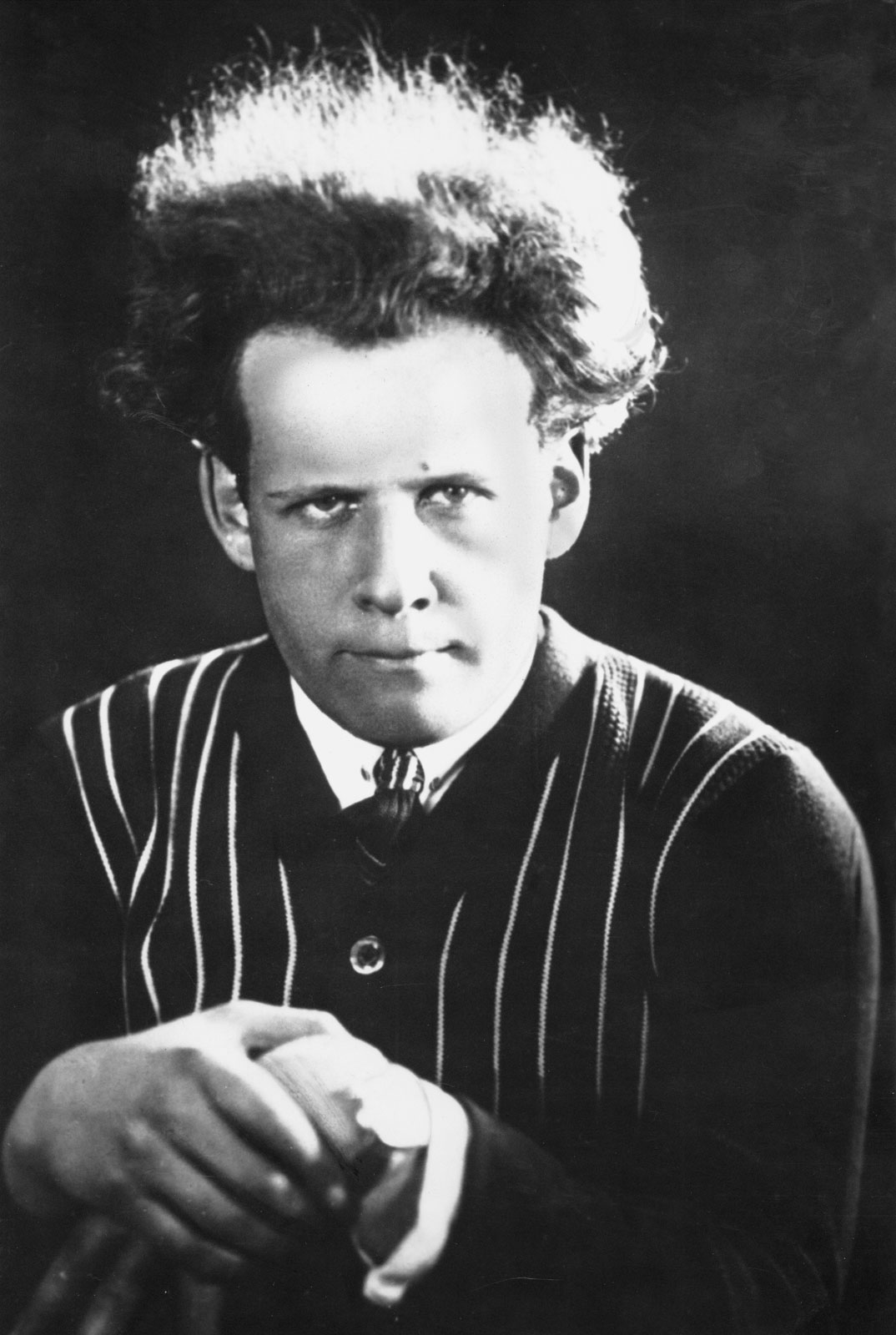
Sergei Eisenstein, early 1920s

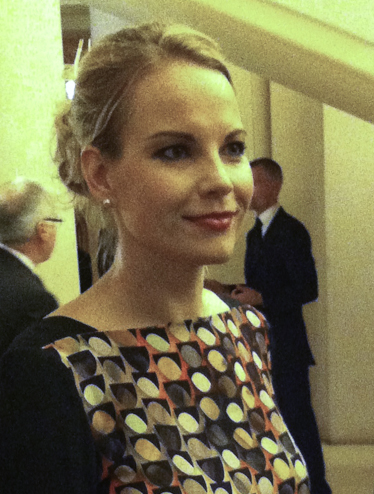
Elīna Garanča, 2012

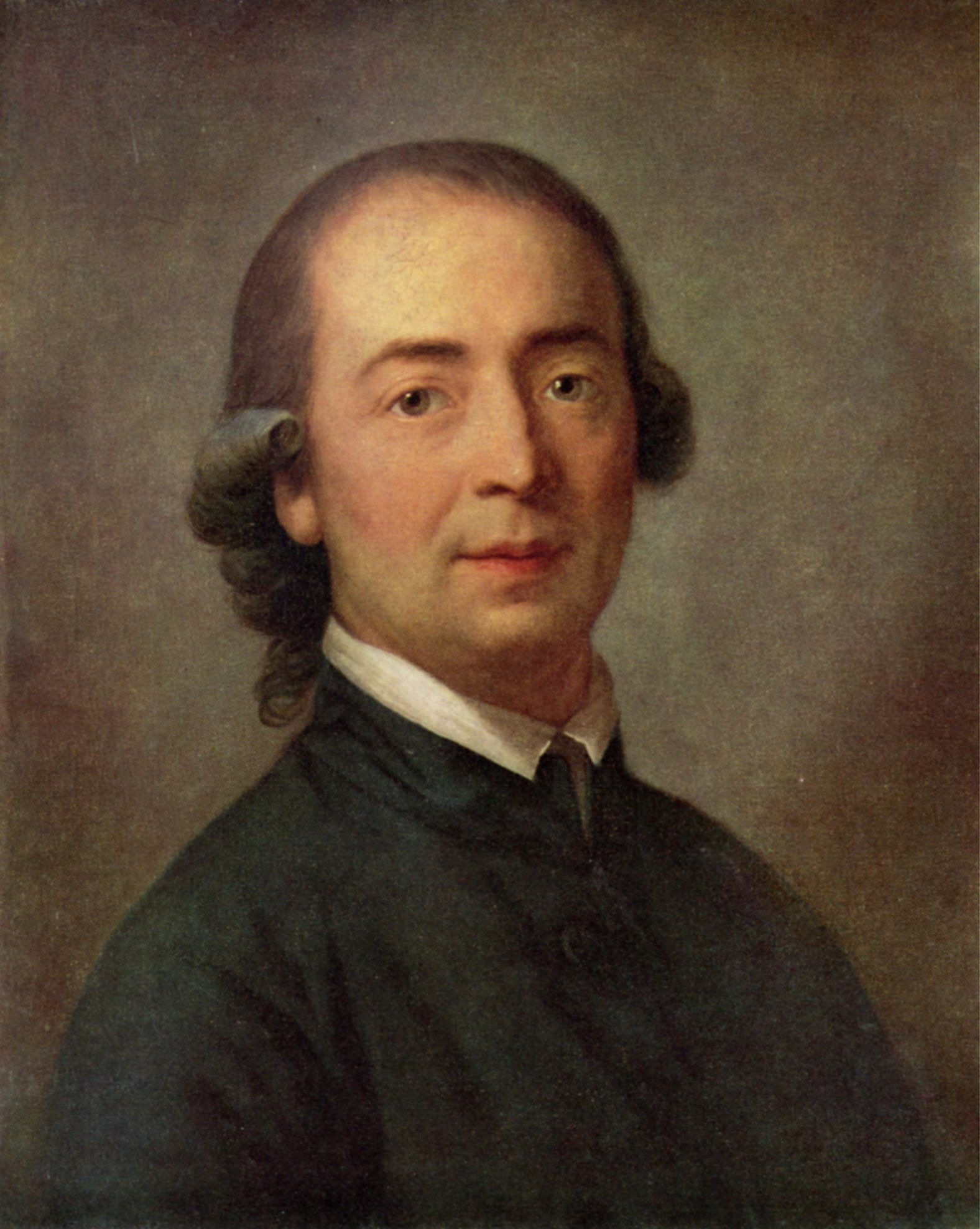
Johann Gottfried Herder, painted in 1785

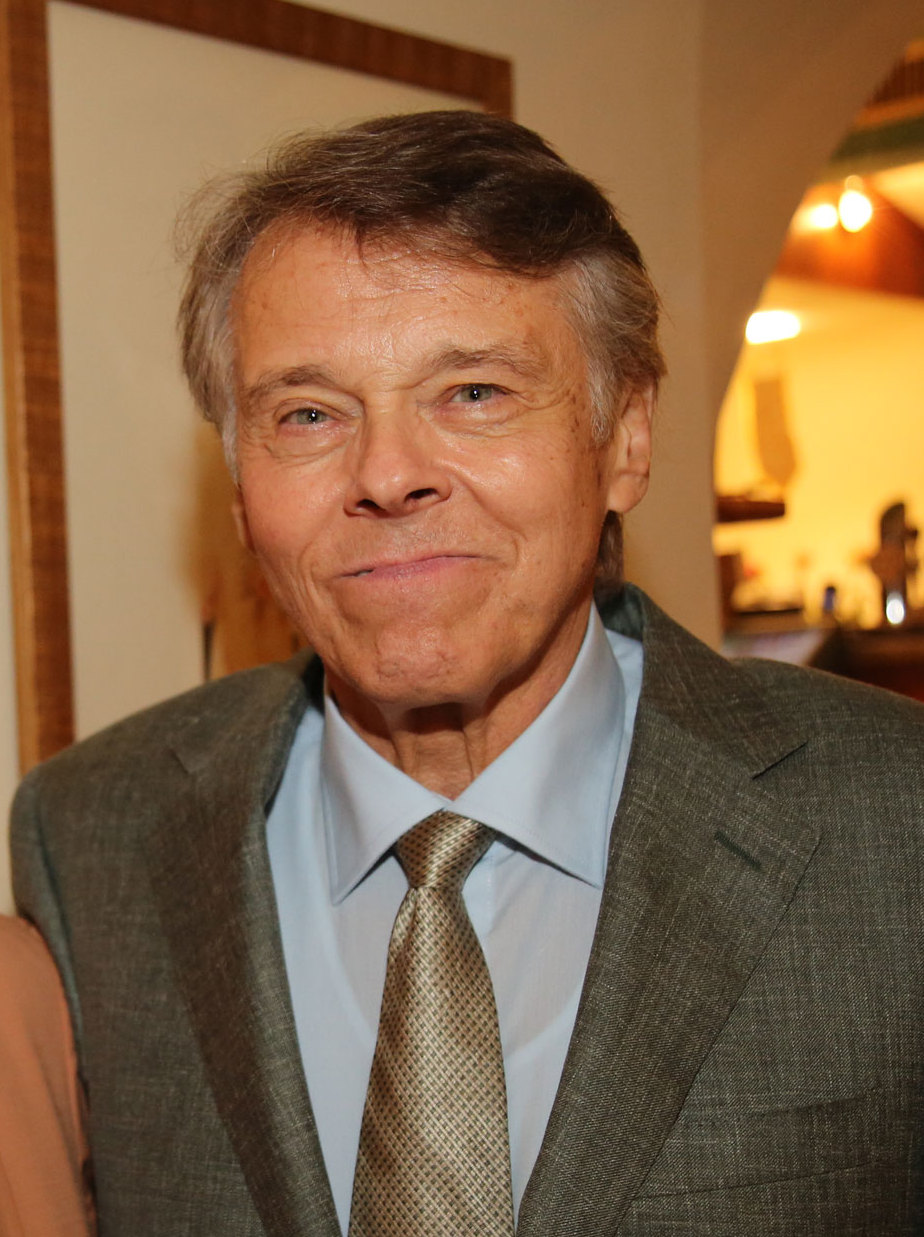
Mariss Jansons, 2015

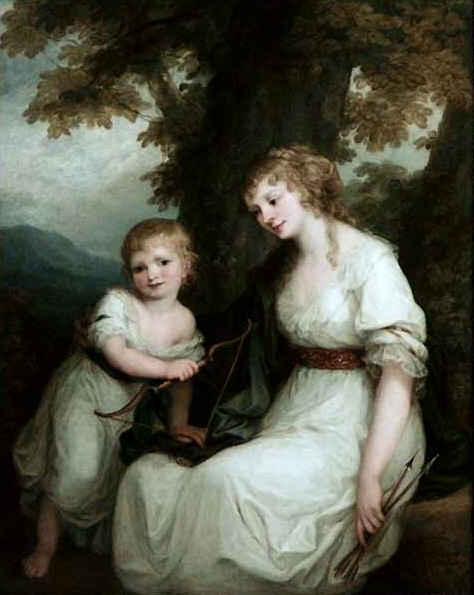
Baroness von Krüdener and her son Paul, painted in 1786

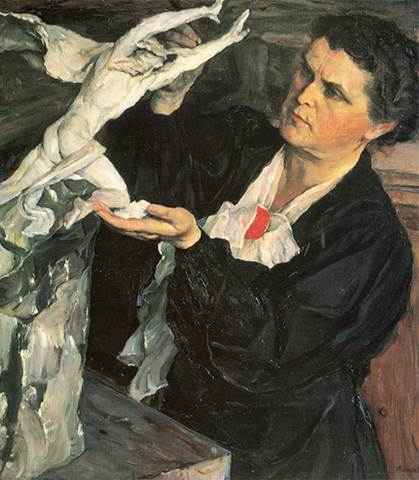
Vera Mukhina, 1937

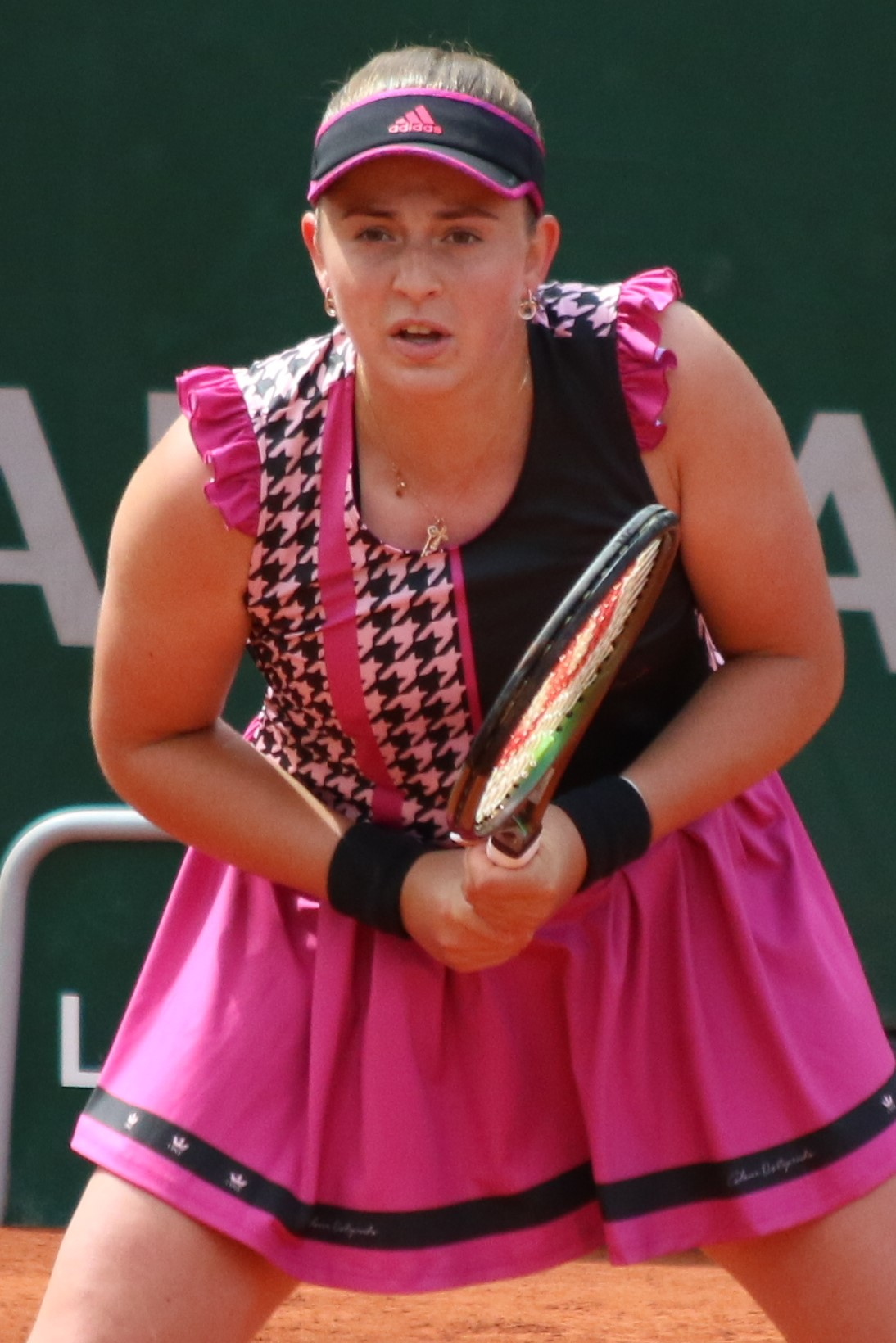
Jeļena Ostapenko, 2022

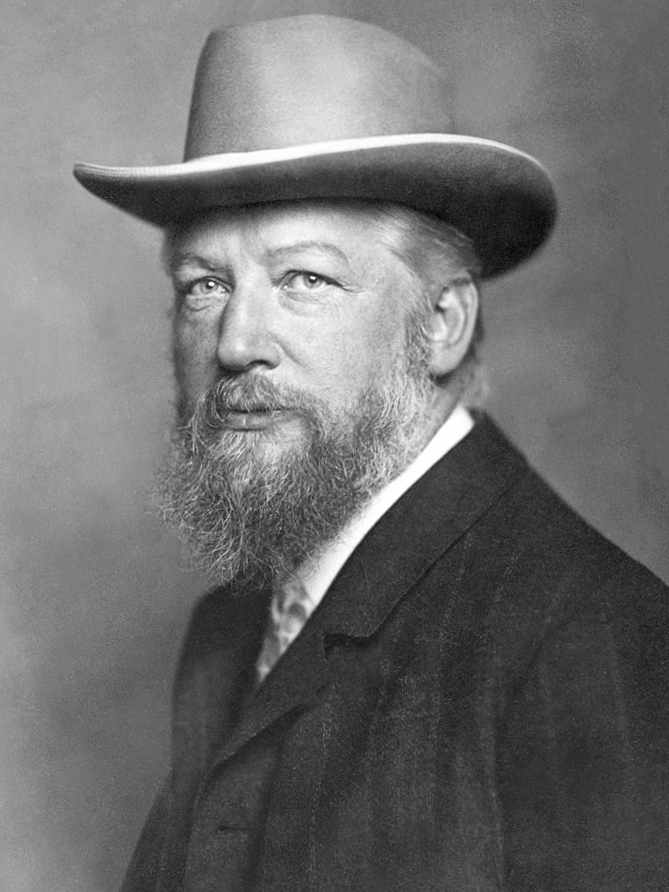
Wilhelm Ostwald, 1913

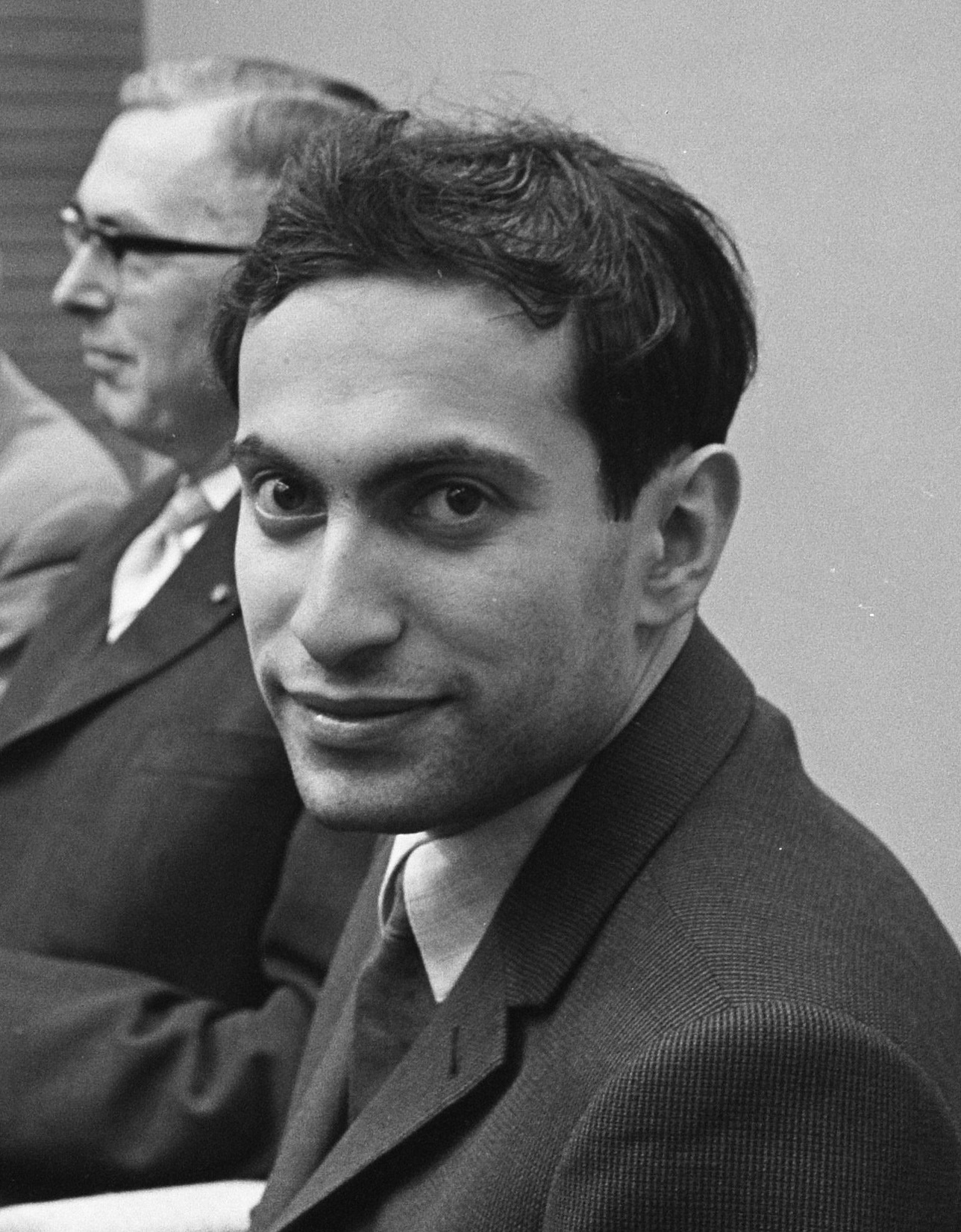
Mikhail Tal, 1962

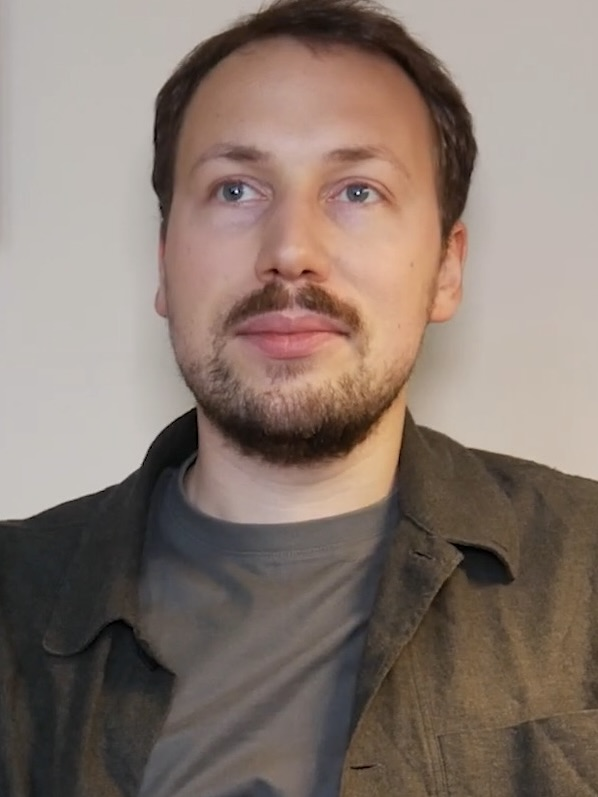
Gints Zilbalodis, 2025

- Sir Isaiah Berlin (1909–1997), British social and political theorist, philosopher and historian of ideas
- Emil Friedrich von Boetticher (1836–1907), politician, burgomaster of Riga
- Ottilie von Bistram (1859–1931), pioneer in the struggle for female access to education.
- Friedrich Heinrich von Boetticher (1826–1902), German publisher, bookseller, scholar and art historian
- Deniss Čalovskis (born 1985), Latvian computer hacker who created the Gozi virus
- Valdis Dombrovskis (born 1971), Latvian politician and EU Commissioner
- Laila Freivalds (born 1942), former Swedish Minister for Justice and Deputy Prime Minister of Sweden
- Juris Hartmanis (1928–2022), Latvian–American computer scientist who won the 1993 Turing Award
- Nicolai Hartmann (1882–1950), Baltic German philosopher and important metaphysician
- Johann Gottfried Herder (1744–1803), German philosopher, theologian, poet and literary critic
- David Hilchen (1561–1610), Renaissance humanist and politician
- Albert Woldemar Hollander (1796–1868), German educator and pedagog
- Yeshayahu Leibowitz (1903–1994), Israeli public intellectual and polymath
- Dorothea Lieven (1785–1857), a Baltic German noblewoman and an influential figure among diplomatic, political, and social circles
- Yosef Mendelevich (born 1947), Jewish refusenik from the Soviet Union, known as a "Prisoner of Zion"
- Ernst Munzinger (1887–1945), German Abwehr (Army intelligence) officer, later anti-Nazi
- Valters Nollendorfs (born 1931), chairman of the board of the Museum of the Occupation of Latvia
- Alfred Rosenberg (1892–1946), Baltic German theorist and ideologue of the Nazi Party
- Maria Skobtsova (1891–1945), a Russian noblewoman, poet, nun, and member of the French Resistance
- Johann Steinhauer (1705–1779), Latvian entrepreneur, social reformer and landowner
- Charlotte Wahl (1817–1899), Latvian-born philanthropist
- Tatiana Warsher (1880–1960), Russian archaeologist known for her studies of Pompeii
- Duke Alexander of Württemberg (1804–1881), dynastic ruler of the Kingdom of Württemberg
- Pauline Therese of Württemberg (1800–1873), Queen of Württemberg by marriage

=== Arts ===
- Rutanya Alda (born 1942), Latvian–American actress
- Mikhail Baryshnikov (born 1948), classical ballet dancer, choreographer and actor
- Léopold Bernhard Bernstamm (1859–1939), Russian sculptor
- Lilita Bērziņa (1903–1983), Latvian actress
- Gunnar Birkerts (1925–2017), Latvian-American architect
- Mārtiņš Brauns (1951–2021), Latvian composer and musician
- Leonīds Breikšs (1908–1942), Latvian poet, author and newspaper editor
- Jacob W. Davis (born Jākobs Jufess, 1831–1908), American tailor who invented modern jeans
- Mikhail Eisenstein (1867–1920), Latvian civil engineer and architect
- Sergei Eisenstein (1898–1948), Soviet Russian film director who filmed Battleship Potemkin
- Heinz Erhardt (1909–1979), Baltic German comedian, musician and entertainer
- Artur Fonvizin (1883–1973), Soviet painter of watercolours
- Elīna Garanča (born 1976), Latvian operatic mezzo-soprano
- Philippe Halsman (1906–1979), American portrait photographer
- Nora Ikstena (1969–2026), Latvian writer and cultural manager
- Don Jaffe (born 1933), composer
- Mariss Jansons (1943–2019), Latvian conductor
- Aivars Kalējs (born 1951), Latvian composer, organist and pianist
- Marats Kasems (born 1990), journalist and former editor-in-chief of Sputnik Lithuania
- Gidon Kremer (born 1947), Latvian classical violinist and conductor
- Barbara von Krüdener (1764–1824), Baltic German author, religious mystic and Pietist Lutheran theologian
- Ivan Krylov (1769–1844), Russian fable writer
- DJ Lethal (born Leor Dimant in 1972), American music producer
- Alan Melikdjanian (born 1980), Latvian–American independent filmmaker known as Captain Disillusion
- Armands Melnbārdis, musician and recording artist
- Vera Mukhina (1889–1953), Soviet sculptor and painter
- Raimonds Pauls (born 1936), Latvian composer and piano player
- Kristjan Jaak Peterson (1801–1822), Estonian poet
- Valentin Pikul (1928–1990), Soviet historical novelist
- Michael Polakovs (1923–2009), American circus clown and actor
- Rosa von Praunheim (1942–2025), German filmmaker and gay rights activist
- Lauma Reinholde (1906–1986), composer, pianist and teacher
- Marie Seebach (1829–1897), German actress
- Ksenia Solo (born 1987), Latvian–Canadian actress and activist
- Gints Zilbalodis (born 1994), Latvian Academy Award-winning filmmaker, animator and composer

=== Science ===
- Ernst von Bergmann (1836–1907), Baltic German surgeon, pioneer of aseptic surgery
- Walter von Boetticher (1853–1945), German historian, genealogist and physician
- Jakob Benjamin Fischer (1731–1793), Baltic German naturalist and apothecary
- Johann Anton Güldenstädt (1745–1781), naturalist and explorer
- Lola Hoffmann (1904–1988), physiologist and psychiatrist
- Charles Kalme (1939–2002), American mathematician and international master of chess
- Karlis Kaufmanis (1910–2003), astronomer who lectured that the Star of Bethlehem was a conjunction in 7 BC of the planets Jupiter and Saturn
- Mstislav Keldysh (1911–1978), Soviet mathematician who worked on the first artificial satellite
- George Nagobads (1921–2023), American physician and recipient of the Paul Loicq Award
- Wilhelm Ostwald (1853–1932), Baltic German chemist and winner of the Nobel Prize in Chemistry in 1909
- Eliyahu Rips (1948-2024) Israeli mathematician, winner of Erdős Prize (1979)
- Georg August Schweinfurth (1836–1925), Baltic German botanist and ethnologist who explored East Central Africa.
- Georg von Tiesenhausen (1914–2018), Baltic German American rocket scientist
- Juris Upatnieks (1936–2026), Latvian–American physicist, inventor, and pioneer in the field of holography
- Friedrich Zander (1887–1933), Baltic German engineer who designed the first Soviet liquid-fuelled rocket
- Walter Zapp (1905–2003), Baltic German inventor who created the Minox subminiature camera
- Nathan A. Zepell (1915–1982), inventor and engineer

=== Sport ===
- Helmuts Balderis (born 1952), Latvian former ice hockey player
- Dāvis Bertāns (born 1992), professional basketball player
- Jānis Beinarovičs (1907–1967), wrestler
- Andris Biedriņš (born 1986), former basketball player
- Sergejs Boldaveško (born 1970), retired ice hockey player
- Teddy Blueger (born 1994), ice hockey player for the Vancouver Canucks
- Tanhum Cohen-Mintz (1939–2014), Israeli basketball player
- Elīna Dikaioulaku (born 1989), basketball player for Israeli team Elitzur Ramla
- Kaspars Dubra (born 1990), footballer with 50 caps for Latvia
- Zemgus Girgensons (born 1994), ice hockey player who was the highest-ever drafted Latvian in the NHL entry draft
- Jørgen Hviid (1916–2001), Danish and Latvian athlete in ice hockey, speed skating, and sailing
- Artūrs Irbe (born 1967), Latvian professional ice hockey coach and former goaltender
- Raitis Ivanāns (born 1979), ice hockey player
- Miervaldis Jurševskis (1921–2014), Latvian–Canadian chess master and professional artist
- Matīss Kivlenieks (1996–2021), ice hockey goaltender for the Columbus Blue Jackets
- Rūdolfs Kundrāts (1907–1954), footballer and referee with 19 caps for Latvia
- Kitija Laksa (born 1996), basketball player for WNBA team, Dallas Wings
- Elvis Merzļikins (born 1994), ice hockey goaltender for the Columbus Blue Jackets
- Anete Muižniece-Brice (born 1962), former basketball player
- Aron Nimzowitsch (1886–1935), Latvian chess master and writer who wrote the book My System
- Jeļena Ostapenko (born 1997), women's tennis player and 2017 French Open – Women's singles winner
- Sandis Ozoliņš (born 1972), ice hockey player, seven-time NHL All-Star, and Stanley Cup champion
- Marians Pahars (born 1976), footballer with 75 caps for Latvia
- Harald Schlegelmilch (born 1987), racing driver
- Alexei Shirov (born 1972), Latvian–Spanish chess grandmaster who was ranked world No. 2 in 1994
- Pēteris "Peter" Skudra (born April 24, 1973), Latvian former professional ice hockey goaltender and head coach
- Karlīne Štāla (born 1986), racing driver
- Patricija Stalidzane (born 2002), racing driver
- Mikhail Tal (1936–1992), Soviet–Latvian chess grandmaster and 8th World Chess Champion
- Valdis Valters (born 1957) retired basketball player

Others

- Margaret Romans (1912–2025), supercentenarian and oldest Latvian-born person in history

== Twin towns – sister cities ==
Riga is twinned with:

- Aalborg, Denmark
- Almaty, Kazakhstan
- Astana, Kazakhstan
- Beijing, China
- Bordeaux, France
- Bremen, Germany
- Cairns, Australia
- Dallas, United States
- Florence, Italy
- Kaunas, Lithuania
- Kyiv, Ukraine
- Kobe, Japan
- Norrköping, Sweden
- Pori, Finland
- Rostock, Germany
- Santiago, Chile
- Stockholm, Sweden
- Suzhou, China
- Taipei, Taiwan
- (United Kingdom) Slough, England
- Tallinn, Estonia
- Tartu, Estonia
- Tashkent, Uzbekistan
- (Georgia (country)) Tbilisi, Georgia
- Vilnius, Lithuania
- Warsaw, Poland
- Yerevan, Armenia

Riga also cooperates with:

- Brisbane, Australia
- Seattle, United States

== See also ==
- Riga Charter, on cultural heritage conservation, adopted here in 2000
- Riga Region
- Riga Salsa Festival

== Bibliography ==
- Grava, Sigurd. "The Urban Heritage of the Soviet Regime The Case of Riga, Latvia". Journal of the American Planning Association 59.1 (1993): 9–30.
- Kropotkin, Peter Alexeivitch; Bealby, John Thomas (1911). "Riga" . In Chisholm, Hugh (ed.). Encyclopædia Britannica. Vol. 23 (11th ed.). Cambridge University Press. p. 337.
- Šolks, Guntis, Gita Dejus, and Krists Legzdiņš. "Transformation of Historic Industrial Areas in Riga". Book of Proceedings. (2012) online.
