= Albert Razbaum =

Latvian flautist

Albert Evgenyevich Razbaum (Leningrad, born 4 December 1937) is a Latvian flautist. A 1960 graduate from the Leningrad Conservatory and 1963 co-winner of the All-Union Music Performers Competition, he started teaching at the Latvian State Conservatory the following year. He successively joined the Latvian Opera Orchestra in 1959, the Latvian State Symphony in 1966 and the Moscow Chamber Orchestra in 1968. In 1988 he received the Honored Artist of the RSFSR medal.

The Albert Razbaum International Flute Competition, launched in 2020 (and eventually postponed to June 2021 due to the COVID-19 pandemic) by the Moscow Flute Center, was named after him.

== Premieres ==
| Date | Venue | Composer | Composition | Joined by | Source |
|---|---|---|---|---|---|
| 1963 | Riga | Sofia Gubaidulina | Allegro rustico | Braun | |
