= Inese Galante =

Latvian soprano opera singer (born 1954)

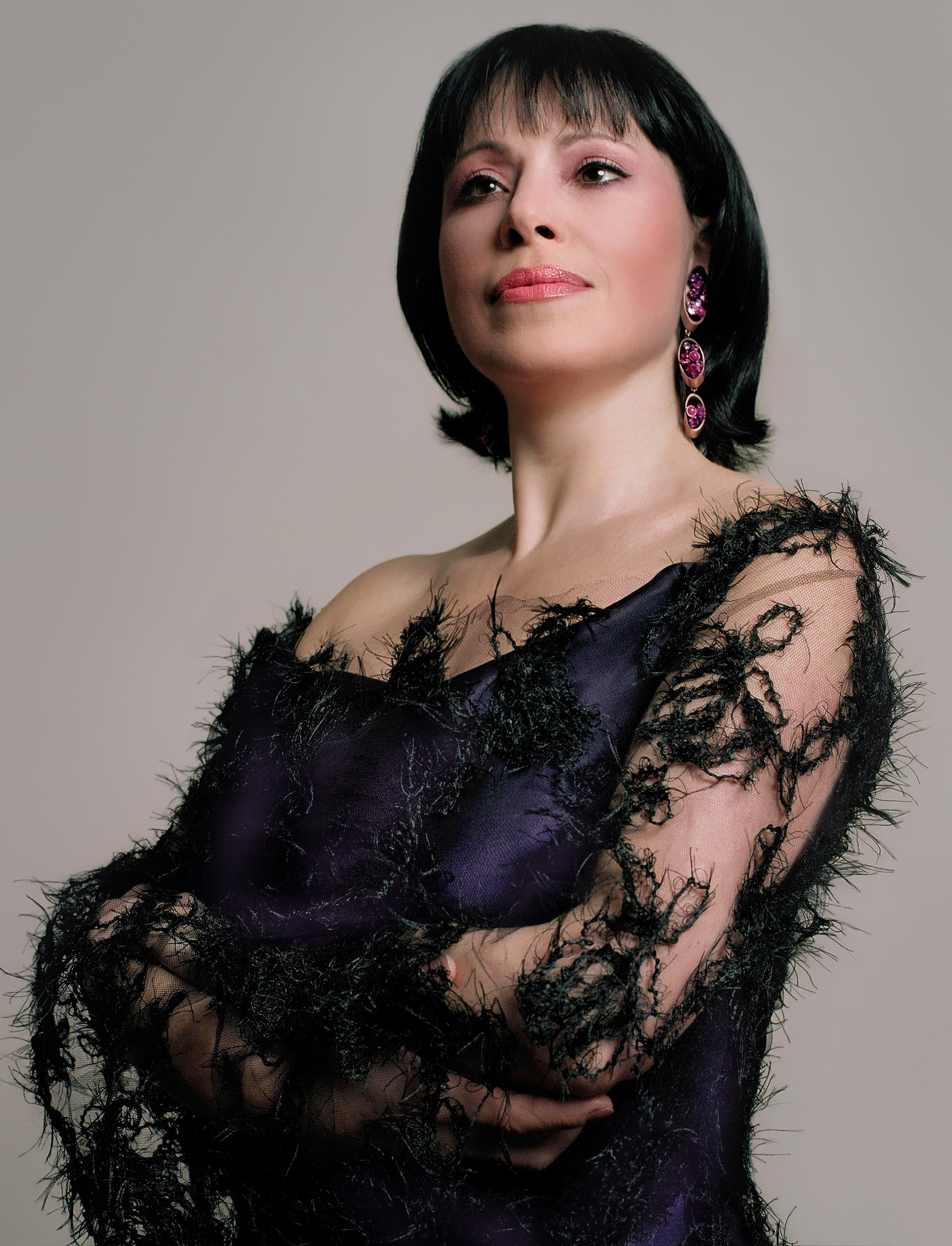
- Galante in 2011

Background information
- Born: March 12, 1954 (age 72); Riga, Latvia
- Genres: Opera
- Occupation: Soprano singer
- Instrument: Vocals

Inese Galante (born 12 March 1954) is a Latvian soprano opera singer. Galante is known for a great beauty of tone, nuanced pianissimos and sensitive command of dynamics and colour. Her performance of Vladimir Vavilov's Ave Maria (often attributed to Giulio Caccini), from her "Debut" album (1995) attracted worldwide interest in the piece.

== Career ==
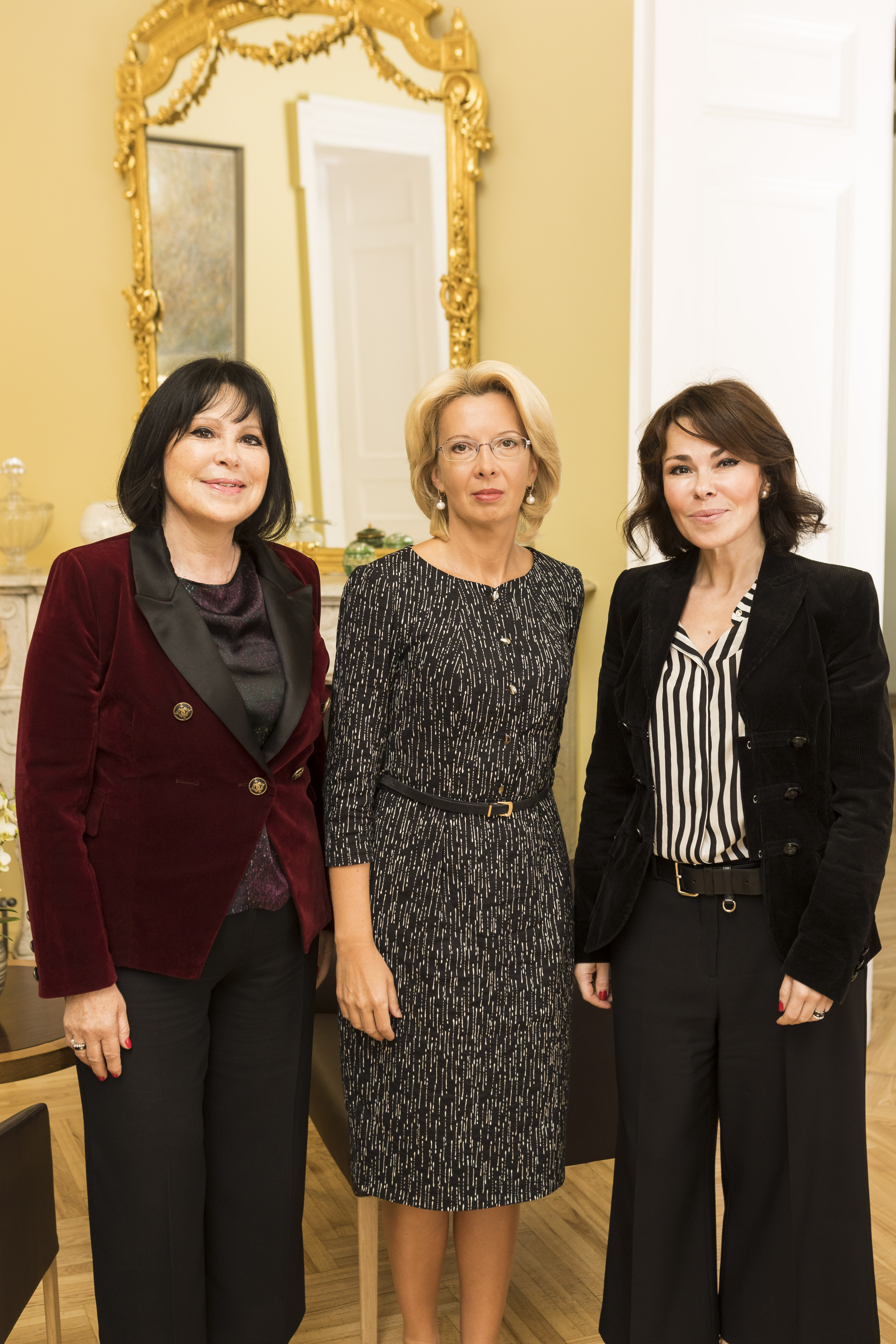
August 29, 2017. Speaker of the Saeima Ināra Mūrniece meets with opera singer Ines Galante and Director of the Ines Galante Foundation Diāna Galante.

Galante was born in Riga to a musical family. She entered the Latvian Academy of Music in Riga in 1977. While still a student at the Academy, she became a soloist of the Latvian National Opera. Parallel to her work in Riga she was engaged in opera productions at other theatres, particularly at the Kirov Opera (Mariinsky theatre) in Saint Petersburg, Russia where she had a fruitful collaboration with conductor Valery Gergiev.

From 1991 until 1999, Galante was soloist at National Theatre Mannheim and Deutsche Oper am Rhein in Düsseldorf. Since then she has been touring and performing all over the world. Galante's voice has been heard at the Théâtre des Champs-Élysées and the Festival de Radio France et Montpellier (France), at the St Denis Festival, the Newport Music Festival and the Gibson Hall (USA), at the Barbican Centre, the Royal Albert Hall, the Wigmore Hall and Kensington Palace (London), at the Royal Swedish Opera, and at the Kremlin and the Bolshoi Theatre (Moscow), where she made her debut as Adriana in Cilea's opera Adriana Lecouvreur in the La Scala production. In 2001 Galante appeared in concert in Rotterdam together with José Carreras.

Galante has worked with such conductors as Yehudi Menuhin, Valery Gergiev, Zubin Mehta, Evelino Pidò, Myung-whun Chung, Miguel Ángel Gómez Martínez, Neeme Järvi, Carl Davis, John Mauceri, Stefan Soltész, Eric Klaas, Antonio Pappano, Steven Mercurio, Alexander Vedernikov, Dmitri Kitayenko, Vassily Sinaisky, Alexander Rahbari, Lawrence Renes and Vladimir Fedoseyev.

== Operatic roles ==
The first major operatic role of Galante was Violetta in Verdi's La traviata at her graduation exam at the Music Academy. Since that time Galante has performed this role more than 100 times on various stages of the world. Among Galante's other roles are:

- Olympia in Offenbach's The Tales of Hoffmann
- Snegurochka in Rimsky-Korsakov's The Snow Maiden
- Gilda in Verdi's Rigoletto
- Leonora in Verdi's Il trovatore
- Aida in Verdi's Aida
- Adina in Donizetti's L'elisir d'amore
- Lucia in Donizetti's Lucia di Lammermoor
- Rosina in Rossini's The Barber of Seville
- Corina in Rossini's Il viaggio a Reims
- Marguerite in Gounod's Faust
- Magda in Puccini's La rondine
- Cio-Cio-San in Puccini's Madama Butterfly
- Mimi in Puccini's La bohème
- Liu in Puccini's Turandot
- Lauretta in Puccini's Gianni Schicchi
- Manon Lescaut in Puccini's Manon Lescaut
- Micaela in Bizet's Carmen
- Adriana in Cilea's Adriana Lecouvreur
- Vivetta in Cilea's L'arlesiana
- Pamina in Mozart's The Magic Flute
- Elvira in Mozart's Don Giovanni
- Nedda in Leoncavallo's Pagliacci
- Beauty in Oliver's The Beauty and Beast
- Naiad in Richard Strauss' Ariadne auf Naxos
- 3rd Norn in Wagner's Götterdämmerung
- Ortlinde in Wagner's Die Walküre
- Euridice in Gluck's Orfeo ed Euridice
- Giuditta in Lehár's Giuditta
- Iolanta in Tchaikovsky's Iolanta
- Lisa in Tchaikovsky's The Queen of Spades

In addition to performing in operas Galante frequently sings in concerts in Verdi's Requiem, Mozart's Requiem, in the works of Bruckner, Poulenc, Schubert, Brahms and other composers. In 2008 Galante performed Richard Strauss's The Four Last Songs for soprano and orchestra which was at the same time premiere of this work in Russia.

Galante is patroness of the international music festival Summertime. She has been awarded The Order of the Three Stars by the President of the Latvian Republic.

== Discography ==
Galante's album "Debut" was awarded Gold (1999) and Platinum (2001) disc in the Netherlands after its sales exceeded 200,000; the disc Arietta was recognized by BBC to be the best in the nomination of classical music (2000). The disc of opera arias by Tchaikovsky (BMG, the Royal Opera orchestra, conductor Neeme Järvi) was considered to be exceptionally brilliant, marking out the scene of Tatyana's letter as the best interpretation of recent 20 years. The disc Arias from Verdi's late operas got the Gramophone editor choice (October, 2003). Classic CD described her Cavatina of Norma as "...a Norma to rival that of Callas...". She is described as one of the most notable followers of the legendary singer. Her concerts are recorded by Classic FM and BBC.

=== LP ===
- Mendelssohn, Three motets for female voice and organ. Woman's Folk Сhorus "Amber" (Sieviešu tautas koris "Dzintars") Conductor Imants Cepītis, Aivars Kalējs Riga Cathedral organ, solistes Inessa Galante, Antra Bigača, Olga Žarikova, Ingūna Lazdiņa. Melodiya 1987
- Jewish folk songs - Inessa Galante & Jānis Sproģis & The Latvian SSR Chorus (Recorded live at the Grand Hall of the Moscow Conservatory June 9, 1987) Melodiya 1989
- Spiritual music ("Gariga muzika") music of Jāzeps Vītols. Melodiya, Latvia 1991
- Сhorus "Versija" - Ziemas svētkos / "Šai svētā naktī". Ritonis, Latvia, 1991

=== CD ===
- "Songs of Amber" - Songs of Women's Folk Chorus Dzintars (solo Inessa Galante) - 1983-Remastered 1990
- "Inese Galante. Soprano" - Latvian National Symphony Orchestra Conductor Aleksandrs Vilumanis 1995 (Gold and Platinum CD). Released as "Debut" on Campion.
- "Heroines" – Gounod, Cilea, Puccini - Campion Records 1995
- "Velreiz" ("again, encore") - Albinoni arias 1996
- Maks Goldins Eighteen Jewish Folk Songs & Rachmaninoff - Romantic Songs - Campion 1996
- "Encore" - Johann Strauss, Weber (compilation) 1997
- "Musica Sacra" – From Riga Cathedral. Paula Licite Ave Maria etc. cond. Juris Klavins (compilation of live recordings 1989–1996) - Campion 1997
- "The Tchaikovsky Experience" – Sergei Leiferkus, Marina Shaguch, Alexander Fedin. Covent Garden Orchestra conducted by Neeme Järvi, BMG 1997
- "Latvian Sacral Music" - solisti Inessa Galante, Dita Kalniņa (soprano), Ingus Pētersons (tenor), Aivars Kalējs (organ), Dita Krenberga (flute), cond. Kaspars Putniņš - 1997
- "La Traviata" – Verdi. (2 CD's Live recorded. Latvian National Opera. 1989) - 1998
- "Arietta" – Baroque Arias, London Musici. Conducted by M. Stephenson (Best recording of the year 2000 –as reviewed by BBC, FM classics.) - 1999
- "Russian Recital" – at the Wigmore Hall. Roger Vignoles (piano). (BBC live recording 1999) - 2000
- "ABC (Adagio in C minor)" – Albinoni. Conducted by Alexander Vilumanis, "Soprano arias" – Bach J.S., „Amarilli mia bella“ – Caccini. Conducted by Mark Stephenson (conductor) - 2001
- "The Galante Choice" - 2001
- "Galante forever ..." - 2001
- "Mass in C major, Exultate, jubilate Ergo interest" – Mozart. Czechoslovak Chamber Philharmonic. Conducted by D. Bostock - 2001
- "Verdi Galante. Arias from Verdi’s late works" – Latvian National Symphony Orchestra. Conducted by Terje Mikkelsen Campion - 2003
- "Confesso" - Inessa Galante & Henk van Twillert (baritone saxophone) - 2006
- "Requiem" - Mozart. conducted by Andres Mustonen - 2007
- "Stabat Mater" - Pergolesi. Stradella - Pieta Signore. Vivaldi Stabat mater. Inessa Galante, Sergejs Jēgers (countertenor) chamber ensemble conducted by Andris Veismanis - 2008
- “Ave Maria” Inessa Galante. Organ: Aivars Kalejs in Riga Cathedral - Release December 17. 2008
- "LA GALANTE THE SOUL OF RIGA" (2 CD's) Inessa Galante. Organ: Aivars Kalejs and Mattias Wager. Release 14-07-2011 Dom Riga

=== Not published live records ===
- "Iolanta" - Tchaikovsky. Live records. Paris Theatre Chatelet. 15.3.1996
- "L Arlesiana" - Cilea. Live records. Montpellier, Festival de Radio France 07.1996
- "Gianni Schicchi" - Puccini. Live records. Muziekcentrum Vredenburg, Utrecht. 25.04.1996
- "Madame Butterfly" - Puccini. - Live records. Latvian National Opera. 1999, 2000
- "Manon Lescaut" - Puccini. Live records. Royal Operahouse in Stockholm, Sweden. 13.02.2006, 07.02.2009

== Sources ==
Silvija Lice: "Inese Galante", by Publishing House "Liktenstasti", Riga, 1999,ISBN 9984-611-29-9
