= Dārziņš =

Family name

Origin
- Origin: Latvian
- Meaning: "little garden"

Dārziņš (Old orthography: Dahrsin; feminine: Dārziņa) is a Latvian topographic surname, derived from the Latvian word for "garden" (dārzs). Individuals with the surname include:

- Emīls Dārziņš (1875–1910), Latvian composer, conductor and music critic
- Lauris Dārziņš (born 1985), Latvian ice hockey player
- Volfgangs Dārziņš (1906–1962), Latvian composer
