= Marģeris Zariņš =

Latvian composer and writer (1910–1993)

Marģeris Zariņš (24 May 1910, Jaunpiebalga – 27 February 1993, Riga) was a Latvian composer and writer. He was an author of symphonic and vocal symphonic music, choir music, vocal chamber music, cantatas, oratories and operas; contemporary picaresque novels and short stories. He is considered to be the first representative of the Postmodern style in Latvian literature.

== Biography ==
His father was a choir conductor, organist and organ builder. He completed his primary education at Riga Gymnasium #2, by which time he was already performing as an organist. After 1925, he attended the Jelgava Teachers' College then, in 1928, studied organ, piano and composition at the Riga Conservatory. He slowly gained recognition as a composer while working as a teacher and a librarian.

Following the Soviet Occupation, he was appointed musical director at the Dailes Theatre (1940–1950), and served as chairman of the Latvian Composers' Union (1951–1952, 1956–1968). He was also the Director of the Latvian National Symphony Orchestra for the 1951–1952 season. Although he was forced to compose in the acceptable Soviet musical styles, he attempted to experiment whenever possible.

Toward the end of the 1960s, he turned to writing. In 1969, the journal Literature and Art published his first novel: The Champs Elysées Mozart. His best known novel, Viltotais Fausts jeb pārlabota un papildināta pavārgrāmata (translated as Mock Faustus) came out in 1973. From 1956 to 1968, he was Chairman of the Latvian Composers' Union.

== Works ==
His musical output is large and diverse. His best works display a theatrically concrete, striking imagination, expressive modifications of style and genre, artistic skill, and exceptionally diverse forms of humour. He composed five operas (of which four have been performed at the Latvian National Opera), two musical comedies, vocal-orchestral works, six concertos, chamber song-cycles, organ music, music for theatre and film, and over 100 songs for choir, including ten song-cycles.

In the post-war period, he maintained and developed the approach to folklore that had already appeared in the choral arrangements of the younger generation of composers in the 1930s, mainly in the works of Volfgangs Dārziņš and Jānis Kalniņš. More than his predecessors, however, he chose to develop the elements of dance, humour and play found in folk music. From 1960s he represents stylistically vivid, sometimes paradoxical forms of musical expression and widely to use stylization, quotations and musical allusions in various ways. This new vision brought with it freedom of thought and served to erode the standardized aesthetics and dogmatic thought which formed the cornerstone of Soviet ideology.

== Notable works ==
=== Writings ===
- Viltotais Fausts... (1973) – grotesque novel
- Rūķi un pūķi (1993) - children's book

=== Musical compositions ===
Operas

- Uz jauno krastu [Towards the New Shore] (1953)
- Zaļās dzirnavas [The Green Mill] (1958)
- Nabagu opera [Beggars' Story] (1965)
- Opera uz laukuma [Opera on the Square] (1969)
- Svētā Maurīcija brīnumdarbi [The Miracle of St. Mauritius] – comic opera-ballet (1974)
