= Alfrēds Kalniņš =

Latvian musician (1879–1951)

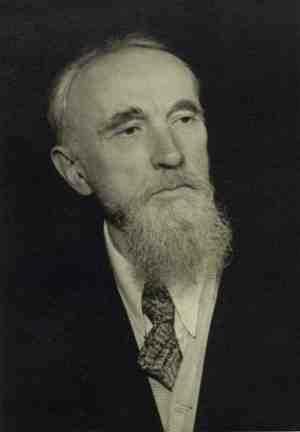
- Born: 23 August 1879; Cēsis, Russian Empire (now Latvia)
- Died: 23 December 1951 (aged 72); Riga, Latvian SSR (now Latvia)
- Education: Saint Petersburg Conservatory
- Known for: Music

Alfrēds Bruno Jānis Kalniņš (23 August 1879, in Cēsis, Governorate of Livonia – 23 December 1951, in Riga, Latvian SSR) was a Latvian composer, organist, pedagogue, music critic and conductor; the founder of national Latvian opera. Kalniņš is primarily remembered for his national opera Baņuta (1920).

== Life ==
Kalniņš took piano and violin lessons at an early age. He attended the school of music in Riga. He often visited the Riga theatre, where he could listen to operas and concerts. He made acquaintance with Oskars Šepskis (1850-1914), a composer and organist, who gave him private lessons.

From 1897 until 1901 he studied organ and composition at Saint Petersburg Conservatory. After a short stay in Riga, which he spent writing a series of songs, he accepted a post as an organist at the Saint Nicholas Church in Pärnu in 1903. At present Pärnu is located in Estonia, but then it belonged to the Russian Governorate of Livonia. Kalniņš also gave music lessons at the local grammar school and conducted the school choir. In Pärnu his son Jānis Kalniņš, who would become a composer too, was born in 1904.

Kalniņš stayed in Pärnu until 1911. In that year he took the post of organist at the Church of Saint Anne at Liepāja, where he also conducted the choir of the local music society. Apart from the church services he also played organ concertos and was involved in the restoration of the church organ.

In 1914 the First World War broke out. In 1915 Liepājā fell into the hands of the Germans. Kalniņš fled to Tartu (like Pärnu then in Livonia and now in Estonia). There he worked as an organist and a conductor and gave private music lessons.

When in 1918 Tartu fell into the hands of the Germans too, he returned to Liepāja. In 1919 he accepted a job as head of the Department of Music at the Ministry of Education and chairman of the Music Council at Riga, now the capital of independent Latvia. Besides, he acted as organist of Saint James’s Church (now Saint James’s Cathedral), wrote criticisms and conducted the students choir of the University of Latvia. In 1926 he acted as chief conductor at the 6th Latvian Song and Dance Festival.

In the years 1927-1933 he lived in New York, where he worked as an organist, played concertos and gave music lessons.

In 1933 Kalniņš returned to Riga, where he took the post of organist at Riga Cathedral. Between 1944 and 1948 he was the Rector of the Latvian Academy of Music, where he gave organ lessons too. In 1948 he retired, and died three years later.

In 2022, all organ works by Alfrēds Kalniņš were published both in a print edition and on a CD recording. The editor and performer is the Riga Cathedral organist Aigars Reinis.

=== Monuments ===
On Kalniņš’s one hundredth birthday in 1979, a bronze bust of Kalniņš was unveiled in Cēsis, his place of birth. In 2004 it was replaced to the local school of music, which carries his name: Alfrēda Kalniņa Cēsu Mūzikas vidusskola. In 1979 Riga got a statue of the composer too. It is located at the opera building. In Viestura Park, also in Riga, there is a monument portraying eight Latvian composers, among them Alfrēds Kalniņš.

== Compositions ==
Kalniņš was a very prolific composer, who wrote hundreds of songs, both for solo voice with piano accompaniment and for choir. Of his six cantatas the best known is Jūra (‘The Sea’), and numerous organ works.

In 1918 Kalniņš started working on his most famous piece of music, the opera Baņuta, which went into premiere in 1920 in Riga. It is the first opera with a libretto in Latvian. When Kalniņš lived in New York, he rewrote a big part of its music. This version of the opera was performed for the first time in 1937. In 1940, under Soviet rule, Kalniņš had to change the end of the opera. In the original version the principal person Baņuta and her lover Vižuts commit suicide; now the opera got a happy end. On 5 June 1982 the opera was performed for the first time in the West, namely in New York. This production was based on the 1937 version. The 1940 version has not been performed since. The opera has always remained popular, especially in Latvia, and is still performed from time to time.

Kalniņš’s second opera Salinieki (‘The island dwellers’, 1926) is lesser known.

Moreover, he composed a ballet, Staburags, an orchestral suite and pieces for organ and piano.

=== Organ Solo ===
- Phantasie (1901)
- Pastorale No. 1 (1913)
- Introduzione et Allegro (1928)
- Cloister Idyll (1928)
- Scherzo (1928)
- Christmas Cradle Song (1928)
- Wedding March (1936)
- Procession (1937)
- Variations on a Theme by Jānis Kalniņš (1938)
- Agitato (1938)
- On Saturday's Eve (1939)
- A Solemn Introduction from the Opera "Baņuta" (1920/1939)
- Funeral March from the Opera "Baņuta" (1920/1939)
- Prelude (1941)
- Pastorale No. 2 (1943)
- Variations on a Theme by Jāzeps Vītols (1949)
- Hymn to My Homeland (1908-1911)

== Edition ==
- Alfrēds Kalniņš: Ērģeļmūzika / Organ Music, edited by Aigars Reinis. Riga (Latvia): Musica Baltica, 2022, ISMN 979-0-2650-3046-1.

== Recordings ==
- Alfrēds Kalniņš: Organ Music. Aigars Reinis/Walcker Organ at Riga Cathedral. 2 CD's. Riga (Latvia): Skani, 2022.
- Baņuta, Choir of the Latvian National Opera, Symphony Orchestra of Latvian TV and Radio, dir. Aleksandrs Viļumanis. Rīgas Skaņu RS010, 1996 (2 cds, full libretto in Latvian and English).
- Jānis Kalniņš, Potter’s Field, Latvian Radio and Consum Choirs, Latvian National Symphony Orchestra, dir. Andrejs Jansons / Alfrēds Kalniņš, The Sea, Latvian Radio, Consum and Versija Choirs, Latvian National Opera Orchestra, dir. Andrejs Jansons (Cantatas). Latvian Concert NYLCC 007, 2004.
- Organ Music: Prelude, Pastorale in B major, Fantasia for organ, Lullaby, Variations on a Theme of Jāzeps Vītols - Performed by Pēteris Sīpolnieks, Melodiya LP C10-12381-2, 1980.

== Sources ==
- A document about Kalniņš’s life, in Latvian, Word format
- Biruta Sūrmane, Text in the booklet accompanying the cd Baņuta, RS010, 1996.
