= Don Jaffe =

German composer

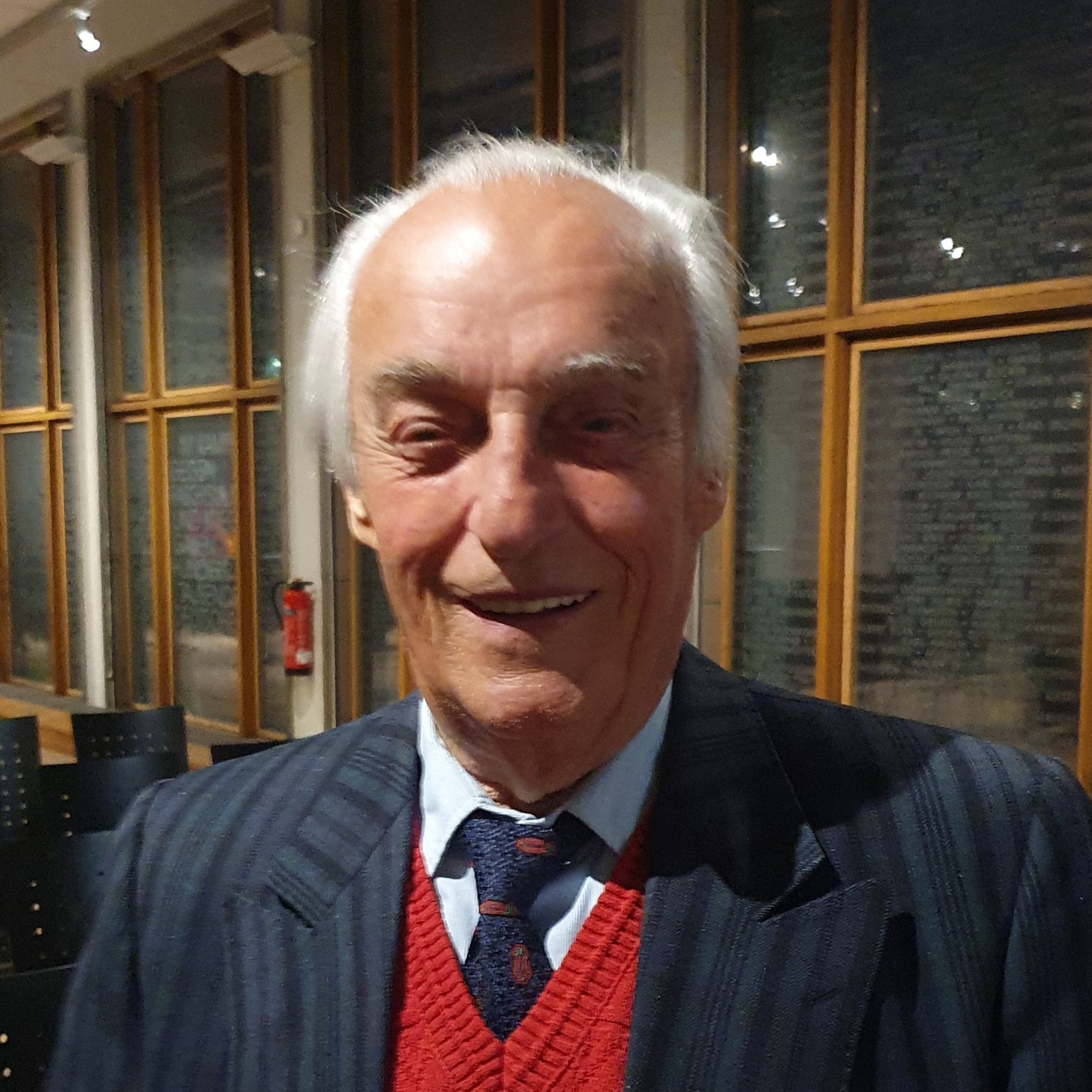
2025 Photo of Don Jaffé

Don Jaffe (or Jaffé) (Hebrew: דון יפה; born 24 January 1933) is a German-Israeli-Latvian musician and composer.

== Biography ==
=== Family ===
Jaffe was born in 1933 in Riga, Latvia, to Ella Jaffe who had attended a German business school in Riga, and Jakov Jaffe, who had studied electrical engineering in Berlin. After his studies, Jakov Jaffe returned to Riga. In 1941, when the German Wehrmacht conquered Latvia, the Jaffe family – Jakov, Ella, Don, and his two siblings – had to flee to Siberia.

After World War II, the Jaffes decided to return to Riga. All their relatives who couldn't escape to the Soviet Union were murdered. In 1956, Don Jaffe married Elza Jaffe, born Peterson. They have two children: Ramon (born 1962, a cellist) and Diana (born 1969), a book author and expert in gender marketing). Since 1975, Don Jaffe has lived in Bremen.

=== Career ===
At the age of fourteen, Jaffe started to learn Cello at the Emīls Dārziņš Music School, the junior music conservatory in Riga. In 1951, he was the first string player to graduate from this music school. Jaffe finished his studies there in only four years instead of the regular ten. From 1951 to 1956 he studied Cello at the Jāzeps Vītols Latvian Academy of Music in Riga.

After graduation, Jaffe worked as a soloist and chamber musician and gained international success. Jaffe also taught chamber music at the Jāzeps Vītols Latvian Academy of Music and cello the Emīls Dārziņš Music School.

Pushed by growing antisemitism in the Soviet Union, Don Jaffe and his family emigrated to Israel in 1971. Jaffe immediately received a position at the Jerusalem Symphony Orchestra and started teaching cello at the Jerusalem Academy of Music and Dance (then Rubin Academy of Music). In the Yom-Kippur-War, Jaffe volunteered for the Israeli Defence Forces.

In 1974, the Jaffes moved to Germany, where, as Don Jaffe put it, „their cultural roots lie“. Jaffe started to work as a solo cellist at the Berlin Symphony Orchestra. In 1975, Jaffe became a member of the Bremen Philharmonic Orchestra. From 1976 to 1992 he taught cello at the Bremen University of the Arts. In 1985, the Senate of Bremen, which is the state government of Bremen, appointed Jaffe as chamber musician.

=== Composer ===
In 1997, Jaffe started to work as a composer. His works are influenced by both his biography and Jewish history and often focus on the Holocaust and its victims. “It’s my mission to create musical monuments,“ Jaffe said. But he also stresses: “The generation of the grandchildren is not responsible for the evil deeds of their ancestors.“

== Works ==
- Passionen, Sonata for violoncello solo, 1997
- Shoa, Sonata for violoncello solo, 1997
- Serefinas Träume, Sonatino for violoncello and piano, 1998
- Darum siehe, die Zeit wird kommen, String trio, 1999
- Todesfuge, Poem by Paul Celan, for violoncello, organ, and choir, 200
- Lior, Sonatino for violoncello and piano, 2002
- Prolog zu Rabbi von Bacherach after Heinrich Heine, for violoncello and voice, 2002
- Saulkrasti, fantasy suite for violoncello and harp, 2003
- Die letzten Tage, Suite for violoncello and violin, 2004
- Ballade über die Forelle und das Leben des Franz Schuberts, for violoncello, violin, and harp, 2006
- Via dolorosa ebraica, Sonata for violoncello and piano, 2007
- Durch die Zeit, for violoncello and organ, 2008
- Choro-Symphonie, for choir and violoncello, 2008
- Anni horribili, chamber symphony, 2010
- Symphonie El sueno de la razón produce monstruos (The Sleep of Reason Produces Monsters) after Francisco de Goya, symphony orchestra, 2011
- Exodus 1971, chamber symphony for cello, piano, and string orchestra, 2011
- Symphonischer Roman, double concert for viola, cello, and orchestra, 2012
- Perlenlicht, Sonatina for harp solo, 2014
- Triple Concerto for Violin, cello, and piano, 2016
- "Gefühle mit Brahms“, Viola, cello, and piano, 2017
- Concerto for Harp and cello, 2018
