= Romualds Kalsons =

Latvian composer (1936–2024)

Romualds Kalsons (7 September 1936 – 15 November 2024) was a Latvian composer. Born in Riga, he was a student of Ādolfs Skulte and Jāzeps Lindbergs. Kalsons taught at the Latvian Academy of Music from 1973 until 2009. He is known for his opera Pazudušais dēls (The Prodigal Son), after the 1893 play by Rūdolfs Blaumanis, and for his orchestral music. Kalsons died on 15 November 2024, at the age of 88.
