= Egils Siliņš =

Latvian musician

Egils Siliņš is a Latvian bass-baritone. He graduated from the Latvian Academy of Music and made his operatic debut at the Latvian National Opera in 1988. He has won multiple international singing competitions and since November 5, 2019, he is Chairman of the Board of the Latvian National Opera and Ballet.

== Early life and education ==
Siliņš was born in the Latvian city of Līgatne. He attended the Latvian Academy of Music and completed his education under professors Gurijs Antipovs and Leonīds Vīgners.

== Career ==
Siliņš made his debut on the opera stage at the Latvian National Opera in 1988 as the title role in Boito's Mefistofele. He has won multiple international singing competitions, the Grand Music Award and is the recipient of the Latvian Order of the Three Stars.

He was a soloist at the Oper Frankfurt (1990–1993), the Theater Basel (1993–1996), the Vienna State Opera and the Vienna Volksoper (1996–2000), where he made his debut as Méphistophélès in Gounod's Faust followed by the title role in Mussorgsky's Boris Gudonov in a production by Harry Kupfer. He made his debut at the Vienna State Opera in Bellini's I puritani. Other roles at the Vienna State Opera included the title role in Boito's Mefistofele, Silva in Verdi's Ernani, Raimondo in Donizetti's Lucia di Lammermoor, Rodolfo in Bellini's La sonnambula, Escamillo in Bizet's Carmen and Procida in Verdi's Les vêpres siciliennes. Also notable was his portrayal of the title role in Anton Rubinstein's The Demon at the Bregenz Festival in 1997, which was released as a recording in 1998. He has worked as a freelance artist since then. Amongst his most notable house debuts are the Metropolitan Opera in 2000 as Don Basilio in Rossini's Il barbiere di Siviglia, his Royal Opera House debut in 2011 in the title role in Wagner's Der fliegende Holländer and at the Bayreuth Festival in 2018 as the Heerrufer in Wagner's Lohengrin, as Antonio in Donizetti's Linda di Chamounix at La Scala and his first Klingsor in Wagner's Parsifal at the Lyric Opera of Chicago. He made his debut at La Monnaie as the Holländer, and sung his first Wotan/Wanderer in Wagner's Ring cycle in 2009 with Philippe Jordan conducting. They reunited for another production of the Ring at the Paris Opera in 2013. He also starred in the Ring at the Spring Festival in Tokyo in 2012.

He performed as Wotan at the Vienna State Opera in 2017 in Sven-Eric Bechtolf's production, as Jochanaan in Salome by Richard Strauss in 2018 with Andris Nelsons conducting at the Royal Opera House, as the Wanderer at the Bavarian State Opera in 2018 conducted by Kirill Petrenko, Grand Prêtre in Damiano Michieletto's 2016 production of Saint-Saëns' Samson et Dalila, Heerrufer in Claus Guth's 2017 production of Lohengrin, both with Philippe Jordan conducting, Barak in Die Frau ohne Schatten by Strauss at the Berlin State Opera in 2018 with conductor Simone Young, Wotan in concert version on tour with the Bayreuth Festival Orchestra in 2019, and Telramund in Lohengrin at the Vienna State Opera in 2020 with Valery Gergiev conducting.

He has also performed at several music festivals, including the Glyndebourne Festival, the Tanglewood Music Festival, the Savonlinna Opera Festival and Chorégies d'Orange, and is engaged worldwide as a Lieder and concert singer.

He has collaborated with many renowned conductors, such as Sir Colin Davis, Christoph von Dohnányi, Mariss Jansons, Zubin Mehta, Christian Thielemann, Riccardo Muti, Fabio Luisi, Seiji Ozawa, James Conlon, Nikolaus Harnoncourt, Philippe Jordan, Marcello Viotti, Marc Minkowski, Sir Andrew Davis, Vladimir Fedoseyev, Neeme Järvi, Andris Nelsons, Sebastian Weigle, Kazushi Ōno, Gennady Rozhdestvensky, Marek Janowski and Daniele Gatti.

On November 5, 2019, he was named Chairman of the Board of the Latvian National Opera, but he continues performing internationally as a soloist.

== Awards and honours ==
- 1989: Belvedere Singing Competition
- 1991: International Robert Stolz Singing Competition
- 1991: Francisco Viñas International Singing Contest
- 1992: International competition Chant-de-Paris
- 1992: International Singing Competition of Toulouse
- 1994: Bilbao International Singing Competition
- 1996: Latvian Grand Music Award
- 1996: I Cestelli Competizione dell' Opera
- 2002: Latvian Grand Music Award
- 2007: Order of the Three Stars
- 2013: Latvian Grand Music Award
- 2014: Latvian Grand Music Award
- 2019: Appointed Chairman of the Board of the Latvian National Opera and Ballet.

== Discography ==
- 1998: Samson et Dalila, Erato – with Sir Colin Davis (conductor), José Cura, Olga Borodina, London Symphony Orchestra and Chorus.
- 1998: Der Dämon, Bregenzer Festspiele, ORF – with Marina Mescheriakova, Olga Alexandrova, Pavel Daniluk, Vienna Symphony.
- 2000: Greek Passion, Bregenzer Festspiele, ORF – with Ulf Schirmer (conductor), Christopher Ventris, John Daszak, Robert Wörle, Adrian Clarke, Vienna Symphony.
- 2001: Rinaldo, DVD, Sony, – with Harry Bicket (conductor), David Alden (director), David Daniels, Deborah York, Noëmi Nadelmann, David Walker, Axel Köhler, Bavarian State Orchestra.
- 2008: Aleko, Relief – with Vladimir Fedoseyev (conductor), Maria Gavrilova, Alexandra Dursuneva, Andrey Dunayev, Vyacheslav Pochapsky.
- 2011: Schubert und Strauss Lieder – with Helmut Deutsch (piano).
- 2013: Richard Wagner in der Schweiz, Sony – David Zinman (conductor), Tonhalle-Orchester Zürich.
- 2019: Latvian Songs, Skani – with Maris Skuja (piano).
- 2019: Lohengrin, Bayreuther Festspiele, Deutsche Grammophon – with Georg Zeppenfeld, Piotr Beczała, Anja Harteros, Tomasz Konieczny, Waltraud Meier.
