= Vocalise (disambiguation) =

A vocalise is a vocal work or an exercise without words.

Vocalise may also refer to:

- Vocalise (Corigliano), a 1999 orchestral composition by John Corigliano
- "Vocalise" (Rachmaninoff), a 1915 song by Sergei Rachmaninoff
- Vocalises (Ivanovs), a cycle of fourteen pieces for mixed choir a capella composed between 1964 and 1982 by Jānis Ivanovs
- Adiemus V: Vocalise, a 2003 album by Karl Jenkins

== See also ==
- Vocalese
- Vocalisation (disambiguation)
