= Emīls Dārziņš =

Latvian composer, conductor and music critic

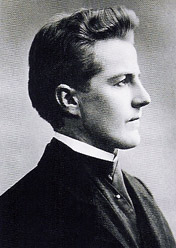
- Born: November 3, 1875; Jaunpiebalga, Russian Empire
- Died: August 31, 1910 (aged 34); Rīga, Russian Empire
- Known for: music
- Notable work: Melancholic waltz
- Movement: Romanticism

Emīls Dārziņš (November 3, 1875 – August 31, 1910) was a Latvian composer, conductor and music critic. Dārziņš' work bears a distinct romantic character, with a strong trend towards national themes. His main musical authorities and influences were Pyotr Tchaikovsky and Jean Sibelius. Dārziņš musical contribution is mainly to vocal music (choral and art songs), but he also composed orchestral music, though only one piece, Melanholiskais valsis (Melancholic waltz) has survived. His only opera, Rožainās dienas (Rosy days), remained unfinished after his early death at the age of 34.

== Biography ==
Dārziņš was born on November 3, 1875, in a rural teacher's family. Both his parents were very musical and facilitated Emīls's first musical education. His father, being an amateur musician and conductor of a local choir, taught his son to play the piano. Dārziņš's attachment to music became stronger after he almost lost his eyesight at the age of 3, as a result of overstraining it while reading. He was also diagnosed allergic to sunlight, so for 5 years he was living in a completely dark room. He could go back to normal life when he was eight. Since then, he also was going to school.

Dārziņš spent his childhood in the country and attended various local schools. During those years he became familiar with the music of Beethoven and Mozart. At the age of 16 Dārziņš moved to Riga, where he continued his studies in music and composed his first choral piece Jūs, kalni, jūs, lejas (You, mountains, you, lowlands). This song received favourable mention from the well-known Latvian composer, Jāzeps Vītols, who had been a pupil of Rimsky-Korsakov. Dārziņš's attendance at the 4th Latvian Song Festival in Jelgava finally strengthened his determination to become a musician.

In 1897, Dārziņš began study at the Moscow Conservatory, but was forced to leave because of an abrupt sickness. He finally entered St Petersburg Conservatory, in the organ class. Due to financial hardship Dārziņš was forced to give music lessons, yet that was not enough to cover his living expenses. In spring 1901, not having finished his studies, Dārziņš returned to Riga where he started to work as a music critic, teacher and choir conductor. "To work for my nation and its art - that will be my motto!" - he wrote in one letter at that time.

In November 1903, Dārziņš married Marija Deidere, but the marriage was not a happy one, partially due to endless material difficulties, but also due to the composer's growing addiction to alcohol. The latter was apparently exacerbated by the especially hostile attitude that other Latvian musicians seemed to display towards him. In 1906 their son Volfgangs was born; their daughter Tatiana was born in 1908.

The Melanholiskais valsis was composed in 1904 and was premiered in late 1905 at Jurmala.

In the beginning of 1908, two orchestral pieces by Dārziņš were performed in Riga, yet these met with fierce negative criticism from other Latvian composers. P. Jurjāns called him "a dilettante and a boasting critic" and even accused him of plagiarism. Dārziņš objected and asked for an independent opinion of an authoritative professor Alexander Glazunov, who found the criticisms unfounded. Yet Jurjāns had obtained a letter from Sibelius which apparently supported his biting criticism. Having received this strong moral blow, Dārziņš decided to destroy all his orchestral works. The Melanholiskais valsis (Melancholy waltz) was restored after his death.

At the end of the same year, Dārziņš started work on opera Rožainās dienas, which, however, was left unfinished. The composer died on August 31, 1910, in an accident the causes of which are still the subject of controversy; it is believed that he committed suicide by falling under a train.

During his lifetime, he created four symphonies, 17 choral songs and 19 solo songs; he had also started to work on an opera.

== Honours ==
- The Emīls Dārziņš Music School is named after him, as well as several streets throughout the country.
- A five-euro coin commemorates the Melanholiskais valsis.
