= Jānis Kalniņš =

Jānis Kalniņš may refer to:

- Jānis Kalniņš (composer) (1904–2000), Latvian Canadian composer and conductor
- Jānis Kalniņš (ice hockey) (born 1991), Latvian ice hockey goaltender
