= Marģers =

- Gender: Male
- Name day: 21 April

Origin
- Region of origin: Latvia

Marģers is a Latvian masculine given name and may refer to:

- Marģers Skujenieks (1886–1941), Latvian politician, former Prime Minister of Latvia
- Marģers Vestermanis (1925–2026), Latvian Holocaust survivor and historian
- Marģeris Zariņš (1910–1993), Latvian composer and writer
