= Jānis Kalniņš (composer) =

Latvian Canadian composer and conductor

Jānis Kalniņš (3 November 1904 in Pärnu – 30 November 2000 in Fredericton) was a Latvian Canadian composer and conductor.

== Latvia ==
Jānis Kalniņš was the son of composer Alfrēds Kalniņš. He was a student first of Jāzeps Vītols at the Latvian Academy of Music, then of Erich Kleiber, Hermann Abendroth and Leo Blech. His two major operas were Hamlets (1936) and Ugunī (1937). He was chief conductor of the Latvian National Opera 1933–1944.

== Canada ==
Kalniņš emigrated to Canada in 1948, taking a position as an organist in Fredericton, where he worked until retirement in 1991. He was awarded the Order of Vasa by the King of Sweden and the Order of the Three Stars by the State of Latvia, and received a New Brunswick Award for Excellence in the Arts in 1984, among others. Kalnins died in Fredericton in 2000.

== Works ==
- Lolita's Wonder Bird folktale opera (1935)
- Hamlets (Hamlet) Opera (1936)
- New Brunswick Rhapsody (1967)
- New Brunswick Song Cycle (1984)
- Requiem (1991)

== Selected recordings ==
- New Brunswick Rhapsody Symphony Orchestra of the National Latvian Opera. Ave Sol BAF 9611, 1996.
- "Potter's Field" - choral symphony on Biblical texts in Latvian. Jānis Sproģis (Tenor) with the Latvian National Symphony Orchestra, conductor Andrejs Jansons (also Alfrēds Kalniņš "The Sea" cantata Latvian National Opera Orchestra) Latvian Concert 2004
- Hamlet. Opera studio "Figaro" of Jāzeps Vītols Latvian Academy of Music. Performance in the Castle ruins of Bauska on 16 July 2004.
