= Aleksandrs Viļumanis =

Latvian conductor

Aleksandrs Viļumanis (30 August 1942, Preiļi, Reichskommissariat Ostland) is a Latvian conductor.

== Training and career ==
Vilumanis studied percussion and conducting at the Latvian Academy of Music, being hired 1962 as a percussionist and conductor's assistant at the Latvian National Opera. His musical career has been based at the Latvian National Opera, first as intern 1962–69, conductor 1970–72, principal conductor 1975–89 and 1994–96, alternating with the Mariinsky Opera and Ballet Theatre; intern conductor 1972–75 and principal conductor 1990–94. He is currently guest conductor at the Latvian National Opera, Mariinsky Theatre and Bolshoi Theatre.

== Selected Recordings ==
LP/CD

- Alfrēds Kalniņš Banuta - Latvia's national opera
- Inessa Galante Debut 1995

VHS/DVD

- Prokofiev's The Stone Flower Kirov Ballet NVC DVD
- Delibes's Coppelia Kirov Ballet NVC - Grammophon
