= Paula Liniņa =

Latvian footballer

Paula Linda Liniņa
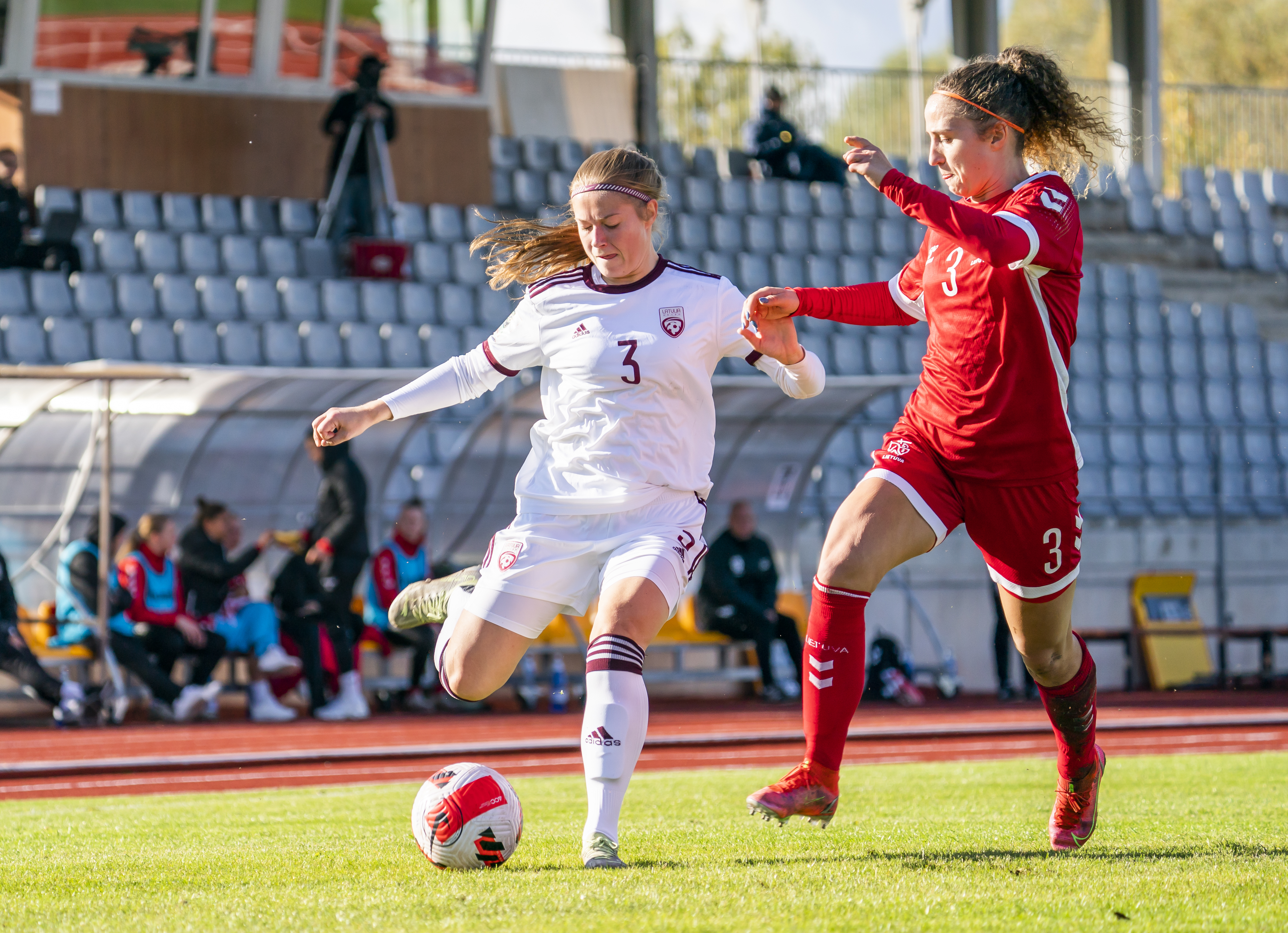

Personal information
- Date of birth: 6 May 2001 (age 25)
- Place of birth: Preiļi
- Position: Defender

Team information
- Current team: FS Metta (women)

Youth career
- 2011-2018: Preiļu BJSS

Senior career*
Years	Team	Apps	(Gls)
2018-2020	BFC Daugavpils		
2018-2020	FS Metta (women)		

International career^{‡}
2015	Latvia U-15	2	(0)
2015-2017	Latvia U-17	20	(1)
2018-2019	Latvia U-19	13	(2)
2018–	Latvia	30	(0)
- * Club domestic league appearances and goals as of 12:44 16 July 2024 (UTC) ‡ National team caps and goals as of 19:01 8 April 2025 (UTC)

Paula Linda Liniņa (born 6 May 2001) is a Latvian footballer who plays as a forward for FS Metta (women) and the Latvia national team. Paula Linda Liniņa was awarded the title of Latvia's Youth Footballer of the Year in 2019.

== Career ==
Liniņa made her debut for the Latvia national team on 28 February 2018, coming on as a substitute for Kristīne Giržda against Mexico.
