= Irma Jaunzem =

Latvian-Belarusian mezzosoprano folk song specialist

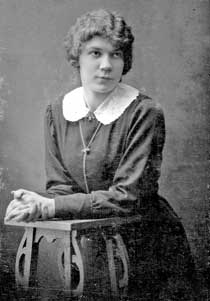
Irma Jaunzem

Irma Jaunzem, also Jaunzeme (1897–1975) was a Latvian-Belarusian mezzo-soprano singer and educator. Initially performing with small ensembles, she soon began to specialize in Belarusian folk songs which she collected from her travels to villages throughout the country. She subsequently extended her research to the four corners of the Soviet Union. From the late 1920s until 1967, she performed as a soloist with the Moscow Philharmonic Society.

== Biography ==
Born on 27 September 1897 in Minsk, Irma Petrovna Jaunzem was the daughter of Pēteris Jaunzems (also Pyotr Jaunsem) and Evelina Martynovna who were both Latvians. After matriculating from high school, she studied at the Saint Petersburg Conservatory under the soprano Xenia Dorliak. She was also assisted by the Lavian composer Jāzeps Vītols when he became aware of her Latvian origins. He introduced her to the Latvian community's choral association which inspired her interest in Latvian folk music.

She apparently did not complete her studies at the Conservatory. In 1917, she returned to Minsk for the summer holidays but as a result of the commotion caused by the Russian Revolution, she was forced to earn a living by working with small musical groups performing in provincial theatres. After the hostilities ceased, she performed with two budding young musicians, the pianist Vladimir Horowitz and the violinist Nathan Milstein. It was then she embarked on visits to Belarusian villages where she discovered a wealth of folk songs, one of which was the popular Песня пастуха (The Song of the Shepherd). Thanks to her discoveries, she included Belarusian folk songs in her performances in the country's most prominent theatres, gaining the support of the Belarusian authorities and becoming a soloist with the Moscow Philharmonic Society in 1925.

From the mid-1920s, Jaunzem toured more widely, performing in China, Korea and Japan as well as in the 1927 World Music Exhibition in Frankfurt. In the 1930s, encouraged by the Academy of Sciences work in Leningrad in support of folklore research, she undertook tours of Central Asia, documenting the local folk songs. Her repertoire ultimately included several thousand folk songs. During the Second World War, she performed for troops on the front. In the 1950s, she began work as an educator in the All Russian Variety Workshop and the Ippolitov-Ivanov School.

Irma Jaunzem died on 17 April 1975 and is buried in Moscow.

== Awards ==
In 1957, Jaunzem was awarded the People’s Artist of the RSFSR and in 1967 the Order of the Red Banner of Labour.
