= Jēgers =

Jēgers is a surname. Notable people with the surname include:

- Alfons Jēgers (1919–1998), Latvian football and hockey player
- Sergejs Jēgers (born 1979), Latvian countertenor
