= Sergejs Jēgers =

Latvian countertenor (born 1979)

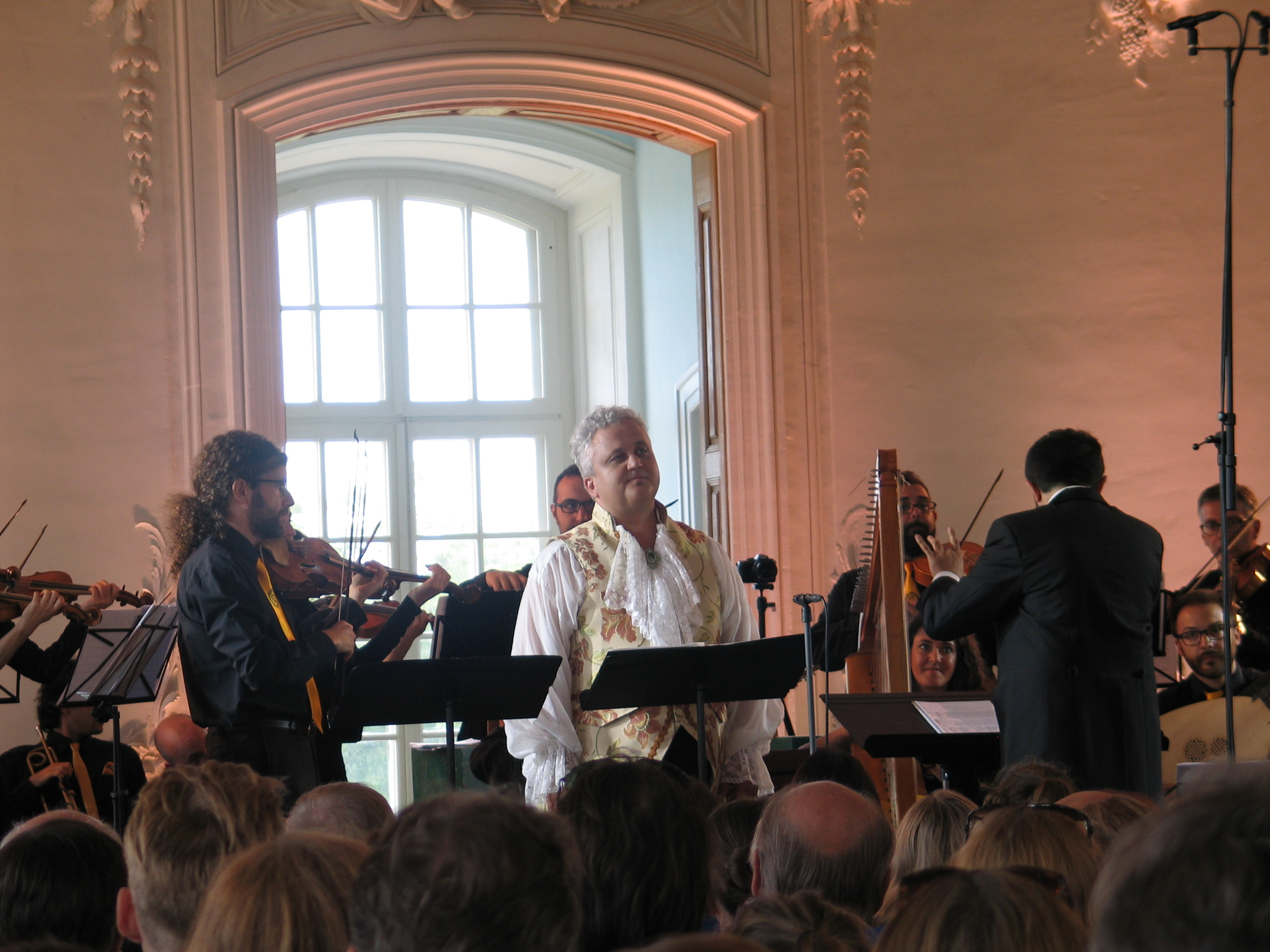
- Sergejs Jēgers in the White Hall of Rundāle Palace
- Born: 28 January 1979 (age 46); Jelgava, Latvia
- Education: Latvian Academy of Music; Schola Cantorum Basiliensis
- Occupations: Countertenor; Academic voice teacher
- Years active: 2000–present
- Website: www.sergejsjegers.lv

Sergejs Jēgers (born 28 January 1979) is a Latvian countertenor.

== Biography ==
Jēgers was born in Jelgava, Latvia and spent his childhood in Vilce. He attended Riga Music Boarding School and the Latvian Academy of Music, where he obtained a bachelor's degree in 2003 and a master's degree after studying with Kārlis Zariņš in 2005 and later 3 years with professor Andris Veismanis. He also studied at the Schola Cantorum Basiliensis in Switzerland with Andreas Scholl.

== Career ==
In 2003, he made his debut with the Latvian National Opera in Anton Rubinstein's opera, The Demon. He has performed across the world in many operas and orchestral works such as Handel's Messiah, Vivaldi's Gloria and Pergolesi's Stabat Mater. In 2005, he won 6th place out of the 25 finalists in the BBC Cardiff Singer of the World competition.

== Discography ==
- Ave Musica (2006) with Latvian Baroque Orchestra - UPE CD015
- G.F. Hendelis - Mesija (2006) recorded at St. Saviour's Church in Riga
- Schola Cantorum Riga - Illumina (2007) with Artis Gāga (saxophone)
- Duende (2007) with Artis Gāga (saxophone)
- Stabat Mater (2007) with Inese Galante (soprano)
- Dziesmiņās remdējos (2009) Latvian folk songs arranged by Raimonds Tiguls
- Reiz sensenos laikos (2010) Hans Christian Andersen Fairy Tales
- Ave Maria (2011) with Diāna Jaunzeme (organ) - LK 006
- Music in Riga 1570-1800 (2012) with Baroque orchestra Collegium Musicum Riga
