= Preiļi =

Town and capital of Preiļi Municipality, Latvia

- Town
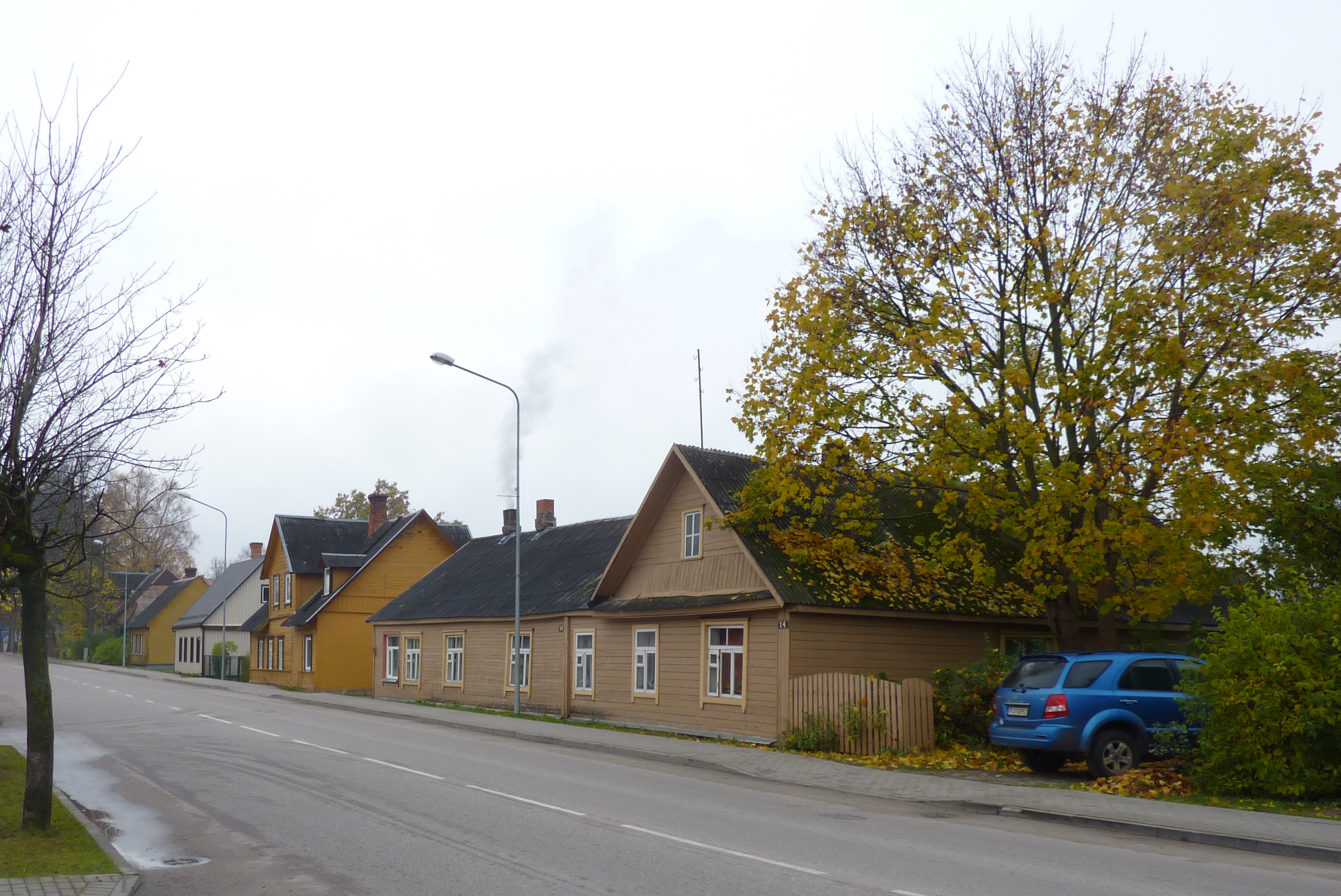
- Daugavpils Street in Preiļi

- Flag Coat of arms

- Location in Latvia
- Coordinates: 56°18′N 26°43′E
- Country: Latvia
- Municipality: Preiļi Municipality
- Town rights: 1928

Government
  - Mayor: Ārijs Vucāns

Area
  - Total: 5.91 km^{2} (2.28 sq mi)
  - Land: 5.71 km^{2} (2.20 sq mi)
  - Water: 0.2 km^{2} (0.077 sq mi)

Population (2026)
  - Total: 5,724
  - Density: 1,000/km^{2} (2,600/sq mi)
- Time zone: UTC+2 (EET)
  - Summer (DST): UTC+3 (EEST)
- Postal code: LV-5301
- Calling code: +371 653
- Number of city council members: 11
- Website: http://www.preili.lv/

Preiļi (Polish: Prele; German: Prely; Russian: Прейли, previously also Прели) is a town and the administrative centre of Preiļi Municipality in the Latgale region of Latvia.

== History ==
Preiļi is one of the oldest settlements in Latvia. It was first mentioned in written sources in 1250. The Borch family manor was erected in 1836.

By 1897, Preiļi had a population of 2104. Preiļi has had city rights since 1928. By 1935, there were 1662 people living in Preiļi of whom 50.97% were Jews. After World War II, there were less than 1000 people living in Preiļi. During the Soviet era, many workers from Russia and Belarus started working in Preiļi and the population reached a peak of 9421 in 1989.

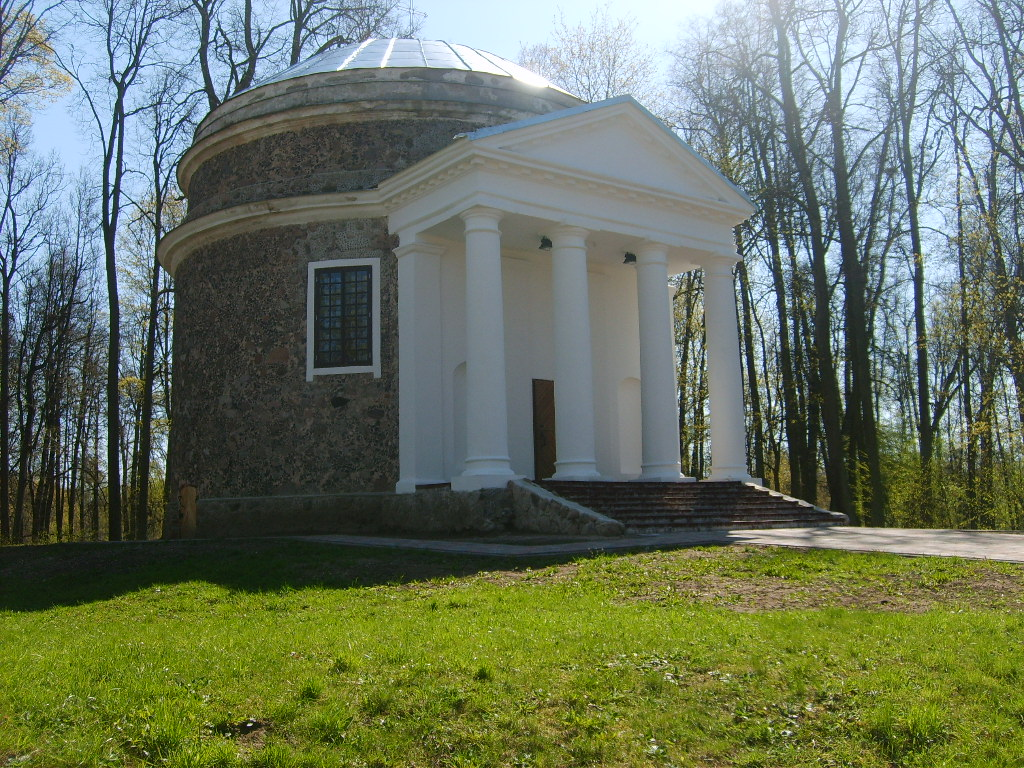
Mortuary of von Borch family in city park

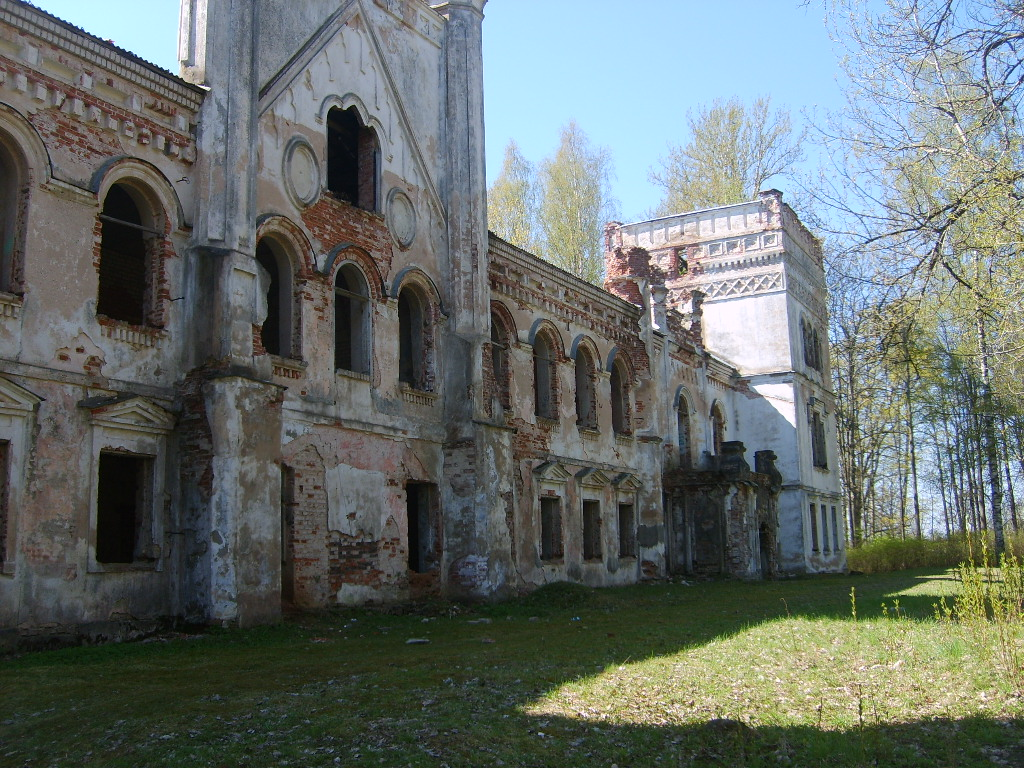
Ruins of Preiļi Palace

== Demographics ==
Demographics of Preiļi
Latvians	54.4%
Russians	39.6%
Poles	1.9%
Belarusians	1.5%
Roma	1.2%

== Notable people ==
- Jānis Ivanovs (1906-1983), classical music composer
- Jānis Streičs (1936 – 2026), film director and artist.
- Aleksandrs Viļumanis (born 1942), classical music conductor
- Antonija Vilcāne (born 1956), medieval archaeologist

=== Sport ===
- Ilga Bērtulsone (born 1966), women's discus thrower, competed at the 1992 Summer Olympics
- Vladislavs Agurjanovs (born 1989), table tennis player

== Twin towns — sister cities ==
Preiļi is twinned with:

- Hlybokaye, Belarus
- Nizhyn, Ukraine
- Ocnița, Moldova
- Sahil, Azerbaijan
- Utena, Lithuania

== See also ==
- List of cities in Latvia
