= Antonija Vilcāne =

Latvian archaeologist

- Born: 1956 (age 69–70)
- Occupation: Medieval archaeologist
- Known for: Excavation of Jersika hillfort

Academic background
- Thesis: The settlement of the Dubna basin and the formation of Latgalian culture during the Iron Age (1st–12th centuries) (2001)

Antonija Vilcāne (born 1956) is a medieval archaeologist from Latvia, who specialises in the study of Latgalian culture. First excavated in 1939 by Francis Balodis (lv) and Elvīra Šņore (lv), Vilcāne succeeded Evalds Mugurēvičs (lv) as the archaeologist leading excavation at Jersika hillfort (lv). She has also led excavations at Anspoku and Drusku (lv) hillforts, at Turaida Museum Reserve, in the cemetery near the Preiļi manor chapel, amongst others. She is an expert on the archaeology of whips and their handles, which are a particular feature of medieval Latvian material culture.

Born in Preiļi, she led an exhibition to archaeologist Francis Zagorskis (lv), who worked there. Finds from the burial site of Bučki, which she also excavated, are displayed at Preiļi Museum of History and Applied Arts. She studied at the University of Latvia; her PhD dissertation, which was awarded in 2001, was entitled "Dubnas baseina apdzīvotība un latgaļu kultūras veidošanās dzelzs laikmetā (1.–12. gs.)" ["The settlement of the Dubna basin and the formation of Latgalian culture during the Iron Age (1st–12th centuries)].

== Selected works ==
- Pētersone-Gordina, Elīna, et al. "Diet and social status in the Lejasbitēni Iron Age population from Latvia." Journal of Archaeological Science: Reports 44 (2022): 103519.
- Kimsis, Janis, et al. "Application of natural sciences methodology in archaeological study of Iron Age burials in Latvia: pilot study." Forensic Science, Medicine and Pathology (2022): 1-8.
- Vilcāne, Antonija. "Tenth to 11th century warrior burials with horse-trappings in the Latgallian area." Archaeologia Baltica 8 (2007): 273-282.
