= Vladislavs Agurjanovs =

Latvian professional table tennis player

Personal information
- Full name: Vladislavs Agurjanovs
- Born: December 3, 1989 (age 36) Preiļi, Latvia
- Height: 1.86 m (6 ft 1 in)
- Weight: 75 kg (165 lb)

Sport
- Sport: Table tennis
- Highest ranking: 782

Vladislavs Agurjanovs (born December 3, 1989) is a Latvian professional table tennis player. He is ranked Latvian No.2. He is left-handed.

== Early life ==
Vladislavs Agurjanovs was born in a small Latvian town Preiļi to Elena Agurjanova and Viktors Agurjanovs. He started playing table tennis at 6. At the young age, people have seen his talents and his first coach Anatolijs Isajevs knew that he will become good player.

== Career ==
Vladislavs started to play in local tournaments at age of 7 and his first win came 3 months later. After that his career started to go up quickly. He went national and even international tournaments. By the age of 10 he had many wins and was high in the ranking for his age. At the age 13 he moved to Latvian federation based club in Liepāja, there his technique became way better. He was already winning medals at Latvian Cadet Championship, also was playing for Latvia in the European Championship. At the age of 16 his talent was discovered by the German table tennis team Illeburger TTC Sachsen Döbeln, with whom he signed a contract very soon. Since then he went to European Junior Championship and went to many international championships. His first appearance in the Senior European Championship came in 2009. Where he with Latvian national team came 27. and in the singles in the first round he beat Simon Oehri from Liechtenstein and in the second round lost to European number 1. and number 3 in world Timo Boll. In overall his performance was good enough, but he himself said "I wasn't happy with my performance in the first few games at all, I was playing very bad. All I tried didn't work properly. But in the last few games, my game became way better. I started to produce something good. But in overall it wasn't my best championship and I can do way better than that. I hope next year will be better" Currently Vladislavs continues to play in the German team. Vladislavs achieved his highest world ranking in the October 2009, after his first major European Championship, he currently is no. 787 in the world and no. 4 in Latvia On 17 December he left Illeburger TTC due to clubs hard financial situation.
In summer 2013 he switched from VfL Schwerin to TTG 207 Ahrensburg/Großhansdorf (near Hamburg) to play in the German Regionalliga for the next season.
