= Vocalization =

Vocalization or vocalisation may refer to:

- Speech, communication using the human voice
  - Vocable, an utterance that is not considered a word
  - Speech production, the processes by which spoken sounds are made
- Animal communication, the transfer of information from one or a group of animals to another
  - Amphibian vocalization
  - Bird vocalization, bird calls and bird songs
  - Dolphin vocalizations
  - Female copulatory vocalizations, produced by females while mating
- Voice (phonetics), the vibration of the vocal cords that accompanies some speech sounds
  - Consonant voicing and devoicing, the addition or removal of this vibration from consonant sounds
- Vocalization, the change of a sound into a vowel
  - L-vocalization, the change of the consonant [l] into a vowel or semivowel
- Vocal music, music performed by singers with or without instrumental accompaniment
- Non-lexical vocalization in music
- Speech disfluency, an utterance that interrupts the normal flow of speech

== Writing ==
- Vocalization of consonantal text, the adding of vowels to a text written in consonants only
  - Arabic diacritics, symbols added to Arabic letters to represent vowels and consonant length
  - Niqqud, a system of diacritics to indicate vowel quality in Hebrew
    - Babylonian vocalization, a system of niqqud devised by the Masoretes of Babylon; defunct
    - Palestinian vocalization, a system of niqqud devised by the Masoretes of Jerusalem; defunct
    - Tiberian vocalization, a system of niqqud devised by the Masoretes of Tiberias; still in use

== See also ==
- Vocalise (disambiguation)
