= Preiļi Palace =

Palace in Latvia

- Preiļi, Latgale, Latvia
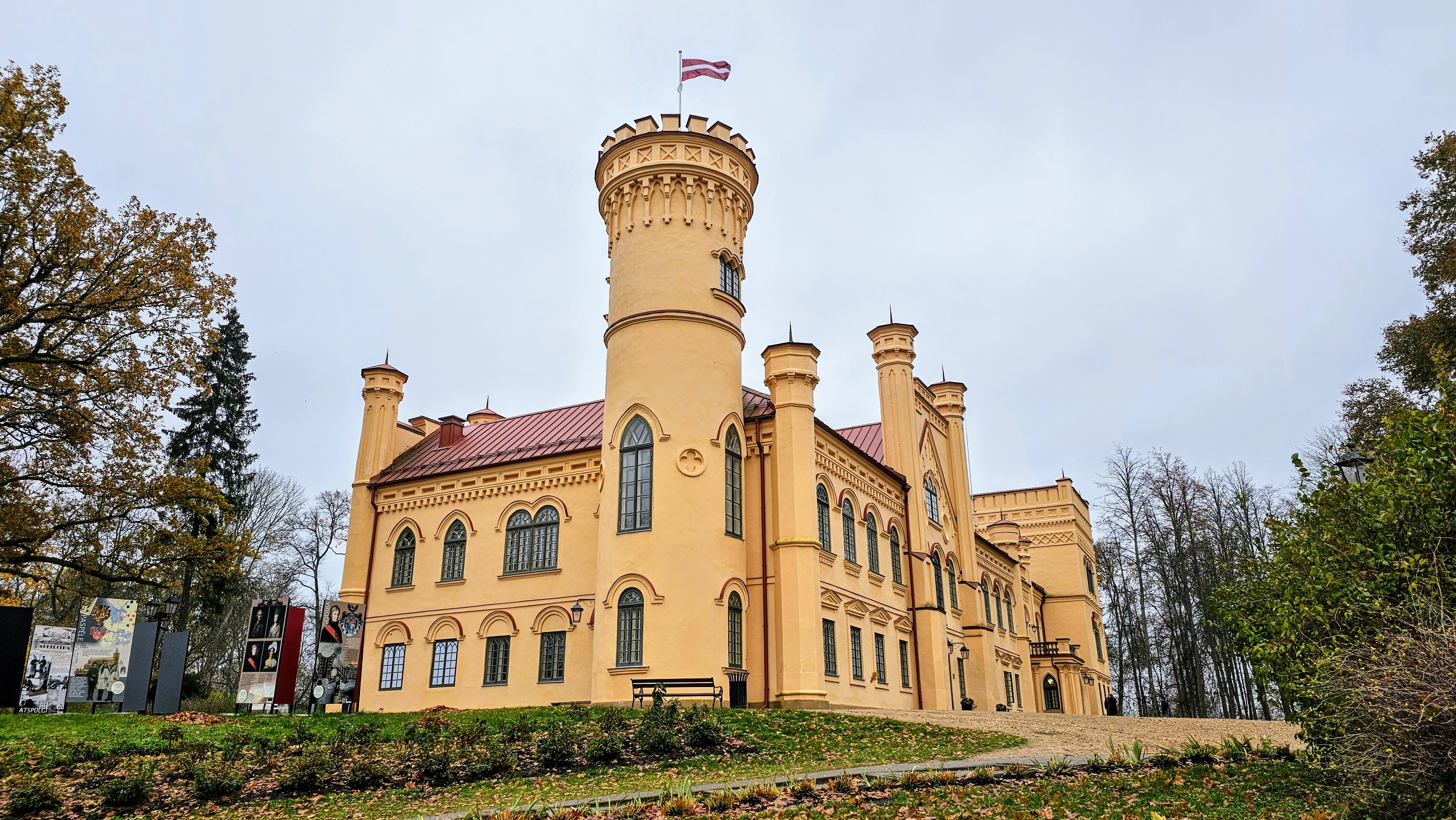

Site information
- Type: Palace
- Condition: Exterior restored, Interior restoration in progress.

Location
- Coordinates: 56.286644°N 26.728964°E

Preiļi Palace (Latvian: Preiļu pils, Polish: Pałac w Prelach) is a palace near the town of Preiļi in the historical region of Latgale, in eastern Latvia. Originally built in the early 19th century, the structure was converted between 1860 and 1865 into its present English Neo-Gothic form, also called Tudor style. The interior was destroyed in a February 1978 fire. In 2017, restoration of the Preiļi Palace started, it is planned to place the exposition of the Preiļi History and Applied Art Museum there.

== History ==
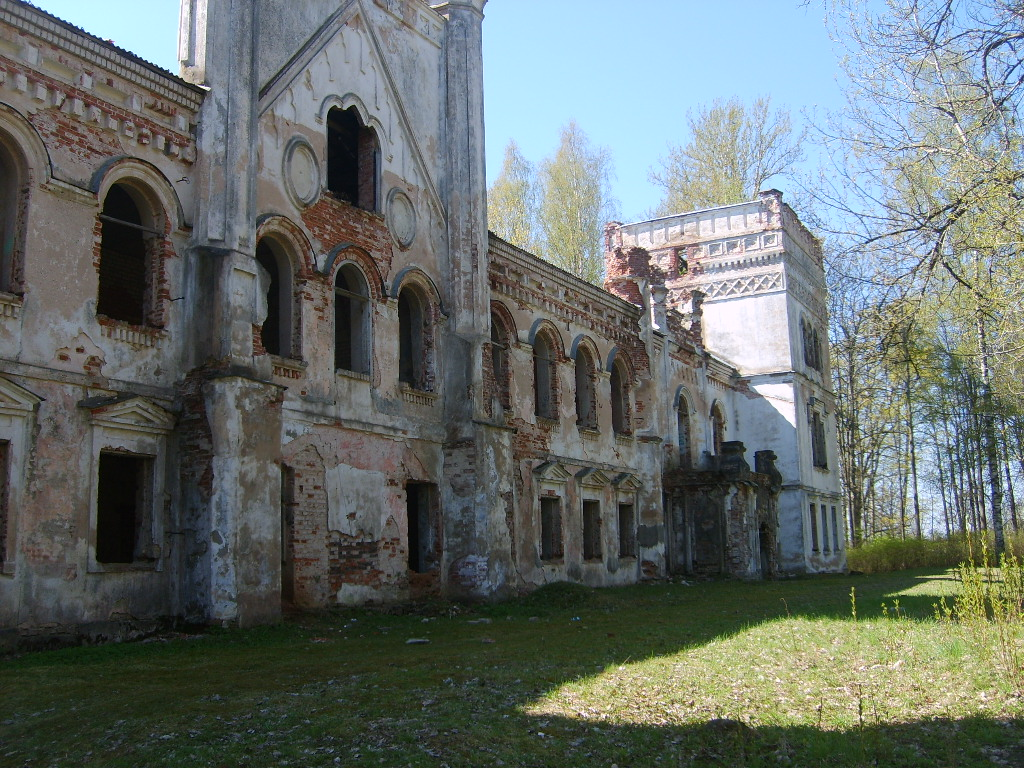
Preiļi Palace before the start of renovation work in 2007

The estate initially contained a castle of the Livonian order, The Count Borhs (German: von der Borch) family was the owner of the property from 1382 to 1864, which was devastated by Russian tsar Ivan the terrible at the time of the Russian invasion in the second half of the 16th century, during the Livonian War. The castle was not reconstructed though. Instead, a new palace was built, which was set on fire at the beginning of the 18th century.

A two-storied Neo-Gothic palace was erected on the site in about 1836, according to the architectural project of architects A. Beleckis and G. Schacht. Later, the building was remodelled and a round castle-type turret located at the northeast side was added to the structure. The construction was initiated at the beginning of the 19th century and finished during the 1860s. The third story with a wooden construction for a campanile was built between 1891 and 1910. In February 1978, the palace was burnt down again and for many years remained without a roof.

The Preiļi landscape park covers 41,2 hectares, of which 13,2 are covered by ponds. Some architectural monuments in the park, such as a chapel, stables, the palace itself and the park's main cottage, may be visited. The Preiļi History and Applied Art Museum, opened in 1985, is also part of the Preiļi estate. The museum collection comprises mainly historical items, besides more than 10,000 items created by local and foreign artists.

== Timeline of proprietors at Preiļi ==
- 1866–1873 – The palace ownership was acquired by the English merchant Johann Heinrich Fredrick.
- 1873–1891 – Owned by Johann Ungern-Sternberg, and after that it was transferred to Jan Mols.
- 1891–1910 – Transferred to the Russian Tsar’s chamberlain Konstantin Gulkevich.
- 1910–1919 – Kārlis Hipiuss acquired the property.
- 1924–1944 – Preiļi Agricultural School controlled the property and the School of Agriculture and Housekeeping took it from 1939.
- 1945–1963 – Preiļi Secondary School.
- 1963–1978 – Preiļi Children’s Sport School, and subsequently many other local companies and formal entities.

== See also ==
- List of palaces and manor houses in Latvia
