= Lauma Reinholde =

Lauma Reinholde (1906 - 1986) was a Latvian composer, pianist and teacher who toured internationally and composed over 300 works. Although sometimes known as Lauma Vikmane after her marriage, she is best known as Lauma Reinholde.

Reinholde was born in Riga to a musical family. Her mother Alvine Rozenberga was a pianist. Her father Janis Reinholde was a composer, conductor, and violinist.

Reinholde began studying piano at age three and attended the Riga Conservatory (today the Jāzeps Vītols Latvian Academy of Music) and the St. Petersburg Conservatory. Her teachers included A. Daugulis, E. Daugovet, and Jāzeps Vītols.

After graduating in 1926, Reinholde studied abroad. Describing this time in an autobiographical article (On the Path of My Life. Zeltene, No. 3, 01.02.1934), she noted, "Although I wanted to go abroad to improve my skills immediately after graduating from the conservatory, I only managed to do so after two years, as I could not find the funds sooner. With a grant from the cultural fund and a part of my own savings, I set out into the world. I had to endure many indescribably difficult days during these times of studying abroad (in Germany and Poland). I often ran out of funds, and it was not uncommon for me to spend four days in a row without a bite to eat."

In 1936, Reinholde married the teacher and musician Elmars Verners Vikmanis. She taught piano and music theory, and served as a pianist with the Riga Philharmonic Orchestra and the opera, presenting piano recitals in Finland, Poland and Sweden. She often performed with the singer Helēna Kozlovska-Ersa.

Musicologist Oļģerts Grāvītis described Reinholde as "an experienced composer of vocal music", noting that "she is excellent at using the possibilities of the singer's voice, putting all her skills as a pianist to use, she has created technically richly developed piano accompaniments for the song, underlining the subtexts of the content. In many of her vocal compositions, the best traditions of the school of Professor Jāzeps Vītols are felt. I would like to add that in the early period of Lauma Reinholde's independent creative work, a strong temperament, great emotional excitement, and good musical taste are characteristic."

Reinholde's compositions include:

== Ballet ==
- Marite (for children)
- Sarmite
- Ziemelmeita

== Chamber ==
- Ballade (cello and piano)
- Lesa (clarinet and oboe)
- Scherzo (flute and piano)
- Sonata (cello and piano)

== Opera ==
- Krauklitis
- Voronenok (libretto by Rainis)

== Orchestra ==
- Gory
- Legend (bassoon and orchestra)

== Piano ==
- Preludes
- Scherzo
- Sonata
- Two Latgalian Rhapsodies
- Variations

== Theater ==
- Tomeliu Mates Vayas Dienas (musical comedy)
- Zelta Zirgs (play by Rainis)

== Vocal ==
- Arrangements of Latvian folk songs
- Ave Sil (three voices; text by Rainis)
- Ballada (bass and orchestra)
- Eight Duets
- "Gaviles" (text by Peteris Kikuts)
- "Menesslaiva" (text by Rainis)
- "Menestins Meloja" (text by Aspazija)
- "Nac" (text by Biruta Skujeniece)
- Pesnya Novogo Rozhdenia Freniksov (cantata)
- Songs and romances on texts by Mikhail Lermontov and Vladimir Mayakovsky
