= Armands Melnbārdis =

Latvian violinist

Armand Melnbardis
- Birth name: Armands Melnbārdis
- Born: Riga, Latvia
- Genres: Heavy metal, hard rock, classical, crossover, jazz
- Occupation: Multi-instrumentalist & Designer of the Vio7
- Instrument(s): Violin, piano, keyboards, guitar
- Years active: 1992-present

Armands Melnbārdis is a Latvian-born musician and recording artist.

== Early life ==
Melnbārdis was born and raised in Riga, Latvia by his mother Helga Ingeborga Melnbārde, herself an accomplished artist and author. His violin studies began at the young age of five at Emīls Dārziņš Music School Conservatory of Music, in Riga, (Latvian: Emīla Dārziņa mūzikas vidusskola). Armand began touring internationally at the age of twelve. In 1992 after one of his solo performances in the famous Wagner Hall in Riga, he was offered to continue his education at Stetson University with world renown classical violinist Dr. Alvaro Gomez, where upon his arrival he became the concertmaster of Stetson Symphony. Melnbārdis toured throughout Europe and the USA since the early age of twelve, performing in Germany, France, Finland, Russia, United Kingdom, Wales, Scotland, Estonia, Lithuania, and Latvia.

== Musical education ==
- Bachelor of Music, Stetson University, DeLand FL
- Rollins College · Master of Music Education · Music Education · Winter Park, Florida
- Emīls Dārziņš Music School Conservatory of Music, Riga, Latvia

== Career ==
- Melnbārdi has performed or recorded with the following artists:
- Luciano Pavarotti
- Barry Manilow
- Richard Marx
- Dino
- Rob Rock
- Richard Hayman
- Carman
- Nova Era
- Debbie Gibson
- Ray Price
- Kelle Rhoads
- N'Sync
- Acoustic Saints
- Beu Sisters
- Heaven & Earth
- He has performed with a number of Orchestras, in the US and Latvia:
- Orlando Bach Festival Symphony
- Orlando Symphony
- Ft. Myers Symphony
- Ft Lauderdale Opera House Orchestra
- Brevard Symphony Orchestra
- Daytona Beach Symphony & Guild
- Ormond Beach Symphony
- Space Coast Pops Symphony
- Florida Lakes Symphony
- Seaside Music Theatre Orchestra
- National Opera Symphony of Latvia
- Melnbārdi has held the position of concertmaster with the United European International Orchestra Summit Cognac, France; and with the Stetson Symphony Orchestra, the Symphony Beach Club Ormond Beach Orchestra, and the Stetson Chamber Orchestra, all in DeLand, Florida.
- Ormond Beach Symphony, and the Stetson University Orchestra have featured him as soloist.
- He has been first violinist with the Vio7 String Quartet, the Barron String Quartet, and the Ormond String Quartet.

=== Television Performances ===
- "ARMAND Live From New York City" (TBN)
- "ARMAND & ROB ROCK Christmas Special" (#1) (TBN)
- "ARMAND & ROB ROCK Christmas Special" (#2) (TBN)
- "Carman Halloween Special" (TBN)
- "Christmas with N'Sync" (MTV, VH1)

=== Studio albums ===
- Vio7 The Seventh String (7-string rock; metal violin)
- Vintage Colours (smooth jazz violin)
- Pure Vanilla Christmas (classical, jazz, Broadway)
- Upon The Christmas Night (jazz, pop, classical, Christian)
- Dig With Heaven and Earth (2013)

== Recognition and awards ==
- A.S.T.A. Young Artist Competition in Miami, Florida
- Stetson University Concerto Competition, DeLand, Florida
- Upcoming Classical Stars Competition, Riga, Latvia
