= Vocalises (Ivanovs) =

1982 choral composition by Jānis Ivanovs

- by Jānis Ivanovs
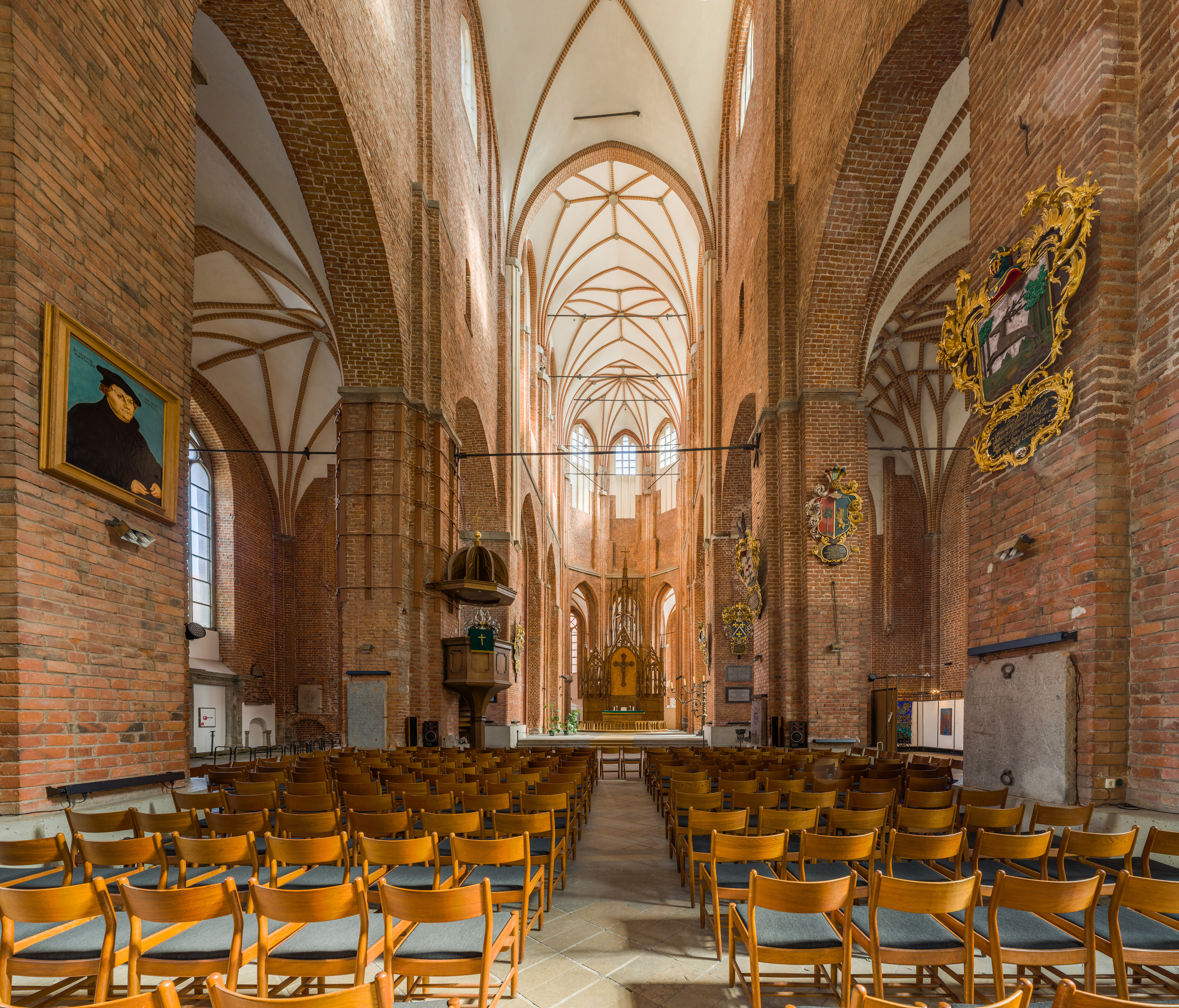
- Interior of St. Peter's Church, Riga, where the world premiere of the complete Vocalises took place in 2003.
- Native name: Vokalīzes
- Composed: 1964–1982
- Publisher: Musica Baltica
- Duration: c. 34 minutes
- Movements: 14
- Scoring: SATB chorus (a capella)

Premiere
- Date: December 13 and 14, 2003 (as an integral cycle)
- Location: St. Peter's Church; Riga, Latvia
- Conductor: Uldis Kokars
- Performers: Ave Sol Chamber Choir

The Vocalises (Latvian: Vokalīzes; Russian: Вокализы, romanized: Vokalizy) are a set of fourteen pieces for SATB chorus a capella by Jānis Ivanovs. The first was "Rudens dziesma" (Autumn Song), composed in 1964. Through the encouragement of Imants Kokars, Ivanovs developed this and subsequent Vocalises into a cycle. The final one was composed in 1982, the year before the composer's death. Individual Vocalises were performed by choirs in Ivanovs' native Latvian SSR, as well as elsewhere in the Soviet Union, where they were received positively. The integral cycle was not performed in public until December 13 and 14, 2003; at the St. Peter's Church in Riga by the Ave Sol Chamber Choir conducted by Uldis Kokars.

== Background ==
The core of the work of Jānis Ivanovs are his symphonies. The relative relaxation of musical censorship in the era of the Khrushchev Thaw permitted Ivanovs to employ musical techniques that had hitherto been discouraged in the Soviet Union. These included polytonality and dodecaphony, which can be heard in his Ninth through Thirteenth symphonies. His music from this period, according to Imants Zemzaris, was at the forefront of the "harsh style" then widespread in Latvian art.

At intervals throughout his career, however, Ivanovs turned his attention away from the symphony to other musical genres, particularly those related to choral music. It was during one of these times that the first of what became the cycle of Vocalises emerged in 1964: "Rudens dziesma" (Autumn Song), a simple work in four-part harmony for SATB chorus a capella. Drawing on the composer's experiences, the work augured his nostalgia-dominated late style, as well as the beginning of musical neoromanticism in Latvia.

Ivanovs first encountered choral music in his childhood, when he was a refugee from World War I. He sang as a boy alto in church choirs first in Vitebsk, then later Smolensk until his voice broke. He learned the choral music of Dmitri Bortnyansky, Pyotr Ilyich Tchaikovsky, and Sergei Rachmaninoff first hand, and drew upon these experiences when composing his Vocalises.

At first, Ivanovs composed each of the Vocalises as self-contained works. Imants Kokars, a Latvian choral conductor who founded the Ave Sol Chamber Choir in 1969, took note of the works, and encouraged the composer to fashion these and subsequent ones into an integral cycle. Ivanovs continued to add movements to his Vocalises until 1982, the year before his death.

Taken as a whole, their tendency towards slower tempi, modality, minor keys, and timbral richness establish the kinship between the various Vocalises. The earlier ones revolve around themes of natural beauty, while the later focus on abstract ideas. A number exist in alternate versions for piano that are included in the Sketches, a late cycle of piano pieces that Ivanovs composed concurrently with the Vocalises.

For the Latvian Radio Choir's 2022 recording of the Vocalises, its choir director Sigvards Kļava included alternate arrangements by Zemzaris of three of its movements. His intention was to "represent Ivanovs' masterpieces in action".

== Music ==
The Vocalises, which is published by Musica Baltica, consists of fourteen individual movements:

1. Rudens dziesma (Autumn Song)
2. Gājputni (Birds of Passage)
3. Lietainā dienā (On a Rainy Day)
4. Gubu mākoņi (Cumulus Clouds)
5. Zīmējums (Drawing)
6. Migla (Mists)
7. Dzimtenes ainava (Homeland Landscape)
8. Varoņu piemiņai (In Memory of Heroes)
9. Prelūdija (Prelude)
10. Cantus Monodicus. Gloria
11. Prelūdija un fūga (Prelude and Fugue)
12. Ziemas rīts (A Winter Morning)
13. Elēģija (Elegy)
14. Jūsma (Delight)

A complete performance of all fourteen movements takes approximately 34 minutes. All are wordless, save for "Cantus Monodicus. Gloria", which concludes with the word "Gloria".

== Reception ==
The world premiere of Ivanovs' Vocalises as an integral cycle occurred on December 13 and 14, 2003; at the St. Peter's Church in Riga. It was sung by the Ave Sol Chamber Choir conducted by Uldis Kokars. The cycle was split in half and performed across the respective days.

Individual movements from the Vocalises had been performed by choirs in Latvia and elsewhere in the Soviet Union, where they were received positively and became incorporated into the choral repertoire. Mārtiņš Boiko said of the works:

The concept of a "feeling for nature" finds its fullest and purest expression in the vocalise genre so characteristic of Jānis Ivanovs. Such musical landscapes ... reveal his extraordinary ability to hear colors and shapes, and to see sounds—an ability that developed in no small measure due to the contribution of musical impressionism, a movement that Ivanovs followed and studied, and which manifested itself to a large extent in his Vocalises, but also in his other works. However, alongside their impressionistic refinement of color and texture, these choral works almost invariably contain a fragile Romantic longing, which finds its expression in the minor tonalities, in the wistful sense of the past, and in the sense of nature as an entity endowed with a soul.

Ludvigs Kārkliņš said that the works "enhanced the glory of Soviet music". In Zemzaris' view, the Vocalises are a manifestation of the Latvian zeitgeist in the 1960s and 1970s, which expressed "a longing for humanity, away from dictatorship, [and] ideological directives".
