= Sarah Feigin =

Latvian music educator and composer (1928–2011)

- שרה פייגין
- Born: 1 July 1928; Riga, Latvia
- Died: 24 April 2011 (aged 82); Holon, Israel
- Occupation(s): composer, musical educator, and pianist

Sarah Feigin (née Kugel; Hebrew: שרה פייגין; 1 July 1928 – 24 April 2011) was a Latvian music educator and composer who lived and worked in Israel.

== Early life ==
Sarah Kugel was born in Latvia, and studied piano and composition at the Jāzeps Vītols Latvian Academy of Music originally known as the Riga Conservatory of Music. She graduated with bachelor's and master's degrees. A Holocaust survivor, she moved to Israel in 1972 and founded a Conservatory of Music in Holon in 1973, working as its director until 1983. Feigin worked for "Jeunesses Musicales d'Israel" from 1973 to 1990, organizing concerts for youth. Her music has been performed internationally.

== Musical achievements ==
Feigin taught children as well as at music education institutions when she lived in Israel. Her preferred instruments were the organ and piano when composing music. Her work has been published by the Israel Music Institute and her pieces have been on the Israeli radio on a regular basis. Feigin composed pieces such as chamber music, music for piano, educational pieces, songs for ballets, and vocal music.

In 2000, Feigin received an award for her work Thoughts On Playing at the International Composition Competition in Miami, Florida.

She has written songs for the piano that involve four hands and up to six hands at once. Some pieces include:

- Shoshana, for piano 6 hands
  - Composed in 1995
- Tumbalalaika, for piano 4 hands
  - Composed in 1995
- Yism'chu Hashamayim, for piano 4 hands
  - Composed in 1996
- Four Hits, arr. for piano 4 hands
  - Composed in 2001

On 9 October 2012, an album called Clarinet Repertoire Of Women Composers was released, and the last song is the Fantasia for Clarinet and Piano by Sarah Feigin – Written in 1996, in Israel.

In 2018, the album "Piano Works by Sara Feigin" was released. The recording focuses on her solo piano music and mostly includes either unperformed or previously unrecorded works, many based on traditional folk songs. The pieces are performed by British-born and Israeli-based pianist Benjamin Goodman.

== Personal life ==
Sarah's birth name was Sarah Kugel, which changed when she married Oscar Feigin, a professor of polymer chemistry. Sarah gave birth to Ilana and Carmela, leaving Latvia in 1972 to help her family emigrate to Israel. This gave her a new sense of creativity, which led to some of her compositions to have certain elements of Israeli folk music. She died in Holon, Israel, on 24 April 2011, of a serious illness.

== Works ==
She has published arrangements of Israeli songs and progressive pedagogical studies. Selected works and their years composed include:

- Autumn Song, for alto-saxophone & piano – 2003
- Awakening, for 2 clarinets and Piano – 2005
- Balayla al Hadashe (At night on the grass) arr. For piano 4 hands – 2001
- Beauty of Songs, for voice & piano – 1997
- Bei mir bis du shein arr. For piano 4 hands – 2001
- Besame Mucho (Kiss me again) arr. For piano 4 hands – 2001
- Caravan, for flute, clarinet & piano – 1995
- Concerto for Clarinet & String Orchestra – 2001
- Elegie in Memoriam Yitzhak Rabin, for piano trio – 1995
- Fantasia for Clarinet & Piano – 1996
- Fantasia for Clarinet and String Quartet – 2009
- String Quartet, Solo instrument + ensemble
- Fantasia for Flute & Harp – 2005
- Fantasia For Two Clarinets & Piano – 1999
- Festive Songs For Piano, Book III, solo piano – 1989
- Four Hits, arr. for piano 4-hands, solo piano – 2001
- Four Scenes, for piano – 1992
- Humoresque and Habanera, for violin and piano – 1991
- In The Name Of..., for voice & piano – 2001
- Kaleidoscope, for orchestra – 2002
- Kyle-Yana, for alto-saxophone & piano – 2002
- Listen, symphonic poem, for solo voice & symphony orchestra – 1973
- Lugubre, for cello & piano – 1995
- Nigunim, for clarinet & piano – 1998
- Playing Together, Songs for Piano 4 hand – 2002
- Prayer for violin and piano – 1987
- Reflections on a Niggun for clarinet and piano – 1999
- Reflections on a Niggun for violin and piano – 1999
- Rhapsody for Cello and Piano – 2000
- Russian Dance for symphony orchestra – 1969
- Shoshana for Piano, 6 hands – 1995
- Sonata for piano – 1972
- Sonata for violin and piano – 1976
- Songs for Piano No. 1, first steps for young pianists – 1989
- Songs for Piano No. 2, first steps for young pianists – 1989
- Spring Song, for alto saxophone and piano – 2003
- The Book of Animals, ten easy piano pieces – 1994
- The Book of Animals No. 2, six pieces for piano – 1996
- The Cat's House, Opera for Children – 1987
- Tumbalalaika, for piano 4 hands – 1995
- Two Pieces for Piano – 2003
- Valse Fantasia, for violin & piano – 1997
- Variations, for piano – 2002
- Viva España, arr. For piano 4 hands – 2001
- When Peace Comes, for two violins – 1997
- Yism'chu Hashamayim, for piano 4 hands – 1996
