= Imants Zemzaris =

Latvian composer and teacher (born 1951)

Imants Zemzaris (born 14 April 1951) is a Latvian composer and teacher.

His family is famous in Latvia due to his grandfather Jānis Endzelīns. A native of Riga, he studied in Emīls Dārziņš Music School and Latvia State Conservatory with Ādolfs Skulte. Among his compositions are chamber and vocal music, as well as music for theatre and movies. He is also an interpreter of his own piano music.
