= Ādolfs Skulte =

Latvian composer and pedagogue

Ādolfs Skulte (28 October 1909 – 20 March 2000) was a Latvian composer and pedagogue. People's Artist of the USSR (1979).

Among his pupils were the composers Aivars Kalējs, Romualds Kalsons, Imants Zemzaris, Romualds Grīnblats, Mārtiņš Brauns and Imants Kalniņš. As a composer, he wrote orchestral and vocal music, as well as three operas (one for children) and two ballets. His brother was the composer Bruno Skulte, and his son was cinematographer Gvido Skulte.
