= Jānis Ivanovs =

Latvian composer (1906–1983)

- Born: 9 October 1906 [O.S. September 26] Babri, Preiļi Municipality, Vitebsk Governorate, Russian Empire (present-day Latvia)
- Died: 27 March 1983 (aged 76); Riga, Latvian SSR, Soviet Union
- Occupations: Composer; teacher

Jānis Ivanovs (Note: Latvian: Jānis Ivanovs; Russian: Янис Андреевич Иванов, romanized: Yanis Andreyevich Ivanov) (9 October 1906 [O.S. September 26] – 27 March 1983) was a Latvian composer whose later career took place in the Soviet Union.

== Biography ==
In 1931, he graduated from the Latvian State Conservatory in Riga. In 1944, he joined the conservatory's faculty, becoming a full professor in 1955.

He is regarded as being the most distinguished Latvian symphonist. His love of melody is evident in each of his compositions, and forms the essence of his works. He often drew inspiration from the native songs of the Latgale district in eastern Latvia. His grasp of orchestral color and musical texture were highly regarded by his colleagues. The Latvian composer and music critic Marģeris Zariņš described Ivanovs' symphonies as "like ancient Greek tragedies, filled with ecstasy and purification." He is mostly remembered for his twenty-one symphonies. Nevertheless, he composed in many other fields, including five symphonic poems, concertos for piano, violin and cello, three string quartets, and numerous vocal, piano and various chamber works.

He became the People's Artist of the USSR in 1965, was awarded the Stalin Prize in 1950 and Latvian SSR State Prize in 1959 and 1970.

== Compositions ==
=== Symphonies ===
- No. 1 in B♭ minor Poema Sinfonia (1933)
- No. 2 in D minor (1937)
- No. 3 in F minor (1938)
- No. 4 Atlantis with female choir (1941)
- No. 5 in C major (1945)
- No. 6 Latgalian (1949)
- No. 7 in C minor (1953)
- No. 8 in B minor (1956)
- No. 9 (1960)
- No. 10 (1963)
- No. 11 in E♭ minor (1965)
- No. 12 in C major Sinfonia Energica (1967)
- No. 13 in D minor Sinfonia Humana (1969)
- No. 14 Sinfonia da Camera for string orchestra (1971)
- No. 15 Sinfonia Ipsa (1972)
- No. 16 (1974)
- No. 17 in C major (1976)
- No. 18 (1977)
- No. 19 (1979)
- No. 20 in E♭ major (1981)
- No. 21 in C major (1983, Unfinished)

=== Tone poems ===
- Rainbow (1939)
- Lāčplēsis (1957)
- Poema Luttuoso for string orchestra (1966)
- Novella Brevis (1982)

=== Other orchestral works ===
- Violin Concerto in E minor (1951)
- Cello Concerto in B minor (1952)
- Piano Concerto in D minor (1959)

=== Chamber music ===
- String Quartet No. 1 (1931/32)
- String Quartet No. 2 in C major (1946)
- String Quartet No. 3 (1961)
- Piano Trio (1976, published 1979)

=== Piano works ===
- Three Sketches
- Sonata Brevis
- Andante Replicado in E♭ minor

=== Choral music ===
- Vocalises for SATB chorus a capella (1964–1982)
