= Volfgangs Dārziņš =

Latvian composer, pianist and music critic

- Born: 25 September 1906; Rīga, Russian Empire (now Latvia)
- Died: 24 June 1962 (aged 55); Seattle, Washington, U.S.
- Education: Latvian conservatory
- Known for: Music

Volfgangs Dārziņš (25 September 1906 – 24 June 1962) was a Latvian composer, pianist and music critic.

== Biography ==
Volfgangs Dārziņš was born on 25 September 1906 in Riga to Latvian composer Emīls Dārziņš and Marija Deidere. He was named Volfgangs in honour of Wolfgang Amadeus Mozart. He studied composition at the Latvian Conservatory under Jāzeps Vītols and graduated in 1929. Later he continued studies in the conservatory's piano class, from which he graduated in 1934. In 1933 Dārziņš participated in VIII Latvian National Song Festival where several of his Latvian folk song arrangements were acclaimed.

He also worked for several Latvian newspapers as music critic. Overall he published more than 1000 articles. During this time he also became known for extensive research into Latvian folk music, mapping the distribution of many folksongs.

In 1944 he emigrated to Germany and lived in the main Latvian displaced persons center, Esslingen. In 1950 he relocated to United States and until 1955 worked as a teacher in Spokane Conservatory. He also worked in a music school of the University of Washington and was a conductor of several church choirs. Also he continued to perform as a pianist and made several concert tours through the country. His most notable performance was in Carnegie Hall, New York City in 1954. He became close friends with two of his students, Ken Benshoof and Alden Andreassen. Andreassen began performing Dārziņš' songs in memorial concerts after 1962.

Volfgangs Dārziņš died in Seattle, on 24 June 1962.

Volfgangs Dārziņš is best known for his ability to include folk motives into classical music. He made more than 200 Latvian folk song arrangements for piano and voice and also for symphonic orchestra. Also he wrote two piano concertos and several suites. He developed a strong original style, influenced to some degree by Béla Bartók and Igor Stravinsky. His compositions are in three categories: piano, solo vocal and choral.
