= Jāzeps Vītols =

Latvian composer, pedagogue and music critic

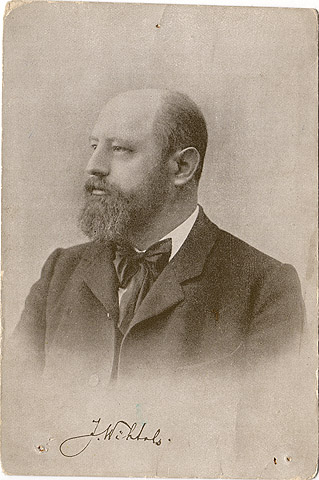
- Born: 26 July 1863; Valmiera, Russian Empire
- Died: 24 April 1948 (aged 84); Lübeck, Germany
- Resting place: Forest Cemetery, Riga
- Education: Saint Petersburg Conservatory
- Known for: Music
- Spouse(s): Annija Vītols b. 3 February 1890

Jāzeps Vītols (German: Joseph Wihtol; 26 July 1863 – 24 April 1948) was a Latvian composer, pedagogue and music critic. He is considered one of the fathers of Latvian classical music.

== Biography ==
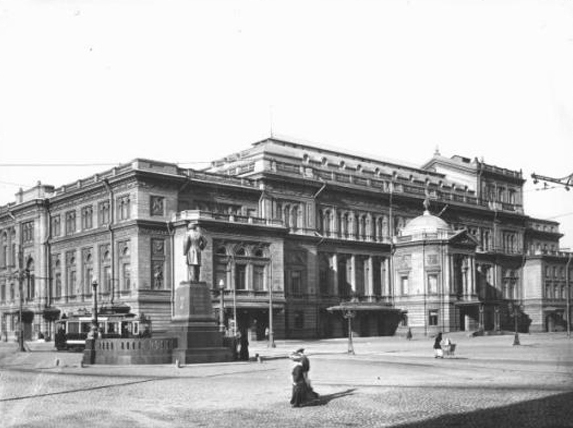
St. Petersburg Conservatory, 1913

Vītols, born in Valmiera the son of a schoolteacher, began his studies in composition in 1880 at the Saint Petersburg Conservatory with Nikolai Rimsky-Korsakov. After graduating in 1886, he remained at the Conservatory to teach composition and reached the rank of Professor in 1901. His pupils there included Nikolai Myaskovsky and Sergei Prokofiev. Vītols was a close friend of fellow professors Alexander Glazunov and Anatoly Lyadov; he would regularly participate at Mitrofan Belyayev's "Weekly Fridays"—regular meetings of prominent Russian composers at Belyayev's home. At the time, Belyayev was Vītols' primary publisher. Besides academia, Vītols also spent time as a music critic for the St Petersburger Zeitung from 1897 to 1914.

In 1918, Vītols returned from Russia to his newly independent Latvia to conduct the Latvian National Opera. The following year, he established the first Latvian Conservatory of Music, which was later renamed the Jāzeps Vītols Latvian Academy of Music in his honor, and he ran the composition classes there between 1919 and 1944. His most prominent students during his tenure were Jānis Ivanovs, Ādolfs Skulte, Lauma Reinholde, and Tālivaldis Ķeniņš. He also helped co-found the Latvian Composers' Society in 1923. In 1944, he moved to Lübeck in Germany and lived there until his death in 1948. His remains were returned to Riga in 1993.

Vītols was active not only as a composer, pedagogue, and conductor, but was also a pianist and prolific music critic. He was a member of Latvian student fraternity Fraternitas Lataviensis.

His choral music, especially Gaismas pils (The Castle of Light) is very popular with Latvian choirs, and is often included in the repertoire of the Latvian Song and Dance Festival. Vītols vocal and choral works are published by Musica Baltica Ltd in Riga. He died in Lübeck.

== Style ==
Taking his cue from his Russian colleagues, Vītols became the leading exponent of national romanticism in Latvia. He is considered to be the father of a distinctively Latvian classical music, being the first Latvian composer to achieve international stature. His work reveals the undeniable influence of his teacher Rimsky-Korsakov, not least in the brilliance of its orchestration, an assessment which was shared by Vītols' friend and fellow composer Alexander Glazunov. During his time in Russia, Vītols became deeply interested in Latvian folklore and conducted the Latvian Choir in Saint Petersburg. His melodies clearly draw upon his heritage, and often directly feature Latvian folk tunes. In striving to forge a musical style for Latvia, Vītols emulated the processes of the Russian national school. His large-scale works, which are mostly cast in sonata form, are often characterized by impressive dramatic development. Overall, in comparison with many other 20th-century composers, he tended to be rather conservative but nonetheless possessed a masterly composition technique.

== Works ==
Opus	Orchestral	Chamber	Vocal	Piano	Year
1				Piano Sonata in B-flat minor	1886
21	Dramatic Overture				1895
27		String Quartet in G major			1899
35			The Song (Dziesma)		1908
45			Northern Lights (Ziemeļblāzma)		1914
14		Récit for Viola or Cello and Piano			1894
32		8 Latvian Folk Tunes for Piano			
	Symphony in E minor				1886–88
37	Sprīdītis: Amethysts; Emeralds; Pearls; Rubies; Diamonds				1907
42	Fantasy on Latvian Folk Tunes				1908–10
	Autumn Song (Rudens dziesma)				1928
28	The Bard of Beverīna (Beverīnas dziedonis)				1891
—			Sermon on the Mount (Kalna sprediķi)		1943
12			Sketch for Cello and Piano		
8			Berceuse		1892
39	Rhapsody On Lithuanian Folksongs				
29			10 Chants Populaires Lettons: Skaisti dziedi lakstīgala Rīgas torņa galiņā; Apkārt kalnu gāju, kalniņa uzkapu,? Redzēj' savu sirdspuķīti gauži raudādam!; Āvu, āvu baltas kājas, Lecu dārziņā; Aijā, žūžu, lāča bērnis Plakanāmi kājiņāmi; Trīcēt trīcēj' visa Rīga Kas to Rīgu trīcināj'?; Pūt vējiņi, dzen laiviņu, Aizdzen mani Kurzemē; Redz kur jāja div' bajāri, Zīda pušķi zemi slauka; Pati māte savu dēlu Kara vīru audzināja; Kas to līgo ielīgoja? ligo! Mūsu pašu ciema ļaudis, līgo!; Irbit gulēj' ceļmalāi, Baida manu kumeliņ'!		1901
6			Variations sur un Theme Lette		1892
7			Six Mélodies: Chant du Mendiant: „Faites l’aumône, bonnesgens“.; Berceuse: „O souris grise, apporte le sommeil“.; Chant du Ruisseau: „J’ai quitté les monts“.; „Je ne puis rire“.; Chant de Pêcheurs: „Mère Dvina, mère chère“.; Je t’aime: „Je me rappelle ton premier sourire“.		1892
3				Humoresque	1890
4	La fête Lihgo				1889
5			3 Songs (Dziesmas): Das Blatt im Buche: "Ich hab’ eine alte Muhme"; Schlimme Ahnung: "Flüchtig ist dein Kuss, Geliebte"; Zu spät: "Sie haben dich fortgetragen"		1892
2	Mélodie et Mazurka				1889
43				3 Reminiscences	1914
53			3 Songs (Dziesmas): Die Welle ("Hell strahlt die Sonne"); Nebeltage ("Nun die Welt trübe"); Lächeln ("Lächle einmal noch")		1919
55		Berceuse in A			1921
11			3 Mélodies for Voice and Piano: Heimkehr: "Es wintert draussen mit aller Macht"; Die Fenster waren gefroren; Du schläfst da so ruhig und süss		
13				3 Preludes	1894
15		Romance			1894
50			5 chansons d'ete (Vasaras dziesmas)		1918
16				3 Preludes	1895
2				4 Morceaux	1895
58			12 Chansons Enfantines		1921
63				Piano Sonatina in B minor	1927
52			3 Songs (Dziesmas): Dünastrom, Schwarzauge; Wiegenlied fürs Herz ("Törichtes Herz"); Frühlingstage ("Kein Klagelaut jemals erkling")		1919
66		Dargakeni: Amethysts (Lento); Emeralds (Allegro rustico); Pearls (Allegro); Rubies (Agitato); Diamonds (Allegro di molto)			1924
68				8 miniatures (Astonas miniaturas)	1928
—			String Quartet No. 1		1885
—			Esquisse		1894
10				3 Preludes	1893
9			Mazurka et Valse		1892
34			Songs		
35	Das Lied				
61			3 Songs (Dziesmas)		1925
59			3 Songs (Dziesmas)		1923
24				Valse-Caprice	1897
			Song of the Sun’s Radiance		1911
		There is Still a Silent Night in My Mind			1911
23				2 Morceaux	1897
25				3 Morceaux	1897
33				Deux miniatures (Divas miniaturas)	1905
	Rhapsody for Violin and Orchestra				1918
57		Carmina			1927
38			3 Silhouettes		1909
41				2 Morceaux: —; Au Clair de la Lune	1910
44			3 songs (Dziesmas)		1910
48			5 preludes de Naurena Elzas		1914
54				Variations-portraits	1920
17				3 Morceaux	1895
18				Berceuse et Étude	1895
19				2 Preludes	1895
20				4 Morceaux	1895
22					
31			7 Lieder (Dziesmas): Mans kaps (Mein Grab); Mirdzas Lied: "Mondenstrahlen weben"; "Im Sinn liegt mir die stille Nacht"		1903-21
26				3 Études	1898
36					
30				3 Preludes	1903
40			8 Songs (Dziesmas)		1909
46					
47					
49			5 Latvian Folk Songs		1916
51			3 Songs (Dziesmas)		1919
56			3 Lieder (Trīs dziesmas): Rozes visskaistākās; Laimītei; Laimas sveiciens		1921
60			Le Chagrin du Pueple (Tautas bedas): —; —; —		1923
62			3 Songs (Dziesmas)		1925
64					
65
67
—	Autumn Song (Rudens Dzisma)				
—	Symphony in E minor				1886–87
—	Symphony No.2				1901
—	Tom Thumb				1908
—	Song of a Fisherwoman				1911
—	Song of the Sun’s Radiance				1911
—	There is Still a Silent Night in My Mind				1911
—	Goblet on the Isle of the Dead				1911
—	Rhapsody for Violin and Orchestra				1918
—	From the Tree of Acknowledgement				1924
—	A Song of Autumn				1928
—	Latvian Country Serenade for orchestra				1934
—	Sermon on the Mount				1943
—	Legend for string quartet				1942
—				Pastorale (Pastorāle) for Organ	1913
—				29 mélodies de chorals d'après le livre de l'église évangélique luthérienne lettonne (29 korāļi meldiju grāmatā latvijas evaņģēliski – luterāņu draudzēm)	1924
—				Liturgie (Liturģija)	1934
—				Liturgie de Pâques (Lieldienu liturģija)	1935

=== Musicology works ===
- Anatoly Konstantinovich Lyadov: life, works and the time (one of the essays published with the biography essay by Victor Valter and rememberes by Sergey Gorodetsky) (1916)

== Celebration and remembrance ==
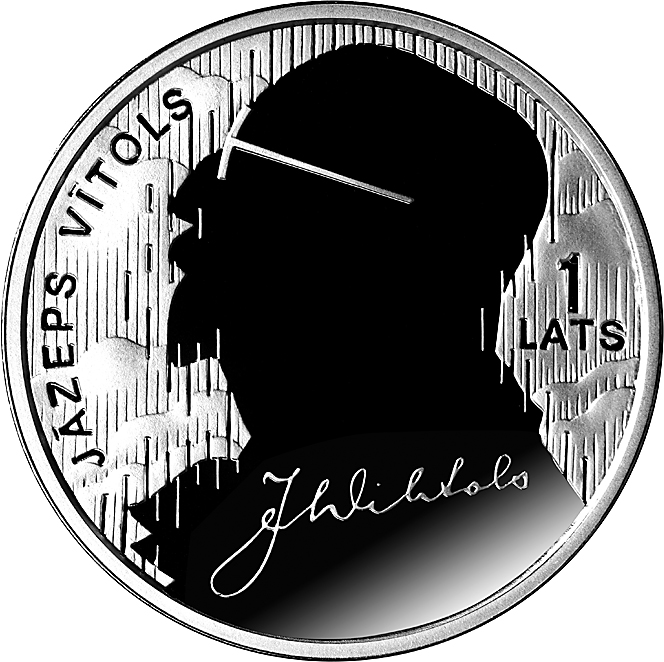
1 lats coin commemorating Vītols' 150th birthday, 2013.

Jāzeps Vītols music days in Gaujiena started soon after 1922, when he spent summers in Gaujiena "Anniņas" with his wife. Celebrating his birthday, different choirs from all over the country started coming to Gaujiena for July 26 to celebrate Vītols' birthday with music. In 2003, a summer camp for children from music schools was started around this celebration, creating an orchestra and a choir to celebrate music and have fun as well as practice their instruments.
