= Latvian National Opera =

Opera house and company in Riga

Coordinates: 56°57′19″N 24°06′17″E

Latvian National Opera Latvijas Nacionālā opera (in Latvian)
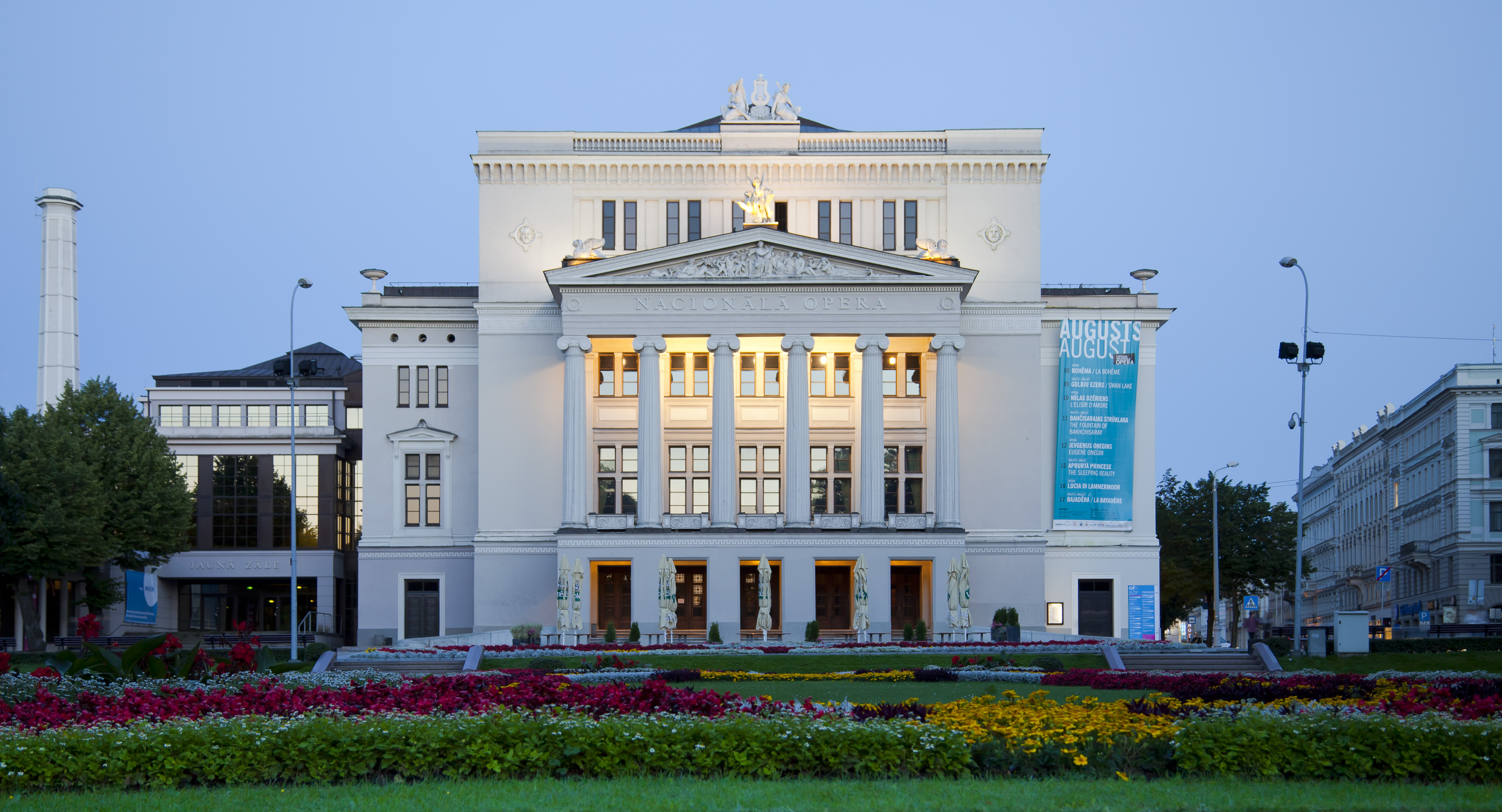
- Interactive map of the Latvian National Opera; Latvijas Nacionālā opera (in Latvian) area

General information
- Architectural style: Classicism
- Location: Riga, Latvia
- Completed: 1863; 163 years ago

Design and construction
- Architect: Ludwig Bohnstedt

Other information
- Seating capacity: 100 (Red Hall) to 946 (Grand Hall)

Website
- www.opera.lv

The Latvian National Opera and Ballet (LNOB) is an opera house and opera company at Aspazijas boulevard 3 in Riga. Its repertoire includes performances of opera and ballet presented during the season which lasts from mid-September to the end of May. During a typical season, LNOB presents almost 200 performances, including, on average, 6 new productions. The largest is the Great Hall which houses 946 seats, while the smaller ones – the New Hall, the Dress Circle Hall (Beletāžas zāle) and the Red Hall – have a maximum seating capacity of 338, 170 and 100 respectively. LNOB employs a total of approximately 600 people. The building is located on the bank of the Riga Canal, near the Freedom Monument. As of 5 November 2019, the chairman of the board is Egils Siliņš, an opera singer. The chief conductor since 2013 is Mārtiņš Ozoliņš who is also an associate professor at the Jāzeps Vītols Latvian Academy of Music. The ballet artistic director since 1993 has been Aivars Leimanis.

== History ==
The origins of the Latvian National Opera and Ballet stem back to 1782 when the Riga City Theatre (Rigaer Stadttheater) a.k.a. the Musse Building was opened. It was designed by Christoph Haberland and housed a total of 500 seats. Its director Otto Hermann von Vietinghoff personally funded a symphony orchestra of 24 musicians. Conrad Feige who staged productions not only in Riga but also in St. Petersburg, Reval (Tallinn) and Dorpat (Tartu), was invited to fill the posts of concert master and conductor. When in 1788 von Vietinghoff moved to St. Petersburg an actor by the name of Meierer took over the position. In 1815 the Musse Society (die Gesellschaft der Musse) bought the building from the von Vietinghoff family. Richard Wagner was the Kapellmeister of the theatre from 1837 to 1839.

In the period of 1860–1863 a new Riga City Theatre building was constructed with almost 3000 seats. The first productions were Friedrich Schiller's Wallenstein's Camp and Ludwig van Beethoven's Fidelio. On 14 June 1882, the theatre burnt down after which only the outer walls had remained. The building was renovated from 1882 to 1887 following a design by the city's chief architect Reinhold Schmaeling. The theatre was closed for the German company during World War I. Until 1915 the Riga Imperial Music School used the building for its concerts. During the 1916–1917 season, Angarov and Rudin's Russian drama company performed there, with the theatre being renamed as the German City Theater in Riga (Deutsches Stadt-Theater in Riga) on 29 September. The last performance of the German company in the theatre took place on 1 January 1919. The next afternoon, the building's annex burnt down, which was fully restored only in 1922.

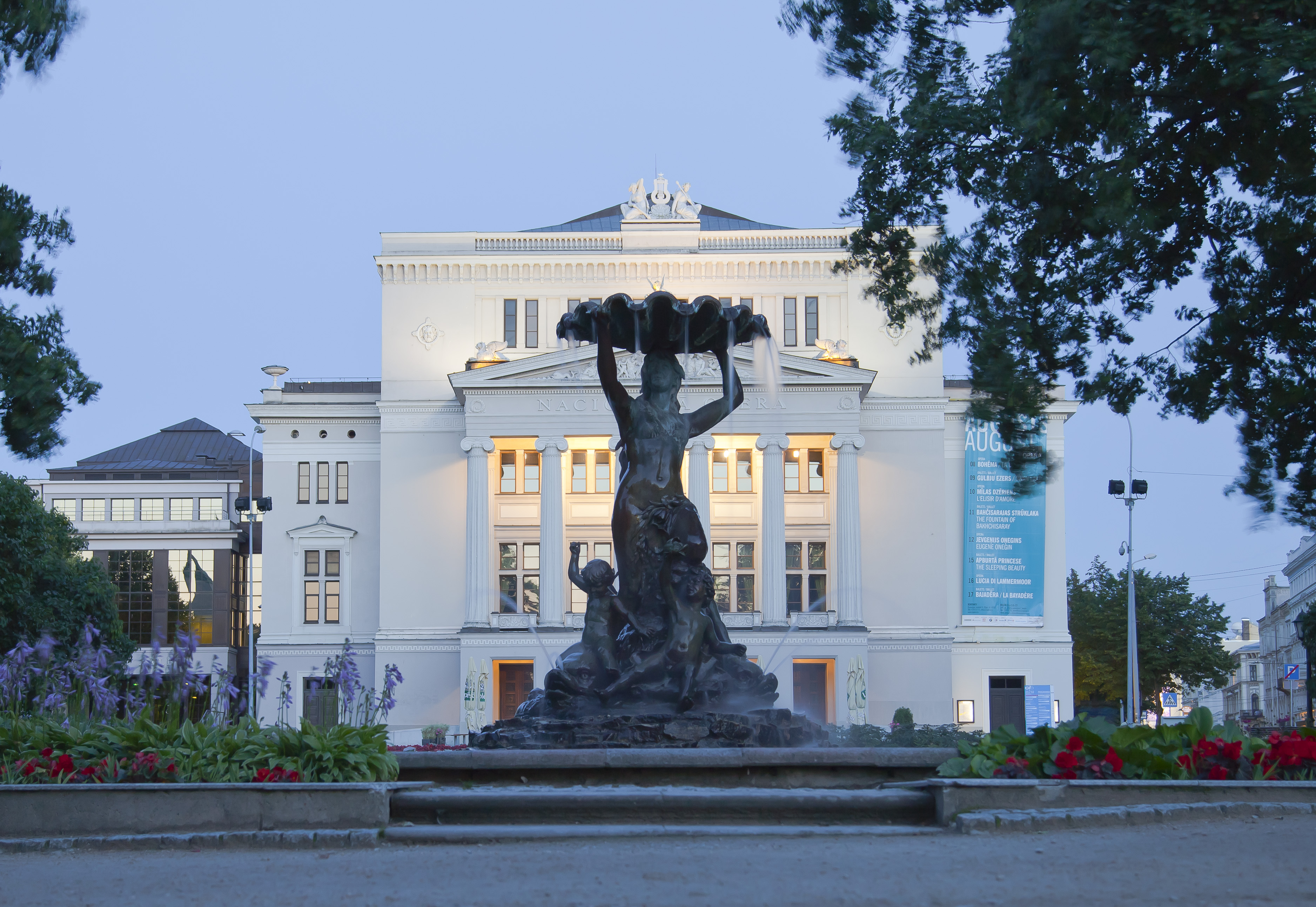
Nymph fountain in front of the Latvian National Opera, by August Volz (1903)

On 27 December 1912, the Latvian Opera (Latviešu opera), directed by Pāvuls Jurjāns (1866–1948), began performing in the auditorium of the Latvian Society House with a production of Pyotr Tchaikovsky's Eugene Onegin. Some of the company spent the years of the First World War in Riga, but some evacuated to Russia. Under Jurjāns, the Latvian Opera resumed its activities in Riga in January 1918, with a production of Giuseppe Verdi's La Traviata and several operettas: Johann Strauss Jr's Die Fledermaus, Franz Lehár's The Merry Widow, Rudolf Dellinger's Don Cesar and Johann Strauss II's The Gypsy Baron (Der Zigeunerbaron). In August 1918, Hauptmann Paul Hopf – Head of the City of Riga under German occupation – received the following letter of gratitude:

"Under [his] aegis, the Latvian theatre received the second theatre building with the same rights as pertain to the German theatre in the first building. [..] Not only drama performances took place, there were also some rehearsals of the Latvian Opera".

The Latvian Opera conducted performances during the first half of 1918 in the same premises which now house the Latvian National Theatre where another opera company with a slightly different name (Latvju opera) began its activities in autumn of that year. The initiative of the Latvju opera originated in Dorpat in the society named Apgāda organized by lawyer Andrejs Frīdenbergs. Organizational work continued in St Petersburg to where many Latvian artists had evacuated during the First World War.

Jāzeps Vītols was a seminal figure in the development of Latvian opera and the first director of Latvju opera, holding the post until the end of December 1918. In his memoir, Vītols gives a detailed description of the formation of Latvju opera in the summer of 1918. After the Brest-Litovsk Peace Treaty was signed in 1918 many evacuees could return to Riga. On 15 September 1918, the opening concert took place and on 15 October 1918, Richard Wagner's The Flying Dutchman was performed, with Teodors Reiters as the conductor. On 19 November, The Flying Dutchman was performed without changing the decorations from the previous night, when the Declaration of Sovereignty of the Republic of Latvia was adopted under solemn circumstances.

After the Bolsheviks led by Pyotr Ivanovich Stuchka took power in early 1919 establishing Soviet rule in Latvia, Andrejs Upīts – Head of the Education Commissariat's Art Department – gave an order for Latvju opera to move to the former Stadttheater and the company did so on 23 January 1919. On this day a performance of the 15 October 1918, production of The Flying Dutchman took place in the new location. An important role in the move was played by Teodors Reiters, chief conductor of Latvju opera since September 1918. In January 1919, he became the director of the Opera. On 9 February 1919, the Bolshevik government issued a decree whereby the Opera was nationalized to become the Opera of Soviet Latvia and to be financed from the state budget.

After the Stučka government was overthrown, the company returned to its original name Latvju opera.. On 23 September 1919, the Regulation "On the National Opera" was adopted by the Cabinet of Ministers of the Republic of Latvia. Just as under the Bolsheviks, the company was lawfully guaranteed a building, status of the national opera, and state financing. On 2 December, a performance of Richard Wagner's Tannhäuser took place. It had premiered in Latvia already on 10 May 1919, under the direction of Dmitry Arbenin and conductor Teodors Reiters, when it was the Opera of Soviet Latvia. Until the end of the 1930s, 2 December was celebrated as the anniversary of the Latvian National Opera (LNO), but under the Soviet occupation, the date was 23 January. In the years 1920–1940, the Latvian National Opera played a central role in Riga's musical life. Every year, 8 new productions premiered and, starting with a production of a ballet by Peter Ludwig Hertel, ballets were also staged. In 20 years, more than 300 performances took place, with the average annual audience of 220,000.

In 1940 when the Soviet Union occupied Latvia the name of the theatre was changed to the "Opera and Ballet Theatre of the Latvian SSR". Under the Nazi German occupation (1941–1944), it became the Riga Opera Theatre, only to revert to the name given in 1940 when Soviet troops re-occupied Latvia in 1945. On 24 April 1989, the Opera celebrated its 70th anniversary and changed its name back to the one from the interwar period.

After the season finale with Giuseppe Verdi's Un ballo in maschera in 1990 reconstruction work was started on the building with a reopening in 1995. The opera company returned to its home stage with a production of the opera Uguns un Nakts by Jānis Mediņš. In 2001, construction work on a complex of annexes was completed, providing audiences with the New Hall that can seat 300 people. The Latvian National Opera celebrated its 90th anniversary with a concert on 22 December 2009, and its centenary with two gala concerts on 16 and 17 November 2018. Since 1998 the Riga Opera Festival is held at the opera house. Due to the COVID-19 pandemic the Opera Theatre was closed and reopened multiple times in 2020 whilst making some productions available for online streaming.

== Artists ==
The well known Richard Wagner was working at the Riga City Theatre from 1837 to 1839. It is the period when he was starting to compose his third opera Rienzi. More recently Andris Nelsons was appointed to the post of chief conductor from 2003 to 2007. Nelsons is a regular conductor of the world's top orchestras. Additionally, multiple world famous opera singers have started their careers at this opera house. A prime example is the mezzo-soprano Elīna Garanča as well as the soprano Kristine Opolais. The opera house has undertaken guest performances at the Hongkong festival, Grand Théâtre de Bordeaux in France, Teatro Massimo Bellini in Italy, Bolshoi Theatre in Moscow, Luxembourg Opera Theatre etc.

The orchestra consists of more than 100 players. Many of them have been recognized as soloists or together as a chamber music ensemble. More than 250 performances are conducted during a typical season. The repertoire consists of more than 50 operas and ballets ranging from Baroque to contemporary classical music styles. The opera house, since 1918, employs a choir and a ballet group, the latter of which was initially closely tied to Russian Ballet traditions since the first ballet dancers and teachers were hired from Russia.
