= Jāzeps Vītols Latvian Academy of Music =

Music school in Riga, Latvia

Coordinates: 56°56′58.8″N 24°7′2.6″E

- Jāzepa Vītola Latvijas Mūzikas akadēmija
- Former name: Jāzeps Vītols Latvian conservatory
- Type: Public
- Established: 1919; 107 years ago
- Rector: Ilona Meija
- Administrative staff: 117
- Students: 600 (2008)
- Location: 1 Kr. Barona Street, Rīga, Latvia
- Campus: Urban
- Website: www.jvlma.lv/

Jāzeps Vītols Latvian Academy of Music (Latvian: Jāzepa Vītola Latvijas Mūzikas akadēmija), formerly the Riga Conservatory, is a higher music conservatory in Riga, Latvia. The junior institute is the Emīls Dārziņš Music School.

== History ==
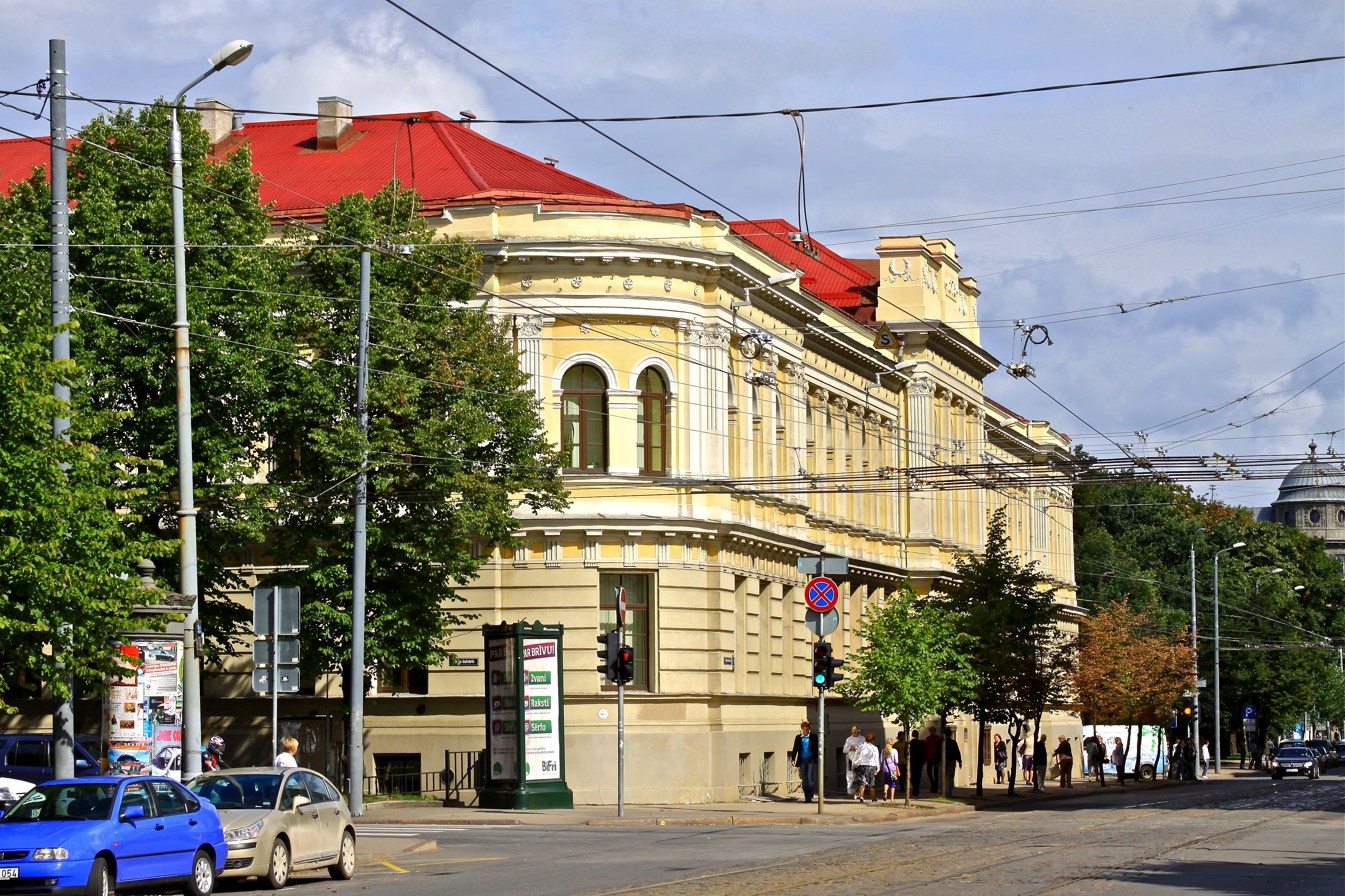
Main building of the Academy

The Latvian Conservatory of Music was founded in 1919 by Latvian composer Jāzeps Vītols, who became the first director of the Latvian National Opera. He remained director until 1944, excepting 1935–1937 when the director was his choral assistant Pauls Jozuus. Junior and senior courses covered around 9 to 10 academic years. Beginning in 1940, the structure of the conservatory changed: lower junior courses were transferred to the secondary education system and later became a base for Jāzeps Mediņš's and Emīls Dārziņš's secondary schools of music. Higher courses were offered in the conservatory. Beginning 1 October 1951 LPSR Institute of Theater was attached to the conservatory, reorganizing it to a faculty of theater with departments for acting and directing. In May 1958 it was renamed Jāzeps Vītols Latvian conservatory. In January 1964 the conservatory was momentarily renamed to J. Vītols Latvian institute of Art, but in July the earlier name returned to the earlier name.

== Organization ==
=== Departments ===
The Academy is divided into the following departments:

- Piano Department
- Department of Accompanists
- Department of Compulsory Piano
- Department of Chamber Ensemble and Piano Accompaniment
- Department of String Instruments
- Department of Wind Instruments
- Department of Jazz Music
- Department of Orchestra Conducting
- Department of Choir Conducting
- Department of Vocal Music
- Department of Early Music
- Department of Choreography
- Department of Music Education
- Department of Instrument Performance Teaching
- Department of Music Technology
- Department of Composition
- Department of Musicology
- Department of Humanities
- Department of Science and Research
- Department of Self-Financed Studies
- Department of Doctoral Studies

== Notable teaching staff ==
The following have been Academy Rectors:

- Jāzeps Vītols (1919—1935)
- Pauls Jozuus (1935—1937)
- Alfrēds Kalniņš (1944–1948)
- Jēkabs Mediņš (1948–1950)
- Jānis Ozoliņš (1951–1977)
- Imants Kokars (1977–1990)
- Juris Karlsons (1990–2007)
- Artis Sīmanis (2007–2017)
- Guntars Prānis (2017–2024)
- Ilona Meija (since 2024)

Lūcija Garūta taught composition and music theory from 1940 and was elected to a professorship in 1960.

During the republic, the State Conservatory had only one Jewish professor of music, Adolf Metz, head of the violin department. Many Jewish students emigrated to Lithuania.

== Notable alumni ==
- Misha Alexandrovich, cantor
- Iveta Apkalna, pianist and organist
- Volfgangs Dārziņš
- Ēriks Ešenvalds, composer
- Sarah Feigin
- Elīna Garanča, mezzo-soprano
- Inese Galante, soprano
- Jānis Ivanovs, composer
- Arvīds Jansons
- Olga Jegunova, pianist
- Oleg Kagan, violinist
- Aivars Kalējs, organist and composer
- Gidon Kremer, violinist
- Armands Melnbārdis, musician and recording artist
- Kristīne Opolais, soprano
- Raimonds Pauls
- Uģis Prauliņš
- Uldis Pūcītis, actor
- Lauma Reinholde, composer, pianist and teacher
- Alfred Strombergs, conductor, vocal coach, and pianist
- Aleksandrs Viļumanis, conductor
- Imants Zemzaris
