= List of Knight's Cross of the Iron Cross recipients (P) =

The Knight's Cross of the Iron Cross (German: Ritterkreuz des Eisernen Kreuzes) and its variants were the highest awards in the military and paramilitary forces of Nazi Germany during World War II. The Knight's Cross of the Iron Cross was awarded for a wide range of reasons and across all ranks, from a senior commander for skilled leadership of his troops in battle to a low-ranking soldier for a single act of extreme gallantry. A total of 7,321 awards were made between its first presentation on 30 September 1939 and its last bestowal on 17 June 1945. (Note: Großadmiral and President of Germany Karl Dönitz, Hitler's successor as Head of State (Staatsoberhaupt) and Supreme Commander of the Armed Forces, had ordered the cessation of all promotions and awards as of 11 May 1945 (Dönitz-decree). Consequently the last Knight's Cross awarded to Oberleutnant zur See of the Reserves Georg-Wolfgang Feller on 17 June 1945 must therefore be considered a de facto but not de jure hand-out.) This number is based on the analysis and acceptance of the order commission of the Association of Knight's Cross Recipients (AKCR). Presentations were made to members of the three military branches of the Wehrmacht—the Heer (Army), Kriegsmarine (Navy) and Luftwaffe (Air Force)—as well as the Waffen-SS, the Reichsarbeitsdienst (RAD—Reich Labour Service) and the Volkssturm (German national militia). There were also 43 recipients in the military forces of allies of the Third Reich.

These recipients are listed in the 1986 edition of Walther-Peer Fellgiebel's book, Die Träger des Ritterkreuzes des Eisernen Kreuzes 1939–1945 [The Bearers of the Knight's Cross of the Iron Cross 1939–1945]. Fellgiebel was the former chairman and head of the order commission of the AKCR. In 1996, the second edition of this book was published with an addendum delisting 11 of these original recipients. Author Veit Scherzer has cast doubt on a further 193 of these listings. The majority of the disputed recipients had been nominated for the award in 1945, when the deteriorating situation of Germany during the final days of World War II left a number of nominations incomplete and pending in various stages of the approval process.

Listed here are the 324 Knight's Cross recipients of the Wehrmacht and Waffen-SS whose last name starts with "P". Fellgiebel himself delisted one and Scherzer has challenged the validity of five more of these listings. The recipients are initially ordered alphabetically by last name. The rank listed is the recipient's rank at the time the Knight's Cross was awarded.

== Background ==
The Knight's Cross of the Iron Cross and its higher grades were based on four separate enactments. The first enactment, Reichsgesetzblatt I S. 1573 of 1 September 1939 instituted the Iron Cross (Eisernes Kreuz), the Knight's Cross of the Iron Cross and the Grand Cross of the Iron Cross (Großkreuz des Eisernen Kreuzes). Article 2 of the enactment mandated that the award of a higher class be preceded by the award of all preceding classes. As the war progressed, some of the recipients of the Knight's Cross distinguished themselves further and a higher grade, the Knight's Cross of the Iron Cross with Oak Leaves (Ritterkreuz des Eisernen Kreuzes mit Eichenlaub), was instituted. The Oak Leaves, as they were commonly referred to, were based on the enactment Reichsgesetzblatt I S. 849 of 3 June 1940. In 1941, two higher grades of the Knight's Cross were instituted. The enactment Reichsgesetzblatt I S. 613 of 28 September 1941 introduced the Knight's Cross of the Iron Cross with Oak Leaves and Swords (Ritterkreuz des Eisernen Kreuzes mit Eichenlaub und Schwertern) and the Knight's Cross of the Iron Cross with Oak Leaves, Swords and Diamonds (Ritterkreuz des Eisernen Kreuzes mit Eichenlaub, Schwertern und Brillanten). At the end of 1944 the final grade, the Knight's Cross of the Iron Cross with Golden Oak Leaves, Swords, and Diamonds (Ritterkreuz des Eisernen Kreuzes mit goldenem Eichenlaub, Schwertern und Brillanten), based on the enactment Reichsgesetzblatt 1945 I S. 11 of 29 December 1944, became the final variant of the Knight's Cross authorized.

== Recipients ==
Knight's Cross of the Iron Cross (P)
Service	Number of presentations	Posthumous presentations
Heer (incl. Volkssturm)	208	22
Kriegsmarine	15	0
Luftwaffe	77	9
Waffen-SS	24	1

The Oberkommando der Wehrmacht (Supreme Command of the Armed Forces) kept separate Knight's Cross lists for the Heer (Army), Kriegsmarine (Navy), Luftwaffe (Air Force) and Waffen-SS. Within each of these lists a unique sequential number was assigned to each recipient. The same numbering paradigm was applied to the higher grades of the Knight's Cross, one list per grade. Of the 324 awards made to servicemen whose last name starts with "P", 32 were later awarded the Knight's Cross of the Iron Cross with Oak Leaves and six the Knight's Cross of the Iron Cross with Oak Leaves and Swords; 32 presentations were made posthumously. Heer members received 208 of the medals, including one to the Volkssturm; 15 went to the Kriegsmarine, 77 to the Luftwaffe, and 24 to the Waffen-SS. The sequential numbers greater than 843 for the Knight's Cross of the Iron Cross with Oak Leaves are unofficial and were assigned by the Association of Knight's Cross Recipients (AKCR) and are therefore denoted in parentheses.

This along with the + (plus) indicates that a higher grade of Knight's Cross was awarded as well.
This along with the * (asterisk) indicates that the Knight's Cross was awarded posthumously.
This along with the ! (exclamation mark) indicates that author Walther-Peer Fellgiebel has expressed doubt regarding the veracity and formal correctness of the listing.
This along with the ? (question mark) indicates that author Veit Scherzer has expressed doubt regarding the veracity and formal correctness of the listing.

Name	Service	Rank	Role and unit (Note: For an explanation of the various naming schemes used by the Luftwaffe, Heer, Kriegsmarine and Waffen-SS refer to nomenclature used by the Wehrmacht and Waffen-SS.)	Date of award	Notes	Image
Karl Pabst	Heer	Hauptmann	Commander of the III./Gebirgs-Artillerie-Regiment 112	4 November 1943	—	—
Karl Pabst	Heer	Hauptmann	Chief of the 3./Pionier-Bataillon 296	19 December 1943	—	—
Kurt Pabst (Note: According to Deutsche Dienststelle (WASt) and Scherzer name is Kurt Papst who received the Knight's Cross of the Iron Cross as commander of Divisions-Füsilier-Bataillon 81.)	Heer	Hauptmann of the Reserves	Commander of Divisions-Füsilier-Bataillon (A.A.) 81	13 April 1944*	Missing in action 10 March 1944	—
Alois Pacher	Heer	Oberstleutnant	Commander of Grenadier-Regiment 222	5 March 1945	—	—
Gerhard Pade? (Note: No evidence of the award can be found in the German Federal Archives. Unlawful presentation of the Knight's Cross of the Iron Cross to Gerhard Pade by the commanding general of the I Parachute Corps General der Fallschirmtruppe Richard Heidrich.)	Luftwaffe	Major	Commander of the I./Fallschirmjäger-Regiment 4	30 April 1945	—	—
Arno Paege	Heer	Hauptmann of the Reserves	Chief of the 13.(IG)/Grenadier-Regiment 461 (Note: According to Scherzer as chief of the 13./Grenadier-Regiment 461.)	27 July 1944	—	—
Otto Paegelow	Heer	Unteroffizier	Group leader in the 2./Füsilier-Bataillon 719 (Note: According to Scherzer as group leader in the 2./Divisions-Füsilier-Bataillon 719.)	8 February 1945	—	—
Heinrich Paepcke+	Luftwaffe	Oberleutnant	Staffelkapitän of the 7./Kampfgeschwader 30	5 September 1940	Awarded 154th Oak Leaves 19 December 1942	
Heinz Paetow	Heer	Oberfeldwebel	Zugführer (platoon leader) in the 6./Grenadier-Regiment 132	17 December 1942	—	—
Otto Paetsch+	Waffen-SS	SS-Obersturmbannführer	Commander of SS-Panzer-Regiment 10 "Frundsberg" (Note: According to Scherzer as commander of SS-Panzer-Regiment 10.)	23 August 1944	Awarded 820th Oak Leaves 5 April 1945	
Erich Pätz	Luftwaffe	Oberfeldwebel	Pilot in the 7./Schlachtgeschwader 2 "Immelmann"	29 February 1944	—	—
Georg Pagel	Heer	Oberleutnant	Chief of schwere Panzer-Jäger-Kompanie 1558	28 March 1945	—	—
Karl Pakebusch (Note: According to Scherzer name is spelled Karl Packebusch who received the Knight's Cross of the Iron Cross on 24 April or 25 April 1945 as leader of Volkssturm-Bataillon 3-617 in Berlin-Wedding.)	Volkssturm	Bataillonsführer im Volkssturm (rank equivalent to Hauptmann)	Volkssturm Berlin-Wedding	27 April 1945	—	—
Harry Paletta	Waffen-SS	SS-Obersturmführer	Chief of the SS-Sturmgeschütz-Batterie 1007 "Prinz Eugen" (Note: According to Scherzer as chief of the SS-Sturmgeschütz-Batterie 1007.)	26 November 1944*	Killed in action 17 November 1944	—
Karl Palmgreen+	Kriegsmarine	Korvettenkapitän of the Reserves (Note: According to Scherzer as Korvettenkapitän zur Verwendung (for disposition).)	Commander of Sperrbrecher IX and I	3 August 1941	Awarded 523rd Oak Leaves 11 July 1944	—
Ferdinand Pampus	Heer	Oberleutnant	Chief of the 14./Infanterie-Regiment 6	16 February 1942*	Killed in action 13 February 1942	—
Alfred Pandel	Heer	Hauptmann (Note: According to Scherzer as Hauptmann of the Reserves.)	Leader of the I./Grenadier-Regiment 84	19 December 1943*	Killed in action 20 October 1943	—
Herbert Panknin	Kriegsmarine	Kapitänleutnant (Ing.)	Chief engineer on U-106	4 September 1943	—	—
Georg Pankow	Heer	Obergefreiter	Heavy machine gun leader in the 2./Grenadier-Regiment 338	31 March 1943	—	—
Dr. med. dent. Werner Pankow	Heer	Hauptmann of the Reserves	Leader of the II./Infanterie-Regiment 151	20 September 1941	—	—
Rudolf Pannier	Waffen-SS	Major of the Schupo	Commander of the I./SS-Polizei-Schützen-Regiment 2 (Note: According to Scherzer as commander of the I./Polizei-Schützen-Regiment 2.)	11 May 1942	—	Black-and-white portrait of a man in semi profile wearing a military uniform with an Iron Cross displayed at his neck.
Helmuth von Pannwitz+	Heer	Oberstleutnant	Commander of Aufklärungs-Abteilung 45	4 September 1941	Awarded 167th Oak Leaves 23 December 1942	
Werner Panse	Luftwaffe	Oberleutnant	Staffelführer of the 9./Schlachtgeschwader 1	4 May 1944	—	—
Kurt Pantel	Heer	Hauptmann	Chief of the 8.(MG)/Infanterie-Regiment 96 (Note: According to Scherzer as chief of the 8./Infanterie-Regiment 96.)	7 August 1942*	Died of wounds 23 May 1942	—
Dr. jur. Karl Pantzlaff	Heer	Major of the Reserves	Commander of the III./Panzer-Artillerie-Regiment 2	8 August 1943	—	—
Peter Panusch	Heer	Feldwebel	Zugführer (platoon leader) in the 1./Grenadier-Regiment 286	26 February 1945	—	—
Albert Panzenhagen	Heer	Oberstleutnant	Commander of Panzergrenadier-Regiment 361	2 October 1942	—	—
Fred Papas	Waffen-SS	SS-Untersturmführer	Company leader in the SS-Panzer-Aufklärungs-Abteilung 17 "Götz von Berlichingen" (Note: According to Scherzer as company leader in the SS-Panzer-Aufklärungs-Abteilung 17.)	27 December 1944	—	—
Günther Pape+	Heer	Major	Commander of Kradschützen-Bataillon 3	10 February 1942	Awarded 301st Oak Leaves 15 September 1943	Black-and-white portrait of a man wearing a military uniform with an Iron Cross displayed at his neck, his dark hair is combed back.
Kurt-Albert Pape	Luftwaffe	Hauptmann	Staffelkapitän of the 3./Sturzkampfgeschwader 5	20 June 1943	—	—
Walter Pape	Heer	Unteroffizier	Group leader in the 5./Infanterie-Regiment 211	7 March 1941	—	—
Werner Pape	Heer	Hauptmann	Commander of Feldersatz-Bataillon 158	5 March 1945	—	—
Josef Papesch	Heer	Feldwebel	Zugführer (platoon leader) of Radfahrzug (bicycle platoon) in Grenadier-Regiment 2	7 March 1944	—	—
Gerhard Papst	Heer	Rittmeister	Leader of Panzer-Aufklärungs-Abteilung 13	15 January 1945	—	—
Willi Pardon (Note: According to Scherzer name is spelled Wilhelm Pardon who received the Knight's Cross of the Iron Cross as Zugführer (platoon leader) in the 1./Aufklärungs-Ersatz-Abteilung 15 [Walküre-Einheit of Wehrkreis VI in the Division-Nr. 176].)	Heer	Wachtmeister	Zugführer (platoon leader) in the 1./Aufklärungs-Abteilung 15	9 December 1944	—	—
Heinrich Parisius	Luftwaffe	Feldwebel	Pilot in the 12.(H)/Aufklärungs-Gruppe 13 (Note: According to Scherzer as pilot in the Nahaufklärungsstaffel 12.(H)/13.)	18 November 1944	—	—
Werner Paschke	Heer	Oberleutnant of the Reserves	Chief of the 3./Grenadier-Regiment 161	19 August 1944	—	—
Heinrich Pasold	Heer	Oberleutnant of the Reserves	Chief of the 4./Gebirgsjäger-Regiment 13	10 September 1944	—	—
Hans Passegger	Heer	Unteroffizier	Telephone squad leader in the Nachrichtenstaffel (news or information squadron) II./Grenadier-Regiment 480	27 August 1943	—	—
Eberhard Pasternack	Heer	Oberleutnant of the Reserves	Leader of the 7./Infanterie-Regiment 506	22 September 1941	—	—
Arthur Pasternak	Heer	Oberleutnant of the Reserves	Chief of the 2./Pionier-Bataillon 8 (motorized) (Note: According to Scherzer as chief of the 2./Pionier-Bataillon 8.)	24 March 1943	—	—
Walter Patry	Luftwaffe	Feldwebel	Pilot in the 3.(F)/Aufklärungs-Gruppe 22 (Note: According to Scherzer as pilot in the Aufklärungsstaffel 3.(F)/22.)	28 February 1945*	Missing in action January 1945	—
Dr. Horst Patuschka	Luftwaffe	Hauptmann	Gruppenkommandeur of the II./Nachtjagdgeschwader 2	10 May 1943*	Killed in action 6 March 1943	—
Ernst Paukner	Heer	Hauptmann of the Reserves	Tasked with the leadership of the II./Grenadier-Regiment 407 (Note: According to Scherzer as leader of the II./Grenadier-Regiment 407.)	18 July 1944	—	—
Friedrich-Karl Paul	Kriegsmarine	Korvettenkapitän	Chief of the 2. Torpedobootflottille	4 March 1945	—	—
Hugo Paul	Luftwaffe	Hauptmann	Leader of Fallschirmjäger-Bataillon Paul (Note: According to Scherzer as leader of Fallschirmjäger-Bataillon Paul (under control of the 334. Infanterie-Division).)	18 November 1944	—	—
Karl Paul	Heer	Hauptmann of the Reserves	Leader of I./Grenadier-Regiment 1073	20 October 1944*	Killed in action 3 September 1944	—
Wilhelm Paul	Heer	Unteroffizier	In the Kampfgruppe Wach-Regiment "Großdeutschland" in the fortress Berlin	25 April 1945 (Note: Scherzer assumes that the presentation was made on 24 April 1945.)	—	—
[Dr.] Rolf Pauls (Note: The brackets around the doctor title [Dr.] denote that the academic title was attained after the Knight's Cross of the Iron Cross was awarded.)	Heer	Major im Generalstab (in the General Staff)	Ia (operation officer) of the 363. Volksgrenadier-Division	18 November 1944	—	
Werner Pauls	Heer	Oberleutnant (Note: According to Scherzer as Oberleutnant of the Reserves.)	Chief of the 9./Infanterie-Regiment 45	23 November 1941	—	—
Karl-August Paulsen	Luftwaffe	Oberleutnant	Staffelkapitän of the 9./Kampfgeschwader 30	29 February 1944	—	—
Friedrich Paulus+	Heer	General der Panzertruppe	Commander-in-chief of the 6. Armee	26 August 1942	Awarded 178th Oak Leaves 15 January 1943	Black-and-white portrait of a man in semi profile wearing a military uniform with an Iron Cross displayed at his neck.
Dr. rer. pol. Walter Walter Paulus	Heer	Leutnant of the Reserves	Leader of the 3./Panzer-Jäger-Abteilung 263	31 March 1942	—	—
Heinz Paulussen	Heer	Hauptmann	Leader of Panzer-Aufklärungs-Abteilung 18	18 September 1943*	Killed in action 7 September 1943	—
Joseph Pausinger	Heer	Oberstleutnant of the Reserves	Commander of Infanterie-Regiment 339	16 February 1942	—	—
Wilhelm Peek	Heer	Major	Commander of the II./Grenadier-Regiment 953	4 October 1944	—	—
Adolf Peichl	Waffen-SS	SS-Hauptscharführer	Zugführer (platoon leader) in the 12.(gepanzert)/SS-Panzergrenadier-Regiment 4 "Der Führer" (Note: According to Scherzer as Zugführer (platoon leader) in the 12.(gepanzert)/SS-Panzergrenadier-Regiment 4.)	16 October 1944	—	—
Friedrich Pein	Heer	Oberjäger	Sniper in the 2./Jäger-Regiment 227	28 February 1945	—	—
Joachim Peiper+	Waffen-SS	SS-Sturmbannführer	Commander of the III.(gepanzert)/SS-Panzergrenadier-Regiment 2 "Leibstandarte SS Adolf Hitler" (Note: According to Scherzer as commander of the III.(gepanzert)/2. Panzergrenadier-Regiment "Leibstandarte SS Adolf Hitler".)	9 March 1943	Awarded 377th Oak Leaves 27 January 1944; 119th Swords 11 January 1945	A man wearing a military uniform, peaked cap and a neck order in the shape of a cross. His cap has an emblem in shape of a human skull and crossed bones.
Herbert Peitsch	Luftwaffe	Gefreiter	Rifle grenade launcher in the 7./Fallschirmjäger-Regiment 6 (Note: According to Scherzer as shooter in the 7./Fallschirmjäger-Regiment 6.)	29 October 1944*	Died of wounds 30 July 1944	—
Wolfdietrich Peitsmeyer	Luftwaffe	Oberleutnant	Staffelkapitän of the 6.(S)/Lehrgeschwader 2	21 July 1940	—	—
Dietrich Pekrun	Luftwaffe	Oberleutnant	Pilot and adjutant in the I./Sturzkampfgeschwader 2 "Immelmann"	22 June 1941 (Note: According to Scherzer on 24 June 1941.)	—	—
Richard Pellengahr	Heer	Generalleutnant (Note: According to Scherzer as Generalleutnant (chargiert—brevet).)	Commander of the 196. Infanterie-Division	9 May 1940	—	—
Dietrich Peltz+	Luftwaffe	Oberleutnant	Staffelkapitän of the 1./Sturzkampfgeschwader 3	14 October 1940	Awarded 46th Oak Leaves 31 December 1941; 31st Swords 23 July 1943	—
Erich Pelz	Heer	Oberfeldwebel	Zugführer (platoon leader) in the 5./Panzergrenadier-Regiment 10	6 October 1944	—	—
Jakob Pelzer	Heer	Gefreiter	In the 1./Infanterie-Regiment 61	15 January 1942	—	—
Max-Josef Pemsel	Heer	Generalmajor	Commander of the 6. Gebirgs-Division	9 December 1944	—	
Oskar Penkert	Heer	Feldwebel	Zugführer (platoon leader) in the 3./Panzergrenadier-Regiment 108	23 February 1944	—	—
Paul Penth	Heer	Major of the Reserves	Commander of Pionier-Regiment-Stab 677	14 May 1944	—	—
Hans Pentzien	Luftwaffe	Hauptmann of the Reserves (Note: According to Scherzre as Hauptmann and Staffelkapitän of the Aufklärungsstaffel 1.(F)/124.)	Staffelkapitän of the 1.(F)/Aufklärungs-Gruppe 124	2 February 1945	—	—
Werner Pergande	Heer	Leutnant	Company leader in Grenadier-Regiment 108	22 November 1943	—	—
Joachim Persson	Heer	Oberleutnant of the Reserves	Chief of the 14.(Panzerjäger)/Grenadier-Regiment 501 (Note: According to Scherzer as chief of the 14./Grenadier-Regiment 501.)	26 March 1944*	Died of wounds 25 February 1944	—
Erwin Pesch	Heer	Hauptmann	Leader of the I./Grenadier-Regiment 239	30 July 1943	—	—
Georg Peschel? (Note: No evidence of the award can be found in the German Federal Archives. Georg Peschel is listed in the first and second edition of Gerhard von Seemen's "Die Ritterkreuzträger 1939-1945—The Knight's Cross Bearers", however with a presentation date 15 March 1945. The 2nd edition explicitly states that there is no evidence in the German Federal Archives. Walther-Peer Fellgiebel comments about Peschel in his book: "Knight's Cross of the Iron Cross recipients exist, who do not have official evidence in the National Archives, but are members of the Bundeswehr and claimed to be Knight's Cross recipients. This claim in some cases was investigated by the Militärischer Abschirmdienst (MAD—Military Counterintelligence Service ) and accepted." Nothing can be found in the files of the Order Commission of the Association of Knight's Cross Recipients (AKCR) regarding Peschel. The presentation date was assigned by Fellgiebel.)	Heer	Oberfeldwebel	Zugführer (platoon leader) in the 10./Jäger-Regiment 49	11 May 1945	—	—
Rudolf Peschel	Heer	Generalleutnant	Commander of the 6. Luftwaffen-Feld-Division (Note: According to Scherzer as commander of the 6. Feld-Division (L).)	20 January 1944	—	—
Gustav Peschke	Heer	Major	Commander of the II./Panzergrenadier-Regiment 394	15 January 1944*	Died of wounds 10 December 1943	—
Otto Peschke	Heer	Unteroffizier	Company troop leader in the 2./Grenadier-Regiment 132	5 March 1945	—	—
Hans-Gotthard Pestke+	Heer	Oberleutnant	Chief of the 3./Infanterie-Regiment 176	15 November 1941	Awarded 311th Oak Leaves 14 October 1943	—
Ernst Pete-Nemeth	Heer	Unteroffizier	Messenger squadron leader in the II./Grenadier-Regiment 401	17 March 1945	—	—
Josef Peteani	Luftwaffe	Oberleutnant	Pilot in the 7./Lehrgeschwader 2 (Note: According to Scherzer as pilot in the 7.(H)/Lehrgeschwader 2.)	21 October 1942*	Killed in action 4 September 1942	—
Erich Peter	Luftwaffe	Unteroffizier	Pilot in the Stabsstaffel/Sturzkampfgeschwader 2 "Immelmann"	22 July 1943	—	—
Gerhard Peter	Heer	Oberleutnant	Chief of the 3./Panzer-Pionier-Bataillon 16	15 November 1941	—	—
Rudolf Peter	Heer	Obergefreiter	Group leader in the 2./Grenadier-Regiment 307	16 November 1944	—	—
Wilhelm Ritter und Edler von Peter	Heer	Major	Commander of the I./Panzer-Regiment 36	15 July 1941	—	—
Hans Peterburs	Luftwaffe	Oberfeldwebel	Pilot in the II./Schlachtgeschwader 4 (Note: According to Scherzer as pilot in the II./Zerstörergeschwader 1.)	25 November 1942	—	—
Max-Eugen Petereit	Heer	Oberleutnant of the Reserves	Leader of the 3./Artillerie-Regiment 240	7 October 1942*	Killed in action 29 September 1942	—
Horst-Egon Peterhänsel	Heer	Major	Commander of the I./Grenadier-Regiment 272	6 April 1944	—	—
Erich Petermann	Heer	Oberfeldwebel	Zugführer (platoon leader) in the 4./Kradschützen-Bataillon 64	17 August 1942	—	—
Viktor Petermann	Luftwaffe	Leutnant	Pilot in the III./Jagdgeschwader 52 (Note: According to Scherzer as pilot in the 6./Jagdgeschwader 52.)	29 February 1944	—	—
Alfred Peters	Heer	Oberfeldwebel	Zugführer (platoon leader) in the 14.(Panzerjäger)/Grenadier-Regiment 348 (Note: According to Scherzer as Zugführer (platoon leader) in the 14./Grenadier-Regiment 348.)	3 August 1944	—	—
Josef Peters	Luftwaffe	Oberleutnant	Observer in the 12./Kampfgeschwader 26 (Note: According to Scherzer as observer in the III./Kampfgeschwader 26.)	6 April 1944	—	—
Karl Peters	Luftwaffe	Hauptmann	Gruppenkommandeur of the II.(Kampf)/Lehrgeschwader 1	April 1945 (Note: According to Scherzer on 30 April 1945.)	—	—
Kurd Peters	Luftwaffe	Major	Gruppenkommandeur of the II.(Sturm)/Jagdgeschwader 300 (Note: According to Scherzer as Gruppenkommandeur of the II./Jagdgeschwader 300.)	29 October 1944	—	—
Reinhard Peters	Heer	Leutnant of the Reserves	Leader of the 4./Panzer-Regiment 35	29 February 1944	—	—
Werner Peters	Heer	Oberleutnant of the Reserves	Leader of the II./Grenadier-Regiment 587	16 November 1943	—	—
Horst von Petersdorff	Heer	Hauptmann zur Verwendung (for disposition)	Commander of the III./Infanterie-Regiment 189	29 June 1940	—	—
Manfred von Petersdorff	Heer	Major	Commander of the I./Infanterie-Regiment 529	9 January 1942	—	—
Carl-August Petersen	Luftwaffe	Hauptmann	Staffelkapitän of the 9./Kampfgeschwader 27 "Boelcke"	7 March 1942	—	—
Edgar Petersen	Luftwaffe	Major	Gruppenkommandeur of the I./Kampfgeschwader 40	21 October 1940	—	Black-and-white portrait of a man wearing a military uniform with an Iron Cross displayed at his neck.
Fritz Petersen+	Luftwaffe	Wachtmeister	Gun leader in the 6./Flak-Regiment 4 (motorized) (Note: According to Scherzer as gun leader in the 6./Flak-Regiment 4.)	16 November 1942	Awarded 438th Oak Leaves 26 March 1944	—
Heinrich Petersen	Kriegsmarine	Stabsobersteuermann	Watch officer and coxswain on U-99	5 November 1940	—	—
Heinrich Petersen	Heer	Hauptmann	Commander of the I./Infanterie-Regiment 184	6 February 1942	—	—
Heinrich Petersen	Waffen-SS	SS-Obersturmbannführer	Commander of SS-Gebirgsjäger-Regiment 1 "Prinz Eugen"	13 November 1943	—	—
Otto Petersen	Waffen-SS	SS-Hauptsturmführer	Commander of the II./SS-Freiwilligen-Panzergrenadier-Regiment 49 "De Ruyter" (Note: According to Scherzer as commander of the II./SS-Freiwilligen-Panzergrenadier-Regiment 49 "De Ruiter" (niederl. Nr. 2).)	11 December 1944	—	—
Rudolf Petersen+	Kriegsmarine	Korvettenkapitän	Chief of the 2. Schnellbootsflottille	4 August 1940	Awarded 499th Oak Leaves 13 June 1944	—
Rudolf Petershagen	Heer	Oberstleutnant	Commander of the II./Infanterie-Regiment 92 (motorized)	20 July 1942	—	—
Georg Peterson	Heer	Hauptmann of the Reserves	Leader of Artillerie-Abteilung 929 (Note: According to Scherzer as eader of schwere Artillerie-Abteilung (partially improvised motorized) 929.)	27 August 1944	—	—
Ernst Petzold	Luftwaffe	Oberleutnant	Pilot in the 5./Kampfgeschwader 54	17 September 1941	—	—
Joachim Petzold	Luftwaffe	Hauptmann	Gruppenkommandeur of the I./Kampfgeschwader 27 "Boelcke"	18 May 1943	—	—
Armin Pfaffendorf	Luftwaffe	Oberleutnant	Pilot in the 1.(H)/Aufklärungs-Gruppe 13 (Note: According to Scherzer as pilot in the Aufklärungsstaffel 1.(H)/13.)	22 May 1942	—	—
Oskar Pfalzgraf	Heer	Unteroffizier	Zugführer (platoon leader) in the 5./Infanterie-Regiment 695	7 October 1942	—	—
Karl Pfannkuche	Heer	Major	Commander of the II./Panzer-Regiment 33	17 March 1945	—	—
Josef Pfattischer	Heer	Unteroffizier	Group leader in the 8./Grenadier-Regiment 61	4 October 1944	—	—
Otto Pfau	Heer	Hauptmann	Leader of the I./Panzergrenadier-Regiment "Großdeutschland"	23 March 1945	—	—
Max Pfeffer	Heer	Generalleutnant	Commander of the 297. Infanterie-Division	4 December 1941	—	—
Karl Pfeffer-Wildenbruch+	Waffen-SS	SS-Obergruppenführer and General of the Waffen-SS (Note: According to Scherzer as SS-Obergruppenführer and General of the Police and Waffen-SS and commanding general of the IX. Waffen-Gebirgs-Armeekorps of the SS.)	Commanding general of the IX. SS-Gebirgskorps	11 January 1945	Awarded 723rd Oak Leaves 1 February 1945	A man wearing a military uniform.
Hellmuth Pfeifer+	Heer	Oberstleutnant	Commander of Infanterie-Regiment 185	26 November 1941	Awarded 574th Oak Leaves 5 September 1944	—
Franz Pfeiffer	Heer	Hauptmann	Chief of the 15./Gebirgsjäger-Regiment 100	13 June 1941	—	—
Dr. Georg Pfeiffer	Heer	Generalleutnant	Commander of the 94. Infanterie-Division	15 January 1943	—	
Hans Pfeiffer	Heer	Leutnant of the Reserves	Leader of the 2./Pionier-Bataillon 97	26 January 1942	—	—
Hellmut Pfeiffer	Heer	Hauptmann	Commander in the II./Infanterie-Regiment 671	19 September 1942	—	—
Horst Pfeiffer	Heer	Oberleutnant	Leader of the I./Grenadier-Regiment 755	12 January 1945	—	—
Johannes Pfeiffer	Luftwaffe	Oberleutnant	Staffelkapitän of the 12.(Stuka)/Lehrgeschwader 1	10 October 1941	—	A man wearing a military uniform.
Karl Pfeiffer	Heer	Oberleutnant	Deputy leader of the I./Grenadier-Regiment 435 (Note: According to Scherzer as leader of the I./Grenadier-Regiment 435.)	15 March 1944	—	—
Johann Pfeil	Heer	Hauptmann	Commander of the I./Grenadier-Regiment 80	29 February 1944*	Killed in action 13 February 1944	—
Herbert Pfenning	Heer	Leutnant of the Reserves	Zugführer (platoon leader) in the 4./Panzergrenadier-Regiment 25	21 September 1944	—	—
Arno Pfeuffer	Heer	Rittmeister	Commander of Aufklärungs-Abteilung 332	7 August 1943	—	—
Werner Pfitzer	Heer	Leutnant	Shock troops leader in the 3./Schützen-Regiment 113	19 July 1941	—	—
Heinz Pfitzner	Heer	Oberleutnant of the Reserves	Chief of the 2./Pionier-Bataillon 290	15 January 1943	—	—
Paul Pfizenmayer	Heer	Hauptmann of the Reserves	Chief of the 3./Artillerie-Regiment 215	3 November 1944	—	—
Rudolf Pflanz	Luftwaffe	Oberleutnant	Pilot in the 1./Jagdgeschwader 2 "Richthofen" (Note: According to Scherzer as pilot in the Stab/Jagdgeschwader 2 "Richthofen".)	1 August 1941	—	
Kurt Pflieger	Heer	Generalleutnant	Commander of the 416. Infanterie-Division	10 February 1945	—	—
Johann Pflugbeil	Heer	Generalleutnant	Commander of Mitau (Latvia) (Note: According to Scherzer as commander of the Feld-Ausbildungs-Division Nord and combat commander of Mitau.)	12 August 1944	—	—
Kurt Pflugbeil+	Luftwaffe	Generalleutnant	Commanding general of the IV. Fliegerkorps	5 October 1941	Awarded 562nd Oak Leaves 27 August 1944	—
Helmut Pförtner	Waffen-SS	SS-Untersturmführer of the Reserves	Leader of the 6./SS-Regiment "Germania" (Note: According to Scherzer as Zugführer (platoon leader) in the 2./SS-Regiment "Germania".)	18 January 1942	—	—
Karl Pfreudtner	Heer	Oberwachtmeister	Zugführer (platoon leader) in the 2./Sturmgeschütz-Abteilung 244	10 September 1942	—	—
Heinz Pfühl	Heer	Wachtmeister of the Reserves (Note: According to Scherzer as Wachtmeister and squadron troop leader in the 3./Divisions-Füsilier-Bataillon (A.A.) 362.)	Squadron troop leader in the 3./Divisions-Füsilier-Bataillon 362	5 February 1945	—	—
Alexander von Pfuhlstein	Heer	Oberst	Commander of Infanterie-Regiment 154	17 August 1942	—	—
Christian Philipp	Heer	Generalleutnant	Commander of the 8. Jäger-Division	11 March 1945	—	A man wearing a military uniform with various military decorations.
Ernst Philipp+	Heer	Oberleutnant	Chief of the 4./Panzer-Regiment 1	28 November 1940	Awarded 599th Oak Leaves 30 September 1944	—
Hans Philipp+	Luftwaffe	Oberleutnant	Staffelkapitän of the 4./Jagdgeschwader 54	22 October 1940	Awarded 33rd Oak Leaves 24 August 1941; 8th Swords 12 March 1942	—
Hans-Otto Philipp	Kriegsmarine	Korvettenkapitän of the Reserves	Chief of the 1. Küstensicherungsverband	31 December 1944	—	—
Wilhelm Philipp	Luftwaffe	Oberfeldwebel	Pilot in the 3./Jagdgeschwader 54 (Note: According to Scherzer as pilot in the I./Jagdgeschwader 54.)	26 March 1944	—	—
Alfred Philippi	Heer	Oberst	Commander of Grenadier-Regiment 535	14 May 1944	—	—
Karl Philippi	Heer	Oberst	Commander of Infanterie-Regiment 207	2 November 1941*	Killed in action 30 October 1941	—
Karl Philipps	Heer	Oberleutnant	Chief of the 5./Panzergrenadier-Lehr-Regiment 901	7 April 1944	—	—
Dipl.-Ing. Wilhelm Philipps	Heer	Generalleutnant	Commander of the 3. Panzer-Division	5 March 1945	—	—
Arthur Phleps+	Waffen-SS	SS-Gruppenführer and Generalleutnant of the Waffen-SS	Commander of SS-Division "Prinz Eugen" (Note: According to Scherzer as commander of SS-Freiwilligen-Gebirgs-Division "Prinz Eugen".)	4 July 1943	Awarded 670th Oak Leaves 24 November 1944	
Harry Phönix	Waffen-SS	SS-Hauptsturmführer	Commander of the II./SS-Artillerie-Regiment 8 "Florian Geyer" (Note: According to Scherzer as commander of the II./SS-Artillerie-Regiment 8.)	21 February 1945	—	—
Johann Pichler	Luftwaffe	Fahnenjunker-Oberfeldwebel (Note: According to Scherzer as Oberfeldwebel who received the Knight's Cross of the Iron Cross as pilot in the III./Jagdgeschwader 77.)	Pilot in the 7./Jagdgeschwader 77	19 August 1944	—	—
Alfred Picht	Heer	Major of the Reserves	Commander of the III./Panzer-Artillerie-Regiment 78	9 December 1944	—	—
Gerhard Pick+	Heer	Hauptmann	Commander of the II./Infanterie-Regiment 490 (Note: According to Scherzer as leader of II./Infanterie-Regiment 490.)	2 November 1941	Awarded 553rd Oak Leaves 19 August 1944	—
Egbert Picker	Heer	Oberst	Commander of Gebirgsjäger-Regiment 98	18 November 1941	—	—
Wolfgang Pickert+	Luftwaffe	Generalmajor	Commander of the 9. Flak-Division (motorized) (Note: According to Scherzer as commander of the 9. Flak-Division.)	11 January 1943	Awarded 489th Oak Leaves 5 June 1944	—
Karl Picus	Waffen-SS	SS-Obersturmführer (Note: According to Scherzer as SS-Obersturmführer of the Reserves who received the Knight's Cross of the Iron Cross in SS-Panzer-Regiment 5.)	In SS-Panzer-Regiment 5 "Wiking"	17 April 1945	—	—
Alois Piechulla	Heer	Gefreiter	Machine gunner in the 2./Panzergrenadier-Regiment 33	11 April 1943 (Note: According to Scherzer on 14 April 1944.)	—	—
Friedrich Piefer	Heer	Fahnenjunker-Oberfeldwebel	Deputy leader in the 2./Grenadier-Regiment 464 (Note: According to Scherzer as leader in the 2./Grenadier-Regiment 464.)	2 September 1944	—	—
Franz Piehler	Heer	Hauptmann	Commander of the I./Jäger-Regiment 25 (L)	6 October 1944	—	—
Heinz Piekenbrock	Heer	Generalmajor	Commander of the 208. Infanterie-Division	4 May 1944	—	—
Hans Pielmeier	Luftwaffe	Hauptmann	Deputy commander of leichte Flak-Abteilung 89 (motorized) (Note: According to Scherzer as leader of leichte Flak-Abteilung (motorized) 89.)	20 July 1944	—	—
Adolf Piening	Kriegsmarine	Kapitänleutnant	Commander of U-155	13 August 1942	—	—
Claus Pieper	Heer	Oberleutnant of the Reserves	Leader of the 2./Panzer-Jäger-Abteilung 161	24 February 1945	—	—
Heinz Pieper	Heer	Oberfeldwebel	Zugführer (platoon leader) in the Grenadier-Regiment 230	20 January 1943*	Killed in action 16 January 1943	—
Heinz Pieper	Heer	Unteroffizier	Gun leader in the 1./Panzer-Jäger-Abteilung 19 (Note: According to Scherzer as gun leader in the 1.(self motorized)/Panzer-Jäger-Abteilung 19.)	17 September 1943*	Died of wounds 7 September 1943	—
Willi Pieper	Heer	Sanitätsunteroffizier	In the Stabskompanie(Pionierzug)/Grenadier-Regiment 478 (Note: According to Scherzer in the Regiments-Pionierzug/Grenadier-Regiment 478.)	8 April 1943	—	—
Werner Pietsch	Heer	Hauptmann of the Reserves	Chief of the 6./Panzer-Regiment 39	16 November 1943	—	—
August Pietschmann	Heer	Oberwachtmeister of the Reserves (Note: According to Scherzer as Oberwachtmeister.)	Nachrichtenstaffelführer (news or information squadron leader) in the 8./Artillerie-Regiment 24	20 October 1944	—	—
Karl Pietschmann (Note: According to Scherzer name is spelled Karl Pitschmann who received the Knight's Cross of the Iron Cross as leader of the regimental pioneer platoon in Grenadier-Regiment 57.)	Heer	Feldwebel	Zugführer (platoon leader) in the Stabskompanie/Grenadier-Regiment 57	9 June 1944*	Killed in action 19 March 1944	—
Erich Pietzonka+	Luftwaffe	Oberstleutnant	Commander of Fallschirmjäger-Regiment 7	5 September 1944	Awarded 584th Oak Leaves 16 September 1944	A man wearing a military uniform with an Iron Cross displayed at the front of his uniform collar.
Anton-Rudolf Piffer	Luftwaffe	Oberfeldwebel (Note: According to Scherzer as Leutnant (war officer) who received the Knight's Cross of the Iron Cross as Staffelführer of the 1./Jagdgeschwader 1 "Oesau".)	Staffelführer of the 2./Jagdgeschwader 1 "Oesau"	20 October 1944*	Killed in action 17 June 1944	—
Hans Pikrot	Heer	Leutnant	Leader of the 2./Pionier-Bataillon 158	2 September 1944	—	—
Hubert Pilarski+	Heer	Oberfeldwebel	Zugführer (platoon leader) in the 8.(MG)/Grenadier-Regiment 511 (Note: According to Scherzer as Zugführer (platoon leader) in the 8./Grenadier-Regiment 511.)	4 August 1943	Awarded 493rd Oak Leaves 9 June 1944	—
Karl Pilat	Heer	Major	Commander of the III./Grenadier-Regiment 53 (Note: According to Scherzer as commander of the II./Grenadier-Regiment 53.)	14 November 1943	—	—
Walter Pilz	Luftwaffe	Feldwebel	Pilot in the 5./Kampfgeschwader 55	24 March 1943	—	—
Rolf Pingel	Luftwaffe	Hauptmann	Gruppenkommandeur of the I./Jagdgeschwader 26 "Schlageter"	14 September 1940	—	
Georg Pinkepank	Kriegsmarine	Korvettenkapitän	Chief of the 2. Räumbootflottille	12 August 1944	—	—
Johannes Pintschovius	Heer	Hauptmann	Commander of the III./Infanterie-Regiment 202	5 May 1942	—	—
Artur Pipan	Luftwaffe	Oberleutnant	Staffelkapitän of the 5./Sturzkampfgeschwader 1 (Note: According to Scherzer as Staffelkapitän in the II./Sturzkampfgeschwader 1.)	6 April 1944	—	—
Wilhelm Pirch	Heer	Hauptmann	Leader of Panzer-Aufklärungs-Abteilung 11	13 September 1943	—	—
Ernst Pirhofer	Luftwaffe	Obergefreiter	Richtkanonier (gunner) in the 7./Flak-Regiment 43 (motorized) (Note: According to Scherzer as Richtkanonier (gunner) in the 7./Flak-Regiment 43.)	4 May 1944	—	—
Karl Pirner	Heer	Feldwebel	Zugführer (platoon leader) in the 10./Grenadier-Regiment 520	21 May 1943*	Killed in action 13 March 1943	—
[Dr.] Herbert Piske	Luftwaffe	Oberleutnant	Staffelkapitän of the 3./Schlachtgeschwader 10	15 March 1945	—	—
Walter Pitsch? (Note: No evidence of the award can be found in the German Federal Archives. According to Walther-Peer Fellgiebel the award was presumably awarded by SS-Oberstgruppenführer Sepp Dietrich, which would make it unlawful. Fellgiebel names Hermann Buch, the former IIa (personnel administration) of the 2. SS-Division "Das Reich", and Wilhelm Kment, the adjutant of Heinrich Himmler and liaison officer to the Heerespersonalamt (HPA—Army Staff Office), as sources. Buch stated on 25 June 2006 that he has nothing to do with this presentation. Walter Pitsch is mentioned the first in Ernst-Günther Krätschmer's 2nd edition of "Die Ritterkreuzträger der Waffen-SS—The Knight's Cross Bearers of the Waffen-SS". The Association of Knight's Cross Recipients (AKCR) initially did not accept Pitsch as a recipient since he was not listed in Gerhard von Seemen's 2nd edition of "Die Ritterkreuzträger 1939–1945—The Knight's Cross Bearers 1939–1945". The order commission of the AKCR processed the case in 1977 and decided: "Knight's Cross yes, 3 May 1945". The presentation date was later changed by Fellgiebel to 6 May 1945. Krätschmer who does not present a source for Pritsch’s listing also states 6 May 1945. Unfortunately Pritsch, a member of the AKCR, did not help clarify the situation. He twice, on 24 July 2004 and 22 July 2004, did not respond to a request from the president of the AKCR.)	Waffen-SS	SS-Hauptscharführer	Zugführer (platoon leader) in the 4./SS-Flak-Abteilung 1 "Leibstandarte SS Adolf Hitler"	6 May 1945	—	—
Adolf Pittschellis	Waffen-SS	SS-Sturmbannführer	Commander of SS-Panzer-Jäger-Abteilung 3 "Totenkopf" (Note: According to Scherzer as commander of SS-Panzer-Jäger-Abteilung 3.)	23 August 1944	—	—
Josef Pizala	Luftwaffe	Hauptmann	Chief of the 2./Flak-Regiment 111 (motorized) (Note: According to Scherzer as chief of the 2./Flak-Regiment 111.)	17 October 1941*	Died of wounds 14 October 1941	—
Franz Placzek	Luftwaffe	Oberfeldwebel	Observer in the 2./Kampfgeschwader 55	3 April 1943	—	—
Max Edler von der Planitz	Heer	Major of the Reserves	Leader of Panzer-Jäger-Abteilung 161	14 February 1945	—	—
Albert Plapper	Luftwaffe	Gefreiter	Group leader in the 4./Fallschirm-Panzergrenadier-Regiment 2 "Hermann Göring"	30 November 1944	—	—
Anton-Detlev von Plato	Heer	Oberstleutnant im Generalstab (in the General Staff)	Ia (operations officer) in the 5. Panzer-Division	19 August 1944	—	—
Reinhold Platta	Heer	Obergefreiter	Machine gunner in the 1./Grenadier-Regiment 309	12 December 1944	—	—
Hubert Platz? (Note: Hubert Platz's nomination for the Knight's Cross of the Iron Cross by his corps was never forwarded or was lost due to the military situation. A second nomination was made after the evacuation of East Prussia, after the German capitulation. This nomination was never processed. The order commission of the Association of Knight's Cross Recipients (AKCR) processed the case in 1982 and decided: "Knight's Cross yes, 9 May 1945". The presentation date was later changed by Fellgiebel to 11 May 1945.)	Heer	Major	Commander Panzer-Artillerie-Regiment 89	11 May 1945	—	—
Friedrich Platzer	Luftwaffe	Oberleutnant	Staffelführer of the 3./Sturzkampfgeschwader 2 "Immelmann" (Note: According to Scherzer as Staffelkapitän of the 3./Sturzkampfgeschwader 2 "Immelmann".)	5 April 1942*	Killed in flying accident 16 March 1942	—
Josef Plein	Heer	Obergefreiter	Group leader in the 6./Grenadier-Regiment 545	14 April 1945	—	—
Gerhard Pleiss	Waffen-SS	SS-Obersturmführer	Chief of the 1./"Leibstandarte SS Adolf Hitler" (motorized)	20 April 1941	—	A man in semi profile standing in front of a tree and wearing a military uniform, peaked cap and a neck order in the shape of a cross. His cap has an emblem in shape of a human skull and crossed bones.
Kurt Plenzat+	Luftwaffe	Oberfeldwebel	Pilot in the 2./Sturzkampfgeschwader 2 "Immelmann"	19 September 1943	Awarded 712th Oak Leaves 24 January 1945	—
Hans Plesch	Heer	Leutnant of the Reserves	Leader of the 12./Infanterie-Regiment 6	21 March 1942	—	—
Helmut Pleß	Luftwaffe	Leutnant	Pilot in the 4.(H)/Aufklärungs-Gruppe 31 (Note: According to Scherzer as pilot in the Nahaufklärungsstaffel 4.(H)/31.)	9 June 1944	—	—
Georg Graf von Plettenberg+	Heer	Rittmeister	Commander of schwere Kavallerie-Abteilung 4	12 August 1944	Awarded 730th Oak Leaves 5 February 1945	—
Erich Plettner	Heer	Hauptmann of the Reserves	Leader of the I./Grenadier-Regiment 507	1 January 1944	—	Black-and-white portrait of a man wearing a steel helmet, military uniform with an Iron Cross displayed at his neck.
Waldemar Plewig	Luftwaffe	Hauptmann	Gruppenkommandeur of the II./Sturzkampfgeschwader 77	14 December 1940	—	—
Fritz Plickat	Heer	Feldwebel	Zugführer (platoon leader) in the 8./Panzer-Regiment "Großdeutschland"	9 December 1944	—	—
Peter-Paul Plinzner	Heer	Oberleutnant	Chief of the 5./Panzer-Regiment 27	20 October 1941*	Died of wounds 17 October 1941	—
Fritz Pliska	Heer	Oberfeldwebel	Zugführer (platoon leader) in the 3./Panzer-Pionier-Bataillon 19	26 March 1944	—	A man wearing a jacket, checkered shirt and tie.
Hermann Plocher+	Luftwaffe	Generalmajor	Chief of the Generalstab Luftflotte 3 (Note: According to Scherzer as commander of the 4. Flieger Division.)	22 November 1943	Awarded (867th) Oak Leaves 8 May 1945? (Note: Hermann Plocher's nomination had been finalized by the Heerespersonalamt (HPA—Army Staff Office) and was ready for signature by the end of the war. According to the Association of Knight's Cross Recipients (AKCR) the award was present in accordance with the Dönitz-decree. This is illegal according to the Deutsche Dienststelle (WASt) and lacks legal justification. The presentation date was assigned by Fellgiebel. Plocher was a member of the AKCR.)	—
Karl-Heinrich Plöger	Heer	Oberleutnant	Chief of the 6./Panzergrenadier-Regiment 14	23 March 1945	—	—
Werner Plöntzke	Heer	Gefreiter	Machine gunner in the 5./Panzergrenadier-Regiment 103	4 July 1944	—	—
Friedrich-Hans Plümer	Heer	Hauptmann (Note: Scherzer does not state a rank.)	Commander of the I./Grenadier-Regiment 268	28 January 1943	—	—
Karl-August Pochat	Heer	Oberstleutnant	Commander of Aufklärungs-Abteilung 29 (Note: According to Scherzer as commander of Aufklärungs-Abteilung (motorized) 29.)	5 August 1940	—	—
Erich Podehl	Heer	Oberfeldwebel	Zugführer (platoon leader) in the Panzer-Jäger-Abteilung 349	5 April 1945	—	—
Reinhold Podrasa	Heer	Unteroffizier	Zugführer (platoon leader) in the 3./Grenadier-Regiment 551 (Note: According to Scherzer as leader of the 3./Grenadier-Regiment 551.)	31 January 1945	—	—
Heinz Pöhler	Heer	Oberfeldwebel	Zugführer (platoon leader) in the 1./Grenadier-Regiment 32	2 September 1944	—	—
Hermann Poehlmann	Luftwaffe	Hauptmann	Commander of the I./Flak-Regiment 33	11 February 1945	—	—
Georg Pöhner	Heer	Unteroffizier	Company troop leader in the 6./Panzergrenadier-Regiment 33	21 September 1944	—	—
Josef Pöhs	Luftwaffe	Leutnant of the Reserves (Note: According to Scherzer as Leutnant (war officer) and pilot in the II./Jagdgeschwader 54.)	Pilot in the 5./Jagdgeschwader 54	6 August 1941	—	
Gerhard Poel	Heer	Generalmajor	Oberfeldkommandantur 400 and commander of Wilna	16 October 1944	—	—
Gustav Poel	Kriegsmarine	Kapitänleutnant	Commander of U-413	21 March 1944	—	—
Konrad Pöllath	Luftwaffe	Oberfeldwebel	Pilot in the 2.(H)/Aufklärungs-Gruppe 12 (Note: According to Scherzer as pilot in the 2./Nahaufklärungsgruppe 12.)	14 January 1945	—	—
Hubert Pölz+	Luftwaffe	Leutnant of the Reserves (Note: According to Scherzer as Leutnant (war officer).)	Staffelführer of the 7./Sturzkampfgeschwader 3	5 February 1944	Awarded 661st Oak Leaves 25 November 1944	—
Julius Pöppel	Heer	Wachtmeister	Zugführer (platoon leader) in the 5./Panzergrenadier-Regiment 26	31 December 1944	—	—
Fritz Poerschke	Heer	Hauptmann of the Reserves	Leader of the III./Infanterie-Regiment 446	26 August 1942	—	—
Johannes Pörschmann	Heer	Hauptmann	Commander of Panzer-Pionier-Bataillon 13	11 March 1945	—	—
Franz Pöschl	Heer	Hauptmann	Commander of the I./Gebirgsjäger-Regiment 100	23 February 1944	—	—
Michael Pössinger+	Heer	Leutnant of the Reserves	Zugführer (platoon leader) in the 16./Gebirgsjäger-Regiment 98	19 July 1940	Awarded 759th Oak Leaves 28 February 1945	—
Walter Pössl	Heer	Major	Commander of the I./Panzer-Regiment "Großdeutschland"	20 April 1943	—	Black-and-white portrait of a standing man wearing a cap and black military uniform with an Iron Cross displayed at his neck.
Georg Pöthig	Luftwaffe	Oberfeldwebel	Radio operator in the 8./Schlachtgeschwader 2 "Immelmann"	5 September 1944	—	—
Werner Pötschke+	Waffen-SS	SS-Hauptsturmführer	Chief of the 1./SS-Panzer-Regiment 1 "Leibstandarte SS Adolf Hitler"	4 June 1944	Awarded 783rd Oak Leaves 15 March 1945	—
Joachim Pötter	Luftwaffe	Hauptmann	Gruppenkommandeur of the I./Kampfgeschwader 77	16 April 1942	—	—
Eberhard Pohl	Heer	Major	Commander of the I./Infanterie-Regiment 134	17 December 1942	—	—
Franz Pohl	Heer	Unteroffizier	Gun leader in the 14.(Panzerjäger)/Grenadier-Regiment 220 (Note: According to Scherzer as gun leader in the 14./Grenadier-Regiment 220.)	10 September 1944	—	—
Günther Pohl	Heer	Hauptmann (Note: According to Scherzer as Hauptmann of the Reserves.)	Commander of Panzer-Jäger-Abteilung 712	24 February 1945	—	—
Maximilian Ritter von Pohl	Luftwaffe	General der Flieger	Commanding general of the Luftwaffe in Mittelitalien (central Italy) (Note: According to Scherzer as commanding general of the German Luftwaffe in Mittelitalien (central Italy) and commander of the Nahkampf-Korps (close quarters combat corps) of Luftflotte 2.)	15 June 1944	—	—
Wilhelm Pohlmann	Heer	Hauptmann	Leader of a Kampfgruppe in Führer-Begleit-Bataillon	14 March 1943	—	—
[Dr.] Heinrich Pohris (Note: According to Fellgiebel name is Heinrich Pohrig.)	Heer	Leutnant of the Reserves	Zugführer (platoon leader) in the 3./Panzergrenadier-Regiment 12	15 April 1944	—	—
Dr. rer. pol. Fritz Polack	Heer	Oberst	Commander of Artillerie-Regiment 29 (motorized)	27 August 1943	—	—
Harry Polewacz	Waffen-SS	SS-Sturmbannführer	Commander of the III./SS-Panzergrenadier-Regiment "Nordland"	23 December 1942	—	—
Matthias Poll	Heer	Obergefreiter	Company troop leader in the 2./Pionier-Bataillon 186	8 August 1943	—	—
Johann Pollak	Heer	Obergefreiter	Telephone operator in the Stab of I./Grenadier-Regiment 434	4 May 1944*	Killed in action 1 April 1944	—
[Dr.] Othmar Pollmann+	Heer	Major	Commander of the II./Grenadier-Regiment 481	27 August 1943	Awarded 760th Oak Leaves 28 February 1945	—
Otto Pollmann+	Kriegsmarine	Leutnant zur See of the Reserves	Commander of U-Jäger 2210 (22. U-Jagdflottille) (Note: According to Scherzer as commander of U-Jäger 2210.)	19 May 1943	Awarded 461st Oak Leaves 25 April 1944	—
Georg Pollner	Heer	Oberfeldwebel	Zugführer (platoon leader) in the 3./Panzer-Aufklärungs-Abteilung 110	3 November 1944	—	—
Dr. jur. Herbert Pollow	Heer	Oberleutnant of the Reserves	Deputy leader of the II./Infanterie-Regiment 479 (Note: According to Scherzer as leader of the II./Infanterie-Regiment 479.)	1 August 1942	—	—
Heinz Polz	Luftwaffe	Oberwachtmeister	Gun squadron leader in Flak-Sturm-Regiment 241 (motorized)	1 December 1944	—	—
Hellmut Pommer	Heer	Oberleutnant of the Reserves (Note: According to Scherzer as Oberleutnant des Beurlaubtenstandes (of the reserve status))	Chief of the 1./Grenadier-Regiment 179	25 July 1943*	Died of wounds 17 July 1943	—
Gustav Ponath	Heer	Oberstleutnant	Commander of MG-Bataillon 8	13 April 1941	—	—
Hans von Poncet	Heer	Oberst	Commander of Grenadier-Regiment 358	8 August 1944	—	—
Johann Pongratz	Heer	Oberfeldwebel	Zugführer (platoon leader) in the 2./Infanterie-Regiment 74	4 September 1940	—	—
Hermann Poppe	Heer	Oberfeldwebel	Zugführer (platoon leader) in the 13./Grenadier-Regiment 216	23 March 1945	—	—
Hinrich Poppinga	Heer	Oberstleutnant	Commander of Infanterie-Regiment 131	5 February 1942	—	—
Theodor Populo	Heer	Leutnant (Note: According to Scherzer as Leutnant of the Reserves.)	Leader of the 7./Schützen-Regiment 4	27 July 1941	—	—
Rudolf Porath	Kriegsmarine	Leutnant zur See of the Reserves	Commander of Vorpostenboot VP-1806 (18. Vorpostenflottille) (Note: According to Scherzer as commander of Vorpostenboot VP-1806.)	8 October 1941	—	—
Günther Porsch	Luftwaffe	Oberfeldwebel	Pilot and oberserver in the 1.(H)/Aufklärungs-Gruppe 2 (Note: According to Scherzer as pilot and oberserver in the 1./Nahaufklärungsgruppe 2.)	20 July 1944	—	—
Johann Port	Heer	Feldwebel	Zugführer (platoon leader) in the 8.(MG)/Infanterie-Regiment 266 (Note: According to Scherzer as Zugführer (platoon leader) in the 8./Infanterie-Regiment 266.)	25 August 1942	—	—
Josef Portsteffen	Heer	Oberfeldwebel	Shock troops leader in the 1./Pionier-Bataillon 51 (motorized)	21 May 1940	—	—
Joachim Ritter von Poschinger	Heer	Major	Leader of Panzergrenadier-Lehr-Regiment 902	25 January 1945	—	—
Leopold Poschusta	Heer	Unteroffizier	Zugführer (platoon leader) in the 2./Panzer-Füsilier-Regiment "Großdeutschland"	12 November 1943	—	—
Fritz Poske	Kriegsmarine	Korvettenkapitän	Commander of U-504	6 November 1942	—	—
Eduard Post	Heer	Hauptmann of the Reserves	Commander of the III./Grenadier-Regiment 744	28 February 1945	—	—
Martin Post	Heer	Feldwebel	Zugführer (platoon leader) in the 6./Panzergrenadier-Regiment 12	21 September 1944	—	—
Otto Post	Heer	Oberleutnant	Chief of the 1./Divisions-Füsilier-Bataillon 94	29 February 1944	—	—
Georg-Wilhelm Postel+	Heer	Oberst	Commander of Infanterie-Regiment 364	9 August 1942	Awarded 215th Oak Leaves 28 March 1943; 57th Swords 26 March 1944	—
Hermann Potschka	Waffen-SS	SS-Sturmbannführer of the Reserves	Commander of the II./SS-Freiwilligen-Panzer-Artillerie-Regiment 11 "Nordland" (Note: According to Scherzer as commander of the III./SS-Panzer-Artillerie-Regiment 11.)	26 December 1944	—	—
Fritz Prager	Luftwaffe	Hauptmann	Commander of the II./Fallschirmjäger-Regiment 1	24 May 1940	—	—
Otto Prager	Waffen-SS	SS-Sturmbannführer and Major of the Schutzpolizei	Leader of the SS-Polizei-Panzergrenadier-Regiment 7 (Note: According to Scherzer as leader of the SS-Panzergrenadier-Regiment 7.)	9 December 1944	—	—
Heinrich Praßdorf	Kriegsmarine	Obermaschinist	Lead machinist on U-1203	21 April 1945	—	—
Albert Praun	Heer	Generalleutnant	Commander of the 129. Infanterie-Division	27 October 1943	—	—
Johann Prchal	Heer	Unteroffizier	Group leader in the 7./Grenadier-Regiment 448	12 November 1943	—	—
Alexander Preinfalk	Luftwaffe	Unteroffizier	Pilot in the 5./Jagdgeschwader 77	14 October 1942	—	—
Armin Preiss	Heer	Oberleutnant of the Reserves	Chief of the 9./Grenadier-Regiment 520	2 November 1943*	Killed in action 30 September 1943	—
Josef Preiß	Heer	Oberjäger	Group leader in the 15./Jäger-Regiment 227	20 April 1945	—	—
Josef Prentl+	Luftwaffe	Oberleutnant	Chief of the 2./Flak-Regiment 231	21 October 1942	Awarded (851st) Oak Leaves 28 April 1945	—
Heinrich Press	Heer	Hauptmann	Commander of the II./Grenadier-Regiment 105	16 October 1944	—	—
Gustav Preßler+	Luftwaffe	Hauptmann	Gruppenkommandeur of the III./Sturzkampfgeschwader 2 "Immelmann"	4 February 1942	Awarded 188th Oak Leaves 26 January 1943	—
Theodor Preu	Heer	Oberst	Commander of Grenadier-Regiment 21	9 January 1944	—	—
Carl Preuß	Heer	Oberleutnant	Leader of the 6./Grenadier-Regiment 272	14 February 1945	—	—
Ernst Preuß	Heer	Stabsfeldwebel	Aide-de-camp in the III./Grenadier-Regiment 53	17 December 1943	—	—
Georg Preuß	Waffen-SS	SS-Obersturmführer	Leader of the 10.(gepanzert)/SS-Panzergrenadier-Regiment 2 "Leibstandarte SS Adolf Hitler"	5 February 1945	—	—
Wilhelm Preussler	Heer	Oberfeldwebel	Zugführer (platoon leader) in the 12./Grenadier-Regiment 12	9 June 1944*	Killed in action 9 April 1944	—
Otto Priem	Heer	Oberleutnant	Chief of the 10./Grenadier-Regiment 501	16 April 1943	—	—
Günther Prien+	Kriegsmarine	Kapitänleutnant	Commander of U-47	18 October 1939	Awarded 5th Oak Leaves 20 October 1940	A smiling Prien is seen on deck, wearing his navy uniform.
Peter Prien? (Note: Peter Prien was nominated twice for the Knight's Cross of the Iron Cross. The first nomination was made for actions before end of March 1945, while a second nomination was submitted on 9 May 1945, presumably for a different deed. A contemporary file card for the first nomination still exists, which was created by the Heerespersonalamt (HPA—Army Staff Office) for a nomination received on 28 March 1945. This nomination did not prevail. A Heerespersonalamt-Verleihungsvorschlag (HPA-VV—Army Staff Office Nomination Recommendation) was not created. He was also not listed in the book "Verliehene Ritterkreuze" (Awarded Knight Crosses) for his first nomination. The first nomination was either left unfinished by the end of the war, or it was rejected. An argument supporting the rejection thesis is the fact that the nomination paperwork completed by Prien's unit is no longer available. On the other hand, there is no rejection number or note on the file card. The second nomination, presumably a teleprinter message, is also no longer available. Again no HPA-VV was created nor a file card. Major Joachim Domaschk noted this nomination in the first section of the book "Verliehene Ritterkreuze" with an entry Nr. 5101. This number was assigned twice, the second section of this book starts with Nr. 5100. Why Domaschk listed him there cannot be determined anymore. This entry states that the nomination by Prien's unit was received by the HPA on 9 May 1945 and was forwarded (Scherzer assumes to General Ernst Maisel) and awarded the very same day. The presentation was unlawfully made, first because it is dated after 8 May 1945, secondly because neither General Maisel nor Major Domaschk had been authorized to do so. Prien was a member of the Association of Knight's Cross Recipients (AKCR).)	Heer	Oberleutnant of the Reserves	Leader of the Stabskompanie in the 2. Panzer-Division	9 May 1945	—	—
Helmuth Prieß	Heer	Generalleutnant	Commander of the 121. Infanterie-Division	7 March 1944	—	
Hermann Prieß+	Waffen-SS	SS-Oberführer	Commander of Artillerie-Regiment of the SS-Panzergrenadier-Division "Totenkopf" (Note: According to Scherzer as commander of SS-Artillerie-Regiment "Totenkopf".)	28 April 1943	Awarded 297th Oak Leaves 9 September 1943; 65th Swords 24 April 1944	Black-and-white portrait of a man wearing a military uniform with an Iron Cross displayed at his neck.
Günter Prill	Heer	Oberleutnant	Chief of the 3./Grenadier-Regiment 51 (motorized)	18 January 1944	—	—
Josef Priller+	Luftwaffe	Oberleutnant	Staffelkapitän of the 6./Jagdgeschwader 51	19 October 1940	Awarded 28th Oak Leaves 20 July 1941; 73rd Swords 2 July 1944	—
Hugo Primozic+	Heer	Wachtmeister	Zugführer (platoon leader) in the 2./Sturmgeschütz-Abteilung 667	19 September 1942	Awarded 185th Oak Leaves 25 January 1943	—
Josef Prinner	Heer	Generalleutnant	Höherer Artilleriekommandeur 311	11 January 1945	—	—
Karl-Heinz Prinz	Waffen-SS	SS-Sturmbannführer	Commander of the II./SS-Panzer-Regiment 12 "Hitlerjugend" (Note: According to Scherzer as commander of the II./SS-Panzer-Regiment 12.)	11 July 1944	—	—
Kurt Prinz	Heer	Oberleutnant	Leader of the I./Grenadier-Regiment 164	14 April 1945	—	—
Bernhard von Prittwitz und Gaffron	Heer	Oberstleutnant	Leader of Grenadier-Regiment 586	24 June 1944*	Killed in action 25 April 1944	—
Klaus Pritzel	Luftwaffe	Hauptmann	Staffelkapitän of the 2.(F)/Aufklärungs-Gruppe des Oberkommando der Luftwaffe (Note: According to Scherzer as Staffelkapitän of the Aufklärungsstaffel 2.(F)/Oberkommando der Luftwaffe.)	15 October 1942	—	—
Heinz Probst	Luftwaffe	Unteroffizier	Zugführer (platoon leader) in Fallschirm-Panzergrenadier-Regiment 1 "Hermann Göring" (Note: According to Scherzer as Zugführer (platoon leader) in 1./Fallschirm-Panzergrenadier-Regiment 1 "Hermann Göring".)	26 March 1945	—	—
Theodor Probst (Note: According to Scherzer and the Deutsche Dienststelle (WASt) his name is Theodor Prost who received the Knight's Cross of the Iron Cross as Zugführer (platoon leader) in the 12./Grenadier-Regiment 519.)	Heer	Oberfeldwebel	Zugführer (platoon leader) in the 12.(MG)/Grenadier-Regiment 519	20 April 1943	—	—
Ernst Prochaska	Heer	Leutnant of the Reserves	Leader of the 8./Lehr-Regiment z.b.V. 800 "Brandenburg"	16 September 1942*	Killed in action 9 August 1942	—
Alois Prochazka	Heer	Leutnant	Leader of the 10./Infanterie-Regiment 38	24 June 1940	—	—
Robert Freiherr von Prochazka	Heer	Hauptmann	Department leader in Werfer-Regiment 55 (Note: According to Scherzer as commander of the III./Werfer-Regiment 55.)	19 December 1943	—	—
Georg Proehl	Heer	Rittmeister	Chief of the 2./Jäger-Regiment 39 (L)	9 December 1944	—	—
Günther Pröhl	Heer	Hauptmann of the Reserves	Leader of Panzer-Jäger-Abteilung 290	10 January 1942	—	—
Karl Pröll+	Heer	Hauptmann	Commander of the II./Panzergrenadier-Regiment 63	30 January 1943	Awarded 715th Oak Leaves 25 January 1945	—
Erwin Prössl	Luftwaffe	Leutnant	Pilot in the 4.(H)/Aufklärungs-Gruppe 31 (Note: According to Scherzer as pilot in the Nahaufklärungsstaffel 4.(H)/31.)	29 February 1944	—	—
Bodo Proetzel	Luftwaffe	Oberleutnant	Observer in the 2.(F)/Aufklärungs-Gruppe 11 (Note: According to Scherzer as observer in the Aufklärungsstaffel 2.(F)/11.)	4 August 1944	—	—
Herbert Proll	Heer	Hauptmann	Commander of the I./Grenadier-Regiment 106	9 June 1944	—	—
Ludwig Promesberger	Heer	Obergefreiter	Machine gunner in the 8./Panzergrenadier-Regiment 103	14 May 1944	—	—
Hans Prominski	Luftwaffe	Oberleutnant (Note: According to Scherzer as Leutnant and observer in the Aufklärungsstaffel 2.(F)/22.)	Observer in the 2.(F)/Aufklärungs-Gruppe 22	8 August 1944	—	—
Friedrich-Wilhelm Proske	Heer	Oberleutnant	Chief of the 1.(Radfahr)/Infanterie-Regiment 84 (Note: According to Scherzer as chief of the 1./Infanterie-Regiment 84.)	12 April 1942	—	—
Emil Pross	Heer	Hauptmann	Leader of the II./Grenadier-Regiment 62	30 September 1944	—	—
Sergey Protopopoff	Waffen-SS	SS-Sturmbannführer	Group commander of the 33.SS Charlemagne division (Note: According to Scherzer as group commander of the 33.SS Charlemagne division)	27 April 1945	—	—
Walter Prüger	Luftwaffe	Oberleutnant	Staffelführer of the 2./Küstenfliegergruppe 606	5 January 1943*	Killed in action 6 July 1942	—
Karl Prümm	Heer	Oberleutnant (Note: According to Scherzer as Oberleutnant of the Reserves.)	Chief of the 7./Grenadier-Regiment 105	21 May 1943	—	—
Walter Prüß+	Heer	Leutnant	Leader of the 6./Grenadier-Regiment 76 (motorized)	10 September 1944	Awarded 796th Oak Leaves 23 March 1945	—
Willi Pruß	Heer	Oberst	Commander of Grenadier-Regiment 670	5 February 1945	—	—
Felix Przedwojewski	Waffen-SS	SS-Unterscharführer	Gun leader in the 2./SS-Sturmgeschütz-Abteilung 3 "Totenkopf" (Note: According to Scherzer as gun leader in the 2./SS-Sturmgeschütz-Abteilung 3.)	16 December 1943	—	—
Kurt Przyklenk	Heer	Oberfeldwebel	Reconnaissance troop leader in the 1./Panzer-Aufklärungs-Abteilung 40	1 August 1941	—	—
Rudolf Puchinger	Luftwaffe	Oberleutnant	Staffelkapitän of the 8./Kampfgeschwader 6	24 January 1943	—	—
Carl Püchler	Heer	Oberst	Commander of Infanterie-Regiment 228	20 December 1941	—	—
Theodor Pültz	Heer	Leutnant of the Reserves	Zugführer (platoon leader) in the 5./Panzer-Aufklärungs-Abteilung 9	10 August 1943	—	—
Dr. Martin Püschel	Heer	Major	Commander of the II./Schützen-Regiment 33	8 August 1941	—	—
Heinrich Püttcher	Heer	Leutnant of the Reserves	Company leader in Panzer-Pionier-Bataillon 86	14 April 1945	—	—
Günther Pulst	Kriegsmarine	Oberleutnant zur See	Commander of U-978	21 December 1944	—	—
Paul Punkt	Heer	Oberleutnant (Note: According to Scherzer as Oberleutnant of the Reserves.)	Chief of the 3./Heeres-Pionier-Bataillon 753	11 March 1945	—	—
Nikolaus Purklis (Note: According to Scherzer name is spelled Nikolaus Purlis.)	Heer	Unteroffizier	Group leader in the 6./Grenadier-Regiment 430	28 October 1944	—	—
Emil Pusch! (Note: Walther-Peer Fellgiebel lists Emil Pusch as a recipient of the Knight's Cross of the Iron Cross on 9 November 1944 as Oberfeldwebel and pilot in Nachtjagdgeschwader 2. He is delisted again by Fellgiebel in the year 2000 without stating a reason.)	Luftwaffe	Oberfeldwebel	Pilot in Nachtjagdgeschwader 2	9 November 1944	—	—
Herbert Puschmann	Luftwaffe	Hauptmann	Staffelkapitän of the 6./Jagdgeschwader 51 "Mölders"	5 April 1944*	Killed in action 3 February 1944	—
Dietrich Puttfarken	Luftwaffe	Oberleutnant	Pilot in the 1./Kampfgeschwader 51	7 October 1942	—	—
Helmut Putz	Luftwaffe	Oberleutnant	Pilot in the II./Kampfgeschwader 27 "Boelcke"	19 September 1942	—	—
Erich Putzka	Luftwaffe	Hauptmann	Staffelkapitän of the 3.(F)/Aufklärungs-Gruppe 121 (Note: According to Scherzer as Staffelkapitän of the Aufklärungsstaffel 3.(F)/121.)	9 December 1942	—	—
