= Emil Friedrich von Boetticher =

German politician (1836–1907)

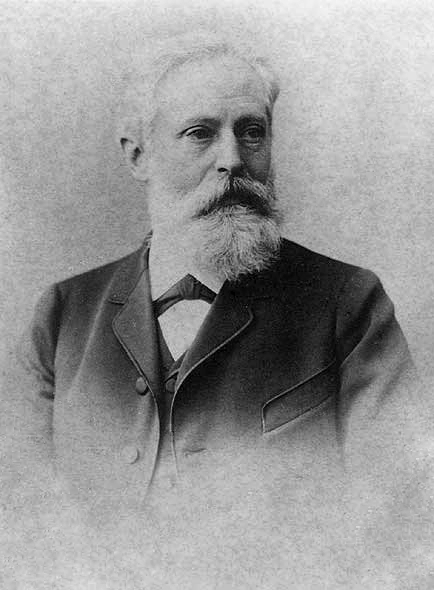
- Born: 1 October 1836; Riga
- Died: 9 March 1907 (aged 70); Riga
- Occupation: politician

Emil Friedrich von Boetticher (1836–1907) was a politician, burgomaster of Riga and its representative on the Livonian state council.

Boetticher was born 1 October 1836 at Riga, the youngest son to the Riga merchant and landowner Carl von Boetticher (1782–1859) and Emilie Wippert (1794–1855). He was the younger brother of the art historian Friedrich von Boetticher.

He attended the private school of Pastor Albanus in Dünamünde and Engelhardtshof, in Livonia, from 1847 to 1853, after which he transferred to Hollandersche Privatlehranstalt, the school founded by Albert Woldemar Hollander, in Birkenruh near Wenden for his 'Abitur' (examinations taken in the final year of secondary school), which he passed a year later. From 1855 to 1858 he studied law in Dorpat, followed with study at Heidelberg and Berlin from 1859 to 1860, and study trips to France, Italy and Switzerland.

After returning to Riga Boetticher became a trainee ('auskulant') at the city council in 1861, and became a council clerk in 1864. From 1865 he was a criminal court assessor (magistrates' assistant). In 1868 he became a city councillor, and served as churchwarden ('Kirchenvögte') to several churches in Riga. This was followed in 1870 by his appointment as President of Section II of the ecclesiastical Bailiwick Court, and in 1872, as its Chief Bailiff ('Obervogt'). From 1870, as a delegate advocate (syndic), he advised the city on legal matters. In addition he was, in 1871, the ecclesiastical inspector for St John's Church.

After the introduction in Riga of the 1878 Russian City Code (Russischen Städteordnung), he was elected city councillor, and in 1881 became burgomaster (bürgermeister); his responsibilities included presiding over orphanage, and gas and waterworks administration, and later overseeing the supply of clean drinking water. In 1882 he became administration president of The Cathedral Church of Saint Mary and, from 1883, became president of the cemetery commission and administrator of the city library. From 1885 to 1906 extensive renovation work was carried out on Riga Cathedral and its cloisters under his leadership. Following the annulment of Riga council's constitution in 1889, Boetticher became the department head of the Municipal Goods Administration, and in 1894 became the city and district's chief administrator. In 1895 he became the chairman of the local committee of the Archaeological Congress. and in 1899, the city's state representative and deputy to the Livonian Diet (state assembly). In 1906 he took over the chairmanship of the newly founded von Boetticher family association (Geschlechtsverbandes der Familien von Boetticher).

Boetticher married twice, firstly in 1864 to Christine (Christel) Hollander (1841–1871), daughter to Albert Woldemar Hollander; the marriage produced three children. After the early death of Christine, he married her younger sister Johanna (1844–1917) in 1874. He died in Riga on 9 March 1907, and is interred in the family grave at Riga Cathedral Cemetery.

The cathedral administration honoured Emil von Boetticher by erecting a memorial plaque, placed on the right altar wall of Riga Cathedral, commemorating his services to the restoration of the church building.

== Publications ==
- Berkholz, A von; Blumenbach, A; Boetticher, Emil von; Der Stadt Riga Verwaltung und Haushalt in den Jahren 1878–1900, N. Carlberg (ed.), Riga, Müllersche Buchdruckerei, 1901.
- "Der Ratsherr Heinrich Carl Johann von Boetticher und seine Familie" in Nachrichten über die Familie von Boetticher, Kurländische Linie II, E. M. Monse, Bautzen, 1892.
- Nachrichten über die Familie von Boetticher, Kurländische Linie 11, Poppdruck, Langenhagen 1995, p. 83.
- Boetticher Emil Friedrich, Baltic Biographical Dictionary, 2012, p. 87
