= Friedrich Heinrich von Boetticher =

German art historian (1826–1902)

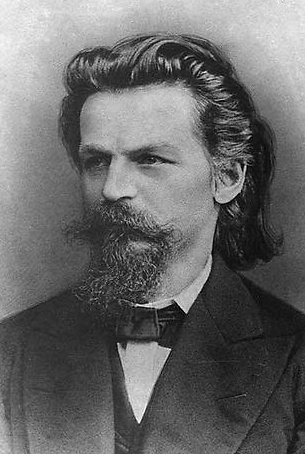
- Friedrich Heinrich von Boetticher
- Born: 23 June 1826; Riga
- Died: 12 February 1902 (aged 75); Dresden
- Occupation: Art historian

Friedrich Heinrich von Boetticher (1826–1902) was a German publisher, bookseller, scholar, and art historian.

Boetticher was born 23 June 1826 in Riga, the tenth of 17 children of the merchant and landowner Carl von Boetticher (1782–1859) and Emilie Wippert (1794–1855).

After attending grammar school in Riga, he studied philology and later law from 1846 to 1849 in Dorpat. Following this, he trained as a farmer at the private Brösa Institute near Bautzen, run by his future brother-in-law, the agronomist Ernst Theodor Stöckhardt, and where he married the pastor's daughter Eugenie Mitschke (1825–1858) in 1850. In the same year he acquired a manor at the Großdubrau municipality village of Zschillichau, which he farmed until 1853, after which he sold it and worked as his father's manager in Riga. He left Riga in 1854 and moved to Saxony, where he acquired a publishing bookshop in Dresden, to which an art shop was later attached. In 1859 he became a Saxon citizen and, after the early death of his first wife, married Alexandra von Friede (1822–1908), daughter of Major General Carl Johann von Friede.

Boetticher was brother to the mayor of Riga, Emil von Boetticher (1836–1907), and father to the physician and genealogist Walter von Boetticher (1853–1945). Through his eldest daughter Maria (born 1851) he was father-in-law to Karl Pabst (1835–1910), the mayor of Weimar, and through his daughter Eugenie (born 1858), father-in-law to the composer Franz Curti (1854–1898). Boetticher died on 12 February 1902 in Dresden and was buried at the Alter Annenfriedhof (Old Annen Cemetery).

After years of art-historical study, he published Malerwerke des neunzehnten Jahrhunderts, Beitrag zur Kunstgeschichte (Nineteenth-Century Paintings, Contribution to the History of Art) in two volumes between 1891 and 1901, which includes 50,000 paintings by German painters and painters active in Germany. This comprehensive publication is used as a standard reference for art auction houses.

== Publications ==
- Malerwerke des neunzehnten Jahrhunderts, Beitrag zur Kunstgeschichte (Nineteenth-Century Paintings, Contribution to the History of Art), Volume 1; Volume 2, Dresden 1891–1898. ISBN 0666812446
- Zur Erinnerung an Friedrich von Boetticher (In Memory of Friedrich von Boetticher), poems edited by Alexandra von Boetticher, Dresden, February 1902
- Weihnachtsgrüße von Friedrich von Boetticher (Christmas Greetings from Friedrich von Boetticher), poems edited by Alexandra von Boetticher, Dresden, December 1902
