= Karl Pabst =

German politician

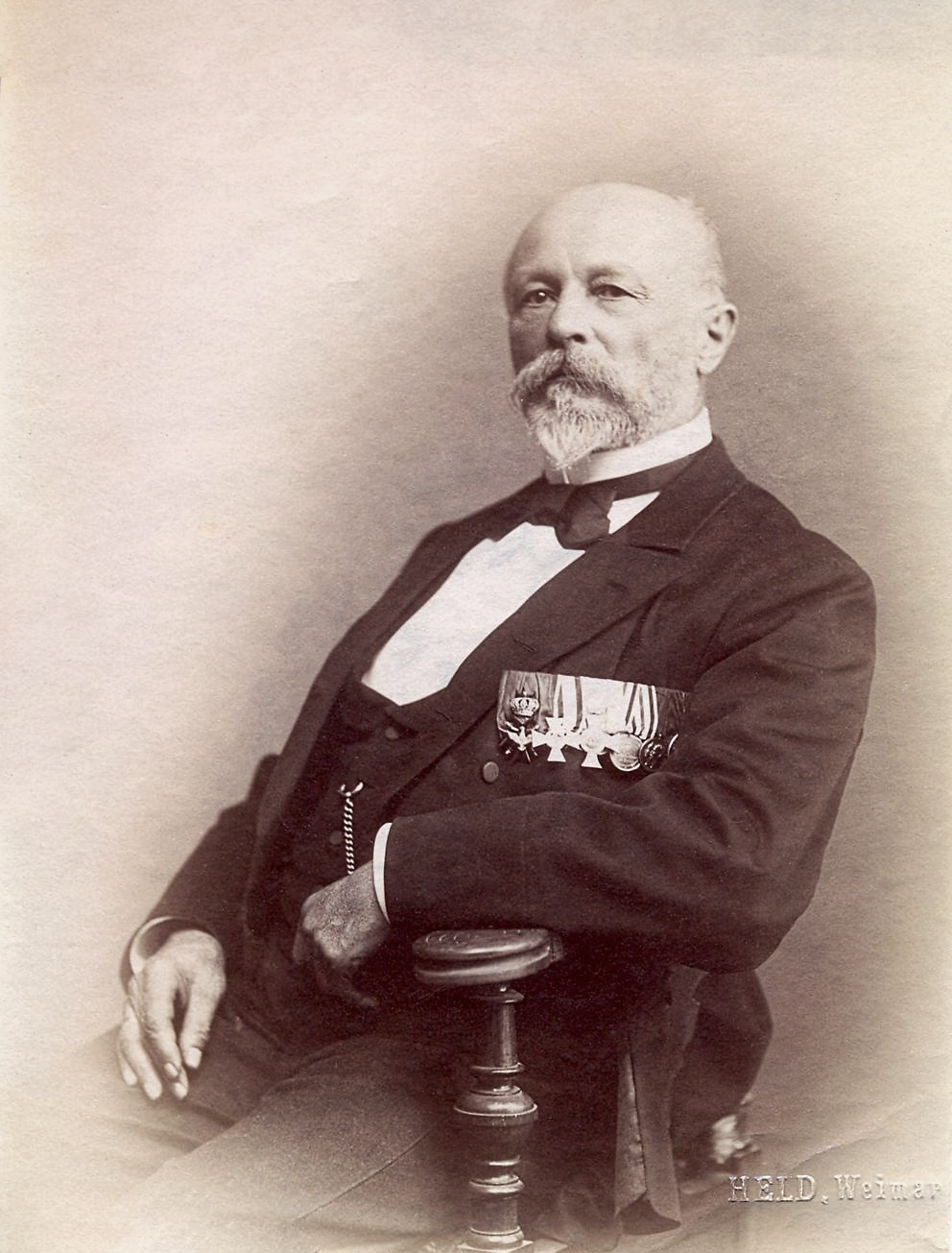
- Born: 23 July 1835; Weimar
- Died: 21 December 1910 (aged 75); Weimar
- Occupation: civic politician

Karl Pabst (1835–1910) was a German municipal politician and Lord Mayor of the city of Weimar.

Pabst was born 23 July 1835 in Weimar. In 1853, during his studies, he became a member of the 'Burschenschaft Teutonia Jena' (Fraternity Teutonia Jena).

Together with Louis Döllstädt, Pabst was the leading man in Weimar's municipal administration from the founding of the German Empire in 1871 until his death. Pabst joined the administration of Weimar in 1871, was elected to the municipal council in February 1873, and became its chairman and Burgomaster (mayor) in January 1876. In 1888 he became Oberbürgermeister (Lord Mayor) and was confirmed in this office for life in 1899. From 1897 he was also chairman of the 'Thuringian Association of Towns'. His tenure as mayor lasted from 1875 to 1910.

Pabst was instrumental in Weimar achieving a regional pioneering role in the fields of environment and health. "Pabst, who for several years was vice-chairman of the International Association against the Pollution of Rivers, Soil and Air, was particularly receptive to questions of urban hygiene, especially in the field of drainage and waste disposal". He was responsible for the establishment of schools and health centres. During his term of office, streets were paved, and a collection centre for refuse established. The city received electric light, a tram system, improved water supply, a sewerage system completed by 1910, and a canal network in the 1880s. This modernisation was an important prerequisite for Weimar as a growing tourist town to accommodate an increasing number of visitors.

On 5 June 1899, an appeal was circulated by the newly founded 'Committee for the Erection of a Bismarck Tower of Honour', headed by Pabst, which asked for financial support for its planned construction. Pabst was an honorary member of various associations, including the 'Gesellschaft für Naturwissenschaft, Völker- und Altertumskunde' (Society for Natural Science, Ethnology, and Antiquity) from 1904.

In 1875, he married Maria (née von Boetticher), 16 years his junior and daughter to the art historian Friedrich von Boetticher, thus becoming brother-in-law to the physician and genealogist Walter von Boetticher. Pabst died 21 December 1910 at Weimar. Part of Pabst's estate has been held in Weimar City Archives since 2008.

Pabststraße in Weimar is named after Pabst.

== Publications ==
- Dvorak, Helge; Biographisches Lexikon der Deutschen Burschenschaft (Biographical Dictionary of German Fraternity), Christian Hünemörder (ed.), Volume I: Politiker, Teilband 4: M–Q. Universitätsverlag Winter (Winter University Press) 2000, pp. 266–267. ISBN 3-8253-1118-X
- Pabst, Karl, in Weimar. Lexikon zur Stadtgeschichte, Gitta Günther, Wolfram Huschke, Walter Steiner (editors), Böhlau, Weimar 1993, p. 341. ISBN 3-7400-0807-5
- "Technischer Modernisierer einer Fremdenstadt" in Rathauskurier. Amtsblatt der Stadt Weimar ("Technical Moderniser of a Tourist City" in City Hall Courier – the official gazette of the city of Weimer), Issue 23, 18 December 2010, p. 5182 (German). Retrieved 15 January 2021
