= 8th Jäger Division =

8th Infantry Division 8th Light Infantry Division 8th Jäger Division
- German: 8. Infanterie-Division; 8. Leichte Division; 8. Jäger-Division
- Unit insignia
- Active: October 1934–May 1945
- Country: Nazi Germany
- Branch: German Army
- Type: Light infantry
- Size: Division
- Garrison/HQ: Oppeln
- Nickname: Schlesische Division
- Engagements: World War II

Commanders
- Notable commanders: Rudolf Koch-Erpach

The German 8th Infantry Division (8. Infanterie-Division) was formed in Oppeln on 1 October 1934 under the cover name Artillerieführer III which was used until 15 October 1935. It was mobilized in August 1939 and took part in the Invasion of Poland, the Battle of France and Operation Barbarossa, the invasion of the Soviet Union. On 1 December 1941, it was reorganized and redesignated 8th Light Infantry Division. It was again redesignated on 30 June 1942 as the 8th Jäger Division. It surrendered to the Red Army in Moravia in May 1945.

== Background ==
The main purpose of the German Jäger Divisions was to fight in adverse terrain where smaller, coordinated units were more facilely combat capable than the brute force offered by the standard infantry divisions. The Jäger divisions were more heavily equipped than mountain divisions, but not as well armed as a larger infantry division. In the early stages of the war, they were the interface divisions fighting in rough terrain and foothills as well as urban areas, between the mountains and the plains. The Jägers (means hunters in German) relied on a high degree of training, and slightly superior communications, as well as their not inconsiderable artillery support. In the middle stages of the war, as the standard infantry divisions were downsized, the Jäger structure of divisions with two infantry regiments, became the standard table of organization.

In 1943, Adolf Hitler declared that all infantry divisions were now Grenadier Divisions except for his elite Jäger and Mountain Jaeger divisions.

== Area of operations ==
- Poland (September 1939 – May 1940)
- France (May 1940 – June 1941)
- Eastern front (June 1941 – December 1941)

As 8th Light Infantry Division

- France (December 1941 – March 1942)
- Eastern front, northern sector (March 1942 – June 1942)

As 8th Jäger Division

- Eastern front, northern sector (June 1942 – March 1944)
- Eastern front, southern sector (March 1944 – May 1945)

== Commanders ==
- General der Kavallerie Rudolf Koch-Erpach (15 October 1935 – 25 October 1940)
- General der Infanterie Gustav Höhne (25 October 1940 – 23 July 1942)
- General der Panzertruppe Gerhard Graf von Schwerin (23 July 1942 – 13 November 1942)
- General der Gebirgstruppe Friedrich-Jobst Volckamer von Kirchensittenbach (13 November 1942 – 1 September 1944)
- Generalleutnant Christian Philipp (1 September 1944 – April 1945)

== Order of battle ==
- Jäger Regiment 28
- Jäger Regiment 38
- Radfahr Battalion 8
- Artillery Regiment 8
- Pionier Battalion 8
- Panzerjäger Battalion 8
- Signals Battalion 8
- Feldersatz Battalion 8
- Versorgungseinheiten 8
