= Friedrich Pein =

Austrian Sniper

- Born: 20 October 1915; Spitz, Radkersburg District, Austria
- Died: 14 February 1975 (aged 59); Mureck, Austria
- Military career
- Allegiance: Nazi Germany
- Rank: Oberjäger
- Unit: 100th Jäger Division
- Conflicts: World War II
- Awards: Knight's Cross of the Iron Cross

Friedrich Pein (20 October 1915 – 14 February 1975) was an Austrian sniper in the Wehrmacht of Nazi Germany during World War II, and one of two to have been awarded the Knight's Cross of the Iron Cross, the other being Matthäus Hetzenauer.

Pein enlisted in the Wehrmacht in October 1938. His served as a sniper in the 143d Gebirgsjäger Regiment of the 6th Mountain Division on the Eastern Front. In early 1944, he was transferred to the 100th Jäger Division. On 28 February 1945 he was awarded the Knight's Cross of the Iron Cross marking his 200th kill as a sniper.

== Awards ==
- Knight's Cross of the Iron Cross on 28 February 1945 as Oberjäger and sniper in the 2./Jäger-Regiment 227
