= Friedrich-Jobst Volckamer von Kirchensittenbach =

German general (1894–1989)

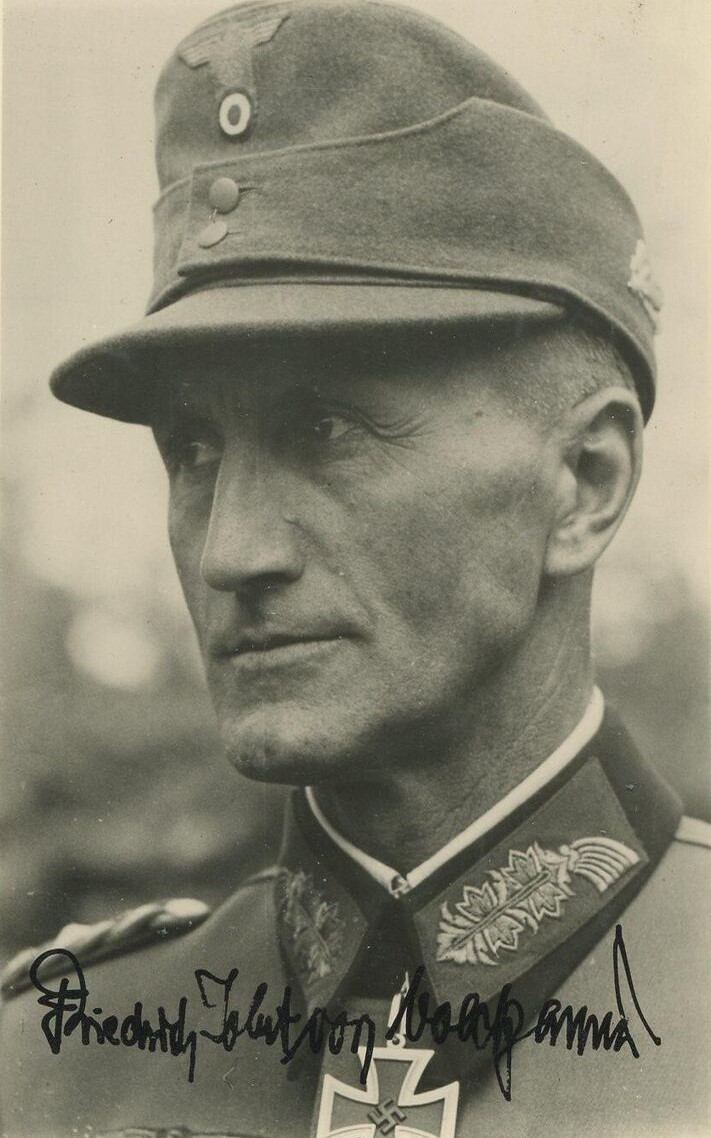
- Kirchensittenbach in 1944
- Born: 16 April 1894; Oberstdorf, German Empire
- Died: 3 April 1989 (aged 94); Munich, West Germany
- Military career
- Allegiance: German Empire; Weimar Republic; Nazi Germany
- Branch: Imperial German Army; Reichswehr; German Army
- Service years: 1913–1945
- Rank: General der Gebirgstruppe
- Commands: 8th Jäger Division; L Army Corps; 16th Army
- Conflicts: World War I; World War II; Polish Campaign; French Campaign; Operation Marita; Siege of Leningrad; Battle of Debrecen; Courland Pocket
- Awards: Knight's Cross of the Iron Cross

Friedrich-Jobst Volckamer von Kirchensittenbach (16 April 1894 – 3 April 1989) was a German General der Gebirgstruppe in the German Army during World War II. He commanded the 8th Jäger Division, 16th Army, and L Army Corps. He was a recipient of the Knight's Cross of the Iron Cross.

He served in the Germany Army during the First World War on the Western Front. He received both classes of the Iron Cross for his achievements and was promoted to first lieutenant on 6 April 1918. In 1919, he was briefly a member of the Epp Freikorps before joining the regular Reichswehr.

In the Second World War, Kirchensittenbach served in the Balkans and Eastern Front, promoted to Major General in December 1942. He surrendered to the Red Army in 1945 in the Courland Pocket. Convicted as a war criminal in the Soviet Union, he was held until 1955.

== Awards and decorations ==
- Iron Cross (1914)
  - 2nd Class
  - 1st Class
- 4th Class with Swords and Crown of the Military Merit Order (Bavaria)
- Honour Cross of the World War 1914/1918
- Iron Cross (1939)
  - 2nd Class
  - 1st Class
- Infantry Assault Badge
- Commander's Cross Order of Saint Alexander (1941)
- Commander's Cross of the Order of the Star of Romania with Swords (1941)
- Order of Military Merit (Bulgaria) (1941/42)
  - 2nd Class
  - 1st Class
- German Cross in Gold (3 November 1943)
- Knight's Cross of the Iron Cross on 26 March 1944 as Generalleutnant and commander of 8. Jäger Division
- Courland Cuff Title (1945)

Military offices
Preceded by General der Panzertruppe Gerhard Graf von Schwerin	Commander of 8. Jäger-Division; 13 November 1942 – 1 September 1944	Succeeded by Generalleutnant Christian Philipp
Preceded by Generalleutnant Hans Boeckh-Behrens	Commander of L. Armeekorps; 25 October 1944 - 11 April 1945	Succeeded by Generalleutnant Erpo Freiherr von Bodenhausen
Preceded by General der Infanterie Ernst-Anton von Krosigk	Commander of 16. Armee; 17 March 1945 - 10 May 1945	Succeeded by None
