= Franz Curti =

Swiss-German composer

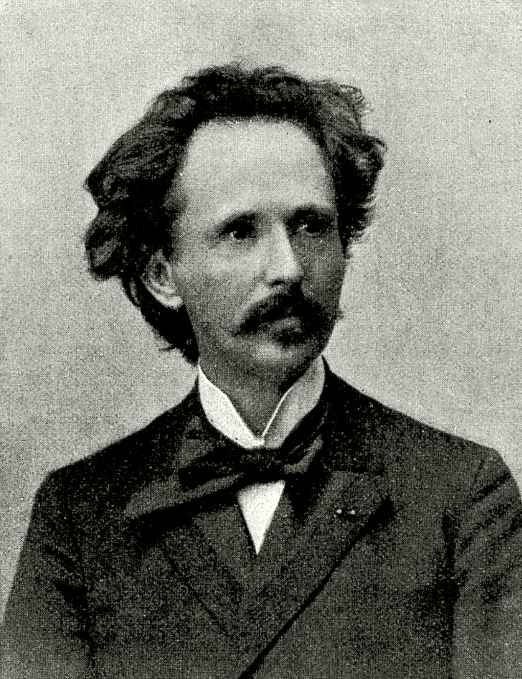
- Born: 16 November 1854; Kassel
- Died: 6 February 1898 (aged 43); Dresden
- Occupation: composer

Jean Baptist Joseph Franz Henry Curti (1854–1898) was a Swiss-German opera composer.

Curti was born 16 November 1854 at Kassel, son to the lawyer and court opera singer Anton Curti (1820–1887), and his wife Marie Clementine, née Gräbner (1827–1898). From 1864, while his father took up engagements in Europe's opera houses, Curti grew up with his uncle in Rapperswil, Switzerland, on the shores of Lake Zurich. In addition to school lessons, he learned to play the piano, organ and violin. After graduating from high school in 1871 he travelled to Italy to recover from lung disease; while there he was impressed by the country's opera.

In 1880 he completed medical studies and the state examination at Berlin, subsequently opening a dental practice in Dresden. In addition to his medical practice he took composition lessons with Edmund Kretschmer (1830–1908) and Heinrich Schulz-Beuthen (1838–1915). Curti published his first work Die Gletscherjungfrau in 1882, and his first opera, Hertha, was awarded the Gold Medal for Art and Science by Ernst II, Duke of Saxe-Altenburg in 1887. His international breakthrough came in 1896, two years before his death, with the opera Lili-Tsee, which was given 30 performances at the Metropolitan Opera in New York. Curti began his last opera, Dasösli vom Säntis in 1880, but did not live to see its 1898 premiere as he died in the same year at the age of 44.

In 1880 Curti married Eugenie von Boetticher (born 1858), daughter to the Dresden art historian Friedrich von Boetticher. The couple had four children: Johanna Eugenie (1881–1957), Friedrich Albert (1883–1949), Hertha (1887–1978) and Reinhard Johannes (1890–1972). Curti died 6 February 1898 and was interred in the Johannis cemetery at Tolkewitz in Dresden.

In 1901 Franz-Curti-Straße, a street in the Dresden district of Loschwitz was named after Curti, as was in 2000 the Curti-Platz, a square at the harbour in Rapperswil. He left behind songs and choral works which were influenced by German Romanticism, but also by Switzerland which was perceived as his homeland, and where his work was widely performed. Wagner was a significant influence, particularly shown in his 1889 romantic opera in four acts, Reinhard von Ufenau.

== Selected works ==
Choral:

- Wenn ich wär der Mondenschein (If I were the moonlight), in Six Vocal Quartets, op. 2
- Zwiefacher Frühling (Twice the Springtime), op. 8
- Vier Männerquartette (Four Male Quartets), op. 12
- Frieden der Nacht (Peace of the Night), op. 17
- Die Schlacht (The Battle), op. 45

Solo:

- Am See (By the lake), op. 6
- Ave Maria, op. 7
- Seligkeit (Bliss), op. 11
- Der Maria Wiegenlied (The Maria Lullaby), op. 16

Stage and opera:

- Die Gletscherjungfrau (The Glacier Maiden), M. Vollhardt-Wittich, cantata, later reworked into an opera, 1882
- Hertha, M. Vollhardt-Wittich, romantic opera, 1887
- Reinhard von Ufenau, 1889
- Erlöst (Redeemed), one act music drama, 1893
- Lili-Tsee, 1896
- Das Rösli vom Säntis (The Rösli from the Säntis), 1898

Instrumental:

- Symphony in B flat major, op. 14
- Semele (F. v. Schiller), 1887
- Die Schweiz (Switzerland), orchestral suite, 1892
- Schneefried, 1895
