= Christian Philipp =

German general during World War II

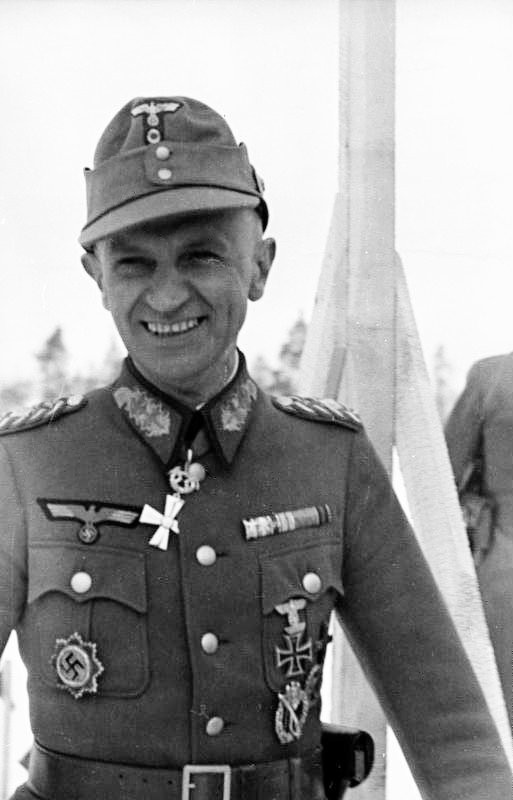
- Philipp in 1942, Finland
- Born: 3 September 1893
- Died: 16 October 1963 (aged 70)
- Military career
- Allegiance: Nazi Germany
- Branch: Army (Wehrmacht)
- Rank: Generalleutnant
- Commands: 6th Mountain Division; 8th Jäger Division
- Conflicts: World War II
- Awards: Knight's Cross of the Iron Cross

Christian Philipp (3 September 1893 – 16 October 1963) was a German general during World War II who commanded several divisions. He was a recipient of the Knight's Cross of the Iron Cross of Nazi Germany.

== Awards and decorations ==
- Knight's Cross of the Iron Cross on 11 March 1945 as Generalleutnant and commander of 8. Jäger-Division

Military offices
Preceded by Generalmajor Ferdinand Schörner	Commander of 6. Gebirgs-Division; 1 February 1942 - 20 August 1944	Succeeded by Generalmajor Max-Josef Pemsel
Preceded by General der Gebirgstruppen Friedrich-Jobst Volckamer von Kirchensittenbach	Commander of 8th Jäger Division; 1 September 1944 - April 1945	Succeeded by none
