= Albert Woldemar Hollander =

German educationist (1796–1868)

- Born: 22 September 1796; Riga
- Died: 6 March 1868 (aged 71); Birkenruh, Riga
- Occupations: educator and pedagog

Albert Woldemar Hollander (1796–1868), was an educator and pedagog from the Russian Empire.

Hollander was born 22 September 1796 in Riga, Livonia to Johann Heinrich Hollander and Karoline Amalie Marg. (Stumpf), from a well-to-do and influential family in Riga.

He attended first the Evangelical Grammar School to the Grey Monastery in Berlin, and then the Riga Gymnasium. From 1815 to 1819 he studied theology and philology at Dorpat, Jena and Berlin, and became a theological follower of Friedrich Schleiermacher. He became a member of the Urburschenschaft in 1816, and the Alte Berliner Burschenschaft in 1818; as a member of the Burschenschaft he took part in the 1817 Wartburg Festival.

Hollander co-founded, with Leopold von Holst, a private educational institution in Fellin in 1820. He visited Johann Heinrich Pestalozzi's institute in Yverdon, Switzerland. Impressed by him, in 1825 he founded a large school and educational institution at Birkenruh (Bērzaine) in Cēsis, Livonia, which later became the Landesgymnasium Birkenruh (Birkenruh State Grammar School), which he ran until 1861. The University of Jena awarded him an honorary doctorate in 1850.

Hollander married Charlotte Dorothea Rathlef, daughter to Georg Ludwig Rathlef; the marriage produced 14 children. He died 6 March 1868 in Birkenruh as a result of a cold contracted while rescuing a farmer's wife who had been found frozen to death.

== Publications ==
- Eckardt, Julius von; "Hollander, Albert Woldemar" in Allgemeine Deutsche Biographie (Universal German Biography) (ADB), Volume 12, Duncker & Humblot, Leipzig 1880, p. 749
- Dvorak, Helge; Biographisches Lexikon der Deutschen Burschenschaft (Biographical Dictionary of German Fraternity), Christian Hünemörder (ed.) Volume 1 – Politicians, Volume 2 – F-H, Universitätsverlag Winter (Winter University Press) 1999, p. 385. ISBN 3-8253-0809-X
- "Die Mitglieder der Urburschenschaft 1815–1819" in Stamm-Buch der Jenaischen Burschenschaft ("The members of the original fraternity 1815–1819" in Stud book of the Jena fraternity), Peter Kaupp (ed.), Volume 14. SH-Verlag, Cologne 2005, pp. 75–76. ISBN 3894981563
- Die Feier des 25-jährigen Bestens der Erziehungsanstalt des Herrn Albert Woldemar Hollander zu Birkenruh am 29ten Mai 1850 (The Celebration of the 25th Anniversary of the Educational Institution of Mr Albert Woldemar Hollander at Birkenruh on 29 May 1850), Raamatud saksa keeles. Books in German, University of Tartu. Retrieved 14 January 2021
