= Anton-Detlev von Plato =

- Born: 6 June 1910
- Died: 12 October 2001 (aged 91)
- Military career
- Allegiance: Nazi Germany; West Germany
- Branch: Army (Wehrmacht)
- Rank: Oberst (Wehrmacht); Generalleutnant (Bundeswehr)
- Commands: 1st Panzer Division (Bundeswehr)
- Conflicts: World War II
- Awards: Knight's Cross of the Iron Cross

Anton-Detlev von Plato (6 June 1910 – 12 October 2001) was a German officer in the Wehrmacht during World War II and a general in the Bundeswehr. He was a recipient of the Knight's Cross of the Iron Cross of Nazi Germany.

== Awards and decorations ==
- Knight's Cross of the Iron Cross on 19 August 1944 as Oberstleutnant im Generalstab and Ia (operations officer) in the 5. Panzer-Division

Military offices
Preceded by Generalmajor Wilhelm Meyer-Detring	Commander of 1st Panzer Division (Bundeswehr); 1 October 1963 – 30 September 1966	Succeeded by Generalmajor Klaus Schubert
