= Hubert Pölz =

Austrian flying ace

- Born: 24 January 1917; Austria
- Died: 7 January 1994 (aged 76); Spain
- Military career
- Allegiance: Nazi Germany
- Branch: Luftwaffe
- Service years: 1938–1945
- Rank: Hauptmann
- Units: StG 3 and SG 151
- Commands: 6./StG 3, I/SG 151
- Conflicts: World War II
- Awards: Ritterkreuz mit Eichenlaub

Hauptmann Hubert Pölz (born 25 January 1917 – missing 7 January 1994 in Spain; declared dead in 2002) was a World War II Luftwaffe Stuka ace who flew over 1,000 missions during the war. Pölz participated in most of the German theatres of operations, taking part in the Polish Campaign, French Campaign, Battle of Britain, Siege of Malta and North African Campaign. He flew with five different rear gunners/radio operators, and was shot down four times over the course of the war. Of his 1,055 flown missions recorded on known records, 704 were in Ju 87s, and 351 were in FW 190s. He is also credited with 11 aerial victories against enemy aircraft.

== Early life ==
Hubert Pölz was born 24 January 1917 in Leonstein, Austria-Hungary. He got his pilot's license in 1935, and joined the Luftwaffe in 1938, where he received training to be a dive bomber. He joined 1st Company of the 14th Air Replacement Division on 1 October 1938. He attended Luftkriegsschule 3 (LKS 3), a military flight school, from 3 April 1940, until January 1941, when he was assigned to Staffel 6 of Sturzkampfgeschwader 2.

== World War II ==
Pölz was first deployed with the 2nd Gruppe of the Sturzkampfgeschwader 2, which he served in for over three years His first combat missions were flown from Sicily in the invasion of Malta in early February 1941. His squadron was then moved to North Africa to support Operation Sonnenblume. Pölz was promoted to lieutenant and awarded the Iron Cross 2nd class 12 April 1941. During a battle on June 24 north of Tobruk, Pölz sunk the HMS Auckland (L61) while flying a Junkers Ju 87; however he was subsequently shot down by a British Hawker Hurricane, losing his radio operator and making an emergency landing near Kambut. From late December 1941 until May 15, 1942, Pölz's squadron participated in the Siege of Malta once again, where the gruppe was renamed to the 2nd Gruppe of Sturzkampfgeschwader 3 on January 13, 1942. On 1 March 1942, he took command of the 6th Staffel of Gruppe II of Sturzkampfgeschwader 2. In May 1942, his squadron returned to Africa. While back in Africa, Pölz participated in numerous missions. On June 14, 1942, Pölz sunk a transport ship that was part of a British convoy to Alexandria while near Gavdos. Pölz was then awarded the German Cross in gold on October 2, 1942. As the North African Campaign neared its end, Pölz took part in the Battle of El Guettar, being shot down, this time by American fighters and again losing his rear gunner, on 3 April 1943, the last day of the battle. Pölz was badly wounded, having injured his leg in the crash, and spent multiple months in a military hospital. On 18 July 1943, Pölz rejoined his squadron, which had been moved to the Eastern Front. He flew multiple missions as part of Operation Citadel. His squadron participated in several battles against the Soviet Bryansk Front, during which Pölz took command of the 7th Staffel of Sturzkampfgeschwader 2 28 September 1943 and was promoted to Oberleutnant 1 October 1943. His squadron was then moved south to engage in several battles in and around southern Ukraine. On October 6, 1943, Pölz's squadron sunk three Soviet destroyers in the Black Sea, with the Soviet destroyer Kharkov potentially being sunk by Pölz himself. Pölz flew his 500th combat mission on October 11. On 18 October 1943, Schlachtgeschwader 3 formed from Sturzkampfgeschwader 3. Pölz was awarded the Knight's Cross on February 5, 1944. Pölz's gruppe was sent support Finnish forces on the Eastern Front. They were then retrained in July 1944 to fly Focke-Wulf Fw 190s, which Pölz flew for the remainder of his Luftwaffe career. After retraining, his group was sent to provide support to German troops trapped in the Courland Pocket. Pölz flew more than 200 missions in the Baltic region from July 24 through November 22 of 1944. 25 November 1944, Pölz was awarded the Knight's Cross of the Iron Cross with Oak Leaves and promoted to Hauptmann and assigned to command I Gruppe of Schlachtgeschwader 151. He surrendered with his unit to British forces, in Denmark, on 8 May 1945.

== Later life ==
After the war's end, Pölz went on become successful in the aviation industry. In 1950, Pölz founded Österreichische Fahrzeugbaugesellschaft m.b.H. (ÖFAG), which he in 1976 he was the sole owner of. Pölz was became a reserve captain in the Bundesluftwaffe in 1961. He eventually retired from the Austrian armed forces as a reserve major. Hubert Pölz went missing while swimming on a vacation in Spain on 7 January 1994; he was never found and was declared dead in 2002.

== Awards ==
- Iron Cross (1939)
  - 2nd Class (12 April 1941)
  - 1st Class (18 October 1941)
- Honor Goblet of the Luftwaffe on 15 June 1942 as Leutnant and pilot
- German Cross in Gold on 25 September 1942 as Leutnant in the III./Sturzkampfgeschwader 3
- Knight's Cross of the Iron Cross with Oak Leaves
  - Knight's Cross on 5 February 1944 as Leutnant of the reserve and Staffelführer of the 7./Sturzkampfgeschwader 3 (Note: Accordnign to Scherzer as Leutnant (war officer).)
  - 661st Oak Leaves on 25 November 1944 as Hauptmann and acting Gruppenkommandeur of the I./Schlachtgeschwader 151
