= Walter von Boetticher =

German historian (1853–1945)

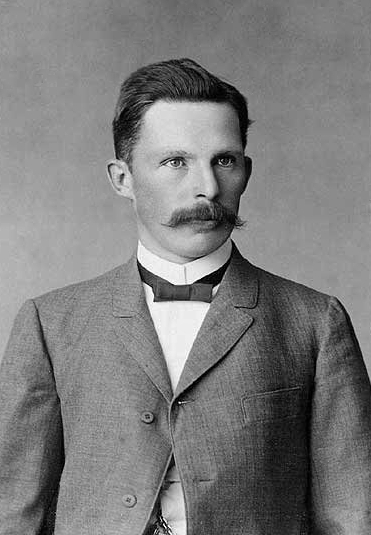
- Born: 11 December 1853; Riga, Russian Empire
- Died: 3 July 1945 (aged 91); Radebeul, Allied-occupied Germany
- Occupations: historian and physician

Walter von Boetticher (11 December 1853 – 3 July 1945) was a German historian, genealogist and physician.

Walter von Boetticher was born in Riga, Latvia, the son of the art historian Friedrich von Boetticher (1826–1902) and his wife Eugenie Mitschke (1825–1858). After attending the Dresden Kreuzgymnasium (School of the Cross), he studied medicine at Würzburg, Marburg and Jena from 1873 to 1877, receiving his doctorate in 1878 with the thesis Über Reflexhemmung (On Reflex Inhibition). He then worked as a general practitioner at Bertelsdorf in Bavaria, and Stolpen and Göda in Saxony.

Boetticher's first works on regional history date to the 1870s. After he moved to Bautzen in 1905 he concentrated exclusively on historical research, which he continued after he moved to Dresden in 1908, and to the Oberlößnitz district of Radebeul in 1912. At Oberlößnitz he lived at Villa Oswald Haenel, which had been designed by and was home to Oswald Haenel, who had died the year before.

He published numerous essays on the history of Upper Lusatia and its nobility, and, between 1912 and 1923, his life's work the Geschichte des Oberlausitzischen Adels und seiner Güter 1635–1815 (History of the Upper Lusatian Nobility and its Estates 1635–1815), which was published in four volumes. In 1904 Boetticher was entered in the Saxon Adelsmatrikel (Register of nobility), and in 1905 was made an honorary member of the Oberlausitzische Gesellschaft der Wissenschaften (Upper Lusatian Society of Sciences). In 1907 he became an honorary knight of the Order of St John. In 1929 he received an honorary doctorate from the University of Breslau, and received the Goethe-Medaille für Kunst und Wissenschaft (Goethe Medal for Art and Science) in 1943 on his 90th birthday.

In 1880 Boetticher married Isabella Wippermann (1859–1943), daughter to the landowner Hermann Anton Wippermann of Weddelbrook in Holstein, with whom he had four children. Boetticher died on 3 July 1945 at Radebeul and was interred in the municipal cemetery at Bautzen.

In 1952 his son, Friedrich von Boetticher, bequeathed the Sammlung Boetticher (Boetticher Collection) to the Herder-Institut in Marburg. It contains 230 bibliographical titles, some in several volumes, from his father's original history library, including the complete Lusatian Magazine in 25 volumes from 1768, and the New Lusatian Magazine from 1822 to 1941.

== Works and essays ==
- Über reflexhemmung (On reflex inhibition), 1878
- Nachrichten über die Familie von Boetticher. Kurländische Linie, 1891
- Die Schloßkapelle zu Bautzen. In: Neues Lausitzisches Magazin, Volume 70, 1894, p. 25 ff.
- Stammbücher im Besitz oberlausitzischer Bibliotheken. Offprint from Berlin Sittenfeld Quarterly Journal, 1896
- Beiträge zur Geschichte des Franziskanerklosters zu Kamenz, Kamenz 1896
- Die Rügengerichte auf den Ortschaften des Domstifts St Petri zu Bautzen, in the Festschrift on the occasion of the 70th birthday of Friedrich Heinrich von Boetticher, Monse 1896
- Die Rügengerichte in Görlitz und Löbau, in Neues Lausitzisches Magazin, Volume 73, pp. 202–247, 1897
- Ernst Theodor Stöckhardt in Leopoldina, Booklet 34, pp. 88–91, 1898
- Stammbuchblätter Oberlausitzischer Gelehrter vorzugsweise des 17. Jahrhunderts, Offprint from Neues Lausitzisches Magazin, 1898
- Freikäufe oberlausitzischer Dörfer, Offprint from Neues Lausitzisches Magazin, 1899
- Geschichte des Oberlausitzischen Adels und seiner Güter 1635–1815, 4 Volumes, 1912–1923
- Zigeuner in Bautzen und Umgebung in Bautzener Geschichtshefte, Volume 3, Issue 1, pp. 31–35, 1925
- "Der Adel des Görlitzer Weichbildes um die Wende des 14. und 15. Jahrhunderts," in Neues Lausitzisches Magazin, Volume 104, pp. 1–304, 1928
- Der Görlitzer Schriftsteller Johann Friedrich Dietrich, in Neues Lausitzisches Magazin, Volume 109, pp. 199–212, 1933

== Publications ==
- Andert, Frank; Stadtlexikon Radebeul. Historisches Handbuch für die Lößnitz, published by the Radebeul City Archive, modified edition 2, 2006. ISBN 3-938460-05-9
