= 6th Mountain Division (Wehrmacht) =

- German: 6. Gebirgs-Division
- Unit insignia
- Active: June 1940 – 8 May 1945
- Country: Nazi Germany
- Branch: German Army
- Type: Gebirgsjäger
- Role: Mountain warfare
- Size: Division
- Engagements: World War II

Commanders
- Notable commanders: Ferdinand Schörner

The 6th Mountain Division (German: 6. Gebirgs-Division) was a German army Division of World War II. It was established in June 1940, and was deployed to France for occupation duties. In December it was relocated to Poland, where it remained until the spring of 1941. Having formed XVIII Mountain Corps with the 5th Mountain Division, it then took part in Operation Marita, the invasion of Greece during the Balkans Campaign. In September it was relocated to northern Finland, where it operated in Lapland (west of Murmansk). From July 1942 onward it was part of the 20th Mountain Army along the Arctic coast. It withdrew into Norway when the Germans evacuated Finland in late 1944, and surrendered to the British at the end of the war in 1945.

== Commanding officers ==
- Generalmajor Ferdinand Schörner (1 June 1940 - 1 February 1942)
- Generalleutnant Christian Philipp (1 February 1942 - 20 August 1944)
- Generalmajor Max-Josef Pemsel (20 August 1944 - 19 April 1945)
- Oberst Josef Remold (20 April 1945 - capitulation)

== Order of battle ==
As of 1 June 1940 (day of formation):

- 141st Gebirgsjäger Regiment
- 143rd Gebirgsjäger Regiment
- 118th Mountain Artillery Regiment
- 112th Reconnaissance Battalion
- 47th Panzerjäger Battalion
- 91st Pioneer Battalion
- 91st Signals Battalion
- 91st Divisional Support Units

As of January 1941:

- 141st Gebirgsjäger Regiment
- 143rd Gebirgsjäger Regiment
- 112th (tmot) Reconnaissance Battalion
- 47th Panzerjäger Battalion
- 85th Light (Luftwaffe) FlaK Battery
- 118th Mountain Artillery Regiment
- Gebirgs-Pionier-Battalion 91
- 91st Signals Battalion
- Divisional Service Troops
