= Max-Josef Pemsel =

German general (1897–1985)

Max-Josef Johann Pemsel
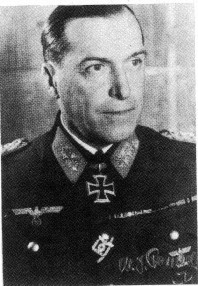
- Born: 15 January 1897; Regensburg, Bavaria
- Died: 30 June 1985 (aged 88); Munich, Bavaria
- Burial place: Nordfriedhof, Munich
- Military career
- Allegiance: German Empire; Weimar Republic; Nazi Germany; West Germany
- Branch: Bavarian Army (1916–1919); Reichsheer (1919–1935); Heer (1935–1945); Bundeswehr (1956–1961)
- Service years: 1916–1945, 1956–1961
- Rank: Generalleutnant
- Conflicts: World War I World War II
- Awards: Knight's Cross of the Iron Cross etc.

Max-Josef Pemsel (15 January 1897 – 30 June 1985) was a Generalleutnant in the German Army during Second World War. After the war he became one of the very few senior officers who served in the Wehrmacht to serve in the West German Army.

== Life and career ==
Born on 15 January 1897 in Regensburg, Bavaria, Pemsel entered the Bavarian Army during the First World War in April 1916 as a volunteer. He was assigned to the 11th Reserve Infantry Regiment, with which he saw action at the Western Front. On 30 April 1918 Pemsel was promoted to lieutenant. After the Armistice, Pemsel remained in the shrunken German Reichswehr. In 1935 Pemsel became a staff officer in the 1st Mountain Division.

During the Second World War he fought in various theaters. In 1941 during the Invasion of Yugoslavia he was the chief of staff of the XVIII Gebirgskorps. By 1944 he had been promoted to lieutenant-general and made chief of staff of the 7th Army under Generaloberst Friedrich Dollmann, during which coordinated the first German response to Operation Overlord. In August 1944 Pemsel was transferred to Finland and given command of the 6th Mountain Division, a command he held until 19 April 1945. On 9 December 1944 Pemsel was awarded the Knight's Cross of the Iron Cross. In April 1945 Pemsel was transferred to Italy, where he became chief of staff of the Ligurien Armee. He surrendered on 26 April 1945 and remained a prisoner of war until April 1948.

On 26 April 1956 Pemsel entered the Bundeswehr in the rank of a major-general and was given command of Wehrbereich VI ("6th Military District") based at Munich. On 1 April 1957 he was promoted to commanding general of the II Corps, stationed in Ulm. On 30 January 1958 he was promoted to lieutenant-general.

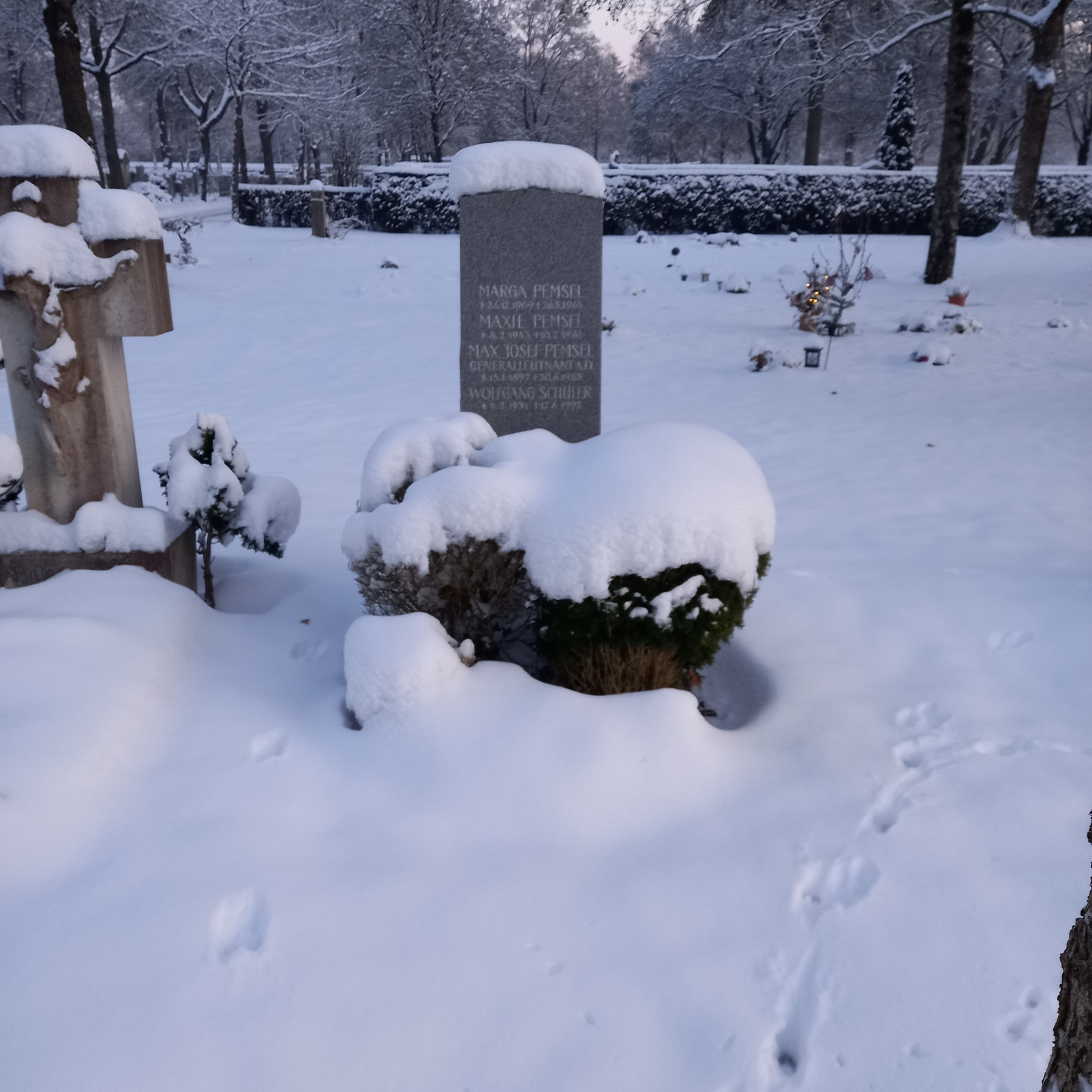
The grave of Max-Josef Pemsel and his wife in the family grave in the Nordfriedhof cemetery in Munich

Pemsel retired on 30 September 1961 and died on 30 June 1985 in Munich.

Pemsel was a military consultant to the makers of the 1962 film The Longest Day, in which he was portrayed by Wolfgang Preiss.
