= Cross pattée =

Heraldic symbol

Standard form of the cross pattée

A cross pattée or cross patty (French: croix pattée, German: Tatzenkreuz), also known as a cross formée or cross formy, or even a Templar cross, is a type of Christian cross with arms that are narrow at the centre and often flared in a curve or straight line shape to be broader at the perimeter. The form appears very early in medieval art, for example, in a metalwork treasure binding given to Monza Cathedral by Lombard queen Theodelinda (died 628) and the 8th-century lower cover of the Lindau Gospels in the Morgan Library. An early English example from the start of the age of heraldry proper (i.e., about 1200) is found in the arms of Baron Berkeley.

== Etymology ==
The word pattée is a French adjective in the feminine form used in its full context as la croix pattée, meaning literally "footed cross", from the noun patte, meaning literally foot, generally that of an animal. The cross has four splayed feet, each akin to the foot, for example, of a chalice or candelabrum. In German it is called Tatzenkreuz from Tatze, foot, paw. Planché provides a dubious suggestion that the term comes from the Latin verb pateo, to lie open, be spread. He states it to be discernible on the standard of King Stephen (1135–1154).

== Variants ==
Several variants exist as follows:

A sample of variants of the cross pattée
Image	Description
	Best known for its use as the Iron Cross, based on the Leechkirche of the Teutonic Order (image), used as a symbol of the German Empire that was present in its War Ensign and war materiel, including on Luftstreitkräfte aircraft until April 1918 when the Balkenkreuz was introduced.
	A cross pattée with a sharp point added to the lower limb, as if for use in staking into the ground, but used to represent a sword in the Cross of Saint James (also known as "sword cross").
	With less curvature, used by the Knights Templar, and later on Luftstreitkräfte aircraft until April 1918, and the basis for the similar cross used by the armed forces of modern Germany, the Bundeswehr.
	With the edges of the arms concave throughout. Bolnisi cross, official national symbol of the republic of Georgia, used on flag, coat of arms and various official and unofficial organizations of this country.
	With the ends of the arms convex and curved; sometimes called cross alisée (French: croix pattée alésée arrondie, lit. 'rounded reamed patté cross').
	With all edges straight, forming triangular arms which come close to filling a square. One example is an artistic variant of the cross pattee components in the Sancroft arms, seen thrice in the ecclesiastical coat of arms of William Sancroft (1617–1693), Archbishop of Canterbury in a mid-1740s stained glass at St Lawrence's Church, Mereworth.
	With triangular arms that do not fill the square, used on flag, coat of arms and various medals, also known as the Saint George's Cross in Sweden and the Cossack cross in Ukraine.
	With straight parallel lines at the centre, it still fits the general definition of "having branches that widen by curving at their ends", and is considered pattée in Rudolf Koch's The Book of Signs (German: Das Zeichenbuch).

== Use in crowns ==
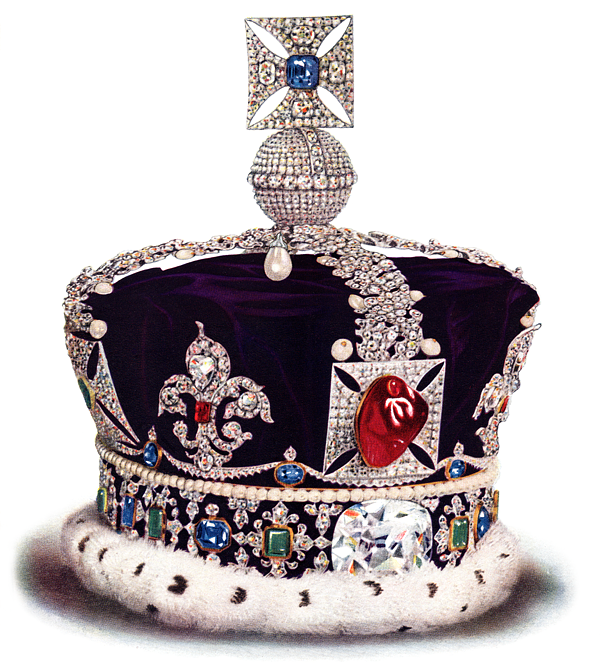
The Imperial State Crown of the United Kingdom

Many crowns worn by monarchs have jewelled crosses pattées mounted atop the band. Most crowns possess at least four such crosses, from which the half arches rise. Some crowns are designed so that the half-arches can be detached, allowing the circlet to be worn separately on occasion.

A cross pattée is particularly associated with crowns in Christian countries. It is often heavily jewelled, with diamonds and precious stones. The Koh-i-Noor diamond is set in a cross pattée on the Crown of Queen Elizabeth the Queen Mother. The British Imperial State Crown has a base of four crosses pattée alternating with four fleurs-de-lis. A cross pattée on the Imperial State Crown holds the Black Prince's Ruby. The cross pattée also features in many of the other British Crowns including the St Edward's Crown, used for coronations, and the Imperial Crown of India created for George V as Emperor of India to wear at the Delhi Durbar of 1911.

== Use by Crusaders, Prussia, and Germany ==
=== Teutonic Knights ===
This cross is often associated with the Crusades. The heraldic cross pattée was sometimes used by the Teutonic Knights, a Crusader order, though their more usual emblem was a plain straight black cross on white field.

Emblem of the Teutonic Order

=== Iron Cross ===
In 1813, King Frederick William III of Prussia established the Iron Cross as a decoration for military valor, and it remained in use, in various forms, by Prussia and later Germany until 1945. A stylized version of the Iron Cross is used to date by the German military (Bundeswehr) as its symbol of nationality, and is found on vehicles, aircraft and publications.

Prussian and Imperial German Landwehr and Landsturm troops used a Cross Pattée cap badge to distinguish them from regular army troops. A stylized version of the Cross Pattée is used by the modern German military as its symbol of nationality, and is found on vehicles, aircraft and publications, with no border of any kind at the ends of each arm (as was the case with the Balkenkreuz used on German aircraft in 1918–1945).

German Iron Cross

Modern Bundeswehr emblem

== Modern usage ==
=== Belarus ===
The cross pattée is adopted in several municipal coats of arms of Belarus.

Coat of arms of Klichaw

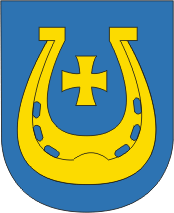
Coat of arms of Kruhlaye

Coat of arms of Krychaw

Coat of arms of Orsha

=== Canada ===
The cross pattée, a traditional Royal symbol in Canada, has been incorporated into official national symbols, provincial symbols and the insignia of various national armed forces. The Arms of Canada, numerous provincial coat of arms and the badges of the Canadian Forces feature St Edward's Crown; that displays four cross pattée and four fleur-de-lys, supporting two dipped arches topped by a monde and another cross pattée. Numerous orders, decorations, and medals of Canada are designed with a cross pattée, including the nation's highest civilian honour, the Order of Merit and the Victoria Cross of Canada the highest military honour that is derived from that of the British original Victoria Cross.

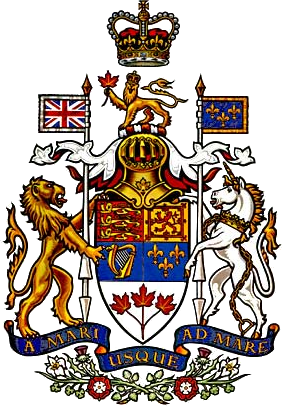
Arms of Canada (1957 rendition)

Coat of arms of Québec (1939–2026)

Badge of the Canadian Forces

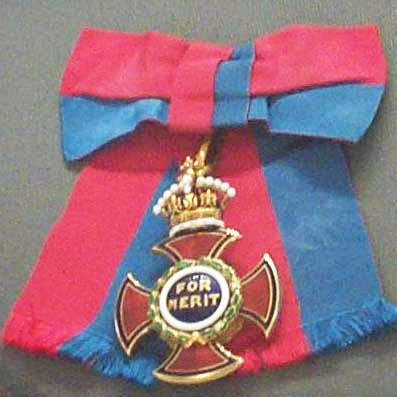
Order of Merit

=== France ===
The cross pattée can be found on coats of arms of various French communes.

Coat of arms of Ambacourt

Coat of arms of Damouzy

Coat of arms of Fontaine-lès-Luxeuil

Coat of arms of Fontaines-Saint-Martin

Coat of arms of Saint-Gondon

=== Georgia ===
The Bolnisi cross (Georgian: ბოლნისის ჯვარი bolnisis ǰvari) is a cross symbol, taken from a 5th-century ornament at the Bolnisi Sioni church, which came to be used as one of the oldest national symbol of Georgia. It was used on the flags and coat of arms of the Kingdom of Georgia and the current Republic of Georgia, with its various organizations and administrative divisions.

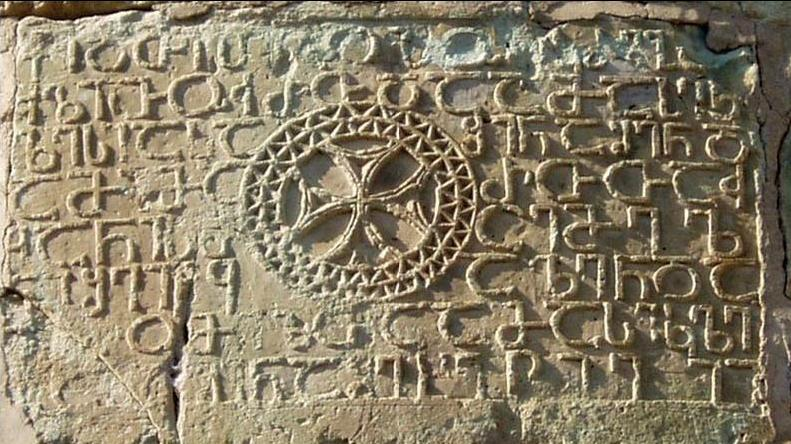
Bolnisi Sioni inscriptions. Oldest Georgian inscription that uses the Asomtavruli script, predating the modern Mkhedruli script, inside Georgia

Flag of Georgia

Coat of arms of Georgia

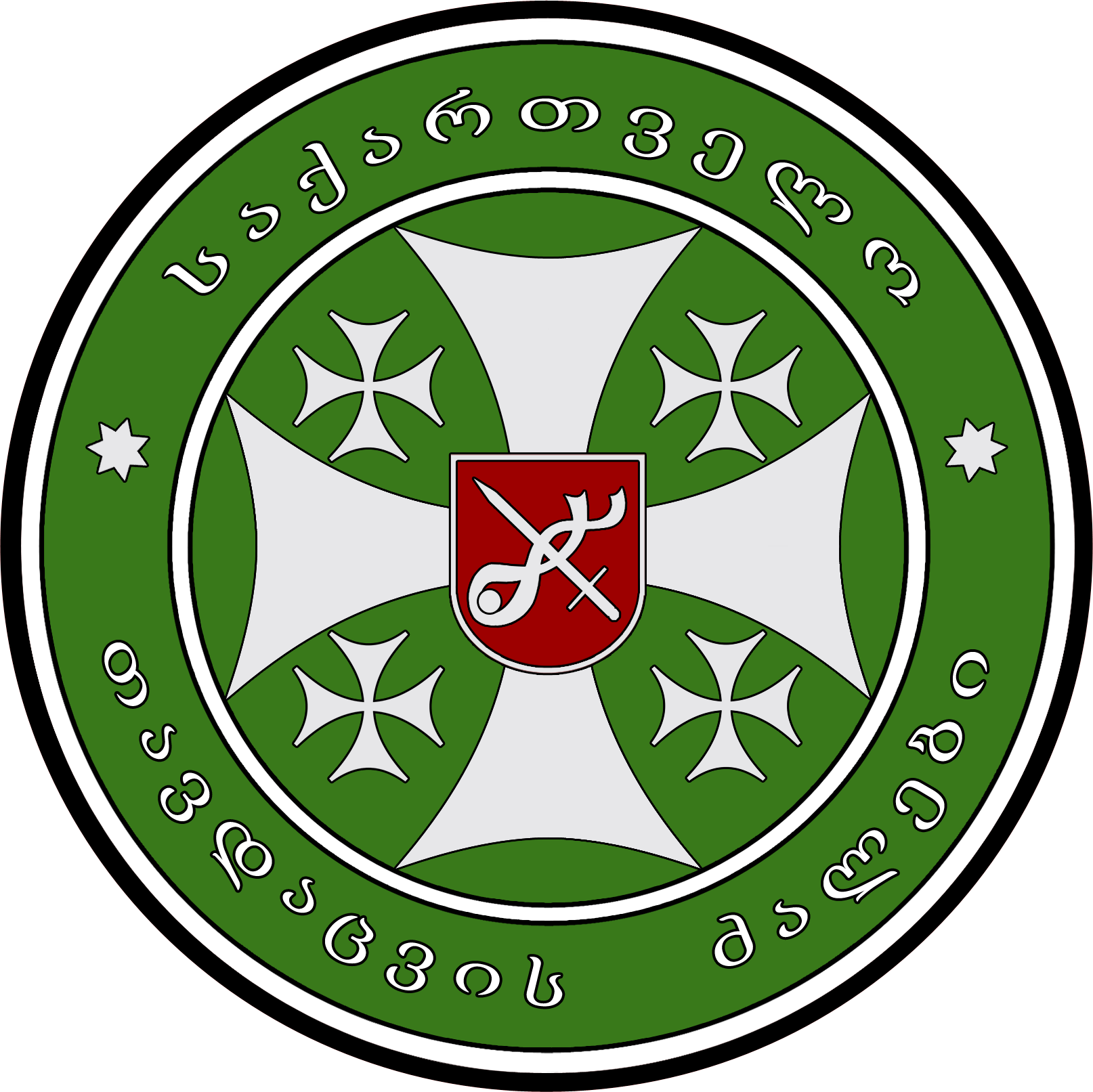
Roundel of the Georgian Defense Forces

Coat of arms of the city of Bolnisi

=== Latvia ===
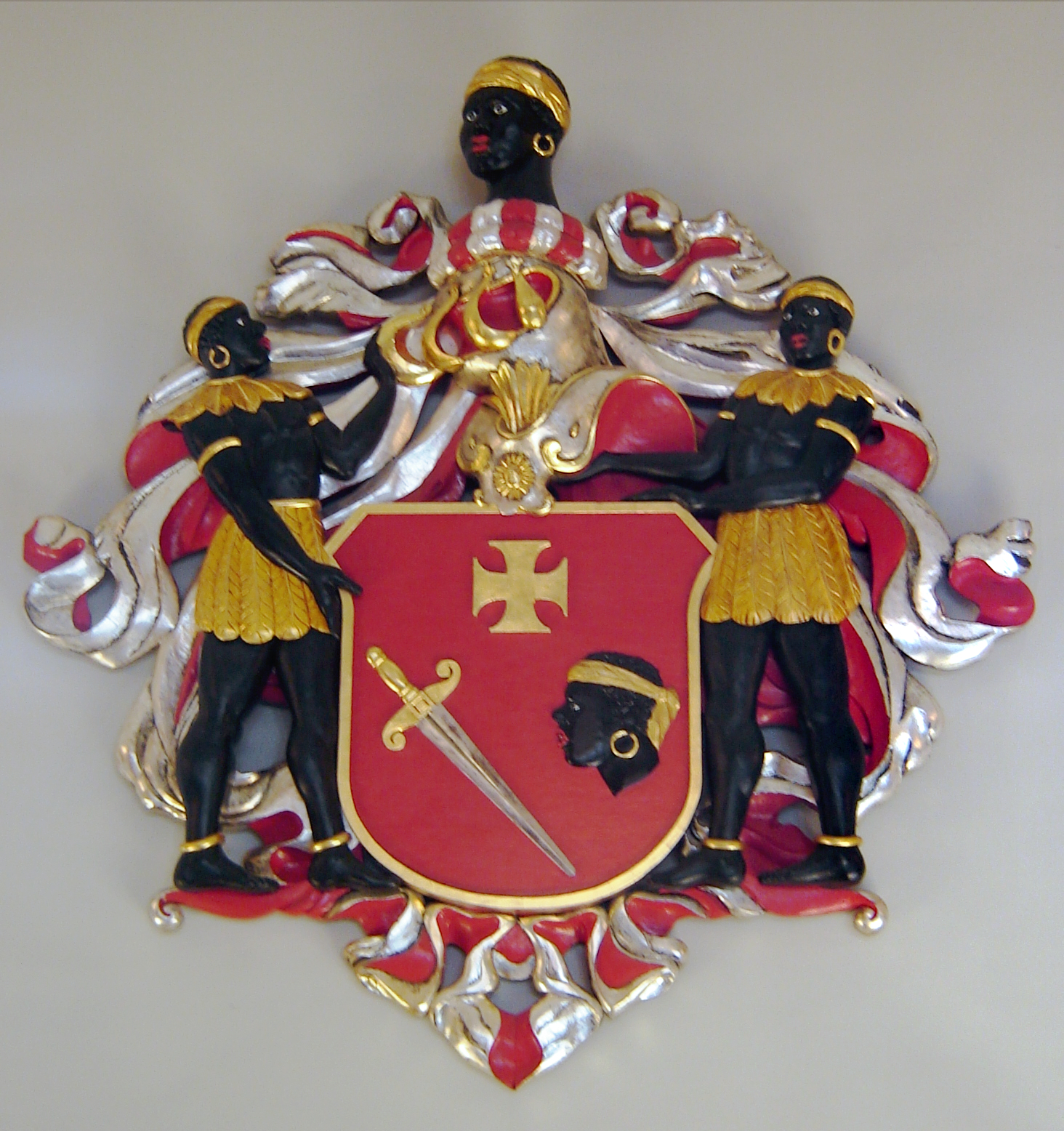
Coat of arms of the Brotherhood of Blackheads shown in the House of the Blackheads, Riga

Coat of arms of Riga

Coat of arms of Ventspils

=== Montenegro ===
The Montenegrin cross-flag (Krstaš-barjak) has been used in Montenegro since medieval times to represent the state, and lately its military divisions. Use of this flag was first recorded in 1687. During the 1990s, it was used as a symbol of Montenegrin independence movement, most notably by the Liberal Alliance of Montenegro. Nowadays, Montenegro's Royal Capital City Cetinje uses krstaš flag as its flag. It is also used as an unofficial alternate Montenegrin flag, as well as by local trademarks and societies related to Montenegro.

Flag of the Prince-Bishopric of Montenegro

Montenegrin flag used in the Battle of Vučji Do. The Н.I. initials indicate Prince Nicholas I. One of the most important historical Montenegrin flags.

Flag of Old Royal Capital Cetinje

Coat of arms of Nikšić Municipality

Modern Montenegrin Air Force roundel

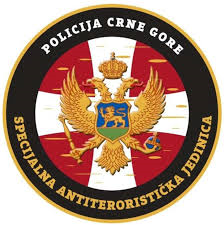
Montenegrin Police Special Counter-Terrorist Unit Insignia

Flag of Montenegrins of Serbia

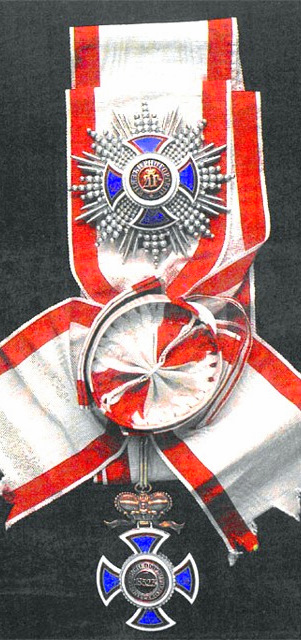
Order of Prince Danilo I

=== Poland ===
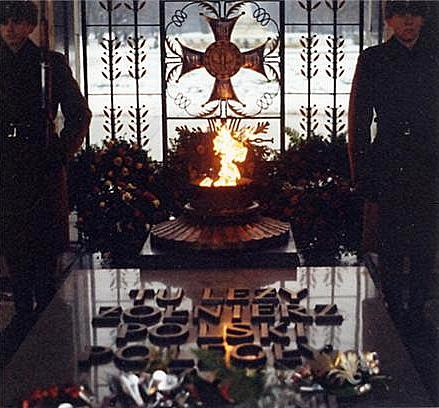
Guards at Poland's Tomb of the Unknown Soldier, Warsaw. Behind them, the Virtuti Militari emblem.

Coat of arms of Podkarpackie Voivodeship

Coat of arms of Przemyśl

Coat of arms of Rzeszów

Coat of arms of Skierniewice

=== Portugal ===
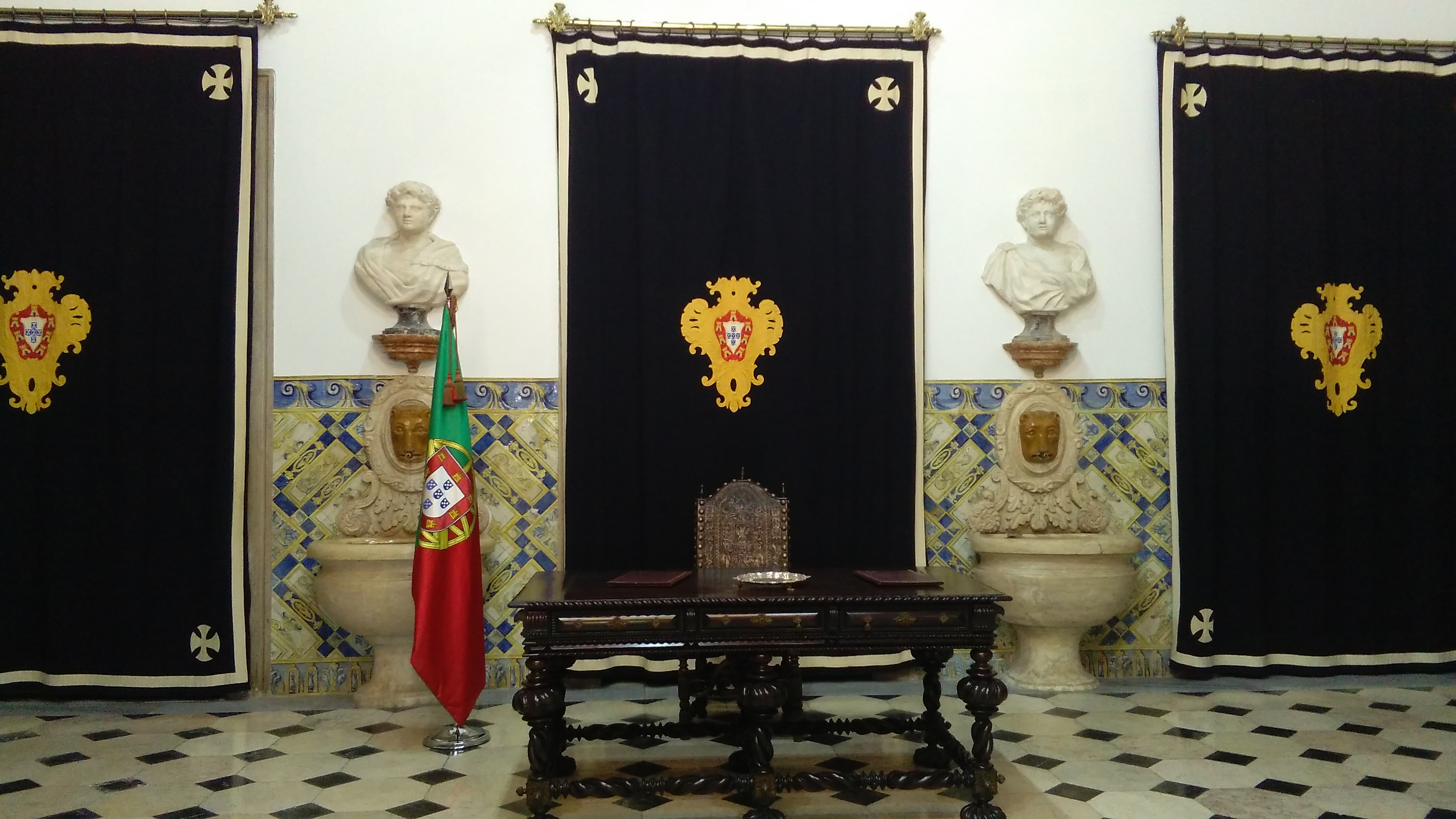
Black tapestries used in Belém Palace with a golden cross alisée in each corner

The Portuguese heraldry makes a very common use of three variants of the cross pattée, the standard form (also as a variant of the Maltese cross proper, associated with the Knights Hospitaller), the alisée form (associated with the Knights Templar) and the Order of Christ cross (associated with this order of chivalry and also used as one of the main national symbols of Portugal). These crosses are often present on the arms of the municipalities located in former domains of these orders.

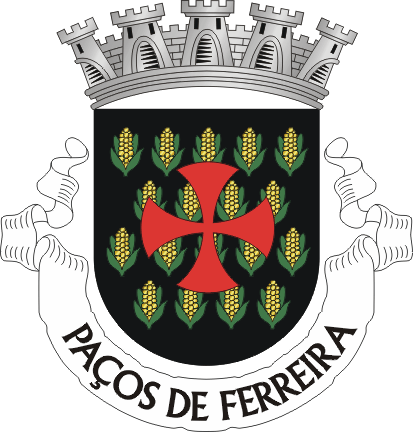
Coat of arms of Paços de Ferreira

Coat of arms of Madeira

Roundel of the Portuguese Air Force

=== Russia ===
The cross pattée is adopted by Russian Border Service, it is also found on coats of arms of some Russian regions.

Emblem of the Border Service

Coat of arms of Kaliningrad

Coat of arms of Kirov Oblast

Coat of Arms of Perm Krai

Coat of arms of Borisovka, Belgorod Oblast

The cross alisée version of the cross pattée, with rounded edges, has been used in Russia since the 19th century. This cross shape was used in the badges of the Narodnoe Opolcheniye, during the Patriotic War of 1812 and the Crimean War as well as the Aleksandrovskoe Military School. Although it was not used for decorations before, in the modern-day Russian Federation, the cross alisée was adopted for the Order of Courage, as well as for other emblems such as the logo of the Wagner Group.

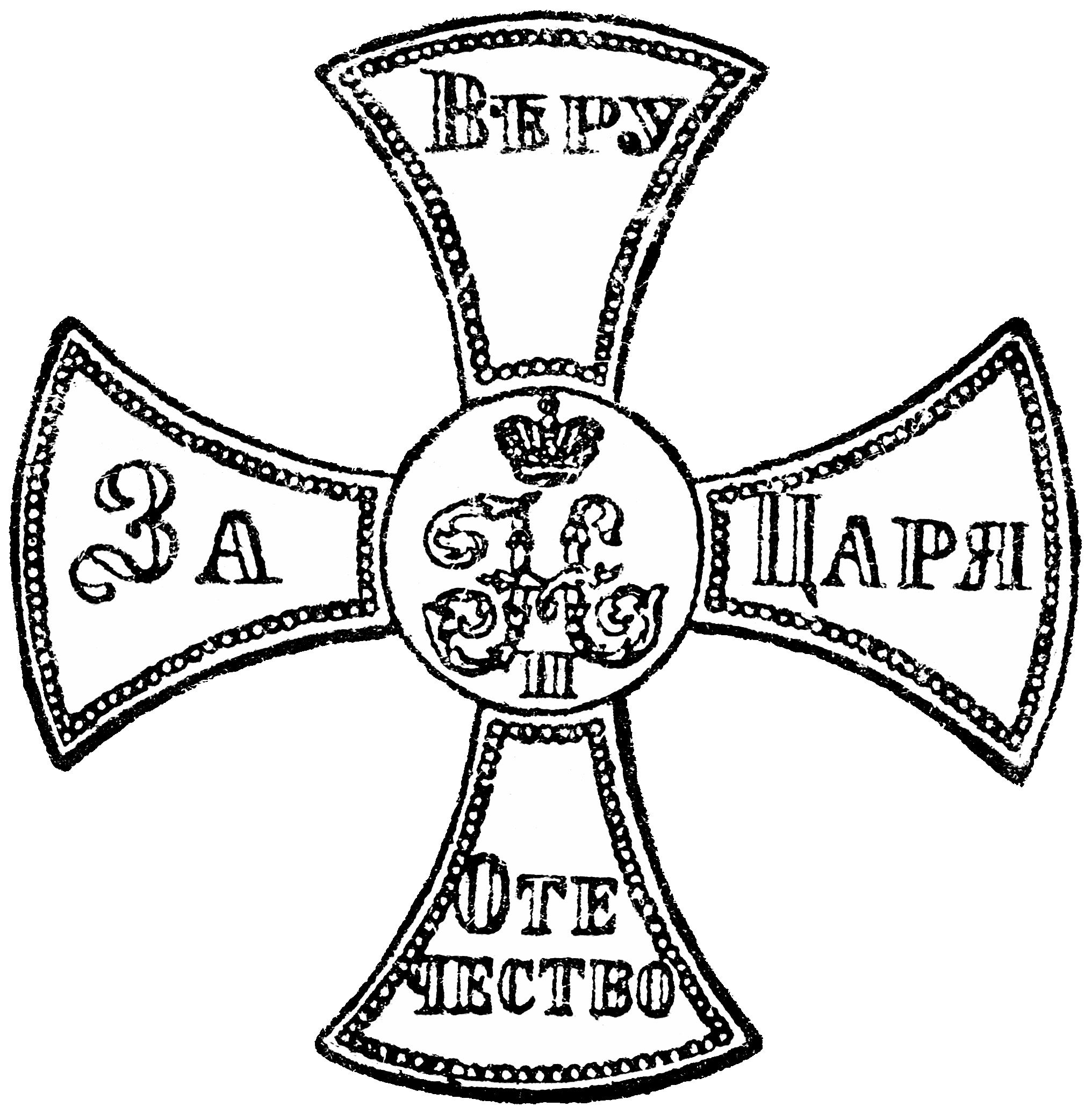
Narodnoe Opolcheniye badge, 1903 version

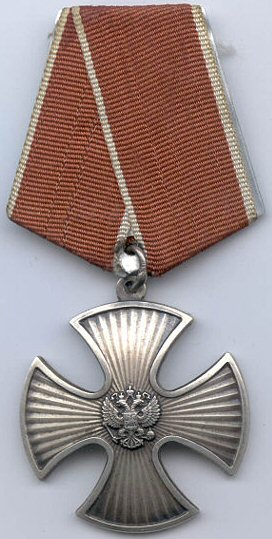
Order of Courage

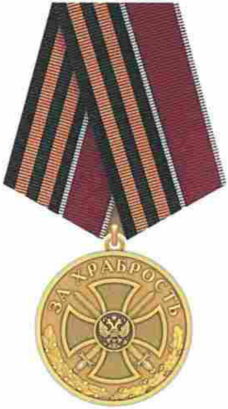
Medal "For Bravery"

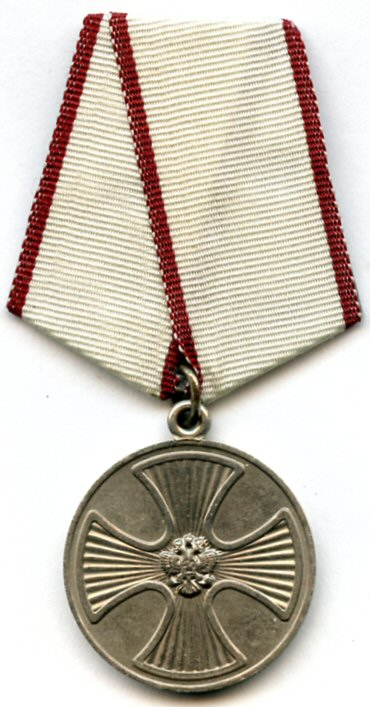
Medal "For Life Saving"

=== Spain ===
Coat of arms of El Bierzo

Coat of arms of Mondoñedo

Coat of arms of Morcín

Coat of arms of Oviedo

Coat of arms of Priorat

Coat of arms of Sabiñánigo

Coat of arms of Sitges

Coat of arms of Villafáfila

=== Sweden ===
In Sweden, the term "Saint George's Cross" sometimes refers to the cross pattée used by Swedish Freemasons. For example, the cross of the Swedish Order of Freemasons was defined by the King of Sweden in 1928 to be a "red St George's cross with triangular arms".

Flag of the Swedish Order of Freemasons

Coat of arms of the Swedish Order of Freemasons

=== Ukraine ===
In Ukraine, the cossack cross was used historically on banners by cossacks, installed on their graves, and nowadays part of emblems of a number of Ukrainian state bodies connected with security, including the Armed Forces of Ukraine.

Flag of the Zaporizhian Sich (16th–18th century) and Danubian Sich (17th–18th century)

Coat of arms of the Myrhorod regiment of the Cossack Hetmanate (1625–1782)

Emblem of the Ministry of Defence of Ukraine

=== United Kingdom ===
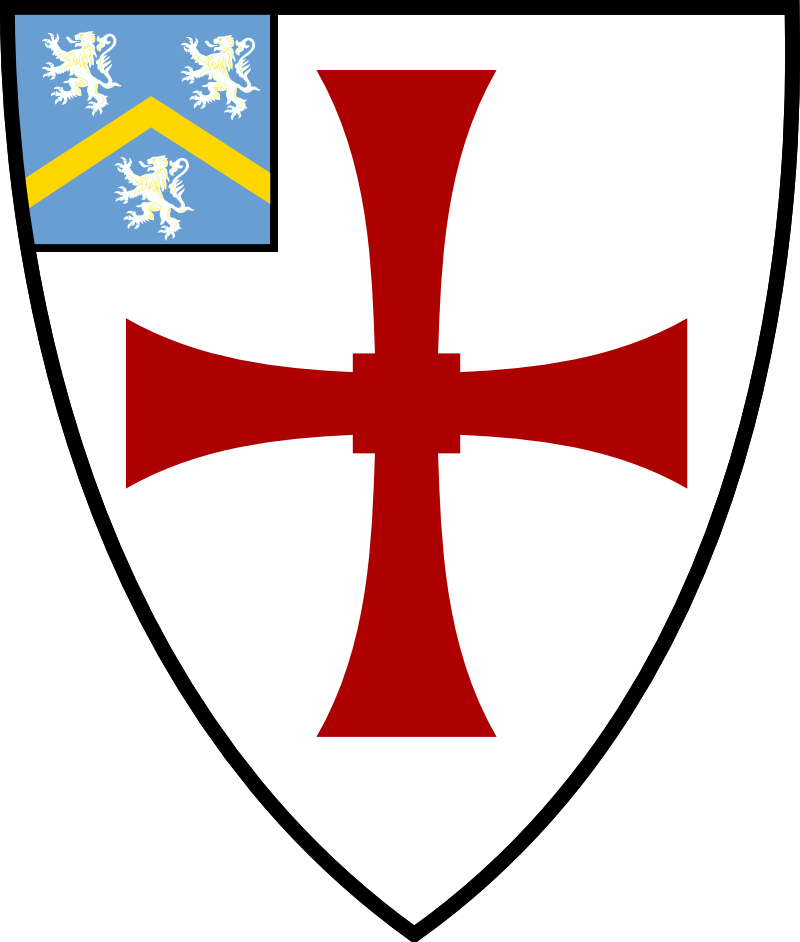
Coat of arms of the University of Durham

Coat of arms of the College of St Hild and St Bede, Durham

Coat of arms of John Snow College, Durham

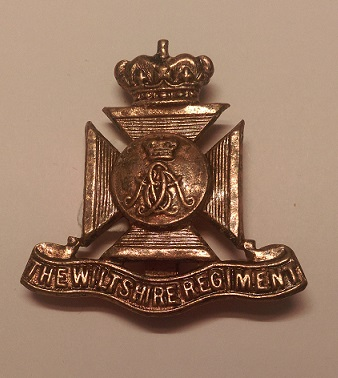
Wiltshire Regiment cap badge

=== United States ===
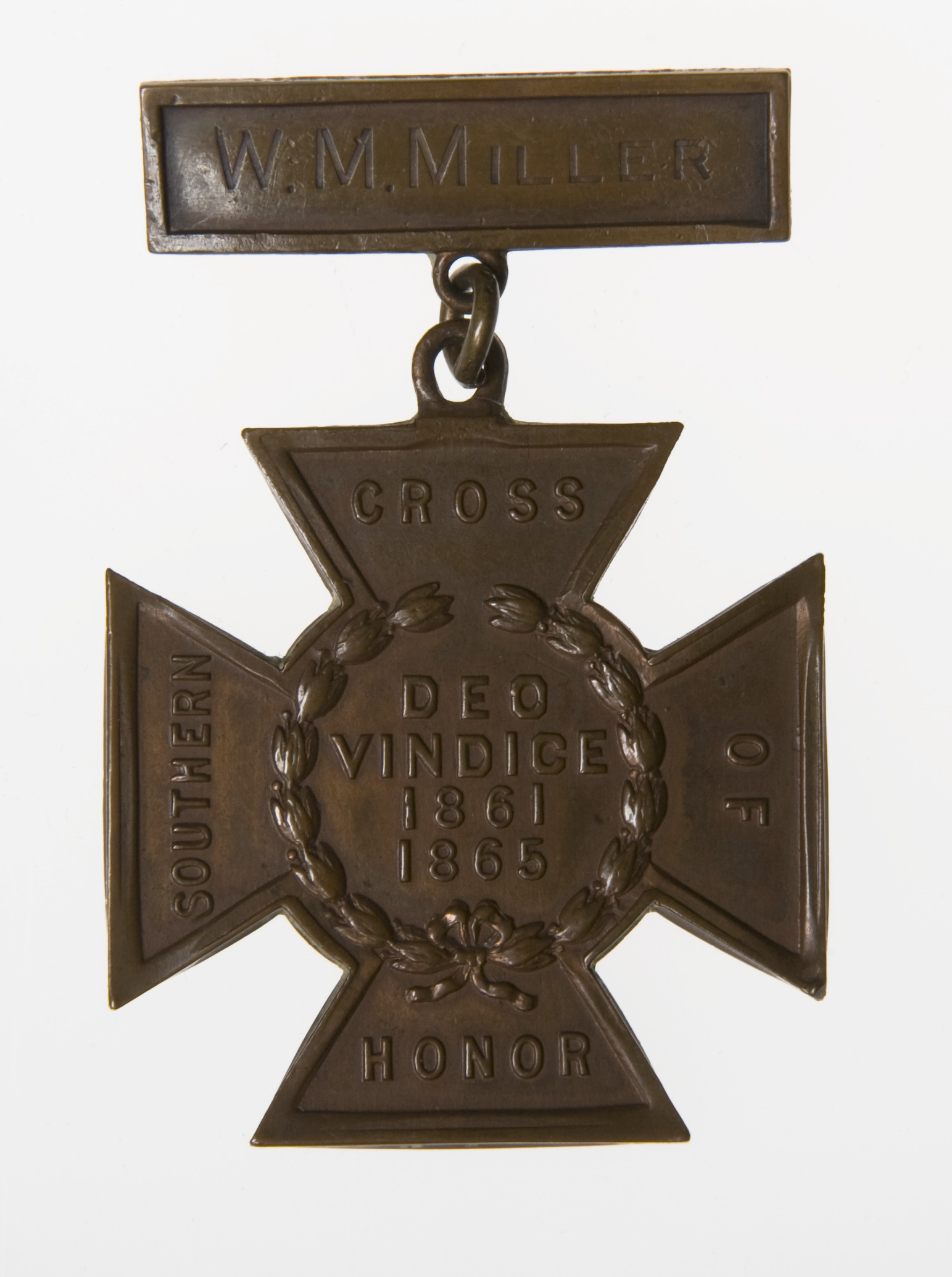
Southern Cross of Honor, used to honor Confederate Veterans

== Encoding ==
In Unicode, a cross pattée character is encoded under the name "Maltese cross" in the Dingbats range at code point U+2720 (✠).
See also:

- Cross patty with right crossbar at code point U+2E51 (⹐)
- Cross patty with left crossbar at code point U+2E52 (⹑)

These are both in the Supplemental Punctuation Unicode block.

== See also ==
- Crosses in heraldry
