= Cossack cross =

Cross pattée symbol used by Cossacks and Ukraine

A Cossack cross on the flag of Poltava Oblast

A Cossack cross on the flag of Volyn Oblast

The Cossack cross (Ukrainian: Козацький хрест, romanized: Kozatskyi khrest) is a type of cross pattée historically linked to the Cossacks. Today, it is best known for its use by the Ukrainian Armed Forces. It is also used in Ukraine as a memorial symbol for fallen soldiers and in military awards.

== History ==
Historically it was used by Cossacks, most prominently the Zaporozhian Host.

In modern times the cross has been adapted as part of the emblem of the Armed Forces of Ukraine, the State Emergency Service of Ukraine, the State Border Guard Service of Ukraine and the Security Service of Ukraine, and is depicted on the flags and coat of arms of several Ukrainian regions, districts and cities, like Konotop, Zinkiv and Zolotonosha. The Memorial to Ukrainians shot at Sandarmokh uses a Cossack cross.

=== Russo-Ukrainian War ===
As of September 2022 during the Russian invasion of Ukraine, Ukrainian forces started to paint a simplified white Cossack cross on their vehicles as an IFF marker designating Ukrainian vehicles from a distance.

== Examples ==
Flag of the Zaporozhian Sich

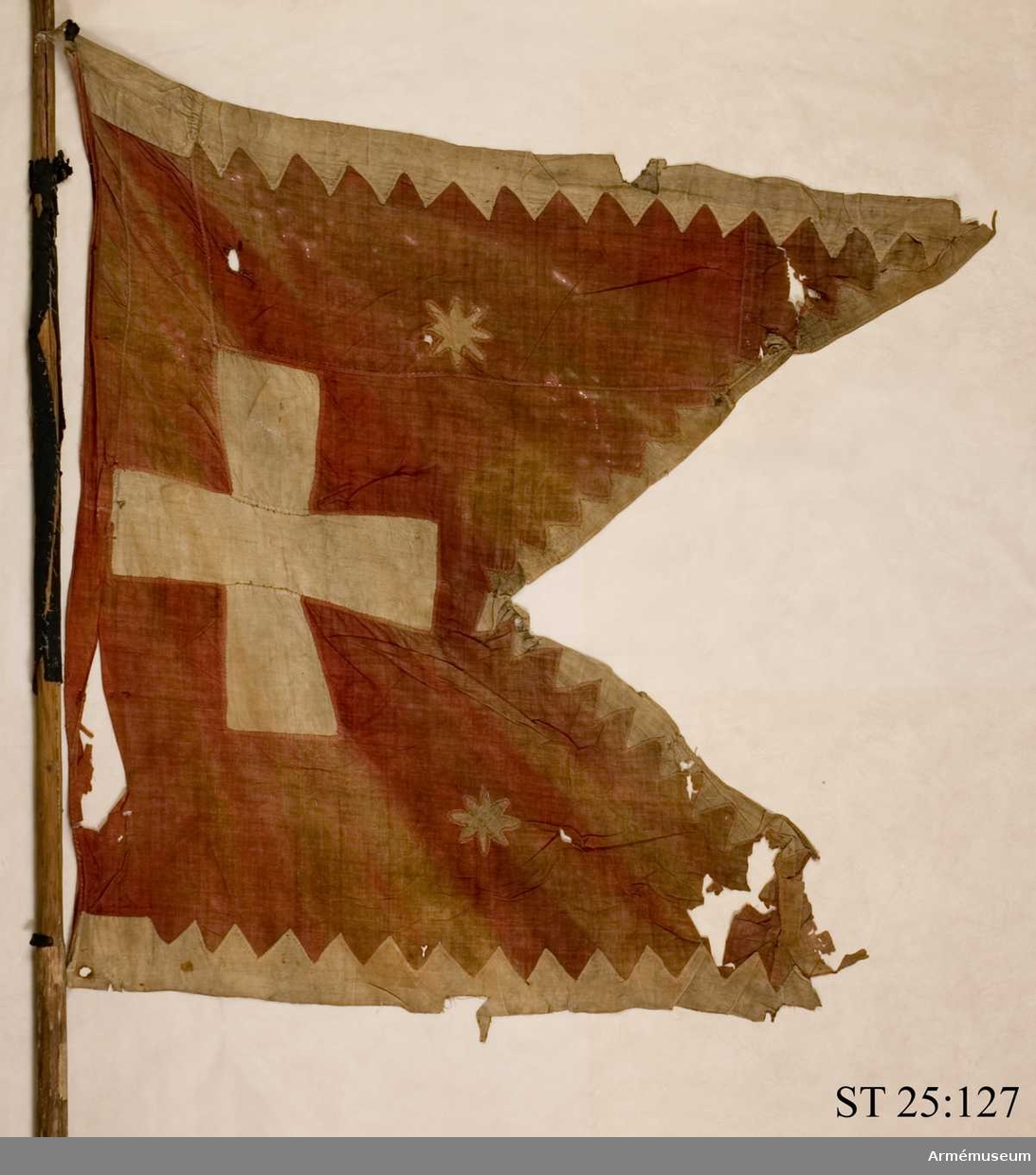
Historical Cossack flag from 1651 exhibited in the Armémuseum in Stockholm

Emblem of the Ukrainian Armed Forces

Emblem of the State Border Guard Service of Ukraine

Security Service of Ukraine Emblem

State Service of Ukraine for Emergencies

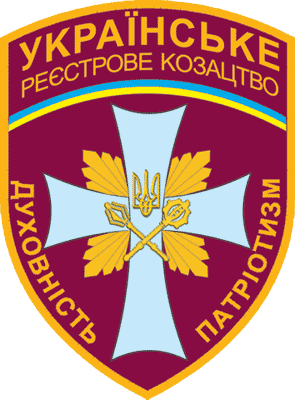
The Ukrainian Registered Cossacks

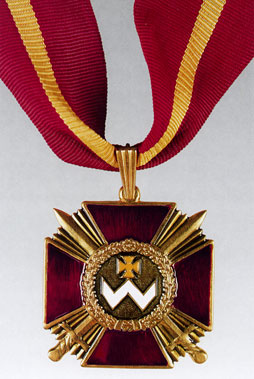
Order of Bohdan Khmelnytsky

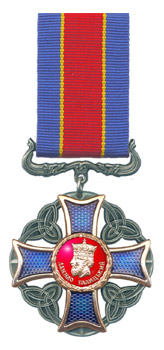
Order of Danylo Halytsky

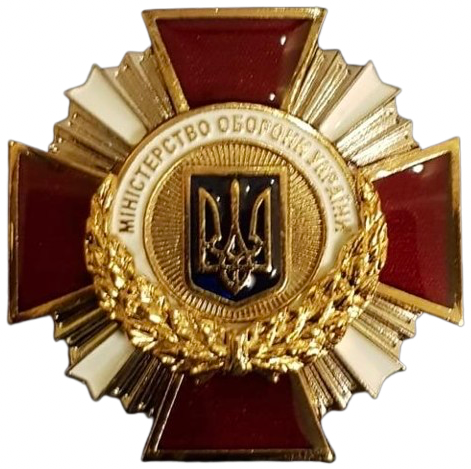
The Badge of Honour

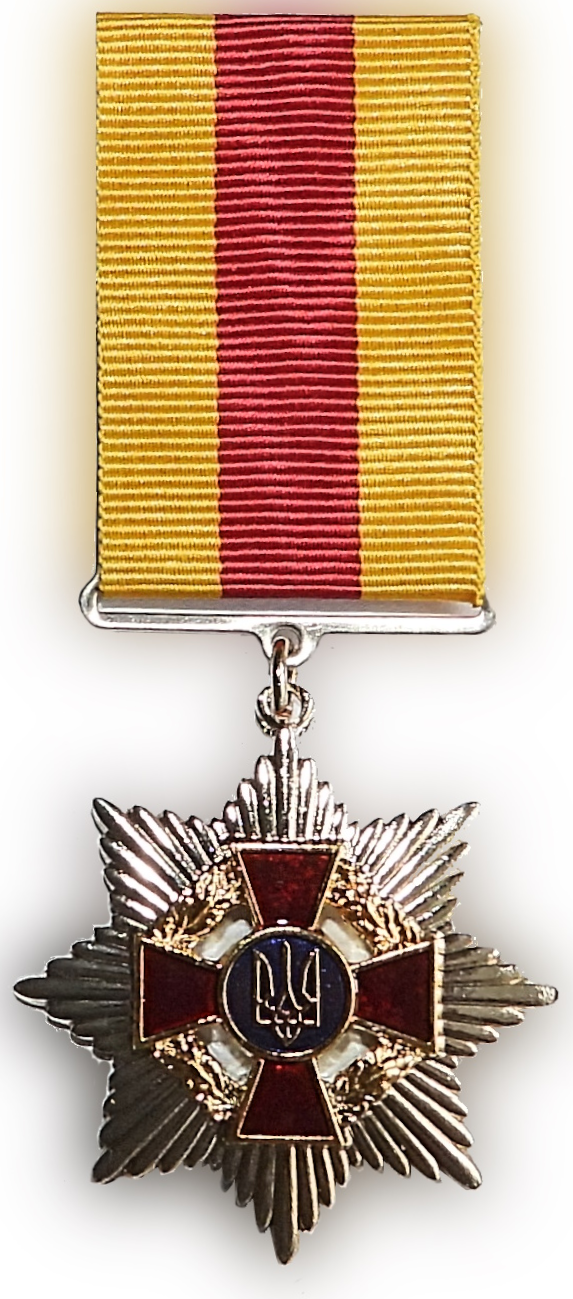
Medal For Supporting the Armed Forces of Ukraine

Flag of Poltava Oblast

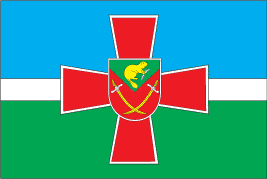
Flag of the former Bobrovytsia Raion with a Cossack cross under its coat-of-arms

Flag of Azov (Russia) with a Cossack cross

Flag of Cetinje

Coat of arms of Rivne Oblast

Coat of arms of Konotop

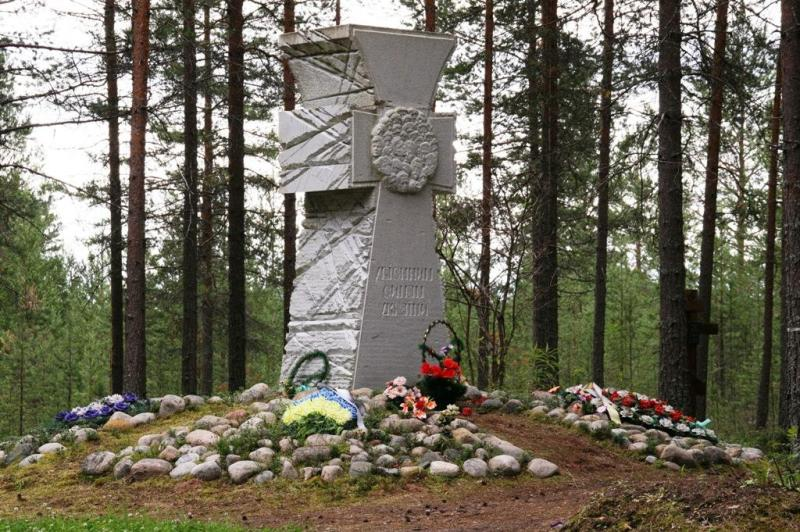
Memorial at Sandarmokh

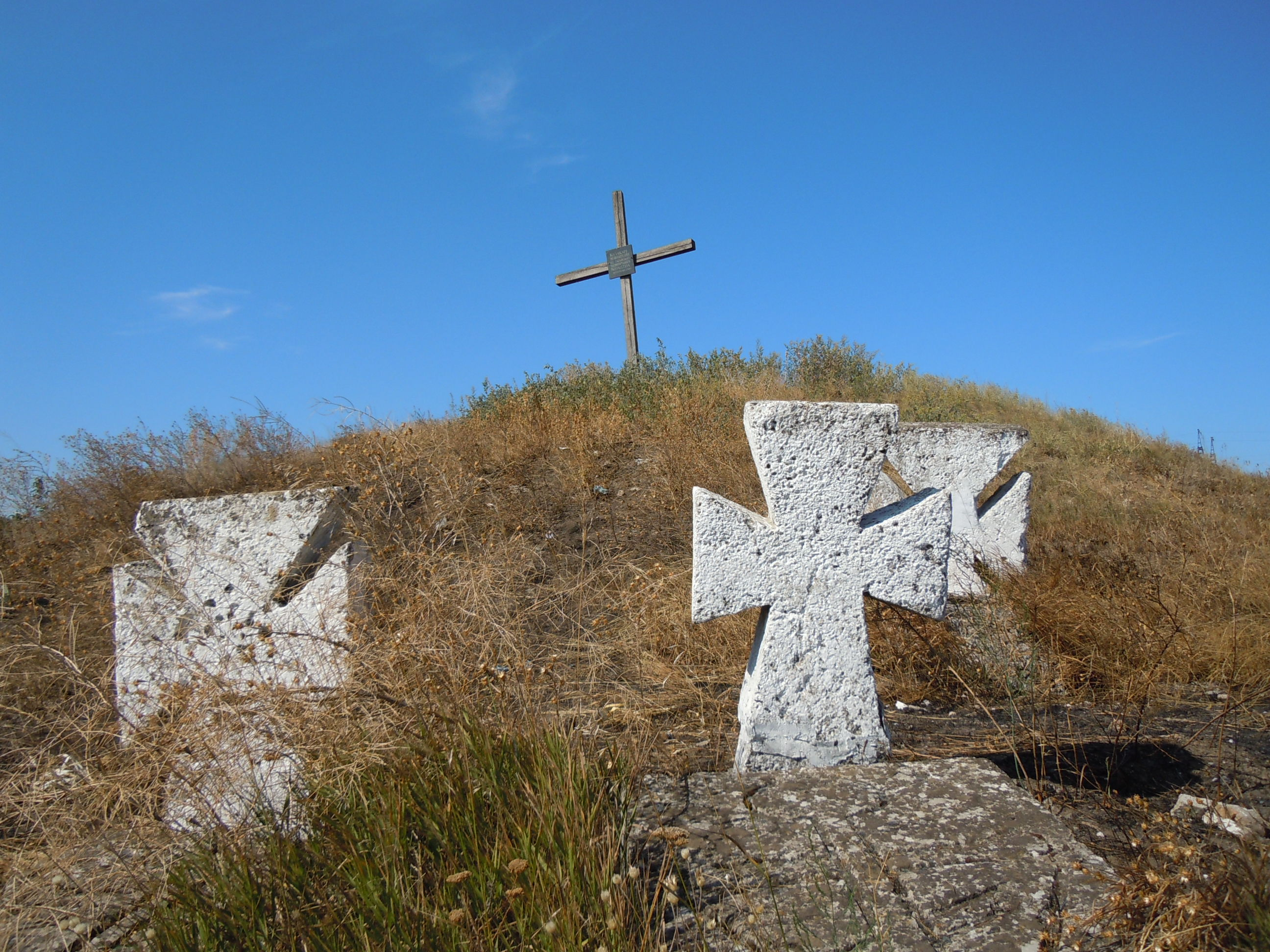
Cossack crosses seen at the Usatove cemetery

Plain Cossack cross

Ukrainian vehicle marking during the Russo-Ukrainian War

Ukrainian vehicle marking during the Russo-Ukrainian War

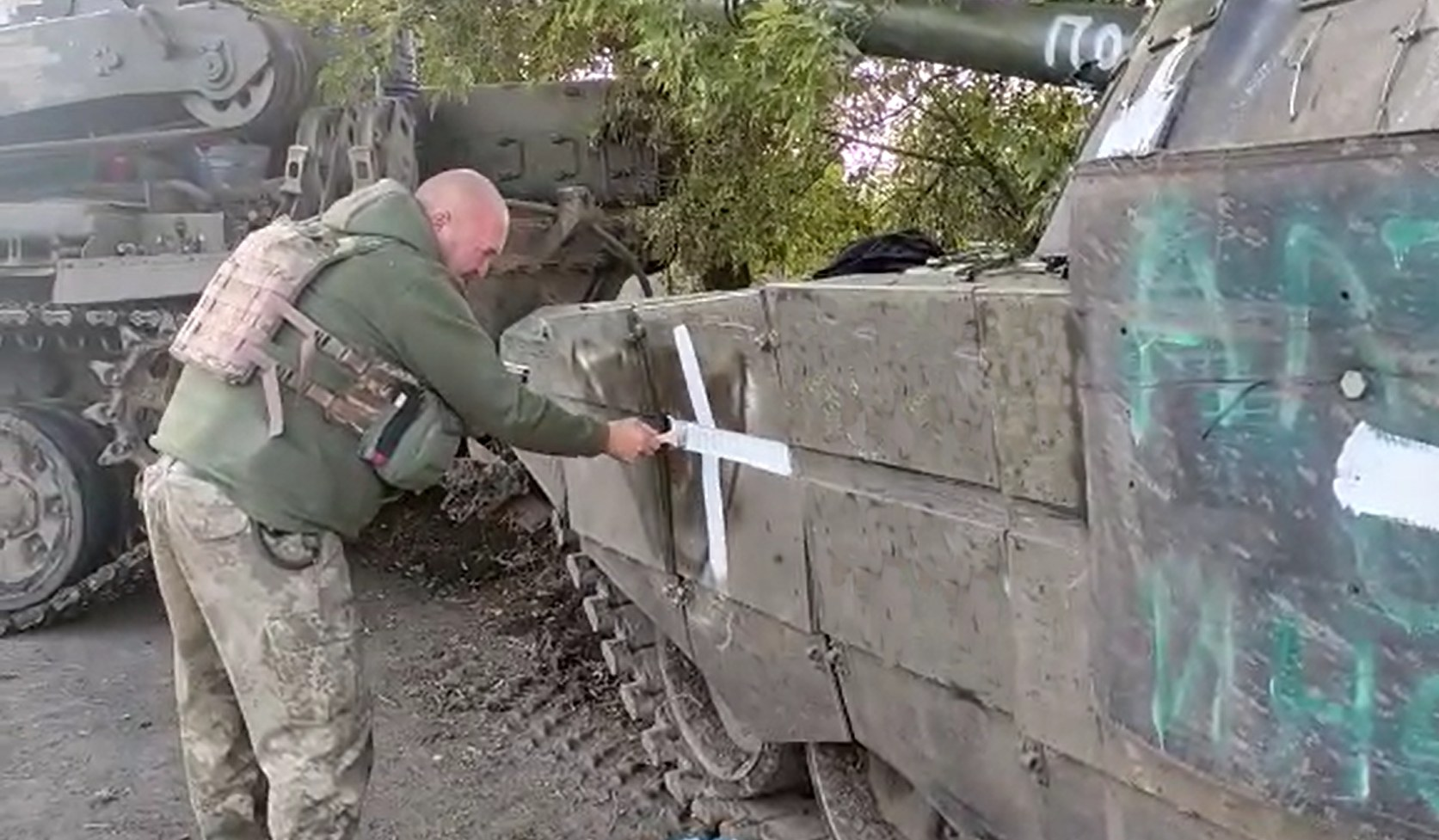
Soldier of the 17th Tank Brigade painting a cross on a captured tank

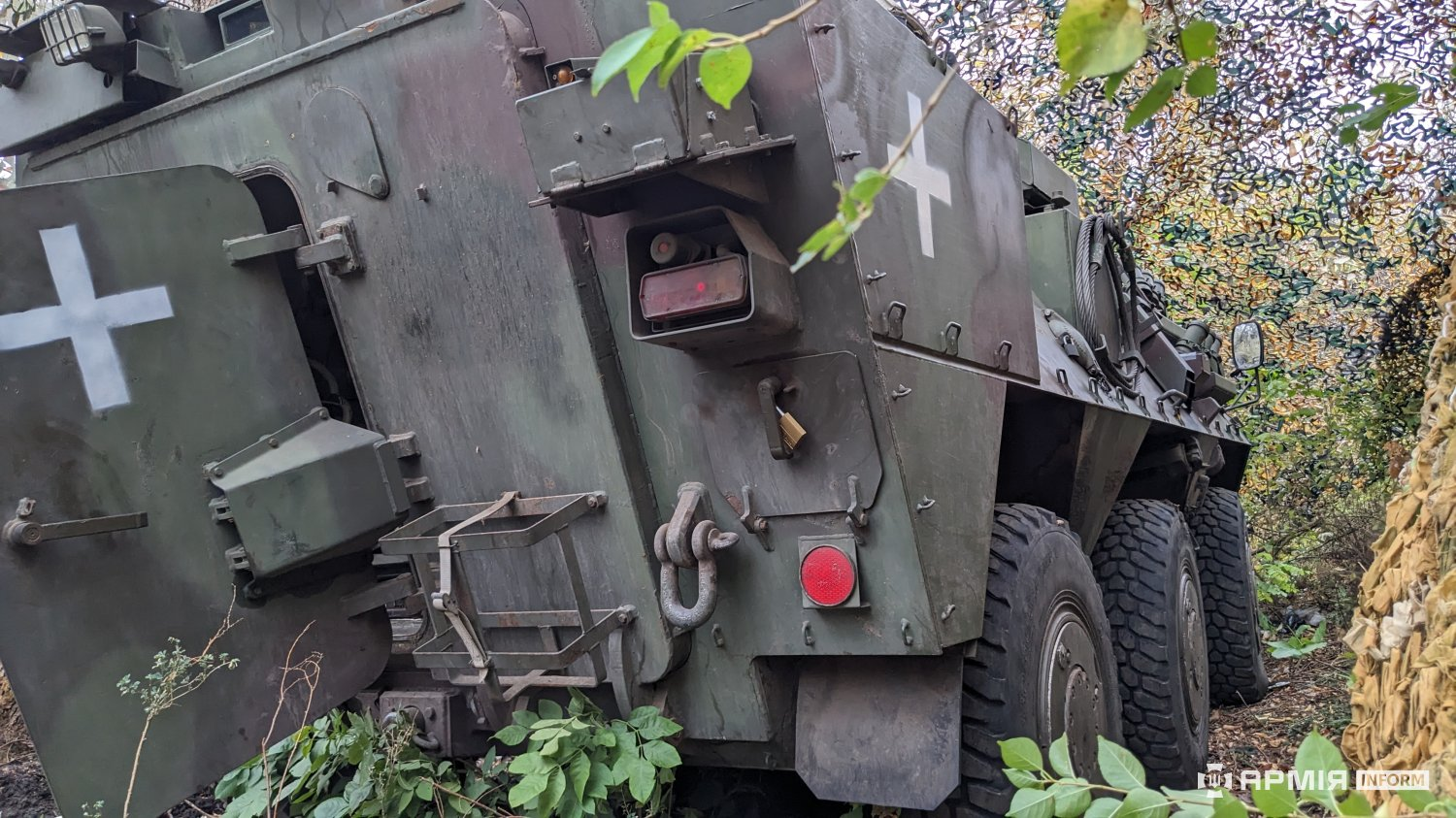
Cossack Crosses painted on a Valuk APC

== See also ==
- Cross pattée
- Balkenkreuz
- Iron Cross
- Maltese cross
