= VPDP =

VPDP may refer to:

- All-Ukrainian Party of Spirituality and Patriotism (VPDP)
- Vanuatu Progressive Development Party (VPDP)
