= Cossack Research Center =

Ukrainian research center

Coordinates: 49°59′18″N 36°13′20″E

Hetman Mazepa Cossack Research Center
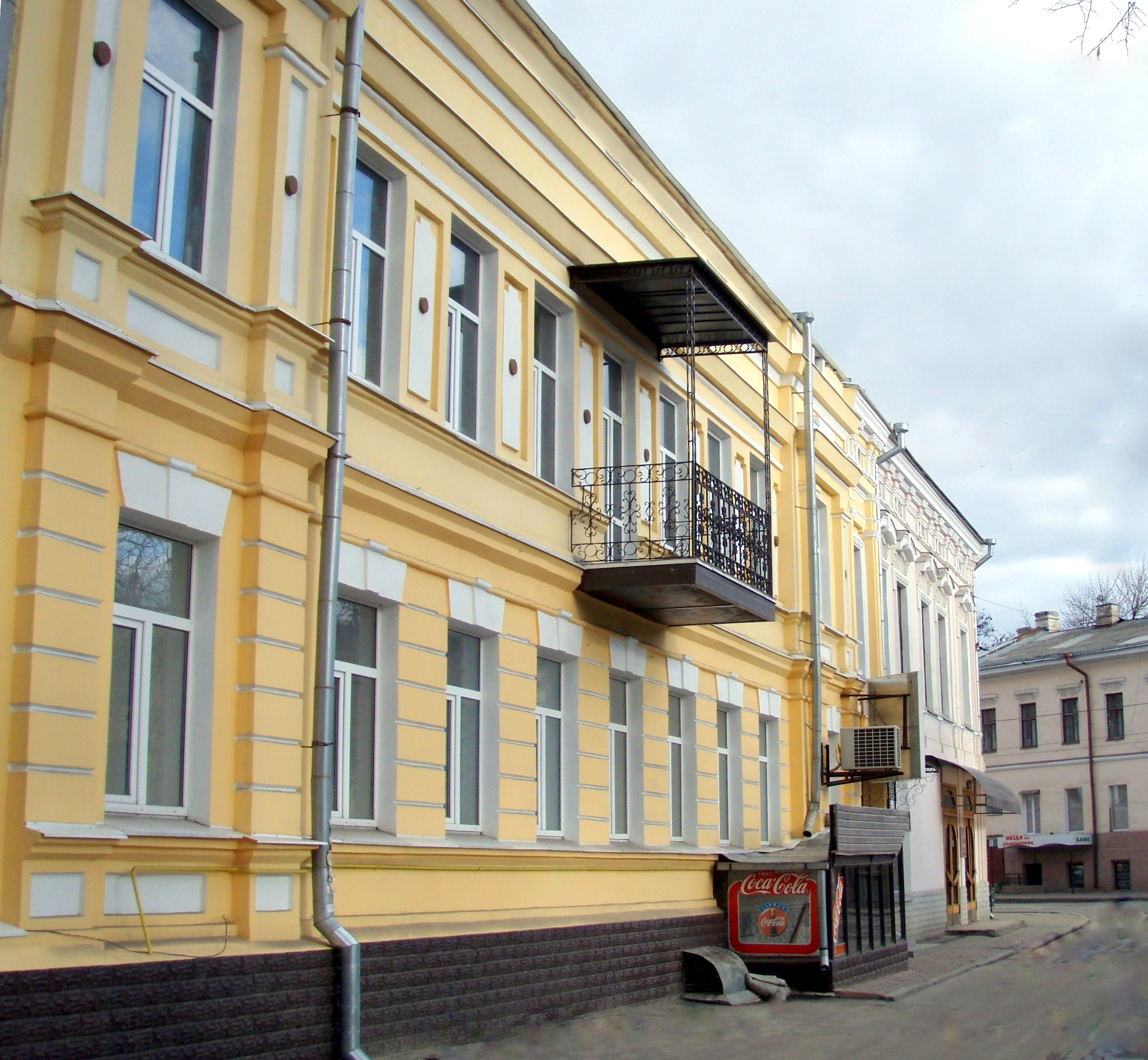
- Formation: 2003
- Type: Non-governmental organization
- Purpose: Historical research
- Members: Ukrainian Registered Cossacks, The Ukrainian Register Cossacks
- Website: mazepa.in.ua
- Remarks: Named for Hetman Ivan Mazepa

The Hetman Mazepa Cossack Research Center (Ukrainian: Науково-дослідний Центр козацтва імені гетьмана Мазепи, romanized: Naukovo-doslidnyi Tsentr kozatstva imeni hetmana Mazepy; Russian: Научно-исследовательский Центр казачества имени гетмана Мазепы) is a public scientific organization, created in Kharkiv in 2003, for research into the historical, patriotic, military, spiritual and cultural traditions of the Ukrainian Cossacks, and on modern Cossack activities in Ukraine. The Center is named for the early 18th-century Ukrainian hetman, Ivan Mazepa. For its scientific achievements, the Center's staff has received awards from the President of Ukraine, the Ukrainian Cabinet, the Kharkiv regional state administration and regional parliament, and other public recognition.

== Activities ==
- Researching the history of the Ukrainian Cossacks and their role in shaping national identity and culture, especially in the struggle for Ukrainian statehood
- Biographical research on the captains and the General Staff of the Ukrainian Cossacks, and publication of this research in various media
- Researching local history as it pertains to the Ukrainian Cossacks
- Publishing articles, in academic journals and other media, on the Ukrainian Cossacks' impact on history, culture and tradition; organizing public exhibits
- Organizing scientific conferences, seminars and symposiums on the Ukrainian Cossacks' history and culture
- Producing documentary films on Ukrainian Cossack history, to keep Ukrainian Cossack culture alive

== Structure ==
The Center is divided among a number of academic disciplines: Cossack history, education, art and beliefs.

== Hetman Mazepa Literary Prize ==
The Hetman Mazepa Literary Prize was established by the center in 2003. It consists of a monetary award (whose amount is secret), a silver medallion and a certificate. The award is made annually on March 20 (the anniversary of Ivan Mazepa's birth), by a committee of businessmen, scientists and writers, for the year's best publication in the field of Cossack history.

== Hetman Mazepa Award ==
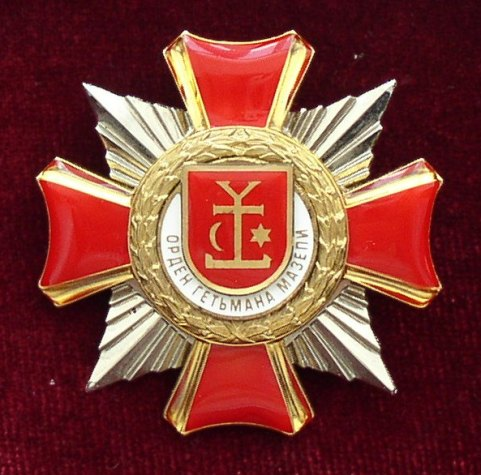
The Hetman Mazepa medallion

The Hetman Mazepa Award was first made on March 20, 2003 in recognition of civilian involvement in the economic and political independence of Ukraine and the preservation of Ukrainian history, patriotism and cultural traditions. The medallion is made from a silver composite and has the basic shape of a Maltese cross. It is set on a square nickel-plated platform with concave sides; the corners of these are shaped like rays, spreading in different directions. The sides of the cross are red enamel. Surrounding the center of the cross, a gilded circle is set with a decorative pattern. A white enamel insert inside the circle bears the inscription "Order of Hetman Mazepa". On top of this insert, a rounded shield is attached with the coat-of-arms of Hetman Mazepa—gold on a red enamel background.
