= Balkenkreuz =

Bar cross that was the symbol of German armed forces from 1935–1945

Various WWII styles of the Balkenkreuz; also see Luftwaffe for official specification versions

The Balkenkreuz (lit. 'beam cross' or 'bar cross') is a straight-armed cross that was first introduced in 1916–1918 and later became the emblem of the Wehrmacht (German Armed Forces) and its branches from 1935 until the end of World War II. It was used by the Wehrmacht Heer (Army), Luftwaffe (Air Force), and Kriegsmarine (Navy).

== History ==
Balkenkreuz symbol is based on the cross of the Teutonic Order. Germany's Luftstreitkräfte (the army air service of the German Imperial Army) first officially adopted the Balkenkreuz in mid-April 1918 (about a week before the death of Manfred von Richthofen), and used it from that time until World War I ended in November 1918. The IdFlieg directive of 20 March 1918 to all manufacturers states in the first sentence (translated to English): "To improve the recognition of our aircraft, the following is ordered: [...]". In paragraph 2, the second sentence specifies: "This alteration is to be carried out by 15 April 1918." The closing sentence reads: "Order 41390 is to be speedily executed."

Its use resumed, with new standardized dimensions, from the beginning of the Nazi Germany's air force (the Luftwaffe) in 1935, as part of the new Wehrmacht unified German military forces founded in mid-March 1935. German armored fighting vehicles (AFVs) during the invasion of Poland (September–October 1939) used a plain white cross, but before the onset of Operation Weserübung (April 1940), the black core cross with white "flanks" that the Luftwaffe used had become the basic German AFV national insignia, as used for the rest of the war (to 1945).

The Luftwaffe used two specifications for the Balkenkreuz:

- one with narrower white "flanks" on upper wing surfaces – before July 1939, it was used in all six regular positions on an airframe
- one with wider white "flanks" surrounding the same width (25% wide as long from end to end for both versions) central black cross beneath the wings and on the fuselage sides of German military aircraft during the war years

Late in World War II it became increasingly common for the Balkenkreuz national insignia to be painted on without the black-color "core cross", using only the quartet of right-angled "flanks" for its form to reduce its visibility – this could be done in either white or black, and with both the narrow and wide-flank forms of the cross.

== Later use ==
The Balkenkreuz has not been used by the post-WWII militaries of East Germany, West Germany, or unified Germany. However, the Iron Cross used by today's German Bundeswehr unified defense forces inherits the four white, or lighter-colored, "flanks" of the Balkenkreuz that do not "cap" the ends of the cross in either case, but with the "flanks" following the flared arms of the earlier German Empire's cross pattée (Eisernes Kreuz/iron cross) instead, from the 1916-1918 era.

Examples

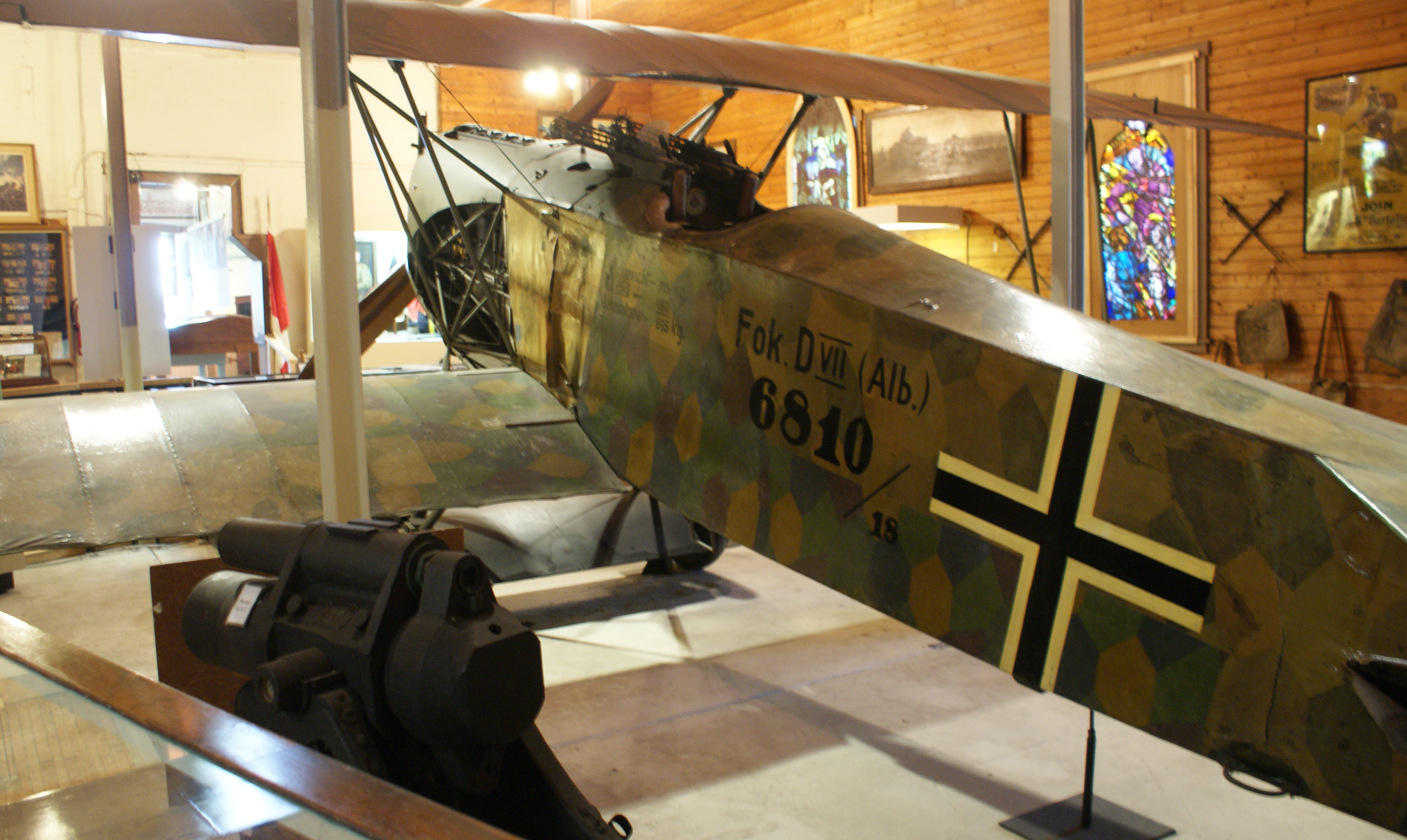
The "Knowlton" Fokker D.VII with late-1918 Balkenkreuz of the German Empire's Luftstreitkräfte on fuselage.

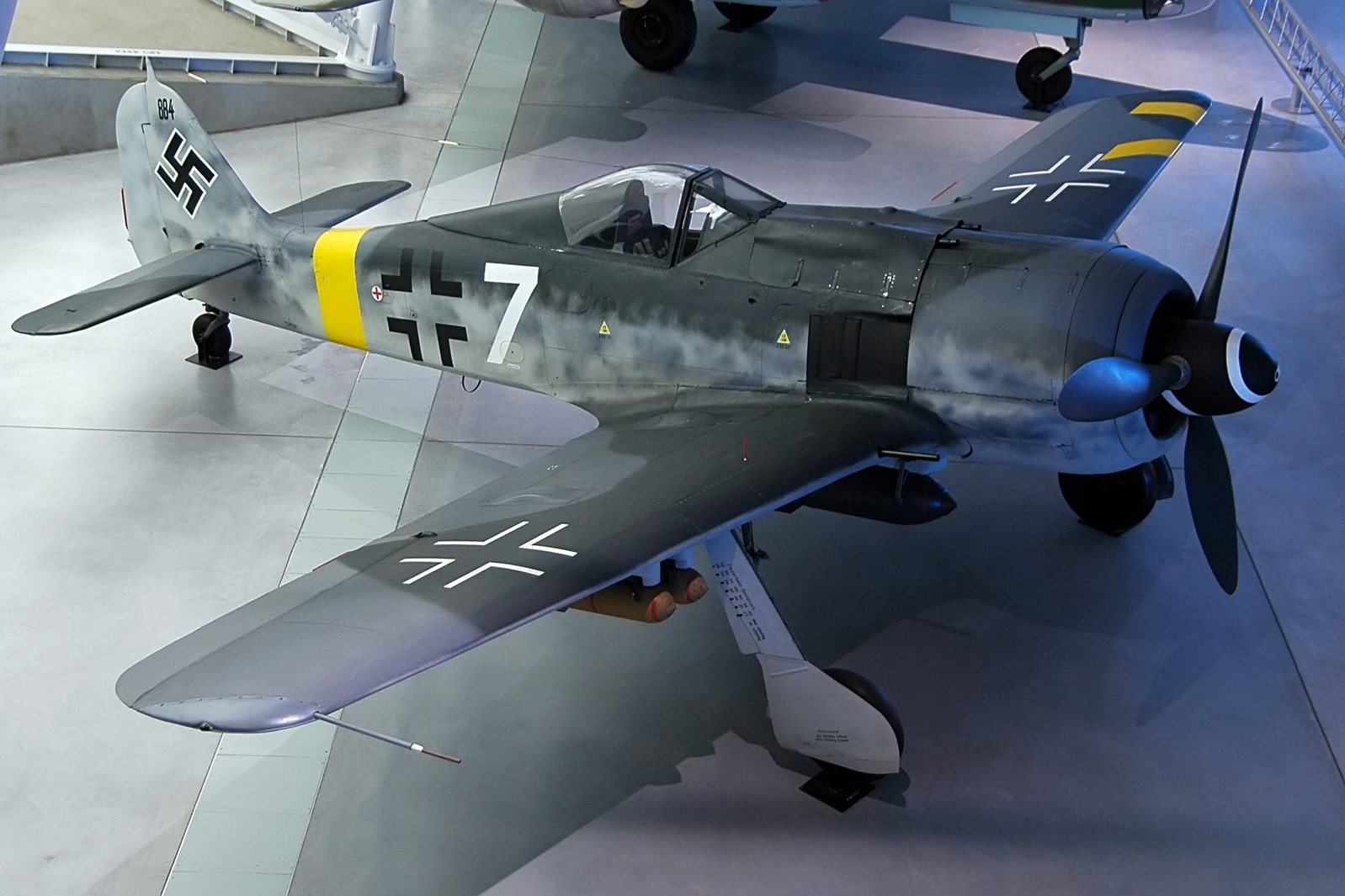
The Smithsonian's restored Fw 190F, showing both forms of Balkenkreuz in "low-visibility" (flanks-only) form

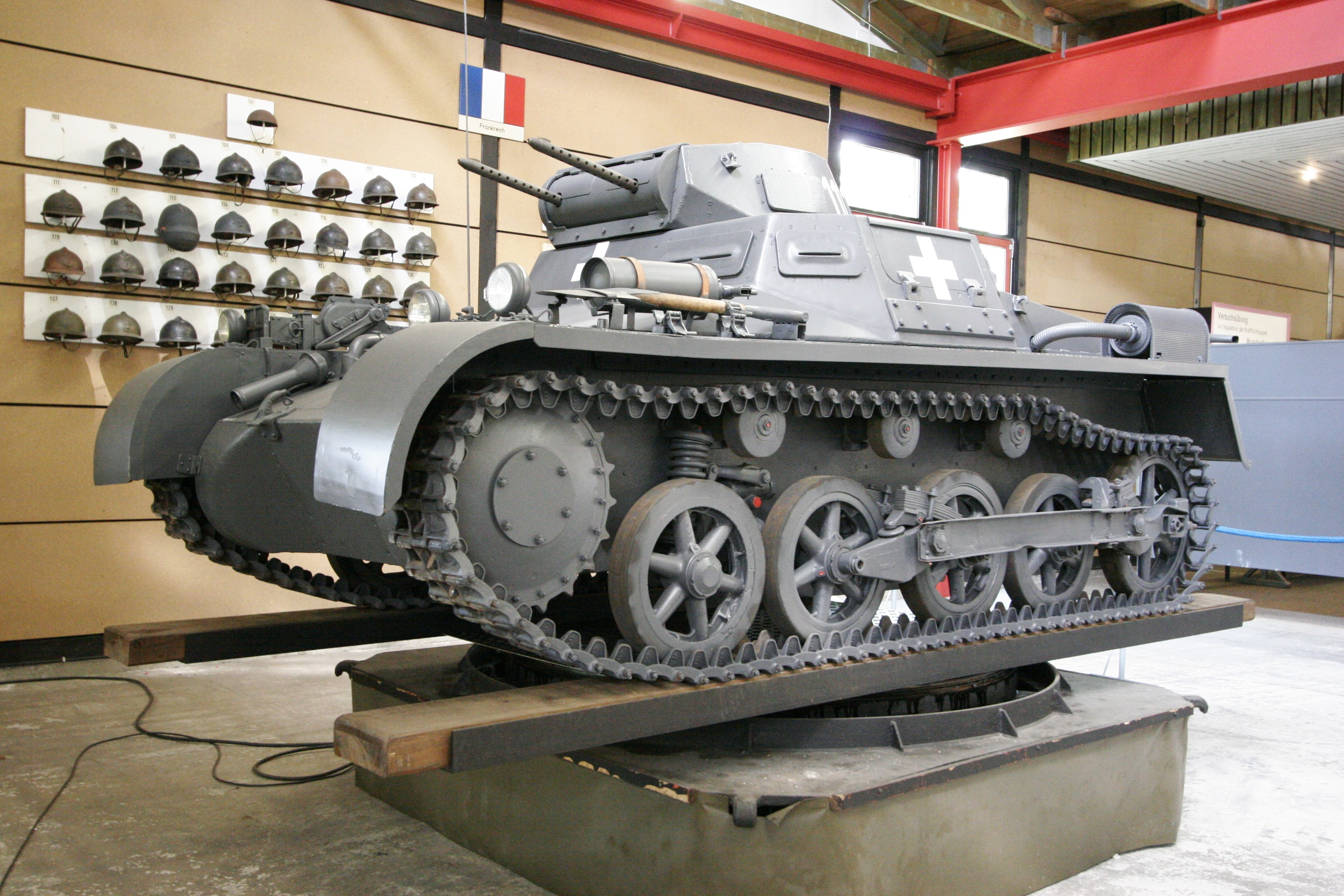
Panzer I tank in a museum, with Polish-campaign "white cross" German insignia

== See also ==
- Cossack cross
- Cross pattée
- Maltese cross
