= Flag of Riga =

City of Riga
- Proportion: 1∶2
- Adopted: 1673, readopted in 1937 and 1990, color regulated on July 3, 2012
- Design: A horizontal bicolour of blue and white, with the coat of arms of Riga in the middle.
- Use: Standard of the City Council Chairman
- Adopted: 1995, color regulated on July 3, 2012
- Use: Flagship pennant
- Adopted: 1995, color regulated on July 3, 2012

The flag of Riga is one of the official symbols of Riga, along with the coat of arms of Riga. The flag consists of a horizontal bicolour of blue and white, with the coat of arms of Riga in the middle.

== Design ==
The regulation on the flag of Riga, standard of the City Council chairman (Mayor) of Riga, and the flagship pennant of Riga, on the Riga City Council Binding Regulations No.181, states that:

=== Flag of Riga ===
1. The flag of Riga is divided into equal parts, with blue at the top and white at the bottom.
2. The color ratio of the flag is 1:1.
3. The ratio of the width and length of the flag is 1:2.
4. The greater coat of arms of Riga on the flag is placed in the middle of the flag and depicted on the obverse and reverse sides of the flag, which is 2/5 of the width of the flag
5. For example, if the flag's dimensions are 1 × 2 m and 1.5 × 3 m; the heights of the coats of arms are 40 cm and 60 cm respectively.

=== Standard of the City Council chairman of Riga ===
1. The standard of the chairman of the Riga City Council is based on white fabric with 2 cm wide blue borders.
2. On both sides of the white square is the greater coat of arms of Riga.
3. The coat of arms on the standard is 2/5 of the total standard's height.
4. The standard dimensions are 30 cm long and 15 cm wide.

=== Flagship pennant of Riga ===
1. The flagship of Riga city flag is a trapezoidal fabric ribbon corresponding to the colors and color proportions of the Riga city flag.

== Colours ==
The colours of the flag and the coat of arms are regulated in the Riga City Council Binding Regulations No.181.

=== Field ===
- Blue: Pantone 285 C
- White: Pantone White C

=== Coat of arms ===
- Silver: Pantone 877 C
- Gold: Pantone 873 C
- Red: Pantone 186 C
- Gray: Pantone Cool Gray 6 C
- Black: Pantone Black

== Regulation on the flagpole ==
Two crossed black keys on the flagpole of the flag of Riga.

The flag base's color is white. The upper end of the flagpole is flat, rounded, several centimeters larger than the diameter of the stem. The upper end of the chest may also be a decorative tapered, spherical, elliptical tip or cap, in which two crossed keys are represented.

== Usage ==
The flag should be used free of charge by the person on the buildings in the administrative territory of Riga without the permission of the Symbolic Commission. The flag is permanently placed at the Riga City Council, the Riga City Municipality Administration and other buildings of the Riga City Municipality.

The flag is prohibited for use:

1. at buildings in an emergency condition;
2. at buildings for which the facade is being repaired;
3. in a damaged or faded condition.

The flag can be used for representational and decorative purposes, maintaining proportions of certain length, width and color. The flag is used on a flag-scale basis, meaning that the display of the flag should maintain the color and length-width ratio. It is forbidden to use the flag pennant of Riga on the facade of a building. Individuals and organizations who use the flag for commercial purposes must obtain from the Symbolic Commission a permission, as for the usage of other symbols of Riga.

== History ==
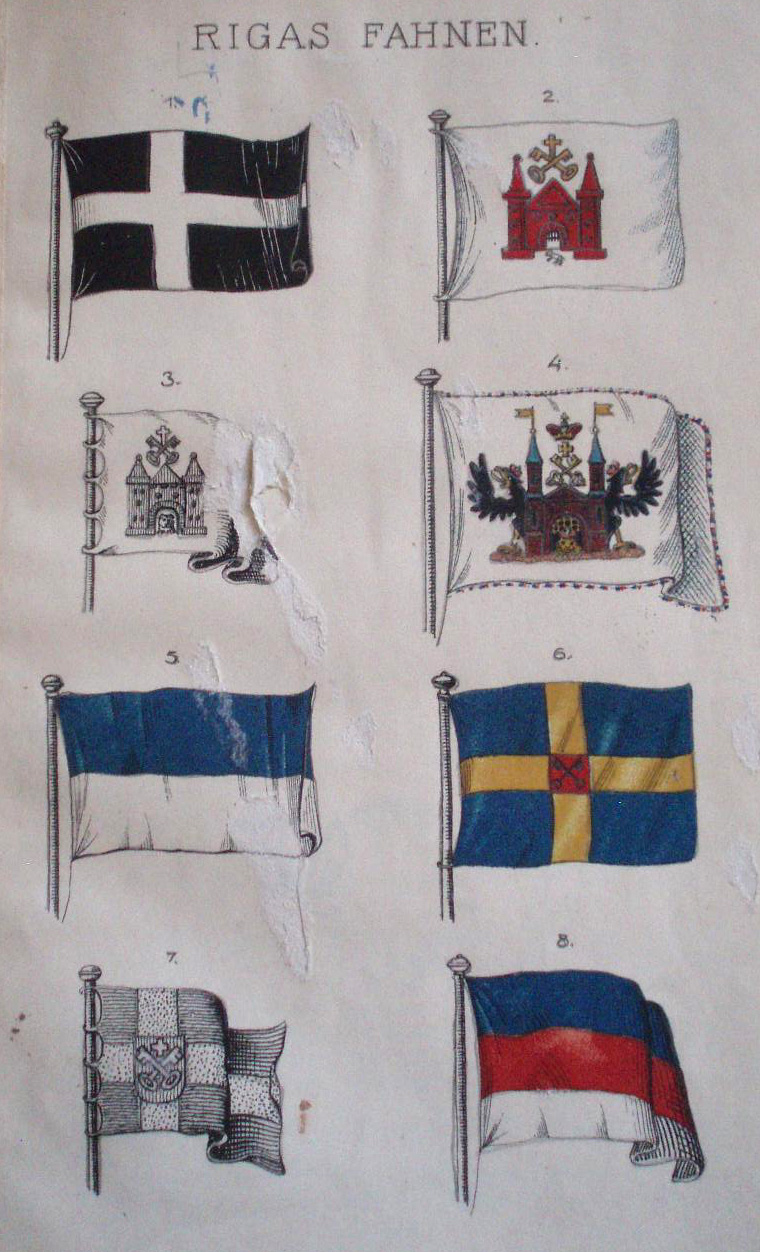

For the first time, the flag of Riga was mentioned in 1232 (in the book Vexillum civitatis Rigensis), but its color and form are not known. After Riga joining the Hanseatic League in 1282 sources mention that the flag of Riga ships has a white cross, but the shape and color of the flag are not indicated (in the beginning of the 14th century it was known that Riga had a black flag with a white cross). After 1582, the flag of Riga was white with a red coat of arms of the city, while in the middle 17th century, thanks to the city's heroism defending against Muscovite troops, the king of Sweden assigned his royal colors to Riga: a blue flag with a yellow cross, with in the center of the cross two keys were crossed on the red shield. The flag was used until 1860.

The blue-white flag of Riga, which was used today, was created in 1673, when it was approved in the statutes of Riga - blue and white bands in rectangular shape, with the coat of arms of Riga in the center. The flag was used along with the flag given by the Swedish king.

From the mid-1800s until 1917, a new tricolor flag with equal blue, red and white bands was approved for Riga. Some sources place its origin to the 1830s.

During the 1920s the blue-white flag of Riga was restored by 1935, and, with the addition of the coat of arms in the center, officially approved on 4 May 1937. It was flown until the Soviet occupation of Latvia in 1940.

During the era of Soviet Latvia, after having no official city flag, the city authorities hurriedly adopted a red flag in 1970 after the city was awarded the Order of Lenin, with a different obverse and reverse side of the flag. The obverse side of the flag consisted of Lenin's portrait with a laurel branch and the inscription "Workers of the world, unite!" in Latvian. The reverse side of the flag consisted of the coat of arms of the Latvian SSR, and the inscription "Riga City" in both Latvian and Russian.

=== Current flag ===
In 1988, during the Singing Revolution, academician Jānis Stradiņš led a campaign to return to the blue and white design. While the change was accepted on 5 August 1988, the then-communist-dominated city council with its chairman Alfrēds Rubiks in charge amended the coat of arms of the original flag, replacing the crown and cross in the shield with a five-pointed red star and the color of the crossed keys from black to gold. The shade of blue was also made lighter. The original blue-white flag of 1937 was ultimately restored by the city council as the current flag in 20 April 1990.

== Gallery ==
Flag of Riga after it joins the Hanseatic League (1282)

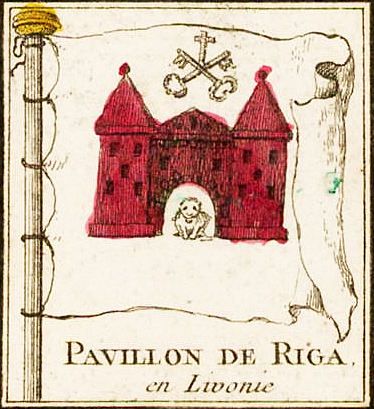
Flag of Riga from Jacques-Nicolas Bellin flag cart, presented among the important nautical flags of the 18th century.

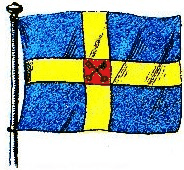
Flag of Riga granted by the Swedish King

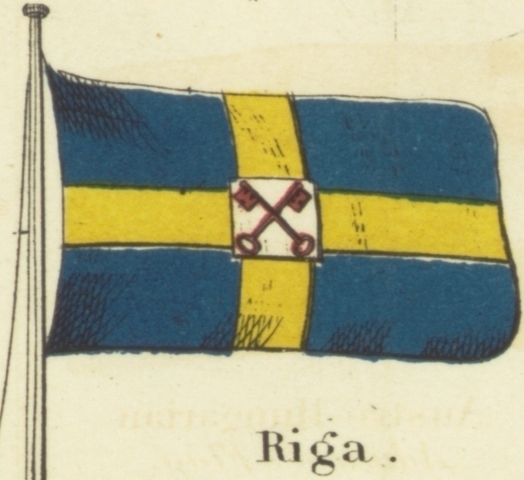
Variant flag of Riga under Swedish rule, according to the Johnson's new chart of national emblems, 1868.

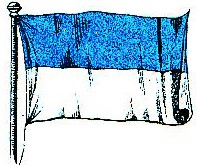
Early design of the current flag of Riga in the 17th century, with no coat of arms

Flag of Riga from the mid-19th century until the 1920s

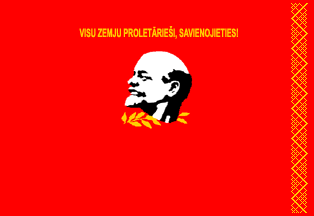
Obverse side of the flag of Riga from 1970-1990

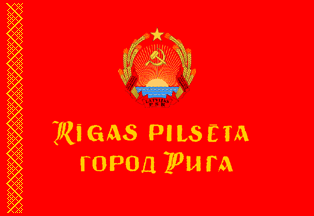
Reverse side of the flag of Riga from 1970-1990

Present flag of Riga in vertical form
