= Coat of arms of Riga =

Versions
- Middle coat of arms of Riga

- Lesser coat of arms of Riga

- The two crossed black keys in the coat of arms of Riga, commonly used as a symbol for the city.
- Adopted: not later than 1225, current version in 1925, readopted in 1989
- Earlier version: before 1925, various versions existed

The coat of arms of Riga is one of the official symbols of Riga, along with the flag of Riga.

== Blazon ==
The blazon on the greater, middle, and lesser coat of arms of Riga, on the Riga City Council Binding Regulations No.181, states that:

=== Greater coat of arms of Riga ===
On the silver field there is a stand-alone red brick wall with two towers and a roof between them. Below the roof, there is a gate with a raised grid facing the golden lion's head. Above the roof there are two crossed black keys, a golden cross, and a golden crown, respectively above each others. The supporters are two golden lions with red tongues and turned heads that stands on a grey plinth.

=== Middle coat of arms of Riga ===
On the silver field there is a stand-alone red brick wall with two towers and a roof between them. Below the roof, there is a gate with a raised grid facing the golden lion's head. Above the roof there are two crossed black keys, a golden cross, and a golden crown, respectively above each others.

=== Lesser coat of arms of Riga ===
On the silver field there are two crossed black keys, and a golden cross above them.

== Symbolism ==
- The two towers symbolize the city's autonomy.
- The raised gate with lion's head symbolizes the bravery of its citizens.
- Two crossed black keys symbolizes the patronage of the Pope and the protection of the keys of St. Peter.
- A golden cross and a golden crown symbolizes the subservience to the bishop.
- Two golden lions on a grey plinth symbolizes the strong foundation of the city and the bravery of its citizens.

== Colors ==
=== For display ===
The colors of the coat of arms for display are regulated in the Riga City Council Binding Regulations No.181.

- Silver: Pantone 877 C
- Gold: Pantone 873 C
- Red: Pantone 186 C
- Gray: Pantone Cool Gray 6 C
- Black: Pantone Black

=== For branding ===
The colors of the coat of arms for branding is regulated in a document that has been confirmed by the chairman of the Riga City Council, numbered 128-r. In this version, the field and the plinth had the same gray color.

- Silver: N/A
- Gold: Pantone 873 C
- Red: Pantone 186 C
- Gray: Pantone Cool Gray 4 C
- Black: Pantone Black

== Usage ==
The greater, middle, and lesser coat of arms of Riga should conform to their heraldic descriptions and samples. Coats of arms of Riga with shield holders, coats of arms of Riga, Riga's small coats of arms can be used in heraldic colors, black and white, or in monochrome colours.

The coat of arms usage in the forms and business cards can only be used by the Riga city municipal institutions, institutions, structural units and municipal corporations.

The coats of arms of Riga can be used without the permission of the Symbolic Commission in posters, publications, advertisements and events which was financially supported or/and organized by the Riga City Municipality, or organizers that had signed a cooperation agreement with the Riga Municipality.

Individuals and legal entities can use the coat of arms of Riga, with the heraldic elements, upon obtaining the permission from the Symbolic Commission, for:

- souvenir making
- presentation of articles
- product packaging design
- presentation of events
- in advertisements

== History ==
It is known that from 1225 to 1226, from 1330 to 1340, a city wall with open gates and two towers, the middle of which is located on the cross pole, can be seen in the city stamp, but on each side along the key. The walls of the medieval towns' marble with the gates were a common heraldic element that symbolized the city's independence, significance and power.

In 1297-1330 when the Livonian Order became the Riga City Council, a new seal was created. The walls with the raised gates and the crossed keys remain from the old version, but with a different location. New heraldic elements, such as cross of the Livonian Order was inserted into the coat of arms to symbolize symbolising the dominance of the Livonian Order in Riga, and replaced the crossed staves. Other new element, a lion in the raised stone gates of the city, was added, which symbolises to the prowess of the townspeople and the growing independence of the citizens of Riga. This coat of arms was created in 1347 and has been preserved in a 1349 document stamp and is considered to be the basis for development of the Riga coat of arms.

In 1554, the coat of arms of the city of Riga was supplemented with a new heraldic element, lions, as the shield holders of the coat of arms.

In 1656, the city acquired the right to place the Swedish crown in its coat of arms as a form of gratitude for the heroic defense of the city during the siege of Russia. The color of the white coat of arms was changed to blue, but the order of the cross red color - with gold. Such coat of arms was kept in the Riga stamp seal until 1889.

After the Northern War, when Riga was taken over by the Russian Empire, the Russian Tsarina Catherine II approved the coat of arms of Riga on 4 October 1788. The shield holders of the lions were replaced by the symbol of the Russian Empire - the two-headed eagle's, and the crown of the monarch of Sweden with the Russian imperial crown.

On October 31, 1925, with the approval of the President of Latvia, Riga received a new coat of arms, the description of which is as follows:

Red brick walls on a silver background with two towers and raised gates in which a gold lion’s head is displayed, and on the upper part of the shield between the towers and beneath a gold crown stand crossed gold paws and two crossed black keys. The shield holders are two golden lions with red tongues and turned heads on two grey cornices supported by a stylised leaf.

In the years of the Latvian SSR, there was little attention to the coat of arms of Riga, and the new coat of arms was approved on 15 February 1967, designed by Ivars Strautmanis. It had a coat of arms with a golden border in the color of the flag of the Latvian SSR, with a 2-tower-shaped silhouette of the city gate (the silhouette was added more details in 1987). Above the gate is 2 crossed keys and a yellow star. The establishment year of Riga, "1201", was added later in 1968, and was deleted in a 1987 revision, and was changed with the lions below the gate in 1988.

=== Current coat of arms ===
After Latvia regained independence, Riga regained its historical coat of arms, and the approval in 1925 was renewed in 1988.

== Gallery ==
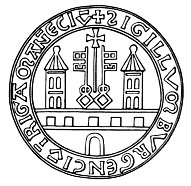
Seal of Riga in 1225

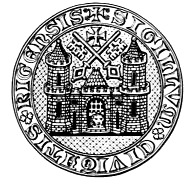
Seal of Riga in 1347

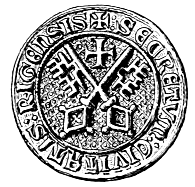
Seal of Riga in 1368

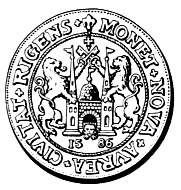
Seal of Riga in 1586

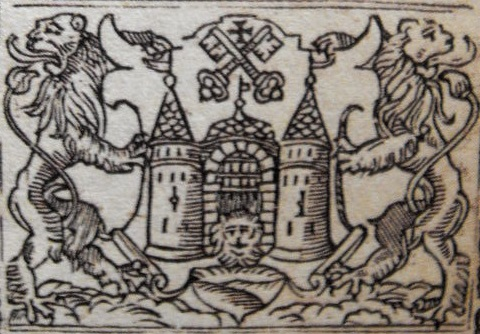
Coat of arms of Riga in 1591

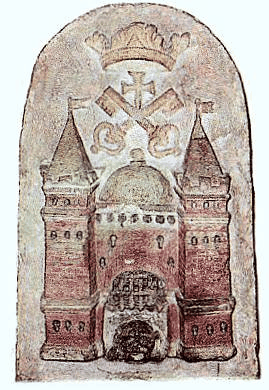
Coat of arms of Riga from 1660 until 1721

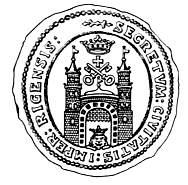
Seal of Riga in 1707

=== Governorate of Livonia ===
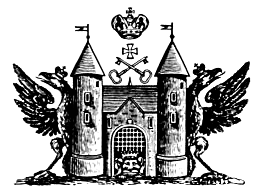
Coat of arms of Riga in 1723

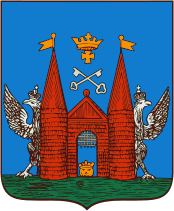
Coat of arms of Riga in 1788

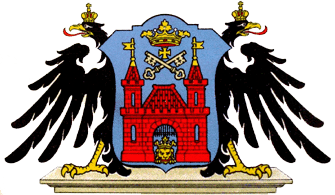
Coat of arms of Riga in 1904

=== Republic of Latvia (1918-1940) ===
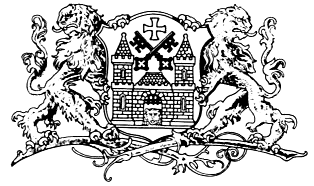
Coat of arms of Riga, created by Kārlis Brencēns and approved in 1923

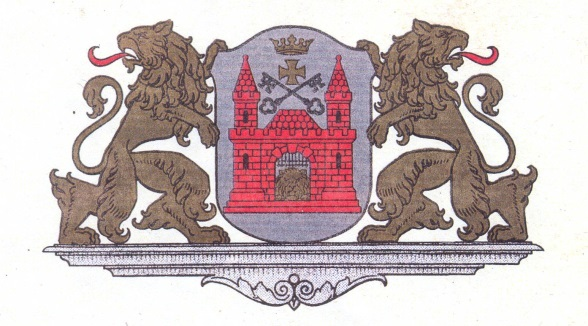
Coat of arms of Riga, created by Rihards Zariņš and approved on 31 October 1925

=== Latvian SSR ===
From 1988 until 1990, there was no official version of the coat of arms. There was a restoration of the coat of arms, but the restored version is unknown. The first version is based on the 1967 coat of arms, created by artist I. Strautmanis. The other version is based on the 1925 coat of arms, created by artist Y. Ivanov.

Coat of arms of Riga from 15 February 1967 until 1988

Coat of arms of Riga from 1987 to 1988
Lesser coat of arms of Riga from 1988 until 1990, first version

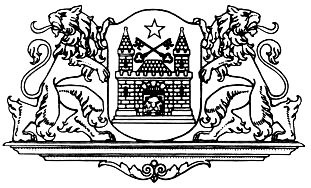
Greater coat of arms of Riga from 1988 until 1990, first version

Lesser coat of arms of Riga from 1988 until 1990, second version

Greater coat of arms of Riga from 1988 until 1990, second version

=== Republic of Latvia (since 1990) ===
Lesser coat of arms of Riga in 1988, after the restoration of the old coat of arms

Greater coat of arms of Riga in 1988, after the restoration of the old coat of arms
