= Anatolii Shevchenko =

Hetman of the Ukrainian Registered Cossacks

Hetman Anatolii Shevchenko
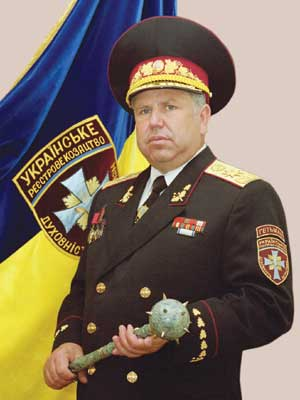
- Born: 17 May 1948 (age 78); Bryansk Oblast, Russian SFSR, Soviet Union
- Education: Donetsk National University

Anatolii Ivanovych Shevchenko (Ukrainian: Анатолій Іванович Шевченко; born 17 May 1948) is the Hetman of the All-Ukrainian Public Organization The Ukrainian Registered Cossacks, member of the Ukrainian Cossacks Council under the President of Ukraine, Honored Worker of Science and Technology of Ukraine, Corresponding Member of the National Academy of Sciences of Ukraine, Doctor of Technical Sciences, Doctor of Divinity, Professor, Rector of the State University of Informatics and Artificial Intelligence, Chairman of the Scientific Council of the Scientific Research Center of the Cossacks named after Hetman Mazepa, head of the editorial board of the all-Ukrainian newspaper "Cossack Ukraine."

== Biography ==
Anatolli Shevchenko was born on 17 May 1948 in the village of Kazhany, Starodub District, Bryansk Oblast, formerly the Starodub Regiment of the Hetman Region. He was a staff officer of the KGB and later was a colonel in the Security Service of Ukraine. In 2002, he was elected Hetman of the Ukrainian Register Cossacks. He officially proposed to the government and president of Ukraine the national motto of: "God, People, Ukraine."

As of 11 January 2023, he is the head of INSTALL-NET, in Dunaivtsi, Khmelnytskyi Oblast.

== Creation and management of the Ukrainian Register Cossacks ==
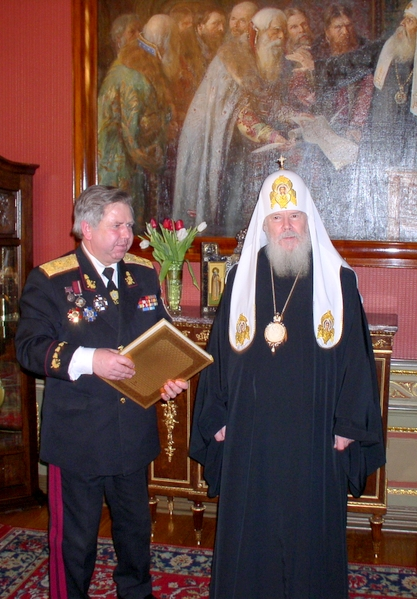
Anatoliy Shevchenko during a meeting with Patriarch Alexy II, Moscow

In 2002, he initiated the revival of the Ukrainian Registered Cossacks and since then has been the Hetman of this all-Ukrainian public organization. He is a member of the Council of the Ukrainian Cossacks under the President of Ukraine.

== Chancellor ==
In 1997, he was elected rector of the Donetsk State Institute of Artificial Intelligence, and since 2007 of the university. Since 2001, he served as the rector of the Kyiv scientific and educational complex "Intelekt".

== Political activity ==
On his initiative, the All-Ukrainian Party of Spirituality and Patriotism (VPDP) was created in 2000. In the same year, he was elected chairman of the party. In 2006, the All-Ukrainian Party of Spirituality and Patriotism, led by him, took part together with the Party for the Protection of Pensioners, as well as the All-Ukrainian Chornobyl People's Party "For the Welfare and Social Protection of the People" in the elections to the Verkhovna Rada, creating the electoral block "Power of the People". From circulation VII from the rally of the VPDP to the Ukrainian people: "Today, we can frankly declare that the All-Ukrainian Party of Spirituality and Patriotism is the only political force in Ukraine, the main tasks of which have become: the unification of the entire Ukrainian people around the idea of peace, harmony, the growth of national welfare and a tolerant attitude towards the choices of each citizen, the embodiment in the life of the national idea, "God, People, Ukraine".

== Honorary titles of Hetman of Ukraine ==
- Honorary citizen of the village of Kulchytsi, Lviv region;
- Honorary citizen of the city of Lubna, Poltava region;
- Honorary citizen of the village of Rudy, Lviv region.
- In 2004, by a resolution of the Presidium of the National Academy of Sciences of Ukraine, Anatoly Shevchenko was awarded the S. O. Lebedev Prize for outstanding achievements in the creation of informatics and computer technology tools.
- For the revival of spirituality, patriotism, positive experience in the improvement of relations between Ukraine and the US in the field of science, education, culture, business, Anatoly Shevchenko was awarded the official Certificate of Honored Guest of the U.S. in the Oklahoma State Congress in 2007.
- In 2007, the Presidium of the National Academy of Sciences of Ukraine awarded Anatoly Shevchenko the title "Inventor of 2007" with a certificate for high performance in invention and patent-licensing work

== The book "Christ" ==
A. I. Shevchenko's monograph "Christ" is recommended by the Department of Religious Studies of the Faculty of Philosophy of Taras Shevchenko Kyiv National University as a study guide in higher educational institutions. Handed over for use in teaching students of the Kharkiv Theological Seminary.

== Awards ==
=== State awards ===
- 1999 – Order "For Merit" III degree;
- 2008 – Order "For Merit" of the 2nd degree;
- Awarded departmental orders and medals of the KGB of the USSR and the Security Council of Ukraine.

=== Church awards ===
- 2005 – Order of Venerable Nestor the Chronicler.
- 2006 – Order of Agapit Pecherskyi.

=== Public awards ===
- 2006 – Laureate of the Literary Prize named after Hetman Mazepa.
- 2007 – Order of the "Ruby Cross" for charity.

== Scientific works ==
- A. I. Shevchenko Military transportation within the framework of cooperation between Ukraine and the European Union // Zalizn. transp. of Ukraine. — 2006. — N 4.
- A. I. Shevchenko From the history of the military communications service. // Railway transp. of Ukraine. — 2004.
- Shevchenko A. I. Microrobots against submarines. // Mathematical machines and systems. — 2002. — No. 2.
- Shevchenko A. I. Christos. — K.: "Science and education". — 2004.
- A. I. Shevchenko Foundations of Christianity. The way to the truth. — IPSHI.: "Science and education". — 2004.
- Shevchenko A. I. Christianity is a historical regularity. — Donetsk: Izd-vo DonDISHI, 1998.
- Shevchenko A. I. Actual problems of the theory of artificial intelligence: Monogr. — K.: Science and education, 2003.
- A. I. Shevchenko. Knowing the truth begins with faith. // Proceedings of the III Scientific-Prof. conf. "Science. religion Society". — Donetsk, 1998.
- Shevchenko A. I. Love, harmony and tolerance is the true path defined in the "Eternal Books". // Proceedings of the 5th Scientific-Prof. conf. "Science. Religion. Society". — Donetsk, 1999.

== Literature ==
- Основні документи, що регламентують роботу Українського Реєстрового Козацтва./ Авт.-сост. В. А. Міхєєв, В. Н. Хвостіченко. -К.: ІПШІ, «Наука і освіта», 2007
