= Villafáfila =

Coordinates: 41°51′N 5°37′W

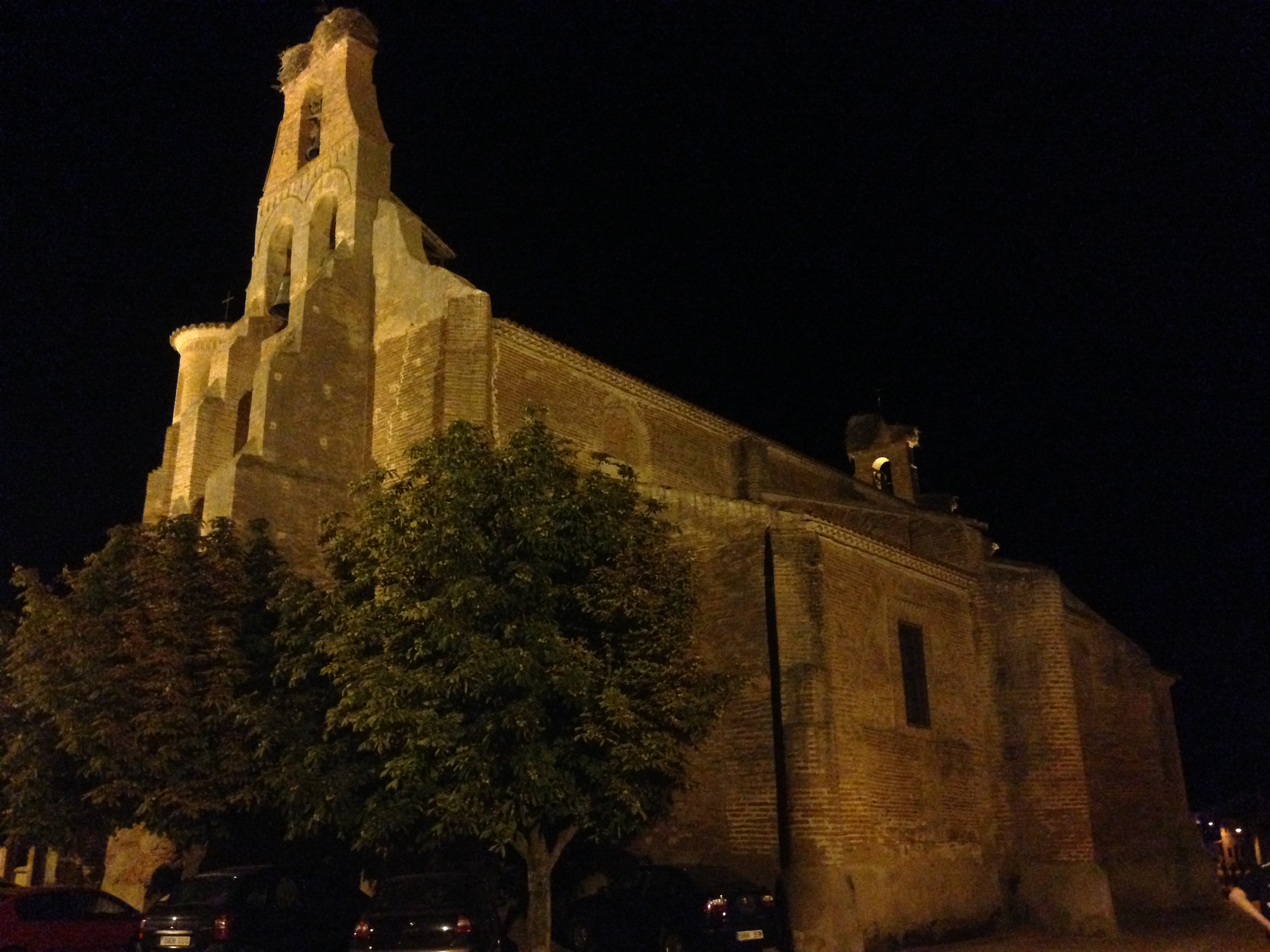

- Flag Coat of arms
- Interactive map of Villafáfila
- Country: Spain
- Autonomous community: Castile and León
- Province: Zamora
- Municipality: Villafáfila

Area
  - Total: 73 km^{2} (28 sq mi)

Population (2025-01-01)
  - Total: 429
  - Density: 5.9/km^{2} (15/sq mi)
- Time zone: UTC+1 (CET)
  - Summer (DST): UTC+2 (CEST)
- Website: Official website

Villafáfila is a municipality located in the province of Zamora, Castile and León, Spain. According to the 2004 census (INE), the municipality has a population of 628 inhabitants.
