= The Ukrainian Registered Cossacks =

Ukrainian public organization

Coordinates: 50°27′10.42″N 30°31′12.89″E

The All-Ukrainian public organization "The Ukrainian Registered Cossacks"
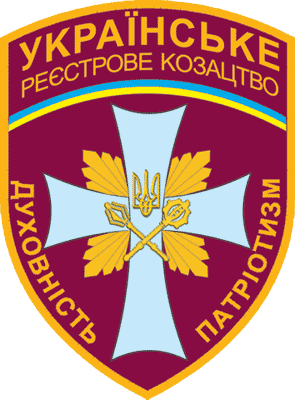
- Established: 2002
- Type: Non-governmental organization
- Leader: Anatolii Shevchenko
- Website: www.kozatstvo.org.ua

The Ukrainian Registered Cossacks (URC) (Ukrainian: Українське реєстрове козацтво); is a public organization that was registered by the Ministry of Justice of Ukraine on 8 July 2002. The URC consists of nearly 70,000 cossacks. It has a hymn, flag, logo, insignia, awards and operates the Ukraine of Cossacks newspaper.

The organization is one of hundreds of diverse associations of Cossacks in 21st century Ukraine.

== History ==
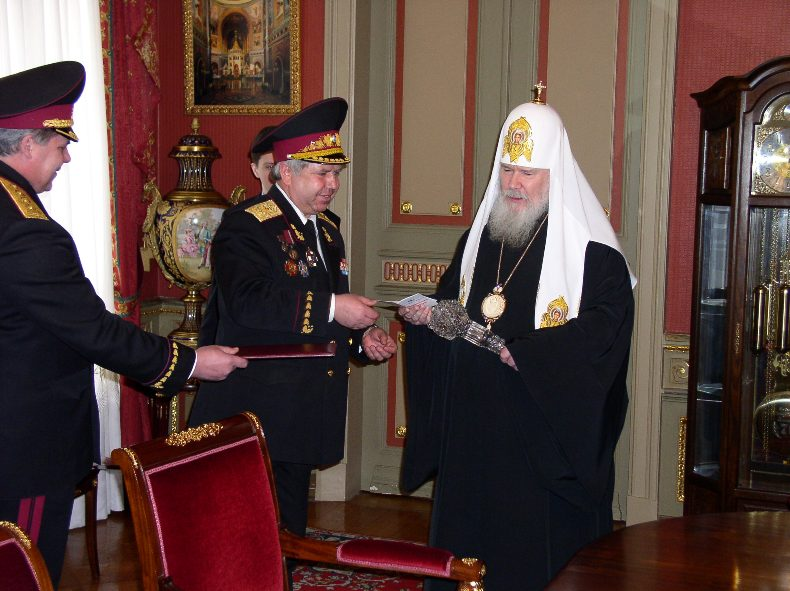
Gift to patriarch Alexy ІІ of a Crystal mace and the "Silver cossack Cross of ІІ degree" order of the URC

In the past, the Register was a list of the Ukrainian Cossacks in the state military service. The Cossacks were enlisted to placement on these special lists, which served as a foundation for the state to define their privileges and rights.

Though the Ukrainian Cossacks had been used by the government in wars from an early period, the project of creating a register was put forward in 1524, during the reign of Siguizmund the II Augustus, when Ukraine was a part of Poland. Three hundred Cossacks were included. The Cossacks were independent of local administration, they were not liable to pay taxes, and received other privileges, including the right to own the Trakhtemyrov Monastery (with lands spreading to Chyhyryn, for winter quarters, arsenals and hospitals). The Registered Cossacks also possessed kleinods.

At the beginning of 1646 there took place a secret meeting between Bohdan Khmelnytsky, the Cossack hetman, and Vladislav IV the Vasa, during which the Polish king promised to increase the Cossack register up to 12,000 and to restore the rights and freedoms of Cossacks. During the liberation struggle that followed, the number of the Registered Cossacks, which was a powerful force of the Ukrainian military, reached 100,000. Attempts to lower the number to 40 thousand (according to Treaty of Zboriv of 1649) and to 20,000 (as specified by the Treaty of Bila Tserkva of 1651) did not prove successful. The March Articles, approved by the Moscow Tsar in 1654, provided 60,000 register. In the course of time the dependence of Ukraine upon Moscoviya was the main factor that influenced development of the Registered Cossacks. The handover of Ukraine by Russia to Poland in 1667 led to destruction of the Right-bank Cossacks. In 1735 the Cossack register in Left-bank Ukraine was limited to 20,000 elective Cossacks, and in Sloboda Ukraine in 1700 were only 4200 Cossacks. After 1782, the Registered Cossacks were destroyed as an organization.

== Restoration ==
In 2002, in independent Ukraine, the Constituent Great Council restored the Ukrainian Registered Cossacks and approved the post of Hetman by its decree. Cossacks elected unanimously to this post a well-known scientist, Anatoliy Ivanovich Shevchenko, Corresponding member of the National Academy of Science of Ukraine, PhDoctor of Technical Science, PhDoctor of Theology, rector of the State University of Information Technology and Artificial Intelligence, and attached to MES of Ukraine.

The motto of the old Registered Cossacks was "Keep Honour – Build Glory!", but the motto of modern Registered Cossacks is "Towards a Powerful State and Prosperity of the Ukrainian People Through Spirituality and Patriotism of Each Person".

== The structure and strength ==
The URC are registered with provincial, municipal, district Cossack organizations in all oblasts of Ukraine, the Autonomous Republic of Crimea, Kyiv, and Sevastopol. It comprises almost 70,000 Cossacks. At the head of the URC is the hetman, with regional and local organizations led by the principal chieftains and the district chieftains, respectively. The organization is controlled by a General Staff of the URC in Kyiv, URC headquarters in regions, cities and district centers.

== Activities ==
The activities of the URC are spiritual-ideological, scientific-educational, national, economic, social and military. They conduct international activities, with branches in the United States, Australia, and Japan. According to the CDA, the main purpose for them is the presentation of Ukraine at the international level as an independent and democratic state.

On 24 March 2004, a delegation of the Ukrainian registered Cossacks was greeted at the Vatican by Pope John Paul II. Welcoming them, he said that he sincerely wishes the Ukrainian people and the good agreement and gave the blessing of God to the Ukrainian registered Cossacks and all the people of Ukraine.

On 24 March 2005, the URC delegation met in the patriarchal residence of the Patriarch of Moscow and All Russia Alexy II. During the meeting they discussed the problems of the Orthodox Church in Ukraine, as well as the strengthening of friendship between the Orthodox peoples of Ukraine and Russia. The Patriarch of the URC was awarded a crystal mace as a symbol of spiritual power and respect.

In 2008 the organization cooperated with the Party of Regions; and it claimed "We are supportive of all the parties that stand for the unification of the East and West of Ukraine, including the Party of Regions." Because of this cooperation with Party of Regions the Ivano-Frankivsk branch of the URC created a new organization.
