= Tourism in Riga =

Tourism in the capital of Latvia

Riga, the capital of Latvia, is one of the leading travel destinations in the Baltic region. In 2024, the city welcomed over 1.1 million international tourists. Tourists are mainly drawn to Riga because of its historical architecture, local culture and nature surrounding the city.

== History ==
Even though there is evidence that various settlements have existed in the area for much longer, Riga was officially founded in 1201 by Bishop Albert as a base for Christianization and trade in the Baltic region. Throughout its history, Riga has been under various rulers, including the Polish–Lithuanian Commonwealth, Sweden, and the Russian Empire. The city experienced rapid growth in the 19th century, becoming the third-largest city in the Russian Empire by population. Following Latvia's declaration of independence in 1918, Riga became the nation's capital. However, it endured occupation during World War II by both Nazi Germany and the Soviet Union, with significant destruction and loss of life, including a series of mass deportations by the Soviet Union in 1941 and 1945–1951, as well as the decimation of its Jewish community. After Latvia regained independence from Soviet Union in 1991, Riga has re-established itself as a cultural and economic centre, with its historic centre recognized as a UNESCO World Heritage Site for its Art Nouveau architecture and well-preserved medieval core.

== Tourist attractions ==
Riga offers a wide array of attractions catering to various interests. The historic centre features a unique blend of Gothic, Baroque, and Art Nouveau architecture. Key landmarks include the Riga Cathedral, the House of the Blackheads, and the Freedom Monument.

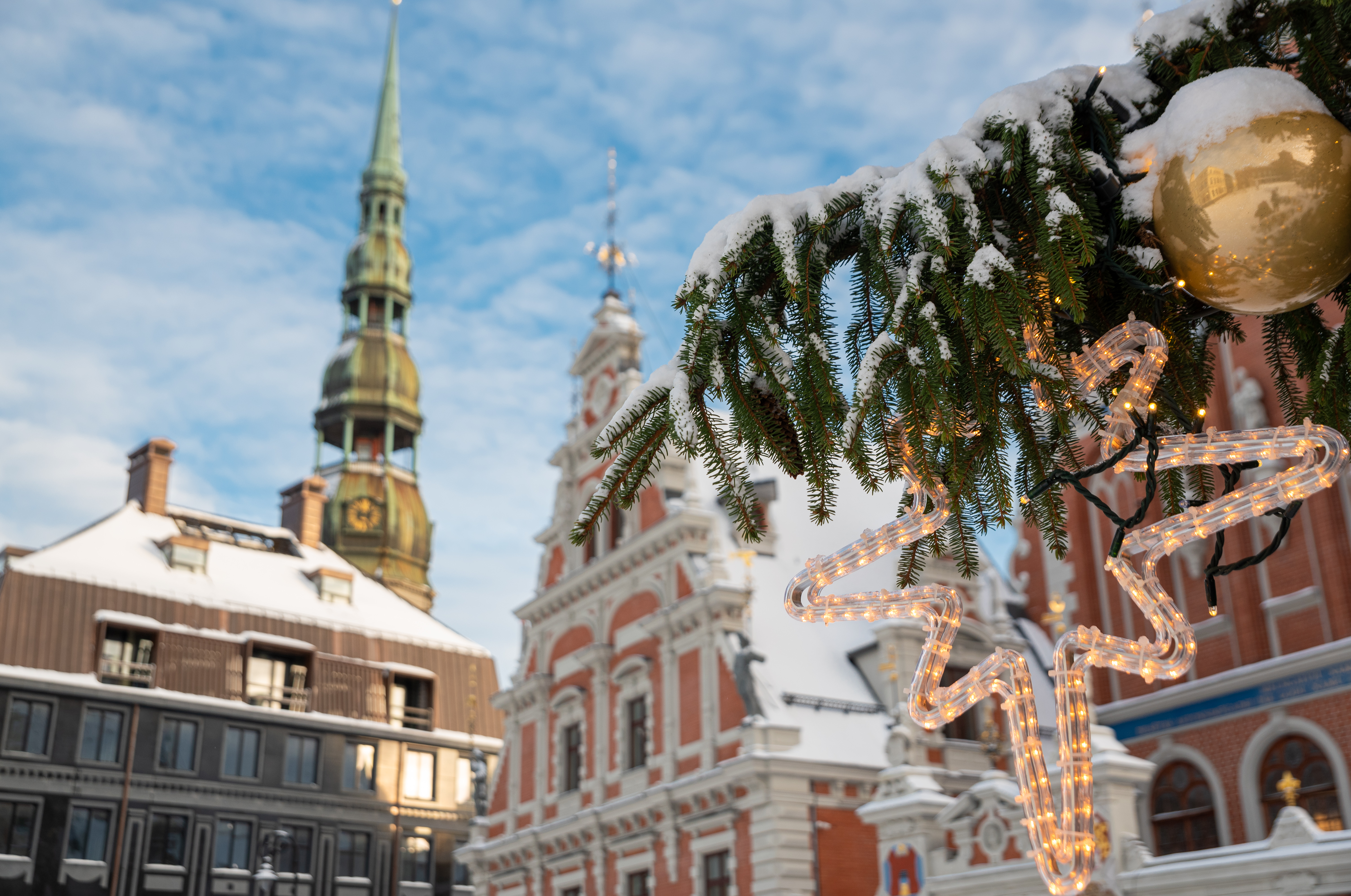
House of the Blackheads in winter, viewed from the Town Hall square

=== Culture ===
Theatre is very popular in Riga, with theatres like the Latvian National Theatre, the Daile Theatre and the New Riga Theatre often selling out tickets for plays months in advance. The Latvian National Opera and Ballet is also a beloved institution and one of the city's landmarks.

The most popular museums include the Latvian National Museum of Art, which hosts the largest collection of national art in Latvia and the Museum of the Occupation of Latvia which provides cultural and historical insight about life under the Soviet occupation. The Latvian National Museum of Natural History features interactive exhibits aimed at both adults and children. The Pauls Stradins Museum of the History of Medicine is a popular museum, housing more than 200 000 items related to the history of the profession. The Riga Motor Museum hosts a large collection of antique vehicles.

The Central Market, housed in former Zeppelin hangars, offers local food and crafts, and is popular with tourists. Meanwhile, the smaller Āgenskalns Market, after renovation 2022, offers both local and foreign delicacies, as well as a food court with various food vendors, and also serves as a venue for various events.

=== Leisure, recreation and sports ===
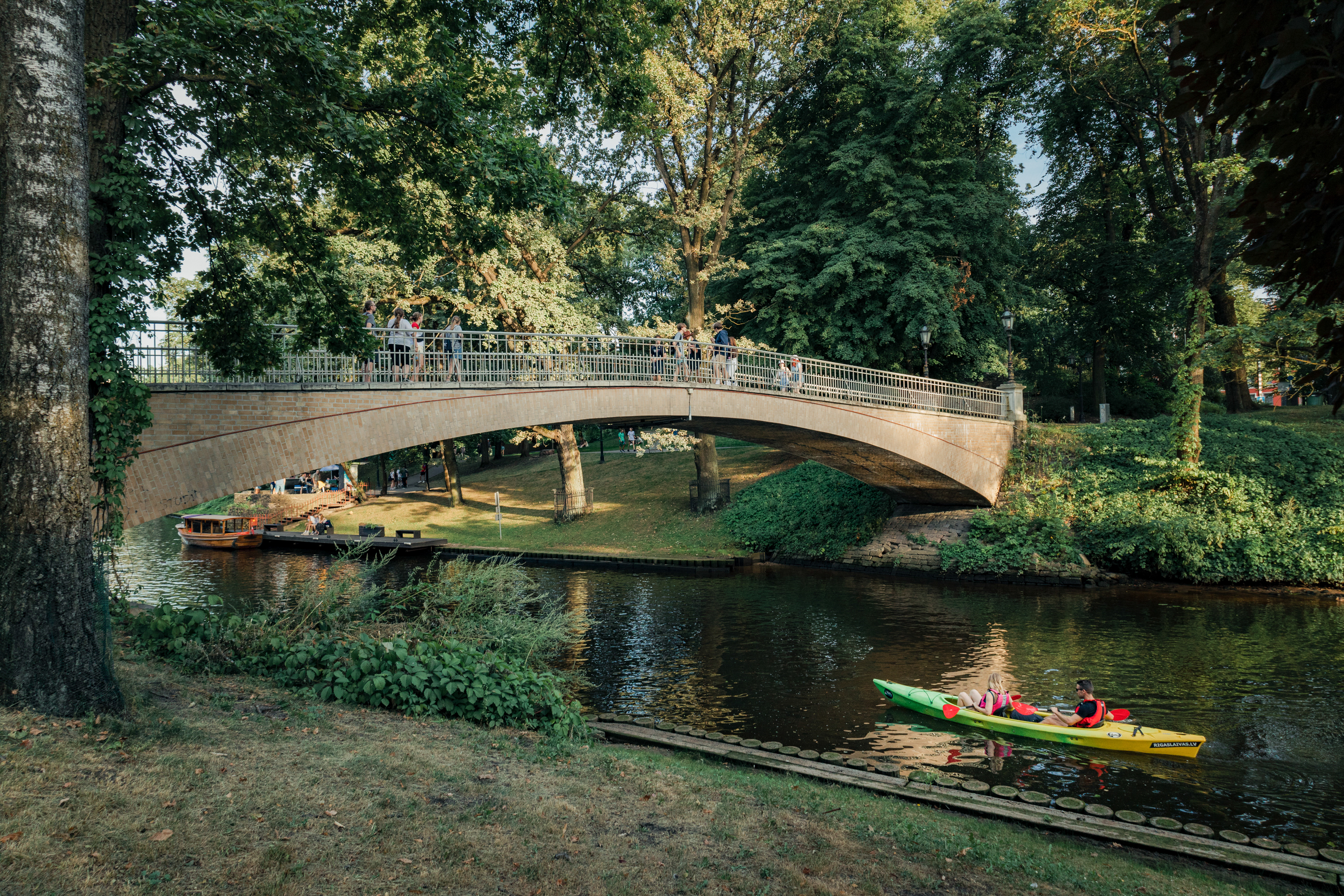
People boating on the City Canal in the Bastejkalns park

Riga supports a broad range of recreational activities throughout the year. Visitors can enjoy boating on the Daugava River and the city’s canal system in the summer or cross-county skiing at the Uzvaras parks in winter. Uzvaras parks also forms a part of the city’s extensive parklands, along with parks such as Vērmanes dārzs, Bastejkalns, Mežaparks and others. The Riga Zoo, located in Mežaparks, is one of the oldest in Northern Europe and offers a wide range of animal species and educational programmes.

The annual Rimi Riga Marathon attracts international participants – in 2025 it recorded participants from 109 countries.

=== Christmas and New years eve ===
During the winter holiday season, Riga transforms into a festive destination with decorative lighting, a large Christmas market and other seasonal events. The Dome Square and Esplanāde host traditional markets offering crafts, warm food, and local delicacies. A large Christmas tree, in homage to the city’s claim as the site of the world’s first decorated Christmas tree, is displayed in the Old Town.

=== Nightlife ===
The city's nightlife is varied, with options ranging from casual bars to craft breweries, cocktail lounges, nightclubs and live music venues. The Old Town is a central hub for evening entertainment, while other areas such as the Avoti district, Miera street and the Sporta street quarter offer more alternative experiences.

== Districts ==
Riga is composed of six administrative districts, which are further divided into 58 neighbourhoods. Each one of Riga’s districts offers unique cultural, historical, and recreational experiences, from medieval buildings and modern cityscapes to beaches and forests.

=== Vecrīga ===
Vecrīga, or the Old Town, is the historic heart of Riga. Characterized by its cobblestone streets and historic architecture, it houses significant landmarks such as St. Peter's Church, House of the Blackheads, and the Riga Cathedral. The area hosts numerous cafes, restaurants, and shops nestled within centuries-old buildings.

=== Centrs ===
Centrs, the central district of Riga, is notable for its extensive collection of Art Nouveau architecture, particularly along Alberta iela. This area is also home to the Latvian National Museum of Art, the Freedom Monument, and the Cathedral of the Nativity of Christ. Centrs serves as a commercial and cultural hub, featuring a variety of shops, eateries, and entertainment venues.

=== Grīziņkalns ===
Grīziņkalns is a residential neighborhood known for its green spaces and historical significance. Grīziņkalns Park is a popular spot for locals, offering recreational areas for jogging and dog walking. The district also features St. Paul's Lutheran Church, a neo-Gothic structure built in the late 19th century.

=== Mežaparks ===
Mežaparks is one of Riga's most picturesque and affluent neighborhoods. Located along the western shore of Lake Ķīšezers, it combines residential areas with extensive green spaces. The district is home to the Riga Zoo and the Mežaparks Great Bandstand, a venue for cultural events and concerts.

=== Āgenskalns ===
Āgenskalns, situated on the left bank of the Daugava River, is known for its wooden architecture and historic charm. The district features the recently renovated Āgenskalns Market, a local hub for food tourism. Its streets are lined with cafes, restaurants, and parks.

=== Ķīpsala ===
Ķīpsala is an island district offering a mix of modern residential buildings and restored wooden houses. It provides scenic views of Riga's Old Town across the Daugava River. The area is also home to the Žanis Lipke Memorial, commemorating a local resident who saved more than 50 Jews during the Nazi occupation of Riga.

=== Vecāķi ===
Vecāķi is a coastal neighborhood known for its sandy beaches along the Gulf of Riga. Popular among locals during the summer months, it offers a relaxing seaside atmosphere with cafes and recreational facilities. The area is accessible by train, making it a convenient getaway from the city center.

=== Outskirts ===
The outskirts of Riga encompass various suburban and rural areas that offer unique experiences. It can range from sparsely populated forested areas to high-density Soviet-era microdistricts. Each of these neighbourhoods offer a glimpse into the diverse lifestyles and histories that shape Riga's metropolitan landscape.

== Transport ==
Riga’s transportation infrastructure includes an integrated public transit system, an international airport, central coach and railway terminals, and a passenger port, all of which contribute to the city’s status as a key transit hub in the Baltic region.

=== Public transport ===
Public transportation in Riga is managed by Rīgas Satiksme, a municipally owned company overseeing trams, trolleybuses, and buses. The network comprises six tram routes, 22 trolleybus routes, and 52 bus routes, providing extensive coverage throughout the city and its suburbs.

=== Airport ===
Riga International Airport (RIX) is the largest airport in the Baltic states. It serves as the primary hub for airBaltic, Latvia's national airline. As of June 2024, the airport offers direct flights to more than 90 destinations, which makes it the central aviation gateway in the region.

=== Coach and railway station ===
The Riga Central Railway Station is undergoing significant redevelopment as part of the Rail Baltica project. This initiative aims to integrate the Baltic states into the European rail network by constructing a high-speed rail line connecting Tallinn, Riga and Vilnius to Warsaw.

The Riga International Coach Terminal, located at Prāgas iela 1, adjacent to the Central Market and opposite the Central Railway Station, is a key facility for both domestic and international bus services.

=== Port ===
The Riga Passenger Port is strategically located near the city's Old Town, offering convenient access for travelers. The port accommodates various vessels, including cruise ships, ferries, and yachts, with facilities capable of handling ships up to 320 meters in length. Annually, the port serves approximately one million passengers, contributing to Riga's maritime connectivity.

== Tourism tax ==
As of 1 January 2023, Riga introduced a municipal tourism tax, whereby visitors are charged a fee of EUR 1 per person per night.

== See also ==
- List of tourist attractions in Riga
