= Āgenskalns =

Neighbourhood of Riga, Latvia

- Neighbourhood
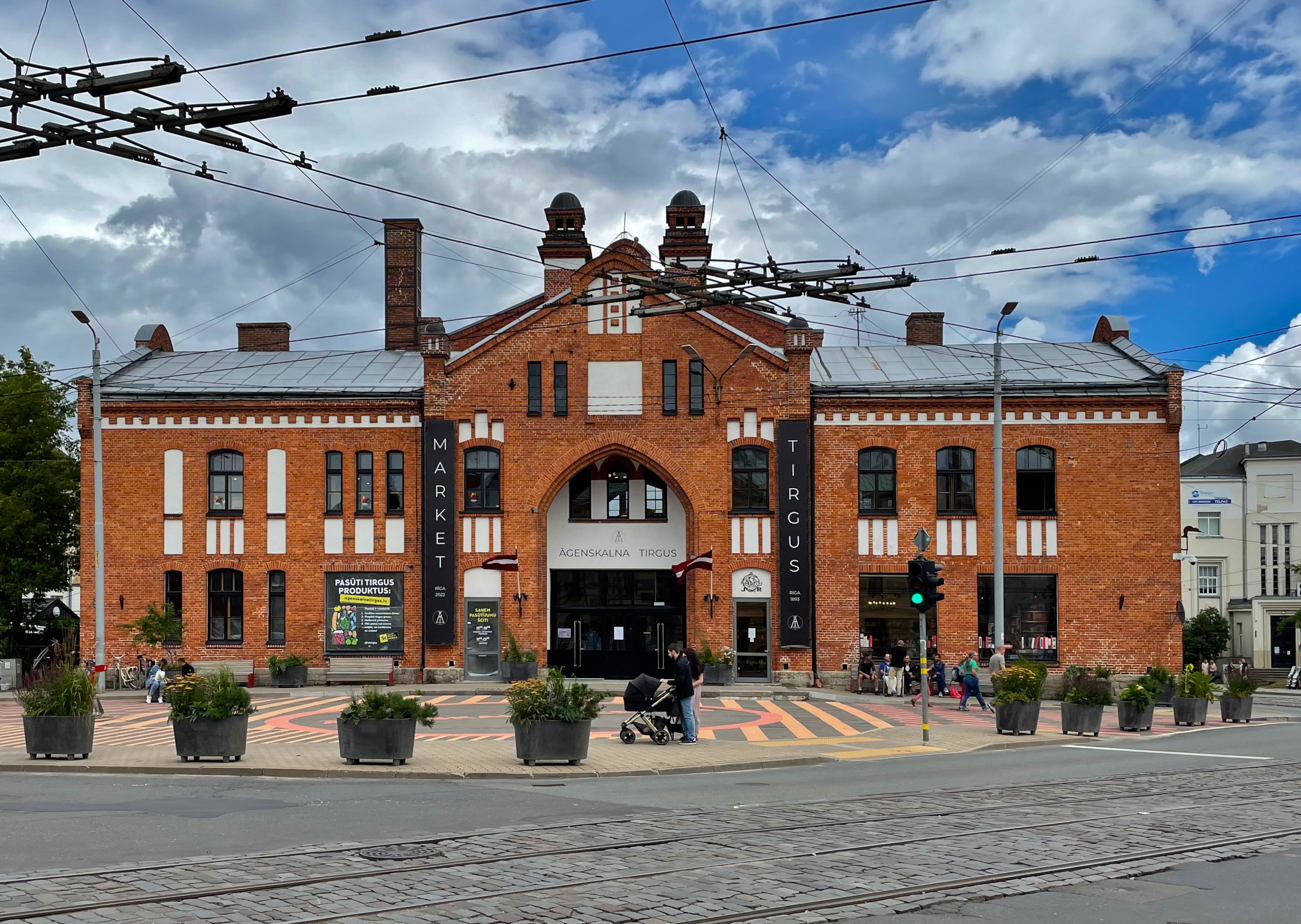
- Āgenskalns Market

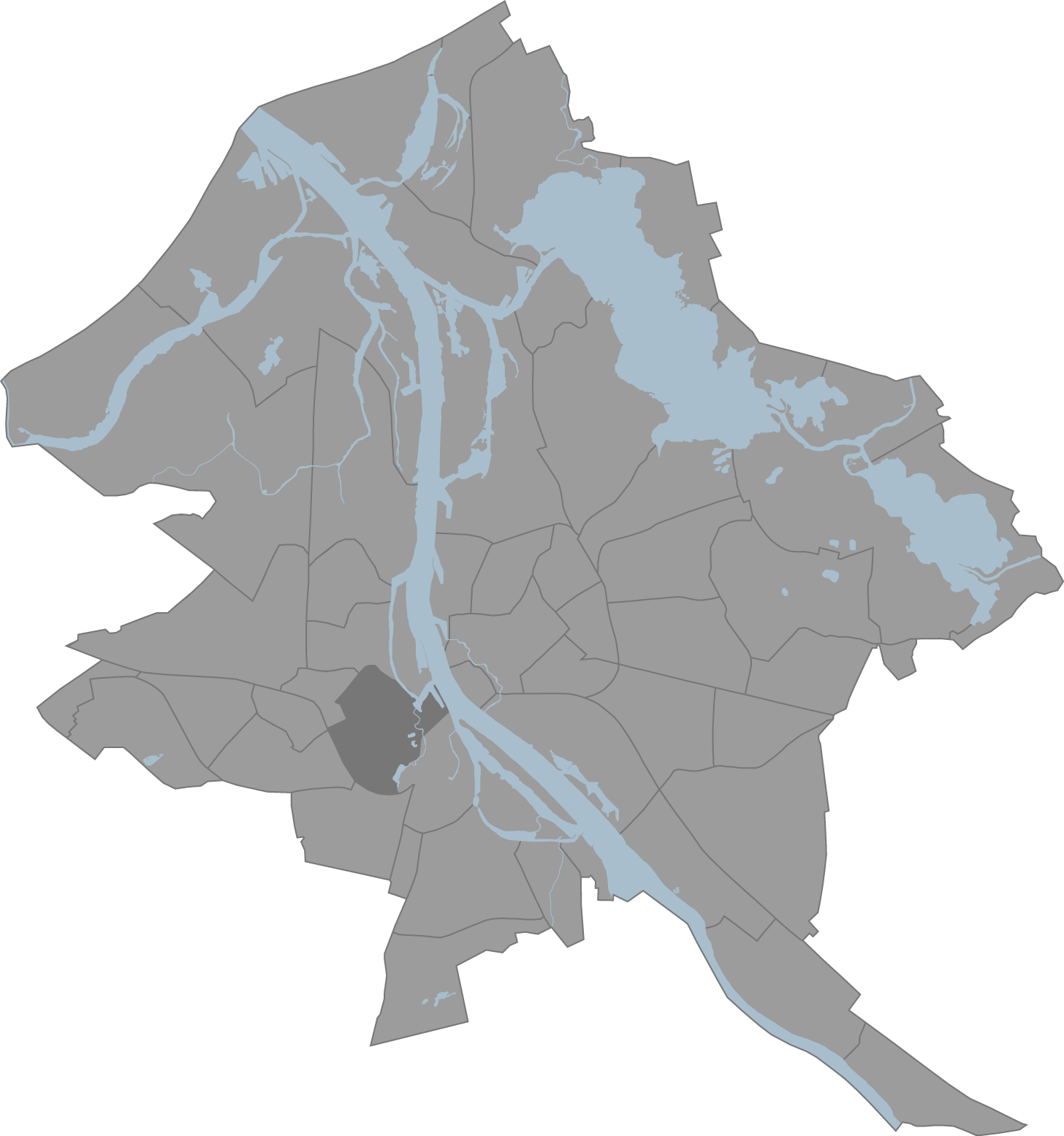
- Location of Āgenskalns in Riga

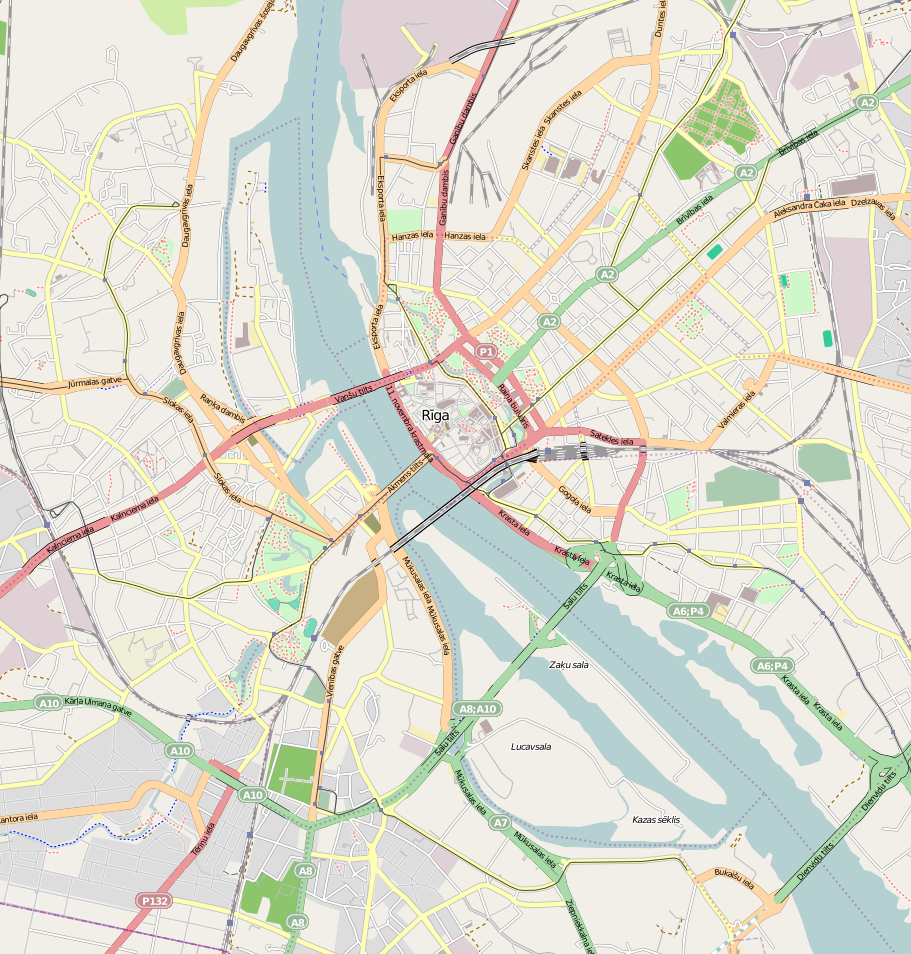
- Location within Riga
- Coordinates: 56°56′N 24°04′E
- Country: Latvia
- City: Riga
- Districts: Zemgale Suburb; Kurzeme District

Area
  - Total: 4.613 km^{2} (1.781 sq mi)

Population (2024)
  - Total: 23,223
  - Density: 5,034/km^{2} (13,040/sq mi)
- Postal codes: LV-1002, LV-1004, LV-1046, LV-1048
- Website: apkaimes.lv

Āgenskalns (historically known also as Hāgenskalns or Hagensberg) is a district in Riga, located on the left bank of the Daugava, an old neighbourhood, mainly built in the late 19th to early 20th century. The total area of Āgenskalns is 4,6 km^{2}, which is a lot less than other districts of Riga.

== History ==
First known building of Āgenskalns and whole Pārdaugava was the fortified Māra mill, which was mentioned already in 1226. As evidenced by maps of the 17th century, the village of Āgenskalns started next to crossroads of current Meža, Sētas and Nometņu Street and continued to develop alongside Nometņu Street. During the 17th century, Āgenskalns was sparsely populated. Most of the non-auxiliary members of the Latvian trade house dominated there and also mercenaries - fishermen, anchors, wine barrel carriers, boatmen and others.

Name “Āgenskalns” came from the manor of Henrih fon Hagen, who was a judge in the 17th century (from German Hagenshof, nowadays known as Švarcmuiža), and who was the owner of lands alongside Rankas dam and Kuldīgas Street. During the Great Northern War, Āgenskalns was destroyed, but later restored.

During the French invasion of Russia, in fear of Napoleon's troops, all the buildings of Āgenskalns were burned down, so the buildings that are there nowadays started to develop in the first half of the 19th century. The layout of buildings was made without a certain plan and that is why street network between Nometņu and Eduarda Smiļģa Street is quite chaotic. Nowadays this territory is a national monument of urban construction and is known for its great wooden architecture.

== Architecture ==
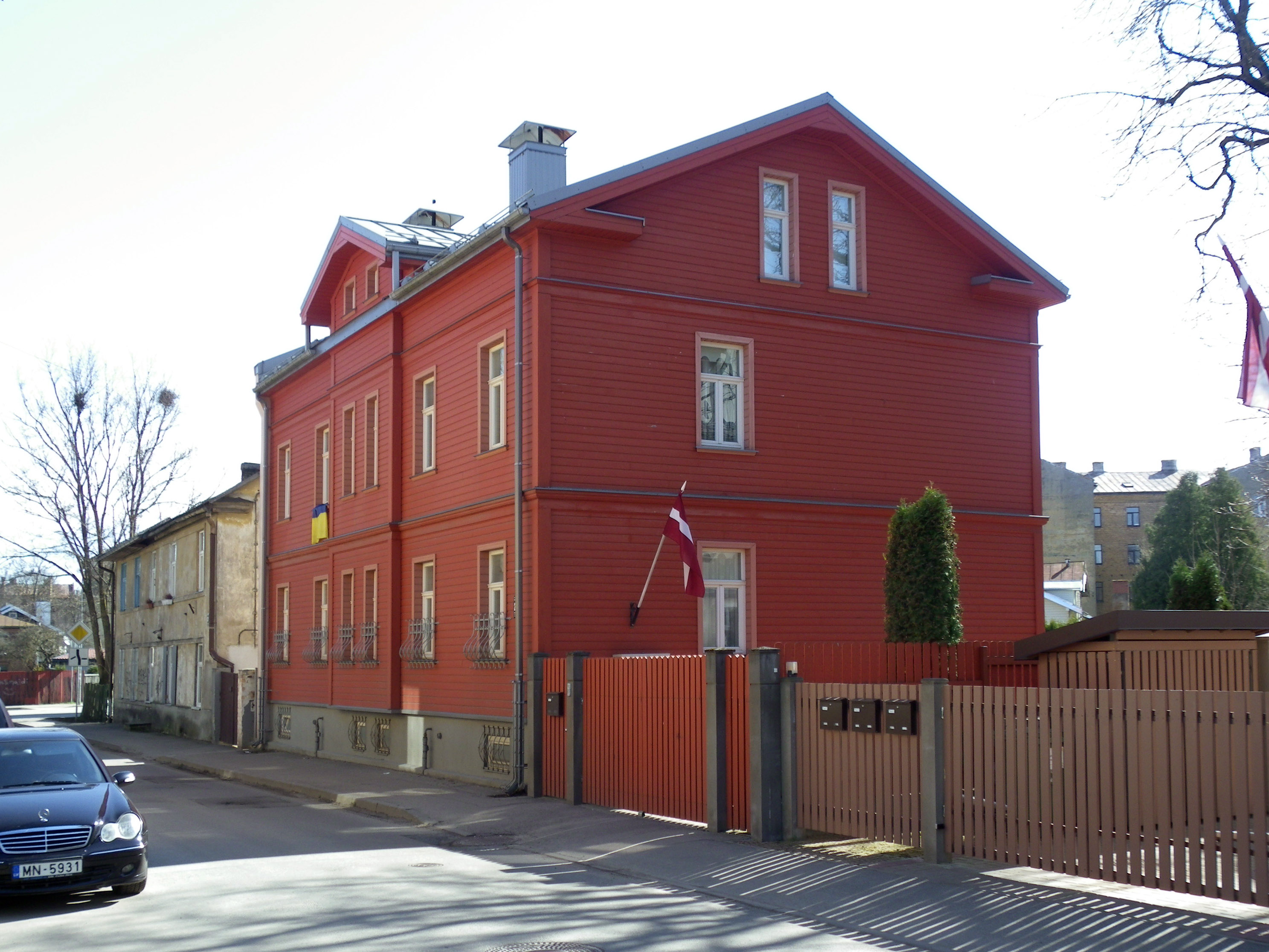
Typical wooden apartment building

Oldest building in Āgenskalns is the Hartmann manor, located in Kalnciema street 28/30. Āgenskalns is a vivid example of Art Nouveau and German Balts architectural symbiosis. One of the best examples of this is the water tower of Āgenskalns, which was projected by Wilhelm Bockslaff and built in 1910. – entrance of the water tower is decorated with various geometric ornaments that end with a triangular timpanon; other Art Nouveau features can also be seen there (stylized imperial eagle etc.). In the nearby Margrietas street you can find one of Mikhail Eisenstein projected buildings, which shows a strong influence of historicism. In Āgenskalns there are many residential and commercial houses, which have been built in the 19th and 20th century, where you can find the influence of Art Nouveau. One of the most prominent Art Nouveau complexes is the Market of Āgenskalns, which was built after a project of Reinhold Schmaeling, current Market building was built from 1911 until 1924. Pauls Stradiņš Clinical University Hospital was also built after one of his project and is located in Āgenskalns, Pilsoņu Street 13. Other mentionable Art Nouveau features can be found in Arcadia Park (Latvian: Arkādijas parks), made after a project of Georg Kuphaldt in 1910.

Āgenskalns is also known for its wooden architecture, with a large number of wooden residential and commercial buildings. A notable example of this is the Kalnciema Quarter - a renovated 19th-century complex of wooden houses.

== Notable places in Agenskalns ==
- Āgenskalns Market - Built in 1911 – 1914
- Railroad Museum
- Eduards Smiļģis Theatre Museum
- Uzvaras Park
- Jānis Akuraters Museum
- Ojārs Vācietis Museum
- Pauls Stradiņš Clinical University Hospital - built in 1908 - 1910

Schools

- University of Latvia Faculty of Physics and Mathematics
- Riga Technical University Faculty of Engineering Economics and Management; Faculty of Computer Science and Information Technology
- University of Business, Arts and Technology
- Emīls Dārziņš Music School

== Notable people ==
Lived in Āgenskalns:

- Jānis Akuraters (1876–1937), Latvian poet
- Johann Georg Hamann (1730–1788), German Lutheran philosopher
- Johann Gottfried Herder (1744–1803), German philosopher
- Viesturs Kairišs (b. 1971), Latvian opera, movie and theatre director
- Andra Neiburga (1957–2019), Latvian writer
- Katrīna Neiburga (b. 1978), Latvian contemporary artist
- Eduards Smiļģis (1886–1966), Latvian actor and theatre director
- Pauls Stradiņš (1896–1958), Latvian professor, physician, and surgeon
- Ojārs Vācietis (1933–1983), Latvian writer and poet

== Gallery ==
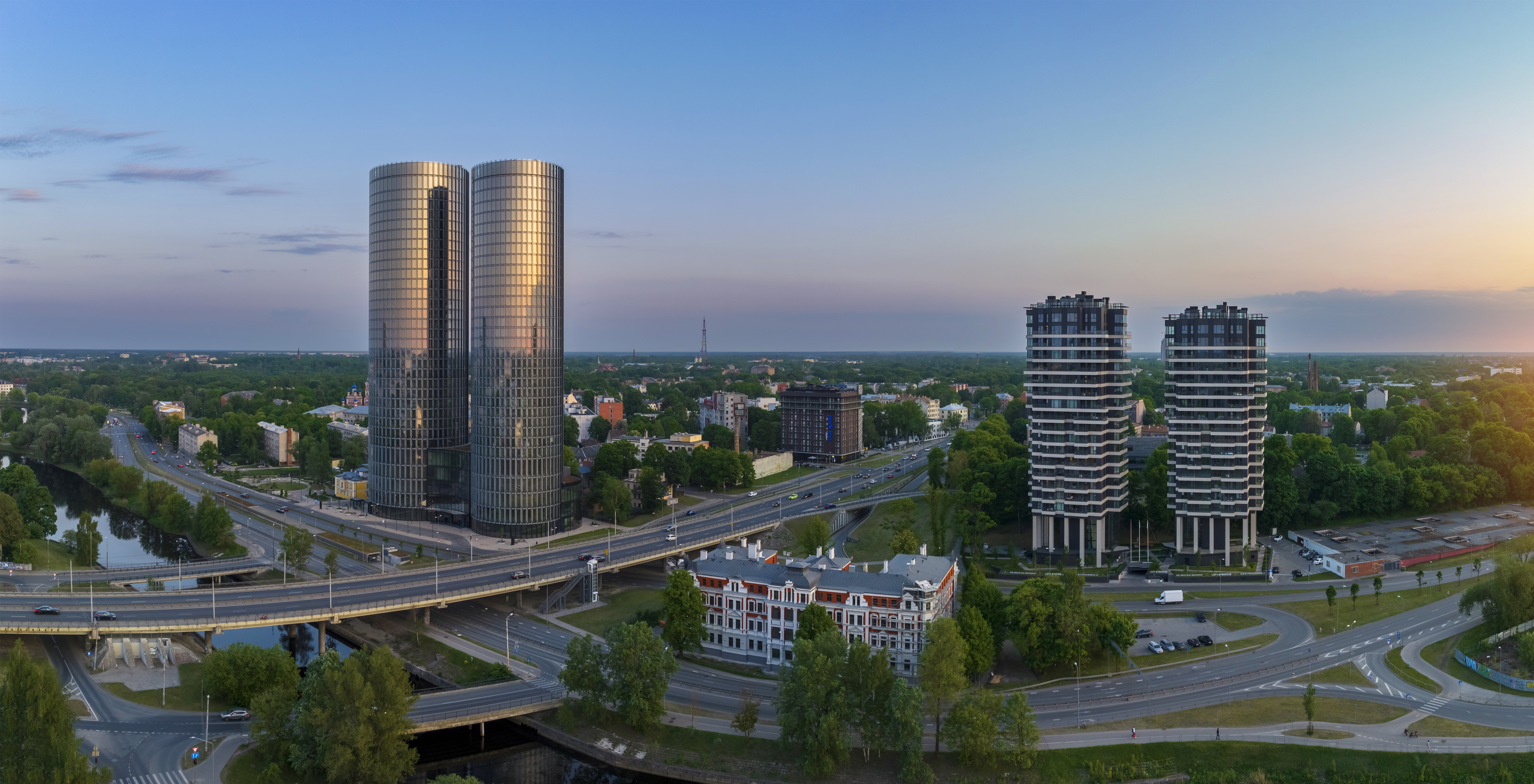
The Eastern edge of the neighbourhood, near the Zunds channel

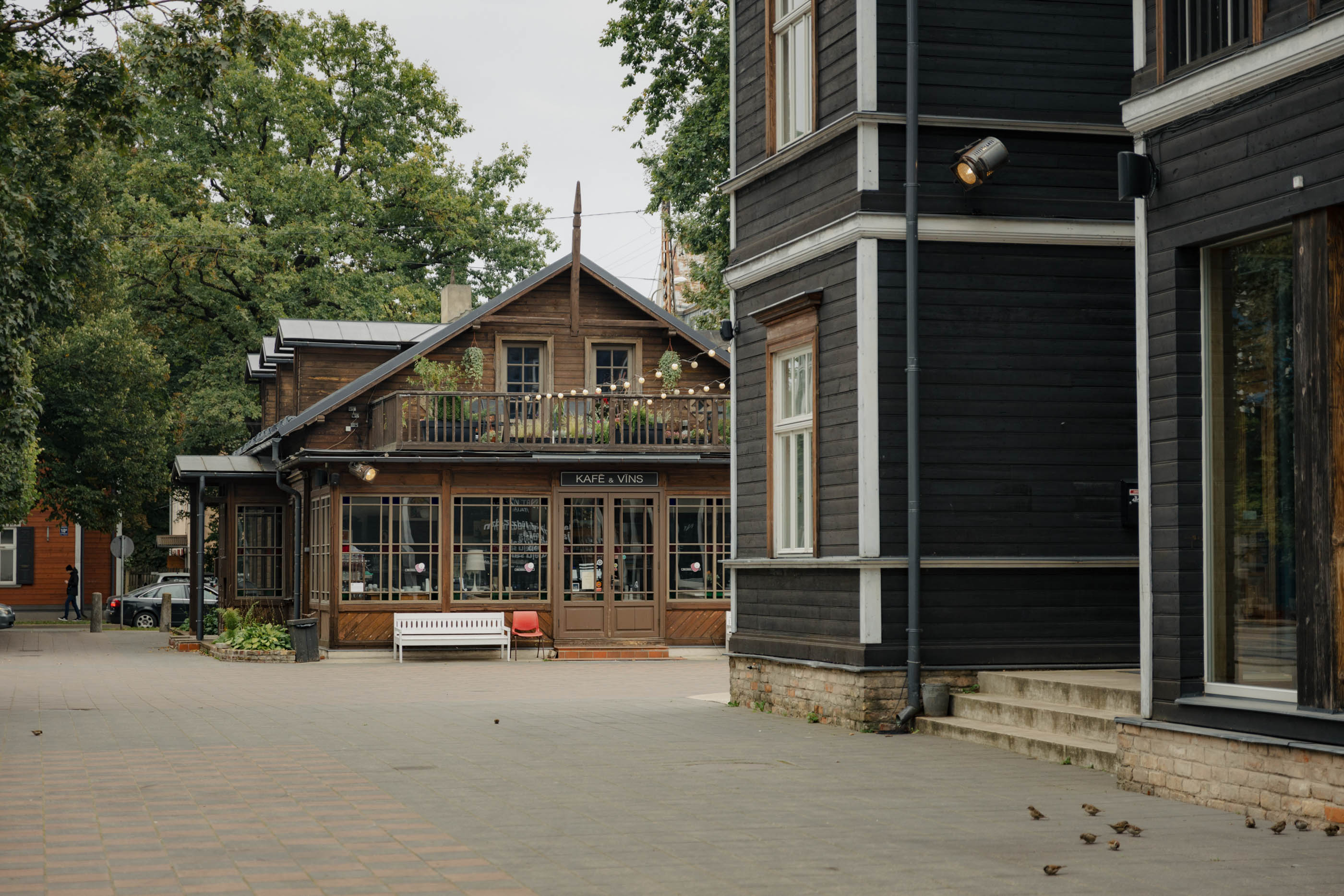
Kalnciema Quarter
