= List of tourist attractions in Riga =

This is a list of tourist attractions in Riga, the capital of Latvia.

== Old town ==
- The Lutheran cathedral - the largest church in the Baltic states. Built in the 13th century, it was modified several times in its history. It has a magnificent organ that dates from 1844. The Dome square next to the cathedral also hosts the Riga Christmas Market during the holiday season.
- House of the Blackheads - a modern replica of a building that was destroyed in World War II. Considered as one of the architectural landmarks of the city.
- The Powder Tower (Pulvertornis) - the only tower that remains from the original city walls; the Latvian Museum of War is located inside.
- Riga Museum of History and Navigation (Rīgas vēstures un kuģniecības muzejs) - one of the largest and oldest museums in Latvia and Baltic states.
- Riga Castle (Rīgas Pils) - houses the Museum of Latvian History and the president's official residence
- St James's Roman Catholic cathedral.
- St. John's Church - a small 13th-century chapel, behind Saint Peter's Church.
- Saint Peter's Church - with its 123-metre-high (404 ft) tower, that's available as a viewing platform.
- The Museum of the Occupation of Latvia (Latvijas Okupācijas muzejs) - documents the seizure and occupation of Latvia by various invaders from 1940 to 1991.
- Three Brothers - the oldest residential complex in Riga, dating back to the 15th century.

== The centre ==
- Art Nouveau architecture
- Freedom Monument - a 42.7 metre high monument symbolising the Latvian nation's strife for freedom and independence. One of the most well-known landmarks of Riga.
- Latvian National Opera and Ballet - a classicist building built in 1863.
- Latvian National Museum of Art - the largest collection of Latvian art, housed in a building built in 1905 and notably renovated in 2016.
- Riga Circus (Rīgas cirks) - the only permanently situated circus in the Baltic States.
- Vērmane Garden (Vērmanes dārzs) - the oldest public garden in Riga.
- Wooden architecture.

== Other parts of the city ==
- Āgenskalns Market - an art nouveau building designed by Reinhold Schmaeling, renovated in 2022. After the renovation, it also serves as a venue for events.
- Central Market - Open since 1930, the most popular culinary tourism attraction in Riga.
- The Ethnographic Open-Air Museum of Latvia (Latvijas Etnogrāfiskais brīvdabas muzejs) - an open-air museum displaying houses, farm buildings, and a church, representing rural life going back hundreds of years; situated along Jugla Lake.
- Kalnciema Quarter - a renovated complex of 19th-century wooden buildings. It now hosts a Wooden Architecture Centre that's open to the public and a farmer's market every Saturday, as well as various shops, cafes and spaces for events.
- National Library of Latvia (Latvijas Nacionālā bibliotēka) - the latest project of Gunārs Birkerts, called the Castle of Light (Gaismas pils).
- Riga Motor Museum (Rīgas motormuzejs) - a collection of retro motorcycles and automobiles, including some of the first motorcycles and remnants of the Soviet era, for example, Brezhnev's and Stalin's armoured limousines with waxworks of these political figures; located in Mežciems.
- Riga Radio and TV Tower - the third highest self-supporting tower in Europe.
- Riga Zoo and Mežaparks
