= Neiburga =

Neiburga is a surname. Notable people with the surname include:

- Andra Neiburga (1957–2019), Latvian writer and translator
- Katrīna Neiburga (born 1978), Latvian artist
