= Tourism in Latvia =

Tourist arrivals of 2024 in %

Tourism in Latvia is an emerging industry in the nation of Latvia. 2.8 million visitors were recorded in 2018, an increase of 8% compared to 2017. In 2016, tourism contributed 4.5% of Latvia's GVA, and counted for 1.3 million euros in export revenue, and tourism-related industries accounted for 8.5% of total employment, or 77100 jobs in total. This was accompanied by significant growth in the number of hotels and accommodations in Latvia, rising 37% from 607 in 2018 to 831 in 2018, according to a 2020 OECD report. Most tourists in Latvia come from neighbouring countries, primarily Russia, Germany, and the other two Baltic states, Estonia and Lithuania. Most tourists stayed in Riga, the national capital. However, domestic tourism has been on the rise in Latvia, with less and less Latvians willing to travel abroad.

The Ministry of Economics manages tourism policy in Latvia, as determined by the 1998 Tourism Law, and owns the Investment and Development Agency of Latvia, an organization responsible for enactment of tourism policy in Latvia. The total budget for tourism in Latvia in 2018 was 2.6 million euros, combining funding from the state, the European Regional Development Fund, and from the European Destinations of Excellence programme. In 2014, the Ministry of Economics developed the 2014-20 Tourism Development Guidelines, a plan similar to that of neighbouring Estonia's National Tourism Development Plan (NTDP), and along with the Investment and Development Agency's Tourism Marketing Strategy 2018-23, aim to increase the knowledge of Latvia as a tourist destination and to run tourism in Latvia sustainably, and to better educate the Latvian service sector in tourism management.

== History ==
The history of tourism in modern Latvia primarily begins with the country's independence from the Russian Empire. In 1929, the Ministries of the Interior, Foreign Affairs, and the Railway Central Board established the Latvian Central Tourism Society which transformed the prior tourism movements greatly to match Western European standards, and two years later, in 1931, the Bureau of Tourism at the Foreign Ministry was established. Over time, Latvia became the most visited country in the Baltic and Scandinavian regions: the number of foreign tourists in Latvia in 1931 was 85,719, compared to 40,000 in Lithuania, 37,470 in Finland and 71,975 in Norway. In 1937, there were 185 hotels, 68 boarding houses and 441 tourist houses in Latvia, where travellers stayed for 57,279 nights.

After World War II and the incorporation of Latvia into the Soviet Union, the Latvian Republican Tourism And Excursion Board was established in 1946 and started to manage tourism in Latvia since 1962, along with the help of Soviet state-owned travel agency Intourist until the Soviet Union's collapse in 1991.

The collapse of the Soviet Union led to large-scale reforms within the tourism industry in Latvia. From 1993 till 2003, the responsibility of tourism in Latvia belonged to the Ministry of Environmental Protection and Regional Development.

== Effects of climate change ==
The effects of climate change and global warming are being felt all across Europe, and Latvia is no exception. However, the impact of climate change in Latvia is expected to be positive for Latvia, and for the wider Central and Eastern Europe in general. In the future, for instance, the Baltic States – so far characterised by cultural and rural tourism – could attract more seaside tourists.

== Notable tourist attractions ==
=== National parks ===
- Gauja National Park

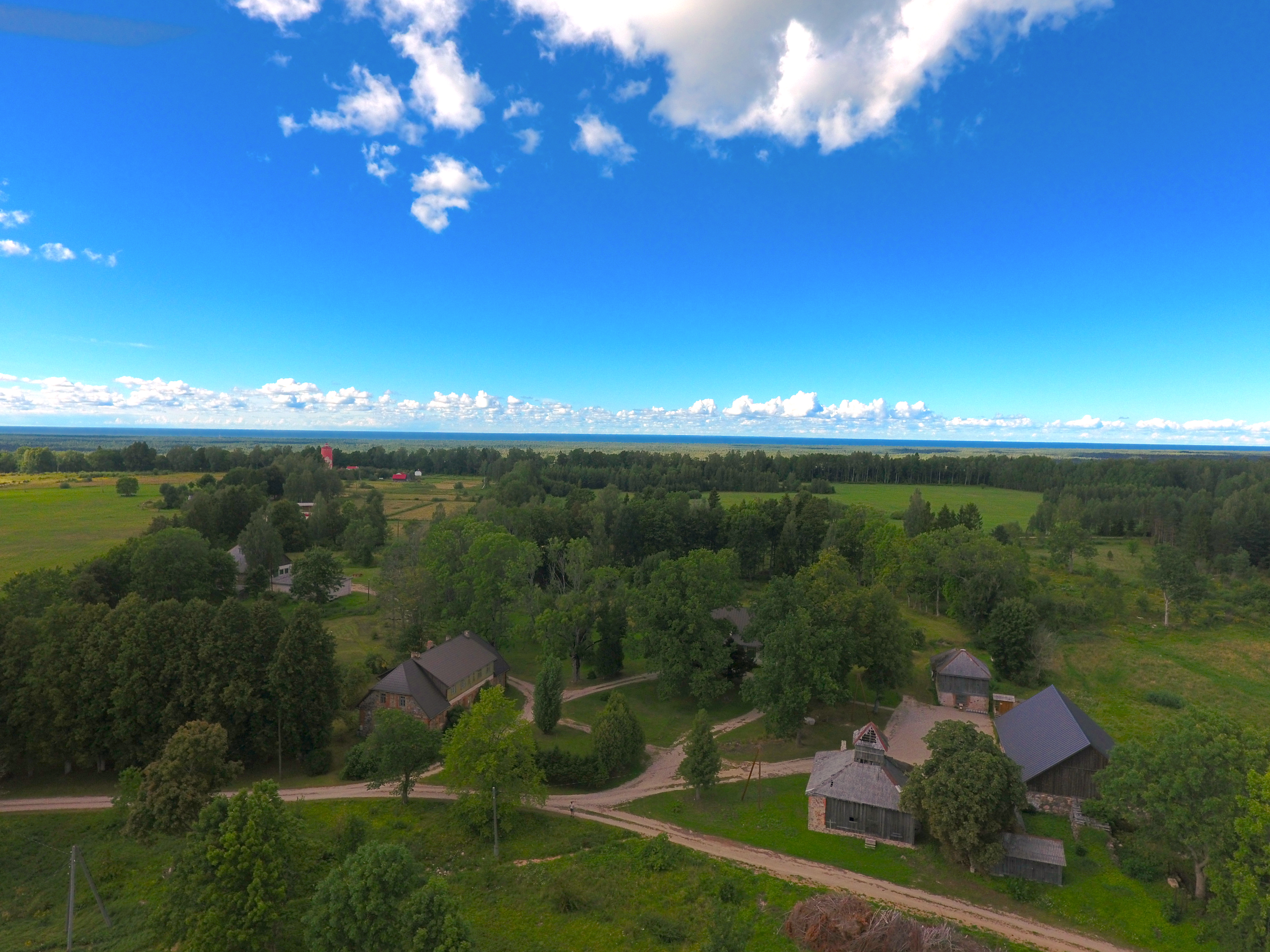
Slītere National Park

- Slitere National Park
- Kemeri National Park
- Razna National Park

=== UNESCO World Heritage Sites ===
- Historic Centre of Riga (Vecrīga)
- Historic Centre of Kuldīga
- Struve Geodetic Arc

== See also ==
- Tourism in Riga, the capital and largest city of Latvia
- Culture of Latvia
- Transport in Latvia
- Tourism in Estonia
- Tourism in Lithuania
