= Rīga dimd =

Traditional Latvian folk song

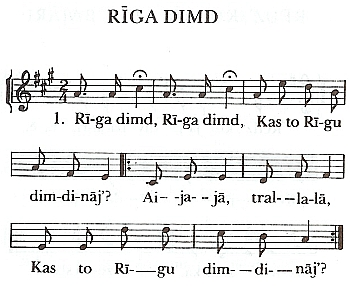
Sheet music

Choir recording in 19th century

Rīga dimd (English: Riga resounds) is the title of a traditional Latvian folk song that is best known as a musical composition by Jānis Cimze. Cimze's first composition of the song is from 1872, and the composition was performed 1873 at the I All-Latvian Singing Festival by a male choir. The tower bell music of the Saint Peter's Church in Riga, Latvia, plays Rīga dimd five times a day.

== Lyrics ==
Latvian

Rīga dimd, Rīga dimd!
Kas to Rīgu dimdināj'?
Aijaijā Tralalā
Kas to Rīgu dimdināj'?

Tai meitai pūru kala
Kam trejādi bāleliņ'
Aijaijā Tralalā
Kam trejādi bāleliņ', bāleliņ'

Tēva brālis pūru kala
Mātes brālis atslēdziņ'
Aijaijā Tralalā
Mātes brālis atslēdziņ'

Viņas pašas īstais brālis
Zelta vāku liedināj'
Aijaijā Tralalā
Zelta vāku liedināj'

English

Riga resounds, Riga resounds
Who made Riga so resound?
Aijaijā Tralalā
Who made Riga so resound?

Those forging a dowry for that maiden
The one with three ilk of brothers
Aijaijā Tralalā
The one with three ilk of brothers

Her father's brother forged the dowry
Her mother's brother forged the key
Aijaijā Tralalā
Brother to her mother forged the key

Her own true brother
Cast its lid of gold
Aijaijā Tralalā
Cast its lid of gold
