= Jānis Cimze =

Russian composer

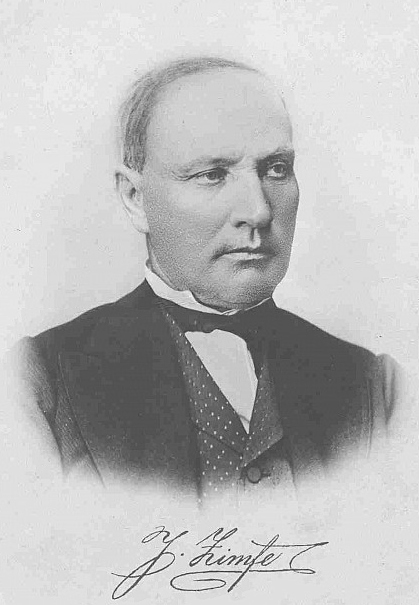
- Born: 3 July 1814; Rauna parish, Vidzeme, Russian Empire
- Died: 22 October 1881 (aged 67); Valka, Russian Empire
- Occupations: Pedagogue; Organist; Composer

Jānis Cimze (3 July/21 June 1814 — 22 October/10 October 1881) was a Latvian pedagogue, collector and harmoniser of folk songs, organist, founder of Latvian choral music and initiator of professional Latvian music. He is buried at the Lugaži Cemetery.

== Early life ==
Cimze was born at the Rauna Manor Cimze dairy farm (hoflage) to the family of a manor's dairy farm overseer, Andreas (Ansis) Cimze, and his wife, Anne, as the first of 8 children. His initial education came from Rauna Parish School, where he also learned to play the organ. From the age of sixteen, he worked as a private tutor; later, he taught at Valmiera Parish School and served as an organist.

== Education ==
In 1836, Cimze went to Germany to study at Weissenfels Teachers' Seminary, which he finished in 1838. This was where he learned to play the violin and piano and improved his skills as an organist. In 1838—39, he was an external student at Berlin University, where he attended lectures on mathematics, didactics, and the theory of music. His music professor was Ludwig Christian Erk, a collector, harmoniser, publisher, and researcher of German folk songs.

== Vidzeme Teachers' Seminary ==
Upon returning from Germany, Cimze headed the Vidzeme Teachers' Seminary from 1839 until the end of his life, where he taught future teachers how to conduct choirs and harmonise folk songs. Cimze followed the principles of Johann Pestalozzi and Adolph Diesterweg, and all education was conducted in German.

During his forty-two years at the Teachers' Seminary, Cimze educated more than four hundred students who subsequently became teachers in Latvian and Estonian. Being a teacher in the 19th century also meant being an educator, a musician, a literary and public figure. In the second half of the 19th century, teachers organised choirs and worked with them and cultural societies.

== Musical legacy ==
Jānis Cimze promoted the development of Latvian choral singing and the cultivation of a cappella performance. His collection of songs for choirs, "Dziesmu rota" (A Garland of Songs), was published in eight parts between 1872–84. This first-ever professional collection of songs for choirs in Latvia formed the foundation for Latvian choir culture. Parts II (1872), III (1874), IV (1875) and VII (1884) of "Dziesmu rota", which go under the title of "Lauku puķes" (Wild Flowers), are the first collections of Latvian folk songs arrangements and represent several folk song genres: songs of seasons and family customs, work songs, farewell songs of recruits and conscripts, songs of orphans as well as songs for games and lullabies.

Jānis Cimze was the first prominent Latvian figure in music, whose example inspired an extensive collection, publishing, arrangement, and research of folk music. It fostered the development of the choir-singing movement and the creation of new, original compositions. Thanks to the activities of Cimze and his students, the first All-Estonian (1869) and All-Latvian (1873) Song Festivals were held. Cimze was among those who conceived the idea of the event, while his student and associate Indriķis Zīle was one of the chief conductors at the Song Festival. The programme of the Song Festival included several arrangements of folk songs by Cimze and his brother Dāvid. Cimze's German sentiments surfaced as he compared the three brothers making the dowry-chest for their sister in the song "Rīga dimd" (Riga resounds) to the German nobility, the Lutheran Church, and the German Riga. For this, he was severely criticised by Atis Kronvalds.

== Sources ==
- Apinis, Pēteris (2006). A Hundred Great Latvians. Riga: Nacionālais apgāds. ISBN 9984-26-288-X. OCLC 238892134.
