= Purvītis Prize =

Latvian visual art award

- Native name: Purvīša balva
- Awarded for: Contemporary visual art in Latvia
- Country: Latvia
- Reward: €28,500
- Established: 2008
- First award: 2009
- Website: purvisabalva.lv

The Purvītis Prize (Latvian: Purvīša balva) is a biennial Latvian visual art award named after the painter Vilhelms Purvītis. It is awarded to an artist or artist group representing Latvian art, and the winner is selected by an international jury from a shortlist of finalists. The prize was founded in early 2008 and first awarded in 2009.

== History and format ==
The award is named after Vilhelms Purvītis, a central figure in Latvian landscape painting and Latvian art education. It was established for professional visual art and is awarded once every two years. The first award ceremony took place in February 2009, when Katrīna Neiburga received the award for her video work Solitude.

Candidates are selected over a two-year period before the award ceremony. For the 2025 prize, an independent expert working group evaluated work by 24 artists and artist groups from the period from 1 January 2023 to 31 December 2024 before naming the finalists. The final winner is chosen by an international jury of art professionals.

The main prize has included a monetary award of €28,500 before taxes in recent editions. A separate lifetime contribution award was first presented in 2019, when the painter Džemma Skulme received it.

== Winners ==
Year	Winner	Work
2009	Katrīna Neiburga	Solitude
2011	Kristaps Ģelzis	Varbūt (Maybe)
2013	Andris Eglītis	Zemes darbi
2015	Miķelis Fišers	Netaisnība
2017	Krišs Salmanis, Anna Salmane and Kristaps Pētersons	Dziesma
2019	Ieva Epnere	Dzīvo atmiņu jūra
2021	Amanda Ziemele	Kvantu matu implanti
2023	Ance Eikena	Our Heavenly Father
2025	Romāns Korovins	LET'S DIE TOGETHER

== Finalists and exhibitions ==
The award process includes an exhibition of the shortlisted works. In 2019, the shortlisted works were shown in the Great Hall of the Latvian National Museum of Art before the winner was announced. The 2023 finalists were announced after an expert working group evaluated exhibitions, events and projects from the 2021–2022 period. The 2025 finalists included artists and artist groups working in painting, installation, sculpture, photography and other forms of visual art.

In 2021, eight artists or artist groups reached the final stage, including Skuja Braden, Valdis Celms, Krista and Reinis Dzudzilo, Kaspars Groševs, Ieva Kraule-Kūna and Elīna Vītola, Rasa and Raitis Šmits, Aija Zariņa, and Amanda Ziemele. In 2025, the shortlist included Indriķis Ģelzis, Romāns Korovins, Ieva Kraule-Kūna, Inga Meldere and Luīze Nežberte, Luīze Rukšāne, Krišs Salmanis, Elza Sīle and Paula Zvane.

== Lifetime contribution award ==
The lifetime contribution award was introduced in 2019. Džemma Skulme was the first recipient, and the award carried a separate monetary prize of €10,000. Later recipients included Maija Tabaka in 2021 and Edīte Pauls-Vīgnere in 2023.

== See also ==
- Latvian art
- Latvian National Museum of Art
