= Katrīna Neiburga =

Latvian contemporary artist working (born 1978)

- Born: 10 February 1978 (age 48); Riga, Latvia
- Known for: video artist
- Spouse: Andris Eglitis

Katrīna Neiburga (born 10 February 1978 in Riga) is a Latvian contemporary artist working mainly with video and set design. She has received the prestigious Latvian visual art award, the Purvitis Prize. In 2015 she collaborated with Andris Eglitis at the 56th Venice Biennale with a multimedia art installation, "Armpit." And in 2016 participated in the Coachella Valley Music and Arts Festival. According to the Desert Sun, Neiburga is one of the most recognized video artists in Latvia.
