= St. Peter's Church, Riga =

St. Peter's Church
- The Parish Church of Saint Peter
- Svētā Pētera baznīca
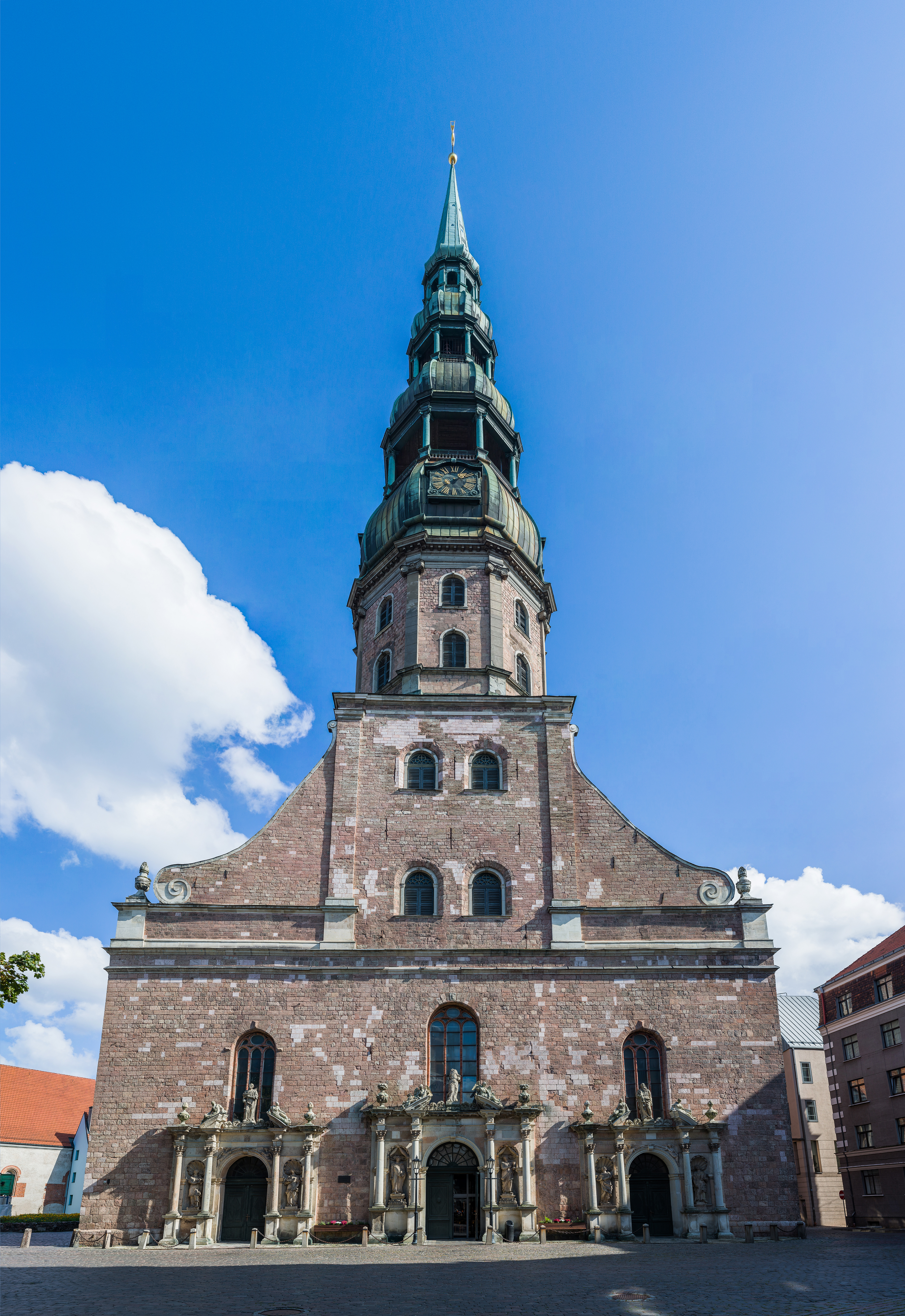

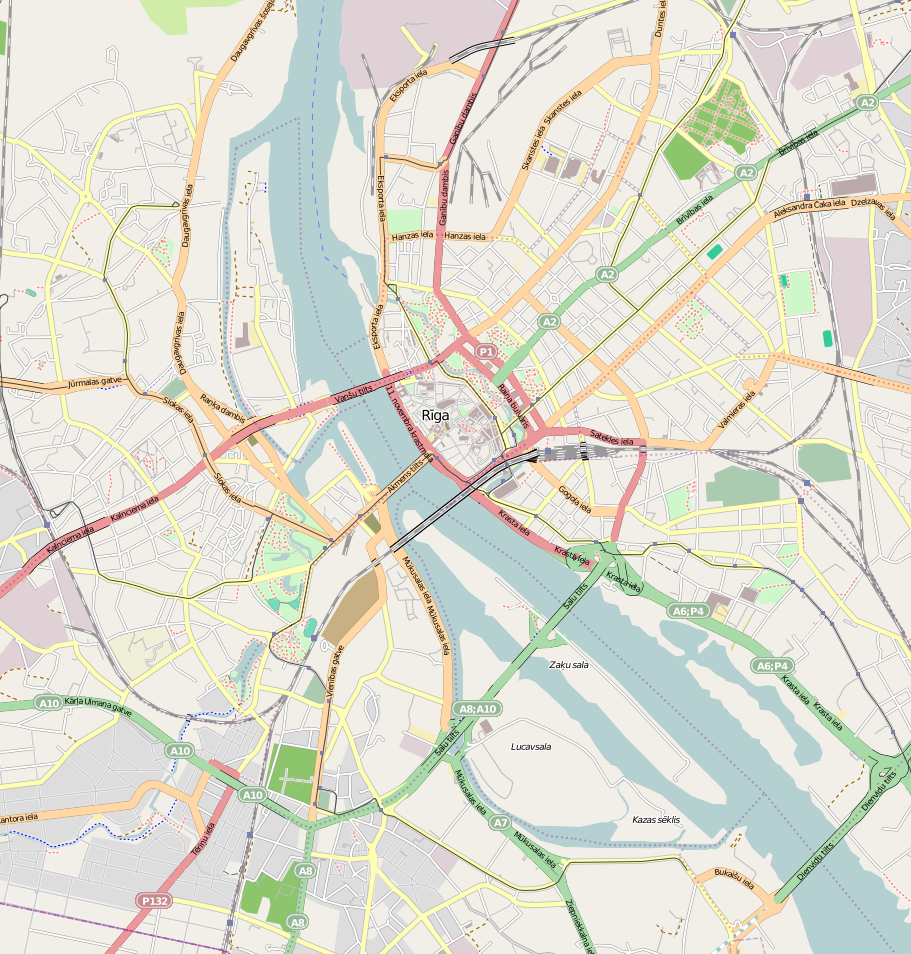
- Location within Riga
- 56°56′51″N 24°6′34″E
- Location: Old Riga, Riga
- Country: Latvia
- Denomination: Lutheran
- Previous denomination: Roman Catholic
- Website: Website of the Church

History
- Status: Parish church
- Founded: 13th century
- Founder: Albert of Riga
- Dedication: Saint Peter

Architecture
- Functional status: Active
- Style: Gothic
- Years built: 1209; 1419; 1470 (rebuilt as basilica with 3 aisles and vaulted ceilings); 1690; 1721; 1954 (restored after WW2)

Specifications
- Length: 78.8 m (258 ft 6 in)
- Width: 34.9 m (114 ft 6 in)
- Height: 30 m (98 ft 5 in)

Administration
- Archdiocese: Riga

Clergy
- Archbishop: Jānis Vanags
- Pastor: Atis Vaickovskis

St. Peter's Church (Latvian: Svētā Pētera evaņģēliski luteriskā baznīca, German: St. Petrikirche) is a Lutheran church in Riga, the capital of Latvia, dedicated to Saint Peter. It is a parish church of the Evangelical Lutheran Church of Latvia.

== History ==
First mention of the St. Peter's Church is in records dating to 1209. The church was of masonry construction and therefore undamaged by a city fire in Riga that year. The history of the church can be divided into three distinct periods: two associated with Gothic and Romanesque building styles and the third with the early Baroque period. The middle section of the church was built during the 13th century, which encompasses the first period. The only remnants of this period are located in the outer nave walls and on the inside of a few pillars in the nave, around which larger pillars were later built.

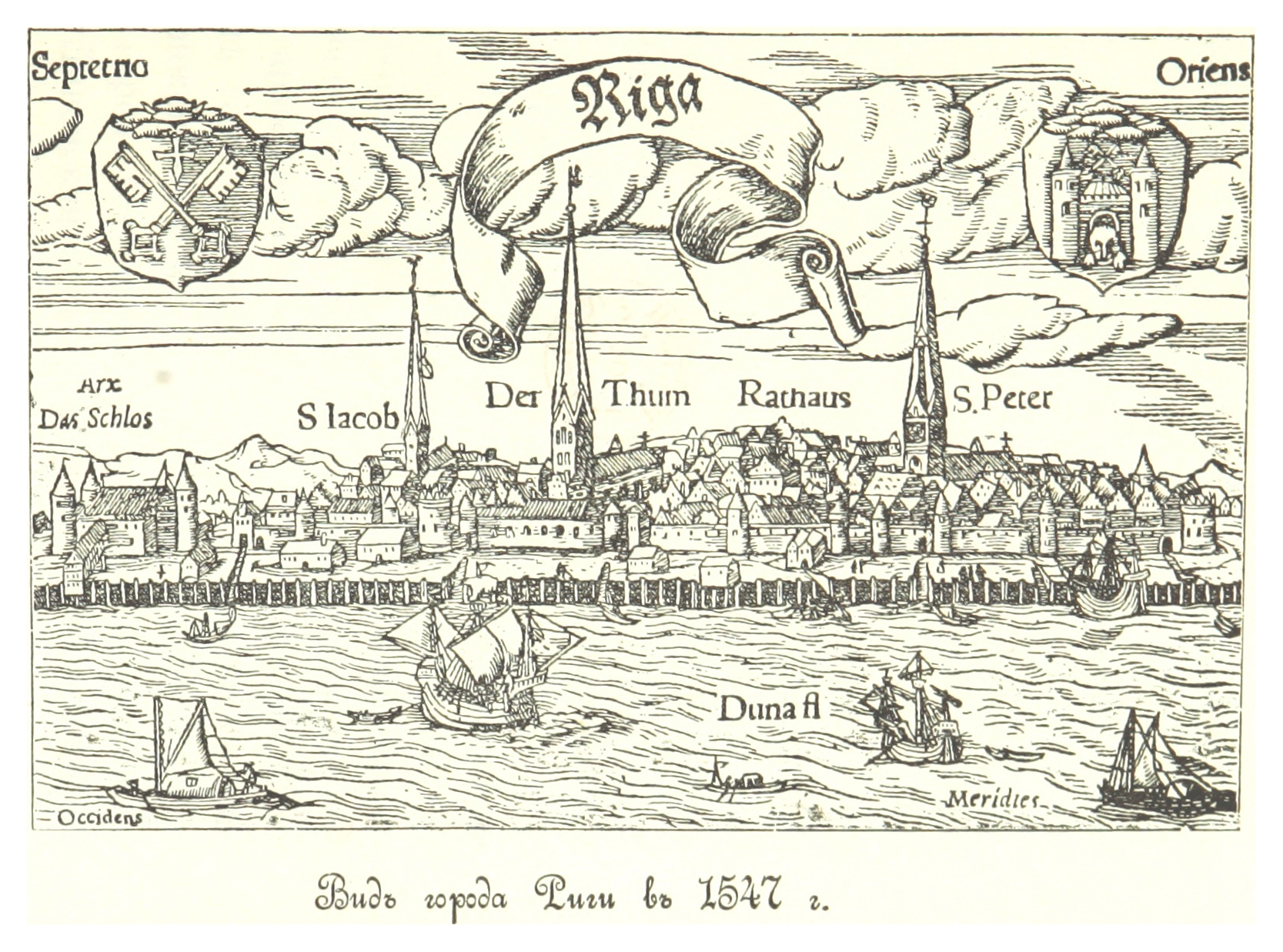
Riga in 1547 - The three church towers: St. James’s Church; Riga Cathedral; St. Peter's Church

=== Second period of construction ===
The second period dates to 1408–09, when master builder Johannes Rumeschottel from Rostock supervised the construction of the sanctuary, based on the St. Mary's Church in Rostock. The sanctuary was almost finished by 1409, but due to the Polish–Lithuanian–Teutonic War it was completed and dedicated only in 1419. Other construction work was interrupted by the plague in 1420 and resumed in the 1430s. The 13th-century church was reconstructed in 1456–66 to conform to the newly built sanctuary. Both constructions were joined in the 1470s, thereby creating a mighty basilica with three aisles and ornate vaulted ceilings. The old bell tower was replaced in 1456, and a bell was hung in the new tower in 1477. A 136 metres (446 ft) octagonal steeple was added to the tower in 1491, which, along with the church's front facade, dominated the silhouette of Riga. The tower collapsed 11 March 1666, destroying a neighboring building and burying eight people in the rubble. The cornerstone for a new tower was laid 29 June 1667.

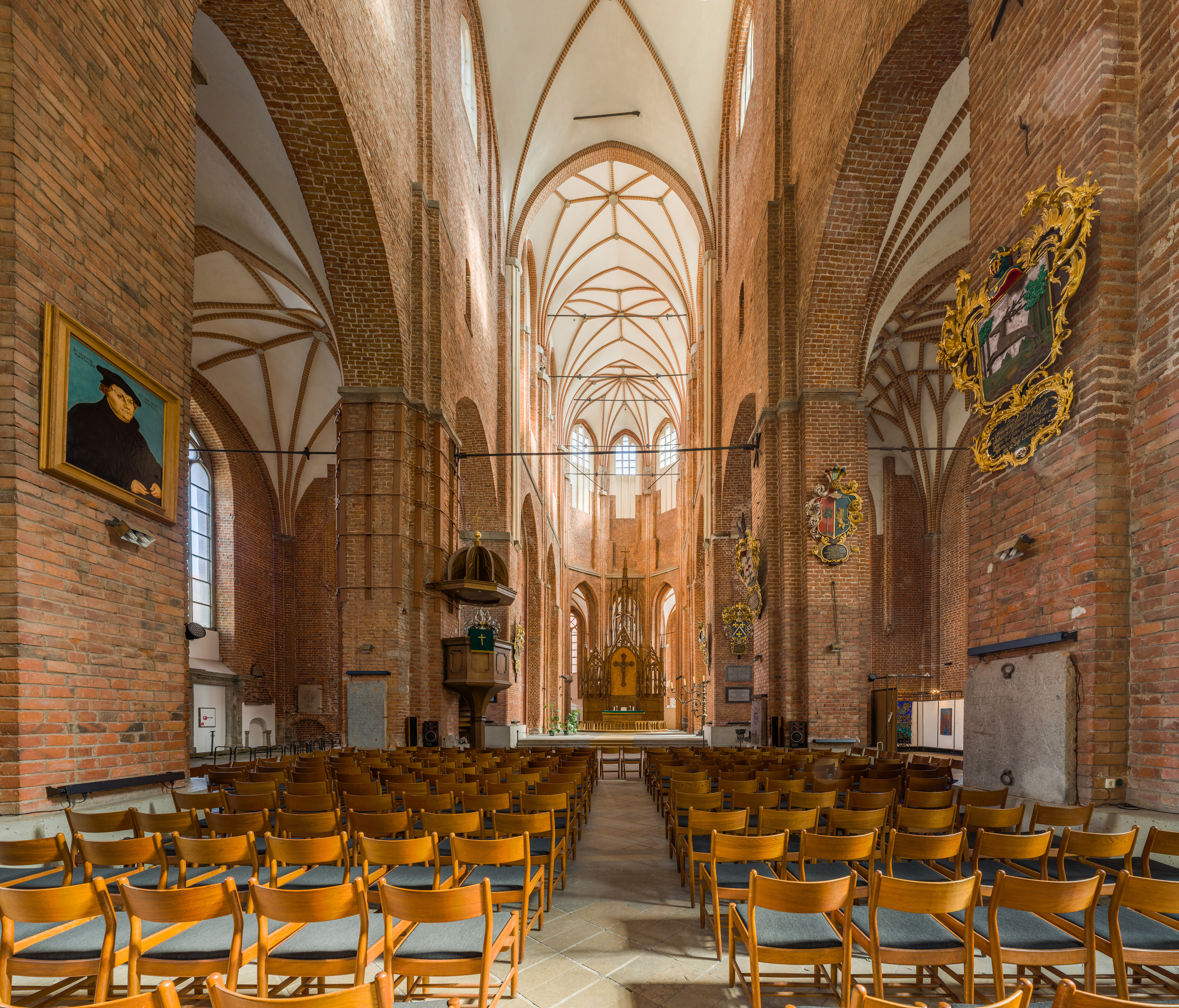
The nave

=== Third period of construction ===
The third period of construction dates to 1671–90, with the construction of the western facade and the new tower. The roof, vaulted ceilings and furnishings were also renovated during this time. Jacob Josten, the Dutch-born master builder of Riga, designed the tower and supervised its construction, which was begun April 1671 by the master mason Heinrich Henicke. Josten was replaced in 1675 by Rupert Bindenschu (1645–1698), the next master builder of Riga. The tower was completed in 1677, but it, along with the church interior, were destroyed already 21 May 1677, during a citywide fire. Bindenshu supervised the subsequent repairs in 1677–79: vaulted wooden ceilings replaced the former masonry vaulted ceilings, and the roof, windows, interior and furnishings were replaced or renovated. First service in the renovated church took place 14 September 1679. Renovation of the tower began 1686 and was designed by the city engineer Friedrich S. von Dahlen. The city council did not approve of the half-finished steeple, and so it was torn down in 1688. A new 148 metres (486 ft) copper-roofed steeple, designed by Bindenshu, was then built. A sphere and rooster were set atop the steeple 10 May 1690. This tower was the tallest wooden construction in Europe at the time. The western facade of the church was also altered in the later 17th century. The brick construction was covered with reddish limestone from Salaspils and Koknese, and the facade was decorated with volutes, pilasters, cornices, vases and borders made of Gotland stone. In 1692 the Riga City Council approved a design by Bindenshu and the mason Andreas Peterman for three identical portals. The merchant Klaus Mistett financed the portals, which were built by H. Henneken, Johann Daniel Schauss, Johann Gerwin and several other sculptors. The portals were decorated with Baroque style limestone sculptures. In 1694 L. Martini installed a new tower clock with a glockenspiel from Amsterdam.

=== First reconstruction ===
The newly renovated church served for a mere 29 years, for lightning struck and set fire to the tower and church 10 May 1721. Only the church and tower walls remained standing after the fire. Reconstruction of the church began immediately under the direction of the master carpenter Tom Bochum and master mason Kristofer Meinert. By 1723 the building already had a temporary roof. Johann Heinrich Wilbern took over supervision of the project in 1740, and under his direction a new 120.7 metres (396 ft) steeple was built in 1746. The steeple was covered with copper-plate and the rooster was gilded in 1746–47. Christoph Haberland designed a new marble pulpit for the church, which was built in Italy in 1793. In 1794 Haberland renovated the wooden vaulted ceilings in the central sections of the nave. The interior walls were plastered and the lower sections of the pillars were covered with oak panels in 1885 under the direction of architect Reinhold Georg Schmaeling (1840–1917).

=== Second reconstruction ===
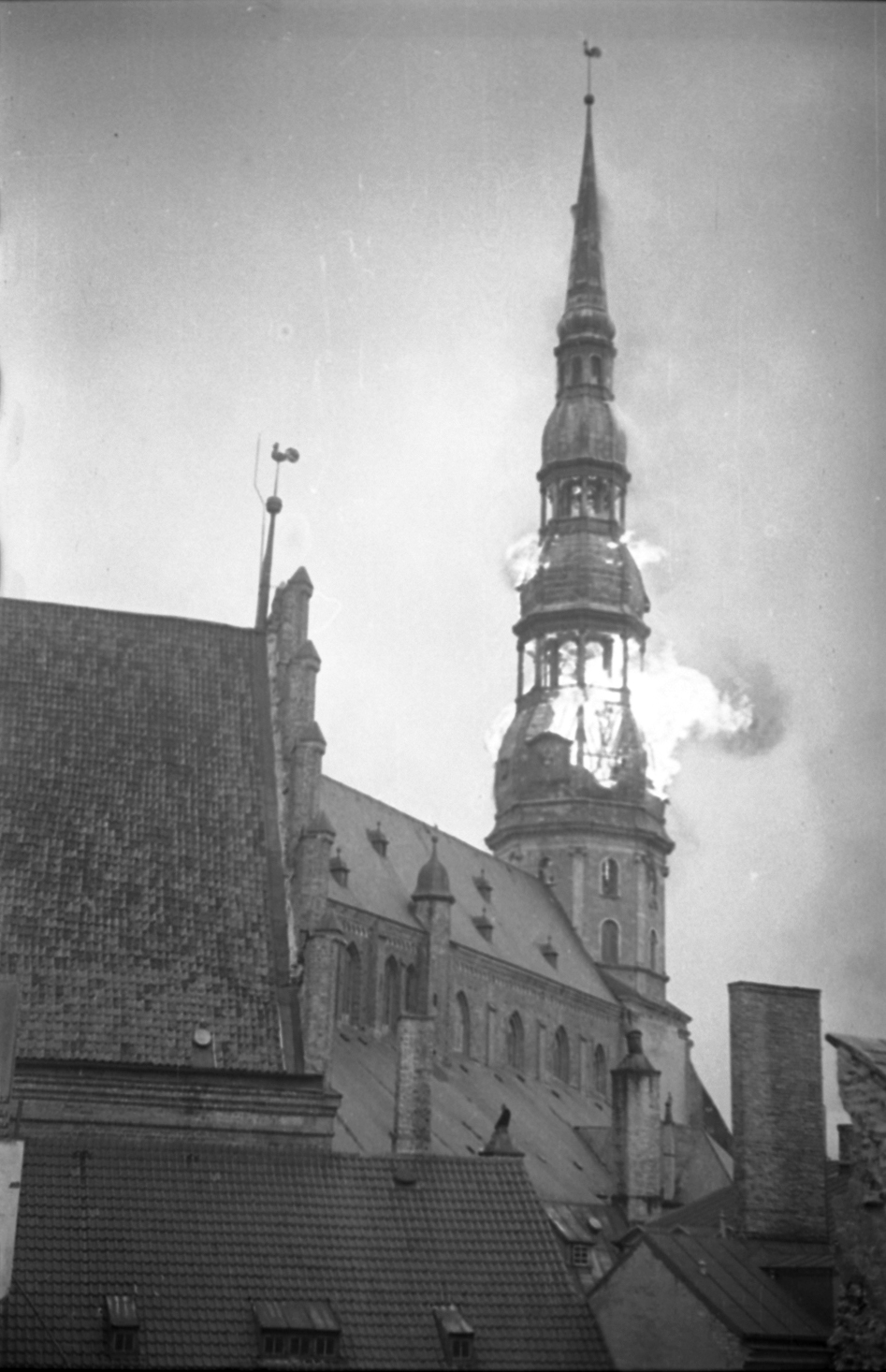
Burning of St. Peter's Church (1941)

Artillery fire destroyed the church on 29 June 1941. Conservation and restoration began 1954 with research by architect Pēteris Saulītis. The work was carried out from 1967 to 1983 under the direction of Saulītis and architect Gunārs Zirnis. Renovation began with the metal tower frame. A rooster – a precise reproduction of the previous rooster and the seventh rooster in all – was placed atop the steeple 21 August 1970. The renovated tower clock began to show time in July 1975. According to tradition, it has only an hour hand. The bell music began in 1976; it plays the Latvian folk melody "Rīga dimd" five times a day and bells ring at the top of every hour. The tower has an elevator installed that allows visitors a view of Riga from a height of 72 metres (236 ft). Renovation of the interior of the church ended in 1984. The Polish company "PKZ" restored the main facade and portals in 1987–91. The St. Peter's Latvian Lutheran congregation resumed services in the church 1991, and the church was returned to the ownership of the Evangelical Lutheran Church of Latvia on 4 April 2006.

During World War II, the church lost an important object of cultural heritage - an impressive bronze candelabrum made in 1596 - which was taken to the town of Włocławek by Germans from Riga, resettled during "Heim ins Reich" action to annexed Polish territories. The 310 cm high and 378 cm wide candelabrum, previously called a standing lantern, was ordered by the City Council of Riga from the metal founder Hans Meyer's Riga foundry. After the war, it was displayed in Włocławek's Basilica Cathedral of the St. Mary of Assumption. On 1 March 2012 this piece of the Late Renaissance art returned to its ancient home, as a result of an agreement on the repatriation of cultural properties. The statue of the rooster on the top of the church weighs 158 kg and 140 grams of gold were used to gold plate the statue.

== Gallery ==
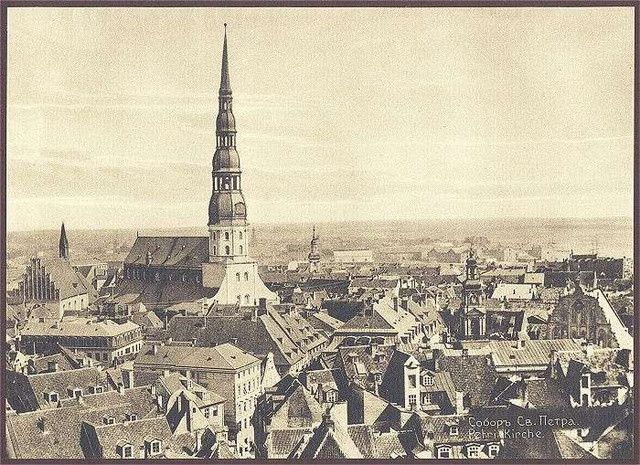
St. Peter's Church in 19th century

The shape of St. Peter's Church after it burned down during World War II

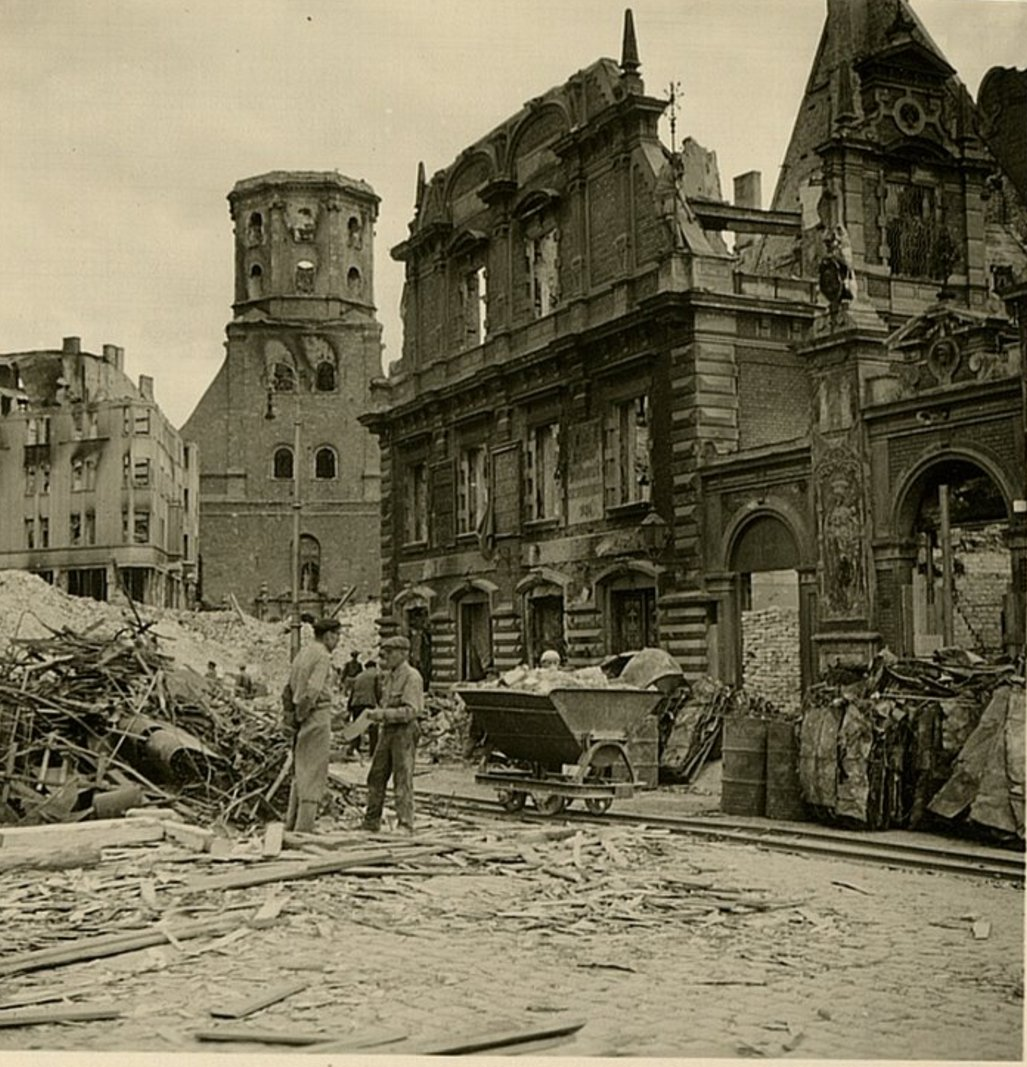
Ruins of St. Peter's Church and House of the Blackheads

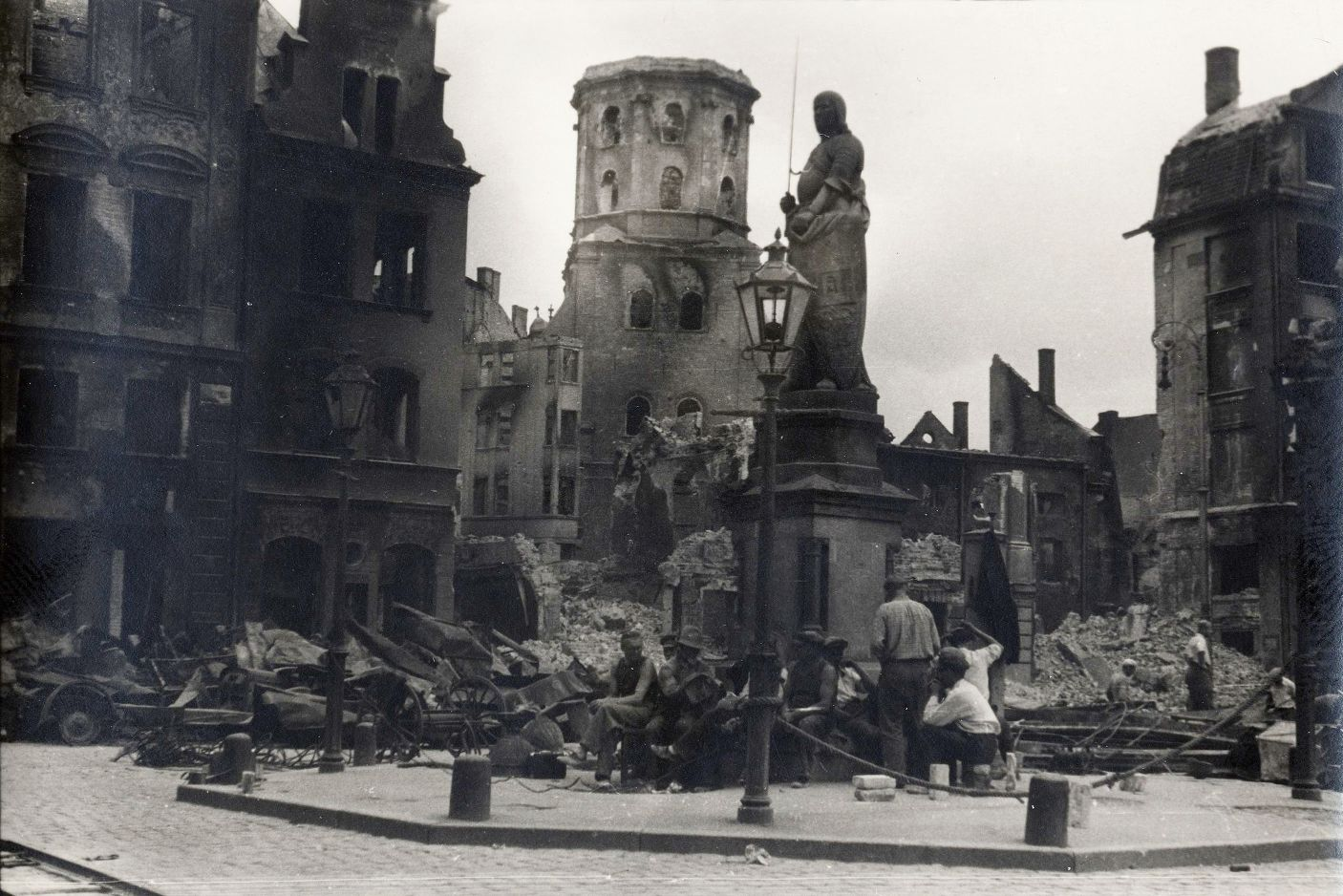
Church after bombing and fire

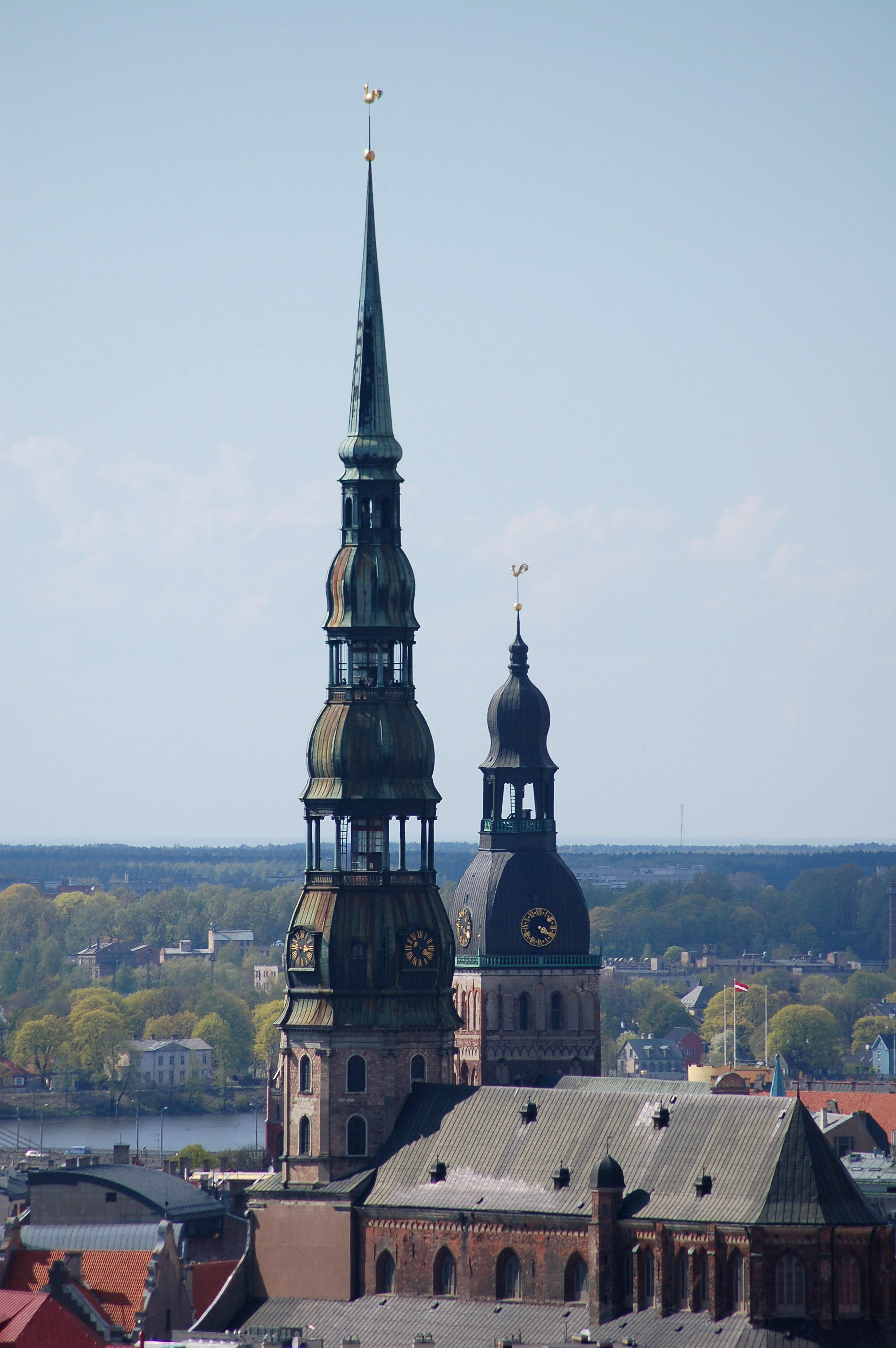
St. Peter's Church, with the tower of the cathedral church behind

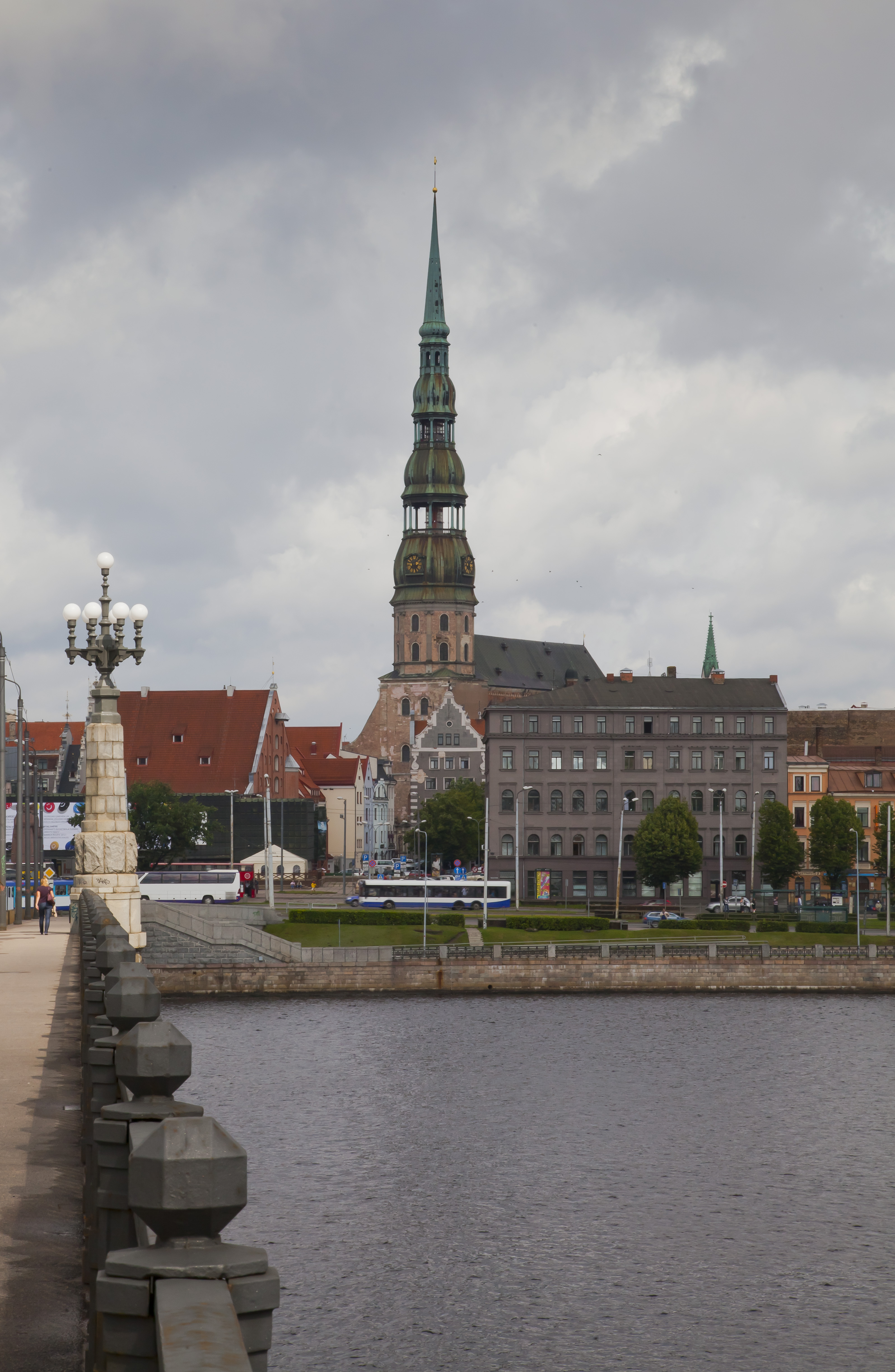
St. Peter's Church as seen from Daugava River

=== Panorama ===
360 degrees panorama view as seen from St. Peter's church, Riga, Latvia

== Sources ==
- Mašnovskis, Vitolds (2007). Latvijas luterāņu baznīcas : Vēsture, arhitektūra, māksla un memoriālā kultūra : 3. sējums M-Sal – The Lutheran Churches of Latvia : An encyclopedia in four volumes (in Latvian and English). Riga: DUE. ISBN 978-9984-9948-4-0. OCLC 229902564.
- Banga, Vita; Marina Levina; et al. (2007). Rīgas dievnami: Arhitektūra un māksla. Riga's Churches. Architecture and Art (in Latvian, German, English, and Russian). Riga: Zinātne, Apgads Mantojums. ISBN 978-9984-823-00-3. OCLC 217266501.
