= Andra Neiburga =

Latvian writer and translator (1957–2019)

Andra Neiburga (16 January 1957 – 2 March 2019) was a Latvian writer and translator who was best known for her short stories.

== Biography ==
Andra Neiburga was born on 16 January 1957 in Riga. She studied at Riga Secondary School No. 5 (1964–1973), graduated from Riga School of Applied Arts in 1977, and from the Department of Industrial Art at the Latvian Academy of Arts in 1986. From 1986, she designed the magazine "Avots", and in the early 1990s Neiburga was an artist of the magazine "Flag".

Neiburga's first literary publication was the story "The Shining Sun" in 1985. Later, along with other early Neiburgian stories, it was included in the collection "Birds and Birds in Cages" (1988), which came out in 20,000 copies and made Neiburga one of the main novel writers, the book was widely discussed in reviews and articles. From 1987 to 1989 Neiburga was the head of the Riga New Literature Association. She was also a member of the Writers' Union since 1989.

The most important translation by Neiburga is Mikhail Bulgakov's long story "Heart of the Dog", which was published in the magazine "Avots" in 1988. In 2008, this translation was dramatized and staged at the Daile Theater (director Laura Groza).

In 1991, the children's book "The Story of Till and the Dog Man" came out, a strange story about the life of the simple people of the outskirts of Riga. In 1993, the work received the Pastariņš Prize. In 1996, the Daile Theater staged a diploma work for actors of the Latvian Academy of Culture – a performance for children "Tille and a dog husband" (directed by Arnolds Liniņš and Aina Matīsa). A Latvian Radio production was recorded in 2002, and in 2002, the screening of the story was filmed in a video, followed by a re-publication of the book, supplied by Zvaigzne ABC. In 2003, the work received the AKKA / LAA Copyright Infinity Award for Versatile Use of the Work.

In 1993, Neiburga turned to the management of family houses. In the 90s and 21st century she published columns in the newspaper "Diena" at the beginning. She also participated in the production of theater performances: adapted A. Schnitzler's text for "Rondo" for the New Riga Theater (2000, directed by Baņuta Rubess), translated Oscar Wilde's "Ideal Man" (2002, Liepāja Theater, directed by B. Rubess), and dramatized S. Oksanen's novel "Purge" for the New Riga Theater Show "Musha" (2012, directed by Inese Mičule).

In 2004, the second collection of stories "Stum, stum" came out, which received the annual "Diena" cultural award and was nominated for the Literature Year Award. In 2012, five of the stories of the collection (title story, "El ninjo", "Place of It", "My Fictional Life" and "Such Evenings") were used in the New Riga Theater in the performance "Stum, stum." In early 2014, the collection "Stum, stum" was recognized as one of the 100 Latvian readers' favorite books on TV show "Great Reading", in September it was discovered that the novel was ranked 94th in the vote of readers.

In 2017, the collection "Stum, stum" was republished to celebrate the writer's jubilee and on 27 January in Riga an honorary conference "Andra Neiburga: language, gender, narration, picture" was held.

Her daughter is artist Katrina Neiburga and her son is artist Aleksandrs Breže.
