= Riga Christmas Market =

Christmas market in Riga, Latvia

Market, December 2023

The Riga Christmas Market (Latvian: Rīgas Ziemassvētku tirdziņš), is a Christmas market held every year in Riga, Latvia. Taking place from late November to early January in Dome Square beside the Riga Cathedral, it has become an annual tradition of the city. It begins during the Advent season and extends through New Year's celebrations.

== History ==
Riga's history of Christmas celebrations goes back to the Middle Ages, beginning with a decorated Christmas tree as long ago as 1510, when members of the local merchants' guild Brotherhood of Blackheads adorned a tree with artificial roses, danced around it in the marketplace, and then set it ablaze, following a practice begun in Tallinn. The modern Christmas market tradition in Riga was revitalized in 2000. Since then the Riga Christmas Market has been recognised as one of the most authentic Christmas destinations in Europe and as one of Europe's most affordable Christmas markets.

== Gallery ==
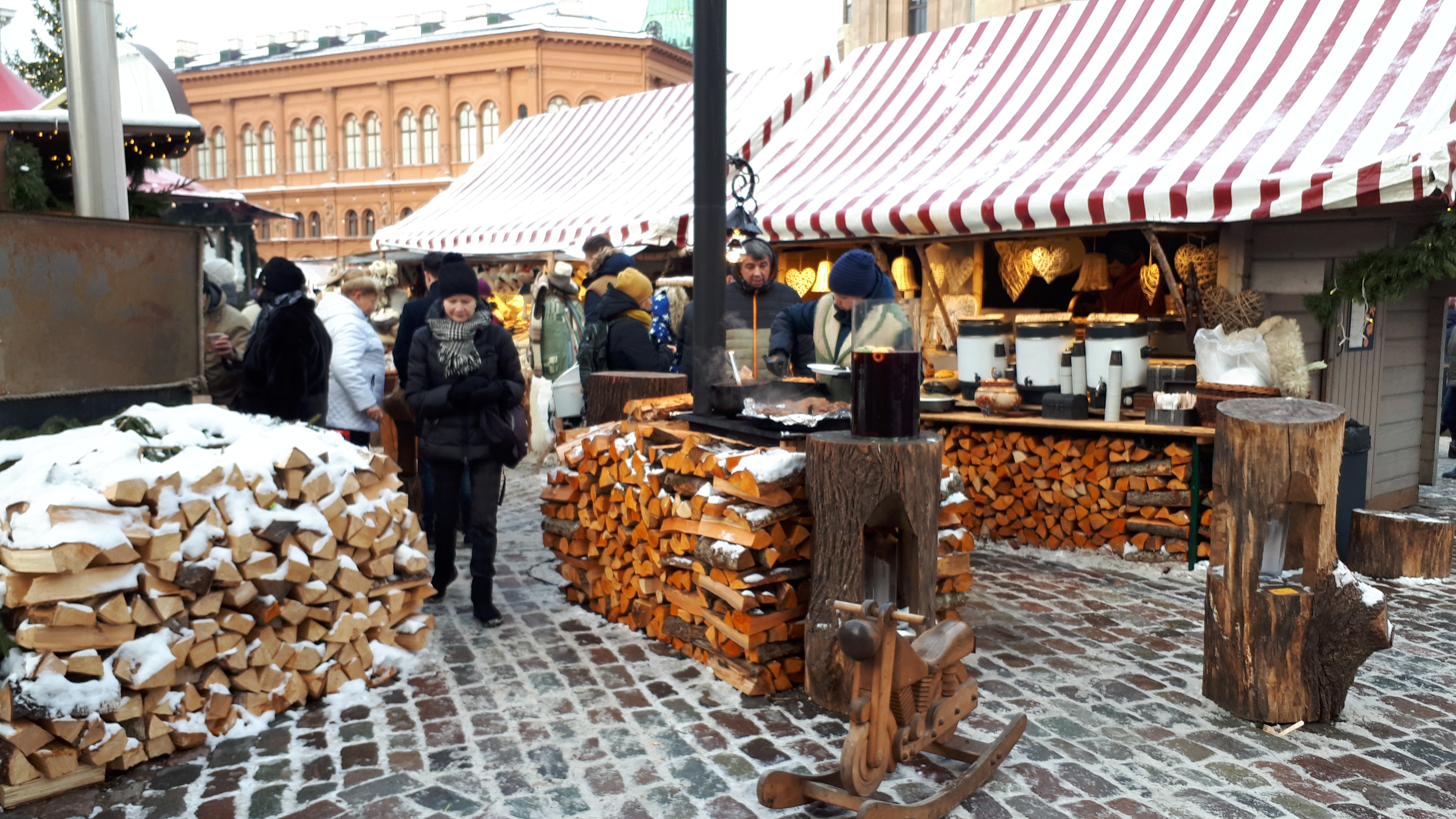
Market in 2018

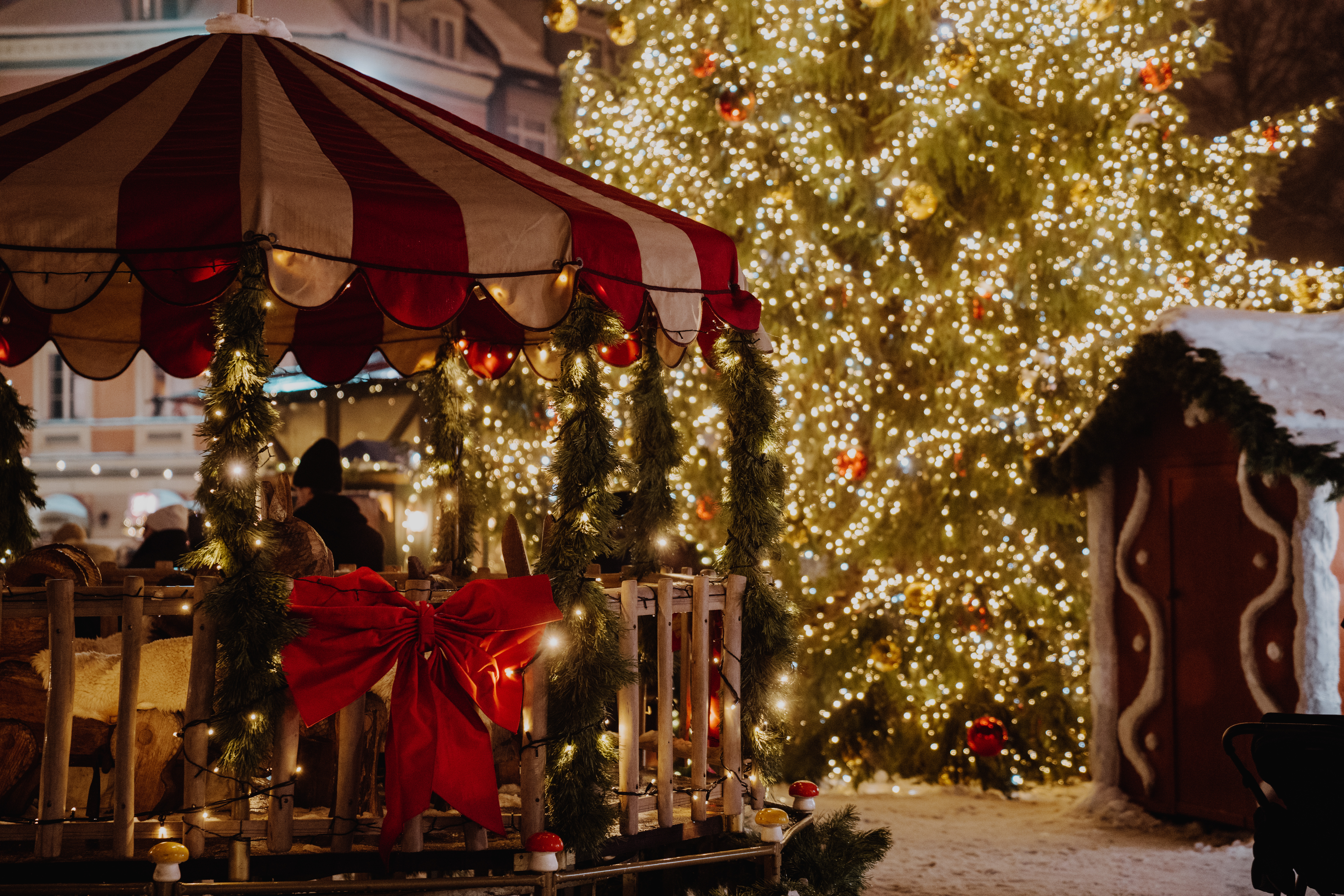
Riga Christmas market in 2022

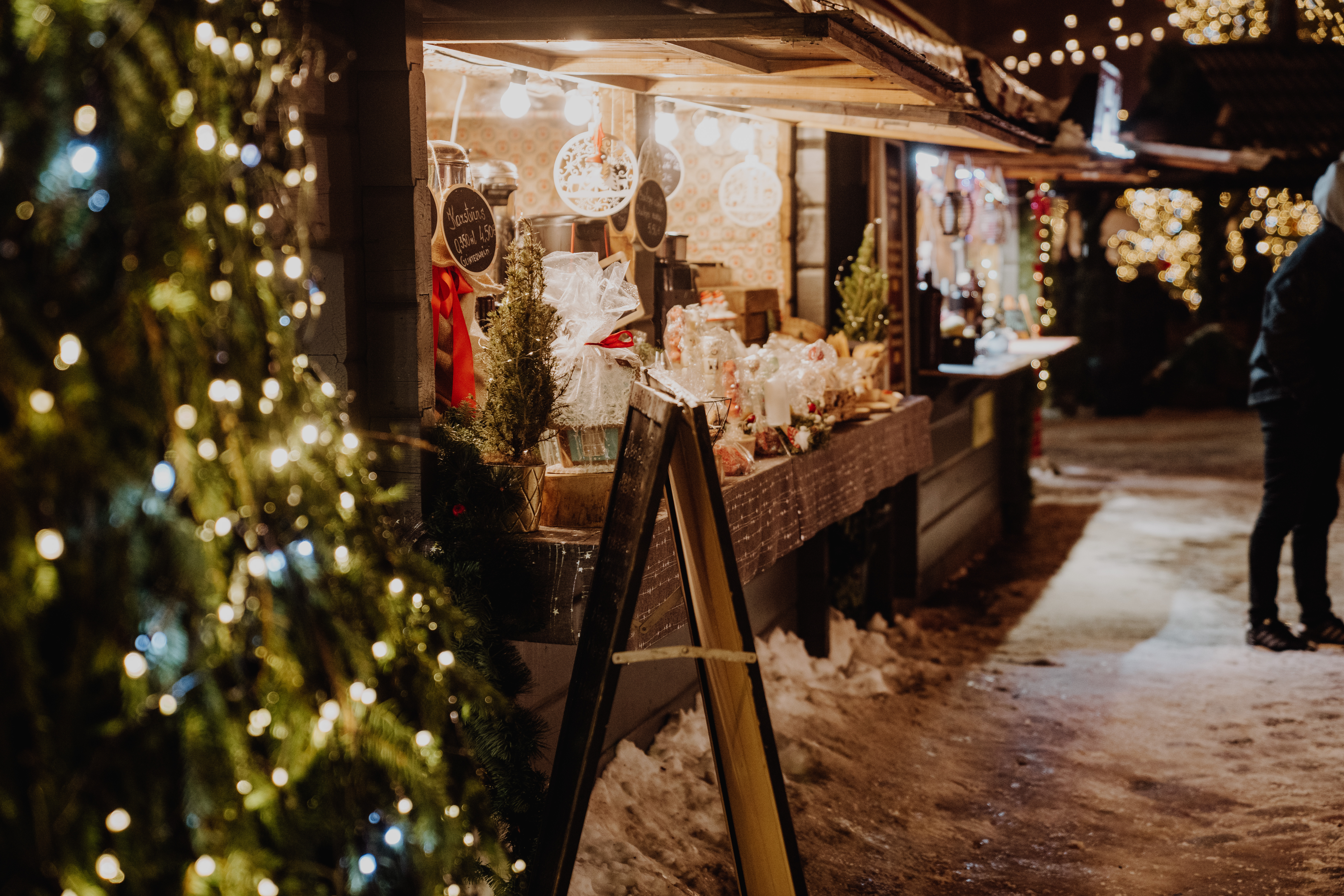
Stalls at the Riga Christmas market

== See also ==
- List of Christmas markets
