= Reinhold Schmaeling =

Baltic German architect (1840–1917)

Reinhold Georg Schmaeling
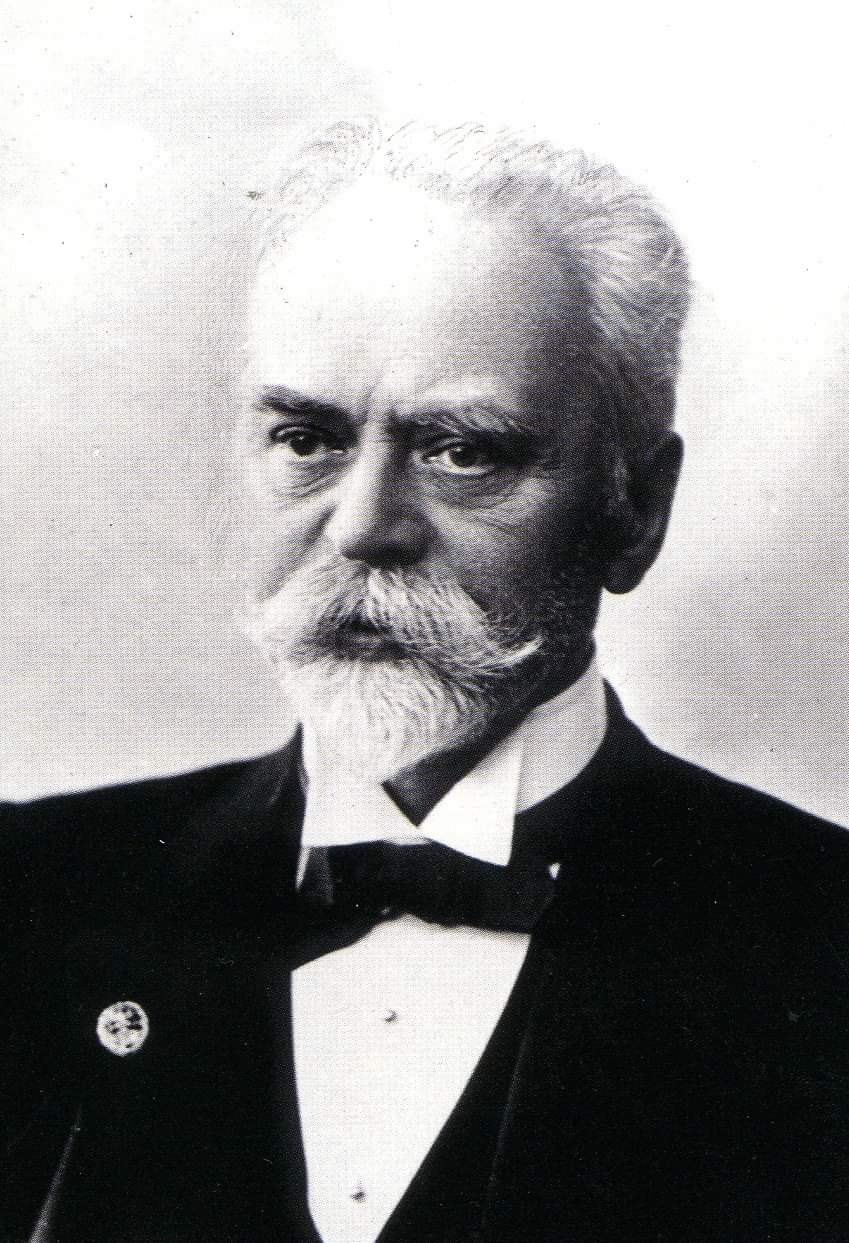
- Born: 14 November 1840; Riga, Governorate of Livonia, Russian Empire
- Died: 17 October 1917 (aged 76); Riga, Governorate of Livonia Russian Empire
- Education: St Petersburg Academy of Arts (1868)
- Occupation: Architect
- Spouse: Marie Eveline von Tiesenhausen
- Children: 2
- Practice: Eclecticism, Art Nouveau
- Buildings: Older buildings of Pauls Stradiņš Clinical University Hospital, and many others

Reinhold Georg Schmaeling (German: Reinhold Georg Schmaeling, 1840–1917) was a Baltic German architect of the city of Riga during years 1879 to 1915.

Schmaeling is notable in the history of Riga for his unique style of red brick architecture. From his architectural drawings, almost 100 buildings have been built in Riga, including 25 schools, 3 hospitals, 5 fire departments, 2 markets, night shelters, kindergartens, administrative buildings, cultural institutions, sports and religious buildings, barracks and residential buildings, which are integral to today's architectural environment of Riga.

Schmaeling is one of the architects included in the Latvian cultural canon.

== Biography ==
Reinhold Georg Schmaeling was born in 1840 in Riga, Governorate of Livonia in a Baltic German family. He received his first education in a private primary school in Riga. In 1854, at age 14, Schmaeling went to Saint Petersburg to study mechanical engineering at the Institute of Technology, but had to leave because of his health. He then attended Larin Gymnasium (Russian: Ларинская гимназия) and, since 1856, a drawing class at the Saint Petersburg Academy of Arts, where he became more and more interested in the subject, and in 1858 he entered the Department of Architecture of the Academy of Arts.

From 1860 to 1862, in addition to his studies, Schmaeling worked for the architect and professor Ludwig Bohnstedt, who is known as the author of many public buildings in Finland, Russia, Germany and elsewhere, including the Riga National Theater (now Latvian National Opera).

Later, he received a travel grant 'pension' from his faculty, which made possible for their students to improve their professional skills abroad for four years. Subsequently, in 1869, when Schmaeling went to study in Germany, he married Marie Eveline von Tiesenhausen and they had a son Willy, who died prematurely of diphtheria. Then Schmaeling spent the next three years with his family in Italy.

Since 1873, Schmaeling had been working in Saint Petersburg, then for a while in Crimea, but since 1877 - again in Saint Petersburg, in the Department of Apanage. During this time, Schmaeling also led the arrangement of the Russian pavilion at the 1873 Vienna World's Fair. In 1874, a son, Woldemar, was born into the Schmaeling family, and in 1877, son Alexander.

In 1879, Schmaeling accepted an invitation to become an architect of the city of Riga, becoming a successor of architect Johann Daniel Felsko. Returning to his hometown, he dedicated most of his creative life for it - 36 years. At the beginning of the 20th century, when most of the buildings designed by Schmaeling were built, several other architects also worked in his office - Leopold Riemer, Rudolph Tode, Boris von Bock, Nikolai Nord and Gottfriedt Croon, who are not the only co-authors of Schmaeling's work.

In 1915, Schmaeling retired and two years later, in 1917 he died and was buried in the Great Cemetery of Riga.

Alexander (1877-1961), the son of Reinhold Schmaeling, was also a well-known Art Nouveau architect in Riga. Alexander's grandson Anthony Zbigniew was also an architect who lived in the Istrian peninsula in Croatia.

== Architectural works ==
Few of the most notable include:

- Āgenskalns Market (1911)
- Vidzeme Market (1902)
- Pumping station at Eksporta iela 2b (1908)
- Riga city 1st hospital
- Pauls Stradiņš Clinical University Hospital (formerly Riga 2nd hospital) at Pilsoņu iela 13 (1908–1915)
- Residential buildings
  - Miera iela 5 (1912)
  - Matīsa iela 9 (1902)
  - Ģertrūdes iela 38 (1907)

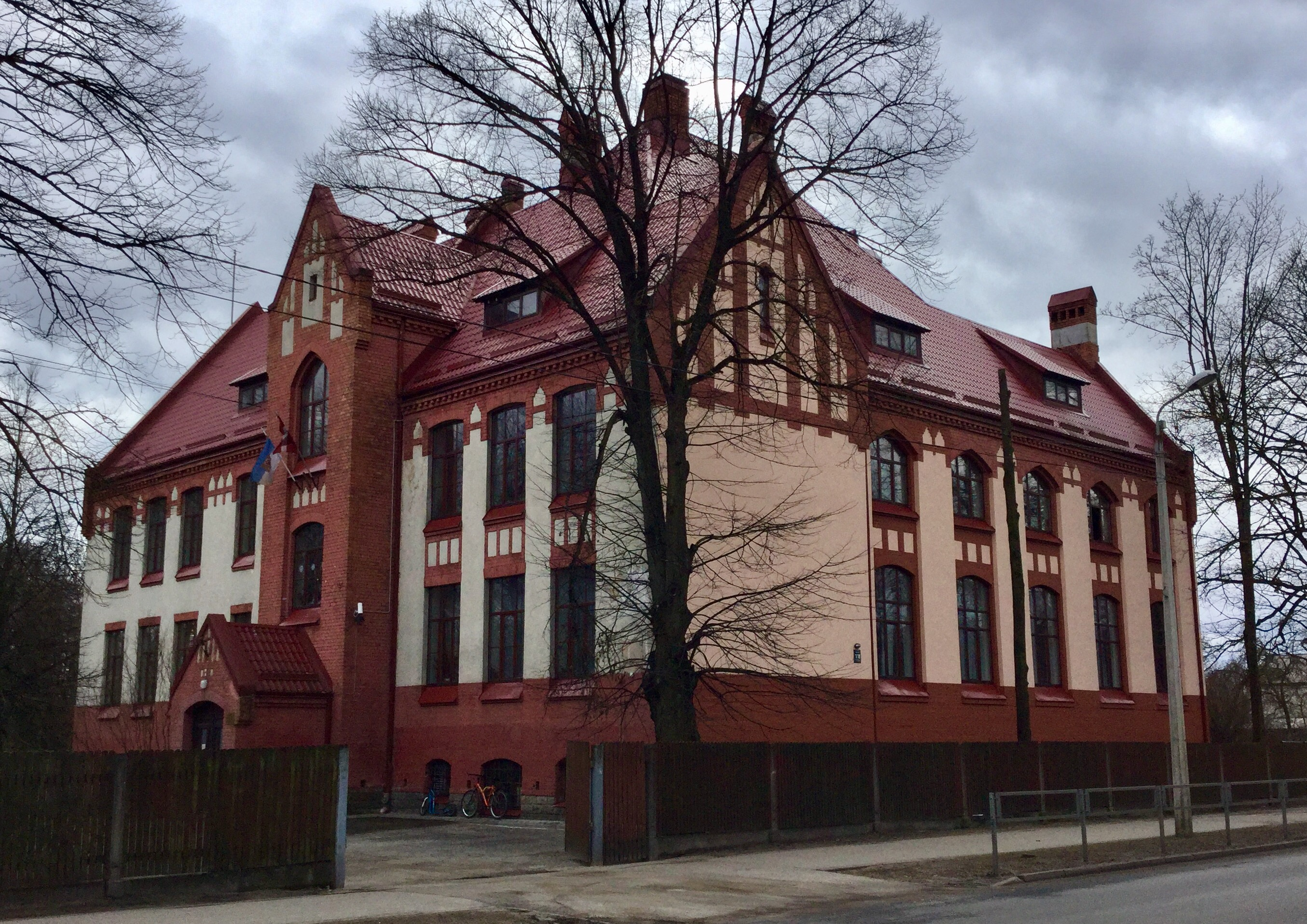
School built in 1912, located in Kalnciema iela 118

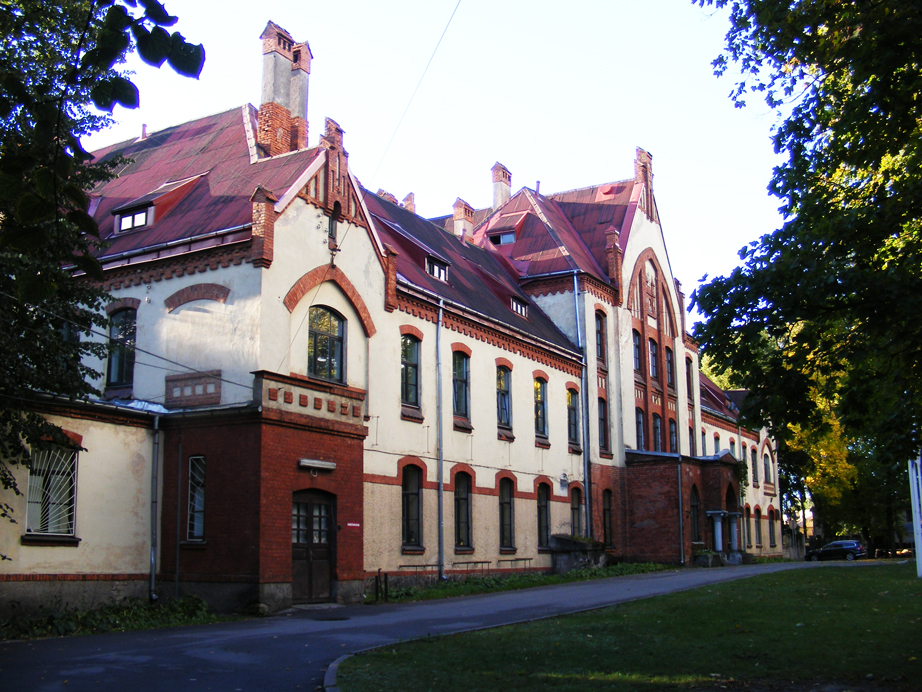
Old main building of Pauls Stradiņš Clinical University Hospital

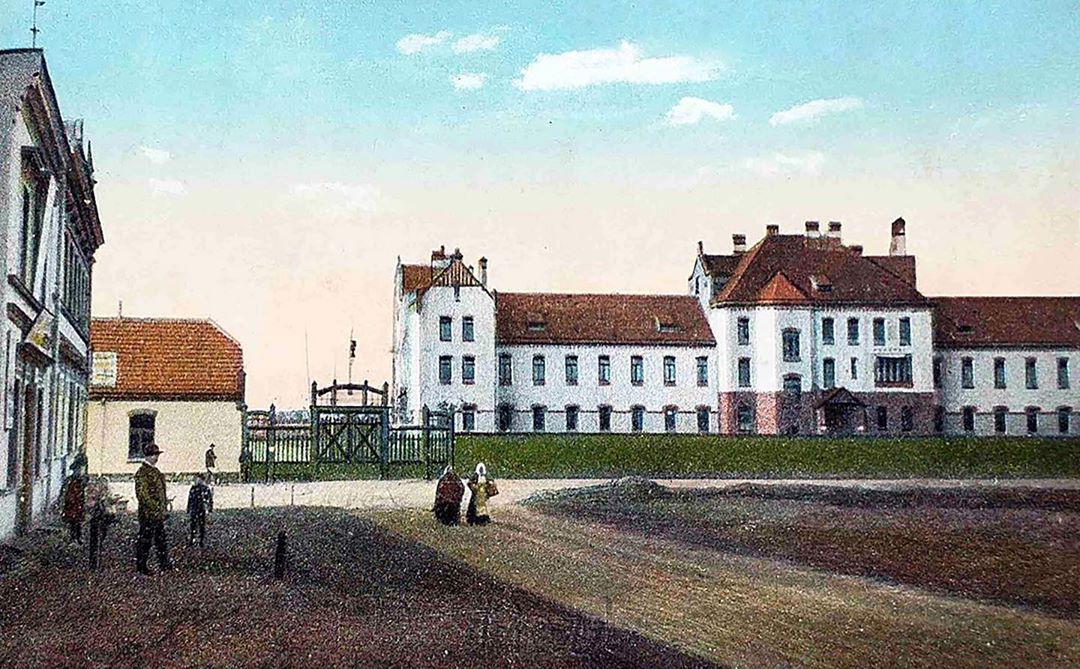
Riga 2nd hospital (1910)

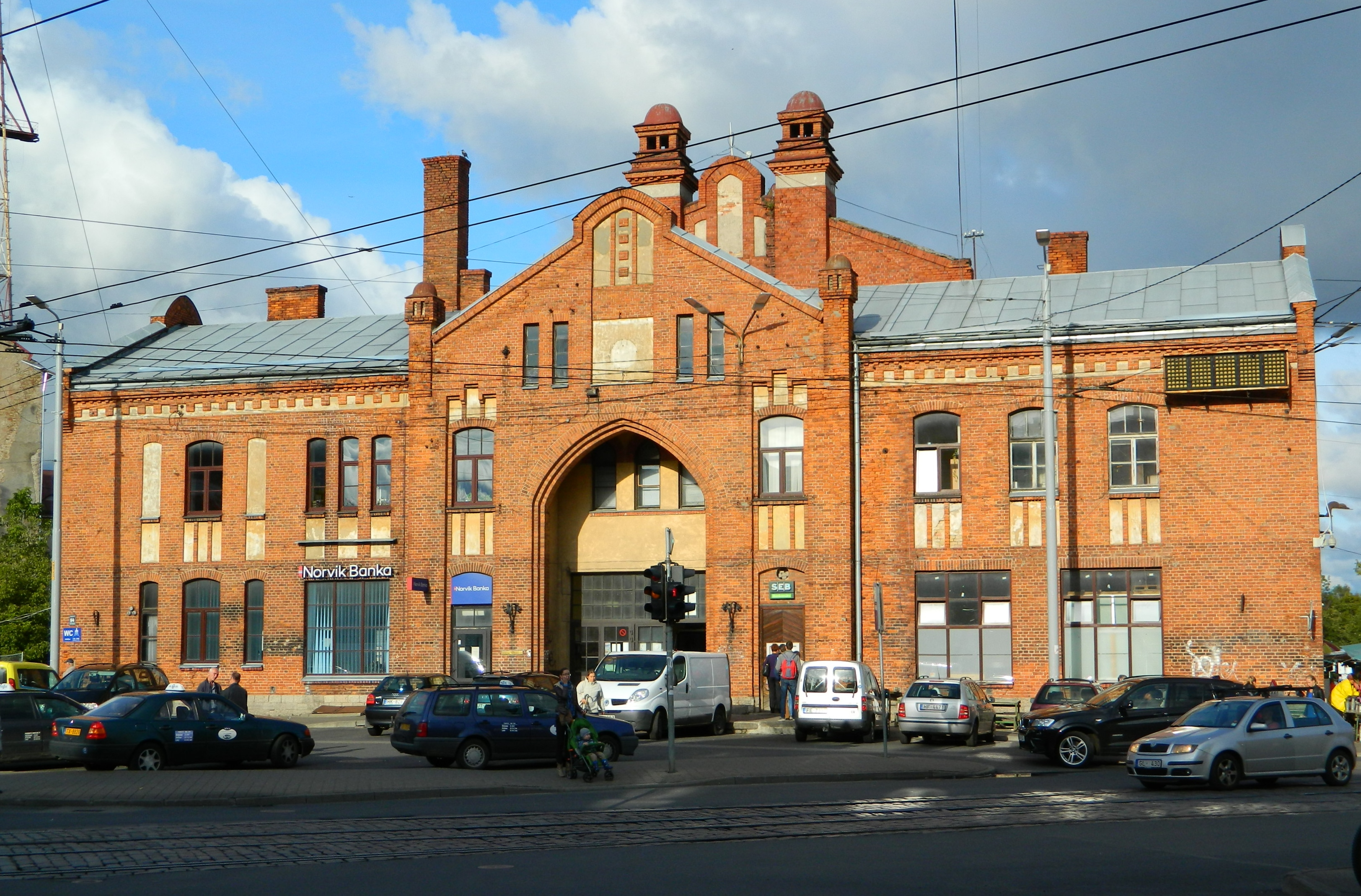
Agenskalns market (1911)

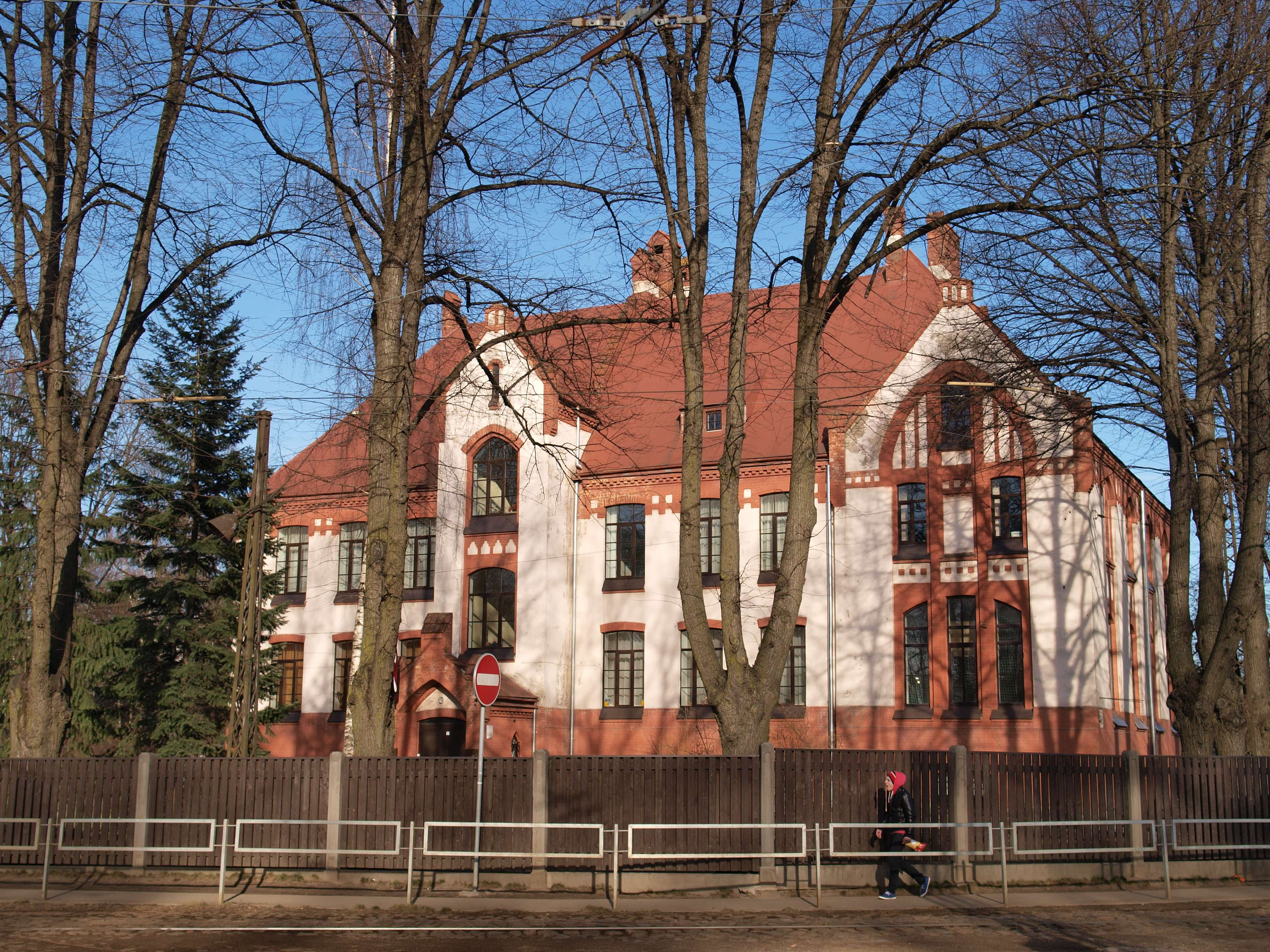
School building at Telts street 2a, Riga, Latvia

=== List of buildings ===
| Address | Construction function | Year of construction |
|---|---|---|
| Abrenes street 3 | City Real Estate Administration | Around 1902 |
| Akmeņu street 17 | Fire station | 1886 |
| Allažu street 2 | Police station | 1902–1903 |
| Āpšu street 24 | Police barracks | 1912 |
| Aspazijas boulevard 32 | Rental house | 1881 |
| Aspazijas boulevard 3 | Riga City Theater I (renovation) | 1885–1887 |
| Aspazijas boulevard 7 | Police department (extension) | 1908–1909 |
| Aspazijas boulevard 7 | Police Department | 1889–1891 |
| Augusta Deglava street 3 | City primary school | 1908–1909 |
| Baltajā street 10 | City primary School (extended 1937) | 1910–1911 |
| Bruņinieku street 28 | City primary school | 1913–1914 |
| Bruņinieku street 35 | Rental house | 1896 |
| Bruņinieku street 5 – k. 15 | Pavilion of Riga City Hospital I | 1902 |
| Bruņinieku street 5 – k. 23 | Riga City Hospital I Women's Clinic | 1902 |
| Bruņinieku street 5 | The main building of Riga City Hospital I | 1906–1907 |
| Bruņinieku street 5 | Riga City Hospital I outpatient clinic | 1909 |
| Bruņinieku street 75 | Rental house | 1890 |
| Daugavgrīvas street 7 | Rental house | 1887 |
| Duntes street 12/22 | Two pavilions in a mentally ill institution | 1905 |
| Dzirnavu street 60 | Rental house | 1892 |
| Eksporta street 2b | Sewage pumping station | 1908 |
| Gaiziņa street 1 | Mary Girls School | 1912–1913 |
| Gaiziņa street 3 | City School of Commerce (now German Private School) | 1912 |
| Gaujas street 23 | City primary School (expanded in 1912 and 1926) | 1911 |
| Hāmaņa street 2a | City primary School (expanded) | 1913–1914 |
| Hanzas street 5 | Fire station | 1909–1910 |
| Jaunstreet 15 | Rental house | 1888 |
| Jēkabpils street 19a | Children's day shelter | 1910–1911 |
| Kalēju street 8 | Rental house | 1891 |
| Kalēju street 10 | City Municipal Institution Building | 1914 |
| Kalnciema street 118 | City primary school | 1912–1913 |
| Kalpaka boulevard 8 | City primary school | 1883 |
| Kaļķu street 16 | Russian association "Ulya" | 1880–1882 |
| Krasta street 5/7 | Spikeri district warehouses | 1882 |
| Krimuldas street 2a | City primary school (expanded in 1926) | 1910–1911 |
| Krišjāņa Barona street 71 | City primary school | 1883 |
| Krišjāņa Barona street 88 | Rental house | 1883 |
| Krišjāņa Valdemāra street 2 | City girls school | 1881–1884 |
| Krustabaznīcas street 11 | 16th barracks of the Irkutsk Hussar Regiment | 1913 |
| Kuģu street 15/17 | Police station | Around 1900 |
| Lavīzes street 2a | City 4th elementary school | 1901 |
| Lomonosova street 1 | Barracks of the Izborsk regiment | 1902–1903 |
| Lomonosova street 4 | City primary school | 1908–1909 |
| Ludzas street 2 | City primary school | 1911–1912 |
| Ludzas street 13/15 | Russian primary school | Around 1890 |
| Ludzas street 24 | Fire station | Around 1886 |
| Maskavas street 172 | Rental house | 1891 |
| Maskavas street 116 | Grebenshchikov Old Believers Association School and Children's Shelter | 1893 |
| Maskavas street 3 | Fire station (expanded) | 1902 |
| Maskavas street 3 | Fire station | 1886 |
| Maskavas street 63 | Synagogue (not preserved) | 1889 |
| Matīsa street 7 | Alexander market | 1902 |
| Matīsa street 9 | Fire station | 1886 |
| Melnsila street 11 | Rental house | 1897 |
| Nometņu street 64 | Agenskalns market | 1911–1924 |
| Patversmes street 20 | City primary school | 1912–1913 |
| Pērnavas street 25 | Artillery brigade barracks | 1905 |
| Pētersalas street 10 | City primary school | 1911–1912 |
| Pilsoņu street 13 | Riga City 2nd Hospital Administration Building (building 25) | 1908–1914 |
| Pilsoņu street 13 | Riga City 2nd Hospital Infectious Disease Pavilions and Surgical Pavilion (buildings 5, 7, 8 and 24) | 1908–1909 |
| Pilsoņu street 13 | Riga City 2nd Hospital director building and Gate building (buildings 1 and 2) | 1910–1911 |
| Pilsoņu street 13 | The second surgical pavilion of Riga City Hospital II, operating room, outbuilding, corridor, communicable disease isolator, morgue and servants' residential building (buildings 3, 4, 6, 12, 18, 21, 23 and 40) | 1912–1914 |
| Pilsoņu street 13 | Pavilions for patients with contagious diseases of Riga City 2nd Hospital (buildings 9, 10 and 11) | 1914–1915 |
| Pulkveža Brieža street 20 | Rental house | 1894 |
| Raņķa dambis 1 | City primary school | 1910–1911 |
| Riharda Vāgnera street 5 | City municipal institution building | 1914 |
| Rūdolfa street 5 | Artillery brigade barracks | 1903 |
| Sarkandaugavas street 24 | City primary school (expanded in 1938) | 1905 |
| Skolas street 36a | Rental house | 1899 |
| Skrindu street 1 | City primary school | 1902–1903 |
| Slāvu street 12 | City primary school | 1912–1913 |
| Slokas street 65 | City primary school | 1908–1909 |
| Sparģeļu street 2 | Shelter for poor children | 1905 |
| Stabu street 63 | Jewish house of prayer | 1899 |
| Stabu street 42 | Horse post station | Around 1880 |
| Stabu street 74 | Rental house | 1893–1898 |
| Šarlotes street 8 | City primary school | 1912–1913 |
| Telts street 2a | City primary school | 1910–1911 |
| Telts street 1 | Shelter for the terminally ill | 1903 |
| Torņakalna street 16 | Rental house | 1895 |
| Torņakalna street 16 | Single-family building | 1900 |
| Vienības gatve 45 | Outpatient and pharmacy at James Armitsted Children's Hospital | 1912 |
| Vienības gatve 45 | James Armitsted Children's Hospital | 1895–1899 |
| Vienības gatve 45 | James Armitsted Children's Hospital (expanded) | 1909–1910 |
| Vingrotāju street 1 | Gymnastics | 1880 |
| Zeļļu street 4 | City primary school and library | 1910–1911 |
