= Āgenskalns Market =

Marketplace and building in Riga, Latvia

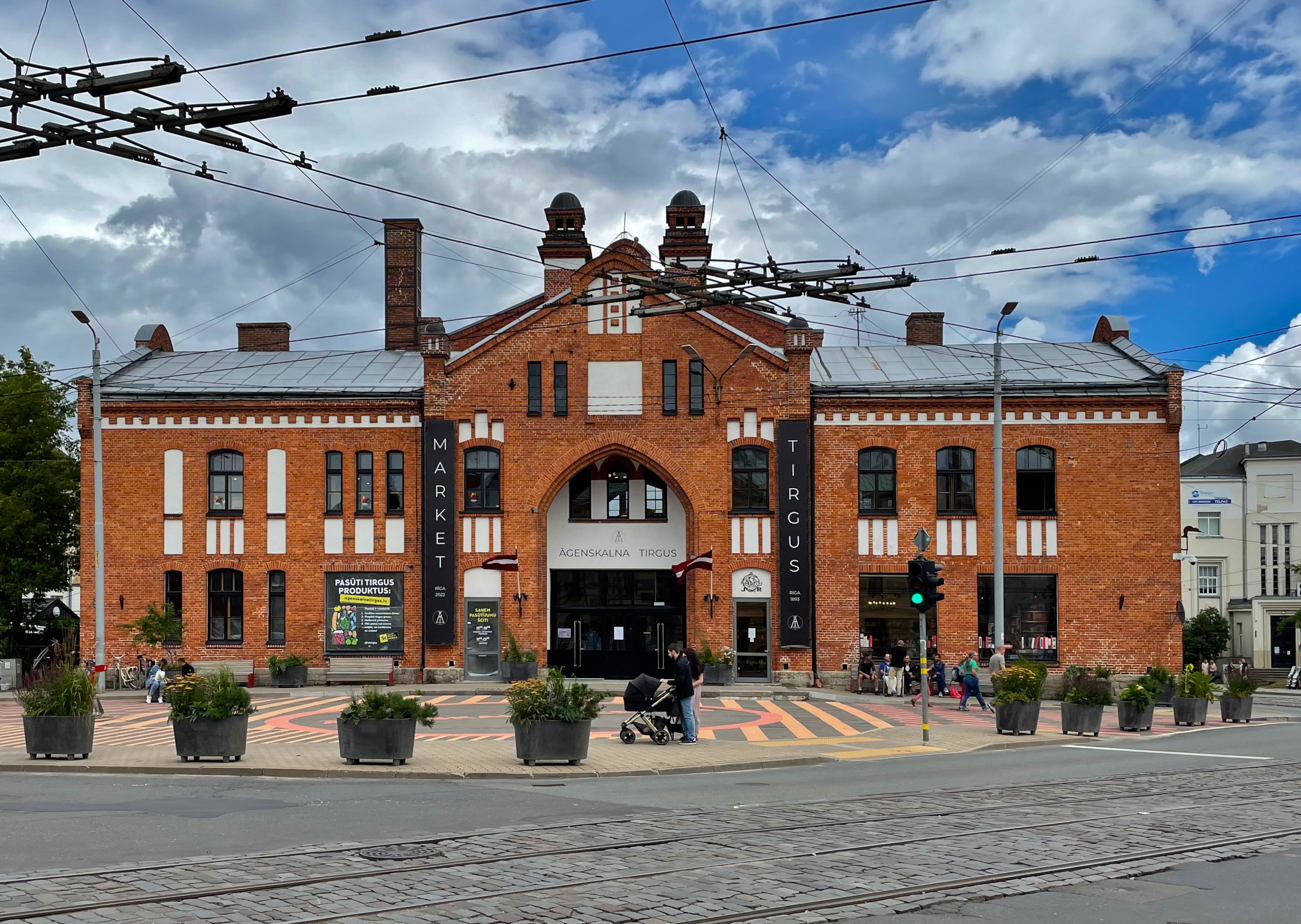
- Location: Nometņu Street 64, Zemgale Suburb, Riga, Latvia, LV-1002; Riga, Latvia; 56°56′9″N 24°04′21″E
- Architect: Reinhold Schmaeling
- Goods sold: Groceries, arts and crafts
- Days normally open: Monday–Thursday (09:00–17:00), Friday (08:00–19:00), Saturday/Sunday (09:00–17:00)
- Interactive map of Āgenskalns Market

Āgenskalns Market (Latvian: Āgenskalna tirgus) is the oldest marketplace on the left bank of Daugava in Riga. Āgenskalns Market’s building is one of the examples of 20th-century rational Art Nouveau.

== History ==
The market was opened in 1898. At that time it was very simple, there was no shelter for people or for the goods when the weather was bad or it was markets closing time. That’s why in 1914 the construction of the building started.

The architect of the building is Reinhold Schmaeling. The construction started in 1911 but it was stopped when building was just half-completed in 1914 because of World War I. It was completely finished in 1923 when its front entrance was re-designed by Alfrēds Grīnbergs.

The main building consists of 219 spaces for sellers on the outside and 2 pavilions: vegetable (116 spaces for sellers) and milk and meat (108 spaces for sellers).

In 2015, Āgenskalns Market was leased to Rīgas Centrāltirgus, however, due to its inability to fulfil the agreement and maintain the market, the agreement was terminated. At the beginning of 2018, the Āgenskalns Market was closed for renovation, which according to the estimates of Riga City Council would cost around 10 million euros.

In May 2018, Āgenskalns Market was leased for 30 years to the company Kalnciema iela. Since 2018 August 3 the outside territory of marketplace is open for sale persons and customers. In 2022, the interior renovation was finished and the market was reopened on 7 May.
