= LGBTQ history in Latvia =

The treatment of homosexuality in Latvia has varied greatly throughout its history, as the country has gone through periods of conquest and independence. Typically, laws targeting the LGBT community and particularly gay men have been harsher under periods of Russian or Soviet control than during periods of independence. Shortly after the fall of the Soviet Union, homosexuality in Latvia was decriminalised in 1992. However, homophobic attitudes remain entrenched, and Latvia is considered one of the least hospitable countries for the LGBT community in the EU.

== Governorate of Livonia ==
=== Legal Framework ===
In 1832, a rule criminalising "copulation between men" (Russian: мужело́жство) was introduced in the Russian Empire in 1832, along with the first collection of the laws of the Russian Empire. It was called Article 995, which stipulated sanctions only for anal intercourse between men, which included taking away all personal and property rights, and exile of the arrested to penal colonies (usually in Siberia) for 4 to 5 years. Moreover, if the sentenced person was Christian, he had to repent his sins in such a way his congregation leader prescribed. In practice, this law was not often enforced, particularly among the upper class.

Attempts to decrease the sanctions for the behaviour mentioned were successful. On 22 March 1903, Article 516 of the criminal code prescribed prison time no less than three months. However, this Penal code was not implemented. The "old" Article 995 was in effect in the Russian empire until 1917, when bolsheviks seized power in the former Russian Empire.

=== In Society ===
In the late 1800s, a gay male subculture began to develop in the cities of Russian Empire. At the beginning of the 20th century, two (more or less) formed subcultures existed at the forefront, artistically and intellectually, with known poets and artists, and the sexually commercial bathhouses, cheap hotels, certain streets and other places of male prostitution. Just as in Western Europe, in Russia, homosexual relationships were most common in closed educational institutions, such as cadet corps, Junker schools, and so on. However, before The World War I in Latvian artistic environments same-sex sexual relationships between men was a taboo subject, so even in letters and memoirs of homosexual people nothing might be interpreted unambiguously as they do not include definitions of sexual identity. Therefore, today one might see only homoerotic hints in the texts of Rūdolfs Blaumanis, as well as in the seemingly passionate letter greetings of writer Ivande Kaija to poet Aspazija.

In entertainment, cross-dressing was a popular attraction. One of these performers, sometimes referred to as "impersonators", started his career at the local opera in Riga in 1903. Since that time Kārlis Lencs, as he was called in Latvian press, had performed in Berlin, Paris, London, America, but in the autumn of 1934 had arrived in a tour to Riga land also had performed in other places in Latvia - Vecauce, Durbe, Saldus. Such entertainment was available in Riga not only in 1903, but also in 1911. Intersex actor, Jespe (hermaphrodite), performed in cafe "Šata". "The actor sings very well, he also really likes young junkers and he is ready to do anything for them. The best idea is to dine with him and in the most critical moment to leave, he will be distraught, but that’s nothing," in a private letter one junker of Polotsk cadet corps advised to another.

In other countries, scandals related to homosexuality took place and were discussed: however, there was not much information about them in the Latvian press. The legal process (1895) against Oscar Wilde, who was convicted on the charge of pederasty and sentenced to two years of forced labour, was widely reflected in the Russian press. But in the Latvian press, it was mentioned only after 1905. Moreover, the authors of the publication did not even specify the crime he was charged with, but used a euphemism: "violation of morality".

In 1908 newspaper, Dzimtenes Vētnesis described the lawsuit (1907) of Prince Philip Eulenburg, a friend of Kaiser Wilhelm II of Germany, against Maximilian Harden, the editor of Journal Zukunft, who in several publications had described the homosexual pleasures of the prince and other nobles. The newspaper also used the terms "homosexualism” and "homosexualist" emphasising that as in Latvian, "there is no name for such human depravities" many might not understand what does the charge of homosexuality mean?". The author explained that the first German Chancellor Bismarck had called the clique of Prince Philip Eulenburg "kinaids", and using equivalent Latvian words, "dog asses". Such statement were based in tradition that was reflected in the Latvian folklore, where the most valued masculine model was denoted by phallic symbolism (rooster, bull, foal, eel), but physically defective, socially lower and sexually deviant men were characterised by symbols of a dog and a wolf.

The researches of European sexologists about homosexuals were translated and republished in Russia soon after their publishing. The ethnographical essay "The third Gender of Berlin" (1904) by German sexologist and homosexual movement activist Magnus Hirschfeld was published in Russian translation four years after the original. The research about "sexual inversion" by British Doctor, writer, social reformer Havelock Ellis, which was banned in England, was published in Russian only after 1909. Essays about "the intermediate gender" written by English socialist, philosopher, homosexual movement activist Edward Carpenter, was published in 1916 with the permission of military censorship. Meanwhile, the most influential Russian specialist was Veniamin Mikhailovich Tarnovski, professor of Imperial Military Medical Academy in Saint-Petersburg, with the book about perversity of sexual desires published in 1885. Until the World War I commercial books that introduced to "the world of perversion" were published in Russia and the theme of homosexuality was widely used by Russian writers in their works. The option to read these texts, at least theoretically, existed in the territory of Latvia.

== World War I and Latvian War of Independence ==
The war gave opportunities to cross the gender lines without punishment. Led by the idea of patriotism, young women dressed up as men to have the opportunity to fight. Some managed to join Latvian Riflemen units in World War I (there are six known women) and during the Latvian War of Independence. War was one of the exclusive attributes of masculinity, therefore those few women who managed to obtain the permission to fight at the front-lines, were given male names in documentation. Līna Čanka, one of the three women cavaliers of the Order of Lāčplēsis in August 1915 with the documents of her brother Jānis Čanks, volunteered at the Latvian riflemen battalion and fought as a man for some time. In 1916, Emīlija K. from Ķemeri, was attached to one of the riflemen battalions as "Pēteris K". She received respect among her war comrades because she "just beat up" those who intrusively tried to show her their affection.

World War I created the emancipation of awareness of homosexuality in the territory of Latvia. Due to the wars large inhabitant masses (and experiences) moved. Migration paralysed the usual mechanisms of social control. Unprecedented possibilities appeared to realise the seemingly impossible, to see what had been unseen until now. In general, that encouraged people to become aware about the diversity of sexual practice.

Transgender people used the situation of war to start their lives in their desired gender. During wartime, Alvīne Osis replaced documents to become Arvīds Osis and joined the army to affirm the new identity. A soldier, who in the beginning of 1919 during the Latvian War of Independence, had served in the North Latvian brigade created in area of Vidzeme occupied by Estonian army, married as a woman. In 1923, the soldier wanted a divorce and asked the clerks of Riga registry office "to change them from a woman to a man". It meant giving out documents that would confirm the respective gender. At the time when there were no possibilities to change the I gender by surgery it was the most radical thing that could be demanded.

Information about the emancipation of homosexuality in territory of Latvia during the wartime is rather scarce and fragmentary. For example, an entry in a document that the person X is "a pederast from the last war 1914-1918", or a note that the accused had his first homosexual experience during the World War I, while serving in army. The documents of post-war Court of Honour of the Latvian Armed Forces indicated that such behaviour among the professional soldiers during "peacetime" was condemned. For example, a homosexual Lieutenant Colonel, who was a board member of Riflemen Society, that is, he participated in World War I as an officer, was forced to retire.

The war did not encourage homosexuality, but it made it easier for men who were already homosexual to have same-sex relationships, overcoming the social and sexual oppression that had been dominant in their lives before then. Hence the war created an interesting paradox. Despite its traumatic nature, war gave homosexual people an alternative environment where they could ignore repressive traditions and to find out their identity. It made it easier for men to investigate their sexual desires outside traditional social structures and 'mechanisms of social monitoring'. For example, the experience of war for one group of the German homosexual community provided the modern image — a gay man as a warrior and the rhetoric that was against the idea that homosexuals have feminine nature.

The war built the self-identity of homosexuals, for example, in Germany homosexual men saw military as the opportunity to show their patriotism, masculinity and their integration with society. Sexologist Magnus Hirschfeld researched the influence of war on homosexual men. From 1914 to 1918 soldiers from the frontline sent him thousands of letters, pedantically telling about their homosexual experiences. On one hand, the army considered homosexuality unnatural and immoral, but on the other hand exactly in the military environment homosexual men "emerged". A soldier wrote that war gave him opportunity to educate his fellow soldiers and dispel the negative stereotypes. Homosexual relationships became more noticeable, and homosexuals were tolerated because they shared the front-line experience with the others.

Incidentally, during the World War I a common part of entertainment if USA Navy were men, who played female parts in theatre. Likewise, British Army paid artist corps that did the same, to perform at the front-lines of Great Britain. The colourful but problematic dressing op of men as women seemingly renewed gender norms in a homosocial (based only on male relationships) soldier community. Dressing up as women on stage symbolically resolved the oppression of sexuality.

== The Republic of Latvia (1918—1934) ==
=== Legal framework ===
After World War I, on 18 November 1918 the Republic of Latvia was founded and it defined 22 March 1903 Criminal Code of the Russian Empire as its Penal Code. In different parts of Latvia, they were in force before the county founded. The occupying power of Germany had declared the Criminal Code as the Penal Code in the administrative region (including Kurzeme and Latgale) of the Commander-of-Chief of the whole Eastern front. Whereas in the German-occupied Vidzeme they came into force in February 1918. Latvian People's Council, already on 15 March 1920, adopted the law about the implementation of the criminal code in Latgale. It means, that in certain places of Latvia the penalty for committing acts of pederasty was decreased already during World War I. Article 516 of the Penal Code named "Immorality" prescribed a prison sentence of at least three months for these acts.

From 1 August 1933a new law was introduced. The new Criminal Code was developed and implemented by Latvian lawyers. Now in accordance with Article 496 a man could be punished for the aforementioned behaviour with a prison sentence, and did not impose a specific time. That meant the Judge could also give a smaller sentence instead of the three months required before.

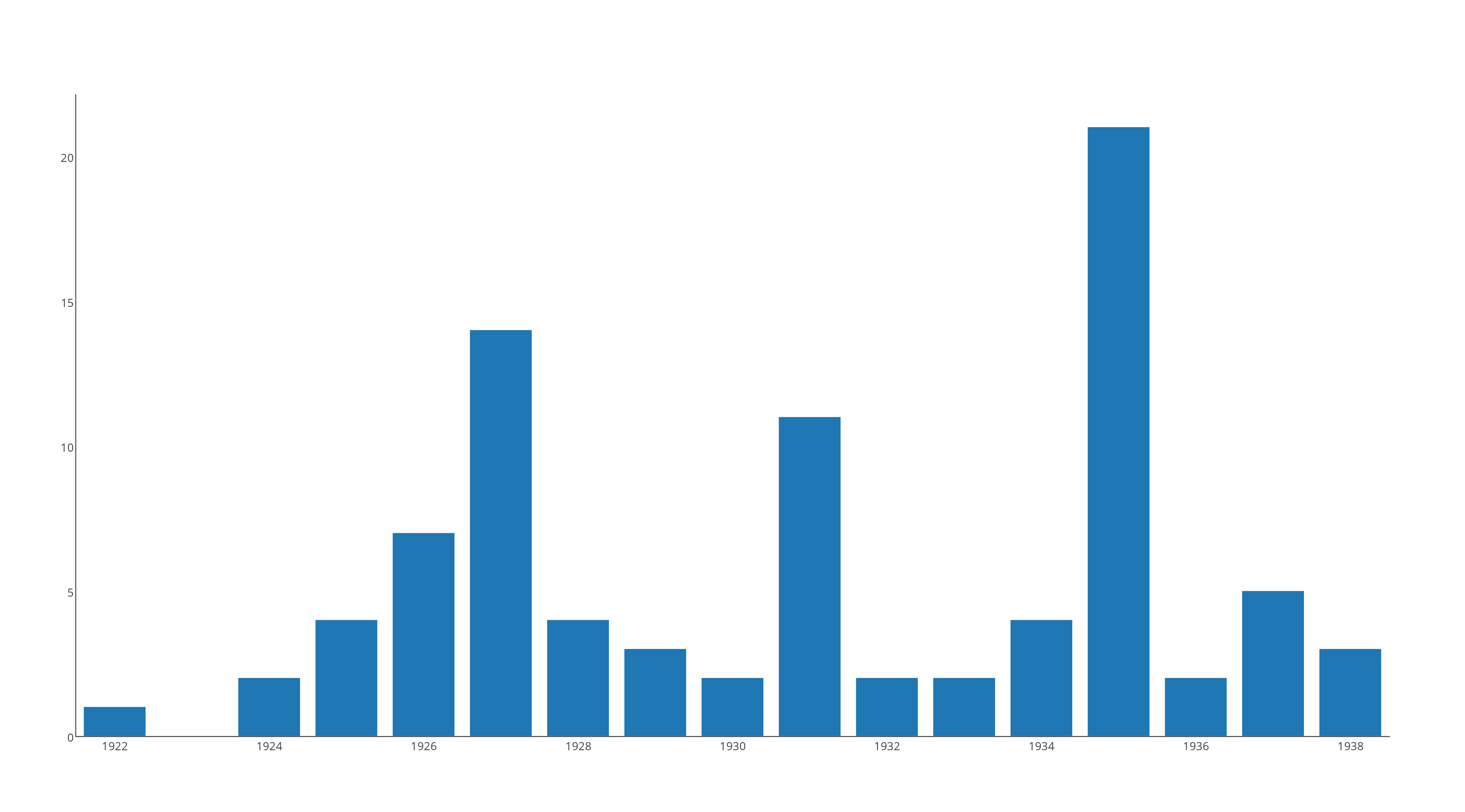
Forensic medical expertises of "homosexualism" carried out by regional or city doctors in Latvia from 1922 to 1938.

In Latvia, within 17 years, doctors carried out 87 forensic medical investigations on men, trying to find physical marks that "would prove homosexual behaviour" (carrying out acts of pederasty). The territorial belonging of them is noted in 82 cases. The most experiments were carried out in 1935. 12 of 21 experiments concerned Talsu District and 7 in Riga. The majority — 7 of the 11 expertises registered in 1931 were carried out in Tukuma district.

In May 1926, the popular German sexologist, Magnus Hirschfield, who was homosexual, read lectures in Riga. But in November 1926, the police arrested several homosexual men and started a criminal case against them. The press called what happened "the Black Carnation club" scandal. The "Сегодня Вечером" newspaper interviewed Professor Ferdinand Neireter, the head of the Institute of Forensic Medicine of the Latvian University, to find our what penalty awaited those arrested. The Professor reported that, according to the theory of Magnus Hirschfeld, homosexuality is inborn inclination which is influenced by the environment and the first sexual experience. Homosexuals cannot be considered mentally ill. Homosexuality also is not a compulsive mania. The intensity of their sexual desire is just as diverse as for heterosexuals, moreover there are homosexuals that during their lifetime do not carry out any homosexual acts. Professor Ferdinand von Neureiter explained, that conviction of homosexuality makes many people suppress their inclinations or live in danger, that their "crime" will be found out and making way for blackmail. And so in many European countries campaigns for abolishing the criminal convictions are increasing. He supported the appeal of Hirschfield to decriminalize homosexuality. The professor's reasons were such: "It is completely logical, because the country has nothing to do with what lifestyle is carried out by adults when they do not make any direct or indirect harm to social morality. The criminalization of homosexuality apparently stems from theological principles, because homosexuality disturbs the implementation of God's main commandment: "be fruitful and multiply".

In 1927, medical examiner Alberts Lokenbergs carried out a forensic examinations on the accused in the "Black Carnation club" case. In the report he wrote:

«Homosexuals satisfy their sexual desires in unnatural way. No woman has any effect in satisfying the sexual desires of homosexuals. Medicine distinguishes homotexualists: 1) those who practice pederasty and 2) those who are satisfied with masturbation [...]. The lowest category of homosexualists are pederasts who are dangerous to society because by buying and using other people they corrupt them. Pederasts cannot get rid of their vices. Regarding the satisfying of their sexual desires they are equal to drug addicts.»

— Alberts Lokenbergs, SABIEDRISKĀ TIKUMĪBA LATVIJĀ, 1918–1940

The court punished for a specific sexual act, not sexual orientation. The society, however, used the concept of pederasty in a wider context to denote same-sex relationships between men.

The Criminal law did not mention female same-sex relationships at all, therefore formally making them legal, because it's possible that to acknowledge that one woman 'seduces' another, would mean the admission of the possibility of female sexuality that is independent from men, which would be contrary to the traditional notions.

=== Public thought ===
The most popular meeting places were the Vērmane Garden, the Greeneries of Opera and public toilets. Men who were well off visited night restaurant Alhambra (it was located in two-floors in a wooden house on 25 Brīvības iela in the block between Lāčplēša and Ģertrūdas iela). Barmaids worked there alongside young men who were called "aunties". Relationships of such type were also available in Cafe "Stambul" (located at the beginning of Krišjāņa Barona iela), where around 10 p.m. and 11 p.m. it was occupied by young men with painted faces, waiting for their admirers. In those days the restaurant had separate cabinets where visitors could sit as in individual companies, where they could be unseen. Some homosexual people used them for intimacy. Several illegal, and therefore secret, entertainment venues existed and people commonly called them "clubs".

In 1933 the nightlife route also included a lesbian club, which was located in an apartment in Tērbatas iela. Householders and foreigners attended the club because the entertainment in it was the most expensive in Riga. No more than five or six men could attend a single show. While sipping expensive alcohol, they watched love scenes between women. If somebody was turned on, they could wait in vain for responses from lesbians. Women also attended the club, but they watched it from different rooms.

"People write to us about a criminal vice, which has started spreading, in particular since the time of German occupation. There is a category of depraved men, who sell themselves just like prostitutes. Especially in summer evenings, when twilight is barely covering boulevards, one can observe them at the beginning of Kaļķu iela between cafe "Reiners" and restaurant "Vecrīga". There young men are "parading" holding their left thumb in their coat collar buttonhole, in that way showing passing "aunties” (this is how those who look for unnatural delights are called) that they are available. But the main place, where the devotees of the obscene assemble was and still is a kiosk in a corner of the boulevard."

— «Melnā neļķe», Jaunākās Ziņas, 1925.11.21

The first extended account on homosexuality in written Latvian press was published in the autumn of 1924 in the newspaper Jaunākās Ziņas, retelling rumours that the surroundings of Viesturdārzs are a home to "pederast club" named "Black carnation". The name is said to be derived from a badge with a black carnation on green enamel, and that it is being used as a club pass. In public thought, a consistent metaphor was created — homosexual men were henceforth called "black carnations". It caught on in society and until the soviet occupation in the Latvian country the word "homosexual" was euphemised with this metaphor. The scandal began in the autumn of 1926, when the head of the main storeroom from the Ministry of War Service Corps reported to the head of the administration of Riga Criminal Police. He told that in old Riga in M. Ķēniņa iela 14 (now Vāgnera iela), several men are continuously meeting in an apartment with the involvement of the new soldiers of the local garrison and "during these meetings all kinds of unnatural sexual acts are carried out between men, including pederasty". However, it was rarely discussed in the press. The most important reflections about book published in the 1926-1927, when a lawsuit accusing several man of homosexual actions was started and settled.

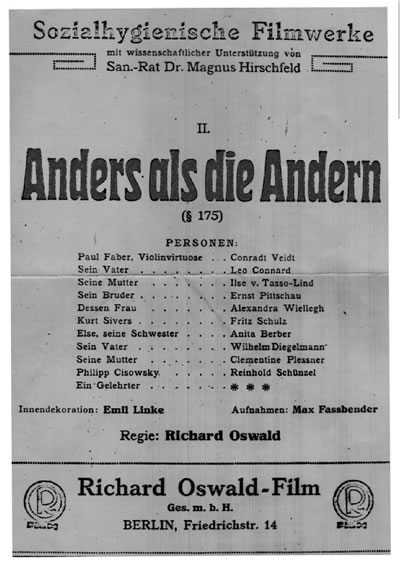
Anders als die Andern

One of the first portrayals in the cinema that was sympathetic to homosexual people, was the film "Anders als die Andern", which was filmed in the Republic of Weimar in 1919. In Latvia it was shown in the summer of 1920, with the title "Homosexualists or under the hereditary curse". In seven long parts, and it was advertised as psychological soulful tragedy, whose "scientific part of the drama is simulated under the known Professor N. Hirschfeld." The advertisement enticed, saying it is closed to children under 16 and "don't miss seeing this picture!". Magnus Hirchfeld, the psychiatrist mentioned in the advertisement already in 1897 established the first homosexual movement in Germany with the goal to decriminalise pederasty. In 1919, he established Institute of Sexual Science and the so-called "third gender" theory (female heart in a male chest), became the most popular expert in homosexuality questions in Europe, and partly financed the filming of the movie. He gave lectures in Riga in 1926 and 1929. Cinema "Vitorija" in Liepāja showed the movie "Homosexualist" on 9 August 1920, while in Riga it was shown in May (in "Maska" cinema) and June ("Moulin Rouge" cinema). The movie audiences considered the movie interesting and gathered a lot of public.

One of the most persistent views about the homosexual people in inter-war Latvia is expressed in the conviction that mostly representatives of artistic professions, especially ballet dancers and actors, are homosexual. Journalist Oļģerts Liepiņš who started his career in the beginning of the 1920s, has left such evidence in his memoires: "I immediately met Mierlauks in an official reception. "Come here Liepiņš, your tie is crooked," he lisped in his aged voice, grasping against my cheeks with long fingers. Back then, I was a rather good-looking fellow; I already knew Mierlauks weakness, therefore I somehow dodged and turned sideways. Those deep psychologists maybe could explain it with a certain constant influence of exhibitionism, which is connected to the showing off on the stage and the game of discovering their "inner person", but it is a fact that among theatre artists, just as it is among ballet dancers there is a known number of "queers". In the rather short history of our theatre the term can be used on: Tautmilis-Bērziņš - he even chose a feminine second pseudonym: Upciemu Made, and Viļums Vēvers. A lot of anecdotes were told about Mierlauks, who was a rather funny character."

Journalist Oļģerts Liepiņš mentioned in his memories the actress Marija Leika and the owner of company "Piena Eksports", Austra Ozoliņa-Krauze, to whom he, in 1934, rented out his large dining room in his house at Mežaparks. His text is a testimony to the fact that alludes to the existence of homosexual relationships between people were so shrouded, that today they cannot be understood without thorough examination of the context. "Austra, who was gifted with more than average intelligence — with "male head", was in charge of "the tandem". Living with me, she borrowed for reading the book of social democrat Dr. Ž. Karlsons published in A. Gulbja publishing house. She read about the physiological types after Kretschmer and made fun of the influence of various sex hormones to sexual deviances. [...] Marija Leiko headed the household of the renters. She made German meals with delight, such as „Ochsenschwanzsuppe” — bull tail soup. Both women drank a lot of strong coffee. Marija also smoked all the time. In those time pants were not in fashion for women, but Leiko walked around in blue skiers pants all the time."

In the nine years (1925-1934) the "Aizkulises" journal was publishing disclosure of public figures' private lives. There were four (favourably neutral) news stories, which mentioned homosexuality. However, facts remain — homosexual people from intellectually artistic community did not speak in public, even though in 1928 a call was made to the actor's theatre group. "In actor meeting a popular actor-director complained, that the competition of two theatres had come so far, that actor S. in an Actors Club had called the actors of the competitive theatre "homosexualists". The beautiful actor had asked his colleagues to take a certain position regarding the issue. The meeting had diplomatically declined to rebuke the offender, because the issue has a private nature and those who feel offended, should take it to the court."

Currently, construction of lesbian history in the case of Latvia, is problematic. The sources have only crumbs of information. Inter-war Latvian jurisprudence did not consider lesbians a subject; therefore, there are no traditional sources, namely, criminal cases, which are available about gay men. Lesbian relationships were explained both in the model of "mommy and daughter" and in independent relationships, which, for example, is evident in the cover illustration of graphic artist Sigismunds Vidbergs for "Eross" journal in 1925. It draws in with the aesthetics of a lesbian couple — in the picture two boyishly slender women are observed by a man who is hiding behind the doors.

A less favourable attitude against female same-sex relationships is evident in the poem of the humorist, Roberts Vizbulis, where the condemnable occurrences of fraud and corruption were caricatured as two lesbians ("two shifty ladies") in 1926. Newspaper "Pēdējā Brīdī" called the relationship of two Rigian women "unnatural" and themselves — abnormal women. One of them was the spouse of a rich wood seller but the other, because of her, had called off the engagement with a public sector employee. The women had frequently walked in Āgenskalna priedes in the evenings. One of them dressed in women's costume, the other in man's sport costume with newsboys cap on the head. Therefore, one was feminine and the other — masculine. The newspaper based the "abnormality" of the masculine partner on her hobbies — "she had driven with men's bicycle, gone to the circus and admired the wrestlers and the neighbours had frequently seen her playing football in the yard. Moreover, one day at dawn her husband had caught her in a hotel room grasping and kissing a maiden, who had been half naked". Both left Latvia together. The feminine one had written to her brother that she is more satisfied with Mrs. B, than her groom, meanwhile Mrs B had informed her husband that the young woman "fulfils the place of a lover".

== Authoritarian period (1934—1940) ==
=== Legal framework ===
If the police considered the facts, discovered through investigation enough to move the case forward, they gave materials to the prosecutors of the Regional Court, which instituted decrees for surveillance. The 21 decrees instituted by the prosecutor of Riga Regional Court are stored in Latvian State Historical Archives of the State Archives of Latvia. However, police gave the prosecutor only those investigation notices, where there was seemingly enough evidence, therefore the number of investigated incidents probably exceeded the number of the surveillance decrees of the prosecutor.

Statistics of criminal cases litigated in the Riga Regional Court:

- 21 surveillance decrees: 13 in the parliamentary democracy + 8 during the authoritarian regime
- 21 surveillance decrees: due to the absence of evidence the investigation was terminated in 15 cases, in 1 surveillance decree episode the investigation was terminated against one of the people surveyed — due to the death of the accused (from illness).
- 6 criminal cases: 1 in parliamentary democracy + 5 during the authoritarian regime. In one case tried, during the parliamentary democracy the court sentenced with the minimum penalty (three months in prison). Two of the three convicts asked for pardon to the president Gustavs Zemgals and were pardoned. In 4 of 5 criminal cases that were tried during the authoritarian regime the judge sentenced with the lower penalty than the traditional three months in prison:
  - three men were sentenced with four months in prison, sentence being suspended;
  - one was sentenced to one month in prison;
  - one with 2 weeks under arrest, but another 10 days under arrest, their sentences were suspended;
  - one with 3 weeks under arrest, another — with one month under arrest, a third — 2 weeks under arrest, replacing the sentence with court warning
  - in the fifth criminal case the judge gave a harsh sentence — the person was sentenced to 8 months in prison.

=== Public thought ===
When speaking about homosexuality in relation to authoritarianism, the rumours about homosexuality of Kārlis Ulmanis — the leader of the authoritarian regime, are frequently mentioned. His opponents and opponents of his authoritarian regime spread the rumours. In a socialist handout spread in the summer of 1934 he was named as the leader of depraved sexualist club "Black Carnation". The Pērkonkrusts National Organization called the Minister of Foreign Affairs Vilhelms Munters the "muse of Ulmanis" and an "intimate friend" in their writings that exposed the authoritarian regime.

An anecdote in the memoirs of social democrat Fēlikss Cielēns has become the most popular "evidence". In 1927 when he became the minister of Foreign Affairs, he secretly created an alternative office to the political administration with Sergejs Staprāns as leader. In reports he received it was rather frequently noted that "dearest Vilhelms" has once again spend the night at Ulmanis place. "Of course what Ulmanis actually did with Vilhelms is unknown — maybe he played cards or dominoes or other heavenly games. However, these observations increased the rumours about the homosexuality of Ulmanis," wrote Cielēns, saying that he mentions it publicly for important political motives. "Currently I will say only that Ulmanis' love for Vilhelms later acquired very substantial societal and political importance, because when he became a dictator he gave his Vilhelms a very high and a responsible office. Soon Riga was full of rumours that Vilhelms' wife was a Soviet Russian spy, but Ulmanis loved his Vilhelms so much that he fully trusted him. Yes, it is true that love makes people blind..." However, only the rumours about the homosexuality of Kārlis Ulmanis are a historical fact and we can only talk about the possibility that he was gay.

== The Soviet period (1940—1991) ==
The facts are fragmentary and are not sufficient to judge the period as a whole. 12 people persecuted for the violation of part 1 of article 124 within the framework of six criminal cases in the 11 months of 1969. 993 men were sentenced across the USSR in 1969, 641 of the men were sentenced in the Russian Soviet Federative Socialist Republic. The other 14 Republics sentenced 352. How many were sentenced in Latvian SSR is unknown.

The stages of surveillance of homosexual people in the Soviet Union:

- The period of Stalinism until the end of the 1940s: the surveillance of homosexuals was under the competence of security police. Its archives are still unavailable, therefore it is unknown how many people were arrested for this crime, using the article that provided sentencing for anti-soviet activities.
- 1951-1960: "a gap" in statistics. During these times the surveillance of homosexuals was most likely under the competence of general police. The legal framework was used with the goal to "clean" the persecutefor the behaviour, which was considered improper for the Soviet people.
- 1961-1980: In the end of the 1960s the number of sentenced people in the Soviet Union sharply rose. This demonstrates that a modernised routine in the police surveillance existed: raids in subculture territories, entrapment, and the use of standard forensic medical examinations.

The Soviet occupation implemented a repressive policy — in the Republic of Latvia the sentence for pederasty was a prison sentence without a specific period, which in practice mostly meant a sentence up to three months. Meanwhile, in the Latvian SSR the sentence for the same offence was imprisonment from three to five years until 31 March 1961. As stipulated in Article 154a of the Russian Soviet Federative Socialist Republic Penal Code. The USSR had already adopted this law in 1926 when homosexuality was de jure legal in the Soviet Union, but on 1 April 1934, the law was supplemented with Article 154a, which criminalized such behaviour. The Executive Council of the Higher Council of the USSR introduced it for interim use in the territory of Latvian SSR with the decree of 6 November 1940. The interim period lasted for almost 20 years. Latvian SSR Penal Code took effect only on 1 April 1961, which decreased the sentence in a way, because it did not include a minimum sentence, but prescribed that pederasty will be sentenced with imprisonment up to five years according to the part 1 of Article 124.

The commentators of the legal regulations maintained that mutual voluntary sex between men is a crime because it breaks the "social role" of sexual relationships, namely the norm that prescribes that sexual relationships should be between people of the opposite sex. "Both participants of such crime are acting with direct intention. They both are aware about the actual side of their actions and the danger to the society and want to in this way to satisfy their sexual desire". Regarding female same-sex relationships, the Soviet judicial framework did not differ from the practice of the Republic of Latvia — Criminal Law did not mention such relationships, therefore, de facto legalizing them.

=== The world and socialist context ===
During the post-war years the persecution of homosexual men increased. The Netherlands and France still operated under the regulation adopted during the war which criminalized same-sex sexual acts between men were older than 21 and those underage. In France the sentence for violating the rules was imprisonment from 6 months to 3 years. However, same-sex relationships between adults were legal. The same was also true in Italy, Spain, Belgium, Sweden, Denmark and Switzerland. However, in Great Britain, Western Germany and the United States of America, sexuality was still being criminalized in the 1950s. As for so-called socialist countries in Europe homosexuality has always been legal such as in Poland, but Hungary and Czechoslovakia decriminalized same-sex relationships between adults in 1961. In the 1950s, one had to be very brave to dare to question the judicial regulations that criminalized homosexuality.

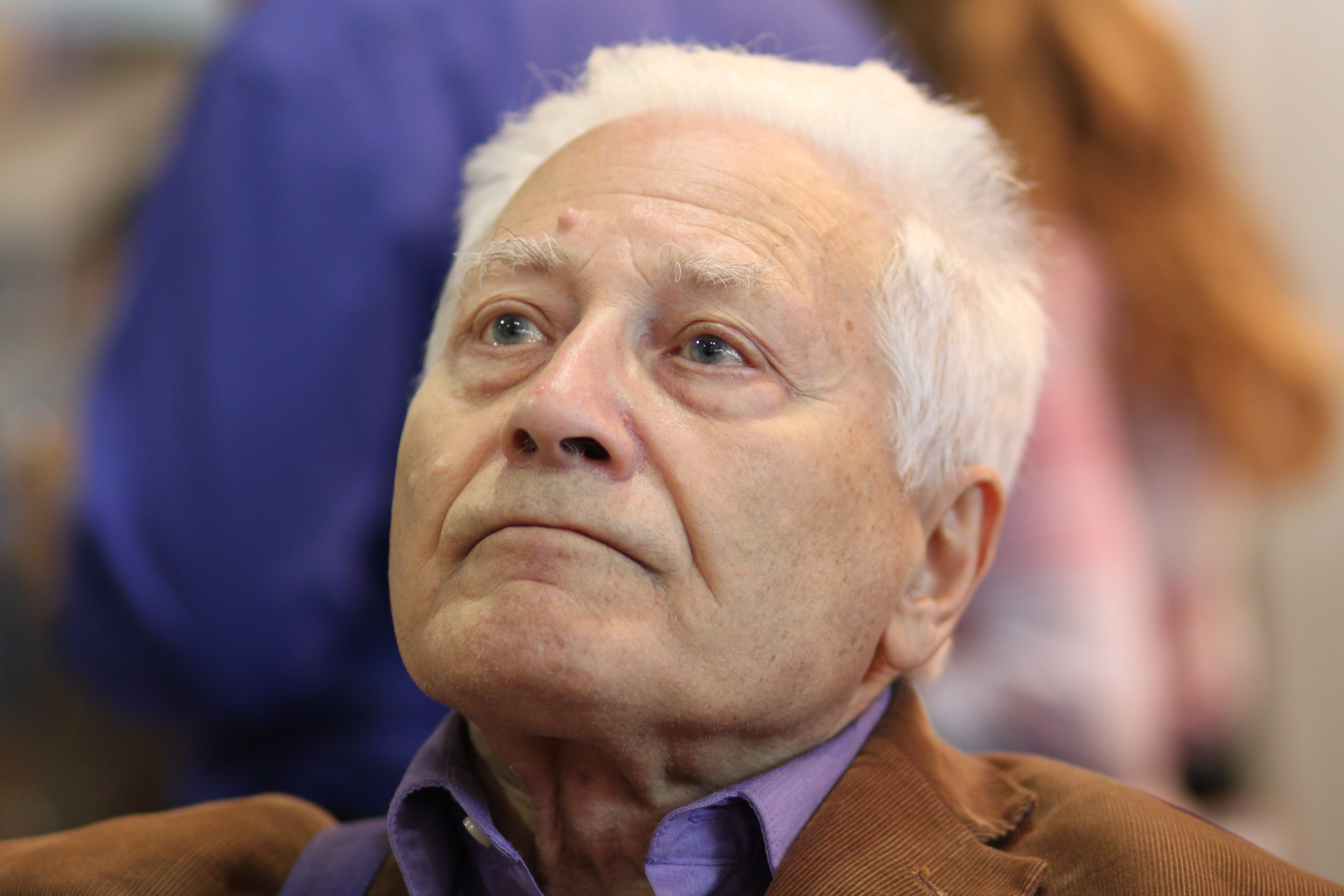
Igor Kon

The European Court of Human Rights were established in 1959, but did not accept cases related to same-sex relationships in the 1960s. However, in 1950 articles 8, 12 and 14 of Convention for the Protection of Human Rights and Fundamental Freedoms guaranteed the individual rights to privacy, formation of family on the basis of marriage, and the right not to be discriminated. In the 1970s, several professionals in the Soviet Union tried to talk about the need to change the legislation. In 1979 criminologist A. N. Ignatov sent a memorandum to the Office of Interior Affairs of the USSR. The historian-sexologist Igor Kon in 1982 made an unsuccessful attempt to publish an article about the legal regulation of same-sex relationships in "Советское государство и право" magazine. In the mid 1980s, when lawyers in Soviet Russia worked with new Penal Code project, police and medical departments talked about the decriminalisation of "pederasty" due to the influence of Mikhail Gorbachev's perestroika.

=== Public thought ===
While records of LGBT life during this period are scarce, an arrest record from 1943 shows that there was a drag party in Riga attended by some 60 men.

Boulevard circles included locations that were used, not only to find partners, but also for homosexuals to be together. In Summer, Kalngales beach was also popular. Advertisement writings on the walls of men's public toilets were the alternative to interpersonal communication. For example, in the 1980s a popular place to relax was restaurant called "Skapis" (Closet) in "Rīga" hotel, which after World War II was built in the place of "Romas hotel" destroyed in the war. Homosexual people of inter-war Latvia also relaxed in the cellar restaurant. At the end of the 1970s, one of "Skapis" waiters was Līga Strode, the future spouse of singer Kaspars Dimiters. They met in "Skapis" and now, in the 21st century as energetic warriors against homosexual movement, they are part of creating the modern history of homosexual people in Latvia.

The possibilities for homosexual people to build a career were dependent on the ability to keep their sexual orientation secret. Frequently, it was a known secret among a company's staff, but it was not publicly talked about. Even if someone was fired because of their sexual orientation, another reason was cited officially. Meanwhile, the methods of getting a homosexual colleague fired were dependent on the imagination of the rival. Some, for example, wrote in satirical office publications expressing hints. In 1960 this was the approach of a staff member of Latvian University to get rid of docent S. "A. Stiebriņš, or as friends call him "bossy", a 46 years old male with thin stature and pinkish eyes. Always dressed particularly. Determines the worth of a person on the smoothness of the tie and the trouser seams. Intrinsic characteristics: nervous, slippery, with pliancy in front of bosses adequate to his surname, ex-teacher - who has retained the dictation method and pastor's tone in his lectures, corrects every comma in the diploma papers, drinks only the best cognac, gladly conducts different practices and in an intimate circle considers himself "a real Latvian patriot". Women hater." The publication of this in the 1960s had no consequences because in the student group, "the Members of Komsomol, did not have enough bravery to openly say everything they knew about the behaviour of S.". However, in 1962 the docent was fired.

On 27 May 1980, the Central Committee of the Latvian Communist Party and Council of Ministers of Latvian SSR made the decision to investigate "the demographic situation and the means of natural growth stimulation of LSSR inhabitants". In 1980 Riga City Committee had worked out a plan with 26 measures centralised around "marriage" and "family".

For example, in 1980 Article 23 required all Riga Party Committee schools, agitation and propaganda departments, the Committees of party regions, the region organisations of "Zinātne" society, the Executive Committee of Riga Health Protection, people's education departments, and the City Komsomol Committee, to develop a lecture course about the propaganda of "soviet lifestyle". This lecture concentrated on the questions of protection of mothers and children, and various aspects of marriage and the family. This was developed in the school year of 1980/81, so the youth in the "people's university" and faculties questioned marriage and family.

Article 24 instructed the editorship of "Rīgas Balss" to widely enlighten the general public about the current demographic situation. Namely to show them exemplary relationships in family and marriage and to inform them about how complex circumstances are created within the home. This is specifically targeted at the ensuring of optimal natural increase of the population and to increase the prestige of three or more child families.

In 1980, Article 25 decreed that administrative departments of the City Party Committee, together with Goskomizdat book selling administration, should organise special sections in bookstores to sell books about marriage, family, pedagogy, and hygiene questions. The task of Article 26 was for the parties primary organisations of Creative Union to involve writers, journalists, artists, theatre employees, cinema, and television to create books, shows, and movies that show the image of "woman/mother", as well as raising the prestige of family and marriage.

The book of sexologist Jānis Zālītis was created due to the decision of Riga Party committee, clearly formulating its ideological position. The book "Mīlestības vārdā" (latv. "In the name of love") was published in 1981. It later became popularised with 99 000 copies printed and fully aligning with the party order. In the book there was only the "right" use of sexuality: "Real homosexuality includes pederasts - people that are dangerous, criminal against the society. When married they do not abandon the vices. The children are born into their families that are doomed to mental deformities because the lifestyle of the father (therefore an example) is solely a perversion. To recommend people of homosexual orientation to many before treatment is a serious mistake. Such homosexuals are dangerous to the boys in transitional age, whose sexual desire is not yet oriented; therefore they can be easily seduced and made miserable for the rest of their lives." Another quote from the book: "If the expectant mother has used hormones to end the pregnancy, smoked, or used alcohol, the children might have inclinations to homosexuality or other perversions. It can also happen in such cases the father of the child has been serious smoker, alcohol or drug addict."

=== Gender reassignment surgeries ===
"You were the only one who understood, that my wish for change was not because, as many thought, to spend my nights with someone, not meant for me from birth, but to get rid of the internal duality. I was also given such possibility — well, let us change your clothing and the documents and live with whomever you want to. But I wanted to live, not play a role in different clothing; I wanted harmony of internal and external worlds. In the past, the internal fight between two "me's" closed me off from the whole world and prevented me from enjoying the joys of the world. I am happy, because I have acquired inner peace. I am loved. Maybe it will seem strange to someone, because fully normal people not always can say these words about themselves from birth."

— The trans man in a letter to surgeon Viktors Kalnbērzs

In 1968 the then docent Viktors Kalnbērzs received a letter from a trans man, who over two years received complicated sex reassignment surgeries. With the support of the health minister of LSSR Vilhelms Kaņeps, the surgeon started the surgeries in 1970. Overall, there were 18 complicated successful surgeries. In the summer of 1972 it could be ascertained that Kalnbērzs managed to carry out the first full female-to-male sex reassignment surgery in the Soviet Union.

Kalnbērzs: "In the first meeting, minister Kaņeps even noted that if the committee wants to promptly meet the party leadership of the Republic, that he can organise a meeting at a bit of a lower level, because the secretaries were busy. However, the meeting with the Secretary of the Central Committee could happen in several days, when the Committee would have already been introduced to all of the materials. The Committee was received by academic Drīzulis, Secretary of the Central Committee of the Communist Party."

Minister: "And did academic Drīzulis support your actions?"

Kalnbērzs: "Academic Drīzulis is not a medic, but he did not have any negative view about the opinions of the Committee and specialists."

— Conversation with USSR Minister of Health Protection on 31 August 1972. Transcribed by Viktors Kalnbērzs returning to the hotel after the conversation.

Kalnbērzs received not only the congratulations from his colleagues and the certificate of authorship of the Inventions Committee of the Council of Ministers of USSR, but also was threatened by USSR Minister of Health Boris Petrovsky with a criminal process and gulag, citing Article 108 of the Soviet Criminal Code (premeditated infliction of serious bodily injury). Kalnbērzs was saved by Latvian Minister of Health, but central USSR authorities decided that sex reassignment surgeries were mutilations and unfit to Soviet ideology, silencing Kalnbērzs and regional Ministries of Health from talking and writing about them and carrying them.

Despite the order, in the 1980s, surgeon Kalnbērzs carried four more sex reassignment surgeries, all to trans men. The patients were residents of Russian SFSR. Trans women also asked to reassign their sex surgically, but the surgeon had declined the opposite surgeries.

== Contemporary Latvia (1991—present) ==
In 1992, free from Soviet influence, the anti-LGBT laws of the Soviet era were struck down. However, the cultural values that they reinforced have remained.

In 2005, Latvia's constitution was amended to explicitly prohibit same-sex marriage. That same year, Latvia's first pride parade was held in Riga. City officials initially denied the permit, but a court overruled the decision and allowed the event to go forward. About 100 people attended. Participants were outnumbered by protestors, some of whom threw projectiles including eggs and human feces at parade-goers.

Baltic Pride is held in Riga every three years, on a rotating schedule with the other capital cities of the Baltic states. In 2015, Latvia became the first former Soviet nation to host EuroPride.

In November 2020, the Constitutional Court ruled that a non-carrying lesbian mother was entitled to the same 10-day paid leave that is granted to fathers. The decision was based on Article 110 of the constitution, which provides state support to families.

In 2025, ILGA-Europe ranked Latvia 34th citing need for marriage equality, hate crime and speech policies and a reform for legal gender recognition based on self-determination.

== See also ==
- LGBT rights in Latvia
