= LGBTQ rights in Latvia =

- Location of Latvia (dark green) – in Europe (light green & dark grey) – in the European Union (light green) – [Legend]
- Legal status: Legal since 1992
- Gender identity: Transgender people allowed to change gender, require surgery
- Military: Gays, lesbians and bisexuals allowed to serve openly
- Discrimination protections: Sexual orientation protections in employment (see below)

Family rights
- Recognition of relationships: Judicial recognition since 2022; Civil partnerships since July 2024
- Restrictions: Same-sex marriage constitutionally banned
- Adoption: No joint adoption by same-sex couples

Lesbian, gay, bisexual, and transgender (LGBTQ) rights in Latvia have expanded substantially in recent years, although LGBT people still face various challenges not experienced by non-LGBT residents. Both male and female types of same-sex sexual activity are legal in Latvia, but households headed by same-sex couples are ineligible for the same legal protections available to opposite-sex couples. Since May 2022, same-sex couples have been recognized as "family" by the Administrative District Court, which gives them some of the legal protections available to married (opposite-sex) couples; as of 2023 November, around 40 couples have been registered via this procedure. In November 2023 registered partnerships were codified into law. These partnerships are available to both same and different sex couples—since July 1, 2024 the implemented registered partnership law has the similar rights and obligations as married couples—with the exception of the title of marriage, and adoption or inheritance rights.

The democratization process in Latvia has allowed lesbians and gays to establish organizations and infrastructural elements such as bars, clubs, stores, libraries, etc. Cultural, educational and other events can be held. However LGBT people in Latvia continue to face widespread discrimination in society. In November 2014, Foreign Minister Edgars Rinkēvičs came out via Twitter, becoming the first openly LGBT elected official in the country. In July 2023, Rinkēvičs was promoted to become president of Latvia. In 2023, ILGA-Europe ranked Latvia 24th out of 27 European Union countries for the protection of LGBT rights.

== Law regarding same-sex sexual activity ==
In 1992, male homosexuality was decriminalized; female homosexuality was never criminalized. In 1999, the age of consent was equalized and set at 16, regardless of gender and/or sexual orientation.

== Recognition of same-sex relationships ==
Latvia does not recognise same-sex marriage, however, civil unions were legalized in 2023, taking effect from July of 2024. The implemented registered partnership law has similar rights and obligations as married couples - with the exception of adoption and inheritance rights.

In 2006, Latvia amended its Constitution to prohibit same-sex marriage. Article 110 of the Latvian Constitution formerly read, "The State shall protect and support marriage, the family, the rights of parents and rights of the child. The State shall provide special support to disabled children, children left without parental care or who have suffered from violence." The first sentenced of Article 110 was amended to read: "The State shall protect and support marriage – a union between a man and a woman, the family, the rights of parents and rights of the child."

On 30 January 2015, an MP submitted a proposal for a partnership law, which would have allowed "any two persons" to register a partnership. This would have given cohabiting couples almost the same benefits and obligations as marriage. The proposal was rejected by the Legal Affairs Committee on 24 February 2015. The Committee questioned the intent on changing the Civil Code, focusing on the 2006 constitutional same-sex marriage ban and how far-reaching the benefits of a "marriage-like" partnership would be, while suggesting that any new form of relationships may need to start from the ground up. Veiko Spolītis, who submitted the proposal, clarified that attaching a gender-neutral partnership provision to the existing code would be the fastest way for the bill to become law. Despite the setback, Spolītis has stated that discussions on the issue shall continue nevertheless. Fellow Unity Party member, Ilze Viņķele, has since promised to develop and submit a brand new draft law. In March 2015, a public petition was started by minor party For Latvia's Development for adopting a partnership law, which would provide for the recognition of registered and unregistered partnerships between couples of any sex. In October 2018, the Ombudsman called on lawmakers to pass a partnership law for both opposite-sex and same-sex couples, citing statistics that showed that about half of Latvian children are born out of wedlock, and that these families should enjoy legal protections and rights. On 20 June 2019, Saeima MPs voted against sending the partnership bill to further discussion and review in parliamentary commissions. Only 23 members voted for the bill, 60 voted against it and one member abstained. Supporters of the bill have said that they will persevere and try to persuade deputies to discuss it again in the future. In 2022, following a 2020 court ruling in favor of parental leave rights for same-sex couples, the Justice Ministry introduced a draft law that would create civil unions, giving same-sex couples some of the same rights and responsibilities as marriage.

In June 2018, the European Court of Justice ruled that EU members states must grant married same-sex couples, where at least one partner is an EU citizen, full residency rights and recognise their freedom of movement. No other rights of marriage are conferred to the couple.

=== Party positions on partnership law ===
Party	In favour	Seats in the Saeima	Position
Social Democratic Party "Harmony"	Partially	0	Extraparliamentary opposition
Who Owns the State?	No	0	Extraparliamentary opposition
New Conservative Party	Yes	0	Extraparliamentary opposition
Development/For!	Yes	0	Extraparliamentary opposition
National Alliance	No	13	Opposition
Union of Greens and Farmers	Yes	16	Coalition
New Unity	Yes	26	Coalition
United List	No	15	Opposition
Latvian Russian Union	No	0	Extraparliamentary Opposition
The Progressives	Yes	10	Coalition
For Latvia from the Heart	No	0	Extraparliamentary Opposition

== Adoption and family planning ==
Latvian law allows any person over 25 to adopt. However, persons who are not married to each other may not adopt the same child. This means that for unmarried couples only one partner may adopt a child. However, lesbian couples can get access to IVF and assisted insemination treatment.

In April 2023, the Saeima passed a series of amendments to the Law on the Protection of the Children's Rights to ban the adoption of Latvian children by foreign same-sex couples.

== Discrimination protections ==
In September 2006, Latvia's Parliament, the Saeima, passed amendments to the Labour Code (Latvian: Darba likums) prohibiting discrimination on the basis of sexual orientation in the workplace. The Saeima had initially omitted such protections, but President Vaira Vīķe-Freiberga refused to sign the bill until it was added.

== Gender identity and expression ==
It is possible to surgically affirm gender in Latvia and to legally change identity to reflect this. Latvian law does not define "sex change", but a medical certificate must be submitted to the authorities in order to legally change gender. However, in 2004, authorities denied a change of legal identity to a transgender person who had undergone a partial sex change. The person, who reported having knowledge of another case in which their legal sex was changed after a partial sex change, took legal action. The Supreme Court of Latvia ruled in 2008, that in this particular case, legal identity should have been changed as the authority had done so in similar cases and the person, already presenting as male, might face a variety of issues having to legally identify as female. This resulted in a 2009 legislative proposal to amend laws, which would have made it mandatory for transgender people to undergo sterilization (which could have caused further legal complications) in order to change their legal gender. The amendments were, however, rejected by the Saeima (Parliament).

== Military service ==
Lesbians, gays and bisexuals are allowed to serve openly in the Latvian Armed Forces.

== Living conditions ==
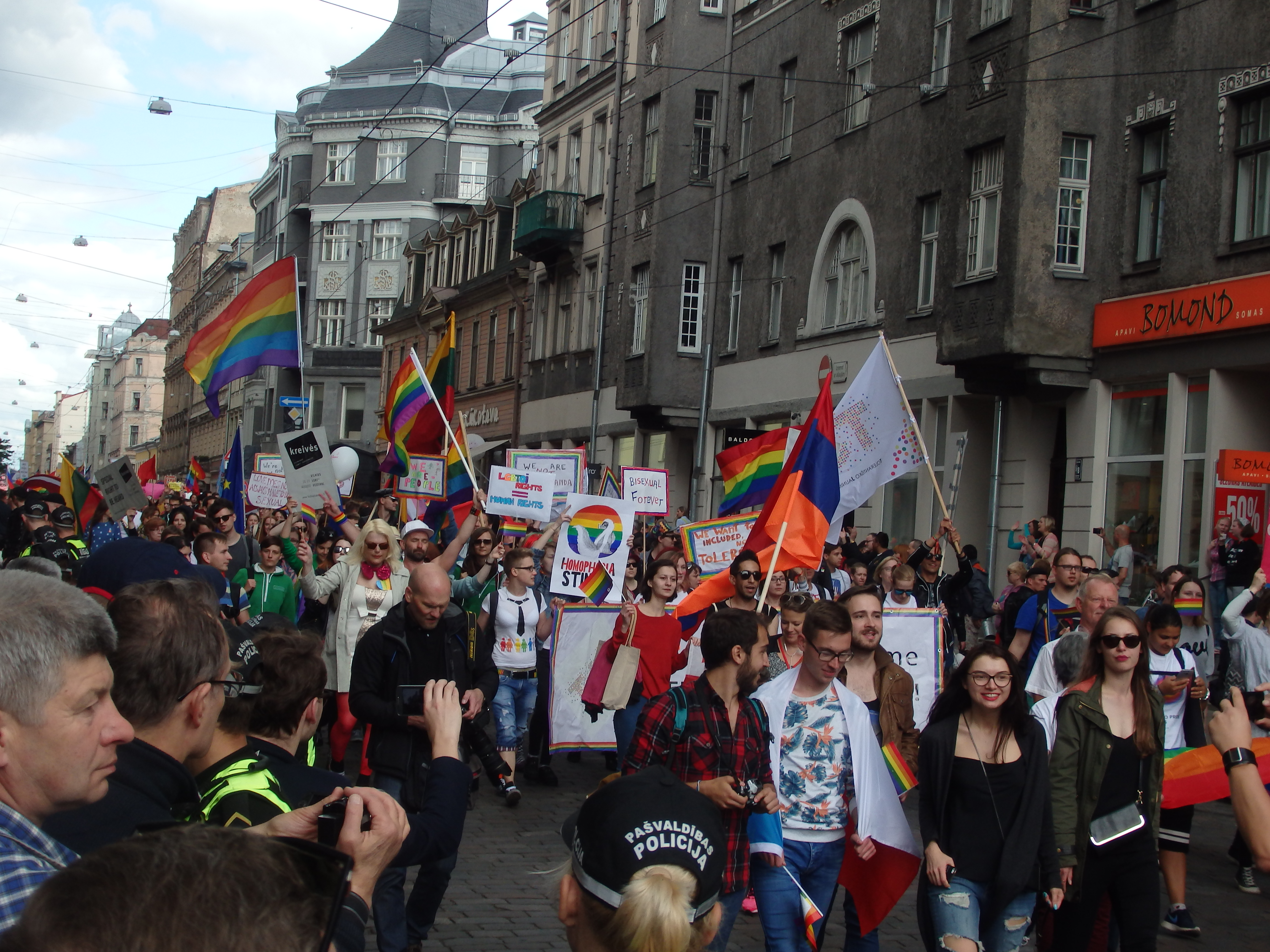
Europride 2015 in Riga

Only in the capital, Riga, there is a small gay scene. Elsewhere in Latvia, however, the sparse population means there is no gay scene. There are few publicly prominent persons who openly identify themselves as gay or lesbian, for example Latvian American journalist Kārlis Streips, President Edgars Rinkēvičs, and former Deputy Rector of the Riga Graduate School of Law Linda Freimane. In the 2018 parliamentary elections, Rinkēvičs was reelected as Foreign Minister and Marija Golubeva, who would later serve as Minister of Interior, became Latvia's first openly lesbian politician, winning a seat for the Development/For! (AP!) party. AP! has declared itself a "pro-LGBT" party.

Most people in Latvia have prejudices against homosexuality, usually rooted in social conservatism and lingering preconceptions dating from the Soviet period. An example of this is the belief that homosexuality and pedophilia are linked phenomena. Such popularly held anti-gay sentiments had grown increasingly by 2008, exploited by various religious groups and politicians.

In 2002, Māris Sants, an openly gay minister, was defrocked and excommunicated from the Evangelical Lutheran Church of Latvia. Archbishop Jānis Vanags later declared in a public statement, "Why Māris Sants was fired", that Sants was not removed from office because he was gay, but because he in his sermons publicly promoted, instead of condemning, the "sinful" homosexual "lifestyle". When pastor Juris Cālītis, then also dean of the University of Latvia's Faculty of Theology, not only publicly criticised the improper way in which Sants's case was handled by the Church Synod, but also allowed Sants to co-officiate in a church service, Cālītis, too, was removed from office and expelled from the church by Vanags. This case helped to create a public debate in Latvia regarding the need for legislation to protect LGBT persons from discrimination by employers.

Due to prevailing negative attitudes in society, and particularly the violent actions of a vocal anti-LGBT minority (e.g. National Power Unity), there is a fear that further lobbying for the rights of sexual minorities will provoke an even stronger backlash. In a February 2007 survey of 537 LGBT persons in Latvia, 82% of respondents said they were not in favour of holding the planned Riga Pride and Friendship Days 2007, while only 7% felt that these events would help promote tolerance against sexual minorities. Nevertheless, the event took place in 2007; in contrast with 2005 where counter-protestors greatly outnumbered Pride attendees and in 2006 where the event was banned. It was peaceful and the 500 pride-goers outnumbered around 100 counter-protestors. However, a simultaneous anti-Pride event attracted around 1,000 attendees. In 2015, Europride took place in Riga attracting around 5,000 participants, while a few dozens participated in a protest meeting against the event.

Baltic Pride 2018 was attended by an estimated 8,000 people. The event took place peacefully, with only about a dozen protesters.

== LGBT rights movement in Latvia ==
Following public manifestations of homophobia surrounding Riga Pride in 2005, some members of the LGBT community, their friends, and family members united to found the organisation Mozaīka ("Mosaic") in order to promote tolerance towards sexual minorities and LGBT rights in Latvian society. In response, an umbrella organisation for co-ordinating anti-LGBT rights activism in Latvia, NoPride, was formed in the run-up to Riga Pride and Friendship Days 2006.

The town of Smiltene in the Vidzeme region, Smiltene Municipality, also had a peaceful flag protest in early 2024, where multiple small pride flags were found in the area.

== President of Latvia Edgars Rinkēvičs ==
In June 2023, the parliament of Latvia voted 52/100 to formally elect Edgars Rinkēvičs as president of Latvia, making him the first openly gay head of state in the EU.

== Public opinion ==
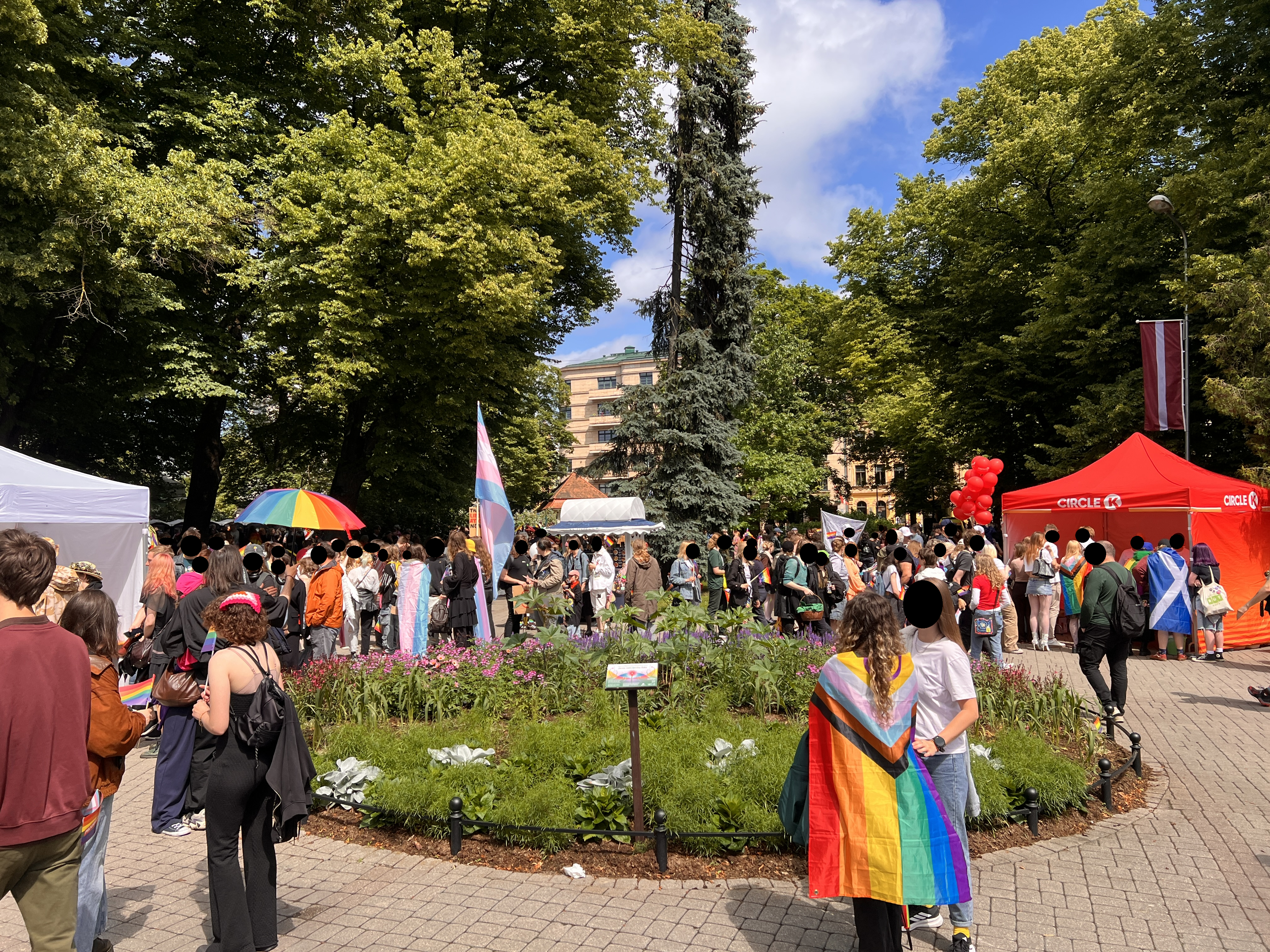
Participants of Riga Pride 2025 in the Pride village in Riga's Vērmanes Garden.

A Eurobarometer survey published in December 2006 showed that 12% of Latvians surveyed supported same-sex marriage and 8% supported same-sex adoption (EU-wide average: 44% and 32%, respectively).

The 2015 Eurobarometer found that 19% of Latvians supported same-sex marriage (EU average: 61%). Additionally, 42% of Latvians believed that gay and lesbian people should enjoy the same rights as straight people and 23% believed that there is nothing wrong about a relationship between two people of the same sex (EU average: 71% and 67%, respectively).

A GLOBSEC survey conducted in March 2023 showed that 40% of Latvians supported same-sex marriage, while 46% were opposed and 14% were undecided.

The 2023 Eurobarometer found that 36% of Latvians thought same-sex marriage should be allowed throughout Europe, and 35% agreed that "there is nothing wrong in a sexual relationship between two persons of the same sex".

== Summary table ==
Same-sex sexual activity legal	Yes (Since 1992)
Equal age of consent (16)	Yes (Since 1999)
Anti-discrimination laws in employment	Yes (Since 2006)
Anti-discrimination laws in the provision of goods and services	Yes
Anti-discrimination laws in all other areas (incl. indirect discrimination, hate speech)	Yes (Since 2021)
Same-sex marriage	No (Constitutional ban since 2006; same-sex marriages performed in the EU recognised for residency purposes since 2018)
Recognition of same-sex couples (e.g. registered partnership)	Yes (Since 2024)
Adoption by a single LGBT person	Yes
Stepchild adoption by same-sex couples	No
Joint adoption by same-sex couples	No
Gays, lesbians and bisexuals allowed to serve openly in the military	Yes
Transgender people allowed to serve openly in the military	No
Right to change legal gender	Yes (Gender-affirming surgery required)
Gender self-identification	
Right to change legal gender without GRS or forced sterilization	No
Right to change legal gender based on self determination	No
Intersex minors protected from invasive surgical procedures	No
Conversion therapy banned on minors	No
Access to IVF for lesbians	Yes
Commercial surrogacy for gay male couples	No (Banned regardless of sexual orientation)
MSMs allowed to donate blood	Yes

== See also ==
- Human rights in Latvia
- LGBT history in Latvia
- LGBT rights in Europe
- LGBT rights in the European Union
