= National Library of Latvia =

Coordinates: 56°56′27.00″N 24°5′48.00″E

National Library of Latvia Latvijas Nacionālā bibliotēka
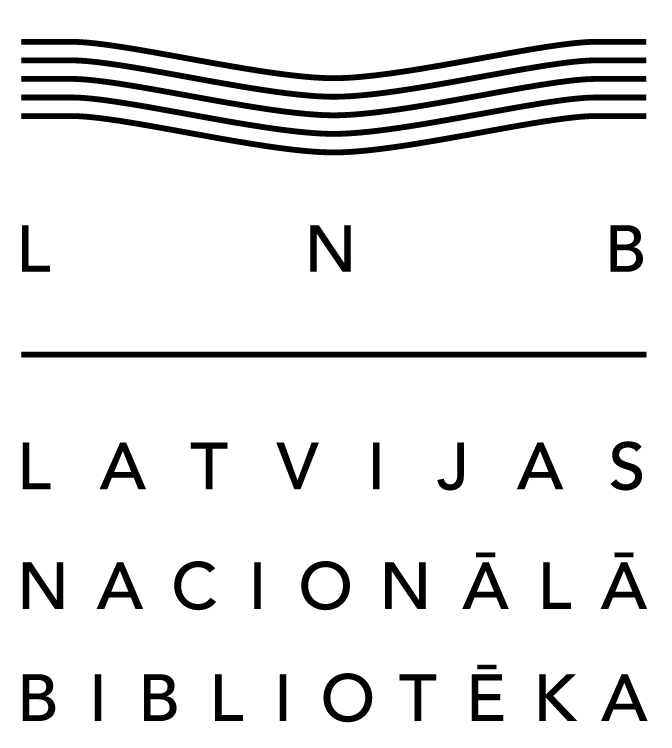

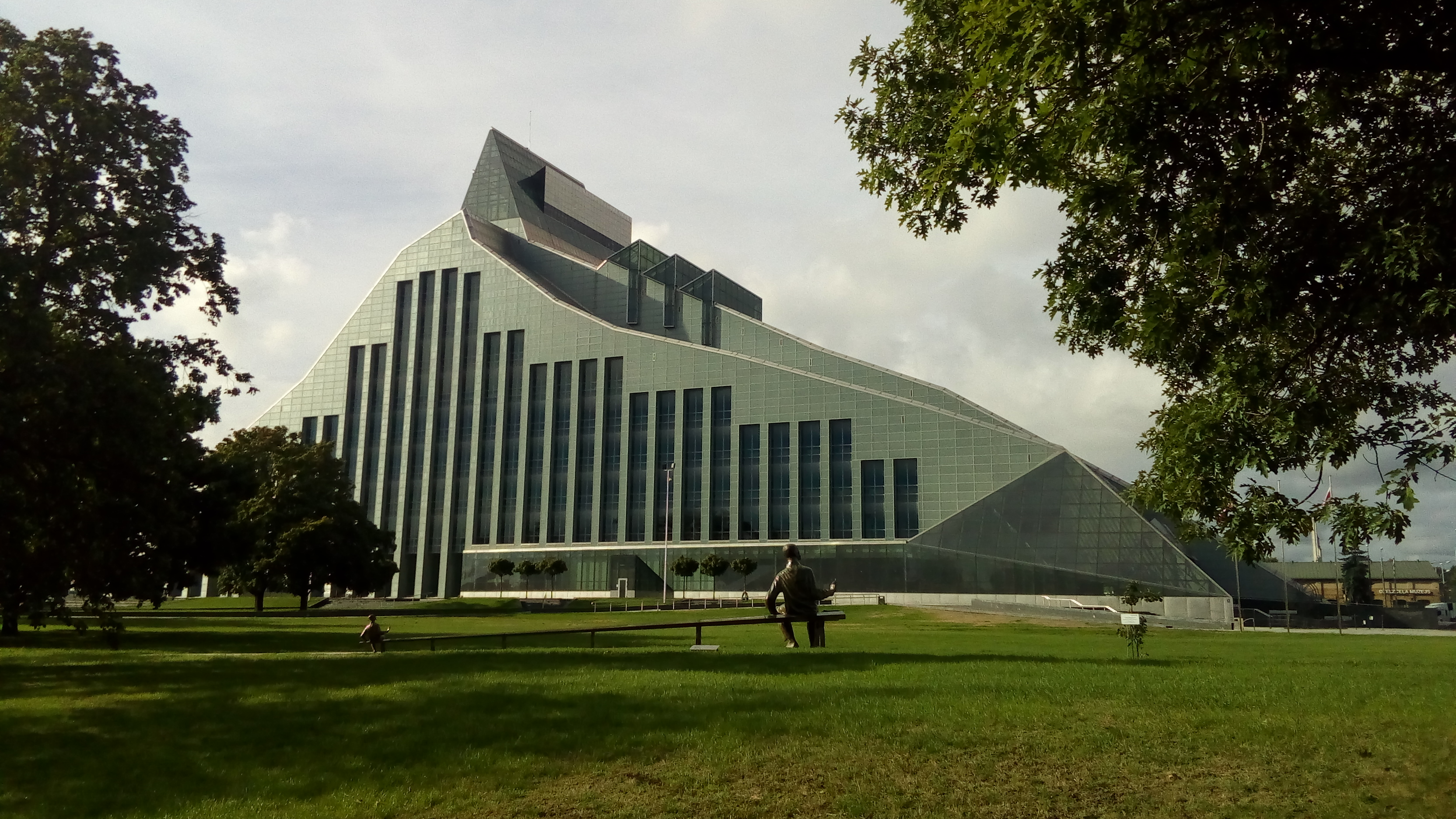
- The main building of the National Library of Latvia in Riga
- Location: Mūkusalas iela 3, Torņakalns, Riga (main); Silakrogs, Ropaži Municipality (Repositorium), Latvia
- Type: National library
- Established: 29 August 1919 (107 years ago)

Collection
- Size: 4.2 million books and other publications

Other information
- Director: Dagnija Baltiņa
- Employees: 372
- Website: https://www.lnb.lv

The National Library of Latvia (Latvian: Latvijas Nacionālā bibliotēka), originally known as the State Library of Latvia, is a national cultural institution under the supervision of the Ministry of Culture of Latvia. Its current main building is known as the Castle of Light (Gaismas pils). (Note: There is also an old library repository at Silakrogs) The National Library of Latvia was formed in 1919 after the independent Republic of Latvia was proclaimed in 1918. The first supervisor of the Library was Jānis Misiņš, a librarian and the founder of the Latvian scientific bibliography. The current building was designed in 1989 by the Latvian-American architect Gunnar Birkerts, who immigrated to the United States and made his career there. It was constructed in the early 21st century and opened in 2014. The library plays an important role in the development of Latvia's information society, supporting research and lifelong education.

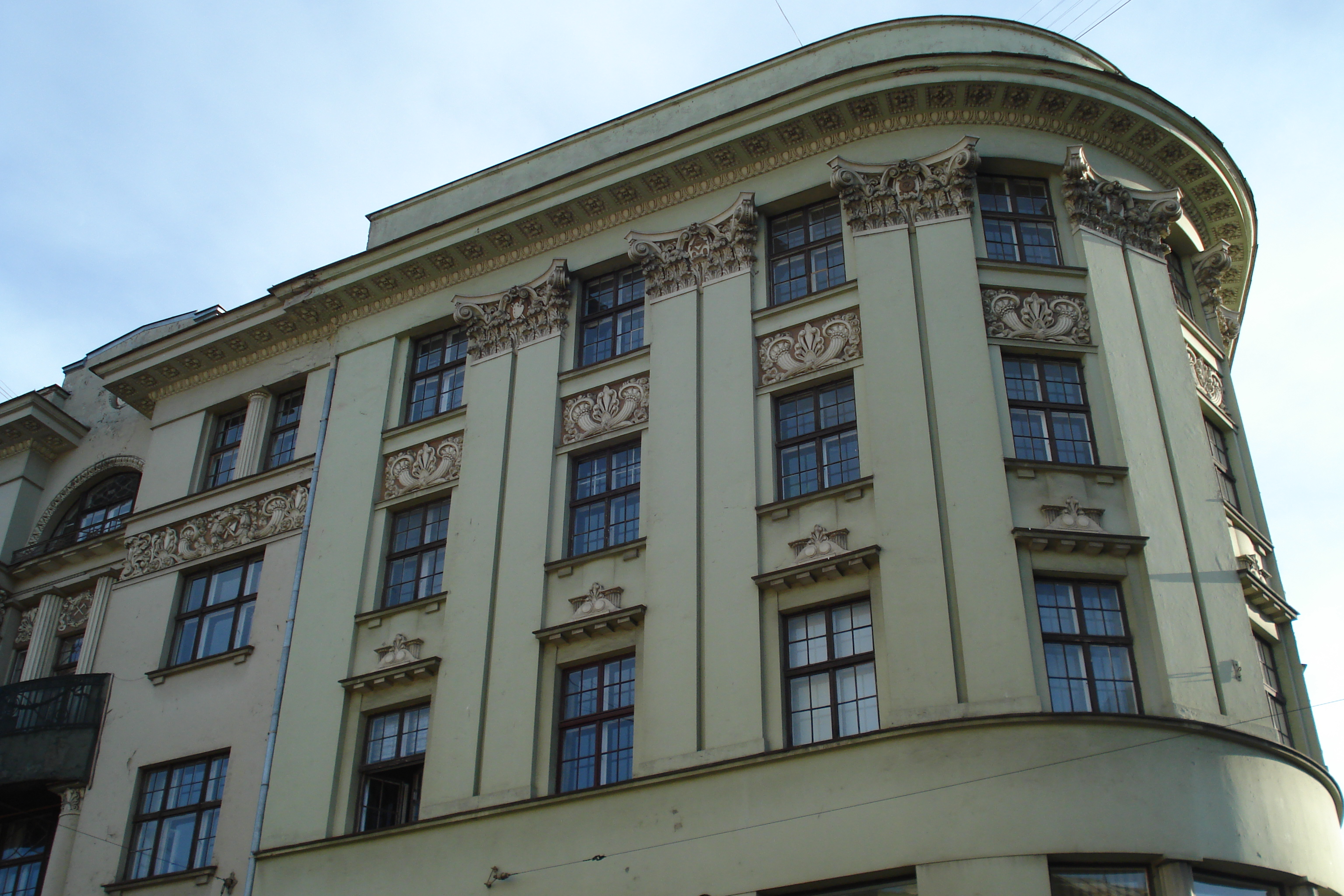
The historical main building, Krišjāņa Barona iela 14

== History ==
=== Interwar period ===
The National Library was founded on 29 August 1919, one year after independence, as the State Library (Valsts Bibliotēka). Its first chief librarian and bibliographer was Jānis Misiņš, who made his immense private collection the basis of the new institution. Within a year, until 1920, the stocks had grown to 250,000 volumes. Starting in the same year, all publishers were obliged to hand in a deposit copy of their works. Since 1927, the Library has published the National Bibliography of Latvia.

There were significant additions in 1939 and 1940, when the State Library took over many of the libraries and collections of the Baltic Germans, most of whom resettled to Nazi Germany. Among these collections was a large part of the collection of the Society for History and Archaeology of Russia's Baltic Provinces, est. 1834, the primary historical society of the Baltic Germans. In 1940, holdings encompassed 1.7 million volumes, so that they had to be stored in two different locations in the Old Town (Jēkaba iela 6/8 and Anglikāņu iela 5).

=== German and Soviet rule ===
During World War II, Germany invaded Latvia and occupied Riga (1941–1944). At that time, German authorities renamed the State Library as Country Library (Zemes bibliotēka), eliminating reference to a sovereign Latvian state.

After the war, while Latvia was under Soviet rule, the institution was known as State Library of the Latvian SSR (Latvijas PSR Valsts bibliotēka). According to Soviet customs, in 1966 the library received an honorary name, commemorating Vilis Lācis, a writer and the late prime minister of Soviet Latvia. From 1946, literature deemed 'dangerous' from the Soviet perspective was withdrawn from the shelves and until 1988, when the Soviet Union gave up control, could be accessed only with a special permit. In 1956, the State Library moved into a new building at Krišjāņa Barona iela.

=== Renewed independence ===
National Library of Latvia at night

Since the re-establishment of Latvian national independence in 1991, the institution has been called the National Library of Latvia. In 1995, it received as a permanent loan the Baltic Central Library of Otto Bong (1918-2006), a collection pertaining to the history, regional studies and languages of the Baltic countries. In 1998, the Repositorium of the National Library of Latvia was opened to store less-demanded books. It was opened at the former Soviet Air Defence Forces Riga HQ building in Silakrogs, Ropaži Parish, Ropaži Municipality.

The new main building of the library was unveiled in 2014 (see below).

== Collections ==
The Library's holdings today encompass more than 5 million titles, incl. about 18,000 manuscripts from the 14th century up to modern times. One of the characteristic cornerstones of the NLL, which characterizes every national library, is the formation of the collection of national literature, its eternal storage and long-term access.

The NLL is a centre of theoretical research and practical analyses of the activities of Latvian libraries. The Library carries out the functions of the centre of Latvia Interlibrary Loan, ensures the library and information service to the Parliament of the Republic of Latvia, the Saeima, implements the standardisation of the branch. Since the very outset, its main concern has been the national bibliography. The massive union catalogue Seniespiedumi latviešu valodā (Ancient Prints in Latvian 1525–1855, published in Riga, 1999) received the Spīdola Prize in 2000 and was awarded The Beautiful Book of the Year 99. In 2005, the Letonikas grāmatu autoru rādītājs (1523-1919) (Index of the Authors of Lettonica Books (1523–1919)) was published, providing information about versatile branches of science and representatives of various nations, Latvia being the main focus of their publications.

The NLL includes several collections of posters (artists Oskars Šteinbergs (1882–1937), Sigismunds Vidbergs (1890–1970), Raoul Dufy (1877–1953), Bernhard Borchert (1863–1945), Niklāvs Strunke (1894–1966) and others).

== Letonica ==
Digitising collections at the NLL started in 1999. At present the Latvian National Digital Library Letonica, which was formed in 2006, holds digitized collections of newspapers, pictures, maps, books, sheet-music and audio recordings. In 2008 NLL launched two major digital projects. Periodika.lv is the NLL's collection of digitized historical periodicals in Latvian with the possibility to read full texts and search page by page.

Latvia has a tradition of Latvian Song and Dance Festivals organized every four years. The historical materials from the first Song Festival in 1864 till the Latgale Song Festival in 1940 can be explored in another digital collection of the National Library of Latvia.

== New building ==
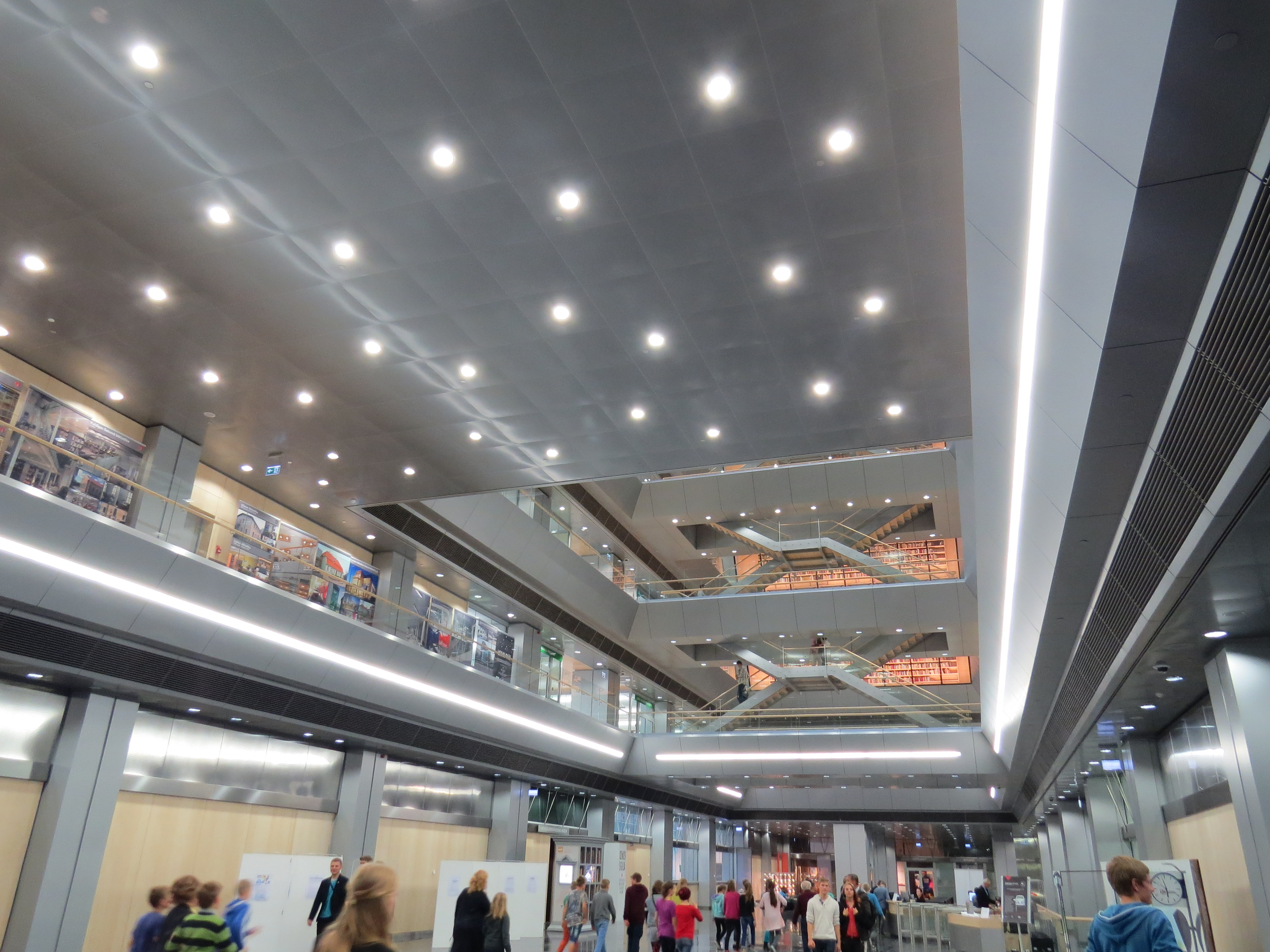
Interior of the library

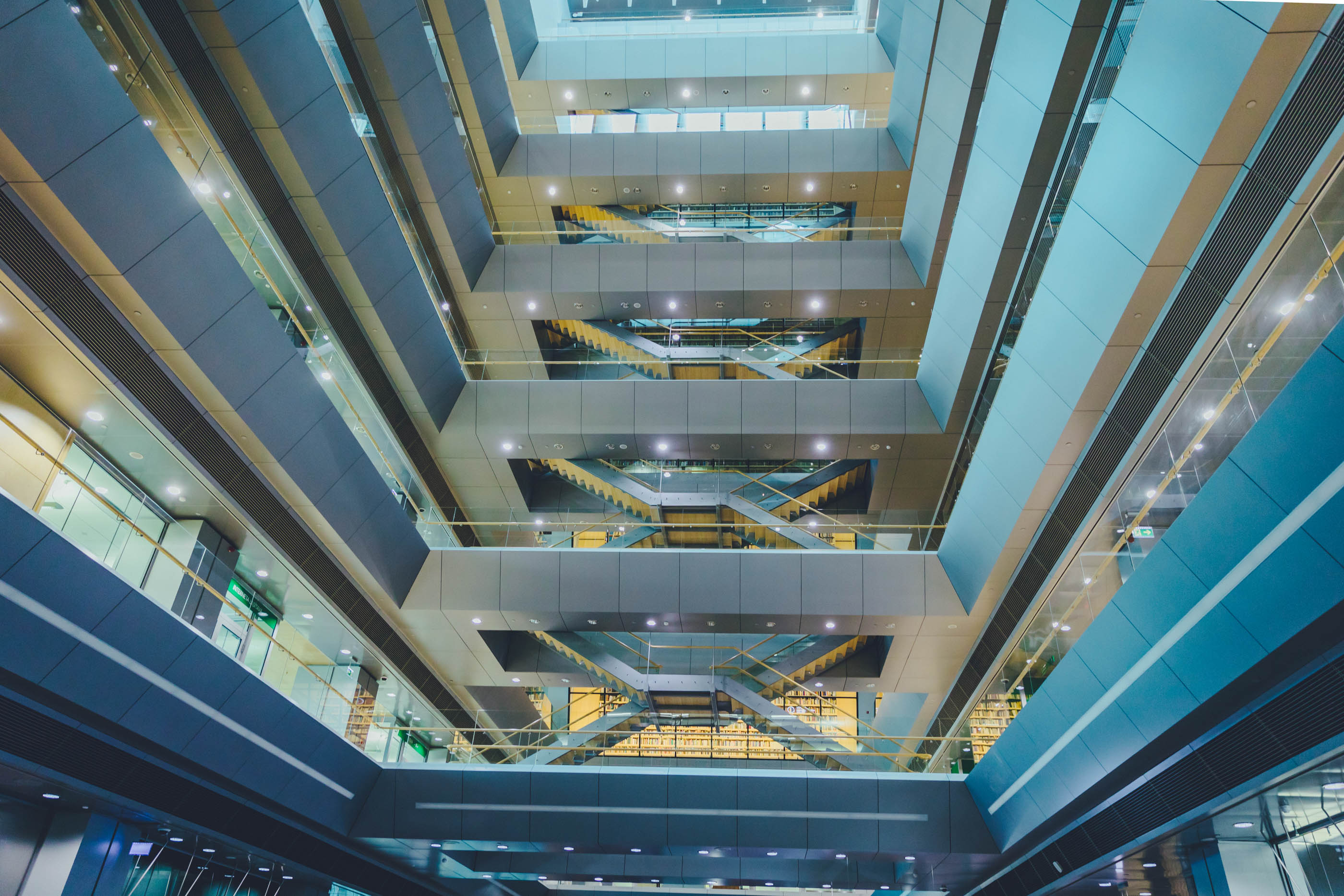
The atrium

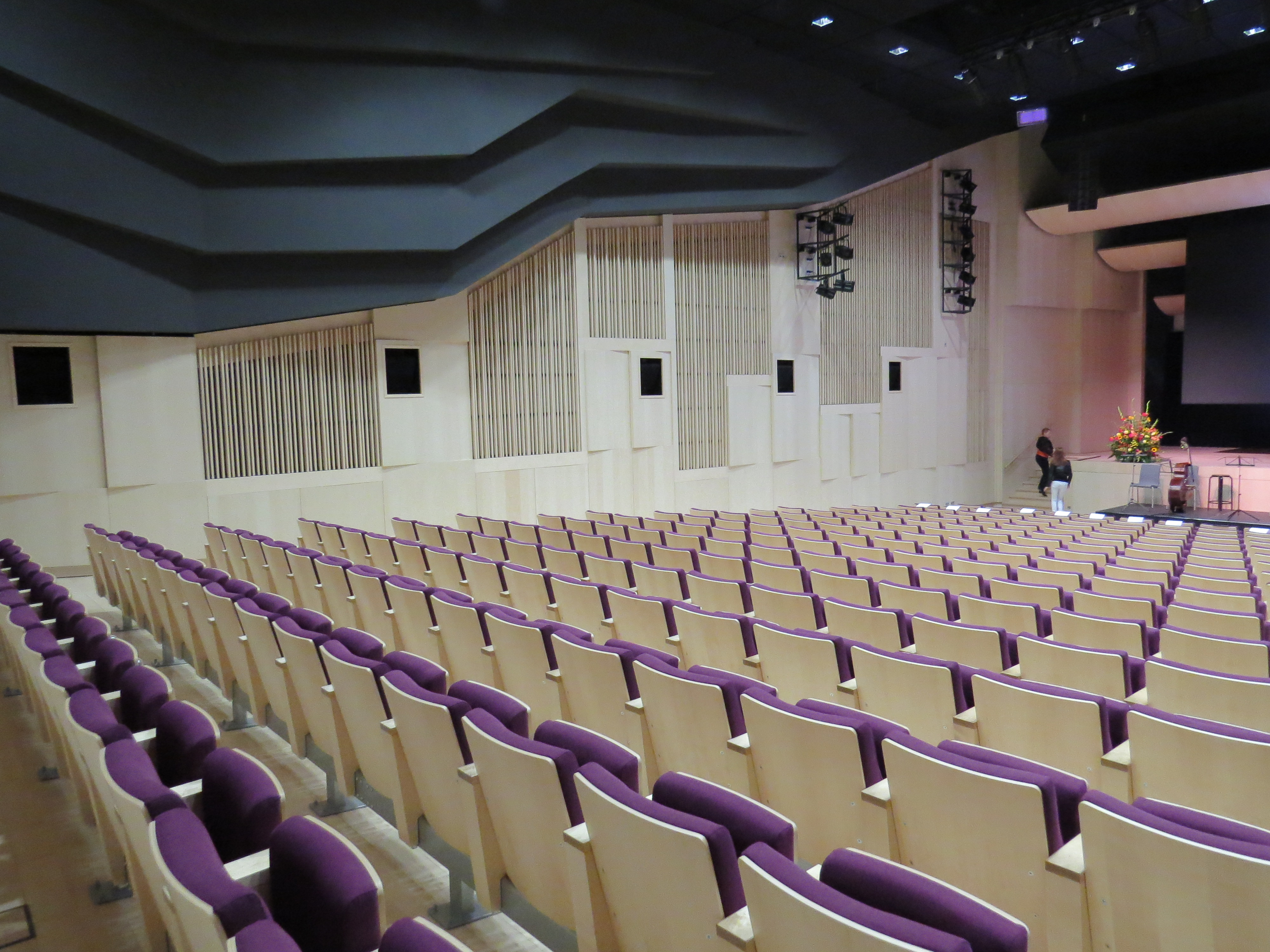
Conference hall Ziedonis

The first discussions about the need for a new National Library began as early as 1928, and the significance of the project of this century was confirmed by high-level international recognition of the value of its collections. In 1999 almost all 170 UNESCO member states adopted a resolution during its General Conference, calling on member states and the international community to ensure all possible support for the implementation of the NLL project.

The continuous growth of the Library had made it necessary to transfer parts of its stock into other buildings. By 1988 NLL had its holdings distributed among five locations in Riga. Furthermore, since 1996, some holdings of rarely used books had to be stored in a repository in Silakrogs outside the capital, in a former Soviet missile bunker. The Silakrogs repository is still in use.

The Parliament finally authorized a new building to be constructed on the left bank of the Daugava River. On 15 May 2008, after discussions lasting for many years, the newly established state agency New 'Three Brothers' (Jaunie "Trīs brāļi", J3B) (Note: The name of the agency "New 'Three Brothers'" refers to Three Brothers, Riga and to agency's goal: to build/reconstruct three cultural objects of national importance: the Library, the National Concert Hall (Riga Philharmonic) and the Latvian National Museum of Contemporary Art. (As of 2026, only the Library is complete.)) and the Union of National Construction Companies signed the contract on the construction of the new building for the National Library of Latvia. On 18 May 2014, the main facility of the Library at Krišjāņa Barona iela was closed for the move.

In 2008, construction started according to the design of noted Latvian-American architect Gunnar Birkerts, who had been based in the Detroit, Michigan area since the early 1950s. He had been commissioned to design the building in 1989. He was inspired by the Castle of Light and Glass Mountain from Latvian mythology.

The new building has thirteen floors and is sixty-eight metres high. Construction costs were given as 193 million euros. 480 people work there.

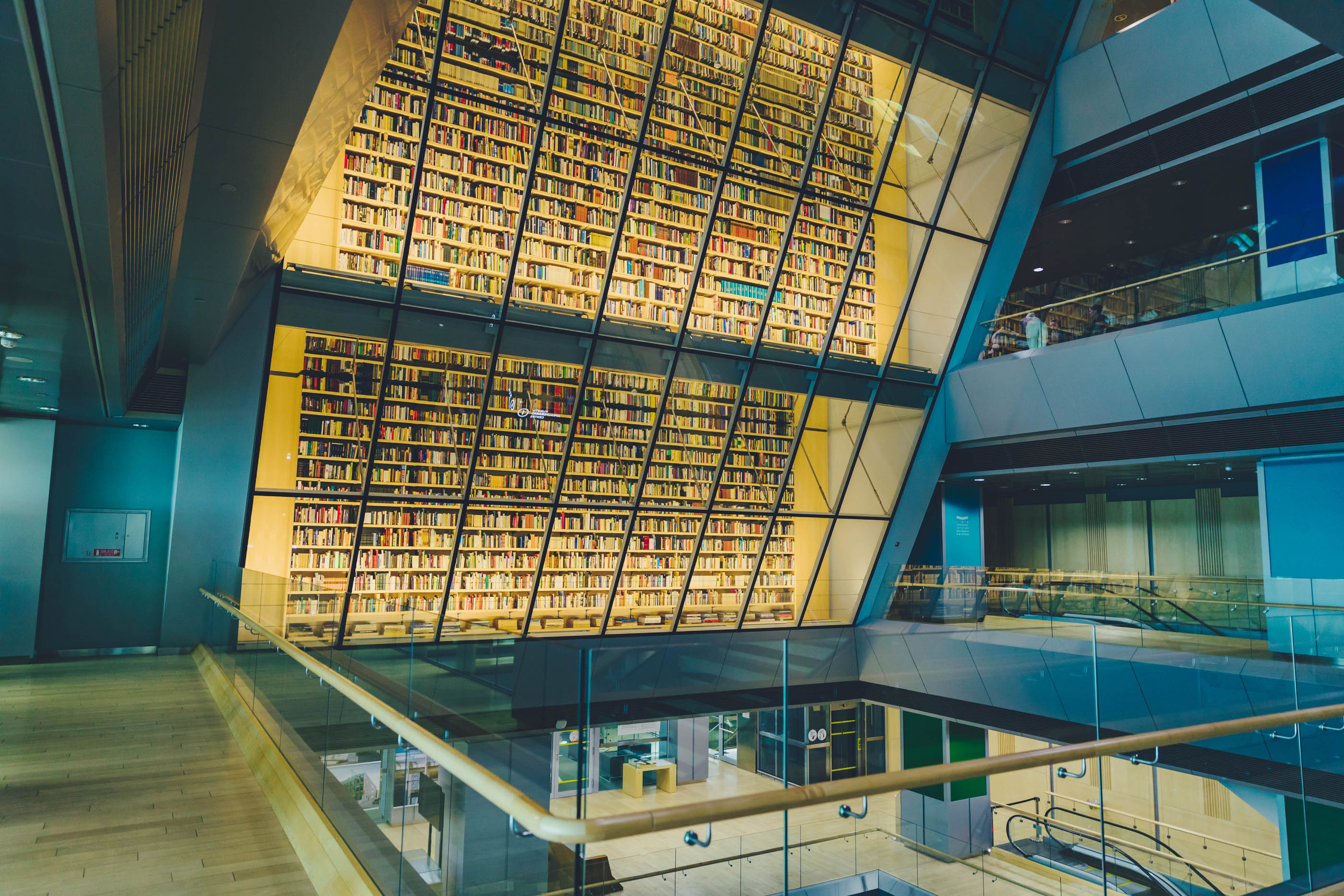
The People's Bookshelf

As part of Riga's programme for its title as European Capital of Culture, selected holdings were symbolically carried from the old to the new building by a human chain on 18 January 2014. The new building was finally opened on 29 August 2014, the Library's 95th anniversary.

Today the NLL building is a dominant landmark on the Riga cityscape. It has space for conferences and conventions, and other community events. Among others, it hosted the 4th summit of the EU's Eastern Partnership programme in May 2015, and a debate chaired by the BBC's Jonathan Dimbleby on 14 March 2016.

The building was listed as an Architectural Monument of National Importance in 2023.

=== Current projects ===
- LIBER 43rd Annual Conference
- Development of the digital library services
- Dissemination and Exploitation via Libraries: for Success and Sustainability of LLP Results
- Effective training tools application to qualification improvement in library sector (ETQI)
- Europeana Awareness
- Europeana Inside
- Europeana Newspapers
- Europeana Sounds
- The Exhibition "Book 1514–2014" and Academic readings "Content of the 21st Century"
- The Impact of Digital text and Multimedia Format on Childhood Learning: a Multidimensional Approach

== See also ==
- List of national libraries
- Latvian ISBN Agency
- List of libraries in Latvia
