= Latvian ISBN Agency =

Latvian ISBN/ISMN agency (Latvian: Latvijas ISBN/ISMN aģentūra) is an agency responsible for assigning ISBN numbers for the group identifier 9984 to books and ISMN numbers to printed music in Latvia. As of 2008 the agency is part of the National Library of Latvia and is located in Riga.

The ISBN group identifier was assigned by The International ISBN Agency to Latvia in 1992 and the agency has been operating since 1993.

Since May 2005 the Latvian agency has been assigning ISBNs only for concrete titles. The assignment of ISBN ranges is not practiced anymore. Publishers can acquire numbers either in the agency or via internet using the Lursoft IT site.

== Publishers ==
As of 2004 the Latvian publishers' database comprises 1393 entries. About 400 publishers were active in 2003 and 180 have published only 1 title (50 of them are author-publishers). The National Library of Latvia has a local database of the publishers. A reference service from it is available.

The Latvian publishing output in 2006 was about 2500 titles, about 5 million copies in total. The average print-run of one title is just above 2 thousand copies. Only 3 publishers have published more than a hundred titles. Zvaigzne ABC is in the leading position with 300 titles. Other notable publishers are Jumava, Avots and Kontinents. Fiction dominates with 613 titles; textbooks 411 titles; science, research and popular scientific books 303 titles; children books and comics 233 publications; popular issues 113 titles. The other types of publications do not reach 100 titles a year.

There are 27 music publishers in Latvia.
