= Riga Russian Theatre =

Russian-language theatre in Riga, Latvia

Coordinates: 56°56′56.23″N 24°06′34.77″E

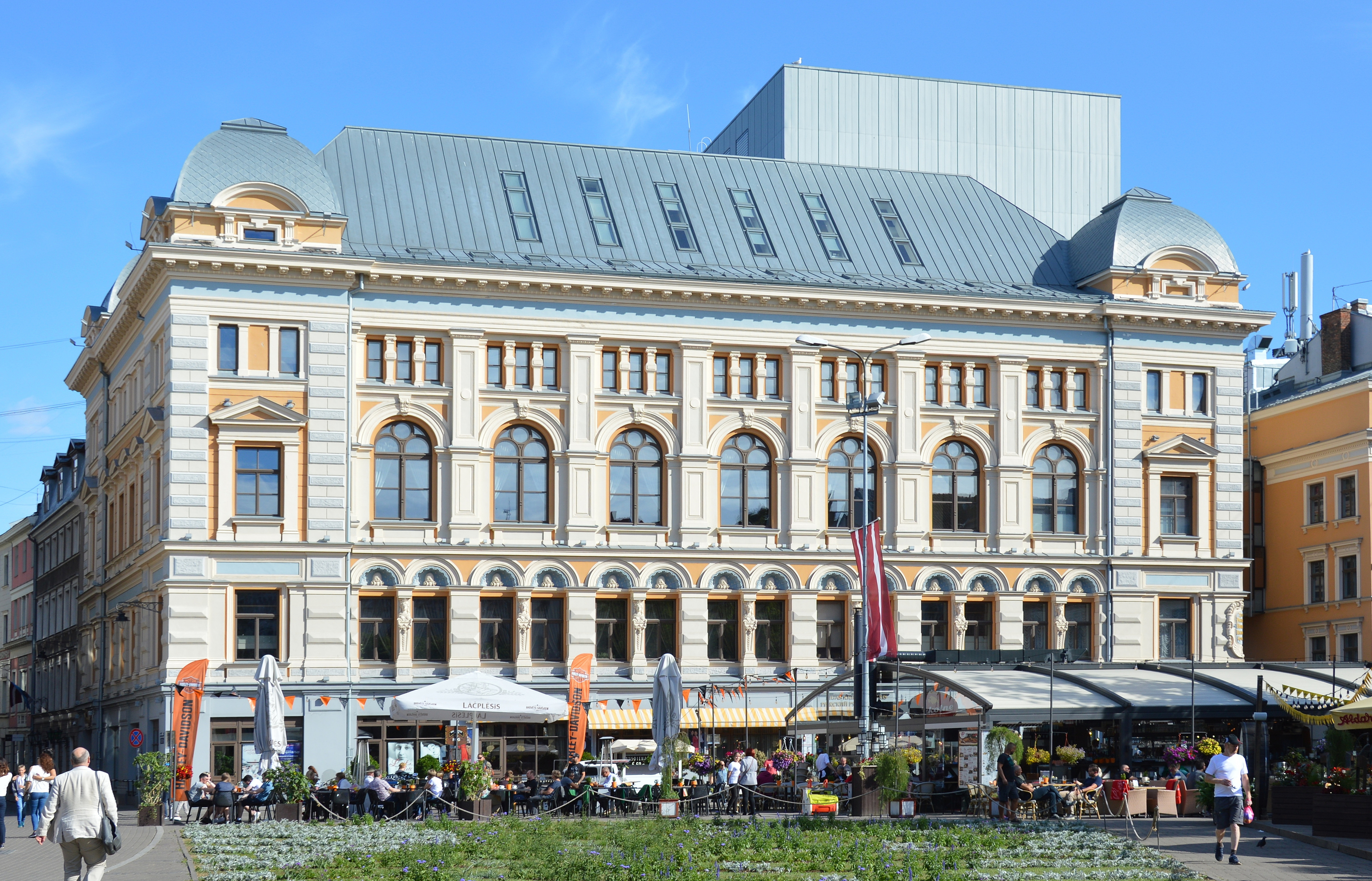
Mikhail Chekhov Riga Russian Theatre

The Mikhail Chekhov Riga Russian Theatre (Latvian: Mihaila Čehova Rīgas Krievu teātris, Russian: Рижский русский театр имени Михаила Чехова), colloquially referred to as the Russian Theatre (Latvian: Krievu teātris, Russian: Русский театр) or the RRT, is a Russian-language theatre in Riga, Latvia. It is located on 16 Kaļķu iela, Riga.

The Mikhail Chekhov Riga Russian Theatre (known before 2006 as Riga Russian Drama Theatre) was founded in 1883, making it the oldest Russian-language drama theatre outside Russia. The original troupe consisted of sixteen actors. The theatre grew during the 19th century and had something of a golden age during the leadership of K.N. Nezlobin, prior to the Russian Revolution. The theatre continued to operate after Latvia became an independent country following the Latvian War of Independence (1918–20). During the subsequent Soviet occupation of Latvia, the theatre continued to operate, but had to adapt to the political censorship of the day. It did not put on any performances during World War II. Following the dissolution of the Soviet Union and the re-establishment of Latvian independence, the theatre can once more offer a mix of classical plays and new, innovative plays. In 2006, it was named after Michael Chekhov, who spent two years in Riga (1932–1934) and influenced the Latvian theatre and performing arts.

Since the 8 January 2018, the theatre has been led by Dana Bjorka, general manager and member of the board.
