= Veiko Spolītis =

Latvian politician (born 1971)

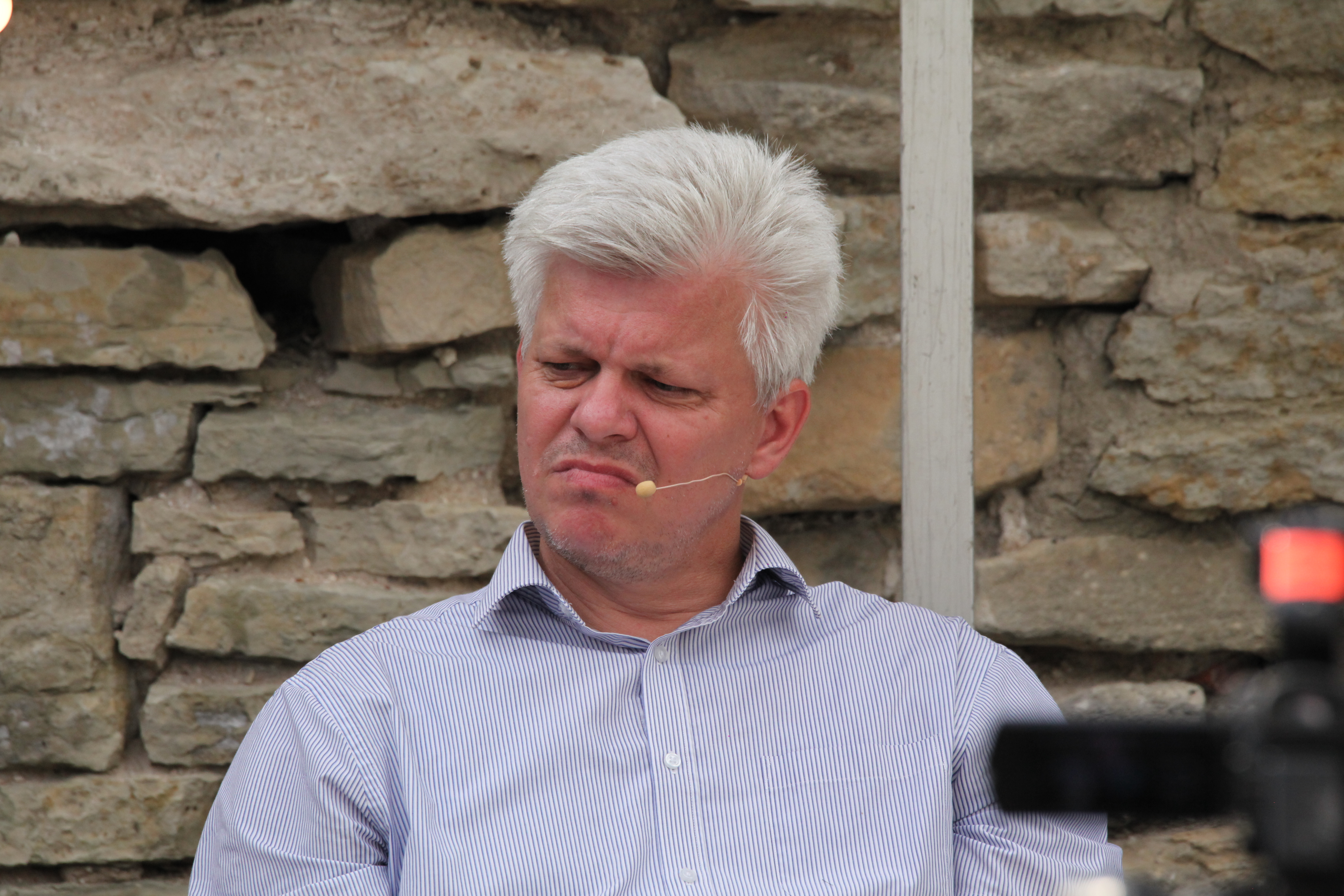
- Veiko Spolītis in 2021.

Member of the Saeima
- In office 2014–2018

Personal details
- Born: 5 September 1971 (age 54) Riga, Latvian SSR, Soviet Union (now Latvia)
- Party: New Unity (formerly Unity, Latvian Farmers' Union)
- Education: University of Tartu (BA); Central European University (MA); Graduate Institute of International Studies (MA)
- Occupation: Politician, Lecturer
- Awards: Order of the Cross of Terra Mariana IV Class; Knight Order of the Order of the Lion of Finland

Veiko Spolītis (born 5 September 1971) is a Latvian politician, representing the Unity party (Latvian: Vienotība). From 2014 until 2018, he served as an elected member of the Saeima.

== Biography ==
Veiko Spolītis was born in Riga to a Latvian father and an Estonian mother. Spolītis has two native languages: Latvian and Estonian.

He obtained a bachelor's degree in political science from the University of Tartu in 1996. He went on to get a master's degree in European studies and international relations in 1997 at the Central European University of Budapest, and a master's degree in history in 2003 at the Graduate Institute of International Studies in Geneva.

In 1998, he became a lecturer of European Studies at Riga Stradiņš University; a position he held until 2010.

In 2012, he received the Order of the Cross of Terra Mariana IV class, and in 2013 the Knight Order of the Order of the Lion of Finland.

== Political career ==
He was elected in 2001 on the Salaspils City Council as part of the list of the Latvian Farmers' Union. After a stint as the parliamentary secretary of the Ministry of Defence, he became Deputy Minister of Defense of Latvia from 2010 to 2013.

In 2014, he made a bid to get elected to the 2014 Latvian parliamentary election but was defeated. Still, he won a temporary mandate in parliament while another contender who ran on the same electoral list of the Unity party but was elected, Edgars Rinkēvičs, fulfilled his duties as minister.

A few days before he was set to join Parliament, Veiko Spolītis was arrested for driving while under the influence of alcohol. His driver's license was revoked for two years. He announced his withdrawal from the Unity party, but continued to work in Parliament as part of the New Unity faction.
