= Kaļķu iela =

Street in Riga, Latvia

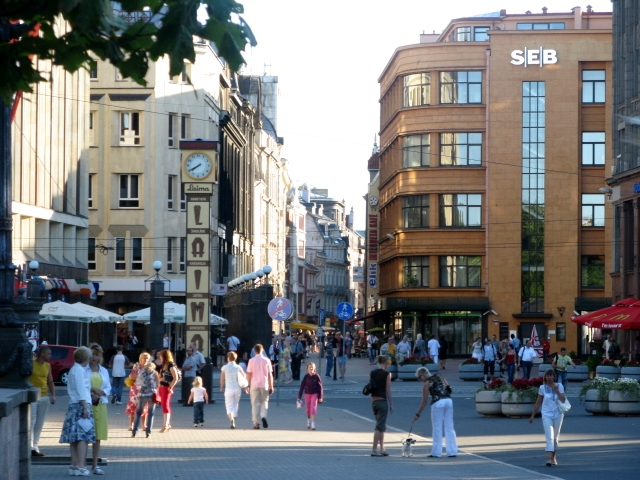
- View of Kaļķu iela towards the city centre, from Brīvības bulvāris

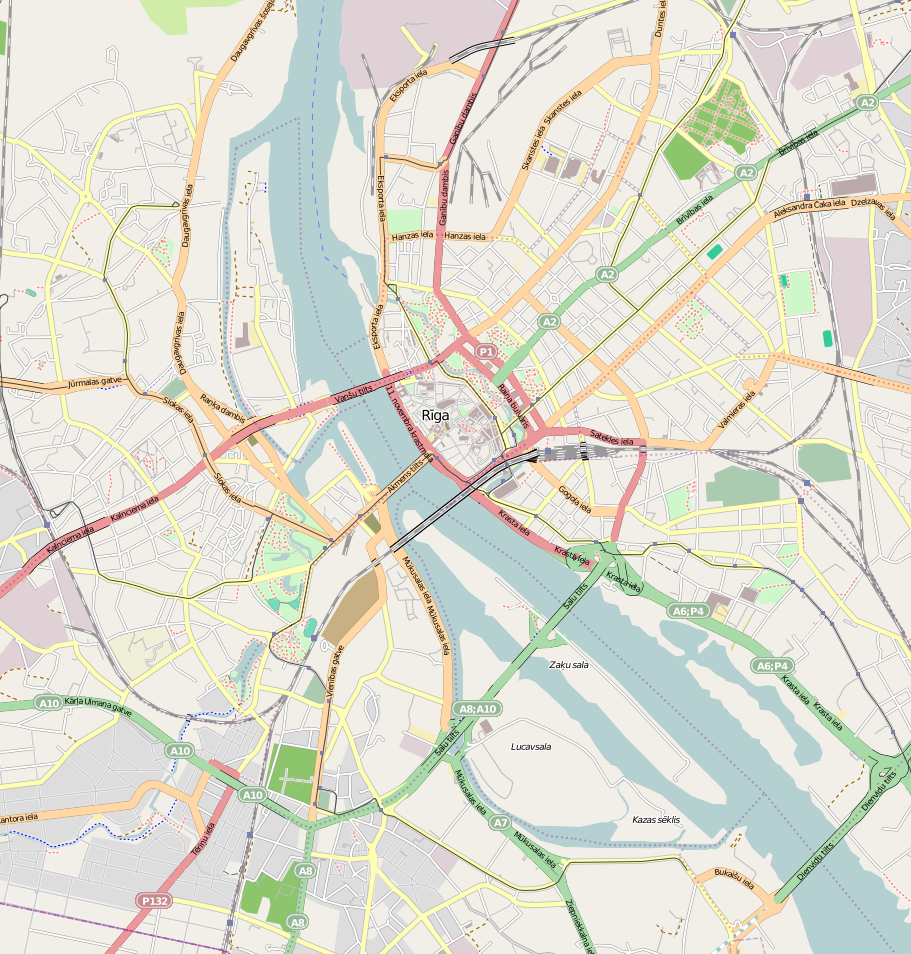
- Location within Riga
- Native name: Kaļķu iela (Latvian)
- Former names: Kalkstraße; Ļeņina iela
- Length: 583 m (1,913 ft)
- Location: Riga, Latvia
- Coordinates: 56°56′55″N 24°06′30″E

Other
- Known for: the Anton Chekhov Russian Theatre of Riga

Kaļķu iela (Lime Street) is a street in the medieval old town of Riga, Latvia. The street begins at the central square Rātslaukums ([Riga] City Hall Square) and goes to the North East as far as the boundary of the historical centre. Brīvības iela and Brīvības bulvāris form a continuation of Kaļķu iela.

== History ==
The street was first mentioned in 1407. In 1950, during the Soviet occupation of Latvia, Kaļķu iela was merged with Brīvības iela and Brīvības bulvāris to form the central street of Soviet Riga that was called Lenin Street (Latvian: Ļeņina iela, Russian: улицa Ленина).

== Notable buildings ==
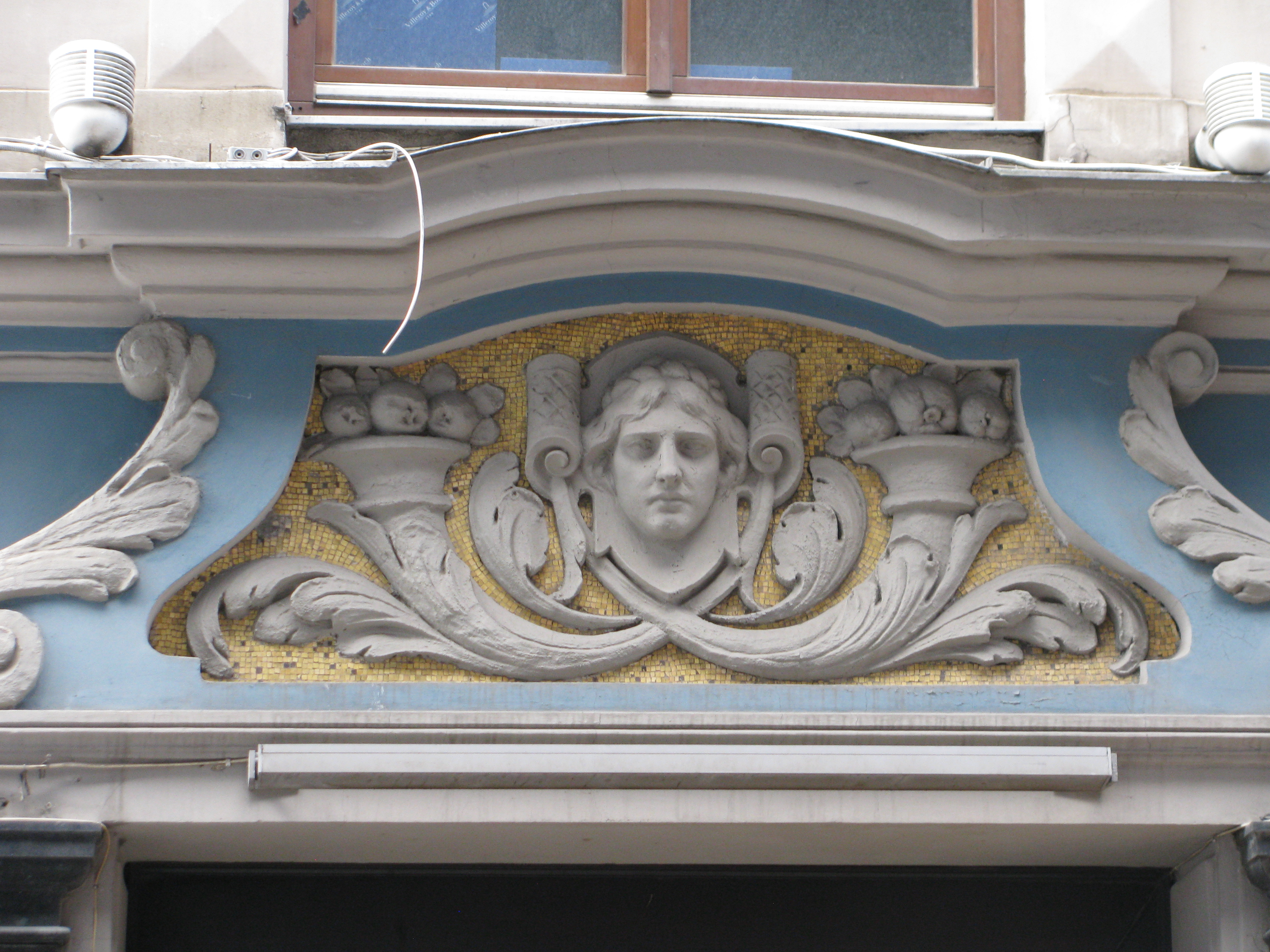
Number 11 - bank building erected in 18th-19th century by architect Christoph Haberland; later reconstructed by Konstantīns Pēkšēns in 1902 and in 1998 by Visvaldis Sarma;

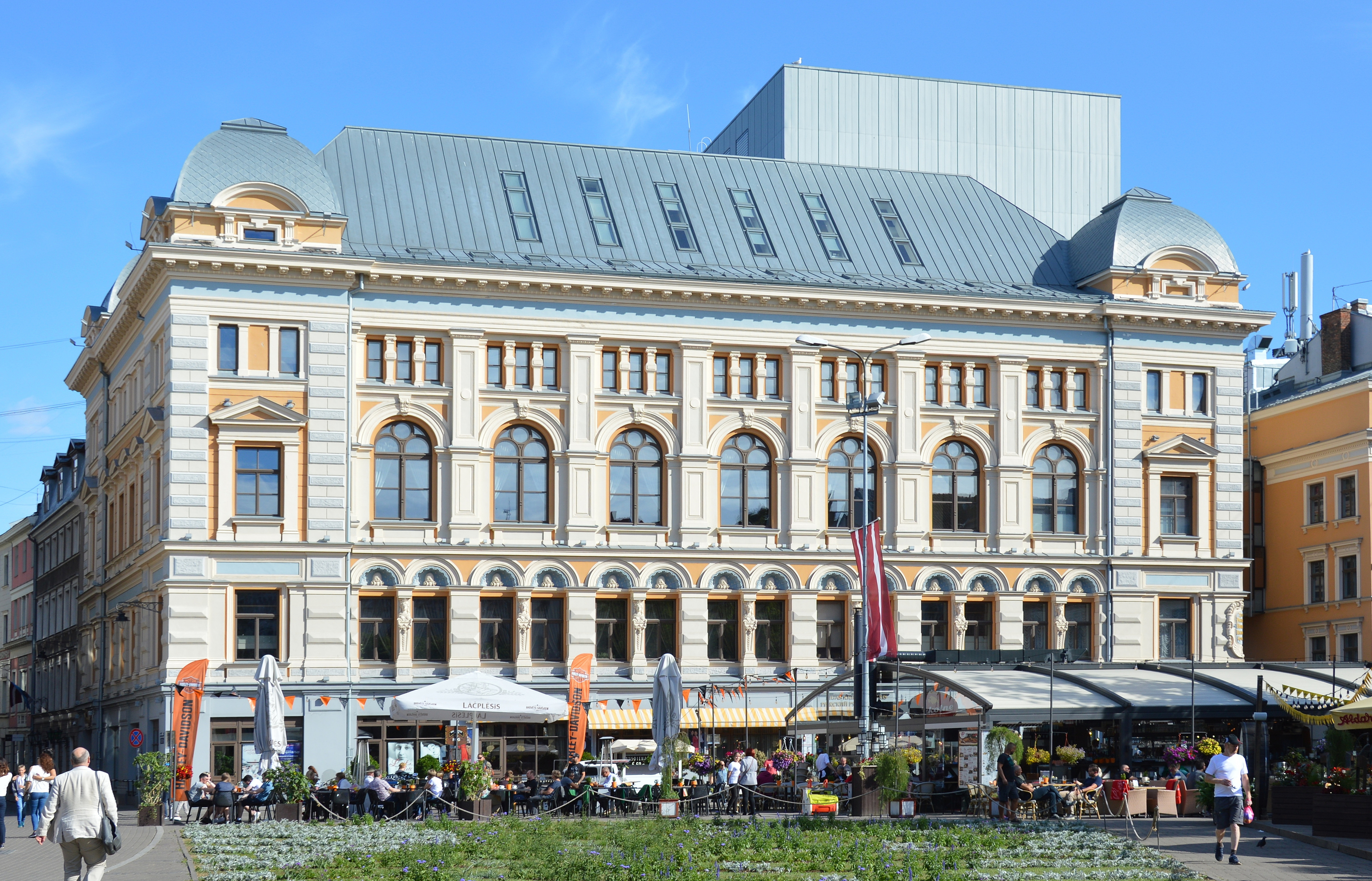
Number 16 - the Mikhail Chekhov Russian Theatre of Riga, founded in 1883, the oldest Russian-language drama theatre outside Russia;

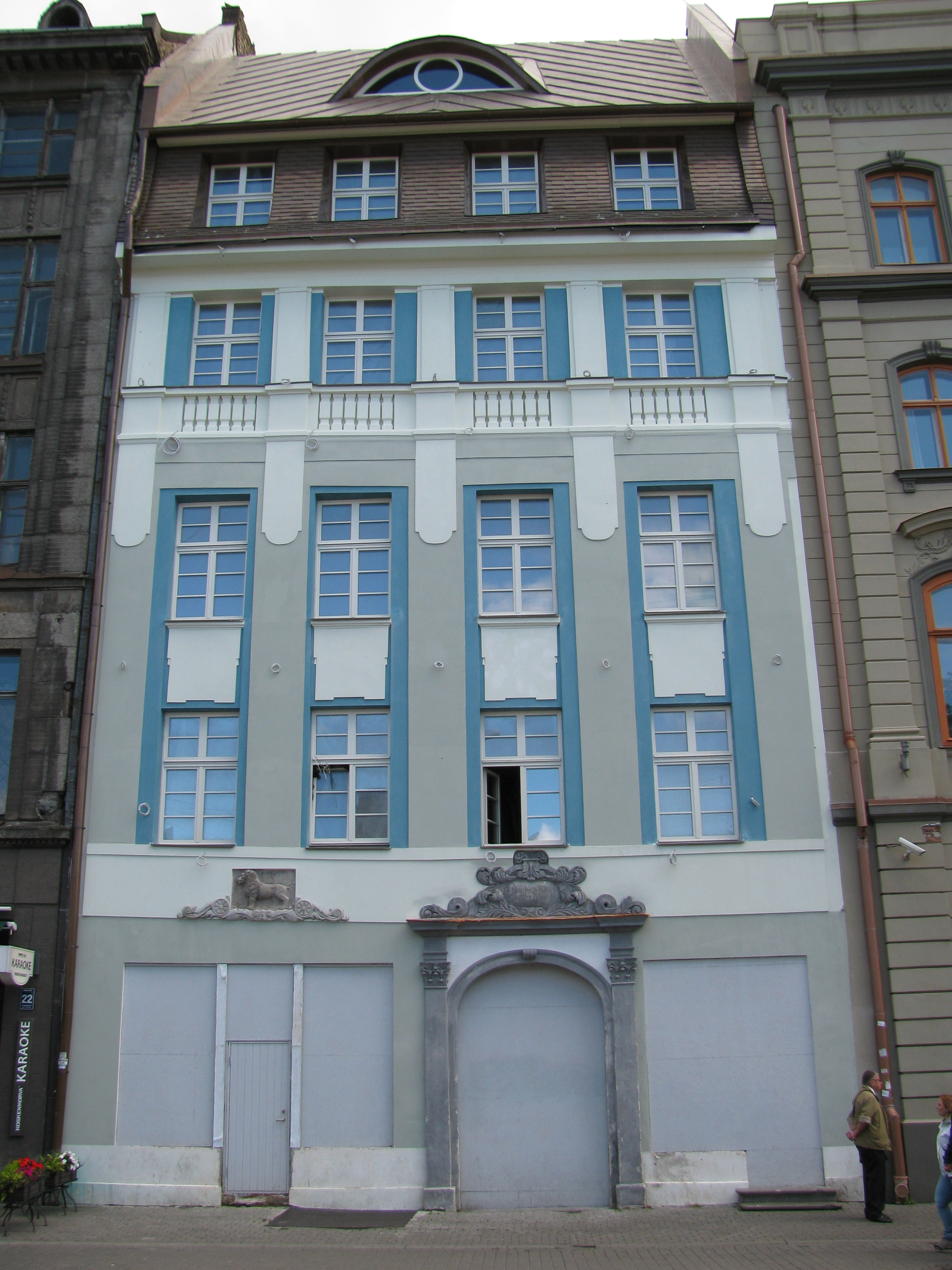
Number 20 - Lauvas Aptieka (Lion pharmacy), formerly the oldest pharmacy in Riga founded in 1653.
- Number 6 - The Chimneysweeper House, built in the 18th century, later rebuilt in 1896 by architect Wilhelm Bockslaff and in 2004;
