= Vērmane Garden =

Garden in Riga, Latvia

Coordinates: 56.9517151°N 24.1185951°E

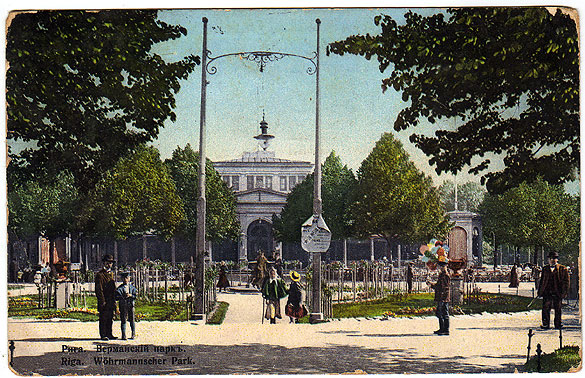
Picture postcard dated 1913 depicting the entrance to the rose garden

Vērmane Garden (Latvian: Vērmanes dārzs, German: Wöhrmanns Garten) is the oldest public garden in the city of Riga, Latvia, and currently comprises an area of approximately 5 hectares (12 acres). The current name is a Latvian transliteration of the garden's original German name.

== Wöhrmann Park ==
Vērmane Garden was originally created as Wöhrmann Park in 1814 on behalf of the Governor General of Governorate of Livonia Philip Paulucci, just a couple of years after the outskirts of Riga was burned down during the French invasion of Russia prior to the Siege of Riga. Financing and land for the park was sponsored by the Prussian Consul General to Riga Johann Christoph Wöhrmann (1784–1843) and his mother Anna Gertrud Wöhrmann (née Abels, 1750–1827).

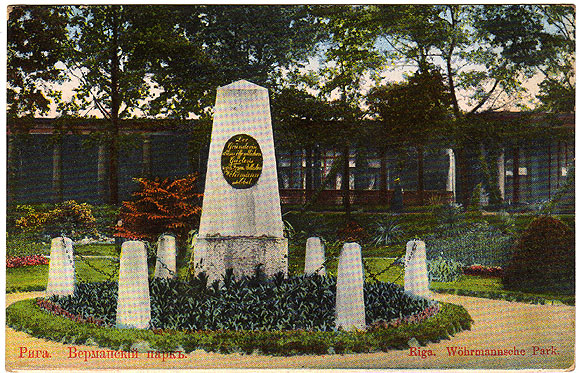
The Anna Wöhrmann Memorial depicted on a vintage picture postcard

Wöhrmann Park was inaugurated with festivities on 8 June 1817 as a fenced 0.8 hectares (2.0 acres) park with exotic trees, a rose garden and restaurant. A granite obelisk was erected 1829 in the park as a posthumous memorial to Anna Wöhrmann. The memorial was dismantled prior to World War II and recreated 2000.

1836 the Riga Chemist and Pharmacist Society initiated a mineral water shop in the park restaurant. When the premises became too narrow, reconstructions were conducted according to a project by architect Heinrich Scheel in the years from 1863 to 1864 and 1870 to 1871. 1869 the park had a sundial and fountain installed.

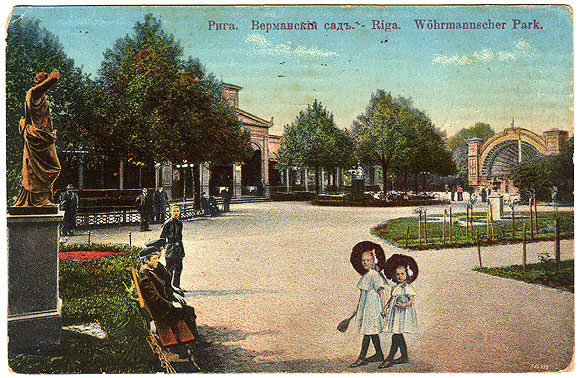
Picture postcard dated 1911 showing view of daily life in the garden

== Park becomes Garden ==
1881, the director of the Riga City Gardens and Parks Georg Kuphaldt expanded the park territory considerably by transferring areas of city squares and the front part of the bordering territory belonging to the Greek Orthodox Seminary. In the newly expanded garden, Kuphaldt installed flower parterres and exotic trees and bushes such as: Gleditschia triacanthos (Honey locust), Dimorphantus mandschuricus Maxim (Japanese angelica tree), Aesculus rubicunda Lois, Fagus silvatica (Copper beech), Fagus asplenifolia (Fernleaf European beech), Fagus folis atropurpureis, Acer negundo (American maple), Acer negundo foliis variegatis, Robinia pseudoacacia (Black locust), Magnolia obovata (Japanese bigleaf magnolia), Magnolia yulan (Lily tree), Bignonia catalpa (Herb linn), Pterocarya caucasica (Caucasian wingnut), Prunus laurocerasus (Cherry laurel), Aucuba japonica (Spotted laurel), Buxus sempervirens (European box), Buxus arborescens (Boxwood tree), Ilex aquifolium (European holly), Ilex laurifolia, Berberis aquifolium (Oregon grape), Rhododendron catawbiense, Yucca filamentosa (Adam's needle yucca), Hedera helix (Common ivy).
