= Sigismunds Vidbergs =

Latvian artist

Sigismunds Vidbergs (1890, Jelgava – 1970, River Edge, New Jersey) was a Latvian artist.

== Biography ==
Sigismunds Vidbergs came from an upper middle class family in Jelgava, where his father was a civil servant. He was encouraged to study art by his art teacher in school, and was introduced by him to the atelier of Johann Walter-Kurau. He then pursued art studies at the present-day Saint Petersburg Art and Industry Academy. He participated in an exhibition of Latvian artists in Riga in 1913, and in 1915 obtained his diploma from the academy. Subsequently, he received a scholarship intended to let him travel abroad to pursue further art studies, but the outbreak of World War I made it impossible. Instead, he spent the war teaching art and continuing his studies. After the Latvian War of Independence he returned to his native country, and in 1921 an exhibition was held with the works of Vidbergs in Latvia. During the first period of Latvian independence, the art of Vidbergs was well received and several exhibitions were made both in Latvia and abroad. He became a prominent member of the cultural life in Latvia, active as an art teacher, editor of an art magazine, chairman of the graphic artists' society, and he also held several positions at the Latvian National Museum of Art. Following the second occupation of Latvia by the Soviet Union, Vidbergs fled the country and eventually settled in the United States.

== Art ==
Already at the academy, Vidbergs came to specialise in stained glass and painting on glass, as well as graphic arts. Stylistically, he was early on influenced by Félix Vallotton and much of his graphic art displays similarities with the works of Aubrey Beardsley. He was an exponent of Erotic art and has been described as one of the finest graphic artists in Latvia during the first half of the 20th century.

== Bibliography ==
- Bērziņa, Marita (2015). Sigismunds Vidbergs. Riga: Neputns. ISBN 978-9934-512-55-1.
