= List of museums in Latvia =

Many of the museums in Latvia are located in the capital, Riga.

== Riga ==
- Andrejs Upits' Memorial Museum
- Arsenāls - Fine Arts Museum
- Art Museum Riga Bourse
- Latvian Firefighting Museum
- Jānis Akuraters Museum in Āgenskalns
- Krišjānis Barons Memorial Museum
- Lattelecom Museum of Telecommunication
- The Ethnographic Open-Air Museum of Latvia
- Latvian Museum of Architecture
- Latvian Museum of Decorative Arts and Design
- Latvian Museum of National History
- Natural History Museum of Latvia
- Latvian Museum of Pharmacy
- Latvian Museum of Photography
- Latvian Railway History Museum
- Latvian National Museum of Art
- Latvian War Museum
- Museum of Barricades of 1991
- Museum of Latvian Television
- Museum of the History of Riga and Navigation
- Museum of the Occupation of Latvia
- Museum “Jews in Latvia”
- Museum of the Popular Front
- Magic and Theater Museum
- Ojārs Vācietis Memorial Museum
- Pauls Stradins Museum of the History of Medicine
- Riga Aviation Museum
- Riga Film Museum
- Riga Motor Museum
- Riga Porcelain Museum

== Other places ==
- Andrejs Pumpurs Museum in Lielvārde
- Ernst Glück Bible Museum in Alūksne
- Jēkabpils Museum of History
- Liepāja Museum
- Kuldīga district museum
- Tukums Museum
- Turaida Museum Reserve
- Ventspils Museum

== See also ==
- Latvian Museums Association
