= Art Museum Riga Bourse =

Art museum in Riga, Latvia

- Mākslas muzejs Rīgas Birža
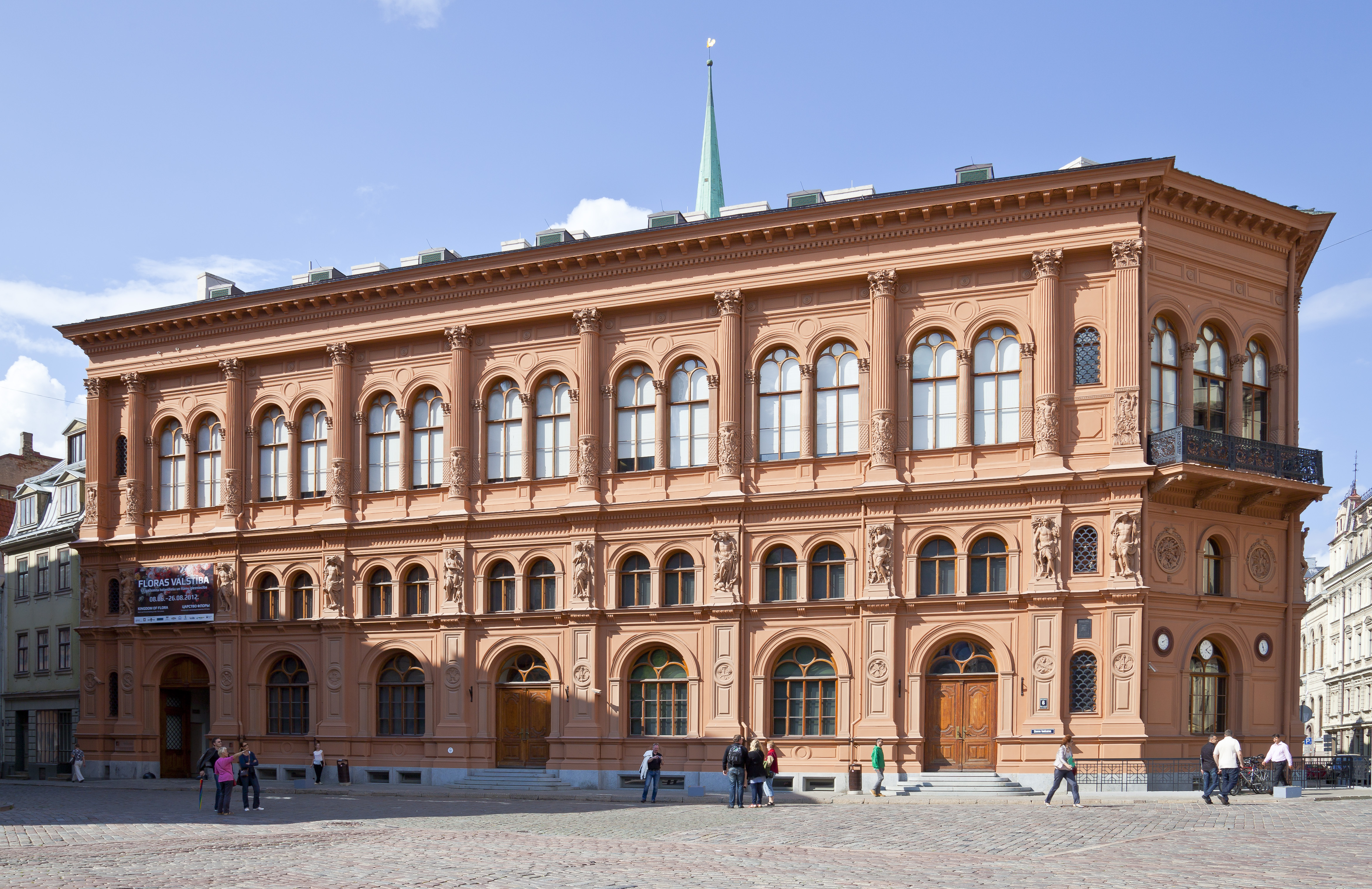
- Riga Bourse from the Dome square
- Interactive fullscreen map
- Former name: Latvian Museum of Foreign Art
- Established: 1920
- Location: Vecrīga, Riga, Latvia
- Coordinates: 56°56′59″N 24°06′22″E
- Type: Art museum
- Architect: Harald Julius von Bosse
- Owner: Latvian National Museum of Art
- Website: lnmm.gov.lv/en/art-museum-riga-bourse

Art Museum Riga Bourse (Latvian: Mākslas muzejs Rīgas Birža) is a museum in Riga, Latvia. It was established in 1920 and contains the most extensive collection of world art in Latvia. Its permanent exhibits feature art ranging in time from Ancient Egyptian art dating back thousands of years to Asian art down to the 21st century.

== History ==
=== Building ===
The museum is housed in the city's historic stock exchange building which dates back to the first half of the 19th century when the Great Guild of Riga decided to leave its offices in City Hall. The plan was to build a new building that would contain the Guild itself, the Stock Exchange Committee and a municipal theatre.

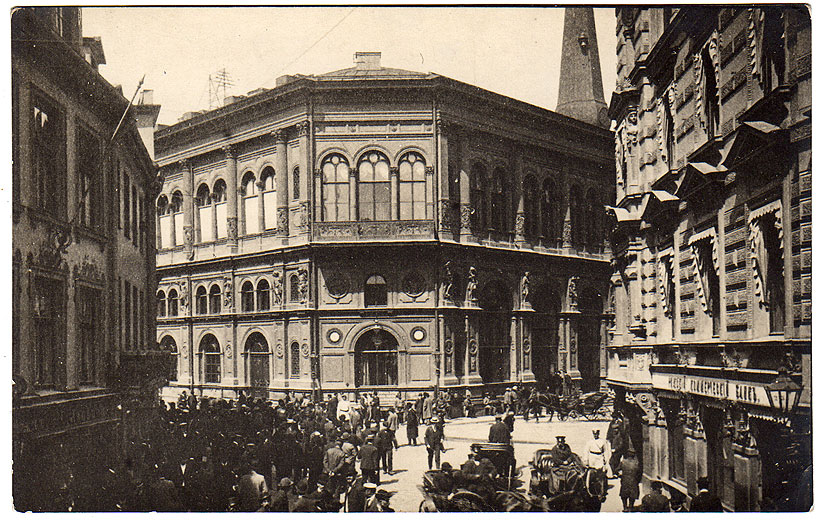
Riga stock exchange in the 1910s

The architect was Harald Julius von Bosse, who proposed a location in the Old Town and a building that would fit into the existing urban layout Both the location and plan to incorporate a theater were rejected. In 1851, a new location was chosen on the corner of Pils iela, Šķūņu iela and Jēkaba iela. Construction began on 25 March 1852. The building was designed in the Venetian Renaissance palazzo style.

The façade incorporated terracotta sculptures with allegorical content and decorative elements designed by the Danish sculptor David Jensen. On 26 May 1856, the Riga Stock Exchange was ceremonially opened in the presence of the Russian tsar Alexander II.

In 1937, several buildings were demolished to create the Dome square (Doms laukums).

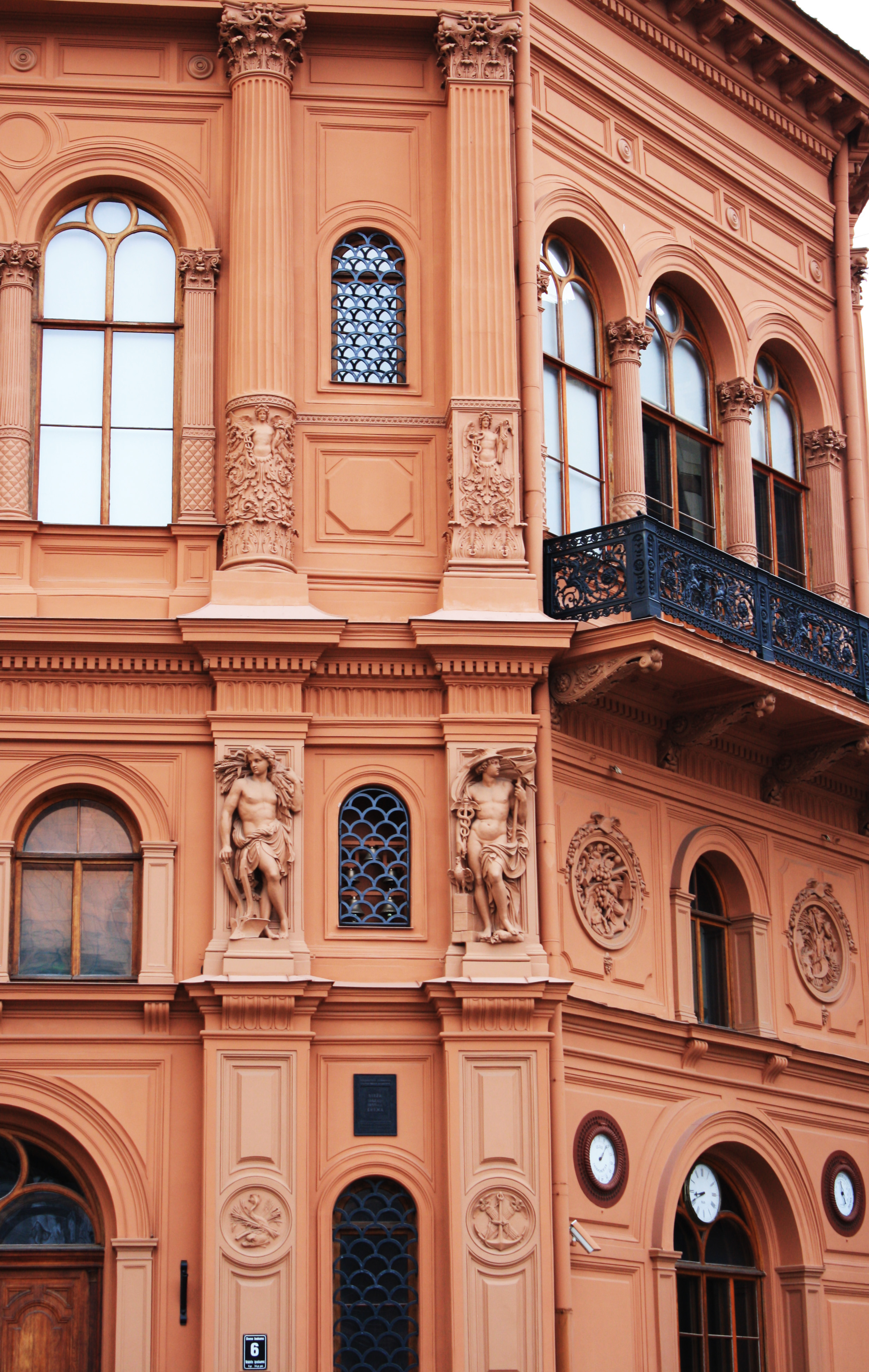
Details of the façade

After the World War II, Latvia became part of the Soviet Union and the building became the House of Science and Technology Propaganda. The façade was repainted in lighter colours (pale pink and brown).

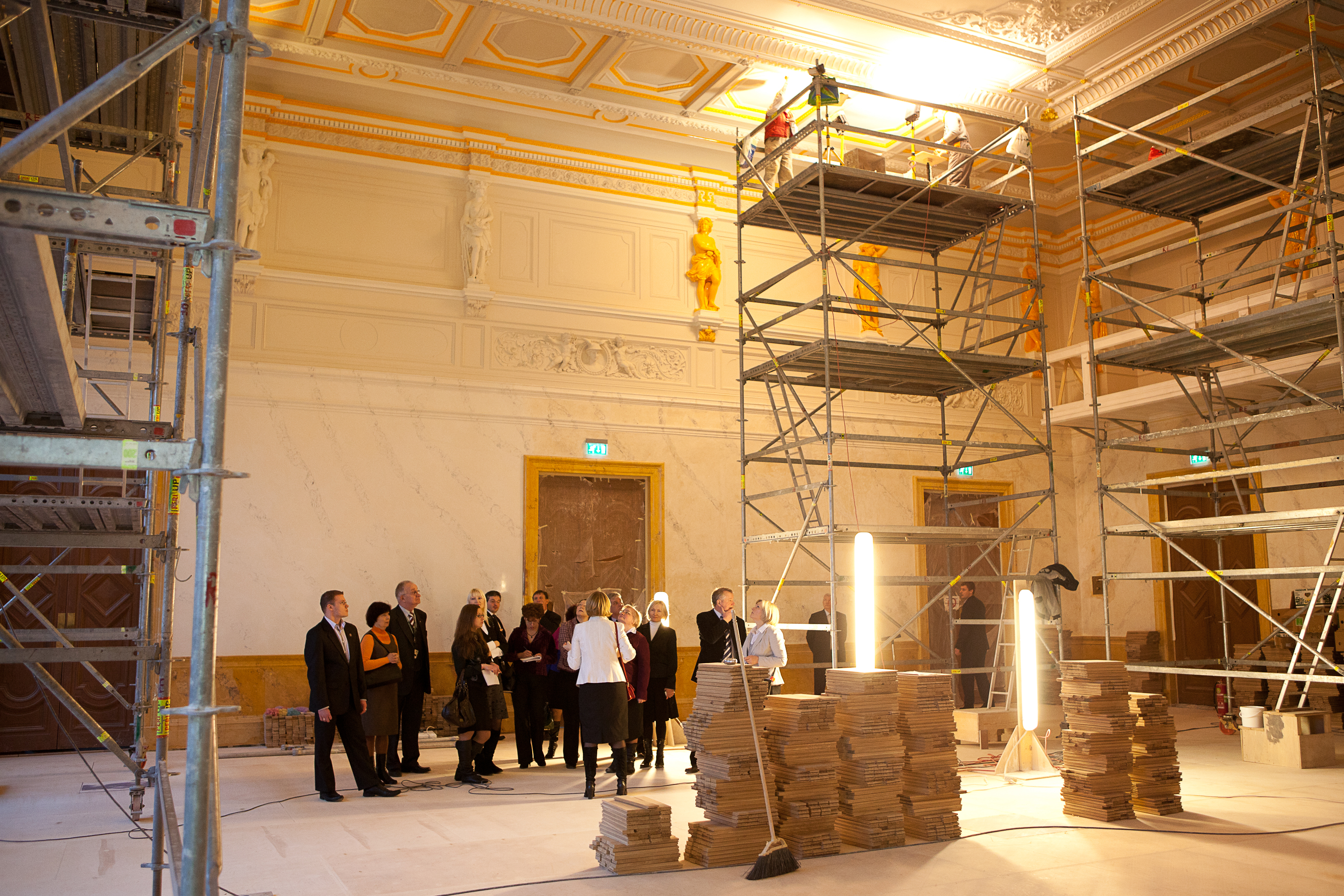
Museum construction in February 2011

On 24 January 1980, a fire broke out on the upper floor halls. Reconstruction began several months later but stopped in 1982 without completing the work.

On 30 September 2004, renovations were scheduled to continue but work only began in 2008. On 20 August 2011, the building officially opened as an art museum.

=== Collections ===
The collections of the Art Museum Riga Bourse have been collected by several art collectors during the 19th and the 20th century.

The first private collection that had been given to the city of Riga was Nikolaus von Himsel's (1729–1764). He was a Baltic German doctor and traveler and bought many oriental objects in order to make a Kunstkammer or art cabinet. Then, Domenico de' Robbiani (1793–1889), an Italian merchant settled in Riga, gave his collection of paintings that gathered artworks from the Netherlands, Germany or France. These two collections were merged and the idea of a museum arose.

Because of a lack of space, some paintings were settled in the Mayor's house whose name was Ludiwig Wilhelm Kerkovius (1831–1904). At this time, several collectors gave their collections: Reinhold Schilling (1819–1888) gave 30 paintings and Kerkovius 26 paintings. The most important gift was the Friedrich Wilhelm Brederlo's collection (1779–1862). He gave 201 paintings, 70 of which were made by Dutch masters.

The collection of the museum contains more than 22,000 works of art, dating from the 4th millennium BC to the 20th century.

== Collections ==
=== Paintings ===
- Louis-Léopold Boilly, Portrait of Friedrich Wilhelm Brederlo, oil on canvas.
- Anto Carte, Idole (Révélation), oil, tempera and gouache on canvas, 1932.
- Workshop of Anton van Dyck, Portrait of William II, Prince of Orange-Nassau, oil on canvas, 1632.
- Melchior d'Hondecoeter, Rooster Fight, oil on canvas, 17th century.
- Jacob van Loo, Portrait of a Scientist, oil on canvas, 1647.
- Claude Monet, Winter Landscape (Sandviken), oil on canvas, 1895.
- Niccolò Renieri, Society of Musicians, oil on canvas, 17th century.
- Hubert Robert, The Augustus Temple in Nîmes, oil on canvas, 1783.
- Daniel Seghers et Lucas van Uden, Landscape in a Garland of Flowers, oil on wood, 17th century.
- Bartholomeus Spranger, Adam and Eve, tempera on canvas, 1593–1595.
- Unknown Artist (Frankfurt school), Man with carnation, oil and tempera on wood, early 16th century.

=== Sculptures ===
- Luigi Bienaimé, Bacchante, marble, 1847.
- Antonio Canova, Bust of the Goddess Hebe, marble, 1819.
- Jean-Baptiste Carpeaux, Bust of a Bacchante, bronze, 19th century.
- Lower Rhine School, Saint Catherine, wood, 15th century.
- François Pompon, Bear, on-glazed céramic.
- Auguste Rodin, The Kiss, bronze, 1886.
- Pietro Tenerani, Psyche, marble, middle of the 19th century.
- Viktor Oskar Tilgner, Buste of Hans Makart, bronze, end of the 19th century.

=== Installation Art ===
- Dmitry Gutov, Gondola, 2012.

=== Objets d'Art ===
- Arita Workshops, Plate, porcelaine, émail et engobe, 18th century.
- Cantonese Workshops, Puzzle Ball with Sticks, ivory, 20th century.
- Fabergé Workshops, Bird Carafe, cristal and silver, 19th century.
- Meissen Workshops, Vase Decorated with Snow Balls, porcelain, c. 1740.
- Ernst August Leuteritz (Meissen Workshops), Epergne, porcelain, on-glaze painting, 1886.
- Sèvres Workshops, The Reaper, bisque porcelain, 1757–1766.
- Wedgwood Workshops, Vase with Relief Decoration, stoneware, 19th century.
- India, Elephant, carved ivory, 19th century.
- Indonesia, Wayang Shadow Theatre, wood, batik, cotton and leather, 21st century.

== Gallery ==
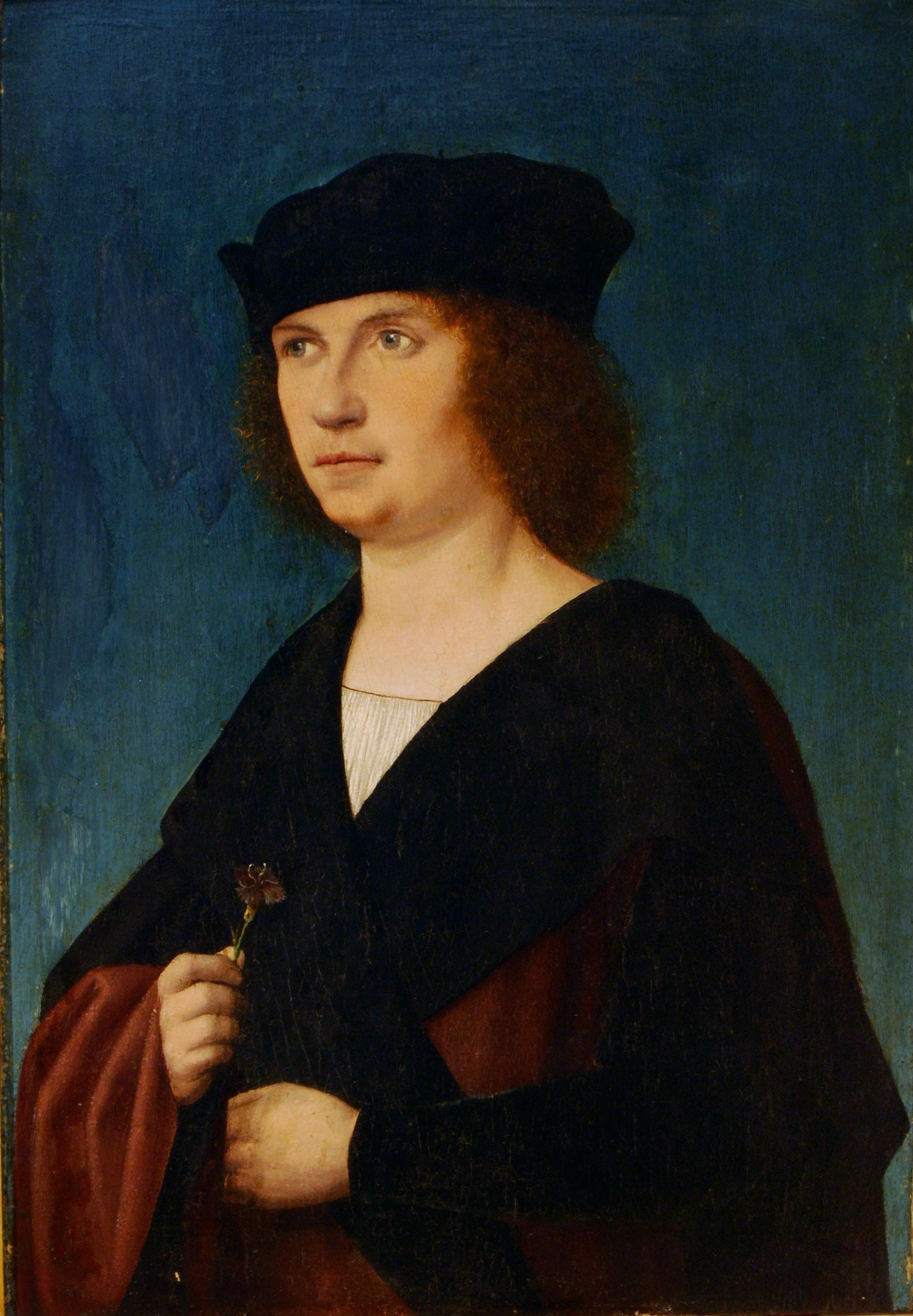
Man with a carnation

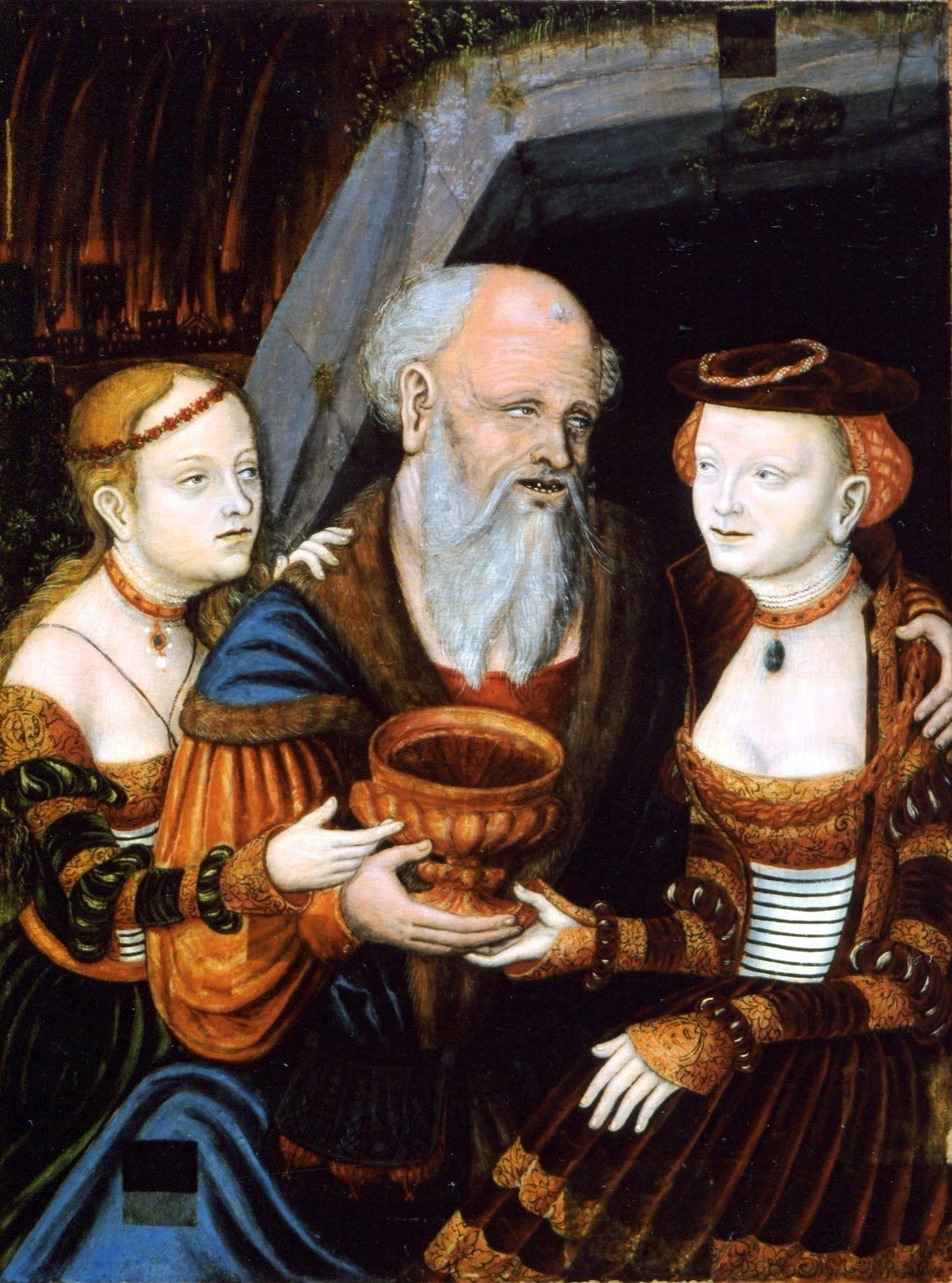
Wolfgang Krodel the Elder, Lot and his daughters, 1500–1561

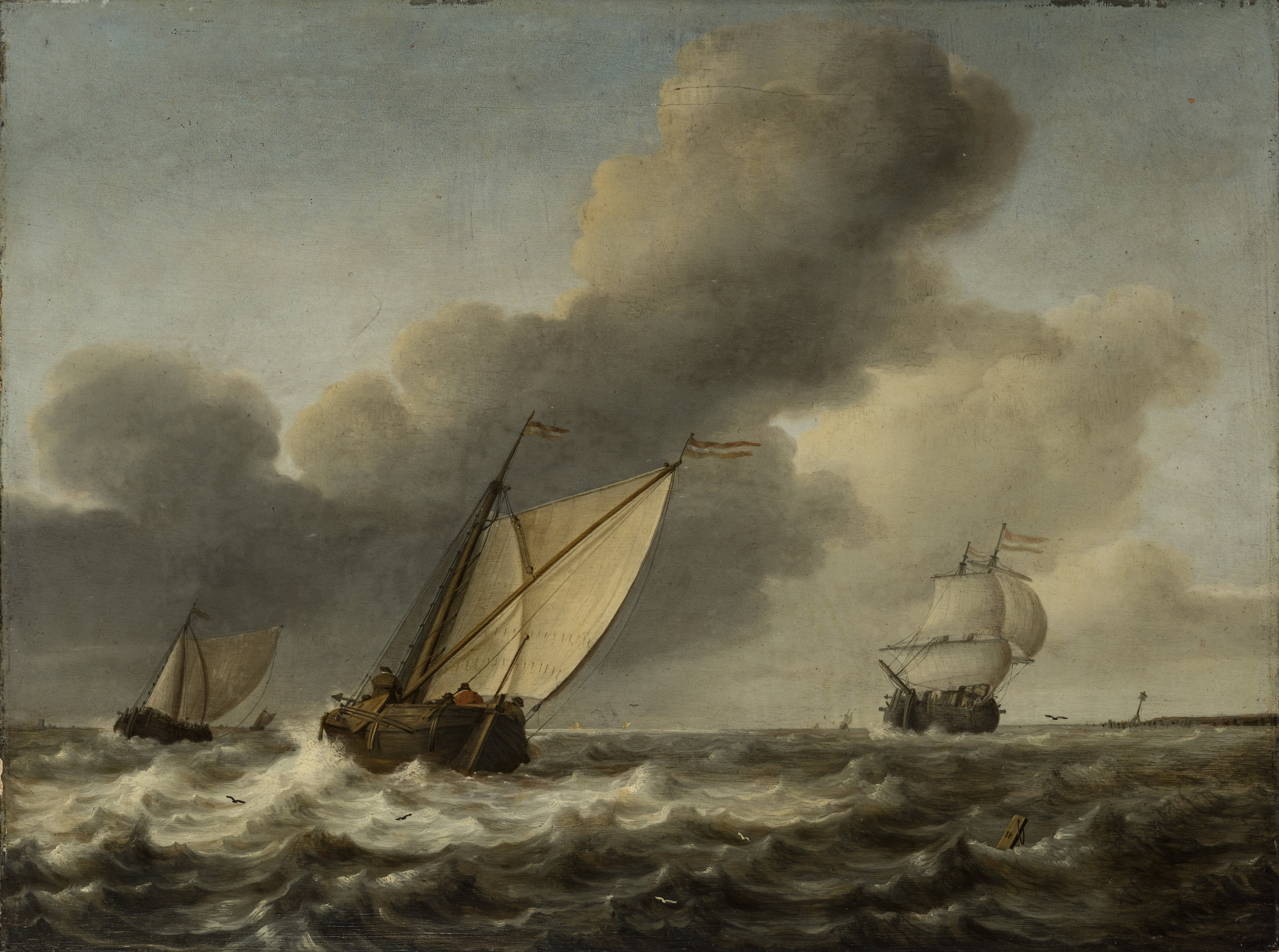
Jan Porcellis, Ships in a Strong Wind, 1600–1632.

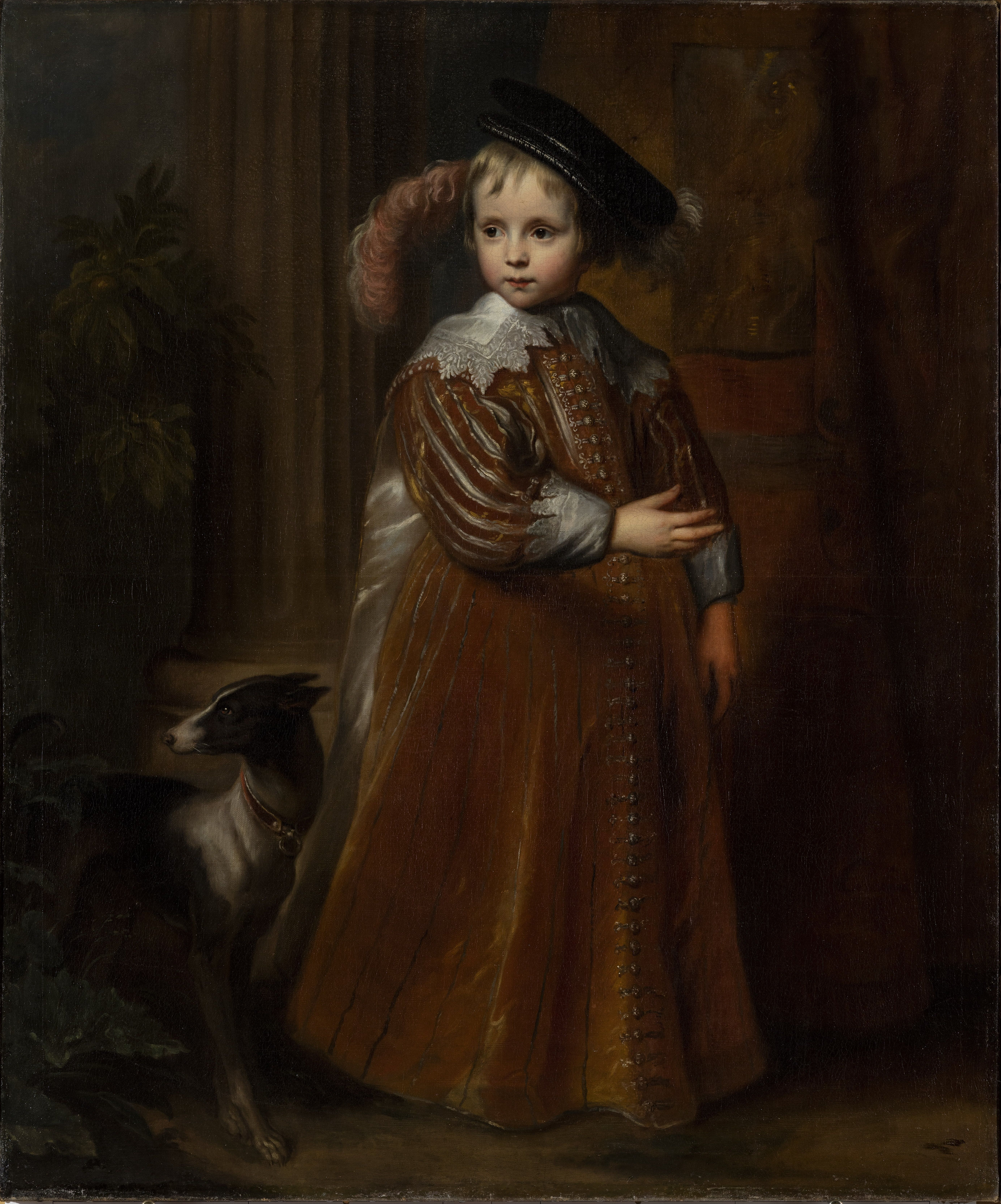
Portrait of William II, Prince of Orange-Nassau, 1632
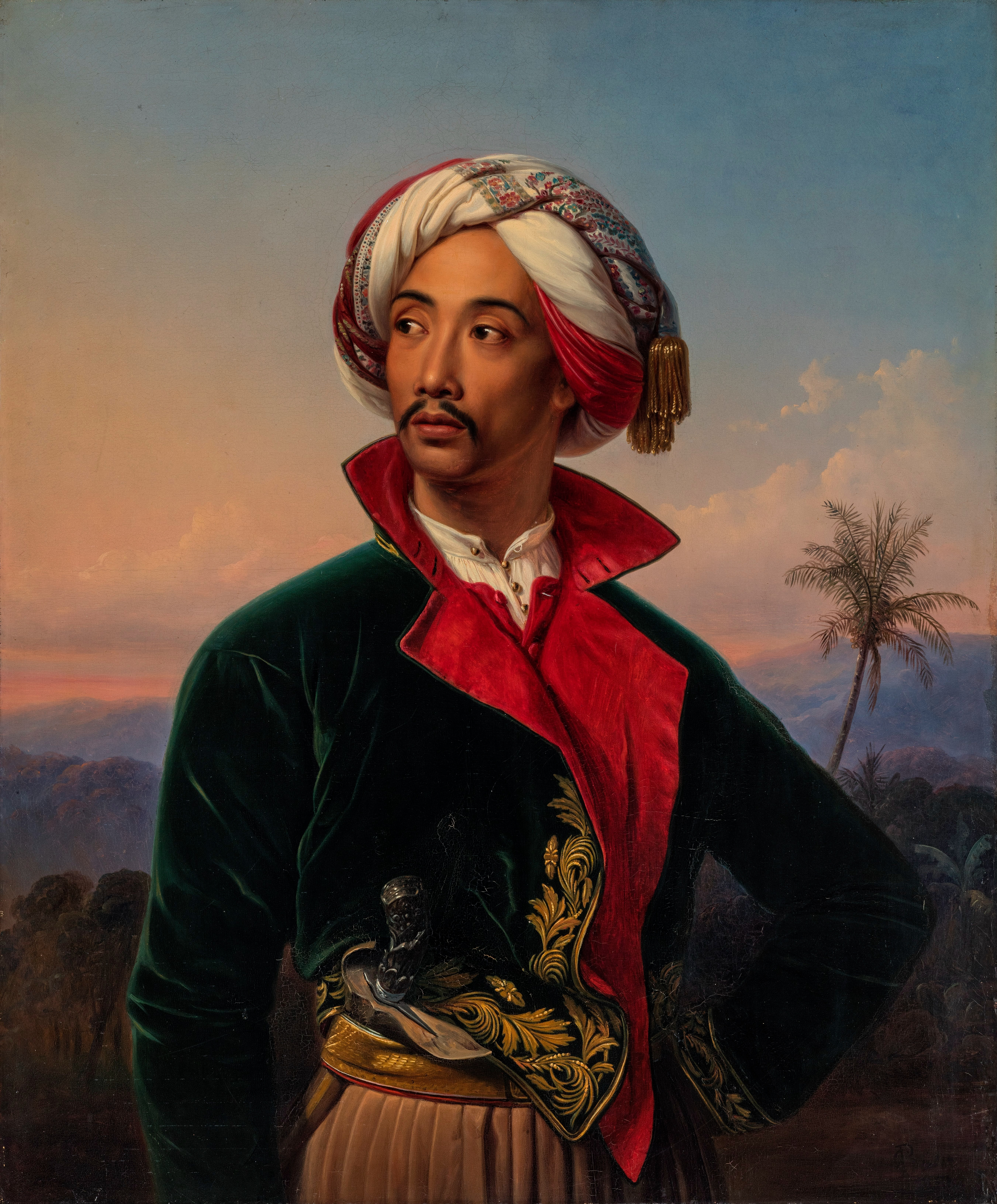
Johann Karl Bähr, Portrait of Raden Saleh, 1841

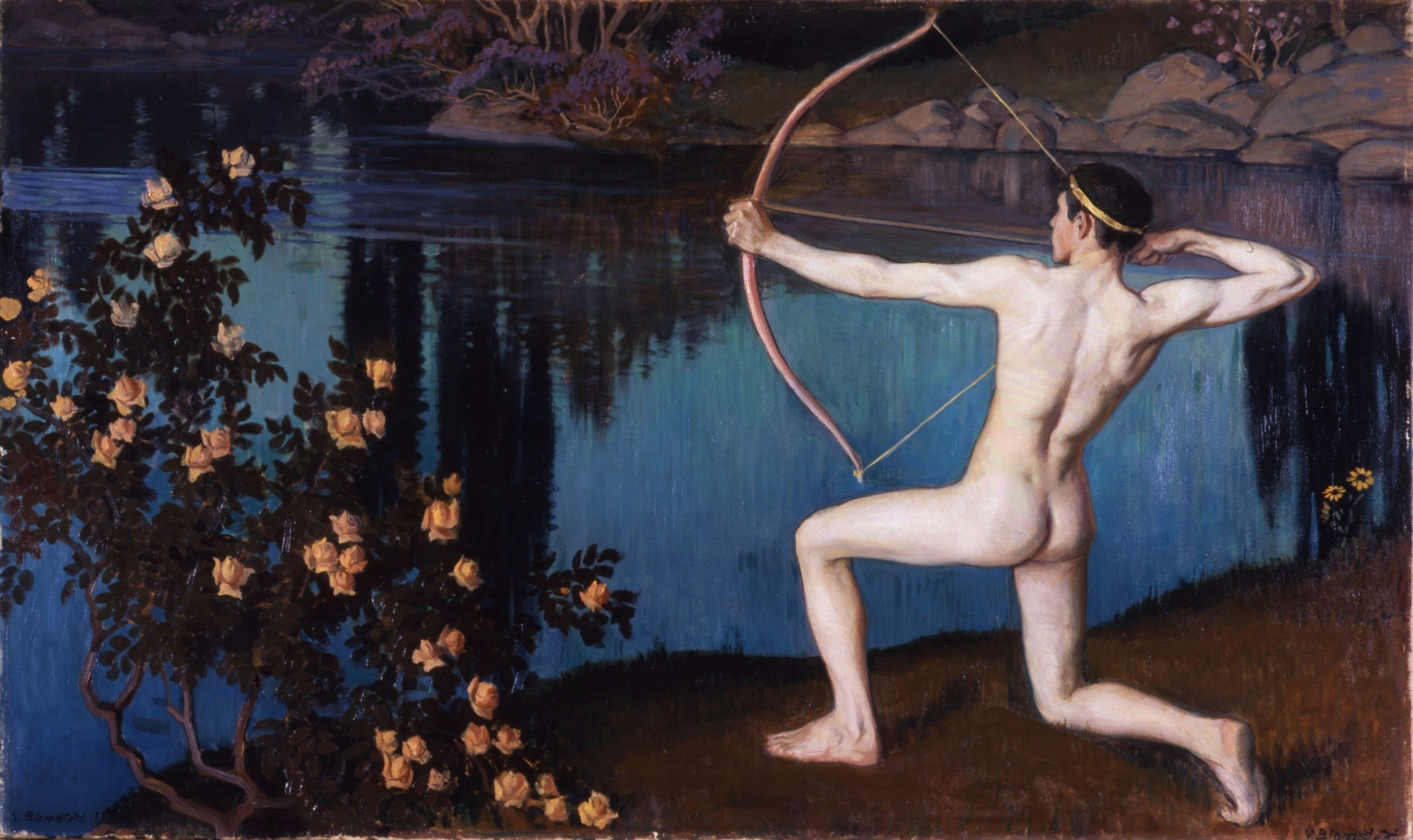
Väinö Blomstedt, The Archer, 1898

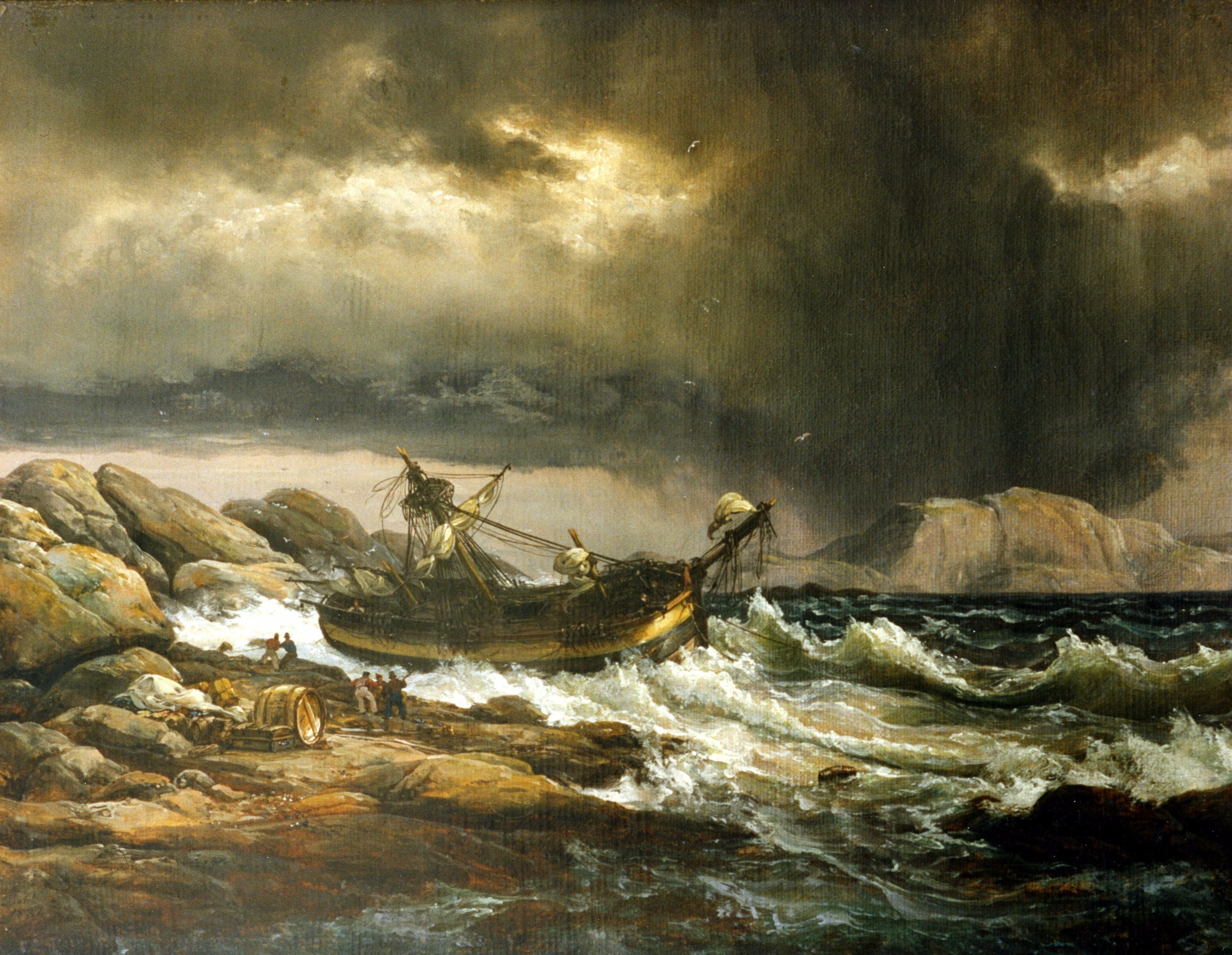
Johan Christian Dahl, Shipwreck, 1832

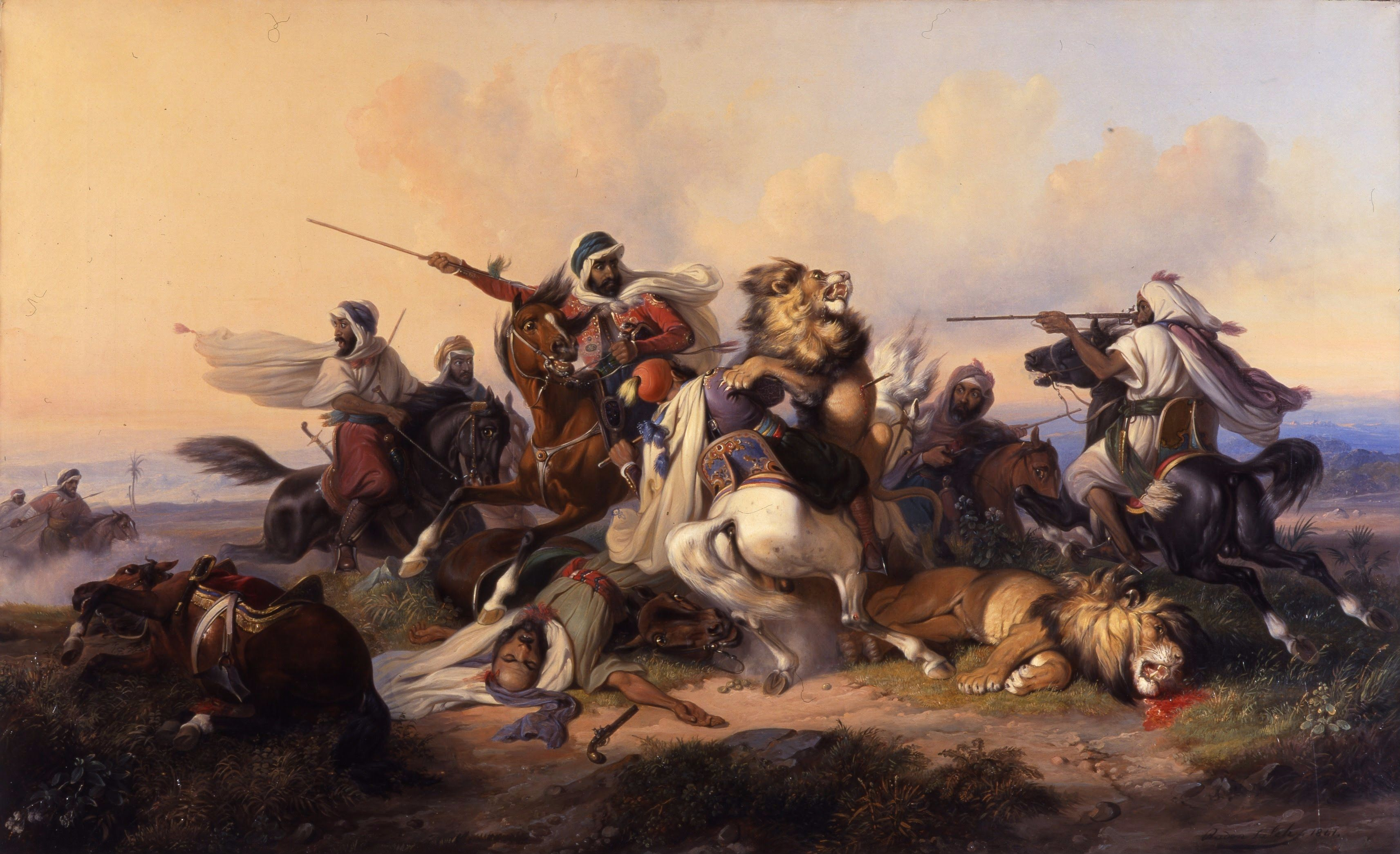
Raden Saleh, Lion hunting, 1841

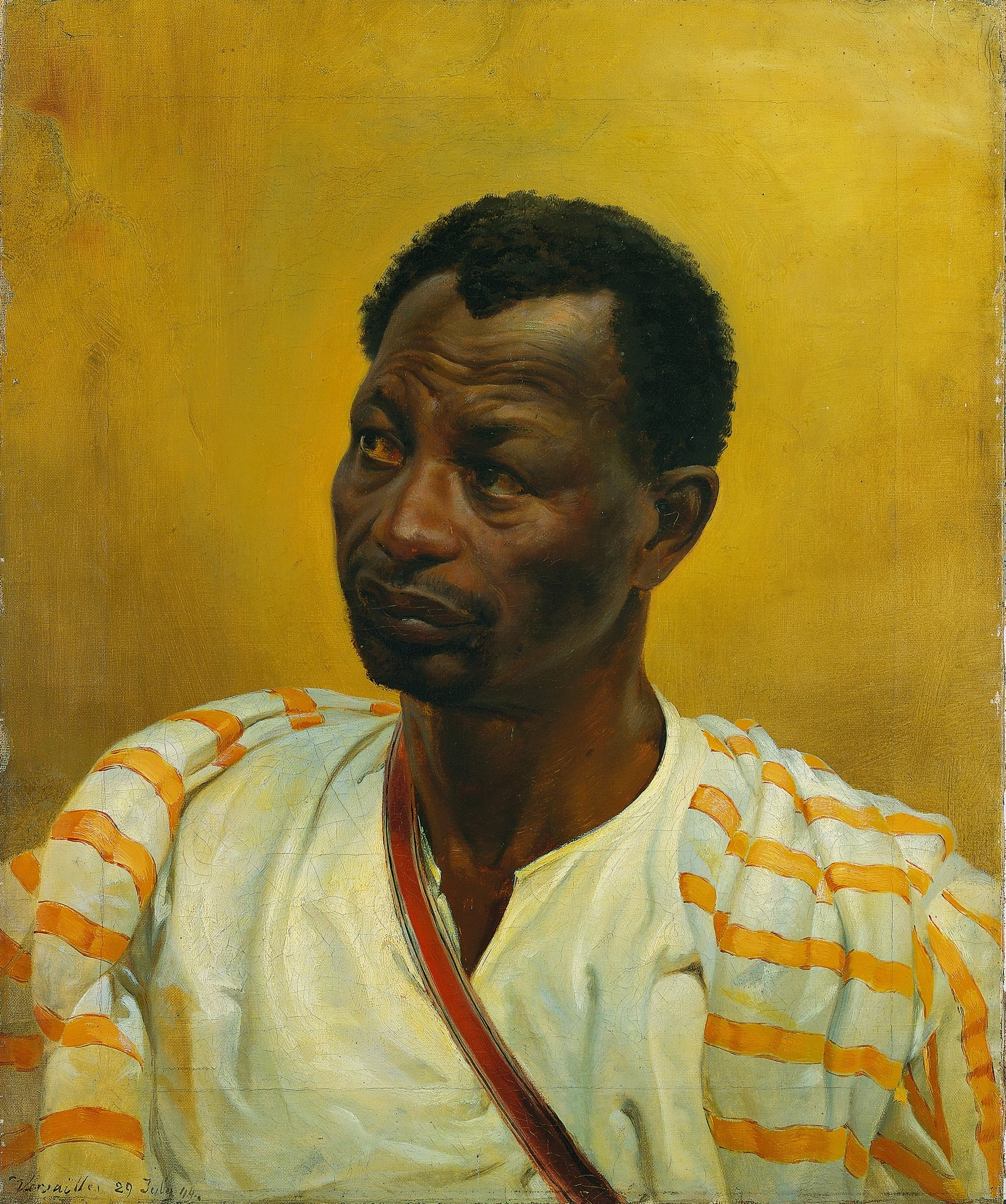
Georg Wilhelm Timm, Portrait of an African, 1844

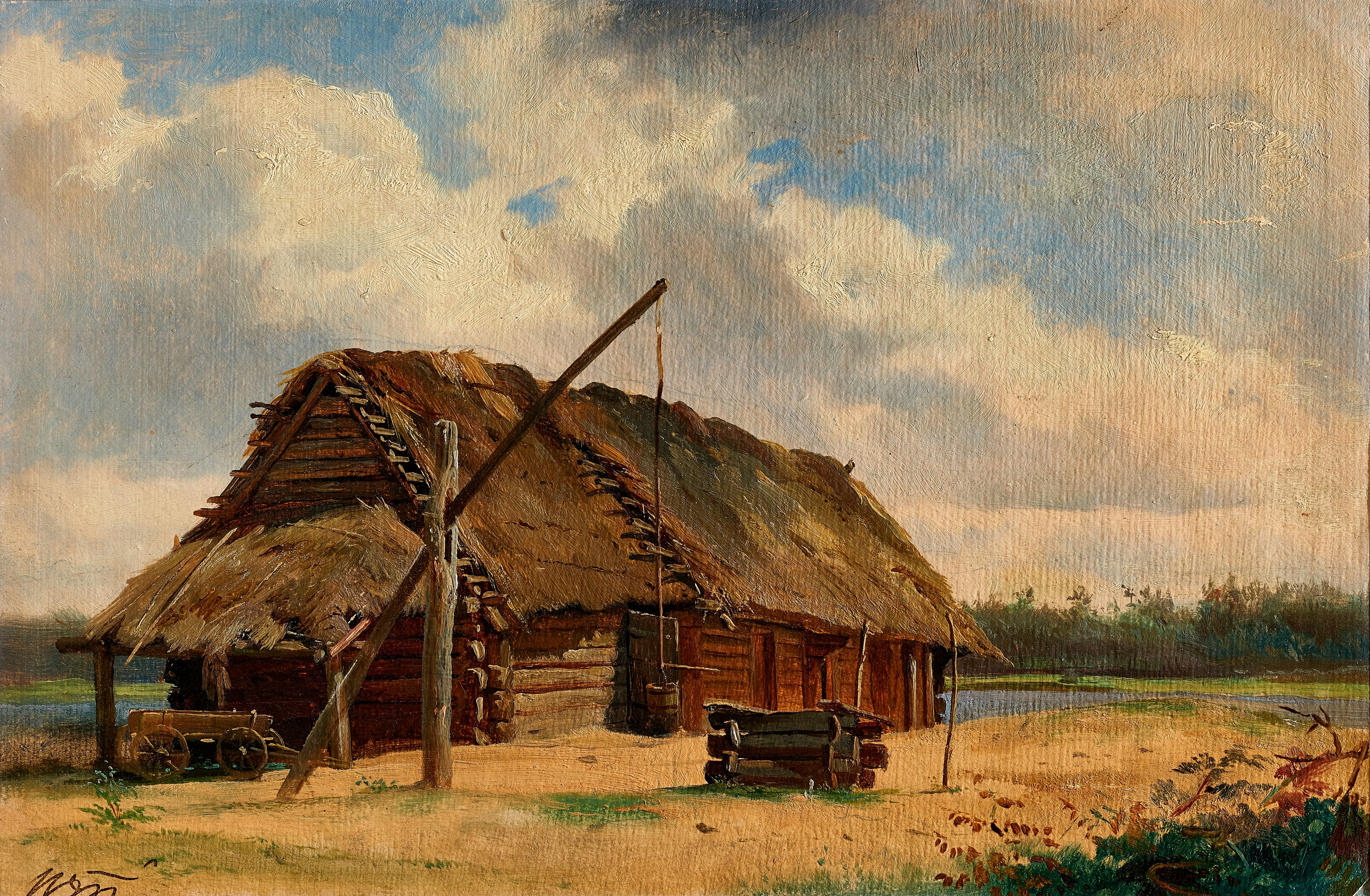
Georg Wilhelm Timm, Seaside coast of Riga, 1848

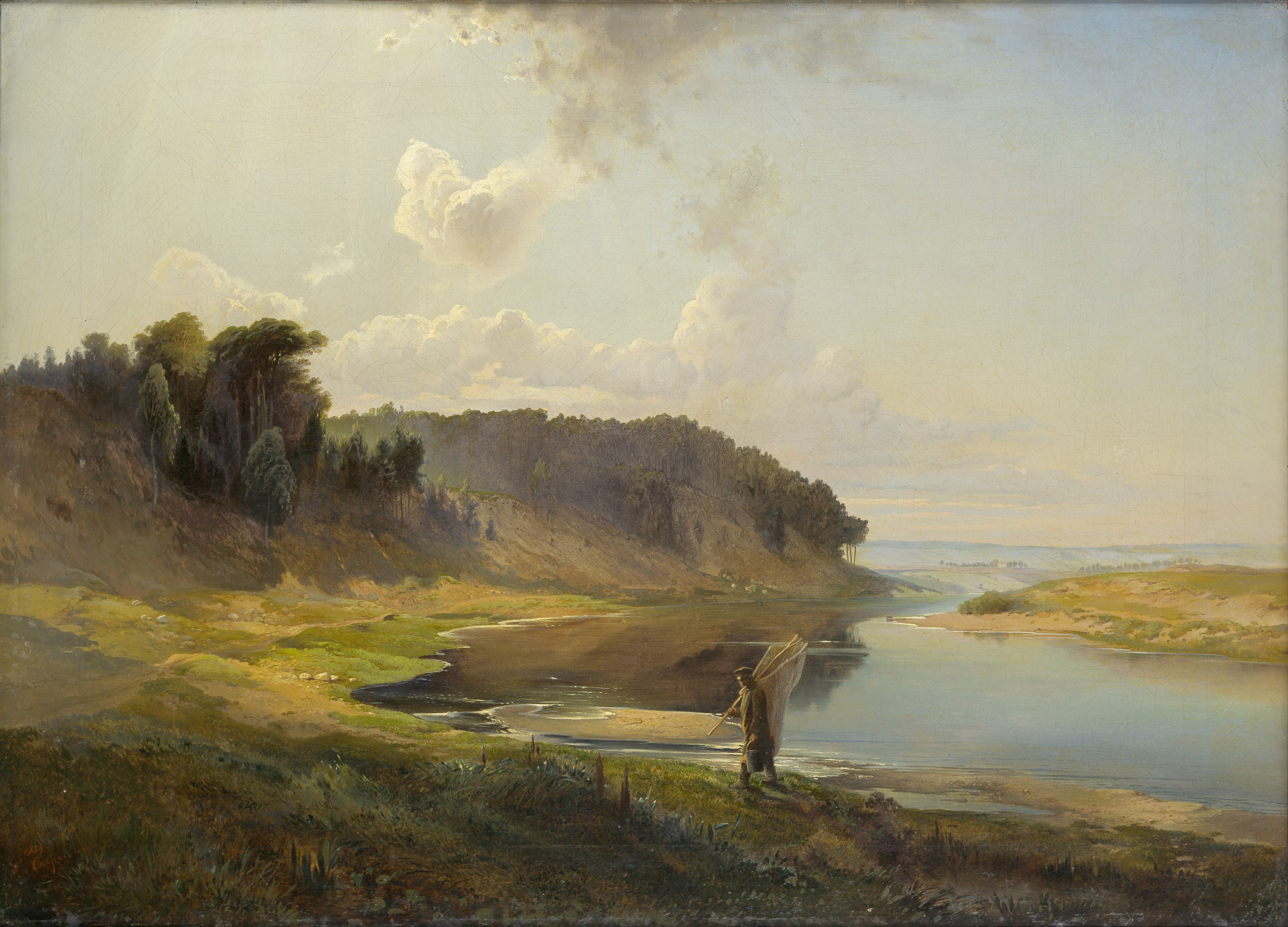
Alexei Savrasov, Landscape with a river and a fisherman, 1859

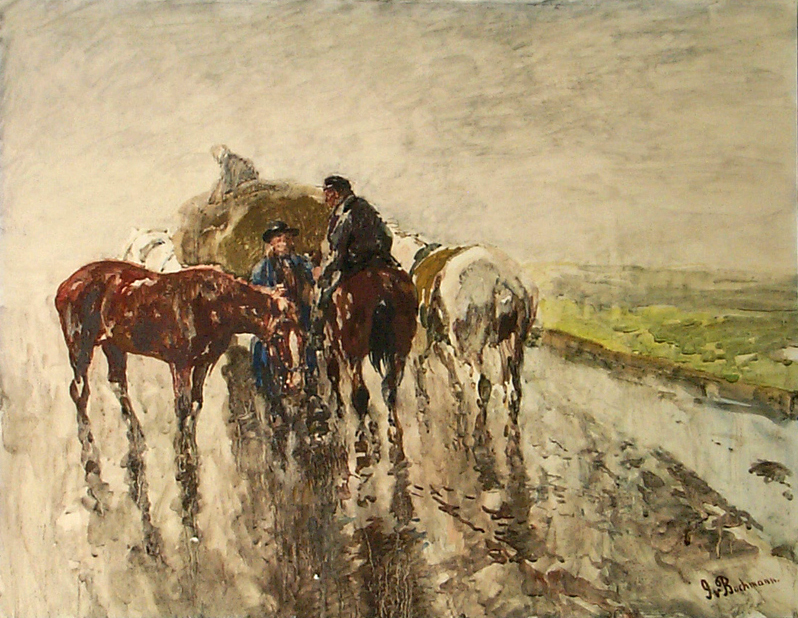
Gregor von Bochmann, Rainy day, 1913
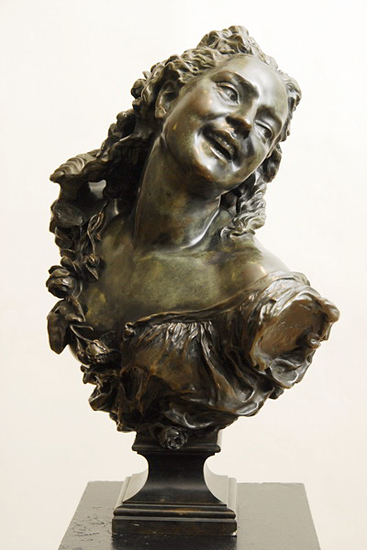
Bust of a Bacchante

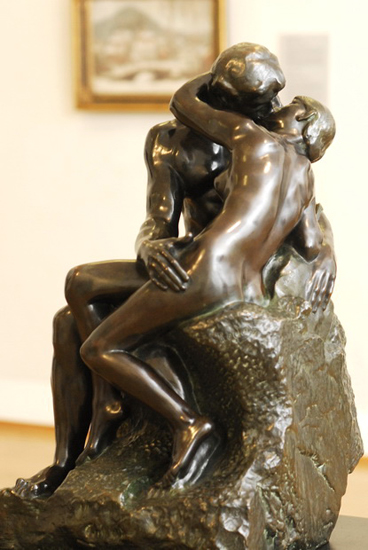
The Kiss

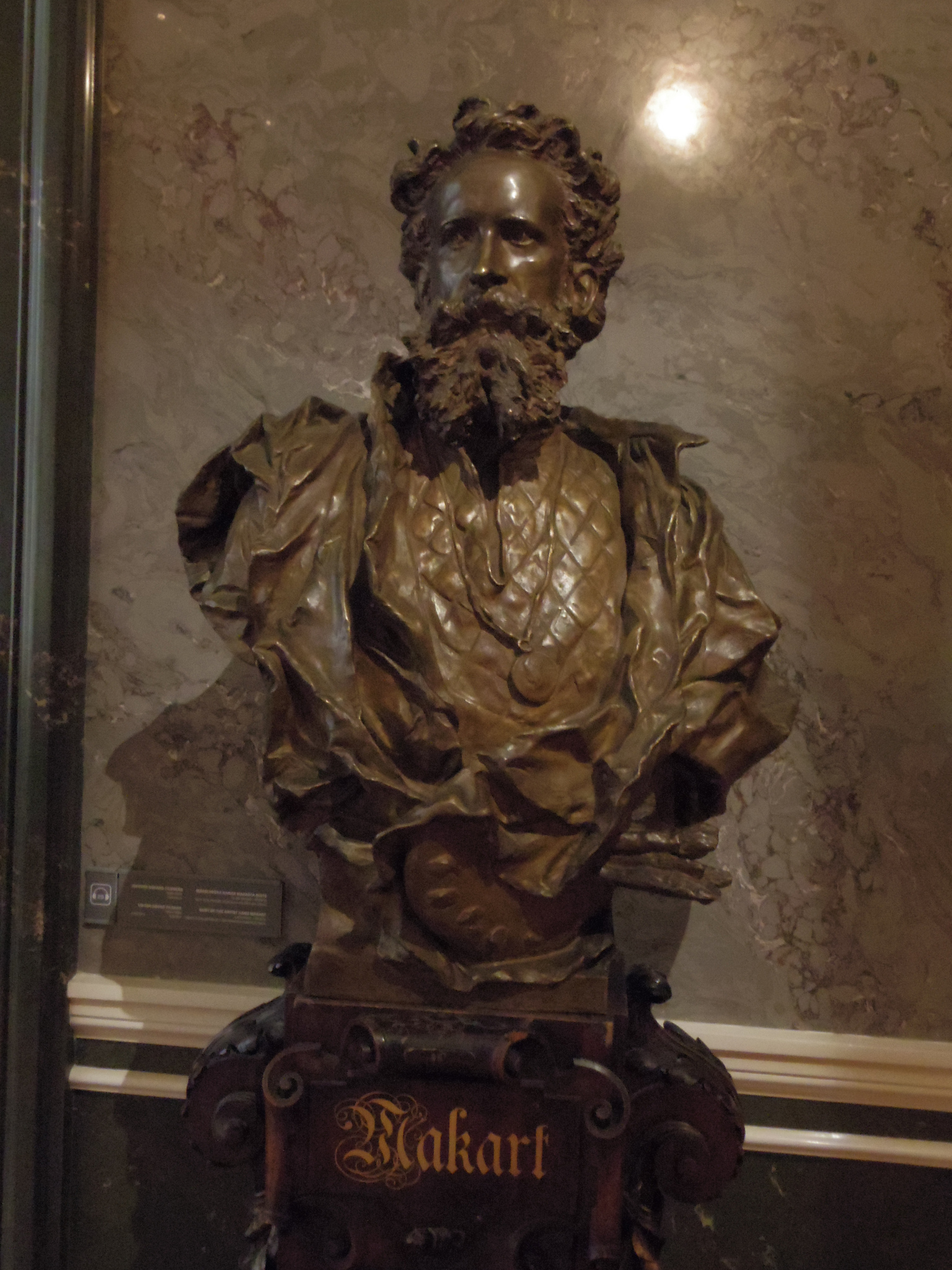
Bust of Hans Makart

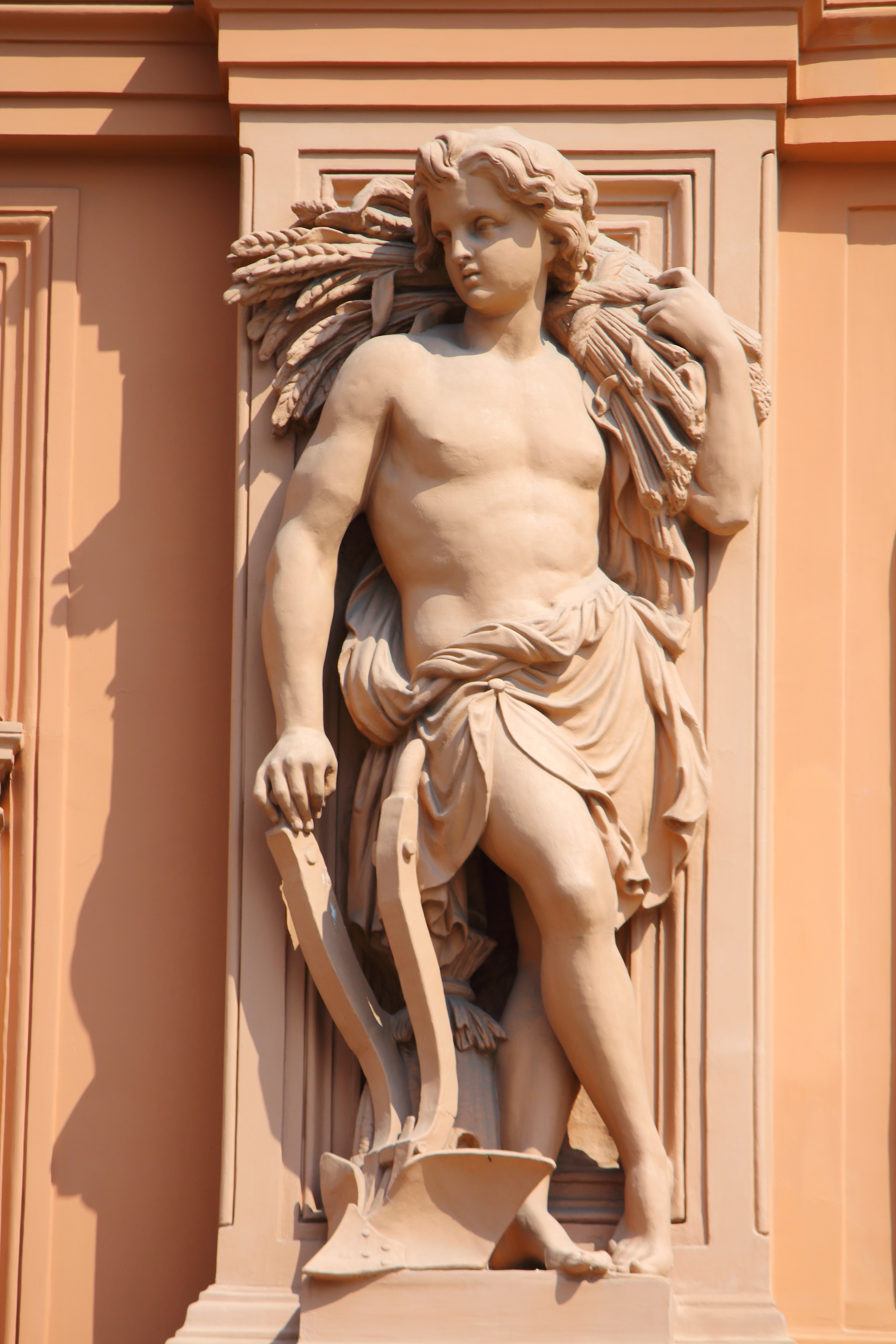
Saturn

== See also ==
- List of museums in Latvia
- Riga Stock Exchange
