= Upīts =

Upīts may refer to:

- Andrejs Upīts (1877–1970), Latvian teacher
- Andrejs Upīts' Memorial Museum
