= Georg Wilhelm Timm =

Russian painter (1820–1895)

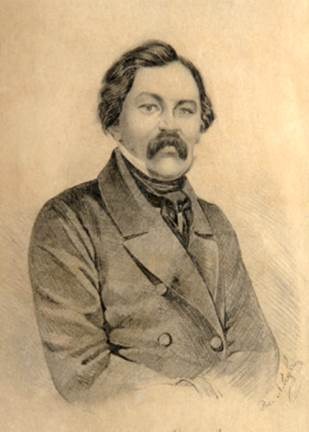
- Engraving by Alexander Lebedev
- Born: 9 June 1820; Riga, Russian Empire
- Died: 7 April 1895 (aged 74); Berlin, German Empire
- Education: Imperial Academy of Arts (1839)
- Known for: Lithography
- Elected: Member Academy of Arts (1844)

Georg Wilhelm Timm, also known as Vasily Fyodorovich Timm (Russian: Васи́лий Фёдорович Ти́мм; 21 June [O.S. 9 June] 1820 – 19 April [O.S. 7 April] 1895), was a Russian painter of Baltic German descent, lithographer and ceramic designer, known for his genre and battle scenes. He was also the publisher of the Russian Art Gazette.

== Biography ==
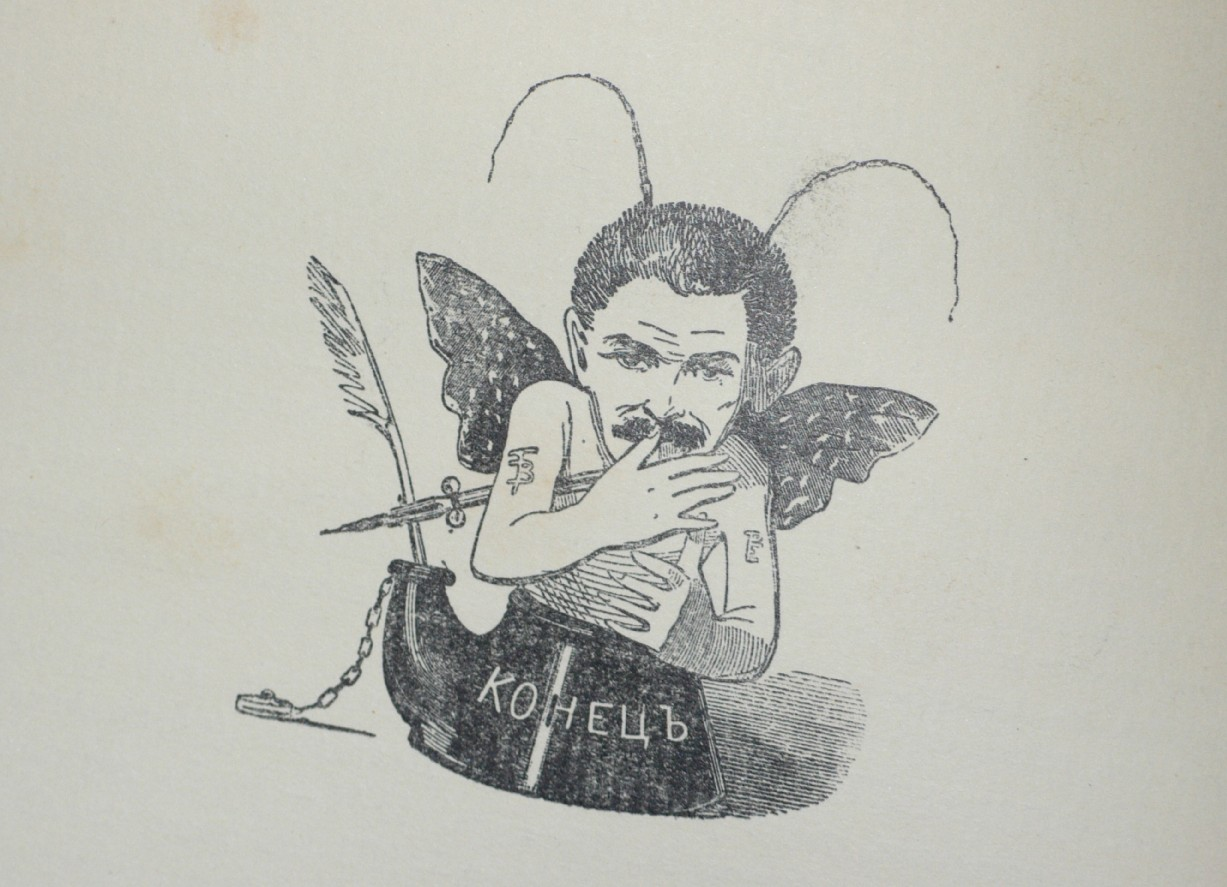
Self-caricature from the endpaper of a book.

Georg Wilhelm Timm was born on 9 June 1820 in Riga. His father, Friedrich Gottfried Timm (1779–1848), was the mayor of Riga. His sister, Emilie, misfortunately married and then divorced the painter Karl Bryullov in 1839. His first art studies were in Riga, then he went to Saint Petersburg, where he enrolled as a "foreign student" at the Imperial Academy of Arts. His primary instructor there was the battle painter, Alexander Sauerweid.

He was awarded two silver medals and graduated in 1839 with the title of "Artist". Five years later, thanks to an Imperial scholarship, he went to Paris where he worked under the direction of Horace Vernet, also a battle painter, and made a visit to Algiers. Upon his return to Paris, he began exhibiting at the Salon where he attracted critical praise.

The onset of the French Revolution of 1848 forced him to return to Saint Petersburg, where he was initially employed as an illustrator; notably for the works of Faddey Bulgarin and Nikolay Gretsch. He worked primarily in the media of lithography and woodcuts and was sometimes referred to as the "Russian Gavarni".

He travelled extensively throughout Russia, serving as a battle painter during the second phase of the Caucasian War. In 1852, he accompanied Tsar Nicholas I on a visit to Finland. Later, he made sketches in a besieged Sevastopol. As a result, in 1855, he was named an "Academician" by the Imperial Academy.

From 1851 to 1862, by leave of the Royal Family, he published the Russian Art Gazette, which featured works by many prominent Russian artists, made into lithographs by Timm. He had to stop publishing the gazette when he began to suffer from an eye disease.

In 1867, he moved to Berlin to seek treatment and took up a position as the Director of a privately operated ceramics institute. He never returned to Russia. In 1876, he was appointed a professor at the Prussian Academy of Arts and began working at the Royal Porcelain Factory. After his death on 7 April 1895, in Berlin, his widow donated his estate to the Riga City Art Museum. A major retrospective was held at their new building in 1906.

== Selected paintings ==
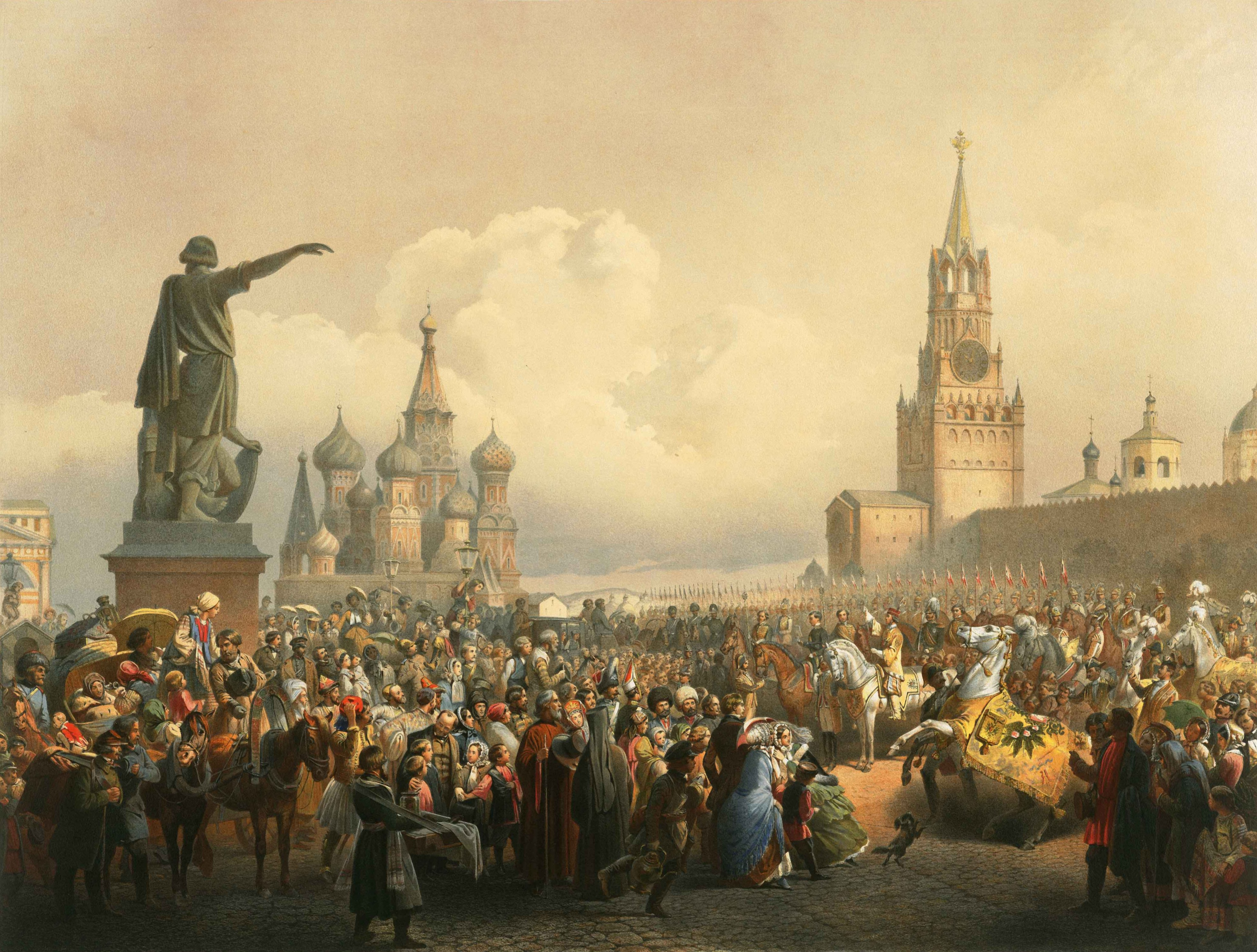
Announcing the Coronation of Alexander II

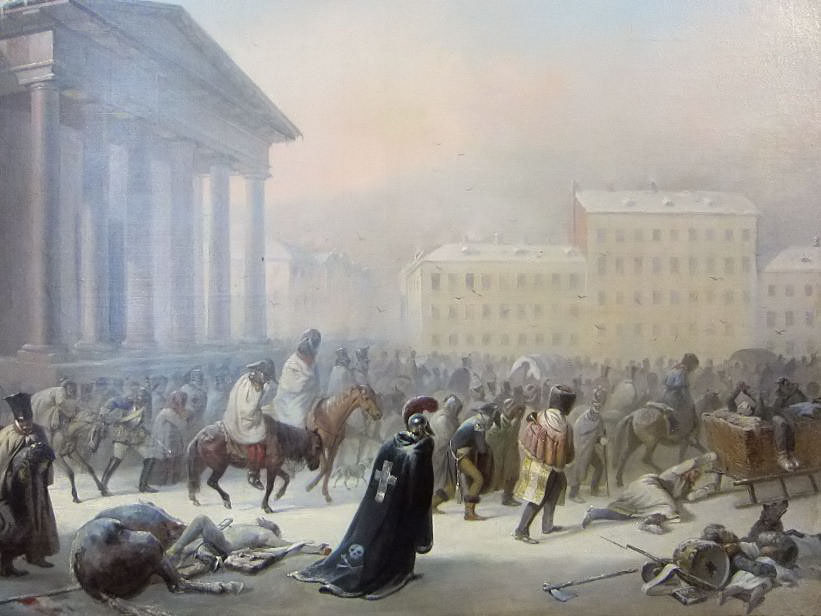
The French Retreat
through Vilnius

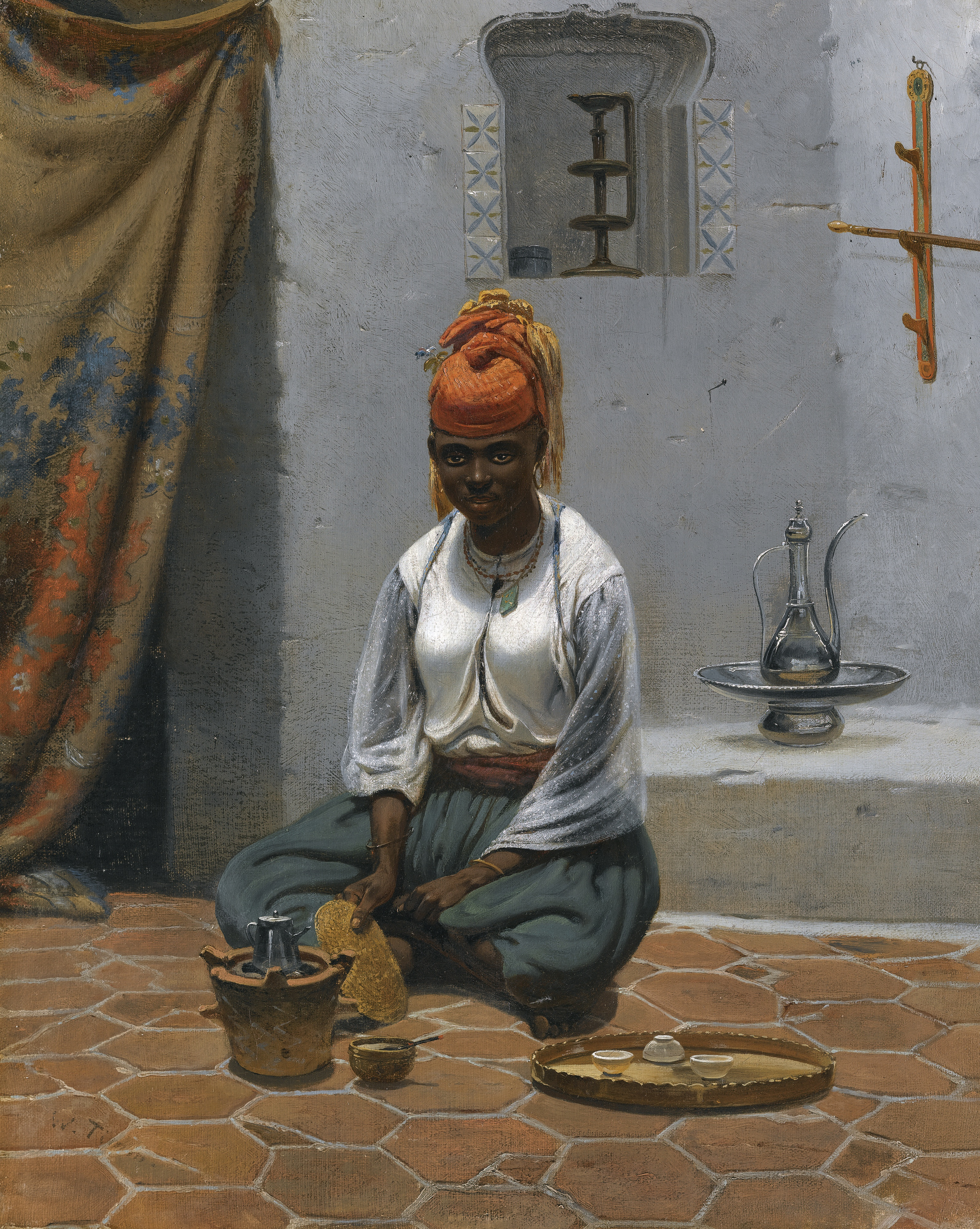
Making Tea
in Algiers

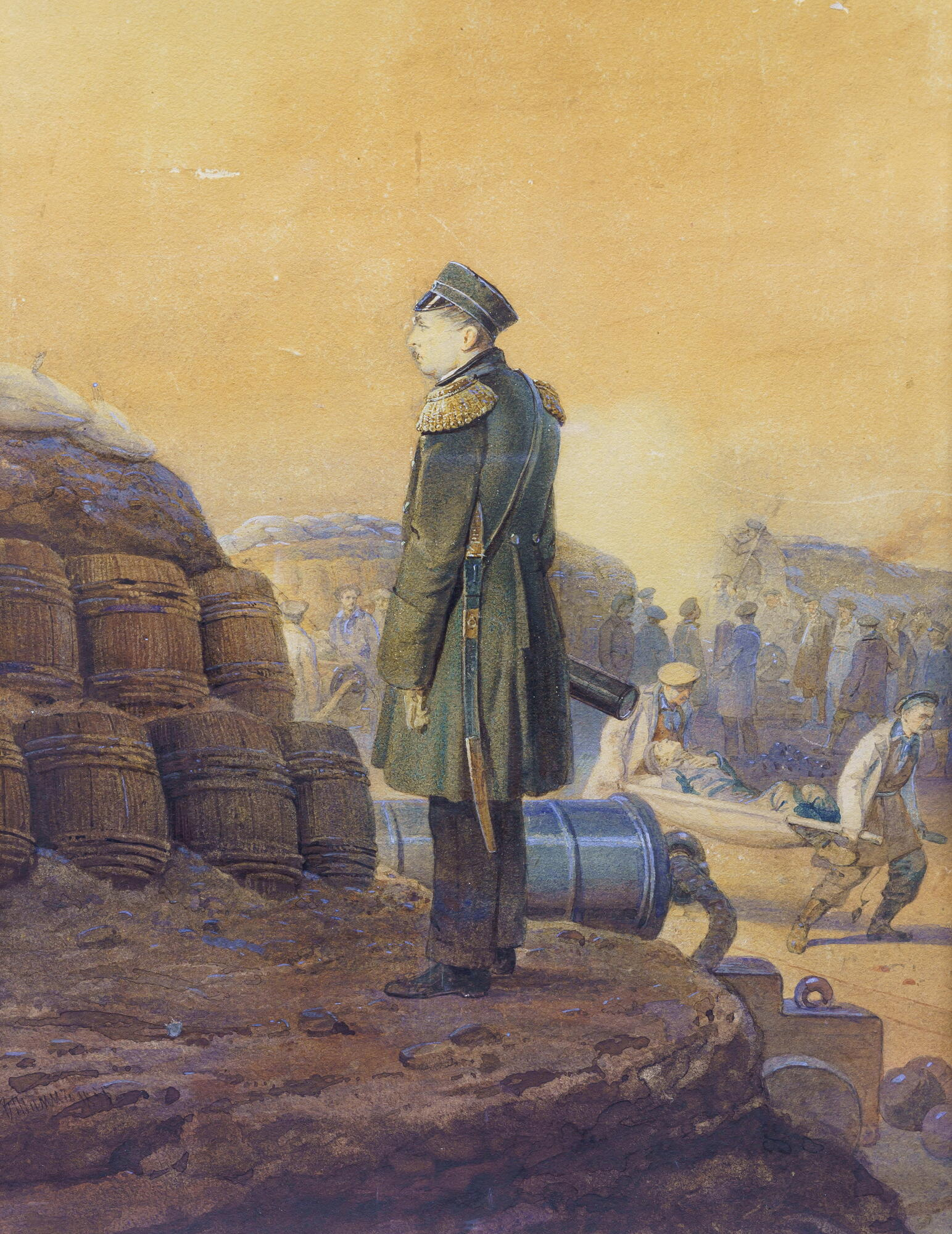
Pavel Nakhimov, 1855; Naval Museum, St. Petersburg

== Sources ==
- "Тимм, Василий Федорович" . Brockhaus and Efron Encyclopedic Dictionary (in Russian). 1906.
- Kuznetsov, Sergey (2003). "Timm, Georg Wilhelm". Grove Art Online.
