= Pauls Stradins Museum of the History of Medicine =

Museum in Riga, Latvia

- Paula Stradiņa Medicīnas vēstures muzejs
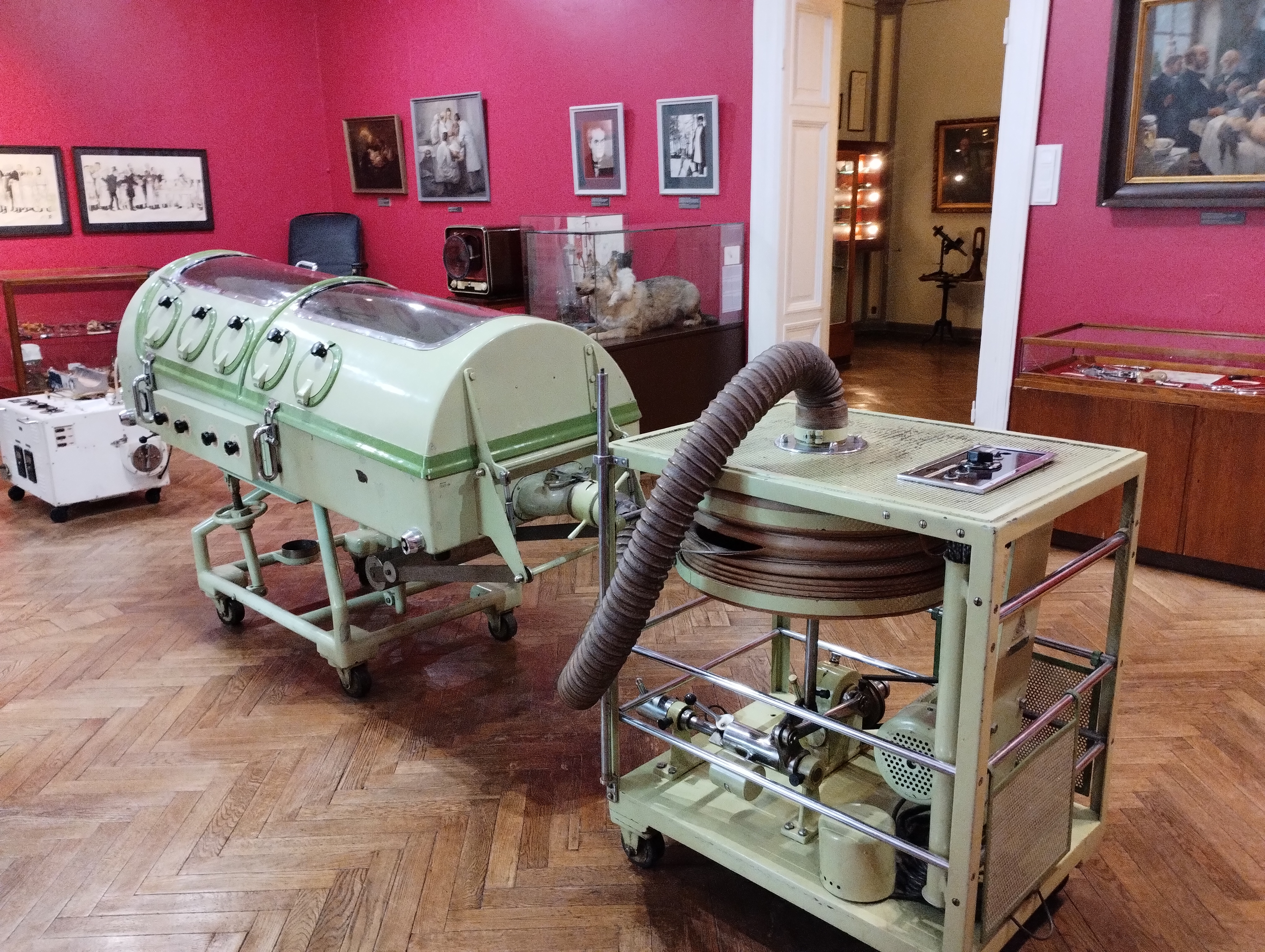
- Iron lung at the Pauls Stradins Museum of the History of Medicine

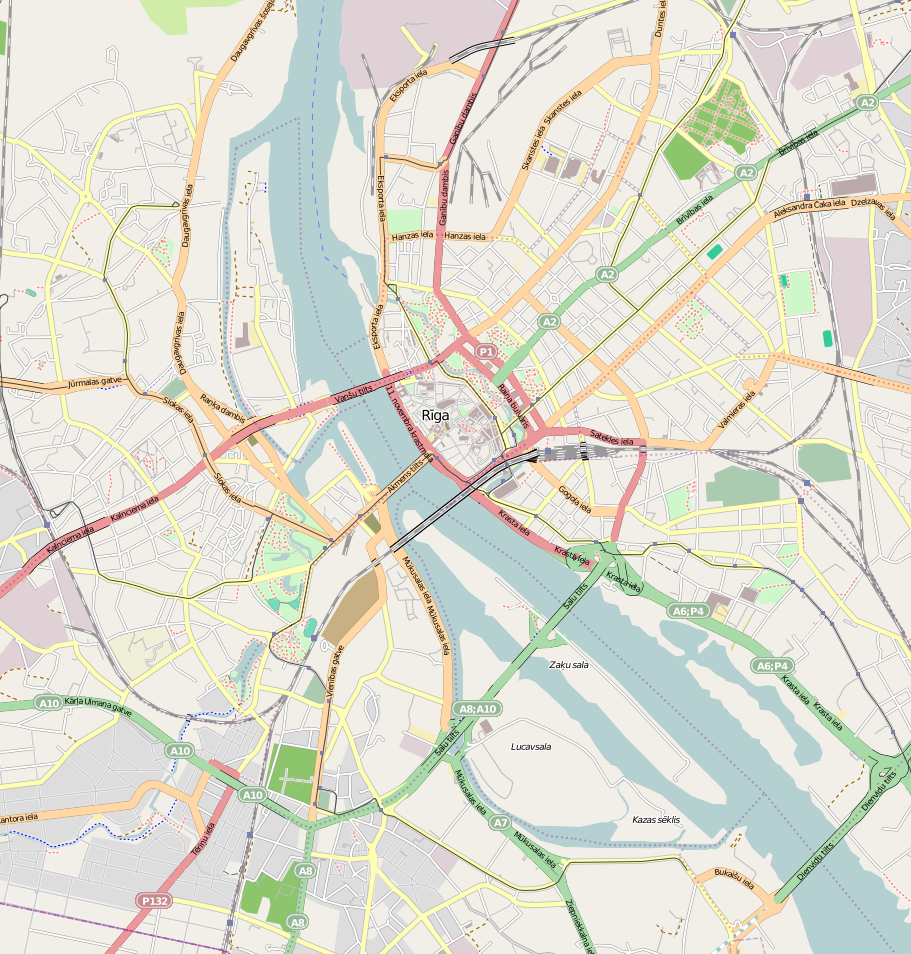
- Location within Riga Location within Latvia
- Established: 1957
- Location: Antonijas ielā 1, Vecrīga, Riga, Latvia
- Coordinates: 56°57′25.5″N 24°06′28.5″E
- Collection size: over 203,000 artifacts
- Director: Edīte Bērziņa
- Website: www.mvm.lv/en

Paul Stradins Museum of the History of Medicine (Latvian: Paula Stradiņa Medicīnas vēstures muzejs) is museum in Riga, one of the largest medical museums in the world. The exposition presents the development of medicine and pharmacology from ancient times. A separate section is devoted to the history of medicine Latvia.

The museum building, at Antonijas Street 1, Riga, was designed in 1875 in the style of neo-Renaissance by a Riga architect, academician of architecture Heinrich Scheel. For the needs of the museum building was remodeled in 1957.

== History of the museum ==
The museum was founded on October 1, 1957, and open to visitors in 1961. The basis of the museum was the gift of the professor Pauls Stradiņš (1896–1958). The idea to create a museum of the history of medicine came from professor Stradiņš in the 30s of the XX century, when his personal collection of medical exhibits gained fame among his colleagues. Professor Stradiņš, together with like-minded people, systematically created a collection of visual aids for medical students and specialists. Initially, medical fields of surgery and oncology, the professions of the professor himself, were most widely represented in the museum's collection.

In 1987, the museum expanded with new branch Museum of Pharmacy, which was created on the basis of personal collections of the historian Davis Blumenthal and pharmacist Janis Maisite.

== Museum exhibits ==
The museum has more than 203,000 storage units. The museum collection is constantly updated.
