= Luigi Bienaimé =

Italian sculptor

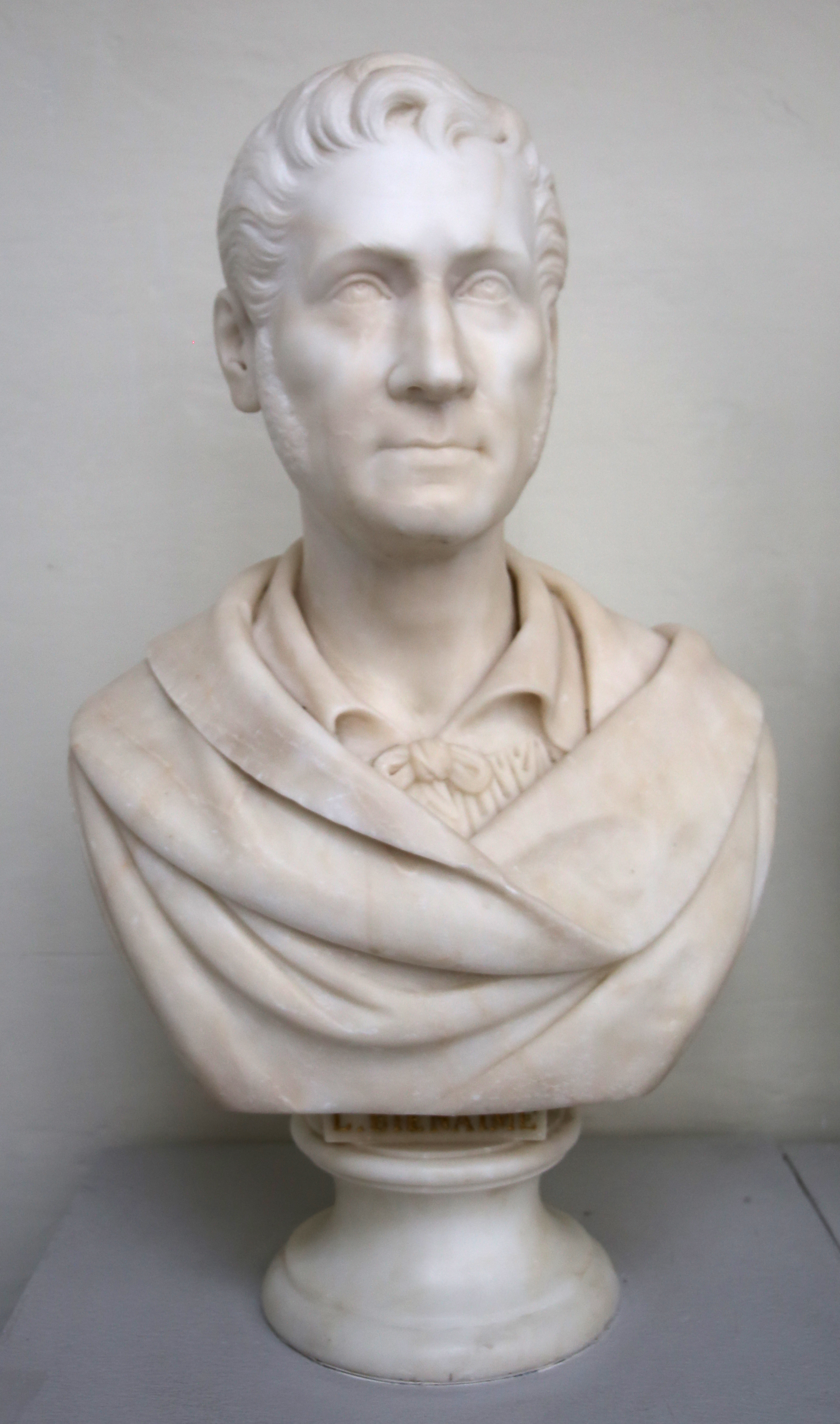
Bust of Luigi Bienaimé

Luigi Bienaimé (Carrara, 1795–1878) was a sculptor active in Italy during the Neoclassical period.

His family originally was from what is now Belgium, however, he gained a stipend from Carrara to study sculpture in Rome, where he studied in the studio of Thorvaldsen. There he worked alongside Pietro Tenerani, Emilio Volff, and Pietro Galli.

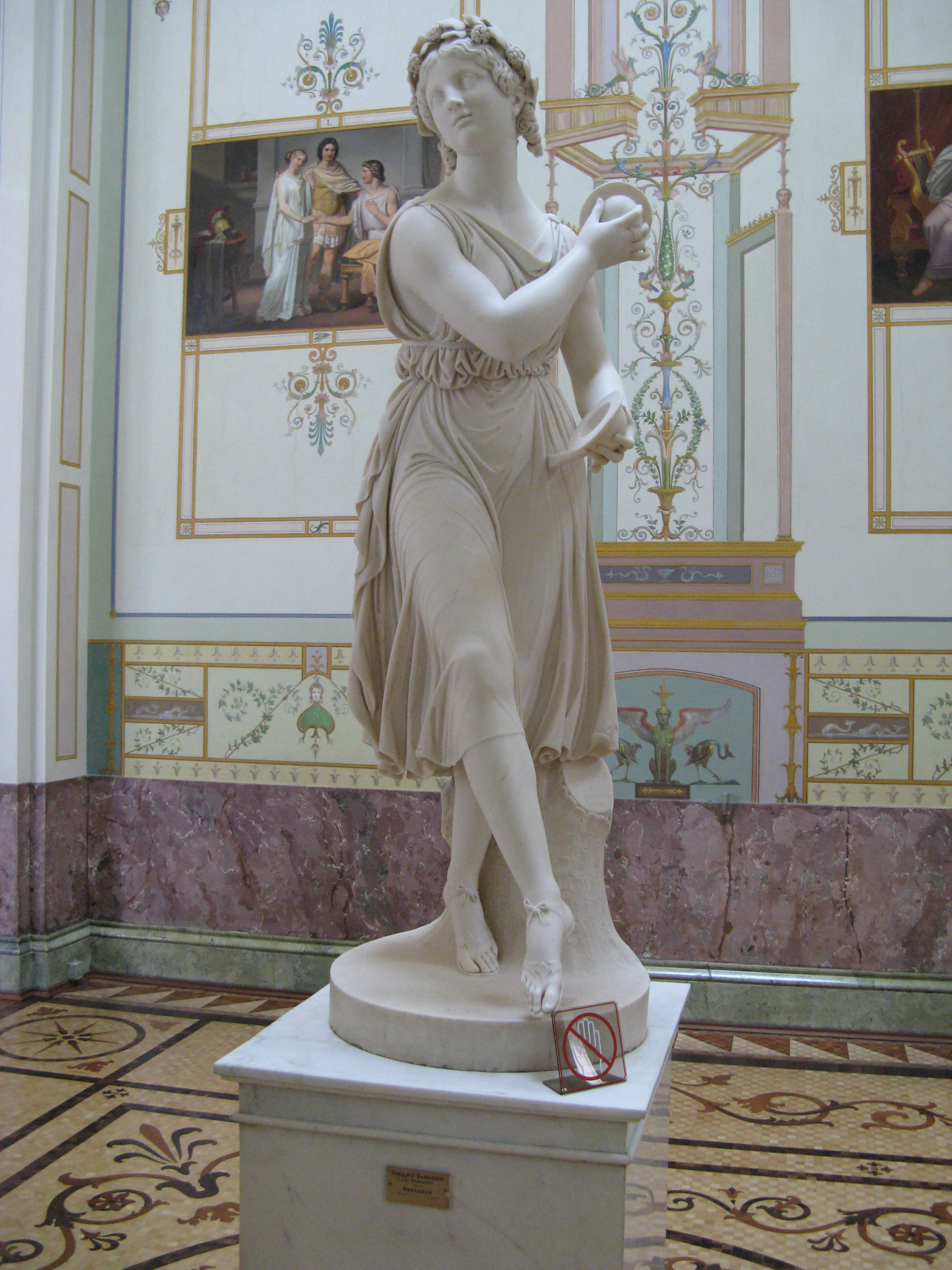
Dancing Bacchante, Hermitage, St Petersburg

Bienaimé was commissioned a number of works by the Russian court in St Peterburg, including a Marriage for the Czar, a Bacchante dancing, a Diana surprised, and a Psyche abandoned by Love. He was also prolific with portraits, including the Czar, Napoleon, and Washington. He completed sculptures for Prince Torlonia and Prince Gallitzin. In 1845, he was elected an honorary member of the Imperial Academy of Arts in St Petersburg in Imperial Russia.

Bienaimé became professor of sculpture in the Accademia di San Luca. . Private Collection: France: Bust of President George Washington, white Carrara marble signed L. Bienaimé F. H: 54 cm x L: 30 cm x D: 27 cm

Alexandre de Bothuri collection

== Sources ==
- Belyaev, N. S. (2018). Honorary Free Associates of the Imperial Academy of Arts. Brief biographical guide (PDF). St Petersburg: Russian Academy of Sciences. p. 50. ISBN 978-5-336-00234-8.
