= Latvian Firefighting Museum =

Firefighting museum in Riga, Latvia

- Latvijas Ugunsdzēsības muzejs
- The museum building in 2022
- Established: 4 September 1978 (exhibition); 1 October 1980 (museum status)
- Location: 5 Hanzas Street, Riga, Latvia
- Coordinates: 56.9623°N 24.1124°E
- Type: Firefighting museum
- Collection size: 32,764 objects (end of 2025)
- Website: www.muzejs.vugd.gov.lv/en

The Latvian Firefighting Museum (Latvian: Latvijas Ugunsdzēsības muzejs) is a museum in Riga, Latvia. Its exhibitions cover the history of firefighting in Latvia from the mid-nineteenth century. It opened on 4 September 1978.

== Building ==
The museum occupies an early twentieth-century fire station at 5 Hanzas Street, designed by Reinhold Schmaeling. The Art Nouveau building is a protected architectural monument of local importance. Its tower served as a lookout and a place to dry fire hoses, and has a Baroque-style spire.

== Collections ==
The museum's holdings include firefighters' uniforms, helmets, tools and equipment. Hand-operated and mechanical pumps are displayed alongside fire vehicles. Exhibits include a steam pump made in London in 1899 and a Chevrolet Six fire engine. The museum also displays models of firefighting vehicles.

The collections also include fire brigade flags. The Hall of Honour on the second floor commemorates firefighters killed on duty and records awards for their service. The collection contained 32,764 objects at the end of 2025.

== Education ==
Visitors can watch documentary films, take part in quizzes and practise extinguishing fires. These activities teach fire safety and responses to emergencies. The museum offers programmes for schoolchildren and educational lectures.
