= Latvian Museum of Pharmacy =

Museum in Riga, Latvia

- Paula Stradiņa Medicīnas vēstures muzejs
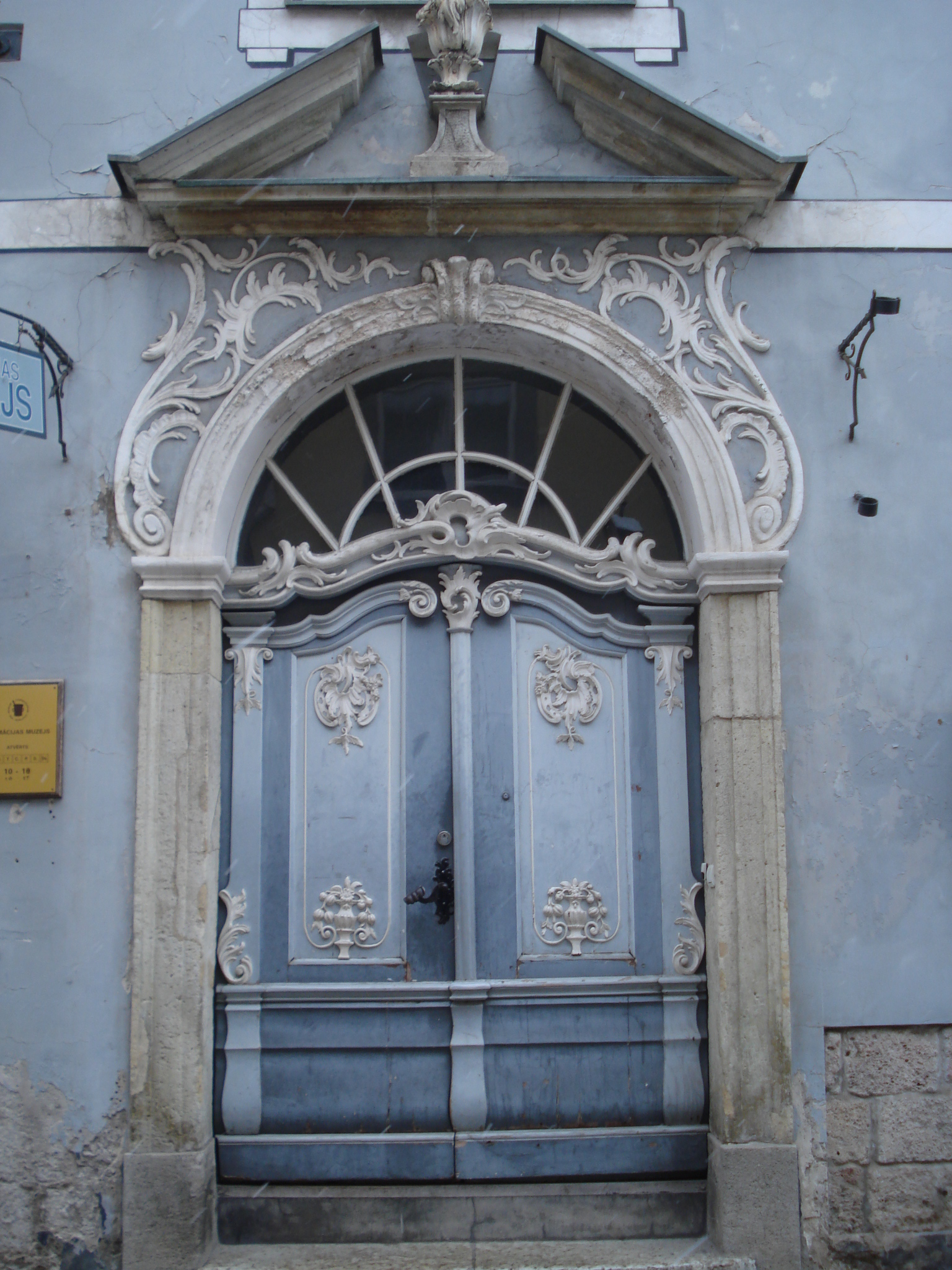
- Museum entrance on Richard Wagner street, Riga.

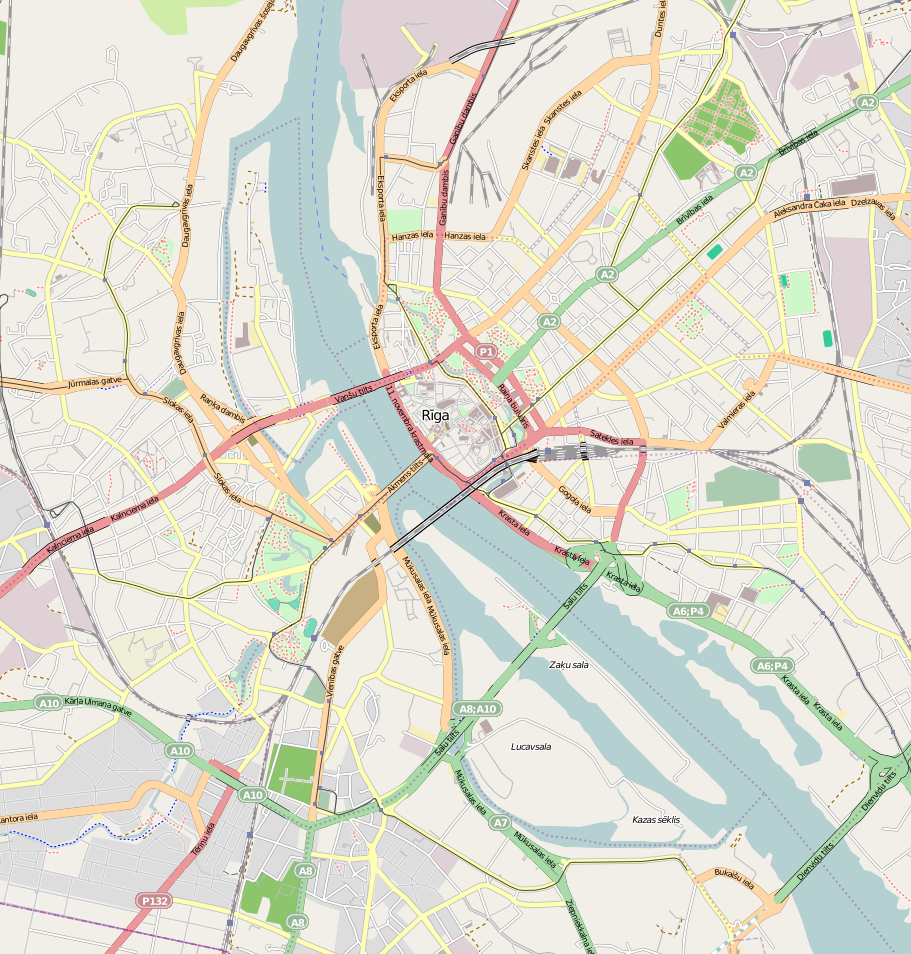
- Location within Riga Location within Latvia
- Established: 1987
- Location: Richard Wagner ielā 1, Vecrīga, Riga, Latvia
- Coordinates: 56°56′54″N 24°06′41″E
- Director: Edīte Bērziņa
- Website: www.mvm.lv/en

The Latvian Museum of Pharmacy is a medical museum in Riga, Latvia. It was founded in 1987 in association with the Pauls Stradins Museum for History of Medicine and is located on Richard Wagner street in an 18th-century building which itself is an architectural monument. The museum is dedicated to understanding the development of pharmacy and pharmacies in Latvia and contains documents and books from the 17th- 19th century, pharmacist tools and devices for preparing drugs, and drugs which were manufactured in Latvia in the 1920s and 1930s
