= Andrejs Upīts' Memorial Museum =

Museum in Latvia

Coordinates: 56.954362°N 24.11846°E

The Memorial Museum of the writer Andrejs Upīts (1877–1970) was established in 1972. It is located in the writer's former apartment in Riga at 38 Brīvības Street, Flat 4 and has been open to the public since 4 December 1974. At the same time, the house-museum of the writer was created also in his native village Skrīveri.

Together with his family, Andrejs Upīts moved into this apartment in January 1951 and lived there for the last nineteen years of his life. The building was built in 1911 according to design by architect Ernsts Pole, and was intended to house a bank and several apartments on the top floors. The museum has three memorial rooms open to its visitors: the study, the guest room, the dining room and the open guest room/exhibition hall where exhibitions and events take place. All the furnishing, household items, photographs and, in particular, the library containing more than seven thousand books reflect the personality and working style of Andrejs Upīts.

Total museum resources contains 30,000 units.
