= Vecrīga =

Historical center of Riga, Latvia

- Neighbourhood of Riga
- Vecpilsēta
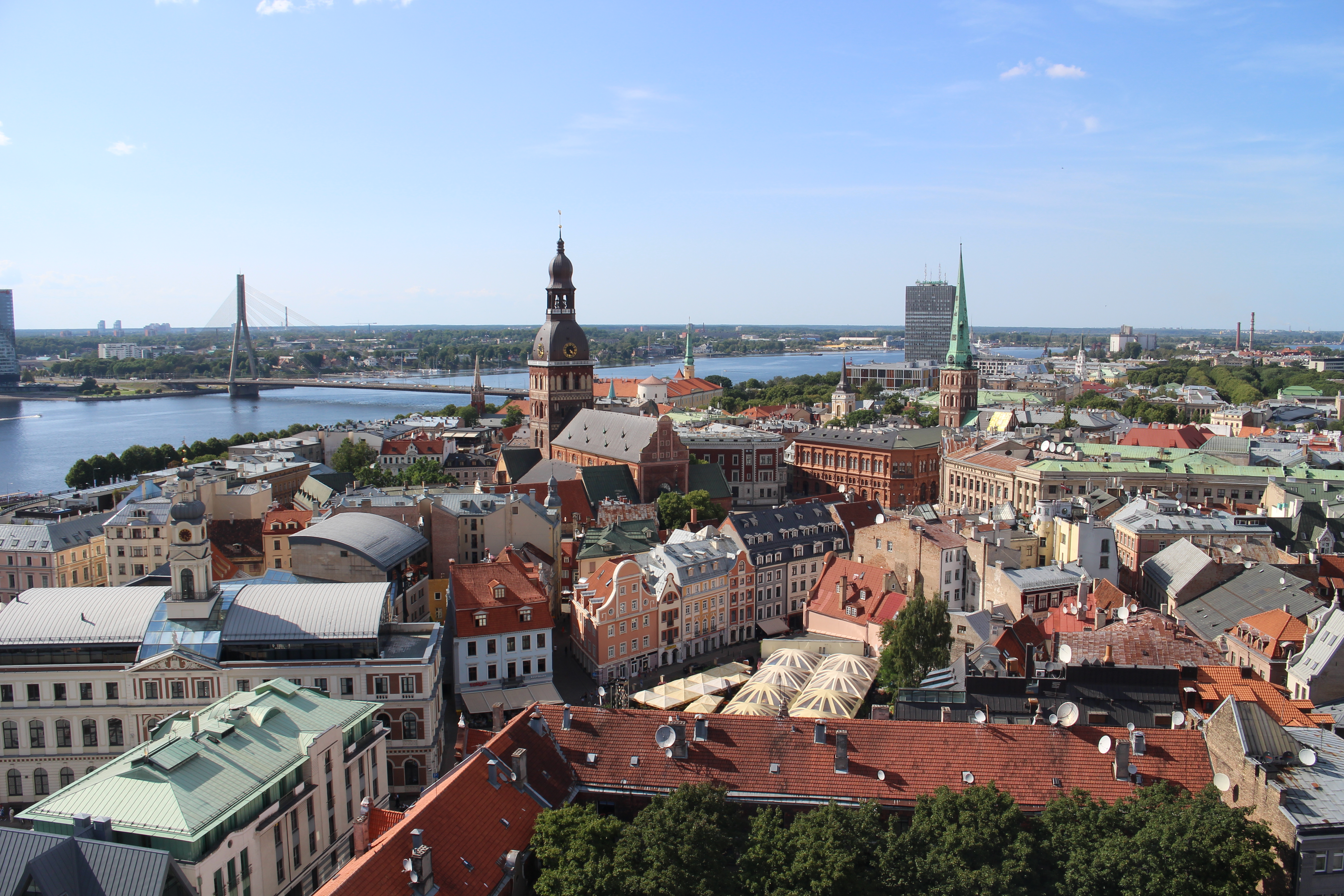
- The Old Town of Riga

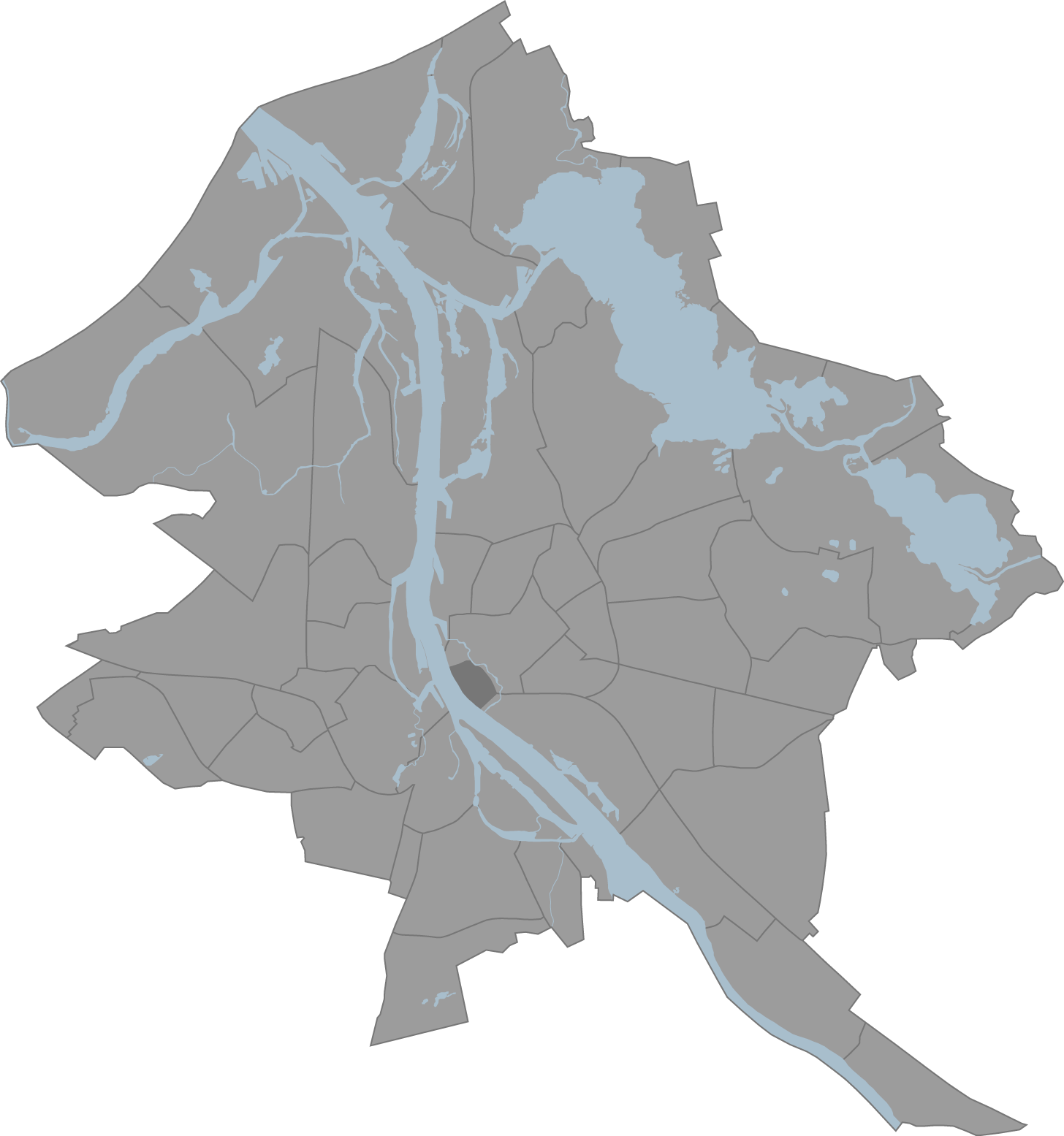
- Location of Vecpilsēta in Riga
- Country: Latvia
- City: Riga
- District: Central District

Area
  - Total: 0.944 km^{2} (0.364 sq mi)

Population (2024)
  - Total: 2,140
  - Density: 2,270/km^{2} (5,870/sq mi)
- Postal code: LV-1050
- Website: apkaimes.lv

UNESCO World Heritage Site
- Official name: Historic Centre of Riga
- Type: Cultural
- Criteria: ii, i
- Designated: 1997
- Reference no.
- UNESCO region: Europe

Vecrīga ("Old Riga") is the historical center and a neighbourhood (as Vecpilsēta, "Old City") of Riga, Latvia, located in the Central District on the east side of Daugava River. Vecrīga is famous for its old churches and cathedrals, such as Riga Cathedral, St. James's Cathedral and St. Peter's Church.

== History ==
Vecrīga is the original area of Riga and consists of the historic city limits before the city was greatly expanded in the late 19th century. Vecrīga was once protected by a surrounding wall, except the side adjacent to the Daugava river bank. When the wall was demolished, the waters from Daugava were diverted into area of the former wall, creating Riga City Canal.

=== Heritage ===
In the early 1990s, Vecrīga's streets were closed to traffic and only residents of the area and the local delivery vehicles were allowed within Vecrīga's limits with special permits. Vecrīga is part of a UNESCO World Heritage Site listed as "Historic Centre of Riga", which also includes most of the surrounding Centrs district.

Vecrīga is the oldest area of Riga. Despite its primordial state, most of the buildings were made of wood. Many architectural works remain from the times of renaissance, baroque and medieval times in the middle of the unique and notable buildings in the style of Art Nouveau, especially the ones created by architect Mikhail Eisenstein.

== Landmarks ==
=== Churches ===
- Church of St. Peter
- Dome Cathedral
- Cathedral of Saint James
- Church of Saint John
- Church of Our Lady of Sorrows
- Anglican Church
- Reformed Church
- Church of Mary Magdalene

=== Museums ===
- Military Museum
- Museum of the History of Riga and Navigation
- Sports Museum
- Latvian Museum of Pharmacy
- Latvian Museum of Photography
- Riga castle
- Latvian Museum of National History
- Art Museum Riga Bourse
- Museum of Decorative and Applied Arts
- Museum of the Occupation of Latvia
- Latvian Museum of Architecture
- Riga Film Museum

== Gallery ==
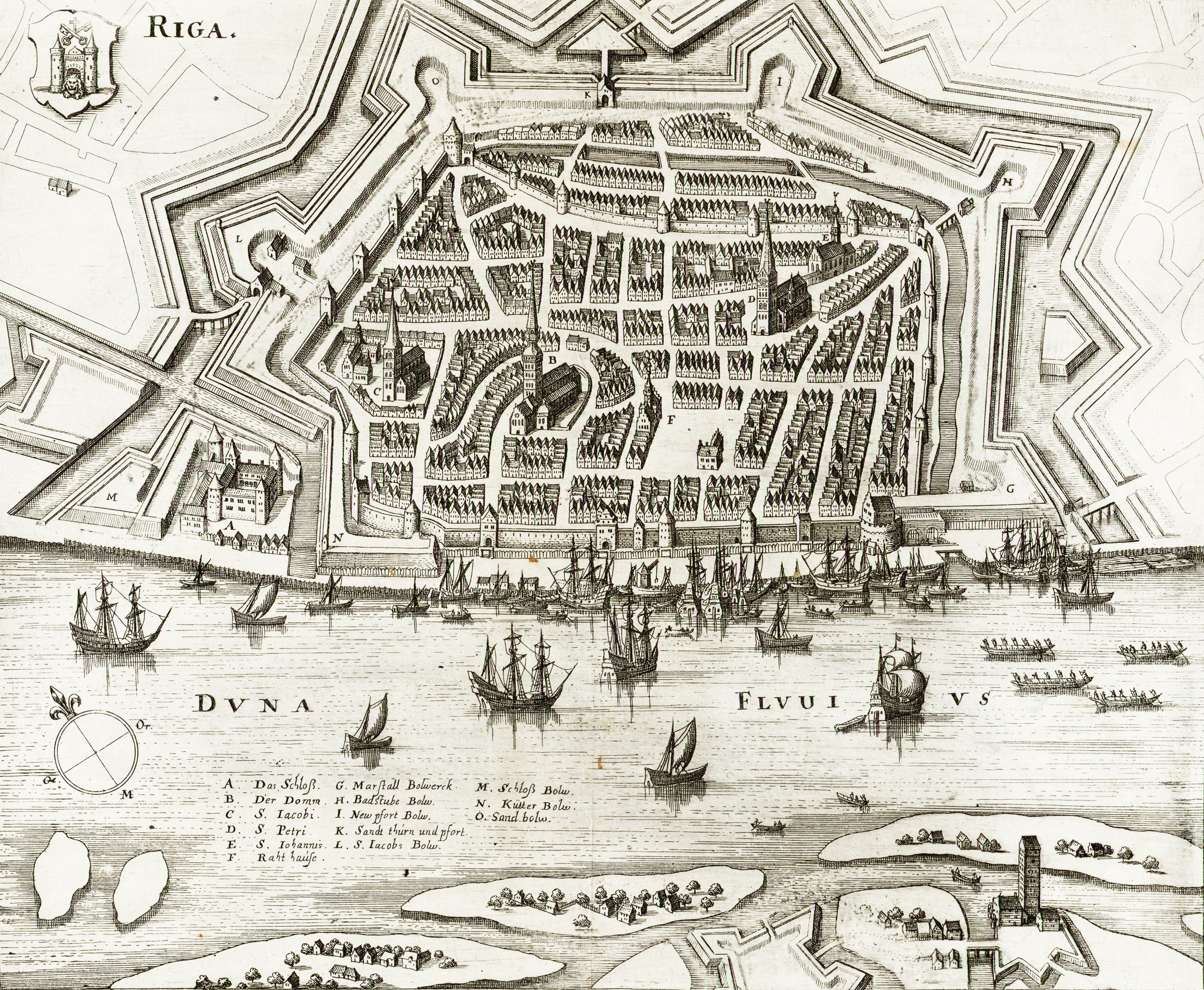
The original boundaries of the Old Riga in 1637

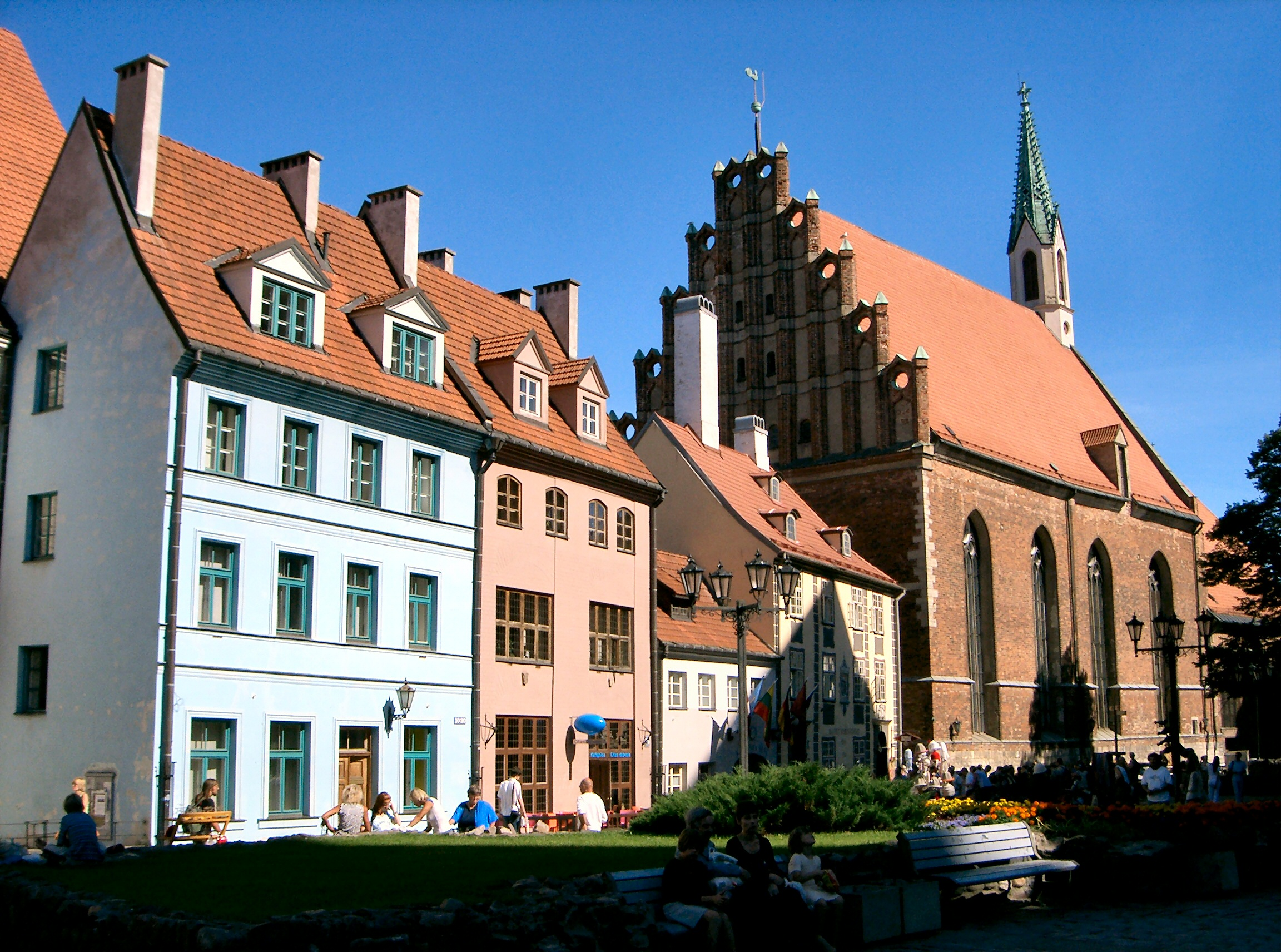
St. John's Church, Riga

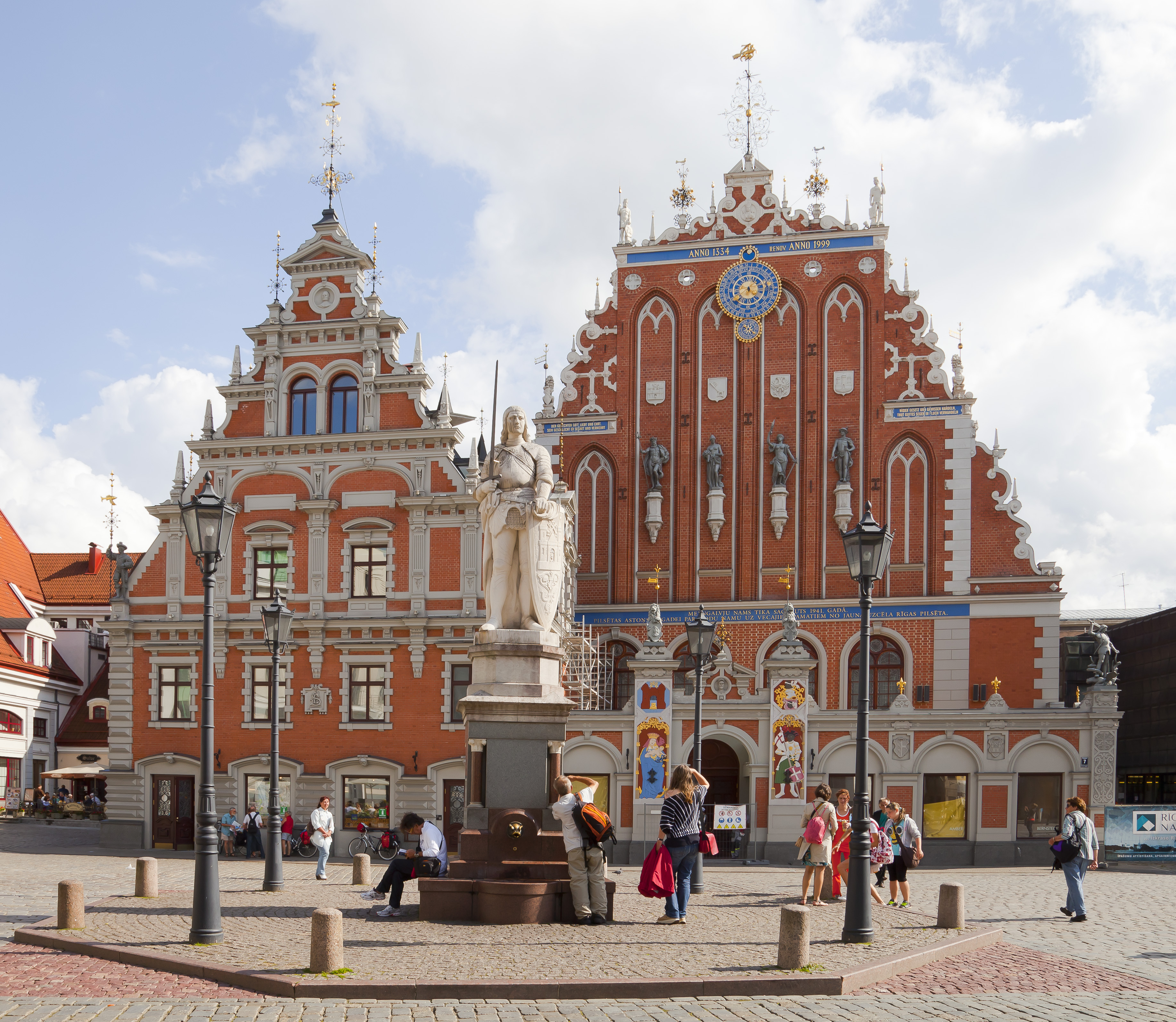
The House of the Blackheads and Roland statue

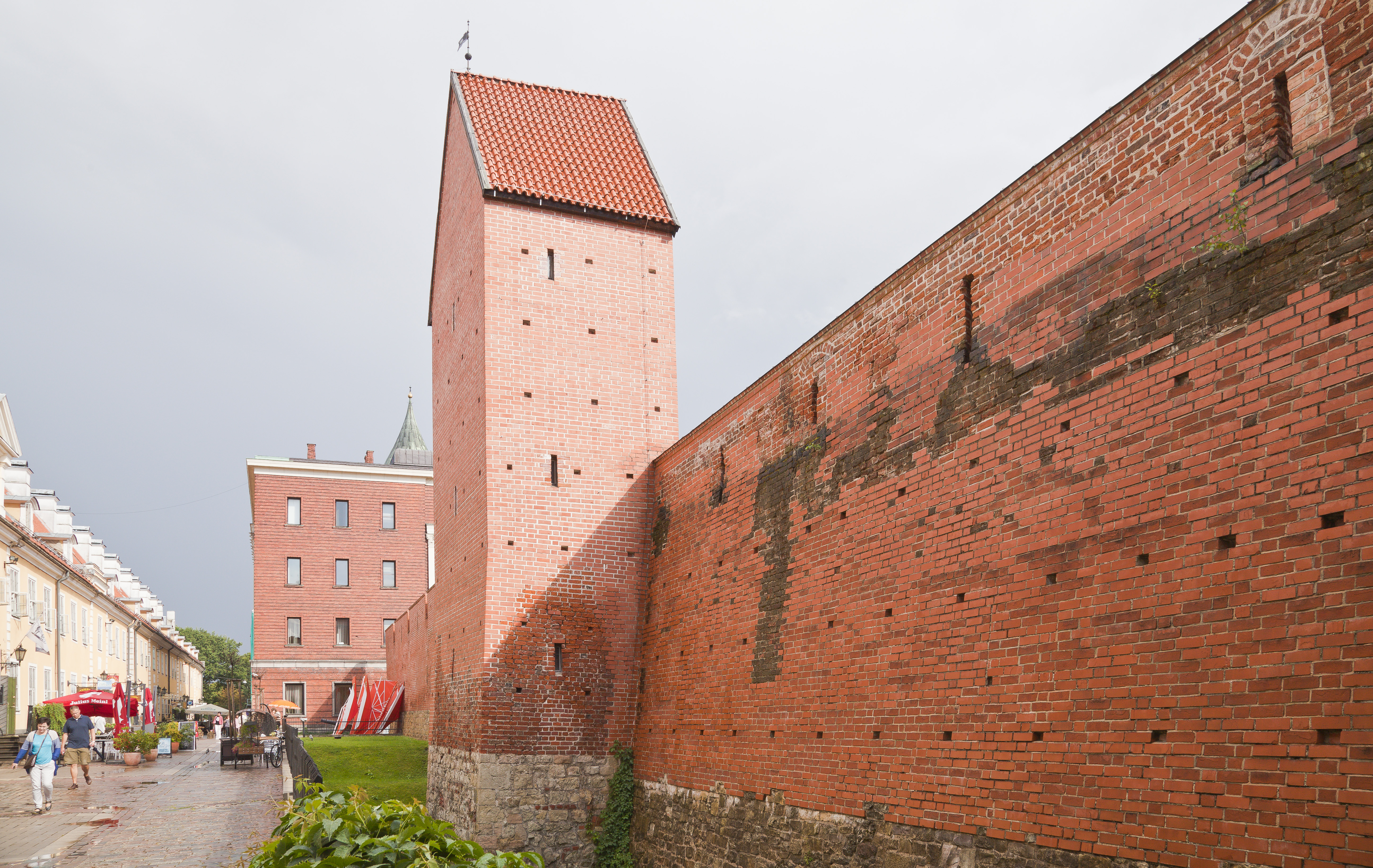
Reconstructed section of the medieval city wall

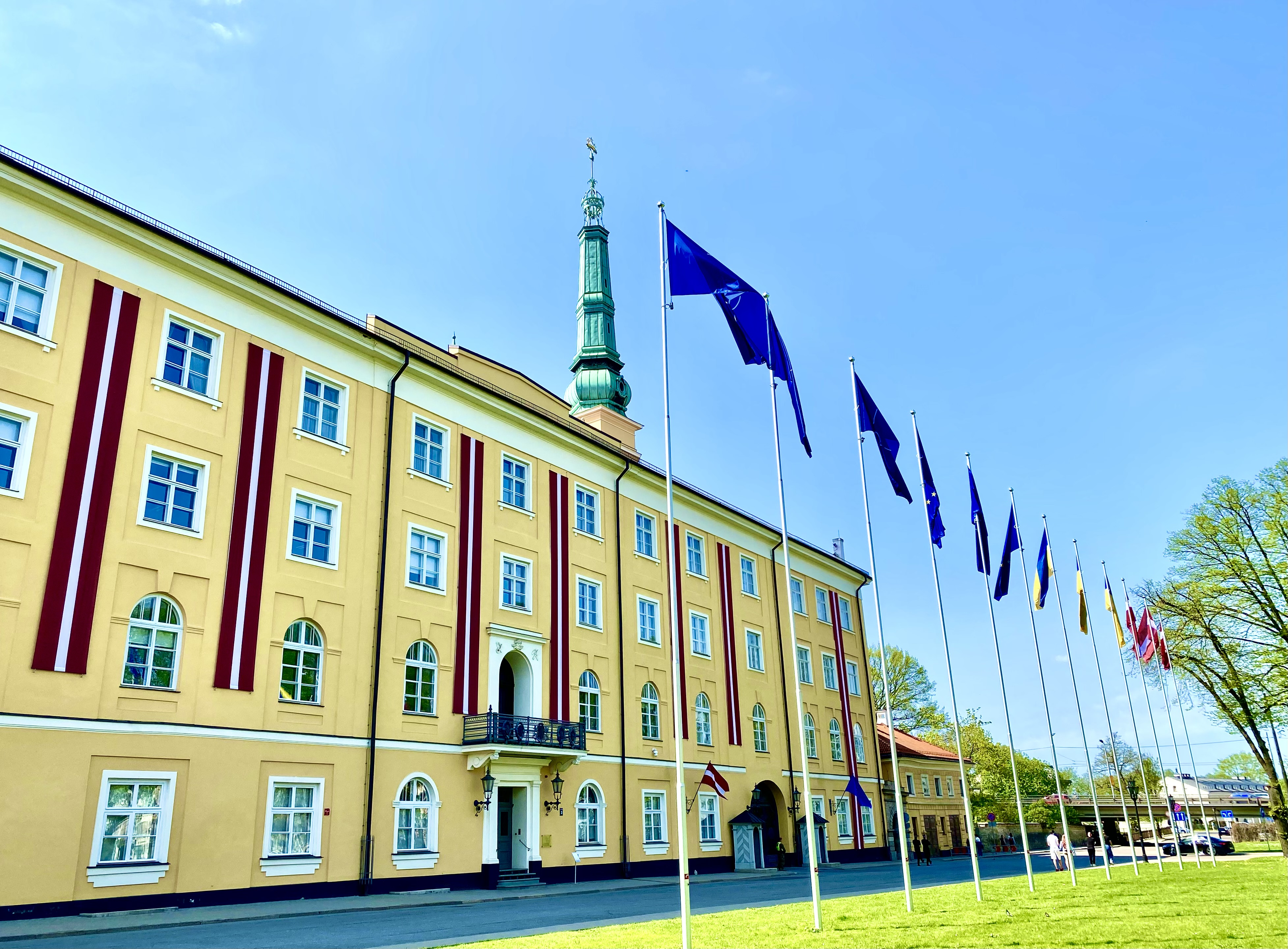
Riga Castle in Vecrīga

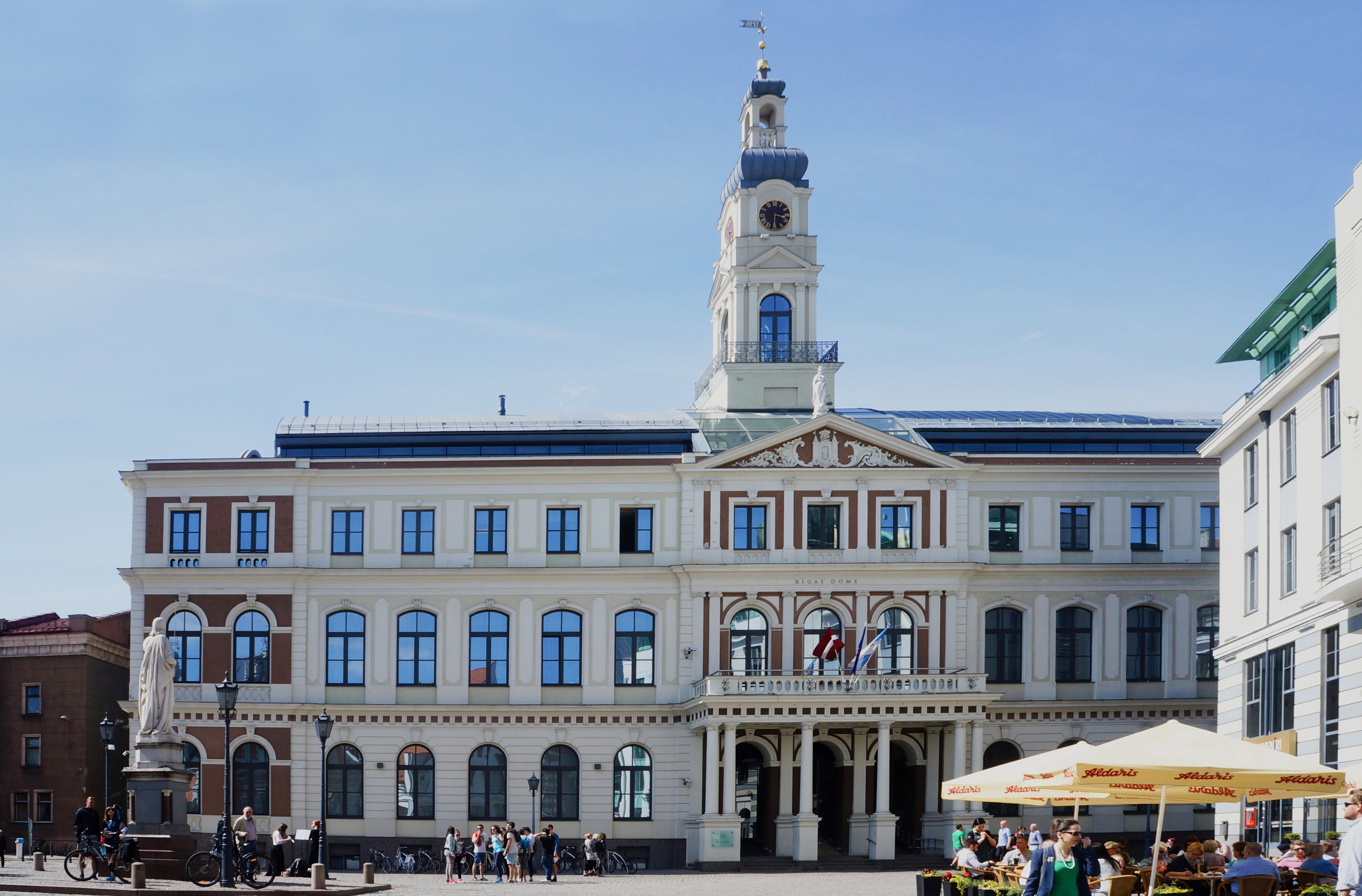
Riga Town Hall in Vecrīga

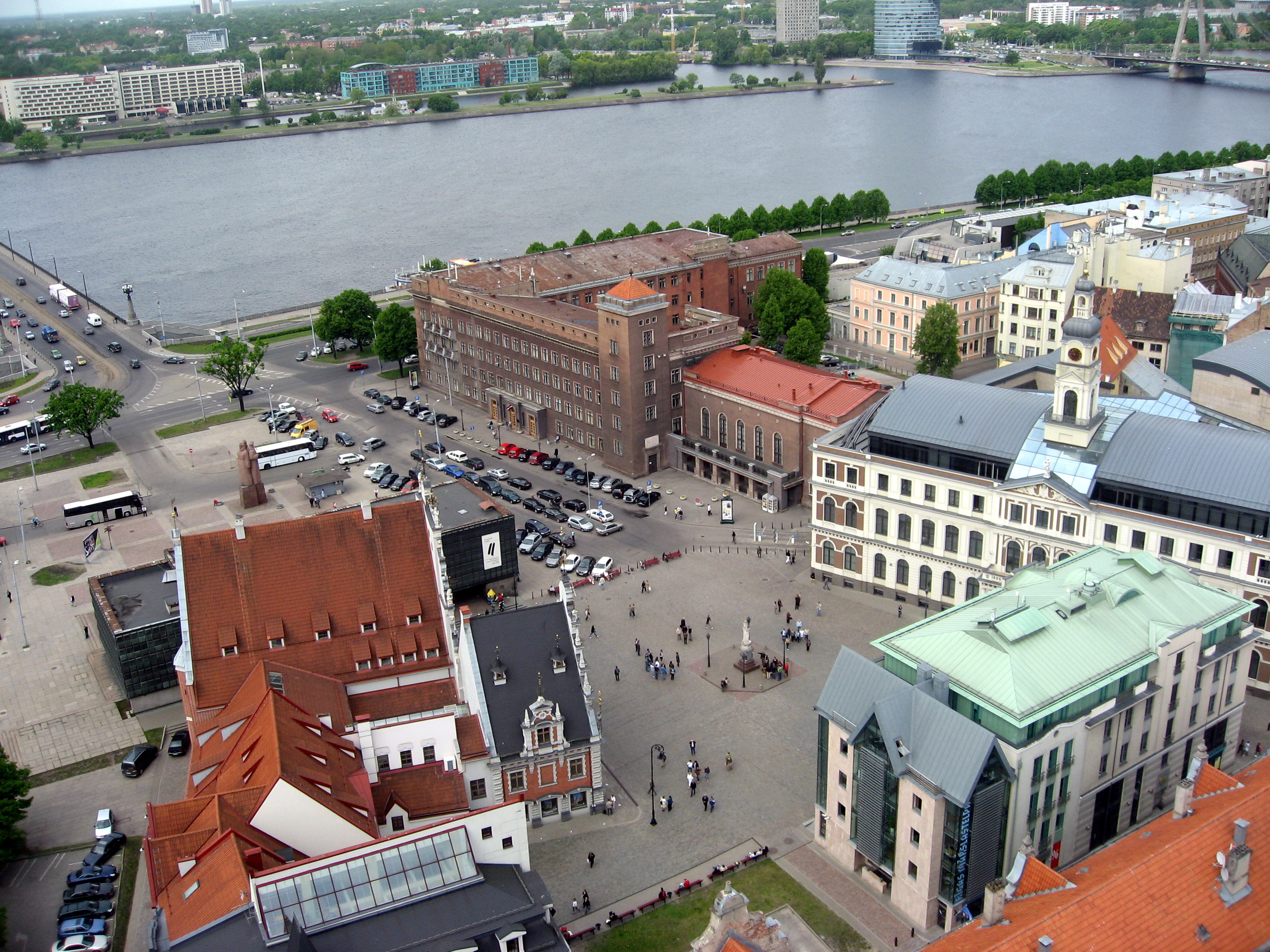
Aerial view of the Town Hall Square

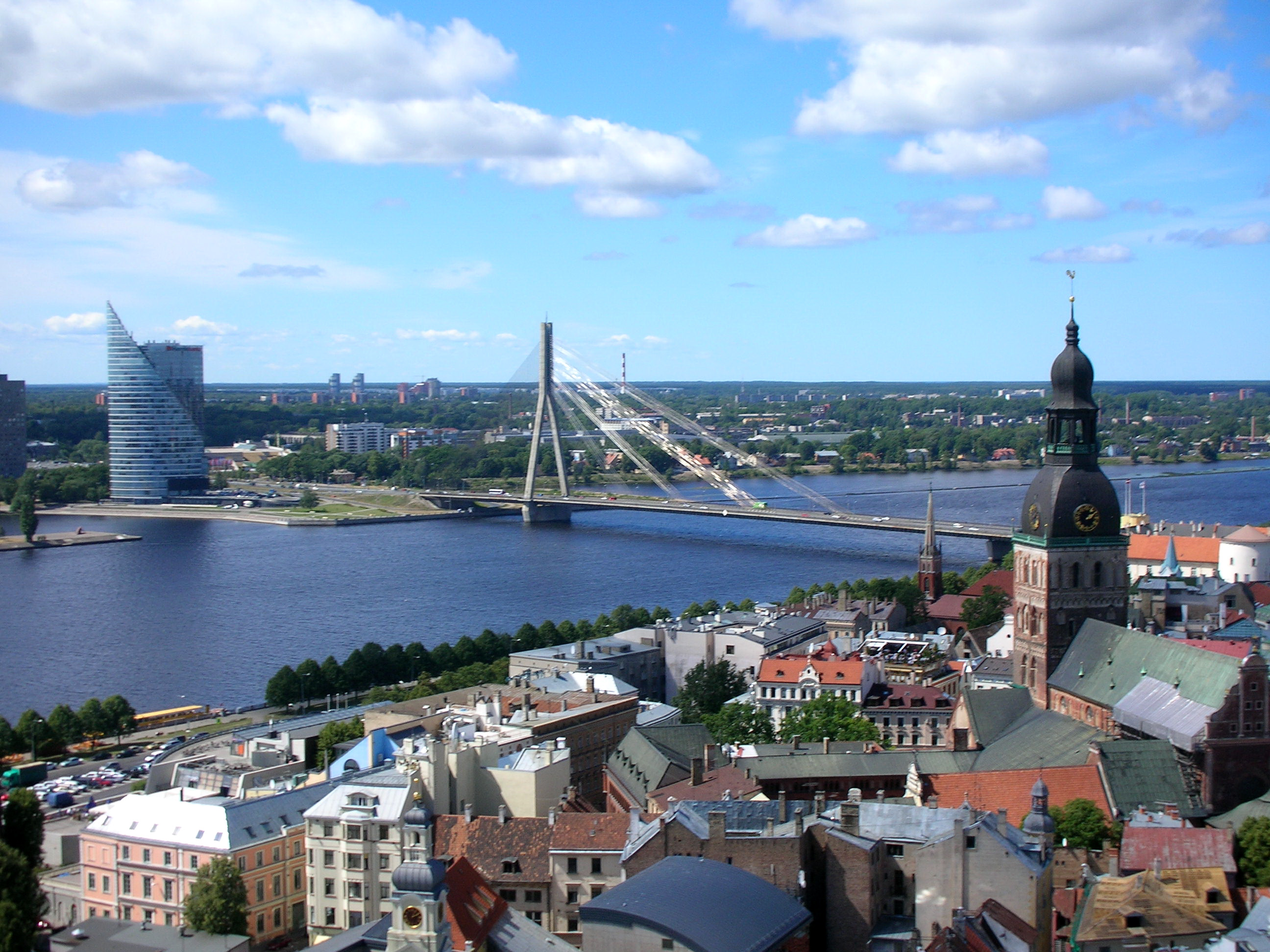
View of Vanšu Bridge

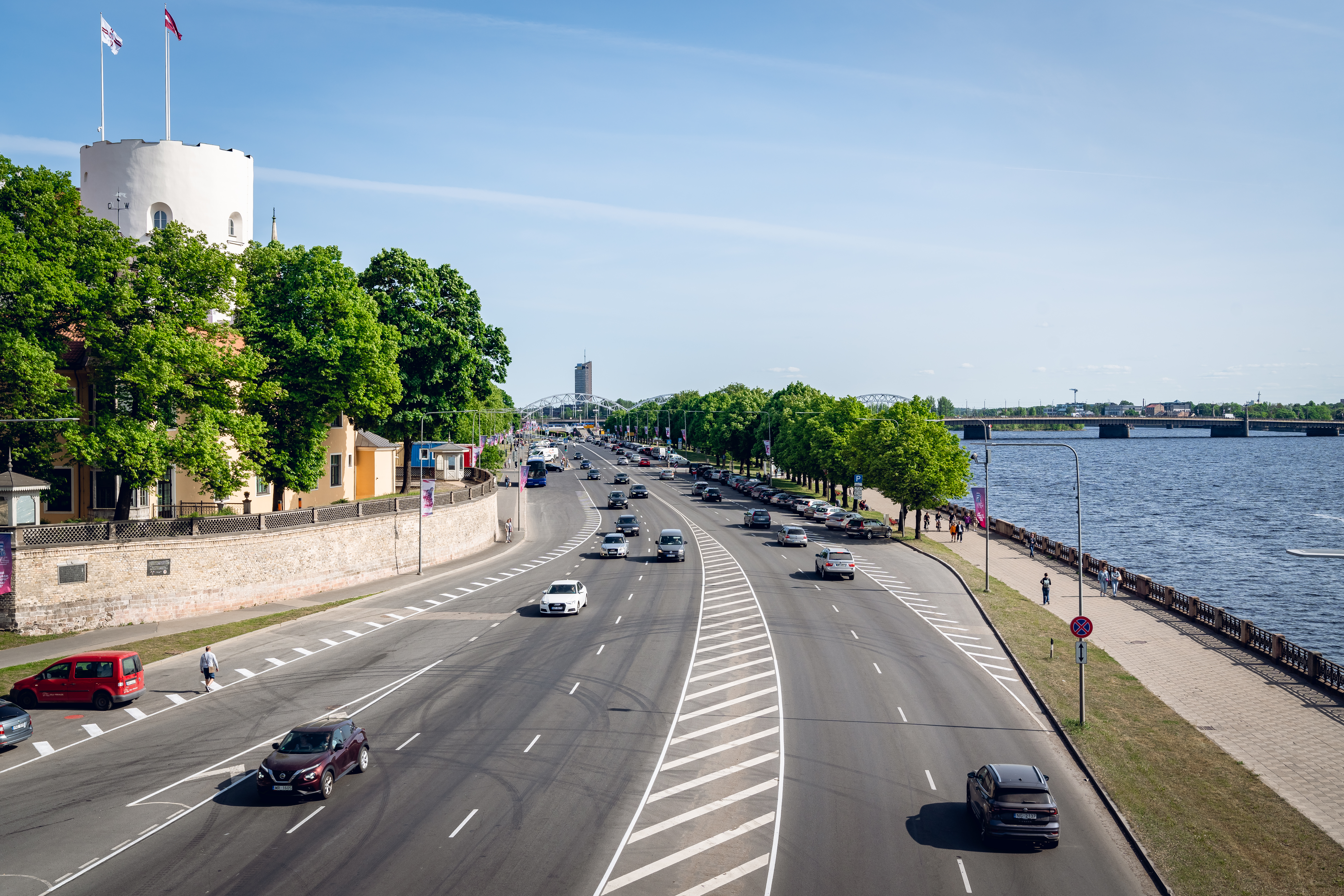
11 November Embankment

== See also ==
- Triangula Bastion
