= Triangular Bastion =

18th-century fortifications of Riga

Coordinates: 56°56′52.84″N 24°6′11.45″E

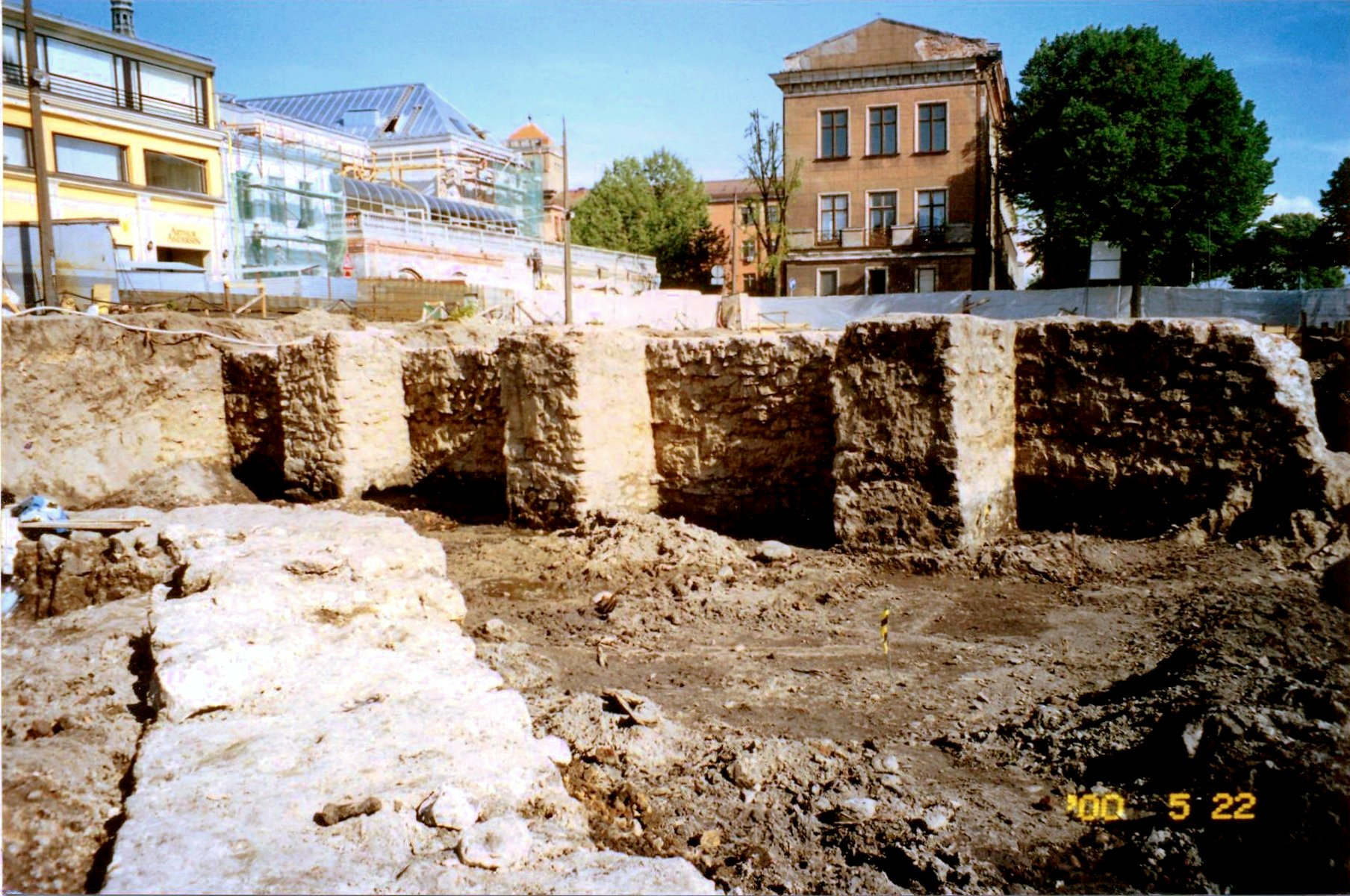
The uncovered remains of the Triangular Bastion during an excavation in 2000

The Triangular Bastion (Latvian: Triangula bastions) was part of the 18th-century fortifications of Riga. Its foundations are nowadays visible under a modern office building owned by Euro Live Technologies, a playtech company.

== History ==
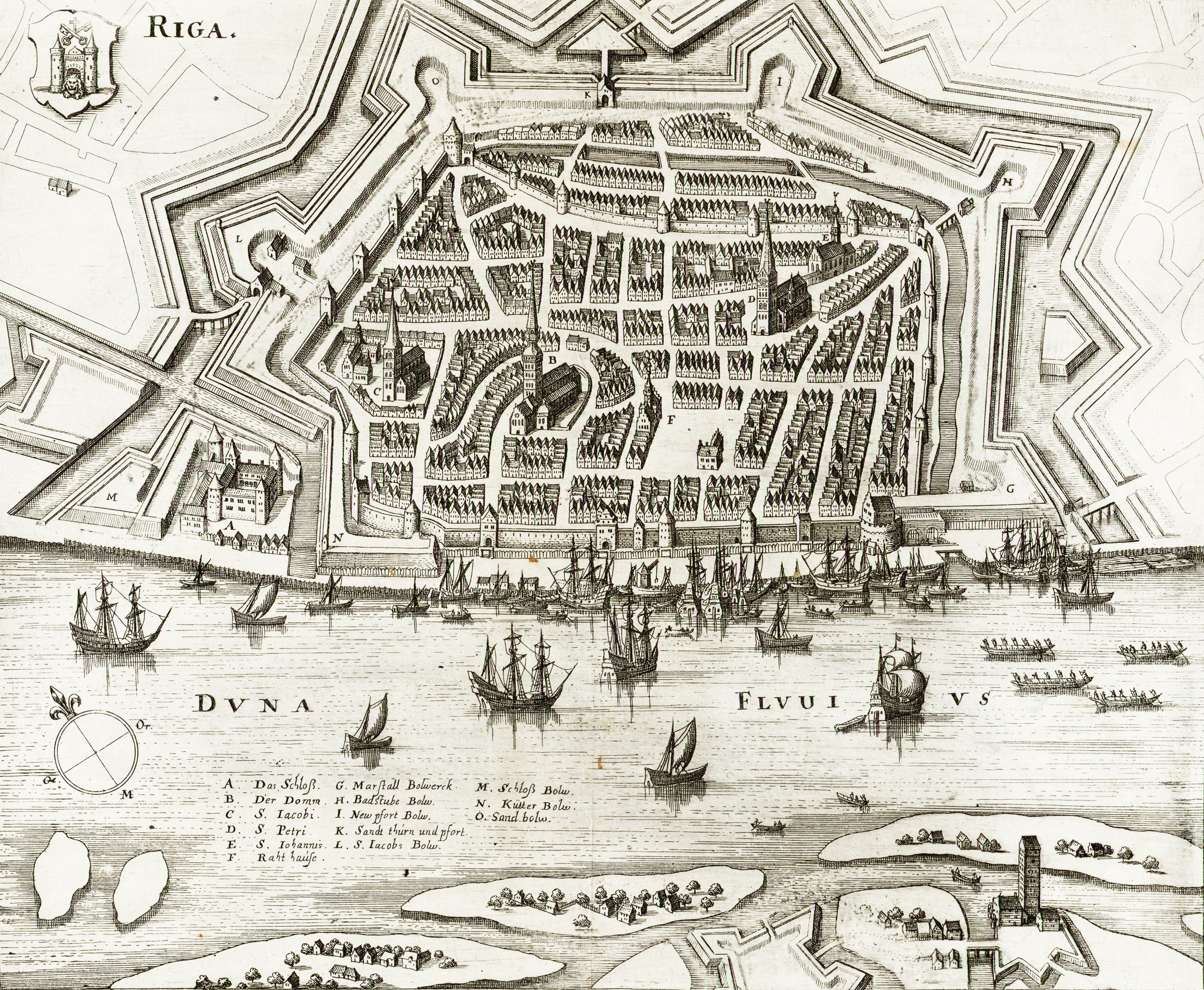
Map of Riga in 1637

From its foundation in 1201, Riga always had a fortification wall system surrounding it. In the 16th and 17th centuries a new type of defensive system, the bastion fort, was developed to protect the town against artillery attack. The territory of present Old Riga was surrounded by an earthen rampart. Positioned at the corners of the rampart and the major gates were projecting polygonal fortifications – bastions. In the moat in front of these, ravelins were built, artificial fortified triangular islands. A separate fortress, the Citadel on the bank of the Daugava downstream from Riga Castle, provided additional protection. All this made Riga one of the strongest fortified centres on the eastern shore of the Baltic Sea.

Over time, the fortification systems were improved. The outer walls of the defenses were faced with stone blocks, the moat was broadened and forward defences were added in front of the rampart.

As firearms became more powerful, the fortifications gradually lost their importance and began to hinder urban development. Between 1857 and 1864 the wall was taken down. Only part of the moat was preserved to form the city canal, and an artificial mound, called Bastejkalns, was thrown up at the site of the former Sand Bastion.

The Triangular Bastion, the smallest but highest of the bastions, was constructed in 1727. The fortification was pentagonal in plan, open on the side facing the town. The width of the Bastion at the city rampart reached 61 metres, while the distance from the rampart to the outermost point was 35 meters. The bastion wall was 7 – 8 metres high, built at an angle of 50 – 70 degrees. It was faced with blocks of pink and grey dolomite. Behind the decorative blocks, the 2,1 metres thick wall itself was built of rough grey dolomite. Inside the fortified area, there was another, inner wall repeating the shape of the outer wall and separated from it by a distance of 5 – 11 metres. The space between the walls was filled with sand.

== Current situation ==
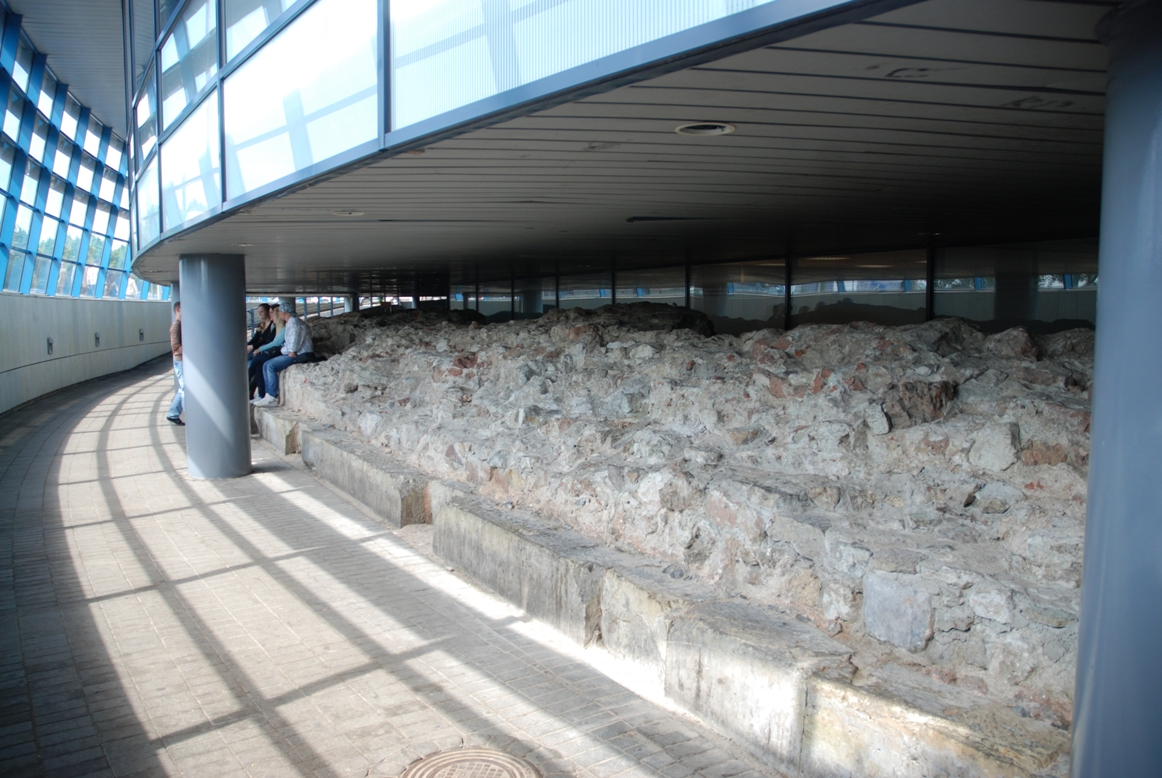
16 Century wall in 21 Century building

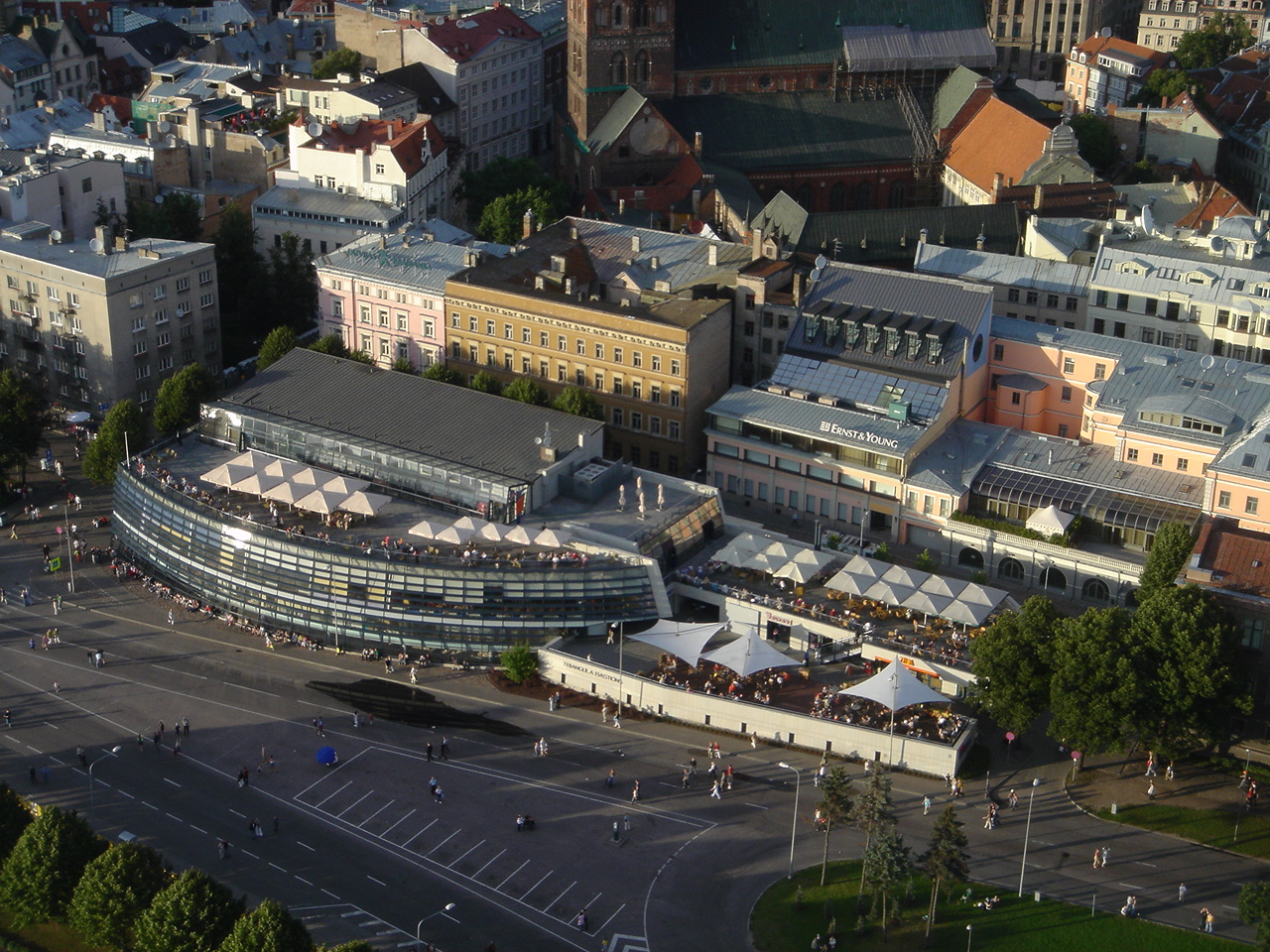
Triangula Bastion

When construction of a new shopping mall was initiated in 2000, the remains of old fortification walls were found. The Triangular Bastion was excavated by the AIG Company under the direction of the Museum of the History of Riga and Navigation and Mārtiņš Lūsēns. As a result, the Triangular Bastion is the most extensively investigated part of Riga’s 17th–19th-century fortification system, the remains of which were preserved inside the new building.

When the new glass building was built, there were strong opinions about the building's architectural style. For people who had spent 50 years under the rule of Soviet Union and were not used to modern architecture, the new building was shocking.

The building has large terraces with views of the riverside. For more than five years these terraces were not accessible to the public. Eventually, as Riga became more friendly and attractive for tourists, the management of the Triangular Bastion decided to open the terraces.

Nearly all Riga city celebrations take place on the riverbank of the Daugava, the place where Triangular Bastion stands.
