= St. Saviour's Church, Riga =

Anglican church in Central District, Latvia

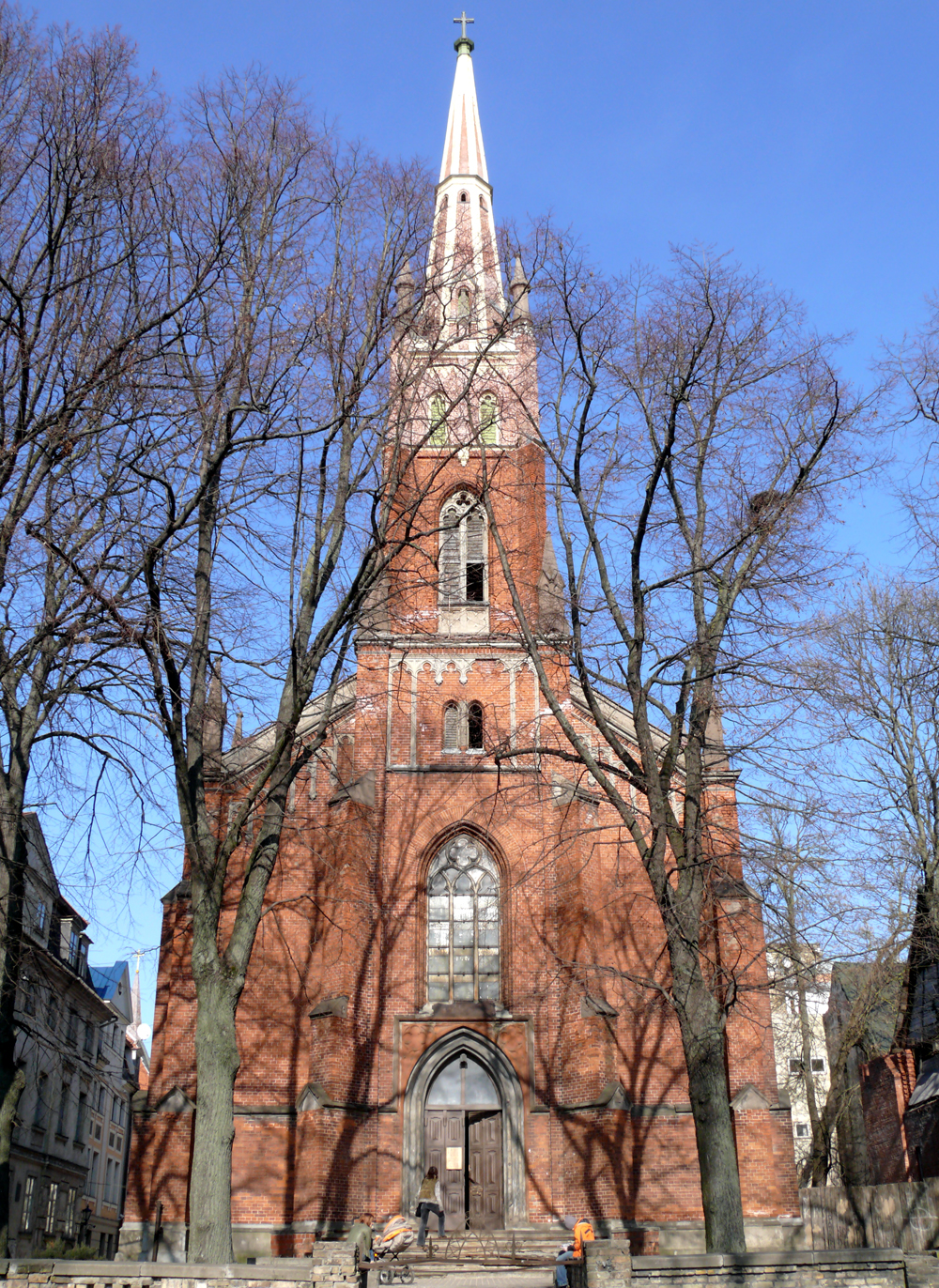

Religion
- Affiliation: Church of England
- District: Diocese in Europe
- Leadership: The Reverend Elīza Zikmane
- Year consecrated: 1859

Location
- Location: Riga, Latvia
- Interactive map of St. Saviour's Church, Riga
- Coordinates: 56.949714°N 24.101919°E

Architecture
- Architect: Johann Felsko
- Type: Church
- Style: Victorian Gothic
- Completed: 1859
- Materials: Brick

Website
- Anglican Church in Riga

St. Saviour's Church (Latvian: Anglikāņu Sv. Pestītāja baznīca) is a congregation of the Church of England in Riga, Latvia. Its parish church is located at Anglikāņu iela 2. This is to the north of the old town centre (Vecrīga), close to Riga Castle and the banks of the Daugava River.

The neo-Gothic church was designed by Johann Felsko. The foundation stone was laid in 1857 and the church was consecrated on 26 July 1859 by Bishop Walter Trower. In 1897 Heaton von Sturmer became chaplain, succeeding Dean Harris; he stayed in Riga until December 1918, when in the face of Russian Bolshevik invasion, he left Latvia in a British warship.

Church use was halted during the Soviet occupation, and in 1973 it became the home of the Riga Polytechnic Institute student club.

After Latvia regained its independence in 1991, an English-speaking congregation was again formed under the guidance of Lutheran Pastor Arden Haug. In 1995 the Latvian-born Reverend Dr Juris Calitis became the pastor of a growing congregation. Jāna Jēruma-Grīnberga was installed as priest-in-charge in October 2014, succeeding Cālītis. Elīza Zikmane became chaplain in 2020.

The church operates a soup kitchen for homeless people in the undercroft, and supports a club for the elderly (Senioru klubs).

Historical records are held in London Metropolitan Archives.

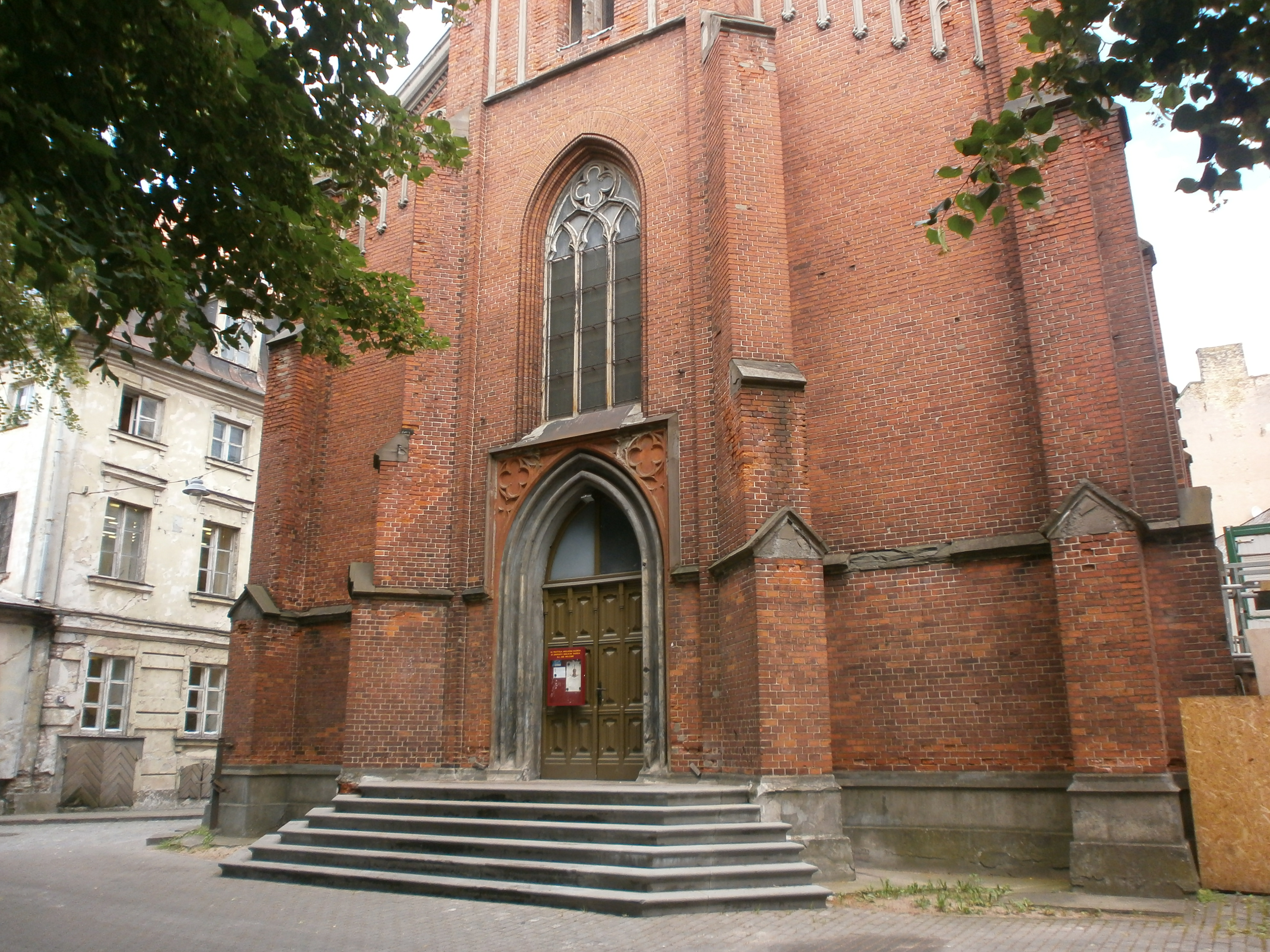
The west door

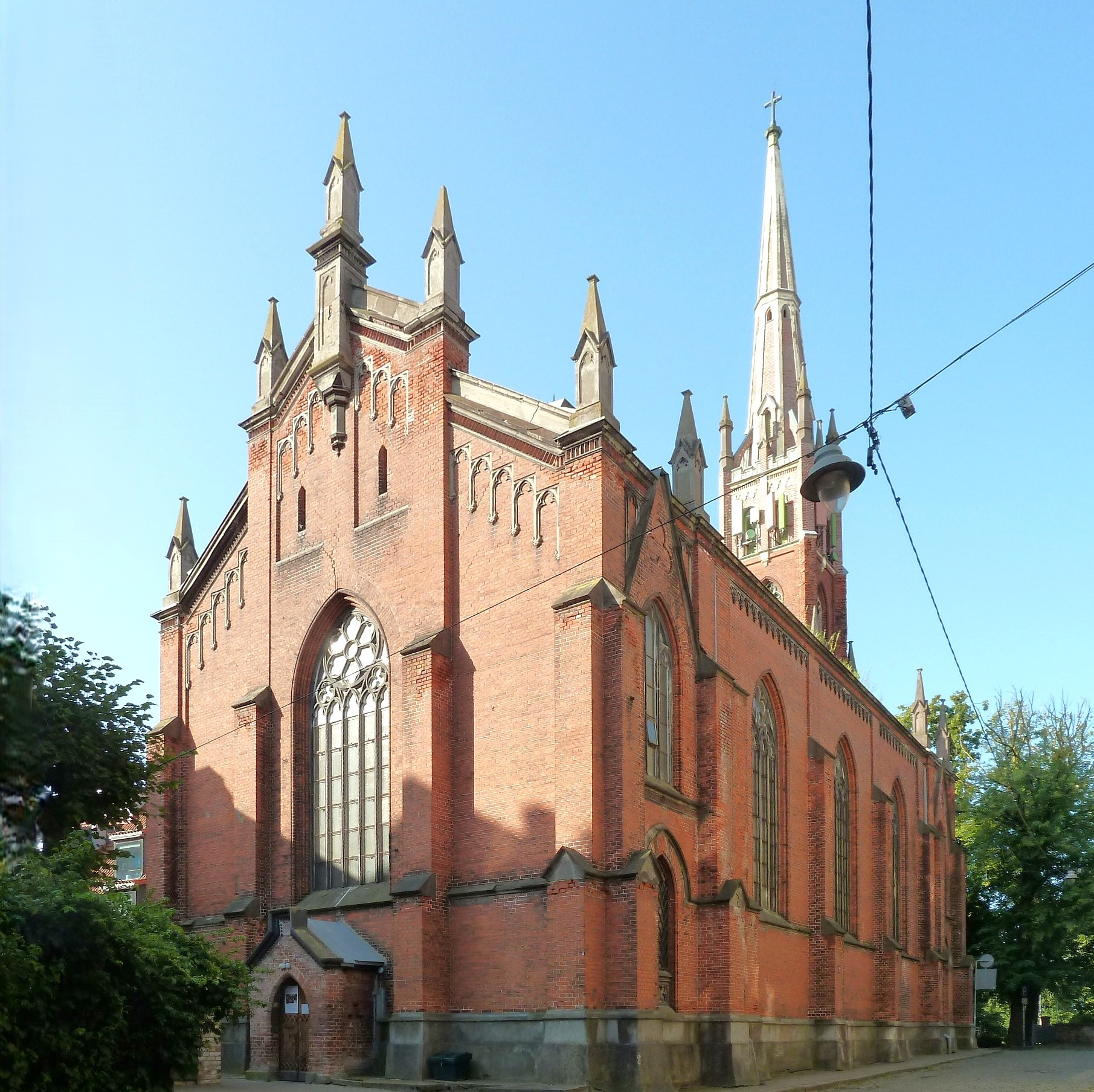
From the east

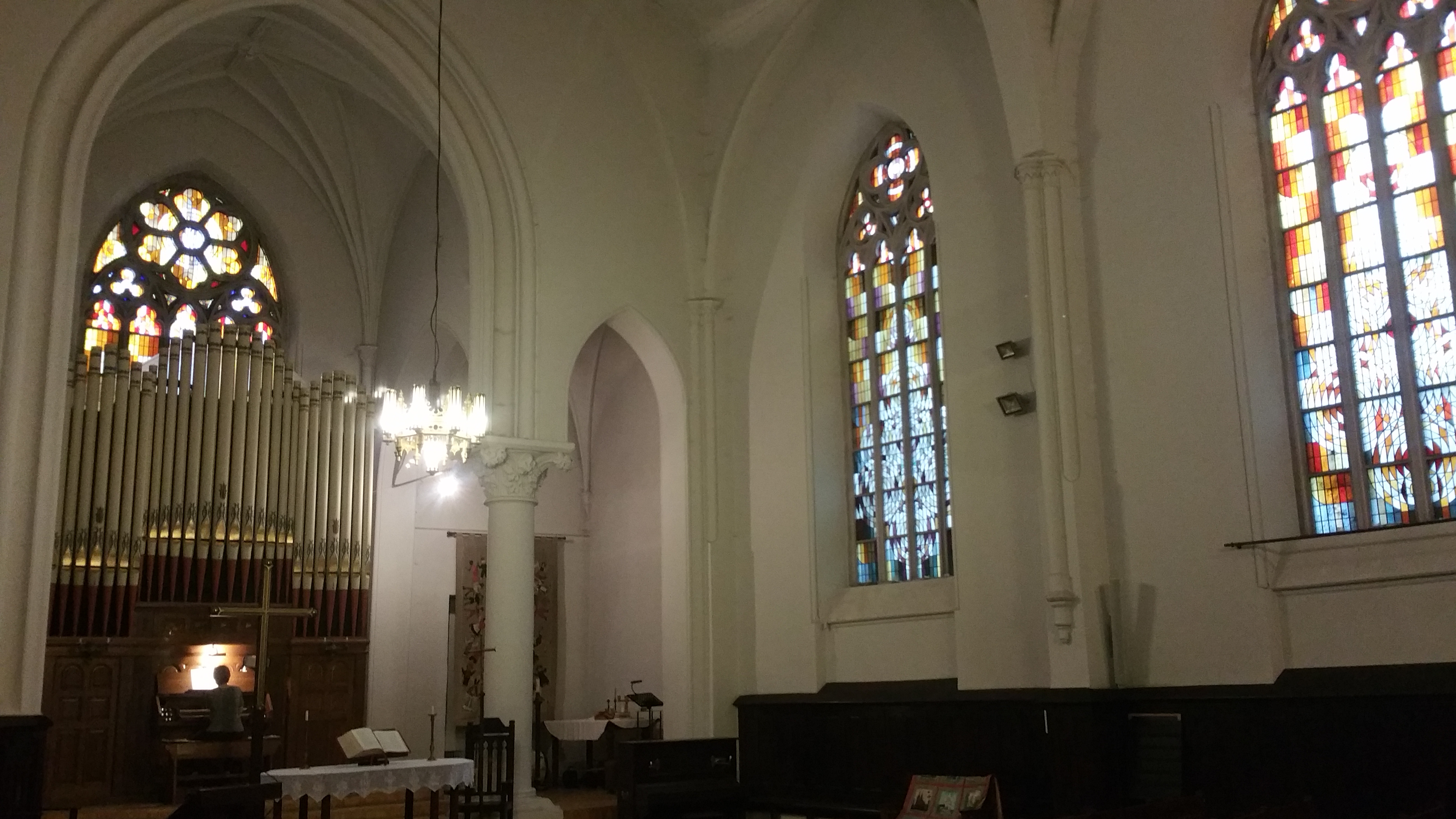
Church interior

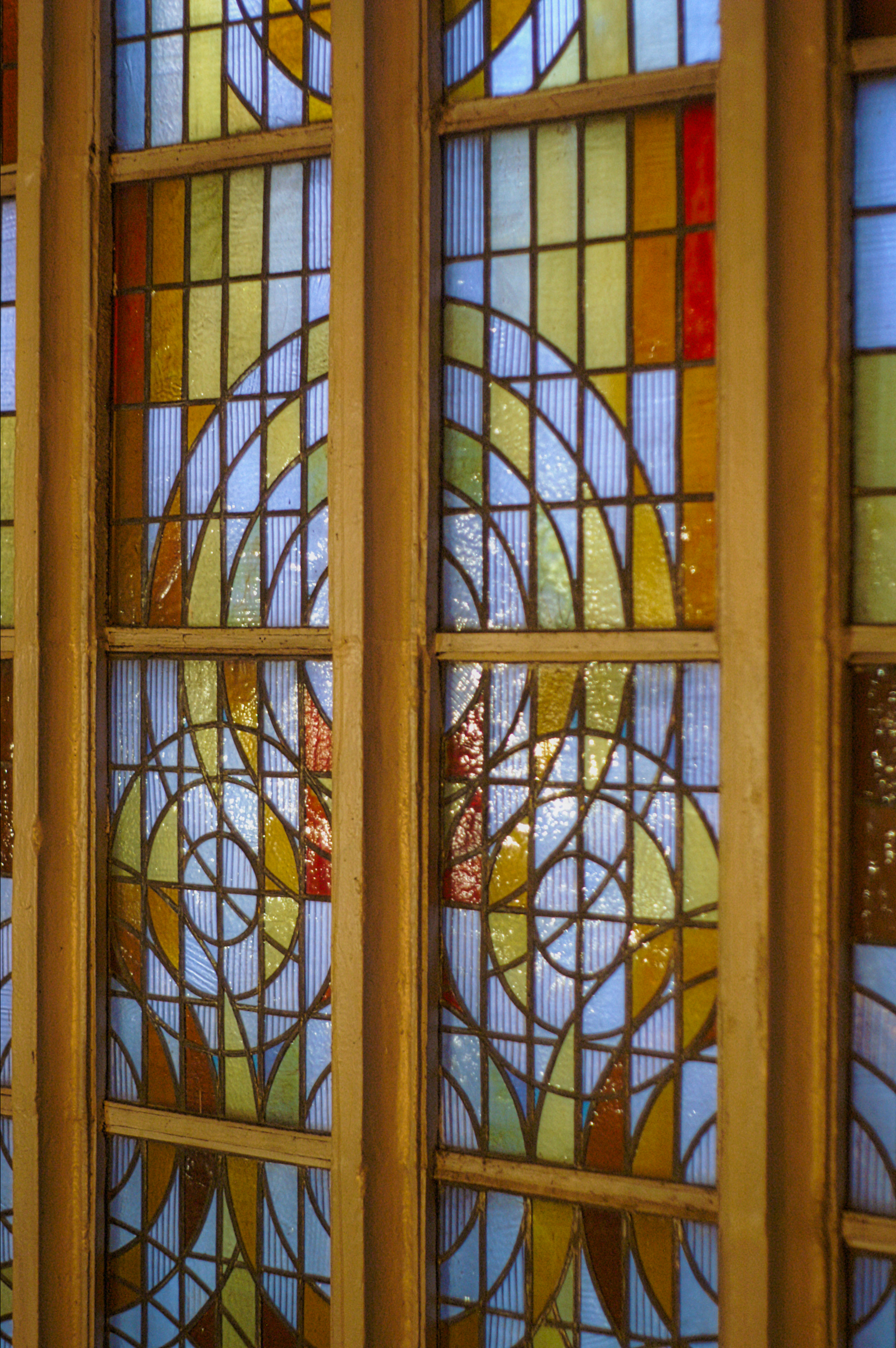
Window at St Saviour's
