= Jāna Jēruma-Grīnberga =

British-Latvian priest

Jāna Jēruma-Grīnberga (born London, 1953) is the priest-in-charge of St Saviour’s Anglican Church in Riga, Latvia and was the first woman to become a bishop in Britain.

Jēruma-Grīnberga is the daughter of the Latvian composer Alberts Jērums and was born in England. She studied biochemistry at University College London and trained to become a nurse before feeling called to the priesthood, studying at North Thames Ministerial Training Course at Oak Hill Theological College and being ordained in 1997. She was a pastor in the Latvian Evangelical Lutheran Church Abroad in Great Britain.

She served as the bishop of the Lutheran Church in Great Britain, taking office in January 2009. As such, she was the first woman to become a bishop in Britain. Christina Rees, chair of Women and the Church, welcomed her appointment as the campaign for women to be ordained bishops in the Church of England was not yet successful. Ishmael Noko, general secretary of the Lutheran World Federation, also welcomed the news.

Jēruma-Grīnberga is a trustee of the Council of Lutheran Churches. She was one of the six presidents of Churches Together in England between 2010 and 2014, the other five presidents being the Archbishop of Canterbury Justin Welby, the Cardinal Archbishop of Westminster Vincent Nichols, Archbishop Gregorios Theocharous of Thyateira and Great Britain, the Revd Michael Heaney (Free Churches' Moderator), and Bishop Eric Brown (Pentecostal). From 2009 to 2013, she was co-moderator of the Anglican Lutheran Society, together with Anglican bishop Rupert Hoare.

She was installed as the priest-in-charge of St Saviour’s Anglican Church in Riga, Latvia, in October 2014, succeeding Juris Cālītis.

== See also ==
- Alison Elliot in 2004 became the first female to become moderator of the General Assembly in the Church of Scotland.
