= Ishmael Noko =

Southern African Lutheran priest (born 1943)

Ishmael Noko (born 1943) is a southern African Lutheran priest who was the General Secretary of the Lutheran World Federation (LWF) from 1994 to 2010.

== Biography ==
Born on 29 October 1943 in then Rhodesia (now Zimbabwe), Noko received his primary and high-school education locally. He pursued his theological studies at the University of South Africa in Pretoria, and at the University of Zululand. He completed his Bachelor of Arts degree in 1971, majoring in systematic theology, church history and biblical studies.

After his ordination in 1972, he studied for a Master's degree at the Lutheran Theological Seminary, Saskatoon, Saskatchewan, Canada, and completed in 1974 with a thesis on "Communion of Saints from the African Perspective."

From 1974 until 1977, Noko studied at McGill University in Quebec and earned his Ph.D. with a doctoral thesis entitled "The Concept of God in Black Theology: An Appreciation of God as Liberator and Reconciler."

During his studies in Canada, Noko worked as a university lecturer, as well as a parish pastor at Good Shepherd Lutheran Church in Saint-Lambert, QC. In late 1977, he accepted a lectureship at the University of Botswana where, two years later, he was appointed head of the Department of Theology/Religious Studies. He also served for three years as Dean of the Faculty of Humanities.

In 2018 Noko was awarded the UC Distinguished Professorship in Peace Studies from the University of Cambodia for promoting peace and development and for striving to improve the quality of life of citizens around the world.

== Lutheran World Federation service ==
In May 1982, Noko was called from the University of Botswana to join the Department for World Service of the Lutheran World Federation (LWF), where he worked for refugee services related to the churches, the United Nations High Commissioner for Refugees, the Organization of African Unity and other organizations.

In June 1994 Noko was appointed as general secretary of the LWF, becoming the first African to hold the position.

The Council of the Lutheran World Federation re-elected Rev. Dr Ishmael Noko for his second seven-year term as the LWF General Secretary, during the international meeting held in Geneva, Switzerland, on 1 September 2004.

Reverend Noko took part in the theological discussions that led to the signing of the Joint Declaration on the Doctrine of Justification.

In 2009 Noko welcomed the appointment of Jana Jeruma-Grinberga to succeed Walter A. Jagucki as bishop of the Lutheran Church in Great Britain, the first woman bishop in the UK.
