= Alberts Jērums =

Latvian composer

Alberts Jērums (1919, Karula Parish – 1978) was a noted Latvian composer. His daughter, Jāna Jēruma-Grīnberga (a Lutheran) was consecrated a bishop in 2009; the first woman to become a bishop in UK history.
