= Latvian Museum of National History =

Museum in Riga, Latvia

- Latvijas Nacionālais vēstures muzejs

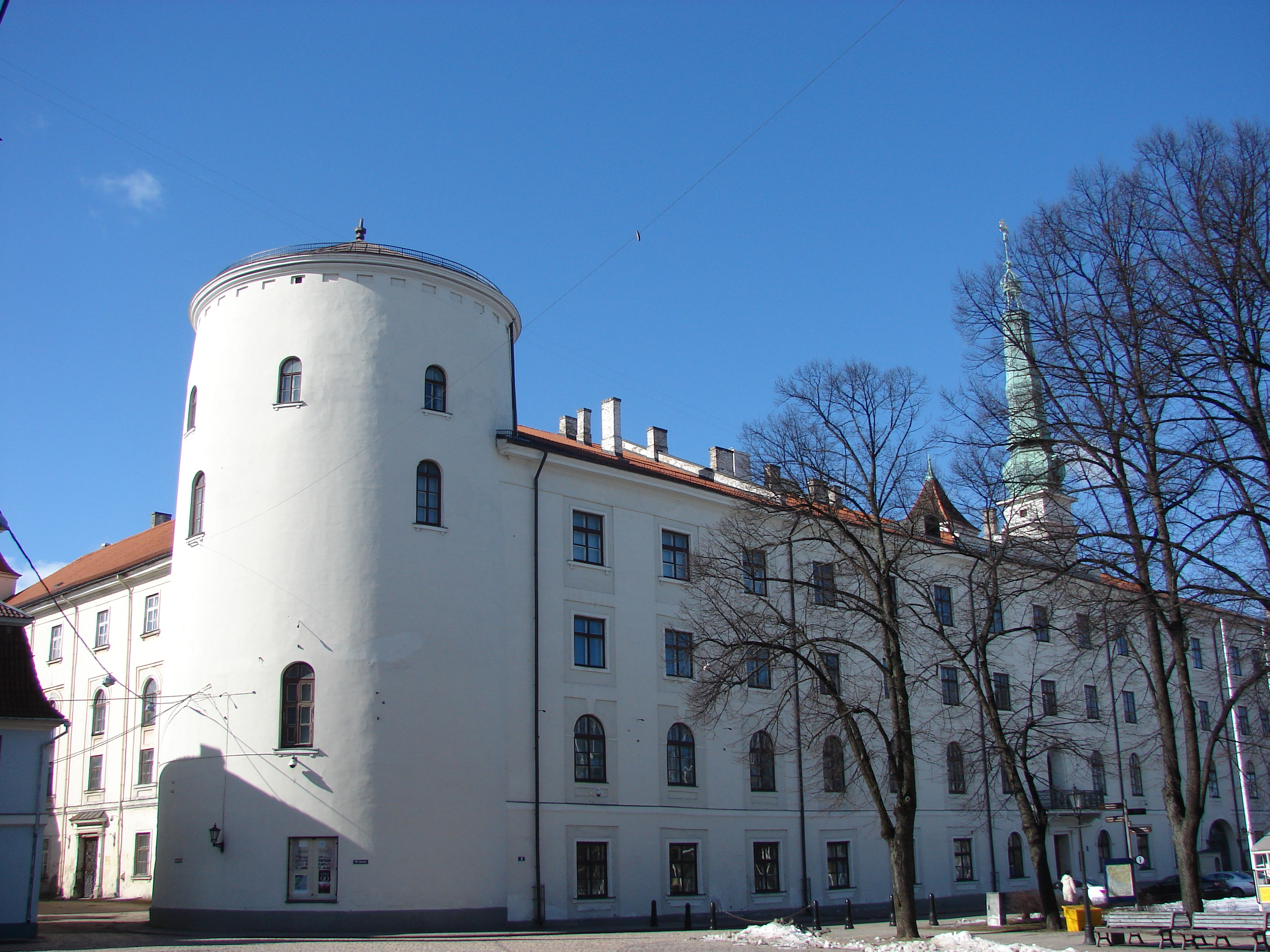
- Riga Castle
- Interactive fullscreen map
- Established: 1869; 157 years ago
- Location: Pulka iela 8, Rīga, Latvia
- Coordinates: 56°57′30″N 24°03′58″E
- Type: Historical museum
- Website: Official website

The Latvian National Museum of History (Latvian: Latvijas Nacionālais vēstures muzejs), is a national history museum in Riga, Latvia.

It was founded in 1869 by the Riga Latvian Society.

Since 1920 it has been located in Riga Castle and in 1924 it attained state museum status. Its mission is "to collect, preserve, research and popularise spiritual and material culture from Latvia and the world from ancient times until today, which has archaeological, ethnographic, numismatic, historical or artistic significance, in the interests of the Latvian nation and its people".

== Departments ==
- Riga Castle, Pils laukums 3, Rīga (entrance from Daugavas gāte)
- Dauderi Villa, Zāģeru iela 7, Rīga
- Popular Front Museum, Vecpilsētas iela 13/15, Rīga
- Museum Storage, Pulka iela 8, Rīga

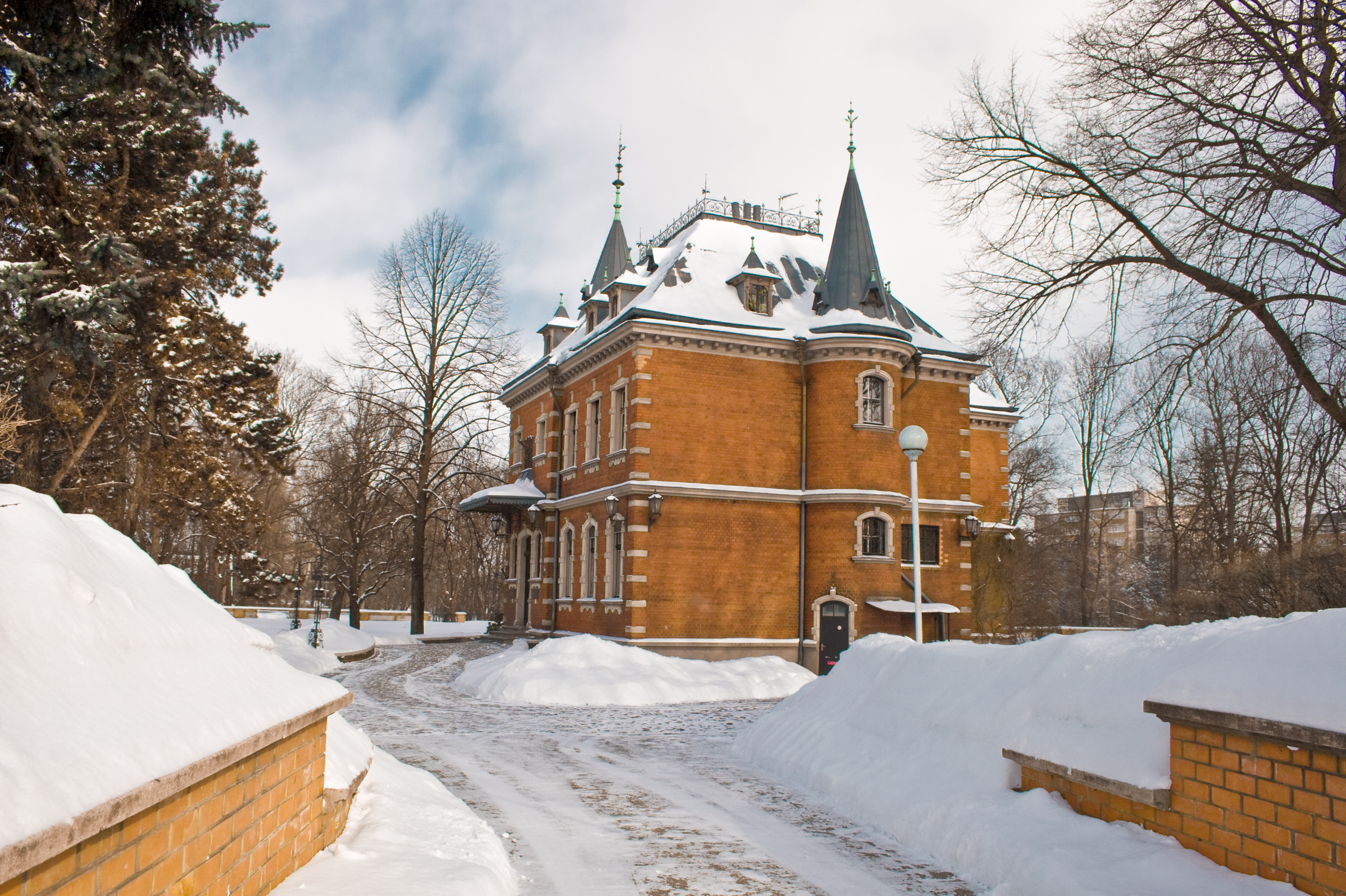
Dauderi

From 21 March 2026, the museum at Riga Castle reopened to visitors with the exhibition Streaming Time and restored rooms of the castle. After the first phases of the reconstruction project, 4,400 square metres of Riga Castle were open to the public, including the refectory, the chapel and the four-storey Lead Tower.

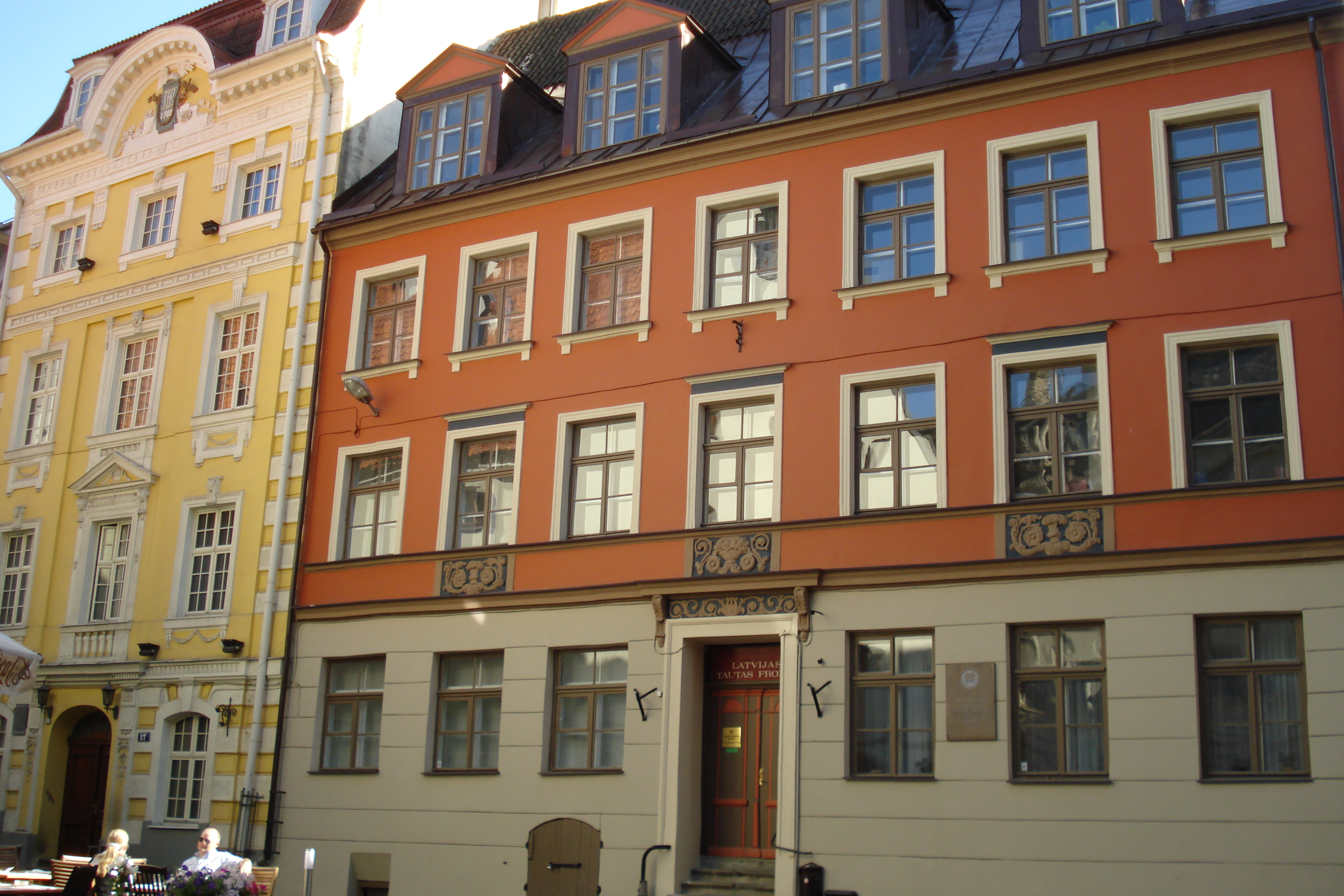
Popular Front Museum

The Āraiši Archaeological Park was a part of the LNMH from March 2008 until February 2017. In 2010, the Latvian Culture Museum “Dauderi”, located in a historical villa in Sarkandaugava, Riga, was added to the Museum.

In January 2015, the Popular Front Museum with its collection of historical evidence of Latvia’s recent past was added to the LNMH.
