= Riga Castle =

Castle in Riga, Latvia

Coordinates: 56°57′03.42″N 24°06′2.29″E

- Rīgas pils
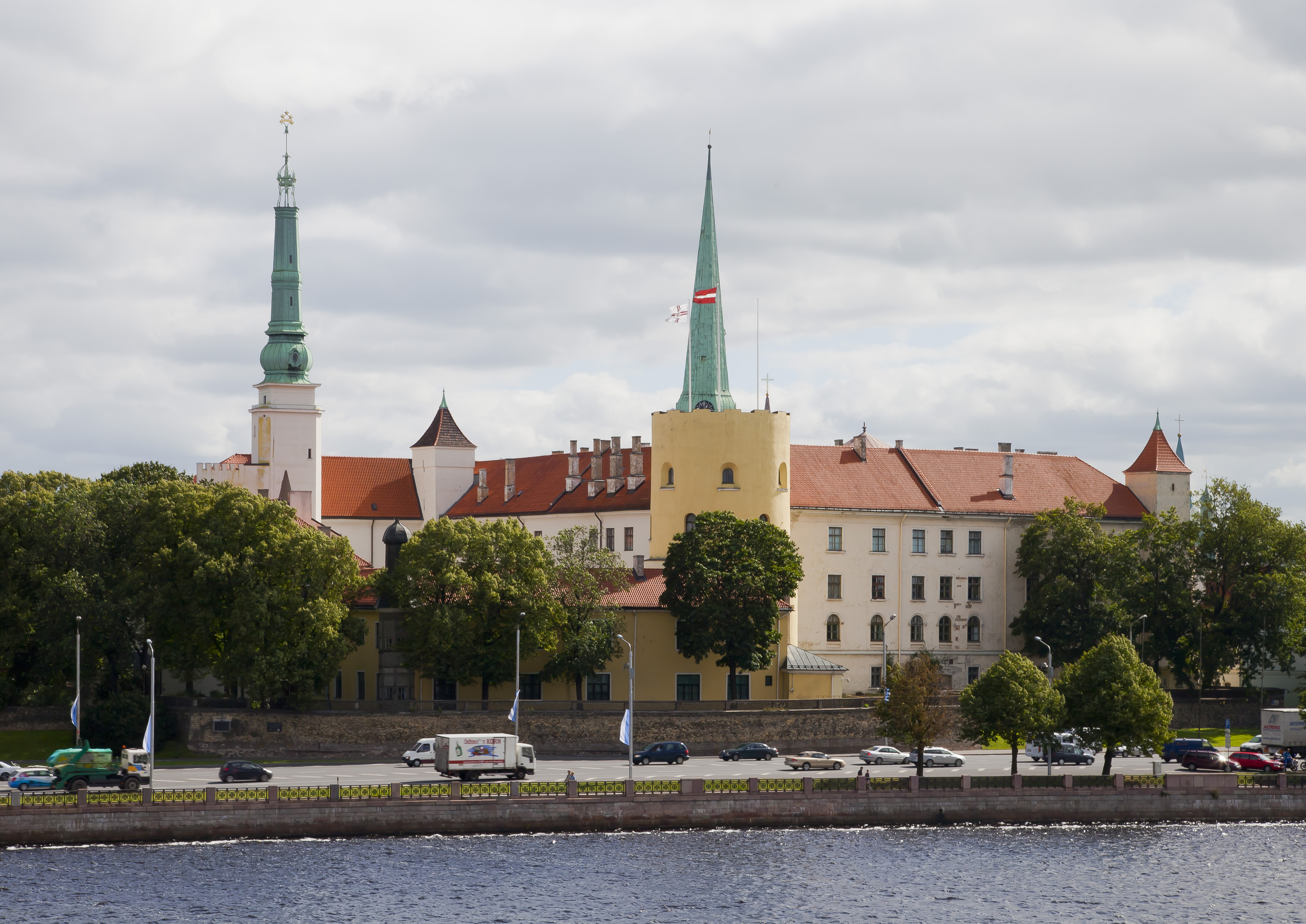
- Riga Castle overlooking 11 November Embankment

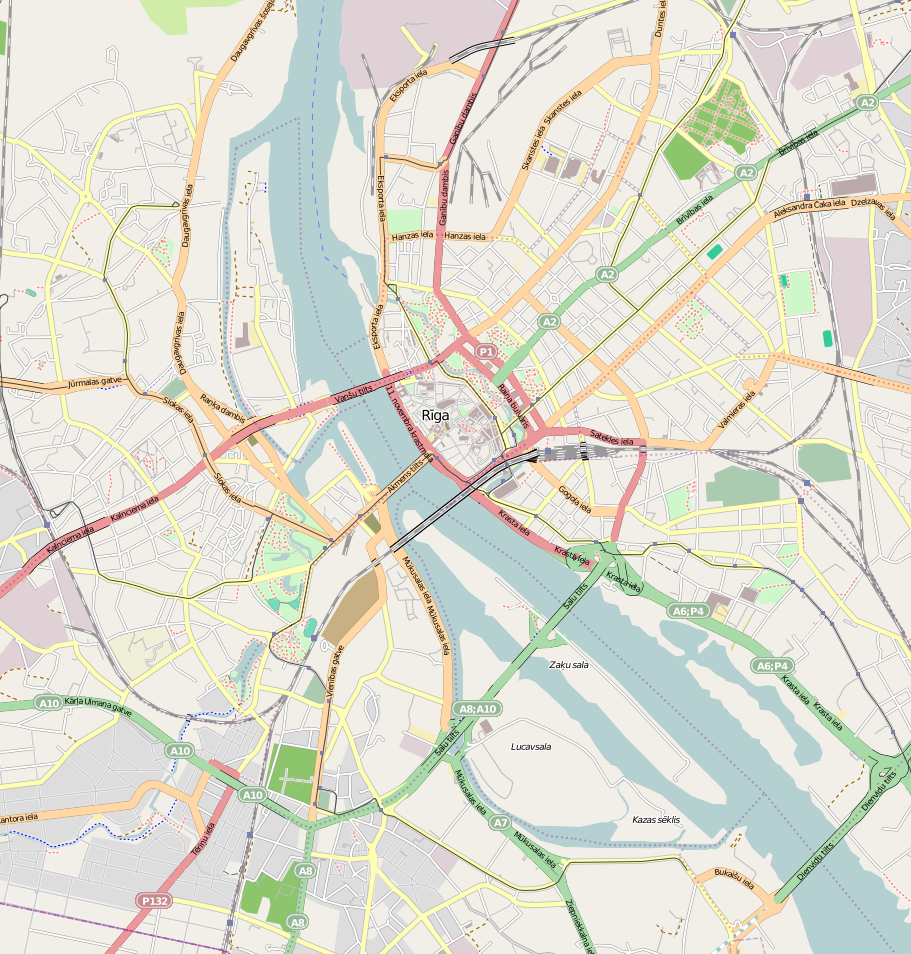
- Location within Riga
- Interactive map of the Riga Castle area

General information
- Architectural style: Late Classicism
- Location: Riga, Latvia
- Construction started: 1497
- Completed: 1515
- Renovated: 2012–2016
- Owner: Republic of Latvia

Website
- www.president.lv

Riga Castle (Latvian: Rīgas pils) is a castle on the banks of River Daugava in Riga, the capital of Latvia. The castle was founded in 1330. Its structure was thoroughly rebuilt between 1497 and 1515. Upon the castle's seizure by the Swedes, they constructed spacious annexes in 1641. The fortress was continually augmented and reconstructed between the 17th and 19th centuries. Sometime in the 1930s, some renovation work was done by architect Eižens Laube. The Latvian government declared the castle its residence in 1938. Today it is the official residence of the President of Latvia as well as home to several museums.

== History ==
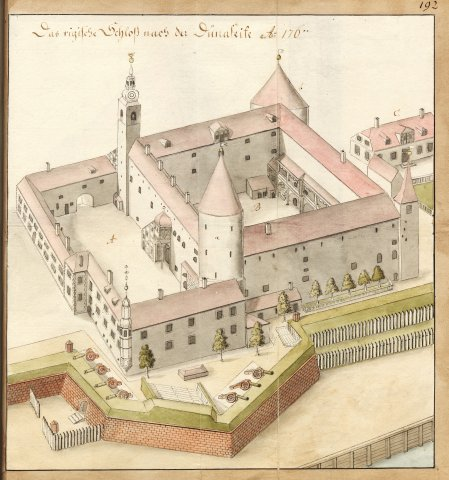
Riga Castle as expanded in 1600s.

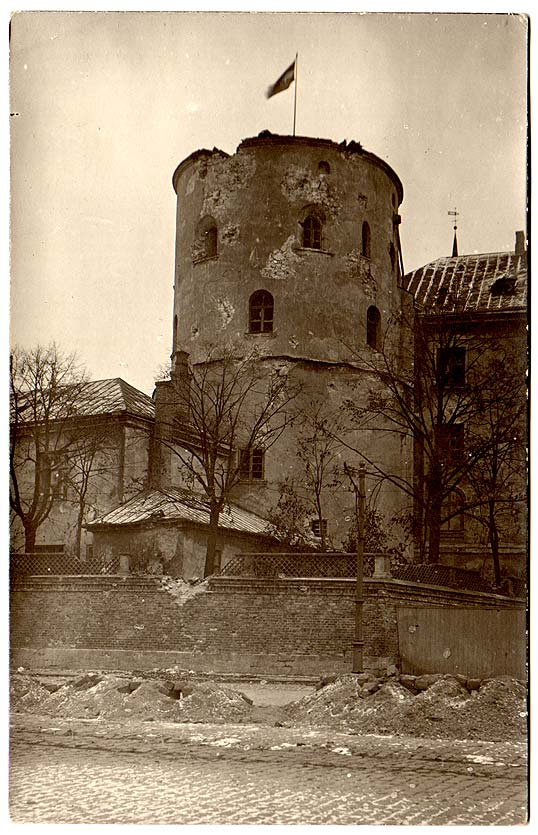
Riga Castle in 1919 after heavy shelling by the West Russian Volunteer Army during the Latvian War of Independence

The castle was built based on a treaty between Riga and the Livonian Order, who consisted of the remainders of the Livonian Brothers of the Sword and were by then part of the German Order – in the 13th century Rigans had rebelled against the Order and demolished its original castle in the centre of the town. Due to constant conflict with Rigans the Order chose to build a new castle beyond the borders of the town rather than to rebuild the original castle. The site occupied by Convent of the Saint Spirit – a hospital and shelter for the poor – was chosen and the convent moved to the location of the original castle. The castle served as the residence of the Master of the Livonian Order, but due to continuous conflicts with Rigans the residence was moved to the Castle of Cēsis sometime before the castle was destroyed by Rigans in 1484. The Rigans eventually lost the fight and were forced to rebuild the castle – the restoration was finished in 1515. After the 1561 Treaty of Vilnius, the order ceased to exist and the castle became a Lithuanian, and in 1569 a Polish-Lithuanian stronghold. In 1621 Riga came under Swedish rule and the castle was used to house the Swedish administration.

After the city came under the Russian Empire in the early 18th century, the castle housed the administration and courts of the Riga Governorate (which included most of present Latvia and Estonia) and served as residence of Governors General.

Since 1922 the castle became residence of the President of Latvia.

After Soviet occupation, the castle housed the Council of People Commissars of the Latvian SSR in 1940–1941. In 1941, the Young Pioneer organization of the Soviet Union established a Pioneers Palace in the northern part of the castle.

Several museums are housed in the southern part of the castle. After the independence of Latvia was restored the northern part of the Castle became the residence of the President of Latvia.

== Architecture ==
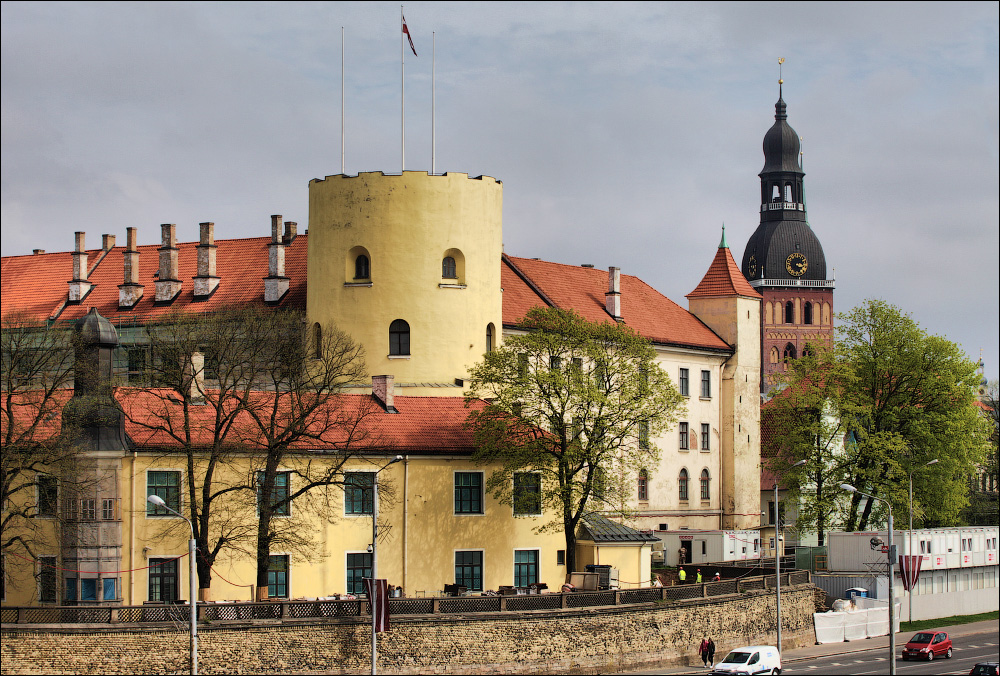
Corner view of Riga Castle in September 2014

The original Castle was a three-floor building which enclosed a rectangular courtyard and had four rectangular towers in its corners. After the Castle was demolished in 1484 it was rebuilt with two towers replaced by round towers following the latest developments of military technologies. The Castle experienced vast development during 17th century when it was almost constantly under construction. In 1682 Arsenal was attached to the castle, it was torn down about one hundred years later, in 1783 to build a court/house.

== 2013 fire incident ==
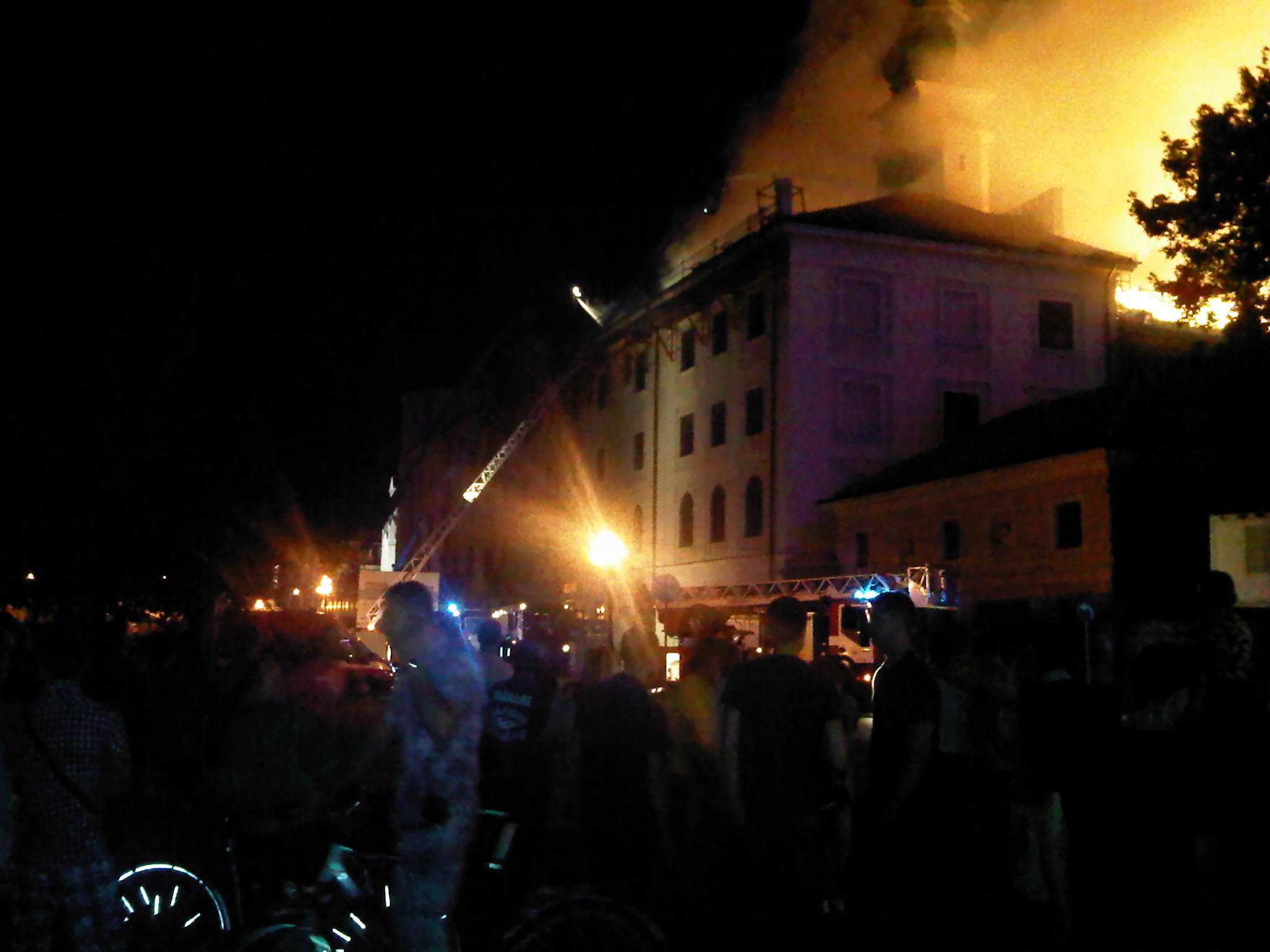
Sight of dozens gathering outside the castle while firefighters are fighting the blaze.

The builders who worked on the reconstruction of the Riga Castle, which began in December 2012, left work at 18:45. Around 22:21 on the night of 20 June 2013, fire broke out in the castle and the firefighters were called in. The castle was guarded by the military police.

After midnight authorities declared the fire reached the highest level, being seen across the Daugava river. Around 1 am, the State Fire and Rescue Service (SFRS) reported that 79 rescuers, 11 tanks, 3 ladders, 1 platform and 3 specialized vehicles were involved in the operation, and that one firefighter, who was poisoned by the smoke, had been hospitalized. Shortly before 2 a.m, the roof of the castle was no longer visible, engulfed by the flames. At 3:53 in the morning the source of the fire was spotted, and at 4:45 a.m. the traffic was restored on the 11 November Embankment, between Stone and Vanšu bridges.

The Riga agency of State Fire and Rescue Service gathered all resources available, including aid from the Jūrmala fire department. The military police Corporal Alvis Brūveris lowered the Latvian flag in the castle, to be raised back on Friday by the senior military policeman First Class Officer Aldis Dortāns. Latvian President Andris Bērziņš described the fire as a "national tragedy" during a morning visit to inspect the damage.

=== Damage ===
Riga Castle on the day after the fire emergency service firefighters estimate that around 3,200 square meters of the castle was destroyed, being 2,400 square meters of the palace roof and the attic, 600 square meters on the fourth floor and 200 square meters on the third. The Red Hall was almost completely burnt, the White Hall was severely damaged, and the State Festival, Ambassador Accreditation and Coats of Arms halls have all been damaged. The most solid part of the castle, which housed the Chancellery of the President, and the Latvian Art Museum have also been affected, with exception of the National History Museum. Riga Castle is insured for a total of 27.3 million Lats.

During the fire there were wide concerns spreading on social media about the status of unique museum collections located at the Castle. None of the collections were destroyed by the fire, however parts of them were damaged by water.
