= Aleksandra Briede =

Latvian sculptor (1901–1992)

- Born: July 25, 1901; Libau, Courland Governorate, Russian Empire
- Died: November 14, 1992 (aged 91); Riga, Latvia
- Occupation: Sculptor

Aleksandra Briede (née Kalniņa; 25 July 1901, in Liepāja – 14 November 1992, in Riga) was a Latvian sculptor, best remembered for her work in the field of portrait sculpture. She is best known for her sculptures of Rainis in 1956, of Pauls Stradiņš at the Pauls Stradiņš Clinical University Hospital in 1963, and tombstone of Pēteris Pauls Jozuus in 1937. For a sculpture of Vladimir Lenin, she was invested with the Order of Lenin in 1956.
