= Latvian Biomedical Research and Study centre =

Research centre in Riga, Latvia

Latvian Biomedical Research and Study Centre
- Founder: Dr. habil. biol. Elmārs Grēns
- Established: 1993
- Address: Ratsupītes iela 1
- Location: Riga, Latvia
- Website: http://biomed.lu.lv/en/

Latvian Biomedical Research and Study Centre (LBMC) is the scientific institute in molecular biology and biomedicine in Latvia. Since its establishment in 1993 it has evolved into a scientific centre performing basic as well as applied research in molecular genetics, vaccine development, genomics and proteomics, cancer biology, immunology, biotechnology, stem cell biology, structure biology and other scientific areas.

== History ==
First in 1993 under leadership of Professor Elmārs Grēns Biomedical Research and Study Centre of the University of Latvia (LU BMC) was established by merge of several research groups from the Latvian Academy of Sciences (LAS), Molecular Biology Institute of University of Latvia and LAS Microbiology Institute. Since 2006, the LBMC is an independent state research institution, but it continues to work in close collaboration with the University of Latvia and other universities in scientific and educational areas. At the beginning scientific personnel of LBMC consisted of 45 researchers, that carried out research in fields of molecular virology, nucleic acid chemistry, virus like particles and molecular epidemiology of infectious diseases. In 2000, LU BMC established a long-term collaboration with the Swiss company „Cytos Biotechnology” Ltd. concerning research of virus structural gene exploration in order to construct virus like particles that could serve as vaccines or immunomodulating therapeutics. New research area of cancer immunology in LBMC developed with investigation of anti-cancer humoral immune response triggering proteins. In 2001, novel collaboration project financed by the Latvian Council of Science “Genofond research of population of Latvia and its application for human pathology diagnostics and prevention” begun that promoted research of human genetics in Latvia. That led to establishment of the Latvian Genome Data Base (LGDB) in 2006. The LGDB now contains over 17,000 samples that are available for research use for scientists of different research institutes. Since 2004, several projects were financed by the European Union structural funds. Significant development of infrastructure took place after financial support from the National Research Program. At the moment LBMC scientific personnel exceeds 100 and the main research areas are novel vaccine development, molecular virology, human genetics, epidemiology of infectious diseases, cancer biology and immunology, stem cell biology, structure biology and other fundamental as well as applied scientific fields.

== Research directions ==
- Human genetics
- Recombinant biotechnology
- Molecular virology
- Cancer research
- Epidemiology of infectious diseases
- Molecular pharmacology
- Stem cells
- Structural biology

== Funding ==
The research and infrastructure is supported by funding from the Latvian Council of Science, Ministry of Education and Science, various European funding programmes like the European Social Fund, European Regional Development Fund, as well as by industry. Considerable core facilities have been established for molecular and cell biology research.

== Related organizations ==
Latvian Biomedical Research and Study Centre has promoted the development of several related organizations like the Genome Database of Latvian Population, the Latvian Genome Centre, the Latvian Association of Human Genetics, Genera Ltd., Asla Biotech Ltd. and Cilmes šūnu tehnoloģijas Ltd. Currently, these organizations provide services in Latvia and foreign countries.

== Studies ==
In collaboration with higher education institutions the Latvian Biomedical Research and Study Centre participates in student education. Academic personnel of the LBMC conducts lecture courses at the University of Latvia, Riga Technical University and Riga Stradiņš University. Students from different universities carry out their bachelor, master or doctoral studies under supervision of LBMC specialists.

== Management ==
Head of the Scientific Council - Dr. biol. Andris Zeltiņš

Board of Directors

- Director of the Institute Dr. biol. Jānis Kloviņš
- Research Director Dr. biol. Aija Linē
- Education Director Dr. biol. Kaspars Tārs
