= Pauls =

Pauls may refer to:

- Pauls (given name)
- Pauls (surname)
- Pauls (dairy), Australian dairy brand name
- Paüls, municipality in Tarragona, Catalonia, Spain

== See also ==
- Paul (disambiguation)
- Pauls Agriculture
- Pauls Valley
- Paul's
