= Pauls (given name) =

Male given name

- Gender: Male

Origin
- Region of origin: Latvia

Other names
- Related names: Paul

Pauls is a Latvian masculine given name; a cognate of the name Paul. People bearing the name Pauls include:

- Pauls Butkēvičs (born 1940), Latvian actor
- Pauls Dauge (1869–1946), Latvian Bolshevik revolutionary activist and writer
- Pauls Kalniņš (1872–1945), Latvian physician and politician, former President of Latvia
- Pauls Kaņeps (1911–2006), Latvian cross-country skier
- Pauls Pujats (born 1991), Latvian pole vaulter and track and field athlete
- Pauls Putniņš (1937–2018), Latvian playwright, journalist and politician
- Pauls Sokolovs (1902–19??), Latvian footballer
- Pauls Stradiņš (1896–1958), Latvian professor, physician, and surgeon
- Pauls Stradiņš Jr (born 1963), Latvian-American physicist
- Pauls Svars (born 1998), Latvian ice hockey player
- Pauls Toutonghi (born 19??), American writer
- Pauls Valdens (1863–1957), Latvian chemist
