= Ināra (given name) =

Female given name

- Gender: Female
- Name day: May 12

Origin
- Region of origin: Latvia

Other names
- Related names: Inārs

Ināra is a Latvian feminine given name. The associated name day is May 12.

== Notable people named Ināra ==
- Ināra Mūrniece (born 1970), Latvian journalist and politician
- Ināra Rudko (born 1975), Latvian cross-country skier
- Ināra Tetereva (born 1953), Latvian patron of the arts and charity
