= Kirill Moskalenko =

Soviet military commander (1902–1985)

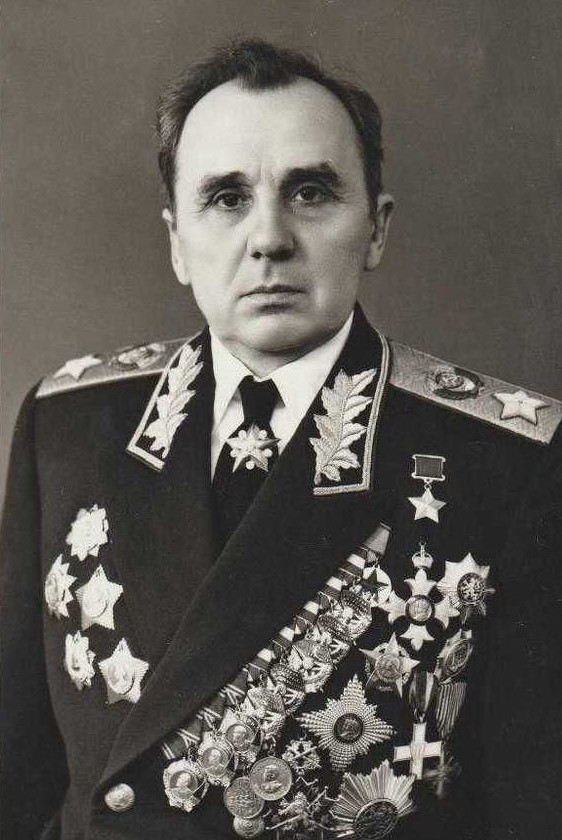
- Moskalenko in the c. 1950s
- Born: 11 May 1902; Grishino, Bakhmutsky Uyezd, Yekaterinoslav Governorate, Russian Empire
- Died: 17 June 1985 (aged 83); Moscow, Russian SFSR, Soviet Union
- Burial place: Novodevichy Cemetery
- Military career
- Allegiance: Soviet Union
- Service years: 1920–1985
- Rank: Marshal of the Soviet Union
- Commands: 38th Army; 40th Army; Moscow Military District; Strategic Missile Troops
- Conflicts: Russian Civil War; World War II; Winter War; Great Patriotic War; Defense of Kiev; Barvenkovo–Lozovaya offensive; Battle of Stalingrad; Battle of Kursk; Ostrogozhsk–Rossosh offensive; Third Battle of Kharkov; Battle of the Dnieper; Vistula–Oder offensive; Prague offensive
- Awards: Hero of the Soviet Union (twice)
- Other work: Commander of Strategic Rocket Forces

Kirill Semyonovich Moskalenko (Russian: Кирилл Семёнович Москаленко; Ukrainian: Кирило Семенович Москаленко, romanized: Kyrylo Semenovych Moskalenko; 11 May 1902 – 17 June 1985) was a Marshal of the Soviet Union. A member of the Soviet Army who fought in both the Russian Civil War and World War II, he later served as Commander in Chief of Strategic Missile Forces.

== Early life ==
Moskalenko was born in the village of Grishino, Bakhmutsky Uyezd, Yekaterinoslav Governorate, Russian Empire (now in Pokrovsk Raion, Donetsk Oblast, Ukraine), into a family of Ukrainian peasants. He graduated from a four-year primary rural school and two classes of the school of the ministerial school. From 1917 to 1919 he studied at an agricultural school in Bakhmut, where poet Volodymyr Sosiura studied at the same time according to his recollections. He was forced to interrupt his studies due to the outbreak of the Russian Civil War.

== Military career ==
=== Russian Civil War ===
He returned to his native village, where he worked in the rural revolutionary committee. When the province of his village was seized by the troops of the Volunteer Army of General Anton Denikin, he hid because of the threat of execution. After the occupation of the village by the troops of the Red Army in August 1920, he joined their ranks.

Moskalenko fought in the Civil War while serving as the member of the First Cavalry Army. He fought against the troops of General Pyotr Wrangel and Ataman Nestor Makhno.

=== Post civil war ===
He studied at the Luhansk Artillery School and at the 2nd Kharkov Artillery School. In May 1921, he was transferred to the artillery department of the Kharkov School of Red Officers, from which he graduated in 1922. Later, he graduated from the advanced training courses for the command personnel at the Red Army Artillery Academy in Leningrad and the faculty of advanced training for the higher command personnel of the Felix Dzerzhinsky Military Academy in Moscow Oblast. During his studies in Kharkov, as part of the school, he participated in battles against gangs in the Don and Donbas regions.

From 1922 to 1932 he served in the 6th Cavalry Division and First Cavalry Army, and platoon commander of the Cavalry Artillery Division. During his service in Armavir, he participated in battles against political banditry in the North Caucasus.

In September 1923, together with a military unit, he was transferred to Bryansk. From 1924, he served as a battery commander. He later served as commander of a training battery, artillery battalion, and chief of staff of an artillery regiment from 1928.

From 1932, he served as chief of staff and commander of a special cavalry division of the Special Red Banner Far Eastern Army near Chita. From 1934, he served as commander of a cavalry regiment. Moskalenko commanded the 23rd Tank Brigade in Primorsky Krai from 1935. From 1936 he served in the 45th Mechanized Corps within the Kiev Military District.

=== World War II ===
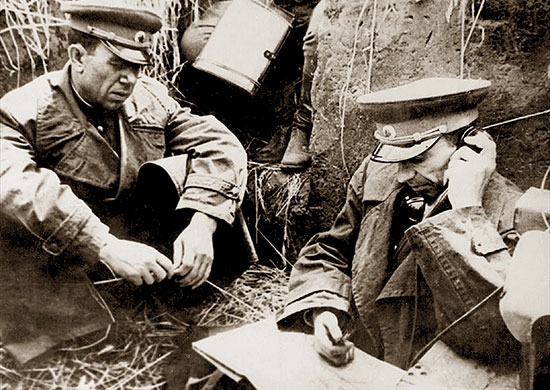
Moskalenko (left) with Alexei Yepishev at a command post (1944)

During the Soviet-Finnish War, he was the commander of artillery for the 51st Rifle Division and was awarded the Order of the Red Banner. He successively became chief of artillery of the 35th Rifle Corps and then the 2nd Mechanized Corps in Chișinău and Tiraspol respectively.

When Operation Barbarossa began in June 1941, Moskalenko was the commander of an anti-tank brigade which was stationed in Lutsk. Between June 1941 and March 1942, Moskalenko first held command of the 1st Anti-Tank Brigade, 15th Rifle Corps, 6th Army, and later of the 6th Cavalry Corps. During this time, he took part in the defensive battles in Lutsk, Volodymyr-Volynskyi, Rovno, Torchyn, Novohrad-Volynskyi and Malyn. Moskalenko participated in the Kiev Strategic Defensive Operation and fought in battles near Teterev, Pripyat, Dnieper and Desna. During a month of continuous fighting, being in the direction of the main attack of the enemy Army Group South, the brigade destroyed more than 300 enemy tanks. For military successes, courage and bravery, he was awarded the Order of Lenin on 23 July 1941.

In December 1941, he was appointed deputy commander of the 6th Army of the Southwestern Front and acting commander of the army. The 6th Army under the command of Moskalenko took part in the Barvenkovo-Lozovaya offensive and the liberation of the cities of Izium and Lozova. On 12 February 1942, he was appointed as commander of the 6th Cavalry Corps and from March to July 1942, he served as commander of the 38th Army. He was the commander of the newly reformed 38th Army from March to July 1942.

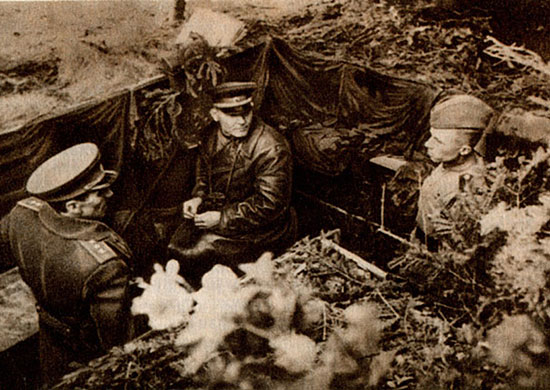
Moskalenko (left) with Marshal Ivan Konev (center) at a command post in the Carpathians (1945)

During the Battle of Stalingrad, he commanded the 1st Tank Army during which he participated in battles on the distant approaches to Stalingrad from July to August 1942. In August 1942, he was appointed commander of the 1st Guards Army until October 1942. At the very beginning of the defensive period of the Battle of Stalingrad, the 1st Tank Army attacked the enemy almost continuously for twelve days in a row and held back their advance. According to Moskalenko, at Kalach-on-Don, his army stopped the advance of German General Friedrich Paulus's 6th Army to Stalingrad and almost won a month to organize defense in depth and pull up reserves. He was then appointed commander of the 1st Tank Army from July to August 1942 and the 1st Guards Army from August to October 1942 before finally receiving command of the 40th Army, which was separate from the Voronezh Front, a position he held until October 1943.

Moskalenko led his troops during the winter counteroffensive and during the Battle of Kursk. He participated in the Ostrogozhsk–Rossosh offensive, third Battle of Kharkov and the Battle of the Dnieper. Moskalenko was awarded the title Hero of the Soviet Union for heroism and courage when crossing the Dnieper and securing a bridgehead on its western bank.

From October 1943 until the end of the war, Moskalenko was the commander of the 38th Army. He led his troops as they helped drive the Germans from Ukraine, Poland, and Czechoslovakia.

=== Post-World War II ===
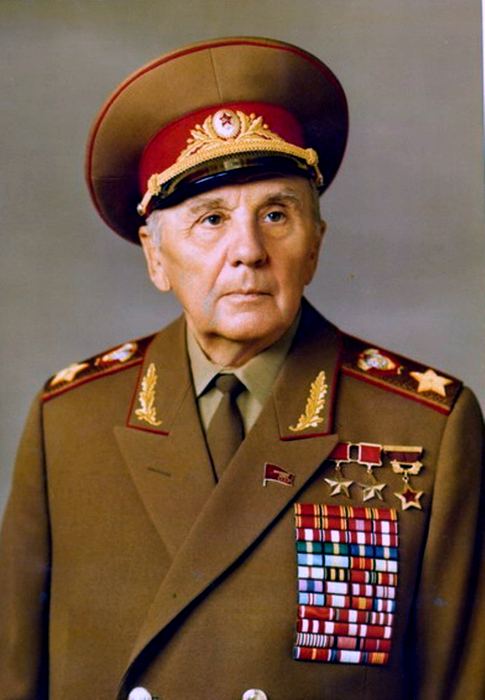
One of the last photos of the marshal

After the war, Moskalenko commanded the 38th Army, which was transferred to the Carpathian Military District. From August 1948, he served as commander of the Air Defense Forces of the Moscow Region. He served in various capacities in the Moscow Military District, before being appointed its Commanding General in 1953.

On 26 June 1953, the CPSU Secretary Khrushchev along with Marshals Georgy Zhukov and Kirill Moskalenko secretly arrested First Deputy Prime Minister of the USSR Beria during a joint CPSU Presidium and Cabinet meeting. While Zhukov could not carry a gun into the Kremlin, Moskalenko sneaked into the Kremlin with a gun to arrest Beria. During the next six months, he and Rudenko investigated the "Beria Case". In December 1953 the Soviet Supreme Court found Beria guilty after a five-day proceeding. On December 23, Beria was shot. Another version states that Beria was shot by machine gun during the military assault on his residential compound in Moscow.

As a result of this operation, on 11 March 1955, Moskalenko, along with five other commanders, was given the rank of Marshal of the Soviet Union. Moskalenko remained in the Moscow Military District until 1960, when he was made Commander-in-Chief of the Strategic Rocket Forces. Moskalenko owed his very rapid promotion to having served with Khrushchev during the war. In his memoirs, Khrushchev said:

Moskalenko could be the best and the worst of men. During the war, I'd given a high recommendation of him to Stalin because Moskalenko was a devoted to the defence of our country, and he wasn't a bad soldier. On the bad side, he had a violent temper. He was more than just rude - he was mentally unbalanced. He was notorious for abusing his subordinates. His favourite phrases were "You traitor, scoundrel, enemy of the people! You ought to be court-martialled! You ought to be shot!" His uncontrollable temper made him a deeply moody man who could easily be used by others.

Khrushchev also claimed to have been shocked by the virulence with which Moskalenko denounced Marshal Zhukov in 1957, when Khrushchev had decided to sack Zhukov, but even so, he remained in office until April 1962, when he was dismissed without any reason being given, and was made an Inspector General of the Ministry of Defense, an honorary post of no significance. The French journalist Michel Tatu, who was based in Moscow at the time, surmised that his fall was related to the Cuban Missile Crisis:

The decision (to install soviet missiles on Cuba) affected him directly as commander in chief of strategic rockets. It is a safe bet that a man anxious to preserve his equipment intact could not have been happy at the prospect of having his most secret weapons shipped with nuclear warheads to a highly exposed site such as Cuba.

For his services in the development and strengthening of the Armed Forces of the USSR, he was awarded the title Hero of the Soviet Union for the second time in 1978. From December 1983, he was part of the Group of Inspectors General of the USSR Ministry of Defense.

Moskalenko died on 17 June 1985 in Moscow, at the age of 83. He is buried in Novodevichy Cemetery.

== Honours and awards ==
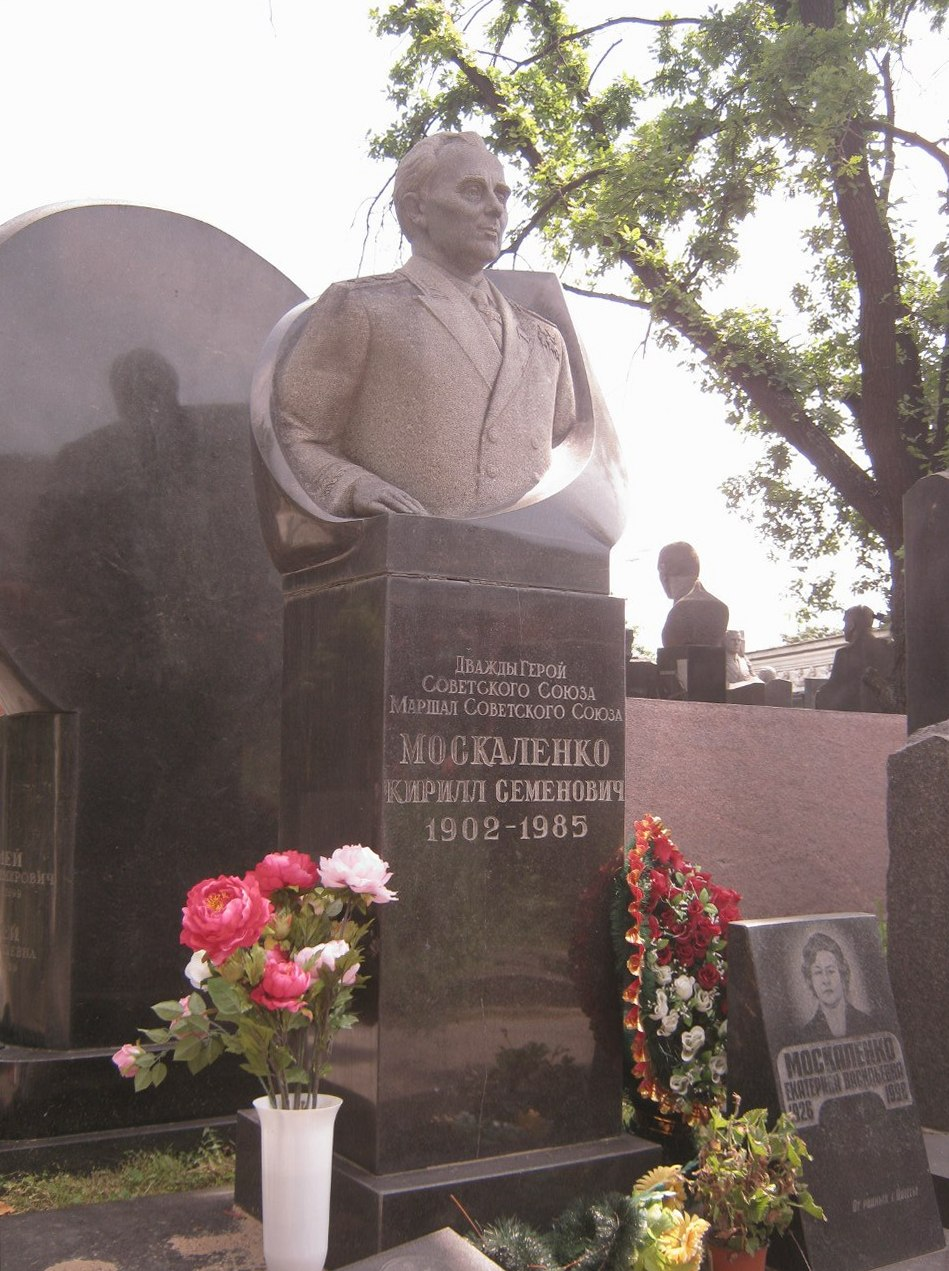
Moskalenko's grave at Novodevichy Cemetery

Soviet Union

Hero of the Soviet Union, twice ("Gold Star» No. 2002, 23 October 1943 and "Gold Star» No. 105, 21 February 1978)
Order of Lenin, seven times (22 July 1941, 23 October 1943, 6 November 1945, 7 March 1962, 10 May 1972, 21 February 1978, 10 May 1982)
Order of the October Revolution (22 February 1968)
Order of the Red Banner, five times (7 April 1940, 27 August 1943, 3 November 1944, 15 November 1950, 28 January 1954)
Order of Suvorov, 1st class, twice (28 January 1943, 23 May 1943)
Order of Kutuzov, 1st class, twice (29 May 1944, 25 August 1944)
Order of Bogdan Khmelnitsky, 1st class (10 January 1944)
Order of the Patriotic War, 1st class (6 April 1985)
Order for Service to the Homeland in the Armed Forces of the USSR, 3rd class (30 April 1975)
Medal "For the Defence of Stalingrad" (1942)
Medal "For the Liberation of Prague" (1945)
Medal "For the Defence of Kiev" (1961)
Medal "For the Victory over Germany in the Great Patriotic War 1941–1945" (1945)
Jubilee Medal "Twenty Years of Victory in the Great Patriotic War 1941-1945" (1965)
Jubilee Medal "Thirty Years of Victory in the Great Patriotic War 1941–1945" (1975)
Jubilee Medal "Forty Years of Victory in the Great Patriotic War 1941–1945" (1985)
Jubilee Medal "In Commemoration of the 100th Anniversary of the Birth of Vladimir Ilyich Lenin" (1969)
Medal "Veteran of the Armed Forces of the USSR" (1976)
Medal "For Strengthening of Brotherhood in Arms" (1979)
Jubilee Medal "XX Years of the Workers' and Peasants' Red Army" (1938)
Jubilee Medal "30 Years of the Soviet Army and Navy" (1948)
Jubilee Medal "40 Years of the Armed Forces of the USSR" (1958)
Jubilee Medal "50 Years of the Armed Forces of the USSR" (1968)
Jubilee Medal "60 Years of the Armed Forces of the USSR" (1978)
Medal "In Commemoration of the 1500th Anniversary of Kiev" (1982)

Foreign

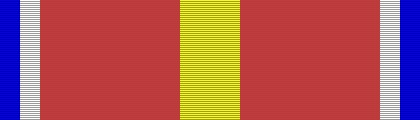
Hero of the Czechoslovak Socialist Republic (Czechoslovakia) (1969)
Order of Klement Gottwald (Czechoslovakia)
Order of the White Lion, 1st class (Czechoslovakia)
Military Order of the White Lion "For Victory", 1st class (Czechoslovakia)
War Cross 1939–1945 (Czechoslovakia)
Order of Friendship (Czechoslovakia)
Military Commemorative Medal (Czechoslovakia)
Medal “For Strengthening Friendship in Arms”, Golden class (Czechoslovakia)
Gold Star of the Czechoslovak Military Order for Liberty (Czechoslovakia)
Medal "In Commemoration of the Battle of Dukla Pass" (Czechoslovakia)
Order of Sukhbaatar (Mongolia)
Medal "50 Years of the Mongolian People's Army" (Mongolia)
Medal "60 Years of the Mongolian People's Army" (Mongolia)
Knight's Cross of the Order of Polonia Restituta (Poland)
Cross of Grunwald, 2nd class (Poland)
Brotherhood of Arms Medal (Poland)
Medal of Victory and Freedom 1945 (Poland)
Medal "For Oder, Neisse and the Baltic" (Poland)
Order of Tudor Vladimirescu, 1st class (Romania)
Honorary Knight Grand Cross of the Order of the British Empire (United Kingdom)

=== Other honors ===
- The Poltava Military School of Communications was named in honor of him.
- Honorary Citizen of the city of Tiraspol
- Streets named after him in Pokrovsk, Horlivka and Vinnytsia
- A bronze bust honoring him in Pokrovsk

=== Former honors ===
The Kyiv City Council stripped the title of "Honorary Citizen of the City of Kyiv" from Moskalenko on 26 May 2023. It stated it did so in accordance with Ukrainian decommunization laws.

== Bibliography ==
- Marshal K.S. Moskalenko (Commander of the 38th Army), On South-Western direction, Moscow, Science, 1969
- Marshal K.S. Moskalenko (Commander of the 38th Army), On South-Western direction, 1943 -1945, Moscow, Science, 1972
