= Teterev =

Teterev (Russian: Тетерев) is a Russian masculine surname, its feminine counterpart is Tetereva. It may refer to

- Boris Teterev (1953–2019), Latvian philanthropist
- Ināra Tetereva (born 1953), Latvian patron of the arts and charity, wife of Boris
- Vitaly Teterev (born 1983), Belarusian chess grandmaster

== See also ==
- Teteriv River
