= Teodors Eniņš =

Teodors Eniņš (December 6, 1934 in Liepāja – September 24, 2008 in Liepāja) — was a Latvian doctor, neurosurgeon, former mayor of Liepāja and former Minister of Welfare of Latvia. He was awarded the Order of the Three Stars (III class) in 2001.

Eniņš was born in Liepāja on 6 December 1934. His father was a building technician, the mother was a housewife, he also had a brother Andris (composer) and a sister Ruta. His grandmother Margrieta saved two Jewish men during the German occupation in World War II, for which T. Eniņš received the Righteous Among the Nations award from Yad Vashem. From 1950 to 1954 he studied at the 1st Liepāja school and simultaneously at the Liepāja Music School in the class of wind instruments. Later, from 1954 to 1960 he studied at Riga Medical Institute, receiving the doctor's diploma. His name is written in the history of Latvian medicine as the inventor of the magnetic impulse therapy. He worked in medicine for more than 30 years. He was the Head of the Traumatology-Orthopedics department at the Liepāja Central Hospital where he worked as a surgeon and neurosurgeon.

== Political career ==
In 1988, Eniņš was one of the organizers of the Liepāja branch of the Popular Front of Latvia, he was the co-chief and later (1990–1991) the chief of the organization. In March 1990, he was elected a deputy of the Supreme Council of the Republic of Latvia. He was the deputy chief of the Social Security and Health protection commission. On 19 November 1991 he was appointed as the Minister of Welfare of the Republic of Latvia. His term ended in August 1993. Later he returned to Liepāja and worked as a doctor in Liepāja Central Hospital. In 1994 Eniņš was elected as a Mayor of Liepāja City Council. He held this post until 1997.

During the last years of his life he spent a lot of his time in the family country estate "Ramati" in Sieksāte, Kuldiga district. Teodors Eniņš had a wife Aina (née Lamberts) and two children - Dace (GP, internist) and Dzintars (interior designer, died in 1986). He has 4 granddaughters.
