= Boriss Teterevs =

Latvian philanthropist (1953–2019)

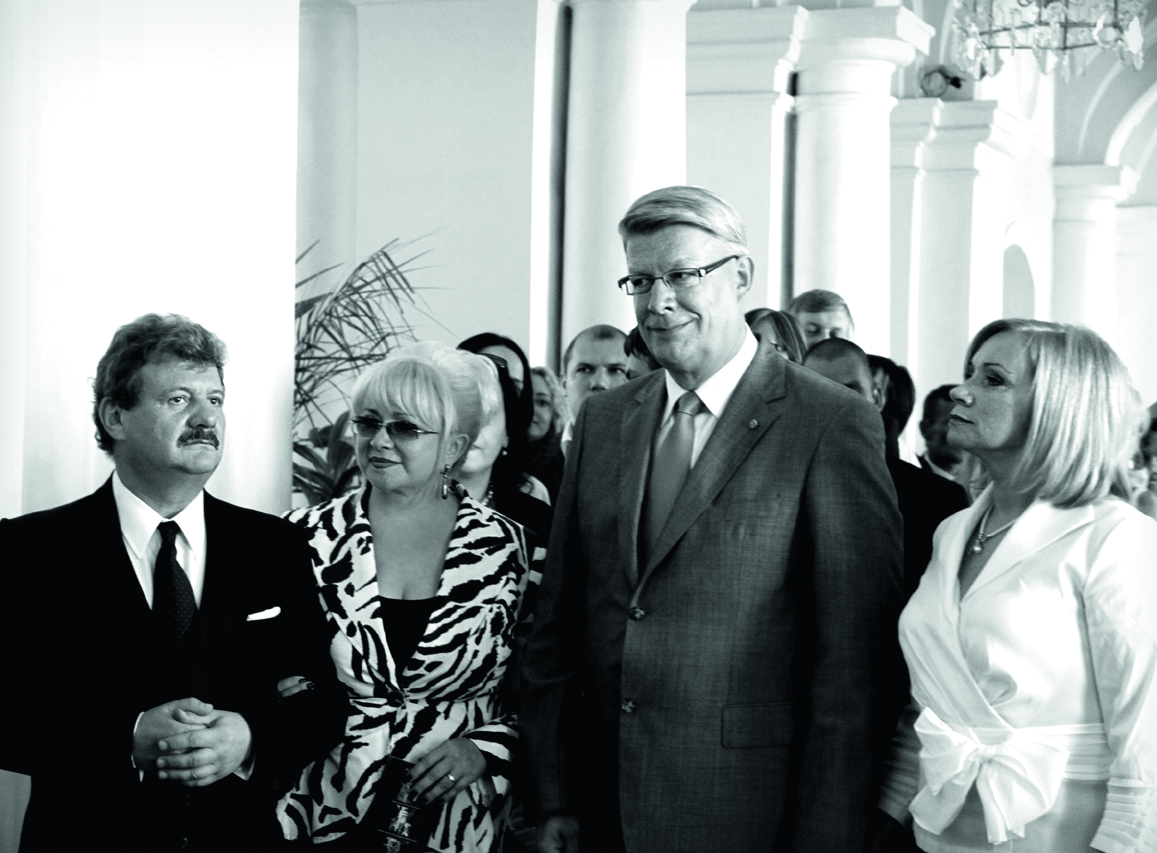
- Boriss Teterevs at Rundāle Palace
- Born: November 5, 1953; Riga, Latvia
- Died: September 21, 2019 (aged 65); Riga, Latvia
- Citizenship: Since 2002 - Latvia
- Occupations: founder of the Boriss and Ināra Teterevs Foundation
- Spouse: Ināra Tetereva
- Awards: Order of the Three Stars
- Website: www.teterevufonds.lv

Boriss Teterevs or Boris Teterev (Russian: Бори́с Изи́дорович Те́терев; November 5, 1953 – September 21, 2019) was a Latvian philanthropist and private patron in Latvia.

== Biography ==
Born November 5, 1953 in Riga. From 1961 to 1971 he studied at Riga Gymnasium No. 10 then at the Riga Medical Institute (today – Riga Stradiņš University), Faculty of Medicine (1974–1980). In 1975, he accomplished his idea: Lotus-doctor summer camps for students who wanted to study at the Medical Institute. From 1980 to 1989 he worked as a gynecologist-obstetrician at Riga City Hospital No. 4 and No. 5. He entered into business at the end of the 1980s.

From 1993 he led subsidiary of the Latvian company Mūsa Motors in Russia. In 1995, he became the owner and president of Mūsa Motors Moscow, which was the official Russian dealer for Volvo, Jaguar, Land Rover, Renault, Mercedes, Chrysler, Jeep, Dodge, BMW, Mini and Rolls-Royce.

In 2002, was admitted to Latvian citizenship through naturalization.

In 2008, he sold his business to focus on public activities. Since 2009 Boris Teterev was involved in film production. Several movies were produced due to his participation such as Machete Kills, Standing Up, Зимы не будет, Sin City: A Dame to Kill For, etc.

Teterevs died on 21 September 2019, aged 65.

== Awards ==
- In 2010, Boris Teterev was awarded the Certificate of Recognition by the Cabinet of Ministers for his significant contribution to upholding the cultural heritage of Latvia.
- In 2011, Boris and Inara Teterev were awarded Order of the Three Stars.
- In 2011, the patrons Boris and Ināra Teterev were awarded the Cicero Prize.
- In 2011, the State Inspection for Heritage Protection, the Latvian National Commission for UNESCO and the association ICOMOS Latvia awarded Boris and Ināra Teterev the Culture Heritage Special Prize of the Year for patronage.
- In 2011, the Ministry of Education and Science, as part of the European Voluntary Service Year 2011, they were awarded the Order of Merit for qualitative work in the public interest and significant contribution to the development of voluntary service in Latvia.
- In 2012, they were awarded the distinction “Riga Citizen 2012” for enlivening and promoting the tradition of charitable and cultural patronage in Riga.
- In 2012, the Latvian department of the Dante Alighieri Society (Societa Dante Alighieri in Lettonia) awarded the patrons Boris and Ināra Teterev the Grand Prize of the Year for their contribution to the preservation of Italian cultural heritage in Latvia.
- In 2012, Riga Stradiņš University (RSU) awarded Boris and Ināra Teterev Honorary Doctorate Degrees (Doctor honoris causa).

== Philanthropy ==
Since 1997, the Teterev family has been actively and wholeheartedly supporting the reconstruction of Rundāle Palace.

In 2010, Boris and his spouse Ināra Teterev established a family charity foundation to support outstanding charity initiatives that provide public benefits both in Latvia and internationally.

The foundation supports culture initiatives – the completion of the restoration of Rundāle Palace, the Riga Russian Theatre, the Latvian Academy of Music and others. In 2012, as patrons Boris and Ināra Teterev donated the artwork Gondola by Russian artist Dmitri Gutov to the Art Museum Riga Bourse.

Within the framework of their higher education excellence programme, the Boris and Ināra Teterev Foundation actively cooperates with the Riga Stradiņš University, which has established the patron Boris Teterev’s scholarship to medical students, awards grants for research and the Academy of Intelligence, and has created the framework for the RSU development strategy 2012 – 2020.

In 2012, in cooperation with the Art Academy of Latvia, they created the strategic action plan for higher education, and founded the grant of patroness Ināra Teterev for students of the Art Academy of Latvia.

In 2011, the Foundation supported the newly founded Prize of the Year of the Art Academy of Latvia (first laureates – artist Džemma Skulme, art historian Laima Slava and artist Jānis Avotiņš).

In 2012, the Academy of the Latvian National Opera (LNO) was established, thanks to the foundation.

The Foundation’s animal welfare support is significant: it sponsors the animal shelters Dzīvnieku draugs (since 2010) and Labās mājas (since 2013). The Latvian TV channel LTV1 has been airing Ķepa uz sirds (Paw on the Heart) since 2011, a family infotainment programme about animal welfare issues, expert advice, and animal grooming and breeding.

Teterevi has supported the arrangement of the infrastructure of the territory of the Botanical Garden of the University of Latvia following modern requirements, donating more than 1.4 million euros.
