= Ināra Tetereva =

Latvian philanthropist

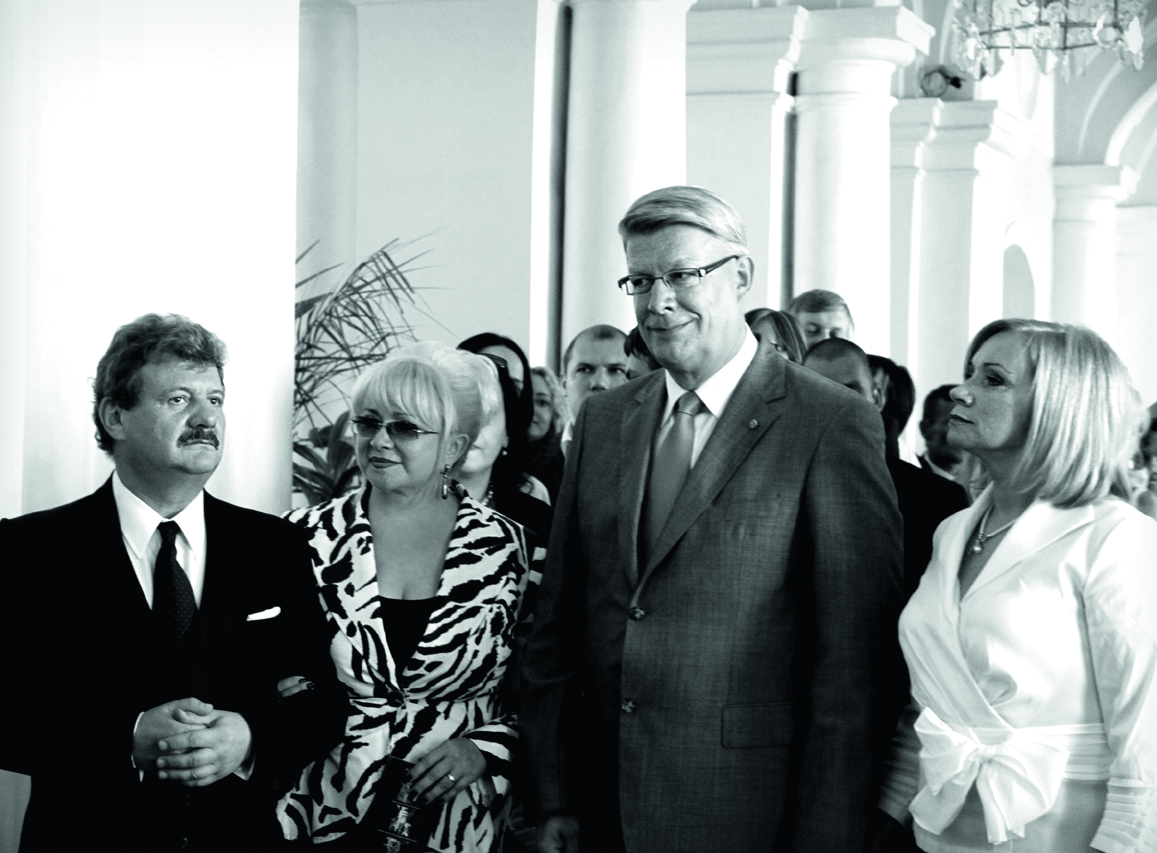
- President Valdis Zatlers awarded Ināra Tetereva with the Order of the Three Stars 2011
- Born: 6 February 1953 (age 72); Riga, Latvia
- Occupation(s): founder of Boris and Ināra Teterev Foundation
- Spouse: Boriss Teterevs
- Website: www.teterevufonds.lv

Ināra Tetereva (born February 6, 1953) is a Latvian philanthropist and patron of charities in Latvia.

== Education ==
Tetereva attended Teika Secondary School in Riga from 1960 to 1971. She also attended courses at the Art Academy of Latvia from 1971 to 1974.

== Awards ==
- In 2010, Ināra Tetereva received the annual Business Women’s Association award as the Most Generous Patron.
- In 2011, Boriss Teterevs and Ināra Tetereva were awarded Order of the Three Stars.
- In 2011, the patrons Boris and Ināra Teterev were awarded the Cicero Prize.
- In 2011, the State Inspection for Heritage Protection, the Latvian National Commission for UNESCO and the association ICOMOS Latvia Association awarded Ināra Tetereva the Special Prize for Patronage of the Annual Cultural Heritage Awards.
- In 2012, Boris Teterev and Ināra Tetereva were awarded the title Riga Citizen of the Year 2012 for the promotion of the tradition of charitable and cultural patronage in Riga.
- In 2012, Dante Alighieri Society (Societa Dante Alighieri in Lettonia) awarded the patrons Boriss Teterevs and Ināra Tetereva the Annual Grand Prize for contributing to the preservation of Italian cultural heritage in Latvia.
- In 2012, Riga Stradiņš University conferred honorary doctorates on Boriss Teterevs and Ināra Tetereva (Doctor honoris causa).
- Teterevu Foundation - Ināra and Boriss Teterevi are platinum patrons of the University of Latvia Foundation. Teterevi has supported the arrangement of the infrastructure of the territory of the Botanical Garden of the University of Latvia in accordance with modern requirements, donating more than 1.4 million euros.

== Philanthropy ==
Since 1997, the Teterev family has been actively and wholeheartedly supporting the reconstruction of Rundāle Palace.

In 2010, Boriss and his spouse Ināra Tetereva established a family charity foundation to support outstanding charity initiatives that provide public benefits both in Latvia and internationally.

The foundation supports culture initiatives – the completion of the restoration of Rundāle Palace, the Riga Russian Theatre and the Latvian Academy of Music. In 2012, as patrons Boris and Inara Teterev donated the artistic work Gondola by the artist Dmitry Gutov to the Art Museum Riga Bourse.

Within the framework of the higher education excellence programme, the Boris and Ināra Teterev Foundation actively cooperates with the Riga Stradiņš University, which has established the patron Boriss Teterevs’s scholarship to medical students, awards grants for research and the Academy of Intelligence, and has created the framework for the RSU development strategy 2012 – 2020.

In 2012, in cooperation with the Art Academy of Latvia, they created the strategic action plan for higher education, and founded the grant of patroness Ināra Tetereva for students of the Art Academy of Latvia. In 2011, the Foundation supported the newly founded Prize of the Year of the Art Academy of Latvia (first laureates – artist Džemma Skulme, art historian Laima Slava, artist Jānis Avotiņš ). In 2012, the Ināra Tetereva art scholarship was established, with the first awards going to Lilita Bauģe, Sandra Strēle and Agita Šteinberga. In 2012, the Academy of the Latvian National Opera (LNO) was established thanks to the Foundation.

The Foundation’s animal welfare support is significant: it sponsors the animal shelters Dzīvnieku draugs (since 2010) and Labās mājas (since 2013).

The Latvian TV channel LTV1 has been airing Ķepa uz sirds (Paw on the Heart) since 2011, a family infotainment programme about animal welfare issues, expert advice, and animal grooming and breeding.
