= Pauls Stradiņš Clinical University Hospital =

Hospital in Riga, Latvia

Coordinates: 56.932870°N 24.068298°E

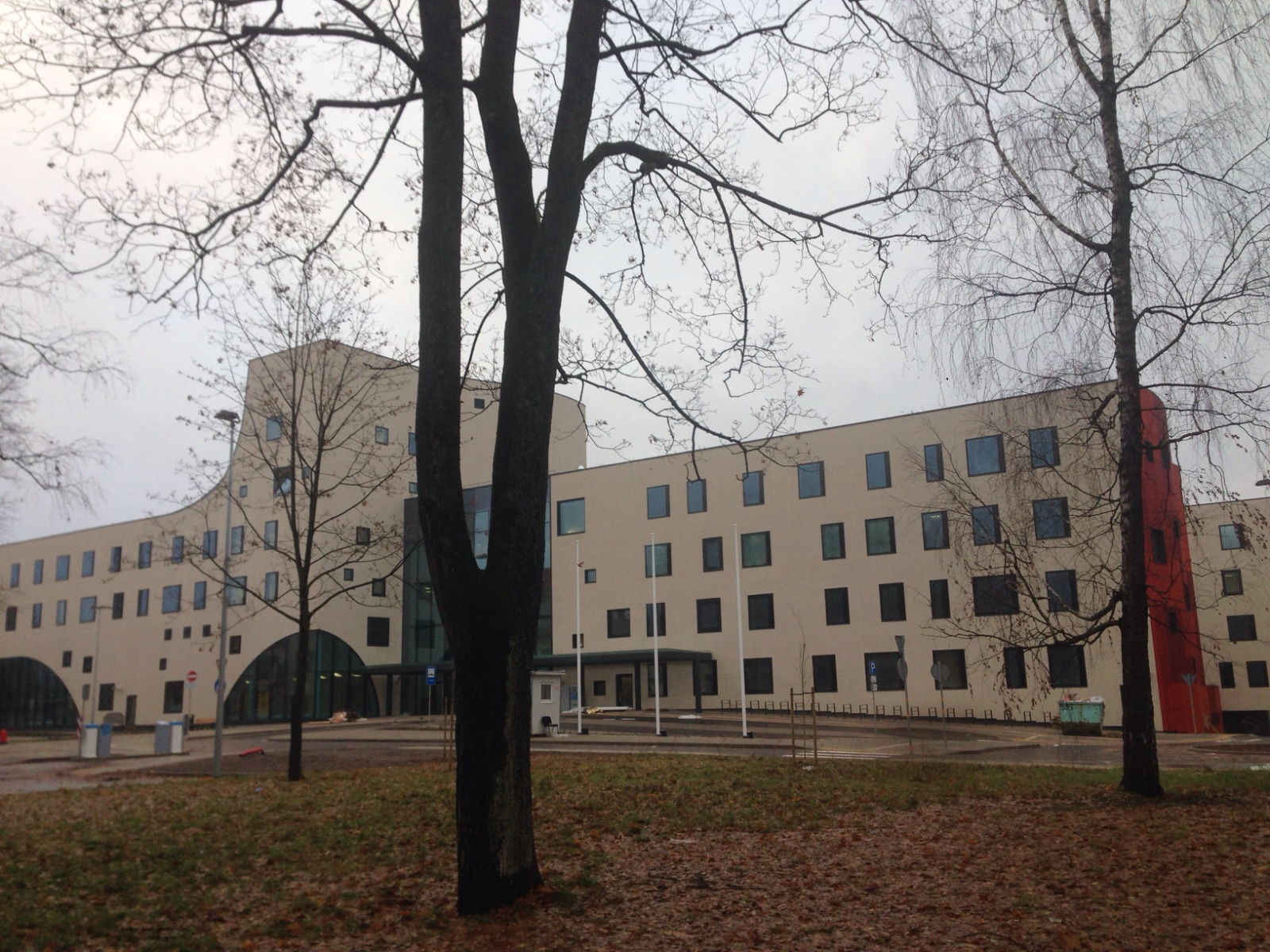
- View of one of the new hospital's buildings

Geography
- Location: Pilsoņu iela 13, Riga, Latvia

Organisation
- Type: teaching hospital
- Affiliated university: Faculty of Medicine, University of Latvia; Riga Stradiņš University

Services
- Emergency department: Yes
- Beds: 840

Helipads
- Helipad: No

History
- Founded: 1910

Links
- Website: stradini.lv

Pauls Stradiņš Clinical University Hospital (Latvian: Paula Stradiņa Klīniskā universitātes slimnīca) is an outpatient and hospital health care service provider in Riga, Latvia. This hospital also plays a role in medical science and medical education. It aims to become a science and a training center to residents and prospective doctors and currently is affiliated with two universities (University of Latvia and Riga Stradiņš University). It is named after Pauls Stradiņš.

== History ==
Latvia's largest and most important hospital has changed its name eight times since 1910. It was called 2nd Riga City Hospital from 1910 until 1940, and has been the main teaching hospital of the University of Latvia since 1928. During the Soviet occupation in 1940–1941, it was called the National Clinical Hospital, and then during the German occupation until 1944 it was called Riga Hospital. From 1944 until 1948, it was called the National Clinical Hospital, then renamed the Republican Clinical Hospital until 1958 when the name was again changed to Pauls Stradiņš Republican Clinical Hospital. In 1993, the name was again changed to Pauls Stradiņš National Hospital, and in 1995 the name was changed to the Latvian Academy of Medicine Pauls Stradiņš Clinical Hospital. Finally it got its present name – Pauls Stradiņš Clinical University Hospital. However, since 1958 residents of Riga in daily life refer to the hospital by one simple word – Stradiņa.

=== Incidents ===
On 2 August 2013, at around 09:21 several oxygen gas cylinders exploded in the basement of the cardiology wing's 32nd block, injuring two people. The explosions started a fire, which caused at least 10 more gas cylinders to explode. After the initial explosions an evacuation of the cardiology wing began, which resulted in the evacuation of 170 people.

On 31 July 2019, a phone call was received by Pauls Stradins Clinical University Hospital regarding a planted bomb which caused the hospital’s administration to evacuate all patients and halt operations that day.

=== Expansion ===
The hospital opened the first section of a new wing in 2017. Block A stage one was constructed at a cost of €74,890,870, with €24,076,323 provided by the European Regional Development Fund.

Initially, the second stage of construction was planned to be completed by 2023. However deadlines were extended till the end of 2026. The total cost of the project was estimated at EUR 156 million.
