= Pēteris Pauls Jozuus =

Latvian conductor (1873–1937)

- Born: September 30, 1873; Kaplava Parish, Courland Governorate, Russian Empire
- Died: December 3, 1937 (aged 64); Riga, Latvia
- Occupation(s): Organist, conductor

Pēteris Pauls Jozuus (30 September 1873, in Kaplava Parish – 3 December 1937, in Riga) was a Latvian conductor, organist, and music teacher. From 1906, he was the organist at the St. Gertrude New Church, Riga, was a co-founder of the Jāzeps Vītols Latvian Academy of Music in 1919, and then served as the choirmaster at the Latvian National Opera from 1919 to 1935, briefly serving as its director from 1927 to 1929. He also served as chief conductor for several Latvian Song and Dance Festival. He was invested with the Order of the Three Stars in 1926.
