= Pauls Stradiņš Jr =

Latvian physicist

- Born: 1963 (age 62–63)
- Known for: Pioneering work on silicon, photovoltaics, and renewable energy
- Awards: foreign member of the Latvian Academy of Sciences; U.S. patents 8,239,165; 7,601,215; 8,389,422; 8,466,447; 8,569,708

Pauls Stradiņš Jr. (born 1963) is a physicist at the National Renewable Energy Laboratory in Golden, Colorado, and a foreign member of the Latvian Academy of Sciences.

Currently he is the principal scientist and a project leader of the silicon photovoltaics group at NREL. He leads a team that recently theorized that defects in photovoltaic cells could actually improve the performance of those cells.

He is the grandson of Pauls Stradiņš (17 January 1896 – 14 August 1958), a Latvian professor and physician.
