= Pauls Stradiņš =

Latvian physician

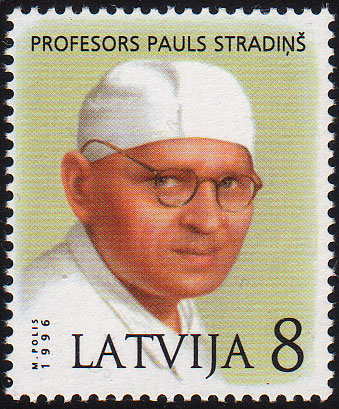
- Latvian postage stamp (1996)
- Born: 17 January 1896; Viesīte (now Jēkabpils Municipality), Courland Governorate (now Latvia)
- Died: 14 August 1958 (aged 62); Riga, Latvia
- Education: Imperial Medical and Surgical Academy of Petrograd
- Known for: Pioneering work on peripheral nerve injury, blood transfusion, and cancer treatment
- Spouse(s): Ņina Stradiņa (née Malysheva, 1897–1991)

Pauls Stradiņš (17 January 1896 – 14 August 1958) was a Latvian professor, physician, and surgeon who founded the Museum of the History of Medicine in Riga.

== Early life ==
Stradiņš was born in Eķengrāve (German: Eckengraf) (now Viesīte, Jēkabpils Municipality) as the son of a craftsman and pub owner. He graduated from the Riga Alexander Gymnasium in 1914 and entered the S. M. Kirov Military Medical Academy in Petrograd (now Saint Petersburg), where his professors included the Nobel Prize-winning physiologist Ivan Pavlov.

== Medical education ==
During World War I, Stradiņš was an army doctor on the Russian Western Front and in Persia, and then the chief of a surgical department in Vladivostok. After graduating from the military medical academy in 1919, he became an institute doctor (i.e., a candidate for an M.D. degree) in the academy's hospital surgery clinic, headed by Professor Sergey Fedorov, the former private surgeon of Tsar Nicholas II. Under Fedorov's supervision, Stradiņš completed a doctoral thesis on the treatment of peripheral nerve injury. It included data from 862 patients on trophic, secretory and vasomotor disturbances after injuries to the extremities, and on surgical and nonsurgical treatment methods.

In 1919, Stradiņš, working with N. N. Yelanski, I. R. Petrov, and other colleagues, produced the first standard serum for blood transfusion in Soviet Russia. Three years later, he ran an experiment on himself: A periarterial sympathectomy (pioneered by Mathieu Jaboulay) was performed on his left shoulder by V. N. Shamov, and Stradiņš personally evaluated the results. He also carried out physiological and pharmacological experiments in the laboratories of the physiologist Ivan Pavlov and pharmacologist Nikolai Kravkov.

Fedorov regarded Stradiņš as one of his "best and most gifted pupils, and his works on the spontaneous gangrene and operations on nerves as indubitably excellent".

== Career ==
=== Pre-World War II ===
Stradiņš returned to Riga at the end of 1923 and joined the faculty of medicine at the newly founded University of Latvia. In 1924, he became the first Rockefeller Fellow from Latvia. During his fellowship, he worked under Alfred Washington Adson at the Mayo Clinic in Rochester, Minnesota, as well as under C. C. Choyce at Imperial College London. In 1927, he defended his second doctoral thesis at the University of Latvia, summarizing the results of his research in Petrograd, Rochester, and Riga on the genesis and treatment of obliterating endarteritis. The main results were published in German and Russian medical journals and were recognized by the Latvian Cultural Foundation in 1928.

At the end of the 1920s, Stradiņš turned his attention from peripheral neurosurgery to abdominal surgery and cancer treatment. In 1931, he was appointed medical director of the 2nd City Hospital of Riga (now Pauls Stradiņš Clinical University Hospital), which he helped to modernize. In 1933, he became a professor of surgery, a position he held until his death in 1958.

From 1927–39, he interacted with research centers all over Europe and adopted foreign innovations in Latvia. He became the country's leading oncology specialist, and in 1935, he founded the first surgical department for cancer treatment at his hospital. In 1938, he founded a specialized cancer hospital in Riga. He paid primary attention to the treatment of inoperable cancer patients, contacted experts from Germany and Austria, and presented his preliminary results on the topic at the 1st Conference of Medical Doctors of the Baltic Countries and Finland, held in 1938 in Helsinki.

Stradiņš was one of the most recognized doctors in Latvia because of his successful private practice and his organizational activities in health care. In 1937, during the authoritarian regime of Kārlis Ulmanis, he founded and chaired the Society for Health Promotion (Latvian: Veselības veicināšanas biedrība). The society—which included anti-cancer, anti-tuberculosis, and venereology sections—maintained sanatoriums and organized exhibitions on health care and demography. It also included the Institute of Research of the Nation’s Life Resources (Latvian: Tautas dzīvā spēka pētīšanas institūts), headed by Jacob Prīmanis, which was responsible for demographic, genealogical, and eugenics research on the population of Latvia.

Stradiņš was a co-founding member and representative of Latvia at the International Academy for Improvement of Medical Education, founded in Budapest in 1938, and served as the Latvian delegate to several international health organizations.

All these activities ceased when the Soviet Union annexed Latvia in 1940. During the first year of the Soviet occupation, Stradiņš retained his hospital duties and renewed contacts with his former colleagues in Soviet Russia. But with the entrance of Nazi forces in 1941, he was arrested because of his humanitarian aid to Jews and wounded soldiers at his hospital. After his release, he was dismissed from his job, and later also from the cancer hospital, where he had tried to save mentally disabled patients.

=== Post–World War II ===
In contrast to the majority of Latvian medical professors and doctors, Stradiņš did not escape to the West during World War II. He was one of the few non-Communist Latvian intellectuals who stayed for patriotic reasons and tried to take positive action under the new conditions, and he thus became a key figure not only in medicine, but also in public activities.

Stradiņš served as dean of his hospital's faculty of medicine from 1944 to 1946, as the chief doctor of the clinical hospital from 1944 to 1947, as chairman of the Medicine Science Council at the Health Ministry from 1945 to 1948, and as the chief surgeon and chief oncologist of the Latvian Soviet Socialist Republic. He was elected to the USSR Academy of Medical Sciences in 1945 and nominated as one of the first full members of the newly founded Latvian Academy of Sciences in 1946.

Nevertheless, under the ideological repression of the immediate postwar period—driven by Stalinism and the Soviet Union's struggle against Western influences—Stradiņš soon lost his positions in medicine and science. He was dismissed from his main duties and became a victim of ideological campaigns from 1947 to 1949. However, he was allowed to continue working as a professor, and until 1950 he held the position of director of the Institute of Experimental Medicine at the Latvian Academy of Sciences. During the 1940s and 1950s, he conducted research on cancer and was the first to use the nitrofuran agent Furacilin and thiotepa as chemotherapy in the Soviet Union. He also helped educate a generation of Latvian physicians and surgeons, and he founded a museum on the history of medicine.

The museum grew out of Stradiņš' private collection, which he began in prewar Latvia. In the 1930s, the collection was on the premises of his clinical hospital. He completed it and donated it to the state in 1957. It was the largest collection on the history of world medicine in the Soviet Union, and in 1958 it was named after Stradiņš.

In the last years of his life, after Joseph Stalin's death, Stradiņš was "rehabilitated" from various charges. From 1955 to 1958, he served as a deputy on the Supreme Soviet of the Latvian SSR, the legislature of Soviet Latvia. In his last months, he organized the first cardiothoracic operations and arranged for official recognition of his museum. He died on 14 August 1958, a year and a half after having a stroke.

== Legacy ==
Stradiņš' name is borne by his museum— Pauls Stradiņš Museum for the History of Medicine —as well as by several other institutions, including the Pauls Stradiņš Clinical University Hospital (since 1958) and the P. Stradiņš Health and Social Care College in Jūrmala (since 1989). In 1998, the Riga Medical Institute was reorganized and renamed Riga Stradiņš University. The name was affirmed by Latvia's Parliament, the Saeima, in 2002.

Stradiņš was a many-sided physician, active in surgery, oncology, physiotherapy, pharmacology, blood transfusion, urology, and dieting, as well as health care administration. He introduced many modern diagnostic and treatment practices to Latvia and investigated new methods for the early detection of cancer. He was also a member of the editorial boards of three leading Soviet medical journals: Klinitcheskaya Medicina, Eksperimental'naya Chirurgija, and Voprosy onkologiji. He published about 80 scientific papers in Russian, German, Latvian, Polish, Finnish, Lithuanian, and English, and a three-volume, Russian-language edition of his selected works was issued posthumously from 1963–65.

He received the Latvian "Croix de la Reconnaissance" in 1938, and the Soviet Order of the Red Banner of Labor in 1956. He was a Merited Scientist of the Latvian SSR (1945) and an honorary member (1957) of the N. Pirogov Society, the oldest Russian association for surgeons.

The Pauls Stradiņš Award—established in 1983 to honor merits in the history of medicine, and in 1991 to honor merits in medical practice—is Latvia's most prestigious award in the medical sciences.

== Family and colleagues ==
Stradiņš' wife, Ņina Stradiņa (née Malysheva, 1897–1991), was one of the pioneers of physiotherapeutic treatment in Latvia. They had four children. Among his grandchildren is Pauls Stradiņš Jr. (b. 1963), a physicist at the National Renewable Energy Laboratory in Golden, Colorado.

== Notes ==
- Akadēmiķis Pauls Stradiņš. Bibliogrāfija. Rīga, 1959 (in Latvian, Russian)
- Professors Pauls Stradiņš dzīvē un darbā. Rīga, 1961 (in Latvian)
- A. Vīksna. Paula Stradiņa dzīves un darbības vietas. Rīga, 1973 (in Latvian), 1978 (Russian translation)
- J. Stradiņš, K. Ē. Ārons, A. Vīksna. Tāds bija mūsu laiks. Veltījums P. Stradiņa 100gadei. Rīga, 1996. 491 p. (in Latvian)
- J. Stradiņš, J. Salaks. (Edit.) Materials about Pauls Stradins and his museum. Acta Medico-Historica Rigensia. Vol. VIII. Rīga, 2007. 430 p. (in Latvian, Russian, English)
- Страдынь П. И. Избранные труды. Рига, т. 1-3, 1963—1965 (Selected works, in Russian)
- Павел Иванович Страдынь — врач, ученый, человек. Отв. ред. В. В. Канеп. Рига: Зинатне, 1967. 392 с. (in Russian)
