= Riga Stradiņš University =

Public university in Riga, Latvia

Riga Stradins University
- Rīgas Stradiņa universitāte
- Former names: Rīga Medical Institute (RMI) (1950-1990); Medical Academy of Latvia (1990-1998)
- Motto: Ars longa, vita brevis (Latin)
- Motto in English: "The art is long, life is short"
- Type: Public
- Established: September 1, 1950; 75 years ago
- Founders: Ernests Burtnieks, Ādolfs Krauss, Pauls Stradiņš
- Accreditation: Government of Latvia
- Affiliations: EUA, EAEC, MCU
- Chancellor: Toms Baumanis
- Rector: Aigars Petersons
- Students: 12474 (fall 2025)
- Doctoral students: >250 (fall 2025)
- Other students: 3146 International Students (fall 2025)
- Location: Riga, Latvia; 56°57′13″N 24°03′19″E
- Campus: Urban
- Language: Latvian, English
- Network: Skaļāk
- Colours: Red Orange
- Nickname: Stradiņi, RSU
- Website: www.rsu.lv/eng

University rankings

Global – Overall
- QS World: 1001–1200 (2025)

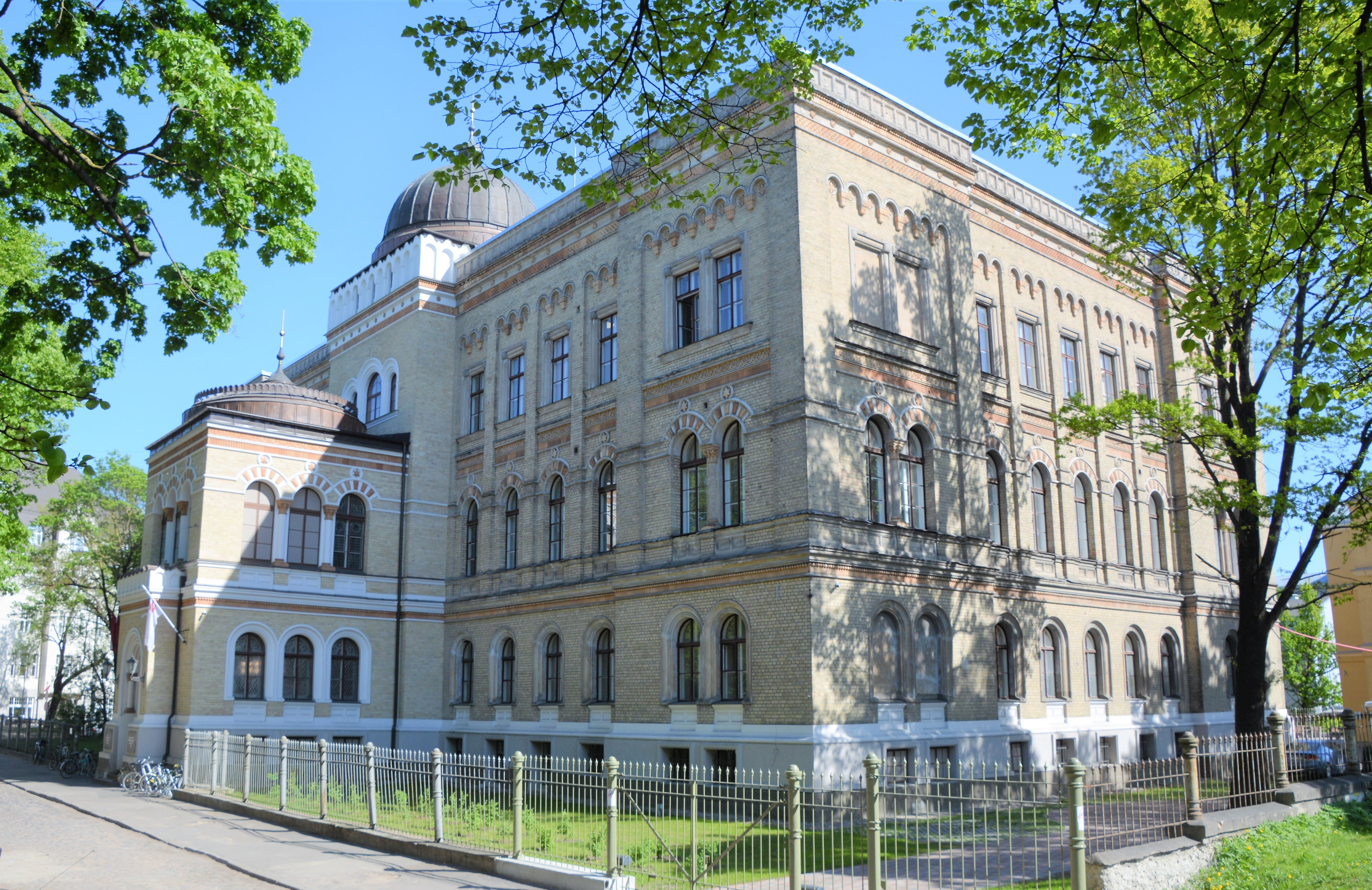
The Anatomicum on Kronvalda bulvāris (formerly Riga Orthodox Seminary building)

Riga Stradins University (RSU) (Latvian: Rīgas Stradiņa universitāte, Latin: Universitas Rigensis Stradina) is a public university located in the city of Riga, Latvia. The name Stradiņš (Latvian pronunciation: [ˈstradiɲʃ]) in the university's title refers to the Stradiņš family, who have had a significant influence on the course of community and academic life in Latvia for over a century.

== Riga Stradins University ==
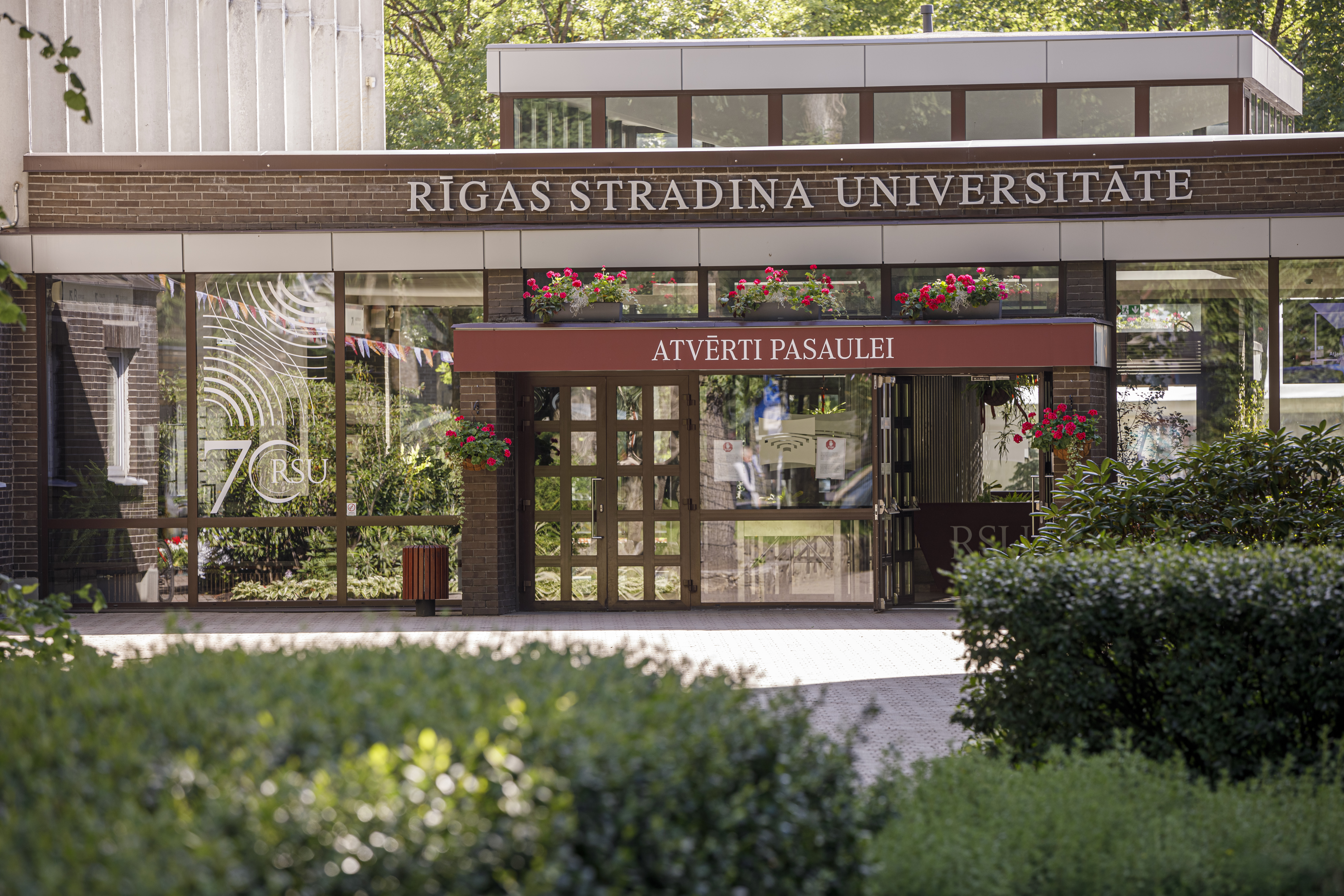
Main campus on Dzirciema iela

In 1950, Riga Medical Institute was established on the basis of the Faculty of Medicine of the State University of Latvia. The initiators were professors Pauls Stradiņš (1896–1958) and Ernests Burtnieks (1898–1958) – the first director of Riga Medical Institute, and Healthcare Minister of the Republic of Latvia Ādolfs Krauss. Initially the institute included the faculties of medicine, dentistry and pharmacy, as well as 45 departments.

Riga Stradins University is a state-funded university which offers various study programmes and ensures the realisation of scientific projects, providing training of experts in health care and social sciences who work in Latvia and across the world. It is the only university in Latvia which has traditionally been integrated into the country's healthcare system. This ensures a successful run of the university, a precondition for the effective existence of the health care system in Latvia.

RSU is autonomous and academically free to pursue its goals and tasks, working for the benefit of the state and society, and offering a wide array of academic and professional education and research opportunities in the fields of health care, social care, social sciences and natural sciences.

Riga Stradins University is ranked in the top 1001-1200 universities in the world, and top 651–700 in medicine by the QS world rankings. Its ranking is on a downward trend since 2023

== History ==
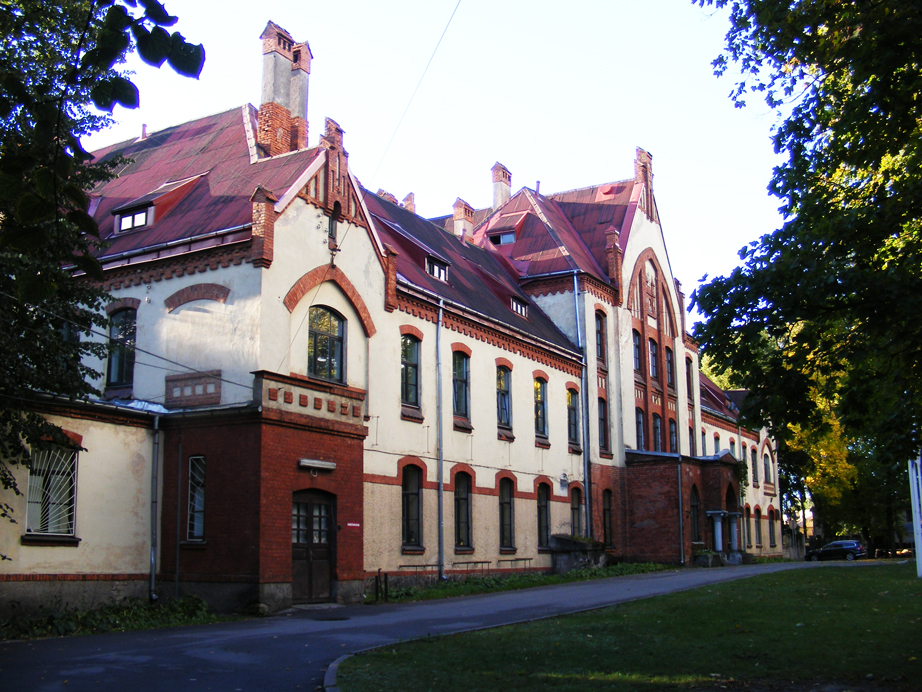
Old building of the Pauls Stradiņš Clinical University Hospital

On 2 February 1920, Swedish professor Gaston Bakman held the first lecture on human anatomy in the Theatrum Anatomicum Rigense (currently Anatomical Theatre in Riga). This lecture was the forebearer of higher education in medicine in Latvia. Professor Gaston Bakman believed that this was also the beginning of the Institute of Anatomy and Histology, as well as the Museum of Anatomy in Riga.

After World War II, only two professors of medicine remained in Latvia, one of whom was Professor Pauls Stradiņš, who in a very short time as the Dean of the Faculty of Medicine managed to rebuild and renew the education and science of medicine from scratch. In 1950, during the Soviet occupation, the Riga Medical Institute (Latvian: Rīgas Medicīnas institūts; Russian: Рижский медицинский институт, romanized: Rizhskiy meditsinskiy institut; Latin: Institutum Medical Riga) was established on the basis of the Faculty of Medicine of the State University of Latvia. Initially the institute included the faculties of medicine, dentistry and pharmacy, as well as 45 departments.

In 1990, the institute was renamed Medical Academy of Latvia (Latvian: Latvijas Medicīnas akadēmija, Latin: Academia Medicinaei Latviensis), but already on 5 April 1998, the Constitutional Assembly made the decision to rename Medical Academy of Latvia, based on its actual activities as Riga Stradiņš University. Riga Stradiņš University in time developed into a university type higher education institution, as it trains experts not only in the fields of medicine and pharmacy, but also offers study programmes in social sciences, natural sciences, public health and law. On 13 June 2002, Riga Stradiņš University Act came into effect and Medical Academy of Latvia was renamed Riga Stradiņš University.

== Structure ==
Riga Stradiņš University's nine faculties provide undergraduate and postgraduate level studies in various programmes. High school students, as well as Doctors of Science, have the opportunity to study at RSU, enhance their education, and make a contribution to the creation of knowledge and new technologies.

Currently there are 9 faculties at RSU:

=== Medical Sciences ===
- Faculty of Dentistry
- Faculty of Medicine
- Faculty of Pharmacy
- Faculty of Health and Sports Sciences

=== Social Sciences ===
- Faculty of Communications (including Department of Communication Studies and Department of Sociology)
- Faculty of European Studies (including Department of Political Science and Department of Economics)

=== Law ===
- Faculty of Law

=== Post-graduate departments ===
- Faculty of Continuing Education
- Division of Doctoral Studies

There is also a department for international students studying at RSU: the International Student Department

University students can choose full-time studies, which require undivided attention as well as part-time studies, which can usually be combined with work. Medicine and health care students at various levels of study can access state budget funded study places, whereas the best social science students receive discounts on their tuition fees.

=== Liepāja Branch ===
Riga Stradiņš University (RSU) Liepāja branch is the place where for over 70 years various health care professionals have been trained. Currently the RSU Liepāja branch offers first level professional higher education in health care, offering the following programmes: Medical massage, Nursing, Physicians' Assistant and Health Sport Specialist with approximately 200 students enrolled. Health care specialists may also choose the Bachelor's study programme Nursing and the Master's study programme Nursing.

Study programmes Nursing and Health Sport Specialist offered at RSU Liepāja branch are identical in terms of content to the study programmes that are offered at RSU in Riga. Following placement, most students start working in the same health care institutions where placement was completed.

== Students and teaching ==
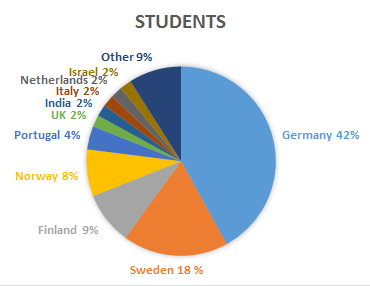
2017 foreign student enrollment by country

RSU has a student teacher ratio of 1:10. The total number of students for 2024 stands on 12007, while the total number of RSU employees stands at around 1,800, with 370 academic staff members. The language of instruction at RSU is primarily Latvian, however an increasing number of faculties and departments additionally offer programmes in English for international students studying medicine, dentistry, pharmacy, nursing, physiotherapy, public health, health management, international business and start-up entrepreneurship and international governance and diplomacy, etc. One third of all international students in Latvia study at RSU and currently international students constitute more than 27% of the student body of the university. In 2022 In 2022 out of 2620 international students 30% came from Germany, 26% from Sweden, 12,5% from Finland and 7% from Norway 4.5% from Italy, 2.4% form India, 2.2% from Portugal, and 2.2% from Israel. In the same year, 88% of foreign students studied in the Faculty of Medicine and 11% in the Faculty of Dentistry. Even though 87% of international students are from the EU/EEA countries, RSU students represent 70 different countries creating an active multicultural study and social environment at RSU. In the same year, 87.6% of international students studied in the Faculty of Medicine and 11.2% in the Faculty of Dentistry.[3] RSU has also developed partnerships with more than 150 Erasmus+ partner universities and welcomes international exchange students form different countries every semester.

=== Student life ===
• The Riga Stradins University Student Union (Studējošo pašpārvalde in Latvian, SP) is an organisation whose objective is to represent the interests of all university students in their academic and cultural lives. The Student Council has 36 members - all of them RSU students - representing students from all faculties of the university. Any student can become a member of the council by participating in the elections that are held each November.

• The Riga Stradins University (RSU) International Student Association’s (ISA) mission is to represent, serve and help improve the lives of all international students at RSU. ISA co-operates with the RSU Student Union, the International Department, and the deans of various faculties in order to help all our students with any queries or problems that they may have during their time at RSU.

• The Riga Stradins University (RSU) student media network Skaļāk (Louder) is like a laboratory where students (future photographers, multimedia specialists, journalists and public relations specialists) can practice and hone their skills by filming, recording podcasts, shooting photo series and interviewing unusual people. • Folk dance group "Ačkups" was founded in 1951, and already in 1975 it was awarded the status of a National Dance Group. Members of the "Ačkups" dance group include promising physicians, dentists and other RSU students, as well as graduates and students from other universities. The rehearsals are extremely spirited and lively within this student dance group, since all of them enjoy rehearsing and performing traditional Latvian folk dances.

• Mixed choir “Rīga” was established in 1951 and for almost 20 years (1967-1986) its conductor was the accomplished professor Jānis Dūmiņš. In 1968, the choir was awarded the status of National Choir. Over the years, the choir has been led by many talented conductors, e.g. Centis Kriķis, Kārlis Beinerts, Edvīns and Inga Dziļums, Ints Teterovskis, etc. The choir's conductors currently are Evita Taranda (since 2000) and Zane Zilberte (since 2006); Uģis Meņģelis is the choir master.

• The RSU Sports Club invites students and teachers to demonstrate their skills and abilities not just in their academic endeavours, but in sports as well. The RSU Sports Club offers students lessons in more than 10 sports and the opportunity to test their skills in annual tournaments. The RSU Sports Club offers basketball (for men and women), volleyball, hockey, aesthetic group gymnastics, table tennis, swimming, soccer, functional training, fitness pilates, gym, interval training on rowing and skiing ergometers, and others.

• B-Space is a business incubator created by Riga Stradins University (RSU). It has been designed to support and promote innovation, leadership and business opportunities. Here you will find common rooms with everything you might need for both work and leisure: free wi-fi, office equipment, a kitchen and leisure areas, etc. The incubator provides students with a great opportunity to experiment and create prototypes of their ideas, meet like-minded people to build a team, consult with experts and receive support from mentors, participate in networking events and other events organised by the incubator.

• The Latvian Medical Student Association (LaMSA) is a non-governmental organisation that has been granted the status of public benefit organisation for the promotion of health and education and disease prevention. It is managed and operated by Latvian students and prospective health care professionals (medical-, dental- and public health students as well as rehabilitation professionals and others).

== Awards ==
• In 2015, RSU was recognized as one of the most exportable brands in Latvia, winning The Red Jackets award. And the Investment and Development Agency of Latvia, in cooperation with the Ministry of Economy, within the framework of the "Export and Innovation Award" competition, awarded Riga Stradins University the Export Champion category.

• In 2016, the university received international recognition as a student-centered university according to the experts of PASCL (Peer Assessment of Student Centered Learning). PASCL is an EU-level project directed by the European Student Union, while the experts' visit to Riga was initiated by the RSU Student Self-Government. RSU is one of the few higher education institutions in Europe that was chosen for a PASCL expert visit.

• In 2018, Riga Stradins University was recognized as the university with the best reputation in Latvia for the second year in a row, obtaining the highest score among the nine largest universities in Latvia. This was concluded in the study of the reputation of Latvian universities conducted by the research company Kantar TNS.

== Rectors ==
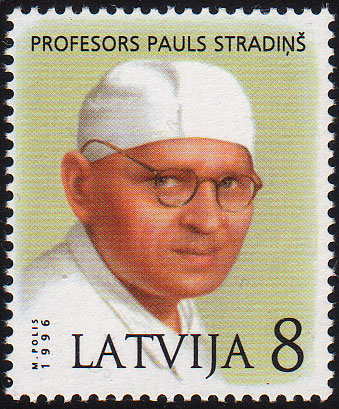
1996 Latvian postage stamp commemorating the 100th anniversary of Professor Pauls Stradiņš

- Ernests Burtnieks (1950–1958)
- Vasilijs Kalbergs (1958–1963)
- Vladislavs Korzāns (1963–1992)
- Jānis Vētra (1992–2007)
- Jānis Gardovskis (2008 - 2017)
- Aigars Pētersons (since 2017 until present)

== Notable alumni ==
RSU alumni include many prominent doctors and members in the society, including many former and present politicians, e.g.:

- Georgs Andrejevs, former minister for foreign affairs, 1992-1994
- Hosams Abu Meri, minister for health, since 2023
- Juris Bārzdiņš, former minister for health, 2010-2011
- Jānis Birks, former mayor of Riga, 2007-2009
- Ingrīda Circene, former minister for health, 2003-2004, 2011-2014
- Anda Čakša, former minister for health, 2016-2019, minister for education and science since 2022
- Gundars Daudze, former Speaker of the Saeima, 2007-2010
- Teodors Eniņš, pioneer of magnetic impulse therapy, activist and co-chairman of the Popular Front of Latvia, former minister of welfare
- Didzis Gavars, former minister for health, 2010
- Baiba Rozentāle, former minister for health, 2009-2010
- Jānis Straume, former Speaker of the Saeima, 1998-2002
- Inese Jaunzeme, Latvian javelin thrower who won a gold medal at the 1956 Olympics.
- Maira Sudrabiņa, Chancery of the President of the Republic of Latvia, Secretary of the Chapter of Orders
- Boris Teterev, philanthropist behind the Boris and Ināra Teterev Foundation
- Ilze Viņķele, former minister for welfare, 2011-2014, former minister for health, 2019-2021, McCain Institute scholar
- Valdis Zatlers, President of Latvia, 2007-2011
