= Latvians and Baltic Germans in Corner Brook, Newfoundland =

Shortly after Newfoundland's confederation with Canada in 1949, about 70 Baltic Germans and Latvians immigrated to the island as part of then Premier Joseph R. Smallwood’s industrialization and economic diversification strategy, the New Industries Program. Their expertise in cement and gypsum had contributed to Germany's reconstruction after the war, and it enabled them to participate in building Newfoundland's infrastructure after Confederation.

== Origins ==
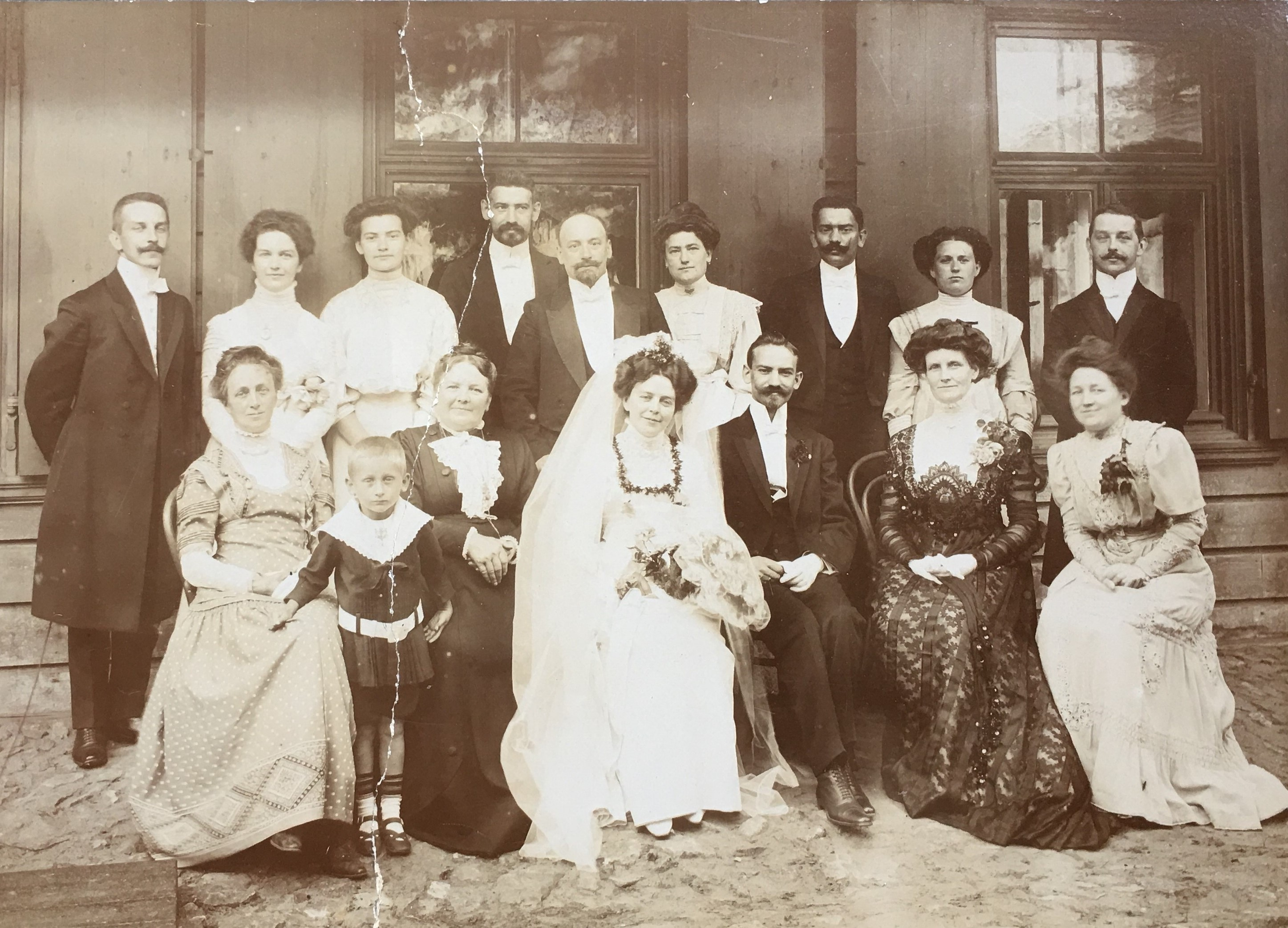
The extended Frey family in Latvia. Three of their children emigrated to Corner Brook: Edith Tietjens, Horst Frey, and Heimtrud Rodsewicz

The adults in these Latvian and the Baltic German families, born in Latvia between 1896 and 1920, came from families of landowners, the intelligentsia, or the merchant and professional classes. Their children were born in Latvia, Poland and Germany. During their lives, they experienced, endured – and made the best of – highly eventful times. Even though, in their young lives, they had already experienced the turmoil and uncertainty of the Russian Revolution, the liberation of Latvia, changes in landownership, new technologies, and the Great Depression, they lived ordinary lives. They grew up within families; they knew their city, Riga; they went to school and university; they partied and had friends; they spent summers at the beach (Jūrmala); they fell in love, got married and started families – all in the full expectation of continuing to live where they had been born, in the society they knew. But this was not to be because war and conflict were changing the political map of Europe.

As a result of changing relations between Communist Russia and Nazi Germany during World War II, these Baltic people had to leave Latvia (just as they were beginning their careers and families) in their twenties and thirties. The ethnic Germans were resettled to Poland in 1939 and fled the advancing Russian army into Germany in 1944 or early 1945. The Latvians remained in Latvia during the war and fled to Germany also ahead of the Russian army in 1944. Five or six years later, they left Germany for Corner Brook, an industrial town on the west coast of Newfoundland. Corner Brook was a great distance, geographically and culturally, from everything they had known in their lives.

== Ernests Leja ==
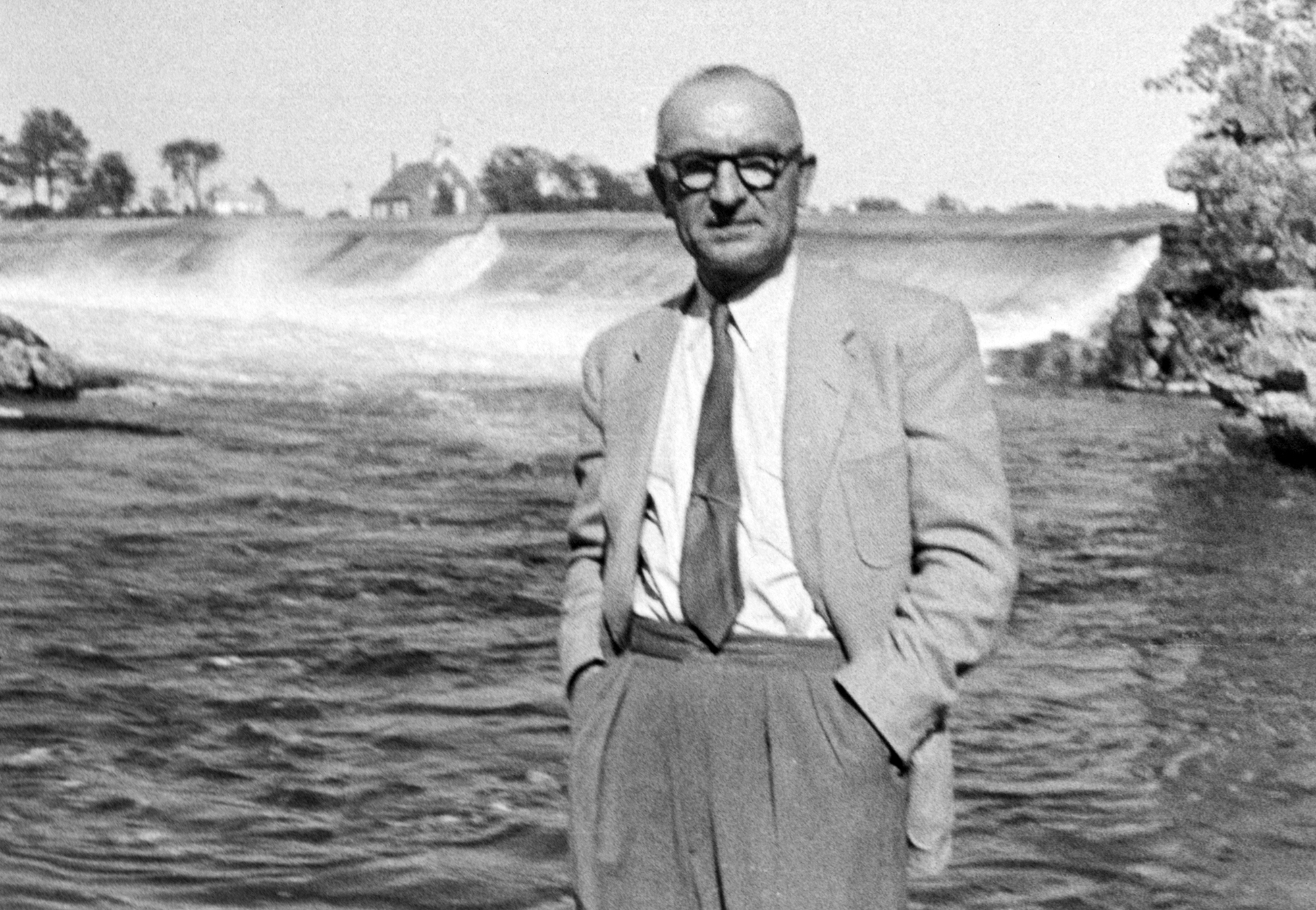
Ernests Albert Leja at Big Falls, Newfoundland, circa 1957.

The key person in their lives was the Latvian, Ernests Leja. An engineer, educated in Riga, who was a specialist in cement and the use of pre-stressed concrete in construction. Leja was described as daring and always willing to do what was necessary to survive and prosper. He was a devoted family man, loyal to his friends, and during his working life in Latvia and Germany developed key connections among the Latvians, Germans, Russians, British and, ultimately Newfoundlanders.

Many in the group who emigrated to Corner Brook would have met Leja through their social and business lives in Riga. They renewed their connection with him in Lower Saxony and, largely because of this, made the decision to emigrate to Newfoundland.

== Baltic Germans in Poland and World War II ==
In November 1939, the Baltic Germans were forced to leave Latvia under the terms of a German-Soviet neutrality pact. (The pact was signed on August 23, 1939, by Vyacheslav Molotov and Joachim von Ribbentrop, variously called the Molotov–Ribbentrop Pact, the Hitler-Stalin Pact, or the Nazi-Soviet Pact). They were given some support by the German government, were allowed to take some belongings with them, and were resettled in the Reichsgau Wartheland (Warthegau) in Poland. Ethnic Germans were given German citizenship and the men were expected to serve in the war.

The German war effort required cement and gypsum; a group of Baltic Germans, who had gained relevant expertise in Latvia, gathered to produce these products in the Warthegau. Those active in this industry (the engineers, entrepreneurs and mining managers) were considered essential to the war effort; other men were conscripted into, or volunteered to join, the Wehrmacht.

The women and essential workers set up new homes in houses that had belonged to the Nazi-evicted Polish population. Some women worked in offices or ran the businesses their husbands had to leave when they began service in the Wehrmacht. They all established what they considered normal lives, raising their children and taking care of their relatives. But after four years, when it became clear that Germany was losing the war, they began to plan for escape to Germany. The Baltic Germans greatly feared the Russian army and thought their best chance for survival was in the defeated German territories.

In early 1945, they fled just ahead of the Russians however they could, in wagons, on the last train out, walking, in the rush of people fleeing west ahead of the Russian army. They took only their loved ones and what they could carry with them. (Flight and Expulsion of Germans from Poland during and after World War II) (Evacuation and Flight into areas in Germany)

== Refugees in West Germany ==
By circuitous routes, these refugees made their way to Lower Saxony. The refugees settled in a small mid-German town, Stadtoldendorf, and the nearby towns of Bodenwerder and Bielefeld. The common threads that led them there were their expertise in cement and gypsum (essential to rebuilding Germany) and their connection to Ernests Leja. Working with some other German experts (Karl Jericho and Friedrich Kreiser, see Escape Hatch, G. Bassler) they designed and built a gypsum plant in Bodenwerder.

Allied occupied Germany was desperately trying to accommodate about 7 million displaced persons and refugees while providing for its own population after losing the war. The ethnic German Balts were not eligible for any support from the United Nations or the Allies because they had received German citizenship. They had to survive along with the local German population, competing with them for very scarce resources. They spoke German with a pronounced accent and were easily identified. They were, in fact, outsiders, refugees from another place and largely they were not accepted by the local population.

At first, the Baltic refugees were billeted in rooms in local homes. Food rationing and a lack of consumer goods meant that people often went hungry, clothes were worn until they fell apart and shoes with holes in the soles were common. The children started school, the fathers got work and the mothers did their best to provide food and a stable environment for the children. There was a certain post-war euphoria; massive relief that the men had returned having survived the war and prisoner of war camps. They loved to picnic and partied among themselves. Gradually, they were able to obtain their own accommodations and earn enough to provide food and clothing for their now growing families.

As mentioned earlier, the Latvians had a very different experience during the war years. In Germany, they were considered refugees or displaced persons. Many were housed in United Nations-sponsored DP camps. There the school age children attended school while their parents did their best to plan for their futures. The greatest hope was that Latvia would be liberated by the Allies. Barring this, they looked to emigrate to North America or Australia. Through their connection with people in the gypsum or cement industry, and through Ernest Leja, a small group made their way to Lower Saxony where they connected with Baltic Germans who shared the same geographic homeland.

These people had no homeland to return to in the post-war years. They were discriminated against, were impatient with the lack of opportunity in a slowly recovering Germany, and were concerned about the threat posed by communist Russia. They were by now in early middle age with growing families and sought the opportunity to live in a safe and prosperous land far from the communists.

== Newfoundland and Joseph R. Smallwood ==
Newfoundland joined Canada as its tenth province in April 1949 (Commission of Government and Confederation with Canada). At that time, the Newfoundland economy was based largely on fishing and was woefully deficient in infrastructure. Joseph Smallwood, its first premier, established the New Industries Program to provide employment, infrastructure and consumer goods. Two of the key elements for this infrastructure were cement and gypsum to build bridges, roads, schools and hospitals. The required expertise was not available locally and could not be attracted in nearby mainland Canada or in the United States.

Smallwood recognized that the experts he needed were among the many unemployed or underemployed refugees in early post-war Germany. Following on the advice of his then-director of economic development, Alfred Valdmanis, a Latvian refugee himself, Smallwood travelled to Germany to meet with industrialists, including Ernest Leja. Through Leja, Valdmanis also visited Bodenwerder gypsum plant.

== Corner Brook ==
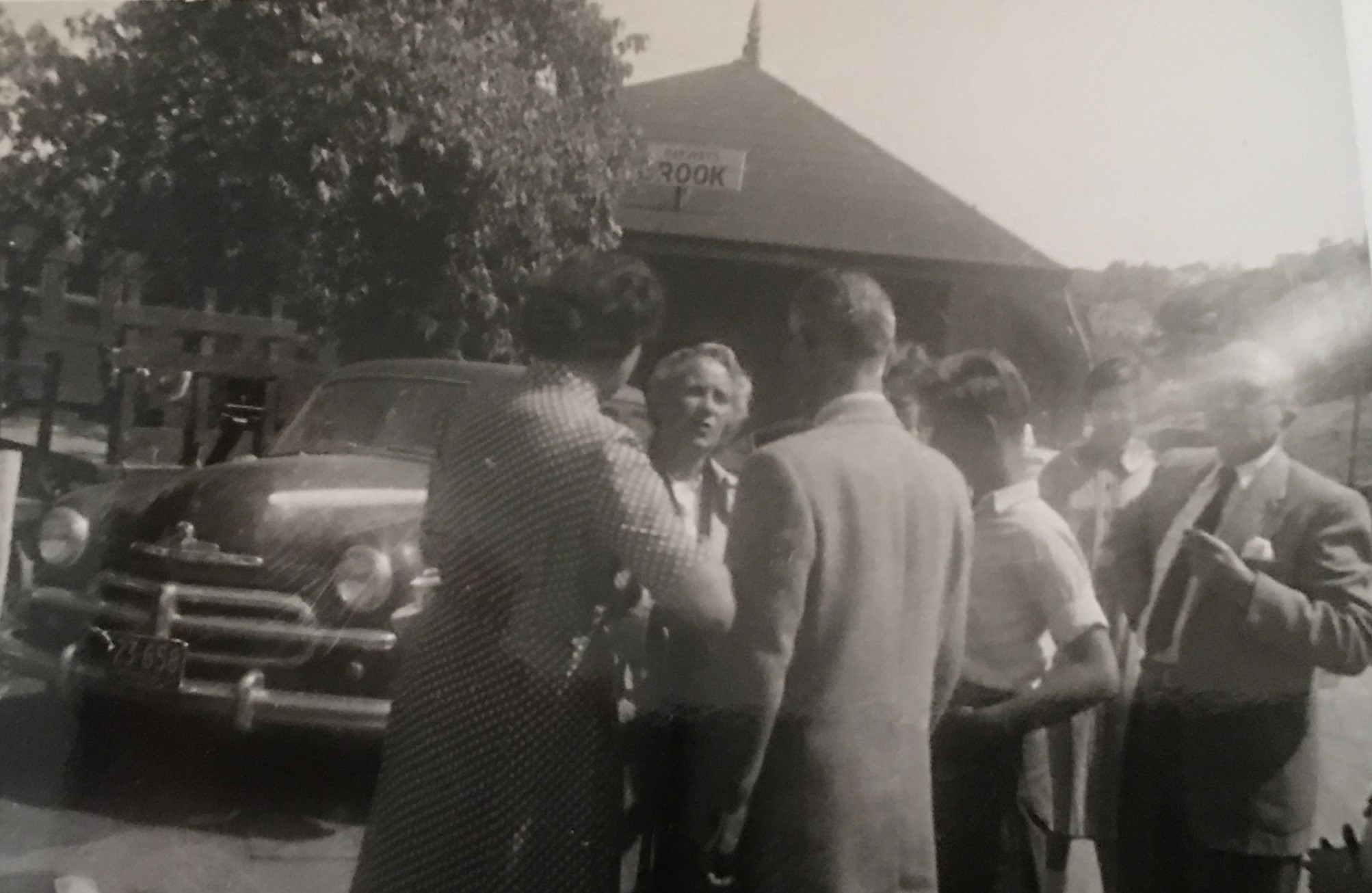
Edith Tietjens is welcomed by family upon her arrival at the train station in Corner Brook. 1954.

This group of Latvians and Baltic Germans made its way to Corner Brook between late 1949 and 1954. In some cases, the men came first and brought their wives and children later; in others families came together. Some flew over the Atlantic to Gander and then travelled by train, the Newfie Bullet, to Corner Brook; others crossed the North Atlantic in ships. A selection of first person recollections of arriving is available in an article in the Newfoundland Quarterly, Spring 2019, p. 24-27.

In Germany, most of these people had been unable to get much information about Newfoundland. They could see on a map that Corner Brook was geographically well south of Riga and they knew that English was the spoken language. They all experienced culture shock when they arrived on the island at the eastern edge of North America in an isolated town of 12,000 people. Corner Brook was connected to the world by ship and to the rest of the island by train; however, there were no roads that led more than a few miles out of town and no accessible airport. The local language, foods, world-view, customs and life-style were all very different from their own. The climate was much more severe than they expected with very long winters and short cool summers. What the immigrants shared with local Corner Brookers, though, was the post-war boom time with its expectation for a prosperous future. They were happy to have found a place that offered a peaceful life under a democratic government system that provided hope, freedom, education, and health care.

Finding lodgings in Corner Brook was a challenge. Some Balts were first housed in the barracks on Fern Street, very basic housing that had been erected to house construction workers building a tuberculosis sanatorium. Some, not only the men who came alone but also families, were boarded in homes. A few stayed for a time in the local hotel, the Glynmill Inn. Eventually several families lived at 11 East Valley Road or on Reid Street. Four homes at the upper end of Caribou Road were built specifically for their immigrant workers by W. J. Lundrigan's. A number of managers and workers of North Star Cement and Atlantic Gypsum built homes near the cement plant on Ingrid Lane, referred to by locals as Little Berlin.

Learning enough English to get along was key. The children started school immediately and learned English quickly; they were placed in classrooms with the local children and expected to learn as if by osmosis. Most tell the same story: in their first set of exams, they excelled in math and failed in all courses that required the English language. A few months later, they had caught up and were doing well in all subjects. The men learned English quickly, mostly on the job, but also by going to movies, reading dime store novels and taking instruction given by a couple of local teachers. Some of the women who stayed at home didn't ever master the English language; however, most became fluent, though retaining definite accents.

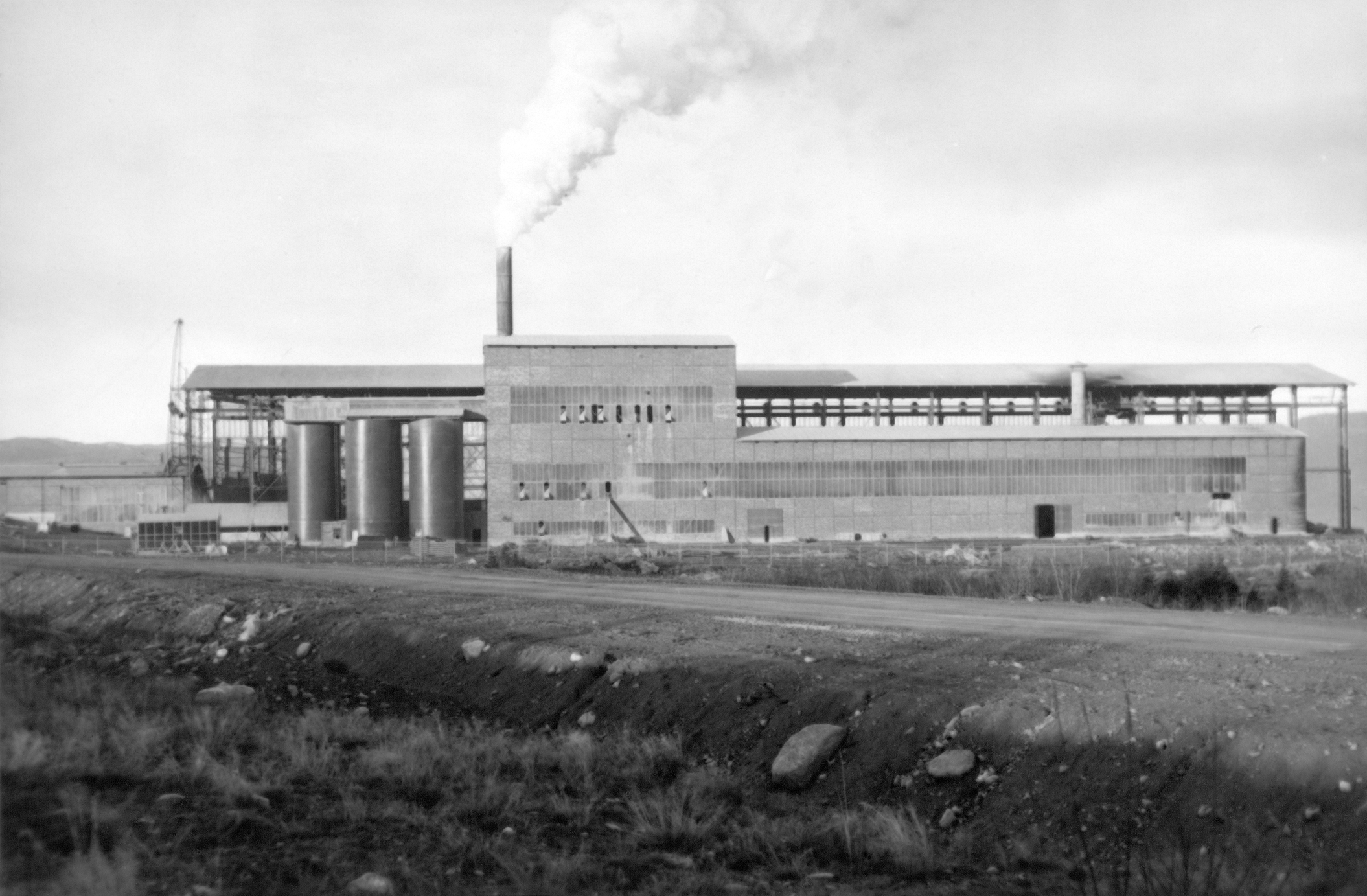
North Star Cement plant under construction, circa 1952.

The men worked primarily in three local businesses, North Star Cement, Atlantic Gypsum and W. J. Lundrigan's Limited. The first group of immigrants was involved in building and managing the cement and gypsum plants and they soon invited other Balts and Germans to immigrate to provide management and production expertise and to train local workers. The Lundrigan group of companies specialized in construction and were the main builders of bridges, roads and many institutional buildings; the company built roads not only around Corner Brook, but also around the island. Ernests Leja's expertise in pre-stressed concrete was crucial to this development. Two of the women had dental practices in Corner Brook. Most of the women were not employed, or worked for a short time only to help support their families.

In the early 1950s, Corner Brook was an industrial town centred on a paper mill, at the time owned and operated by Bowater's, a company based in England. In the late 1940s, Bowater's recruited Baltic experts, who had been identified in the United Nations refugee camps as experts in paper production. These families (Bērziņš, Buliņš and Langins) were able to emigrate out of Germany before Confederation and were already in Corner Brook when the others arrived.

Most of the adult Baltic immigrants interacted with local people at work, in commercial establishments and in their neighbourhoods. They were friendly and passed the time of day, but they didn't become close friends with many local people. Their social lives were centered in the Baltic community where they shared a common heritage and common concerns. Some individuals participated in local activities, joining a church choir, drama club, a local orchestra, creating a ski club, badminton club or the rod and gun club. Others did not participate at all and a few learned almost no English.

Other Germans from West Germany also came to Corner Brook to work in the cement and gypsum industries. In varying degrees, they interacted with the Balts who were already there. Their experience of the war and post war times had been different and they had a homeland they could return to. Several remained in Corner Brook for only a few years; others came with their families and stayed. A few married local women and started families in Corner Brook.

Local people must have regarded these immigrants with suspicion, after all they had been, only a few years earlier, the enemy. They generally didn't make a distinction between the Germans and the Latvians, referring to both as Germans. Newfoundland hospitality, openness and willingness to help meant that they were able to live harmoniously among the local population.

== The Baltic Teenagers and Children ==
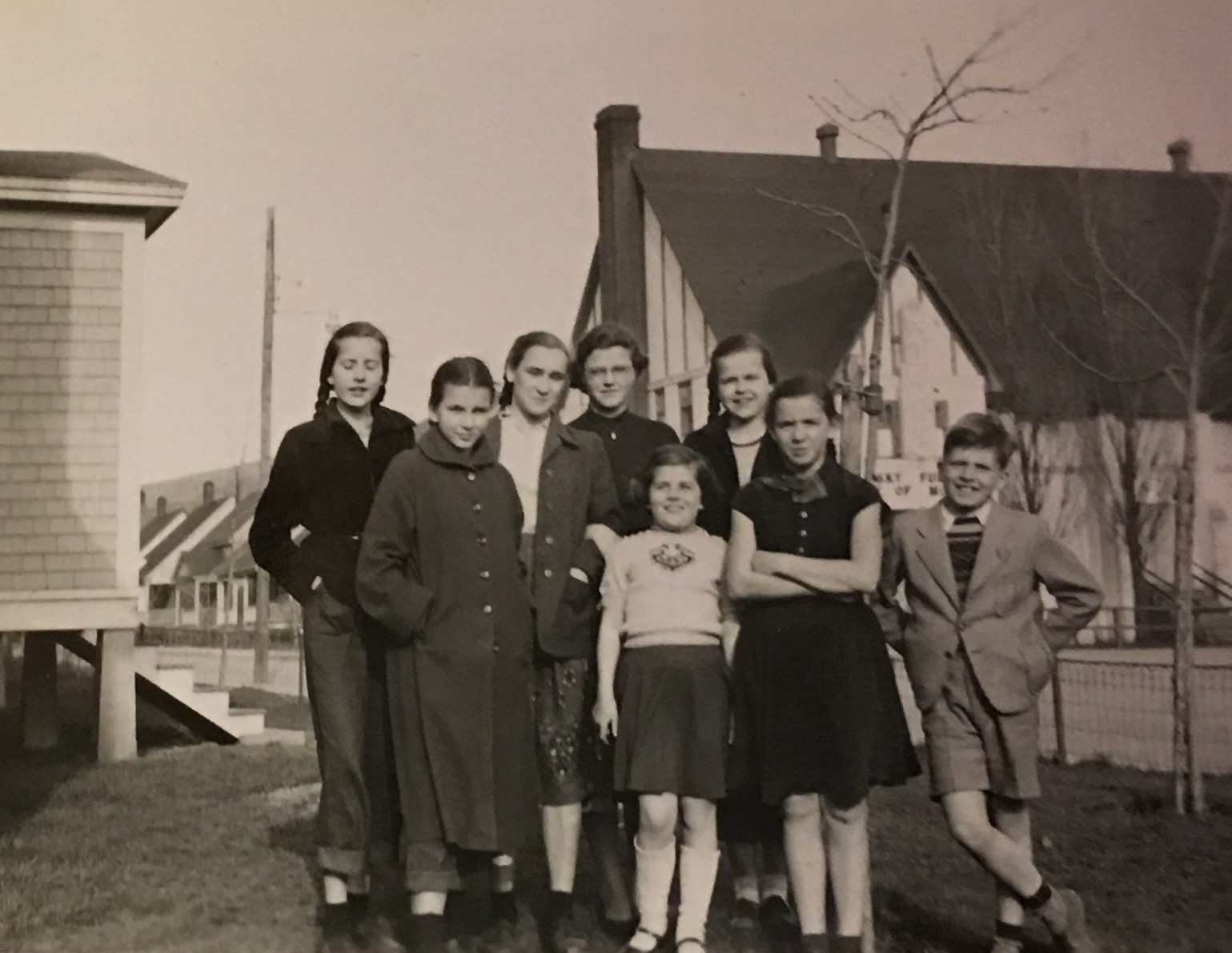
Baltic children in the front garden of 11 East Valley Road with the Majestic Theatre in the background. Left to right: Sabine Frey, Ursula Rodsewicz, Ursula Matschen, Ilze Bumbulis, Renate Staeben, Birgit Frey, Karin Matschen, Bernd Staeben. 1953.

The Baltic children ranged in age from infants to teenagers (one family had another child born in Corner Brook). The older children had experienced life in Europe, and some have memories of the war and fleeing the Russians. Some have kept contact with friends they made in Germany. Learning English was more difficult for some who, now in their eighties, still spoke with German or Latvian accents. The teenagers found school challenging at first. Some integrated well and had active social lives, while being considered somewhat exotic. However, most of them spent only a few years in Corner Brook and have only a tenuous connection to Newfoundland.

The younger children who received all, or most of, their education in Corner Brook schools integrated quite closely with the local children. They came to school already fluent in English. But while they integrated well in the classroom and participated in extracurricular sports and activities, they were always identifiable and, to a certain extent, kept apart because of their names and the way they were socialized. At home they spoke German or Latvian, heard different stories, heard discussions about politics and world affairs from a different perspective, and experienced different customs.

Almost all the Baltic children did well in school academically; further, among the immigrant parents,there was an expectation that the children would seek higher education and look for opportunities in the rest of North America. A final diaspora began when, in their late teens, the Baltic children went to St. John's, Halifax, Fredericton, Montreal and Toronto to study. These young adults earned their higher degrees or practical diplomas, met their life mates, and most of them established themselves elsewhere in Canada or the United States. Their connection to each other and their Baltic heritage is becoming increasingly tenuous.

Four Baltic children remained on the island and married Newfoundlanders; one in Corner Brook (Bernd Staeben) and two in St. John's (Heddy Peddle and Gunar Leja). Klaus Staeben (died in 2007) also married a Newfoundlander. Two girls (Ilga Leja and Susanne Hynes, née Rodsewicz) married Newfoundlanders and left the island to live in Halifax and Toronto. Several of the German families who came later have also remained in Newfoundland: Schultz, Dlugosch, Meiwald, Suske, Binder and Bachmann.

== The Families ==
=== Latvians ===
Berziņš, Aleksandrs and ?; children Astrida

Buliņš, Kārlis and Edīte; children Valda and Ilze

Jaunzemis, Peter and Elsa; adopted child Loretta

Kajaks: Richard and Mirdza

Langins, Ernest and Junija; children Janis and Liga

Leja: Ernest and Lilija; children Ilga and Gunar

Obrazcova, Kira and Lloyd Candow (Newfoundlander); children Christopher and Sandra

Prorins, Maksis and Olga; children Ilze and Astrida (step-daughter)

Ruciņš: Guido and Matilde (Tilla)

Sermūksnis: Paul and Minna

Stakle, Elmars and Erna; children Ilona, Valdis, Imants, Daina and Gunta

Šteinbergs, Alexanders and Jenny

Treibergs

Zīriņš, Gustavs and ?

=== Baltic Germans ===
Binder, Edgar and Lydia; children: William

Frey, Horst and Karin; children Sabine, Birgit, Bengt

Linde, Konstantins

Matschen, Herbert and Gerda; children Ursula and Karin

Rodsewicz (von Eitmin), Stanislaus and Heimtrud; children Ursula and Susanne

Staeben, Heinrich and Edith; children Klaus, Bernd, Renate, Erika

Tietjens, Edith

Tode, Hans and Ingrid; children Wolf and Heddy

Other Germans Anstatt, Franz and Annie; children Heidi and Roy

Bachmann, Heinrich and Elizabeth; children Ralph, Regina, Tony, Doris and Monica

Baumann, Ludwig and Greta?, children Ingrid and Rita

Brych, Joseph and Martha, children Felicitas, Gotthardt, Egbert

Dlugosch, Georg and Hanna; children Hannelore and Gunter

Jakob, Walter

Jericho, Karl and Gerda; children Renate, Manfred, Klaus

Kreuzberg

Meiwald, Hermann and Hazel (Newfoundlander); children Donald and Elizabeth

Meyer, Max and Margo; children Sophia and Max

Reibling, Arthur and Irma; children Heidi and Klaus

Schulz, Werner and Charlotte; children Christine, Werner, Susan, David

Suske, Peter

Von Paris, Sylvia

== Other Baltic and German People in Newfoundland and Canada ==
The New Industries Program brought many other Latvians and Germans to other Newfoundland communities between 1950 and 1970. Extensive information about them is available in books and articles by Gerhard Bassler (see footnote 2).

Many Baltic Germans and Latvians immigrated to the rest of Canada after the war. While the Corner Brook Balts share a common Baltic heritage and war experience with Baltic people in the rest of Canada, their experience in the New World is different in two fundamental ways. Firstly, people in the Corner Brook group were invited to come and were immediately employed in their areas of expertise. In the rest of Canada, Latvians and Baltic Germans had to work on the land as a condition of their immigration, moving into their chosen professions only after their time as agricultural workers. Secondly, the Corner Brook Balts were much more isolated. In 1948, the mainland Baltic Germans established an organization, the Canadian Baltic Immigrant Aid Society (CBIAS), to provide support and to preserve their Baltic heritage. In 2017 the CBIAS sponsored an exhibit at Tartu College, University of Toronto: Sharing our Stories: The Baltic Diaspora at Home in Canada, and sponsored events celebrating 70 years in Canada in 2018. They also publish a semi-annual newsletter, Blaue Briefe. They are also creating an archive of related materials including documents, photographs and oral histories.

Latvians in the rest of Canada have also established institutions to preserve their culture, language and heritage such as the Latvian National Federation in Canada. In 2019, Latvia is an independent country and it is possible for people with this heritage to visit or resettle in their homeland.

== Sources ==
Much of the information in this article comes from interviews with Baltic children who were born between 1937 and 1942 in Latvia, Poland, and Germany. They emigrated to Newfoundland with their parents. Interviews were held and recorded in 2017. Photographs, diaries, and other original documents were also consulted.
