= Corner Brook =

- City
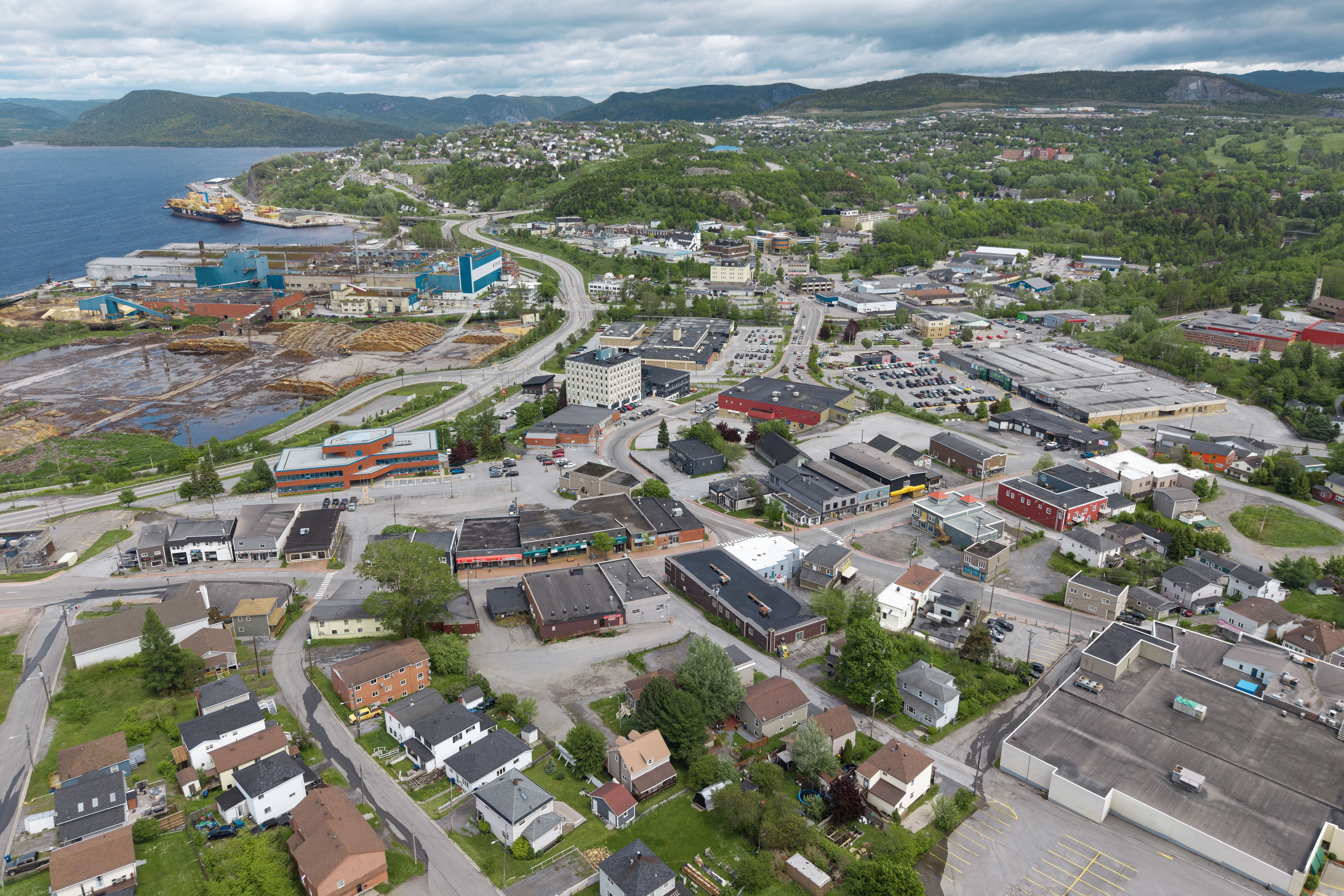
- Overlooking City of Corner Brook

- Flag Coat of arms
- Motto: "Our Spirit... Your Success"
- Location of Corner Brook in Newfoundland Corner Brook (Newfoundland and Labrador)
- Coordinates: 48°57′N 57°57′W
- Country: Canada
- Province: Newfoundland and Labrador
- Census division: 5
- Amalgamation: 1956

Government
  - Type: Municipal
  - Mayor: Linda Chaisson
  - MHA: Jim Parsons (L); Eddie Joyce (IND)
  - MP: Carol Anstey (C)

Area
  - City: 147.88 km^{2} (57.10 sq mi)
  - Metro: 255.10 km^{2} (98.49 sq mi)
- Elevation: 0–304 m (0–997 ft)

Population (2021)
  - City: 19,316
  - Metro: 29,762
- Time zone: UTC-3:30 (Newfoundland Time)
  - Summer (DST): UTC-2:30 (Newfoundland Daylight)
- Area code: 709
- Highways: Route 1 (TCH); Route 440 Route 450 Route 450A
- Website: cornerbrook.com

Corner Brook (2021 population: 19,316 CA 29,762) is a city located on the west coast of the island of Newfoundland in the province of Newfoundland and Labrador, Canada. Corner Brook is the fifth largest settlement in Newfoundland and Labrador, and the largest outside the Avalon Peninsula.

Located on the Bay of Islands at the mouth of the Humber River, the city is the second-largest population centre in the province behind St. John's, and smallest of three cities behind St. John's and Mount Pearl. As such, Corner Brook functions as a service centre for western and northern Newfoundland. It is located on the same latitude as Gaspé, Quebec, a city of similar size and landscape on the other side of the Gulf of St. Lawrence. Corner Brook is the most northern city in Atlantic Canada.

It is the administrative headquarters of the Qalipu Mi'kmaq First Nations band government.

== History ==
The area was surveyed by Captain James Cook in 1767. The Captain James Cook Historic Site stands on Crow Hill overlooking the city. By the middle of the 19th century, the population of Corner Brook was less than 100, and the inhabitants were engaged in fishing and lumber work.

The area was originally four distinct communities, each with unique commercial activities: Curling, with its fishery; Corner Brook West (also known as Humber West or Westside) with its retail businesses; Corner Brook East (also known as Humbermouth and the Heights) with its railway and industrial operations; and Townsite (known as Corner Brook) to house employees of the pulp and paper mill, laid out in 1923 by Thomas Adams using Garden City principles. In 1956, these four communities were amalgamated to form the present-day City of Corner Brook.

Between 1948 and 1958, about 70 people from Latvia and Germany settled in Corner Brook. They came as part of then Premier Joseph Smallwood's New Industries program. They built and worked at North Star Cement and the Atlantic Gypsum Plant. (For more history on the subject, see Latvians and Baltic Germans in Corner Brook.)

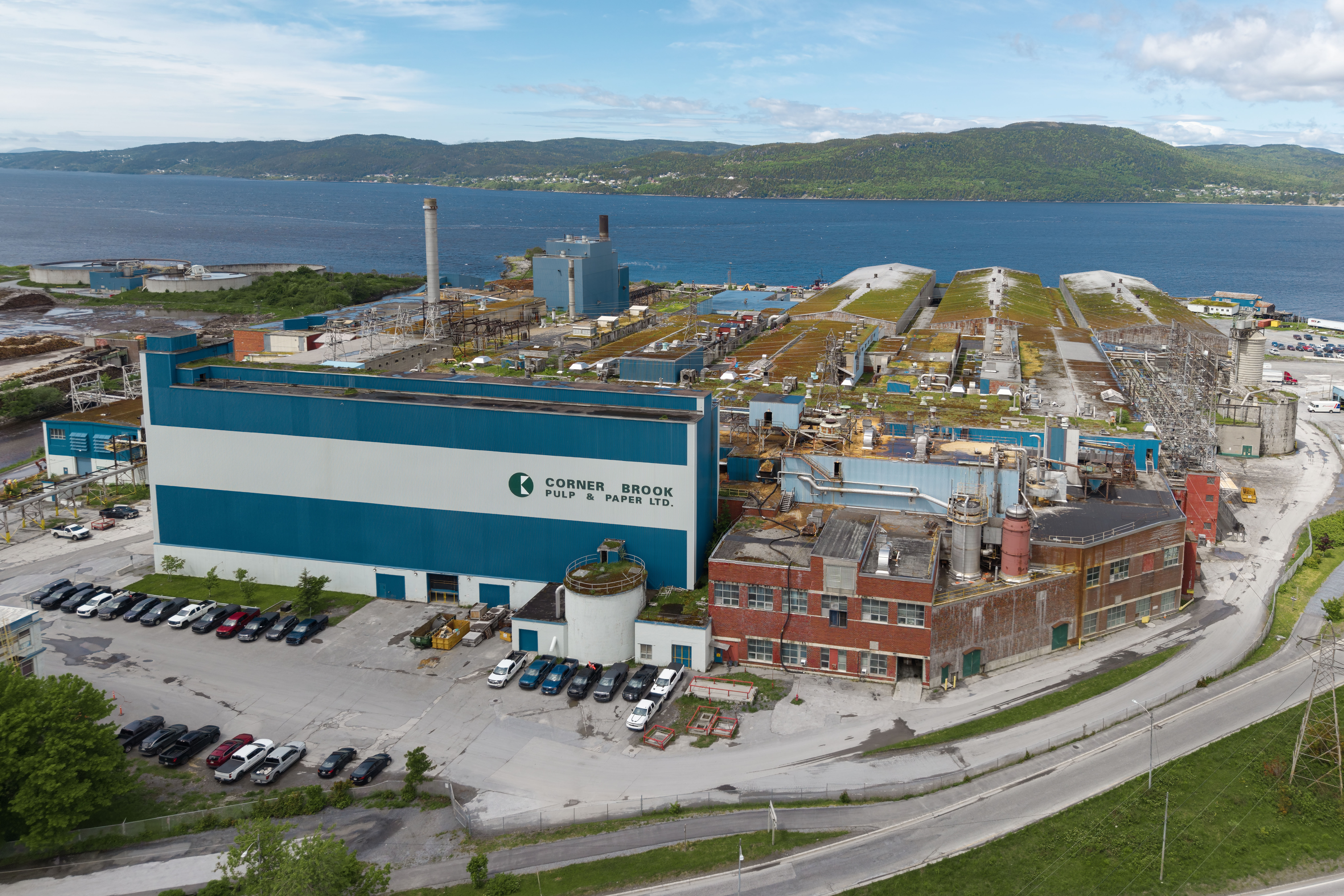
The Corner Brook Pulp & Paper Mill

Corner Brook is home to the Corner Brook Pulp & Paper Mill (owned by Kruger Inc.), which is a major employer for the region. The city has the largest regional hospital in western Newfoundland. The Western Memorial Regional Hospital opened to patients and clients on June 2, 2024. It also has a wide array of shopping and retail businesses and federal and provincial government offices. It is home to Grenfell Campus, Memorial University, as well as campuses of Academy Canada and College of the North Atlantic.

Corner Brook celebrated its Come Home Year from July 19–28, 2019.

== Demographics ==
Historical Census Data - Corner Brook
Year	Pop.	±%
1945	5,464	—
1951	13,835	+153.2%
1956	23,225	+67.9%
1961	25,185	+8.4%
1971	26,309	+4.5%
1981	24,339	−7.5%
1986	22,719	−6.7%
1991	22,410	−1.4%
1996	21,893	−2.3%
2001	20,103	−8.2%
2006	20,083	−0.1%
2011	19,886	−1.0%
2016	19,806	−0.4%
2021	19,316	−2.5%
The 1945 and 1951 population figures have been adjusted to reflect the city's amalgamation on January 1, 1956. Source: Statistics Canada

In the 2021 Census of Population conducted by Statistics Canada, Corner Brook had a population of 19,316 living in 8,868 of its 9,552 total private dwellings, a change of −2.5% from its 2016 population of 19,806. With a land area of 147.88 km^{2} (57.10 sq mi), it had a population density of 130.7/km^{2} (338.6/sq mi) in 2021.

=== Ethnic origin ===
Canada 2016 Census		Population	% of Total population
Visible minority group Source:	South Asian	85	0.3
Visible minority group Source:	Chinese	40	0.1
Visible minority group Source:	Black	65	0.2
Visible minority group Source:	Filipino	100	0.3
Visible minority group Source:	Latin American	0	0.0
Visible minority group Source:	Southeast Asian	0	0.0
Visible minority group Source:	Other visible minority	45	0.1
Total visible minority population		330	1.0
Aboriginal group Source:	First Nations	8,670	27.7
Aboriginal group Source:	Métis	525	1.7
Aboriginal group Source:	Inuit	265	0.8
Total Aboriginal population		9,240	29.5
White		21,720	69.4
Total population		31,290	100.0

=== Languages ===
Home Language (2021)
Language	Population	Percentage (%)
English	18,470	98%
French	15	0%
Other	235	1%

Mother Tongue (2021)
Language	Population	Percentage (%)
English	18,255	97%
French	70	0%
Other	390	2%

== Sports ==
Near Corner Brook is Marble Mountain Ski Resort, a downhill skiing resort, and Blow-Me-Down trails, a cross country ski area.

The Corner Brook Royals currently play in the West Coast Senior Hockey League and were the winners of the 1986 National Title, the Allan Cup. The Royals play home games at the Corner Brook Civic Centre, formerly called the Canada Games Centre and the Pepsi Center. The arena was built in 1997 and was one of the main venues used when the city of Corner Brook hosted the 1999 Canada Games. The Corner Brook Civic Centre is currently owned by The City of Corner Brook.

Corner Brook hosted the Special Olympics Provincial Winter Games in February 2011. The city also twice hosted Raid the North Extreme, a televised six-day multi-sport expedition race held in wilderness locations across Canada, and was a leg of the ITU World Cup Triathlon.

In 2004, Corner Brook hosted the annual World Broomball Championship.

The 2026 Newfoundland and Labrador Summer Games was hosted in both Corner Brook and Stephenville. The event was held between August 8 and August 15, 2026.

== Arts and culture ==
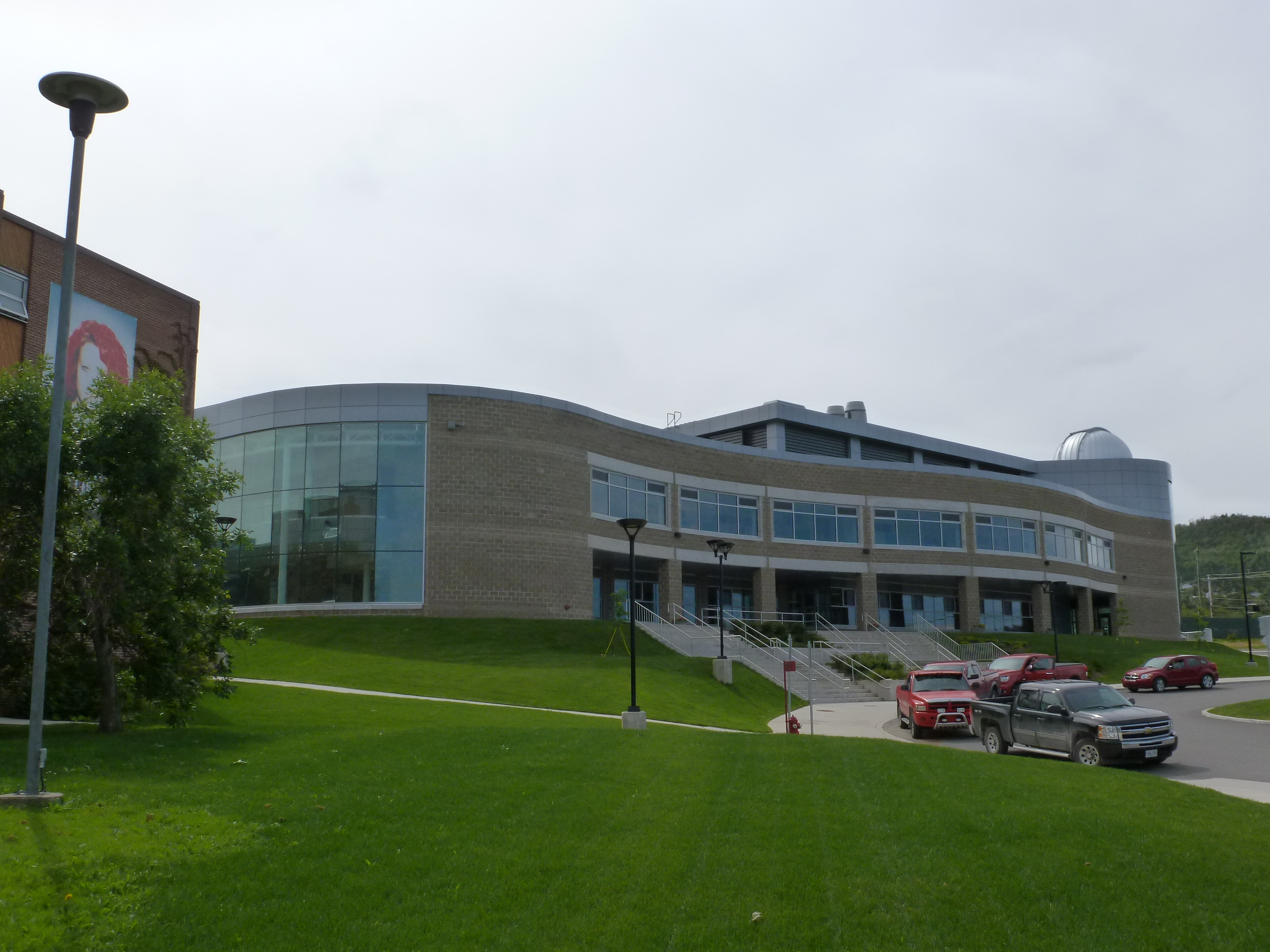
The Arts and Science building of Grenfell Campus, Corner Brook

Corner Brook is home to Grenfell Campus, Memorial University, where a strong arts community exists both within the school and well into the public. The campus houses the Grenfell Art Gallery. The Corner Brook Arts and Culture Centre among other institutions thrive in promoting the arts on all levels from visual arts to theatre. In 2015, the City's newest theatre and gallery, the Rotary Arts Centre, opened.

Theatre Newfoundland Labrador is Corner Brook's professional theatre company. It was founded in 1979 by Maxim Mazumdar, and it operates a year-round professional theatre company from its home base, Corner Brook. From September to May, their Sarah McDonald Youth Theatre offers classes in acting, stagecraft and music to youth aged 6 to 8 and produces several youth and community-oriented productions in and around the city. From May to September, it puts together a professional repertory summer festival in Cow Head, Gros Morne National Park and regular national and international touring of plays like Tempting Providence by Robert Chafe, With Cruel Times in Between by Sarah McDonald, based on the various works by Al Pittman and Our Frances by Berni Stapleton.

Corner Brook is home to Gros Morne Summer Music, a classical music festival that spans July and August. The Hangashore Folk Festival was a folk festival based in Corner Brook from 1980 to 1994.

For 32 years, the March Hare literary festival ran every March. It celebrated poetry and written works by poets and writers from around Newfoundland and Labrador, Canada, and the world. Atlantic Canada's largest poetry festival was founded in the late 1980s by poet and playwright Al Pittman and Corner Brook author and historian Rex Brown. The last March Hare was held in 2018.

Corner Brook is also home to the region's only community radio station, BayFM (CKVB-FM 100.1, or BOIR). The station was previously only available online. However, the station received its broadcast licence from the Canadian Radio-television and Telecommunications Commission on October 6, 2016, and commenced FM broadcasting on November 5, 2017. The radio station is located on Cobb Lane, in the city's downtown district.

== Municipal government ==
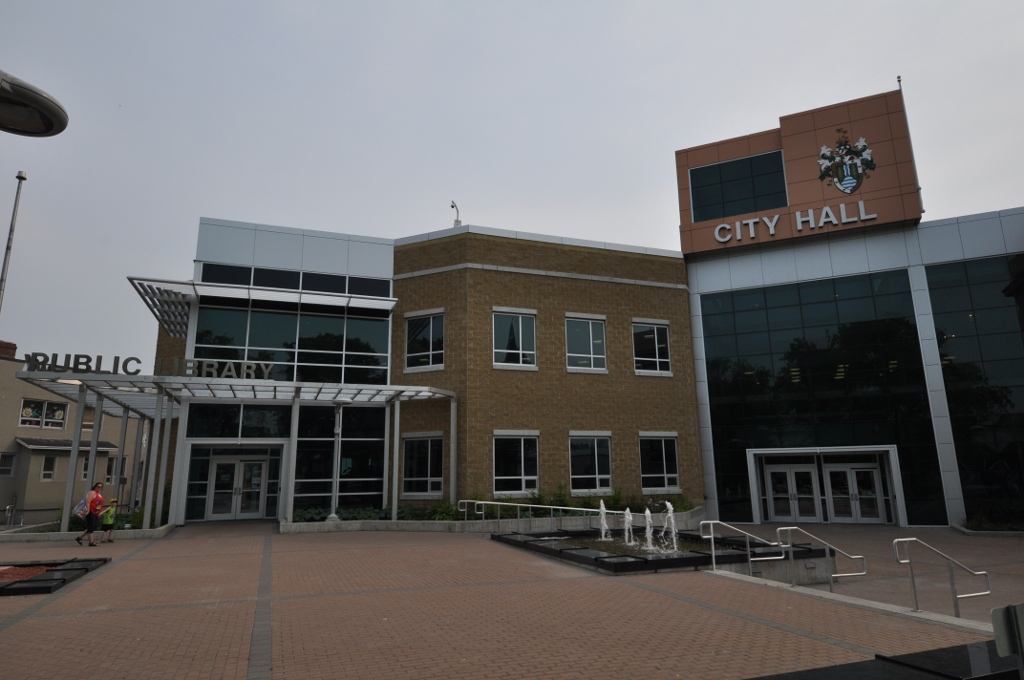
The City Hall building for Corner Brook

The Corner Brook City Council has six city councillors and a mayor. The highest voting winning councillor becomes Deputy Mayor. The current mayor of the city is Linda Chaisson. The deputy mayor is Pamela Keeping. Municipal elections in Corner Brook are held every four years on the last Tuesday in September. In the 2025 municipal elections held on October 2, 2025, Linda Chaisson was elected mayor.

== Transportation ==
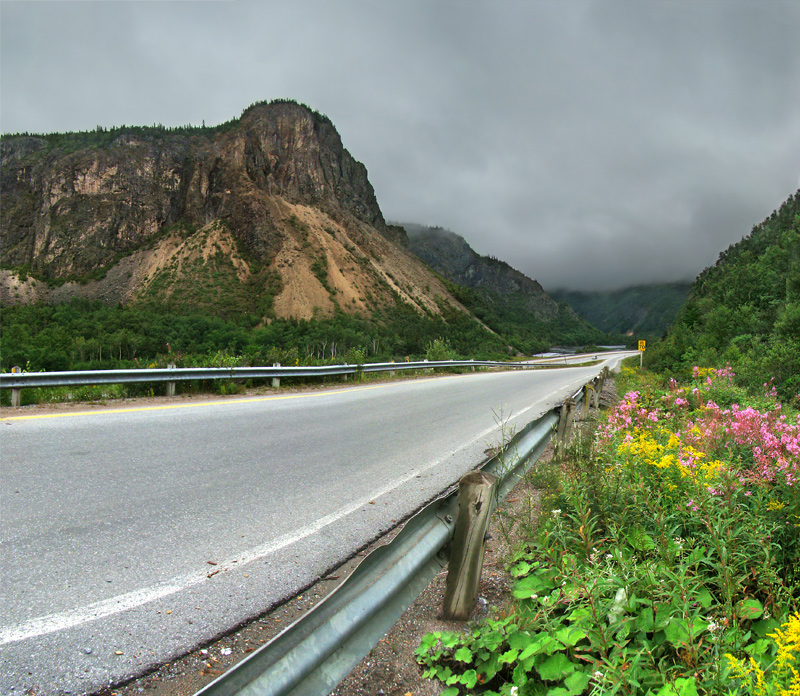
Along the Trans-Canada Highway

Route 1, the Trans-Canada Highway, passes the south side of the city on a high ridge before descending to the east into the Humber Valley.

The city is accessed by air services at Deer Lake Regional Airport, 55 km (34 mi) northeast.

Corner Brook Transit is a privately operated local bus service. The city is also served by four taxi cab companies.

== Climate ==
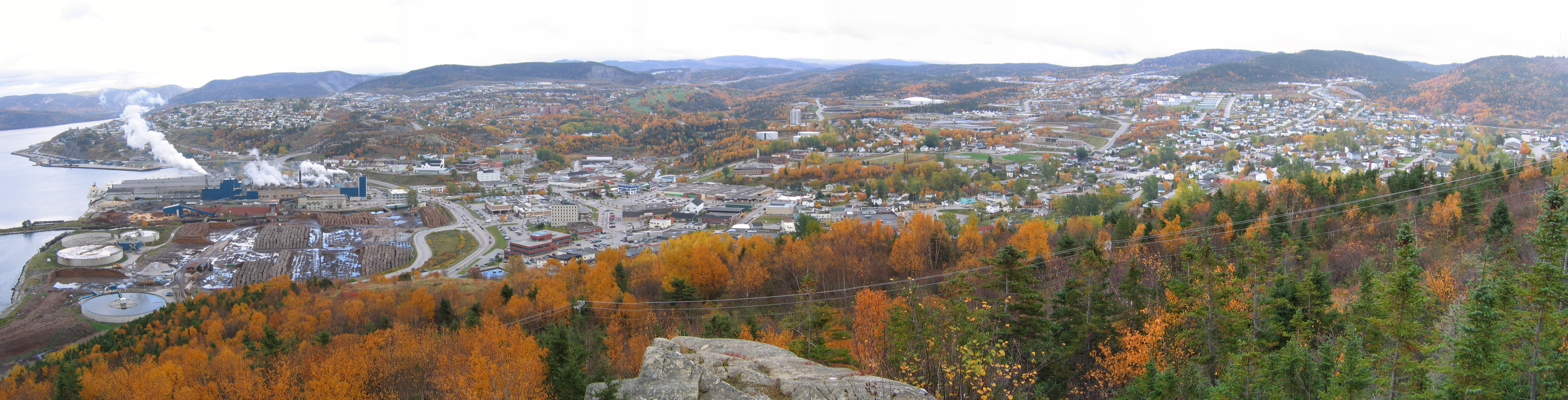
Corner Brook

Corner Brook has a humid continental climate (Dfb) typical of most of Newfoundland. It is warmer in summer than St. John's due to less maritime exposure, whereas winters are colder than in the provincial capital. In terms of its overall climate, it is very maritime-like, especially considering how the climate is in mainland Canada on similar latitudes. Precipitation is heavy year-round but highest in December and January and lowest in April and May, with relatively dry, stable conditions extending into July many years.

The Corner Brook area lies in an especially heavy snow belt because of cold Arctic air masses from mainland Canada, coming from the west or northwest, crossing the waters of the Gulf of St. Lawrence and picking up moisture, resulting in "sea-effect" snow. This is similar to "lake effect" snow in US locations like Muskegon and Sault Ste. Marie, Michigan. The "sea effect" snow comes in addition to the heavy snow that can accompany mid-latitude storms, called "nor'easters," that approach the area from the U.S. Northeastern and New England states. Such storms can bring high winds and heavy precipitation, with possibly changing precipitation types in a single storm. The combination of intense winter storms and "sea effect" snow make December and January the wettest months on average in Corner Brook. In December and January combined, average snowfall reaches nearly 200 centimetres (79 in).

Climate data for Corner Brook Climate ID: 7103536; coordinates 48°56′N 57°55′W; elevation: 151.8 m (498 ft); WMO ID: 71973; 1991–2020 normals, extremes 1933–present
Month	Jan	Feb	Mar	Apr	May	Jun	Jul	Aug	Sep	Oct	Nov	Dec	Year
Record high humidex	18.3	14.5	19.4	19.7	28.1	40.2	38.4	40.1	36.5	31.0	26.3	20.1	40.2
Record high °C (°F)	15.9 (60.6)	14.3 (57.7)	19.9 (67.8)	22.5 (72.5)	27.2 (81.0)	33.3 (91.9)	34.4 (93.9)	34.4 (93.9)	31.1 (88.0)	25.2 (77.4)	21.7 (71.1)	16.7 (62.1)	34.4 (93.9)
Mean daily maximum °C (°F)	−2.6 (27.3)	−2.5 (27.5)	0.9 (33.6)	6.2 (43.2)	12.6 (54.7)	18.3 (64.9)	22.8 (73.0)	22.4 (72.3)	17.6 (63.7)	10.9 (51.6)	5.1 (41.2)	0.3 (32.5)	9.3 (48.7)
Daily mean °C (°F)	−6.2 (20.8)	−6.6 (20.1)	−3.6 (25.5)	1.8 (35.2)	7.4 (45.3)	13.0 (55.4)	17.6 (63.7)	17.5 (63.5)	13.0 (55.4)	7.1 (44.8)	2.0 (35.6)	−2.7 (27.1)	5.0 (41.0)
Mean daily minimum °C (°F)	−9.9 (14.2)	−10.7 (12.7)	−8.1 (17.4)	−2.6 (27.3)	2.1 (35.8)	7.6 (45.7)	12.4 (54.3)	12.5 (54.5)	8.3 (46.9)	3.2 (37.8)	−1.2 (29.8)	−5.7 (21.7)	0.7 (33.3)
Record low °C (°F)	−31.7 (−25.1)	−31.7 (−25.1)	−29.4 (−20.9)	−19.1 (−2.4)	−7.2 (19.0)	−4.4 (24.1)	1.1 (34.0)	0.0 (32.0)	−2.8 (27.0)	−7.8 (18.0)	−16.1 (3.0)	−20.6 (−5.1)	−31.7 (−25.1)
Record low wind chill	−34.3	−41.0	−34.9	−25.9	−11.4	−5.6	0.0	0.0	−2.0	−9.4	−19.8	−25.4	−41.0
Average precipitation mm (inches)	139.9 (5.51)	117.6 (4.63)	100.6 (3.96)	79.0 (3.11)	85.0 (3.35)	80.5 (3.17)	88.2 (3.47)	107.5 (4.23)	111.7 (4.40)	119.4 (4.70)	127.1 (5.00)	136.4 (5.37)	1,292.9 (50.90)
Average rainfall mm (inches)	41.5 (1.63)	25.1 (0.99)	41.7 (1.64)	50.1 (1.97)	80.0 (3.15)	80.4 (3.17)	88.2 (3.47)	107.5 (4.23)	111.7 (4.40)	113.6 (4.47)	93.0 (3.66)	52.6 (2.07)	885.4 (34.86)
Average snowfall cm (inches)	98.8 (38.9)	93.2 (36.7)	58.5 (23.0)	28.7 (11.3)	5.0 (2.0)	0.1 (0.0)	0.0 (0.0)	0.0 (0.0)	0.0 (0.0)	5.7 (2.2)	33.9 (13.3)	83.9 (33.0)	407.6 (160.5)
Average precipitation days (≥ 0.2 mm)	23.7	19.4	17.1	15.1	15.8	14.2	14.4	15.1	15.9	19.5	20.6	23.5	214.4
Average rainy days (≥ 0.2 mm)	5.1	4.4	6.5	10.4	15.1	14.2	14.4	15.1	15.9	19.1	15.1	9.2	144.5
Average snowy days (≥ 0.2 cm)	21.6	17.8	14.0	7.4	1.9	0.04	0.0	0.0	0.0	1.6	9.3	18.0	91.6
Average relative humidity (%) (at 1500 LST)	81.9	78.4	69.9	63.7	60.1	59.2	61.2	62.9	67.2	72.1	77.9	82.4	69.7
Source: Environment Canada

== Notable people ==
- Ian Arthur, politician
- Keith Brown, National Hockey League player
- Brian Byrne, former lead singer of rock band I Mother Earth
- Frank Coleman, businessman
- Allison Crowe, musician
- Donald B. Dingwell, scientist
- Sean Durfy, businessman and former CEO of WestJet
- Irma Gerd, drag queen who competed on Canada's Drag Race Season 3
- Gary Graham, music teacher, Order of NL recipient
- Doug Grant, National Hockey League goaltender
- Bruce Grobbelaar, former professional soccer goalkeeper
- Percy Janes, author
- Susan Kent, actress
- Jason King, National Hockey League player
- Joe Lundrigan, National Hockey League player
- Adriana Maggs, actress, director, and writer
- Trent McClellan, comedian
- Dick Nolan, musician
- Al Pittman, poet and playwright
- Mary C. Sheppard, author and journalist

== See also ==
- List of cities and towns in Newfoundland and Labrador
- Blomidon Golf & Country Club
- Corner Brook Civic Centre
- Corner Brook Regional High
- Grenfell Campus
- Herdman Collegiate (High School)
- Latvians and Baltic Germans in Corner Brook, Newfoundland
- Marble Mountain Ski Resort
