= Baltic Germans =

Ethnic Germans living around the Baltic Sea

German: Deutsch-Balten

Regions with significant populations
- c. 5,200 (Germans currently in Latvia and Estonia, not necessarily Baltic Germans in the same historical and cultural sense)
- Estonia: 2,701
- Latvia: 2,554
- Historically: Terra Mariana; Duchy of Courland; Duchy of Estonia; Duchy of Livonia

Languages
- Low German, High German; Baltic German (historically)

Religion
- Lutheran majority Roman Catholic minority

Related ethnic groups
- Germanic peoples, Germans, Germans in Russia, Estonian Swedes, German diaspora; more distantly Livonians, Estonians, Latvians;

Baltic Germans (Note: German: Deutsch-Balten or Deutschbalten, later Baltendeutsche; Estonian: Baltisakslased; Latvian: Vācbaltieši; Livonian: Līwõdsaksad; Latgalian: Baļtejis vuocīši) are a historical community of German speakers living in the Baltic Sea region, mostly modern Estonia and Latvia. After 1945, their numbers drastically declined, with many relocating to Germany or elsewhere.

Since the Late Middle Ages, native German-speakers formed the majority of merchants and clergy, and the large majority of the Baltic nobility who effectively constituted a ruling class over indigenous Latvian and Estonian non-nobles. By the time a distinct Baltic German ethnic identity began emerging in the 19th century, the majority of self-identifying Baltic Germans were non-nobles belonging mostly to the urban and professional middle class.

In the 12th and 13th centuries, Catholic German traders and crusaders (see Ostsiedlung) began settling in the eastern Baltic territories. With the decline of Latin, Low German became the dominant language of official documents, commerce, education and government and later on High German. By the first half of the 20th century, the Baltic Germans were, until after World War II, along with the Transylvanian Saxons and the Zipser Germans (in Romania and Slovakia respectively), one of the three oldest continuously German-speaking and ethnic German groups of the German diaspora in Europe.

The majority of medieval Catholic settlers and their German-speaking descendants lived in the local towns of medieval Livonia. However, a small wealthy elite formed the Baltic nobility, acquiring large rural estates. When Sweden had ceded its Livonian territories to the Russian Empire after the Great Northern War (1700–1721), many of these German-speaking aristocrats began taking high positions in the military, political and civilian life of the Russian Empire, particularly in its capital city Saint Petersburg. Most Baltic Germans were citizens of the Russian Empire until Estonia and Latvia achieved independence in 1918. Thereafter, most Baltic Germans held Estonian or Latvian citizenship until their coerced resettlement to Nazi Germany in 1939, prior to the Soviet invasion and occupation of Estonia and Latvia in 1940.

The Baltic German population never surpassed more than 10% of the total population. In 1881, there were 180,000 Baltic Germans in Russia's Baltic provinces; however, by 1914, this number had declined to 162,000. In 1881 there were approximately 46,700 Germans in Estonia (5.3% of the population). According to the Russian Empire Census of 1897, there were 120,191 Germans in Latvia, or 6.2% of the population.

Baltic German presence in the Baltics effectively ended in late 1939, following the signing of the Molotov–Ribbentrop Pact and the subsequent Nazi–Soviet population transfers. Nazi Germany resettled almost all the Baltic Germans under the Heim ins Reich program into the newly formed Reichsgaue of Wartheland and Danzig-West Prussia (on the territory of the occupied Second Polish Republic). In 1945, most ethnic Germans remaining were expelled from these lands as part of the wider expulsion of Germans from Central and Eastern Europe after World War II. Resettlement was planned by the Allies for the territory remaining under Germany according to the terms of the border changes promulgated at the Potsdam Conference, i.e. west of the Oder–Neisse line.

Ethnic Germans from East Prussia and Lithuania are sometimes incorrectly considered Baltic Germans for reasons of cultural, linguistic, and historical affinities. Germans of East Prussia held Prussian, and after 1871, German citizenship, because the territory they lived in was part of the Kingdom of Prussia.

== Ethnic composition ==
Baltic Germans were not a purely German ethnic group. The early crusaders, tradesmen and craftsmen and even nobles often married local women, as there were no German women available. Some noble families, such as the Lievens, claimed descent through such women from native chieftains. Many of the German Livonian-Order soldiers died during the Livonian War of 1558–1583. New German arrivals came to the area. During this time, the Low German (Plattdeutsch) of the original settlers was gradually replaced by the High German (Hochdeutsch) of the new settlers.

In the course of their 700-year history, Baltic German families had ethnic German roots, but also intermarried extensively with Estonians, Livonians and Latvians, as well as with other Northern or Central European peoples, such as Danes, Swedes, Irish, English, Scots, Poles, Hungarians and Dutch. In the early years of the Russian empire, some even married into Russian nobility and society. In cases where any intermarriage occurred, members of the other ethnic groups frequently assimilated into German culture, adopting German language, customs, and family names. They were then considered Germans, leading to the ethnogenesis of the Baltic Germans. The families of Barclay de Tolly and of George Armitstead (1847–1912), who had emigrated from the British Isles, married into and became part of the Baltic-German community.

== Territories ==
Baltic German settlements in the Baltic area consisted of the following territories:

- Estland (Latin: Estonia; Estonian: Eestimaa), roughly the northern half of present-day Estonia; major towns: Reval (Tallinn), Narwa (Narva), Wesenberg (Rakvere), Weissenstein (Paide), Hapsal (Haapsalu).
- Livland (Latin: Livonia; Estonian: Liivimaa; Latvian: Vidzeme), roughly the southern half of present-day Estonia and the northern and eastern part of today's Latvia (Vidzeme); major towns: Riga, Wenden (Cēsis), Wolmar (Valmiera), Walk (Valga and Valka), Dorpat (Tartu), Pernau (Pärnu), Fellin (Viljandi).
- Kurland (Latin: Curonia; also English: Courland; Latvian: Kurzeme), roughly the western half of present-day Latvia (Kurzeme and Zemgale); major towns: Mitau (Jelgava), Windau (Ventspils), Libau (Liepāja).
- Ösel (the island of Saaremaa) belonging to present-day Estonia; major town: Arensburg (Kuressaare).

== History ==
=== Conquering the Baltics ===
Map of Terra Mariana in 1260

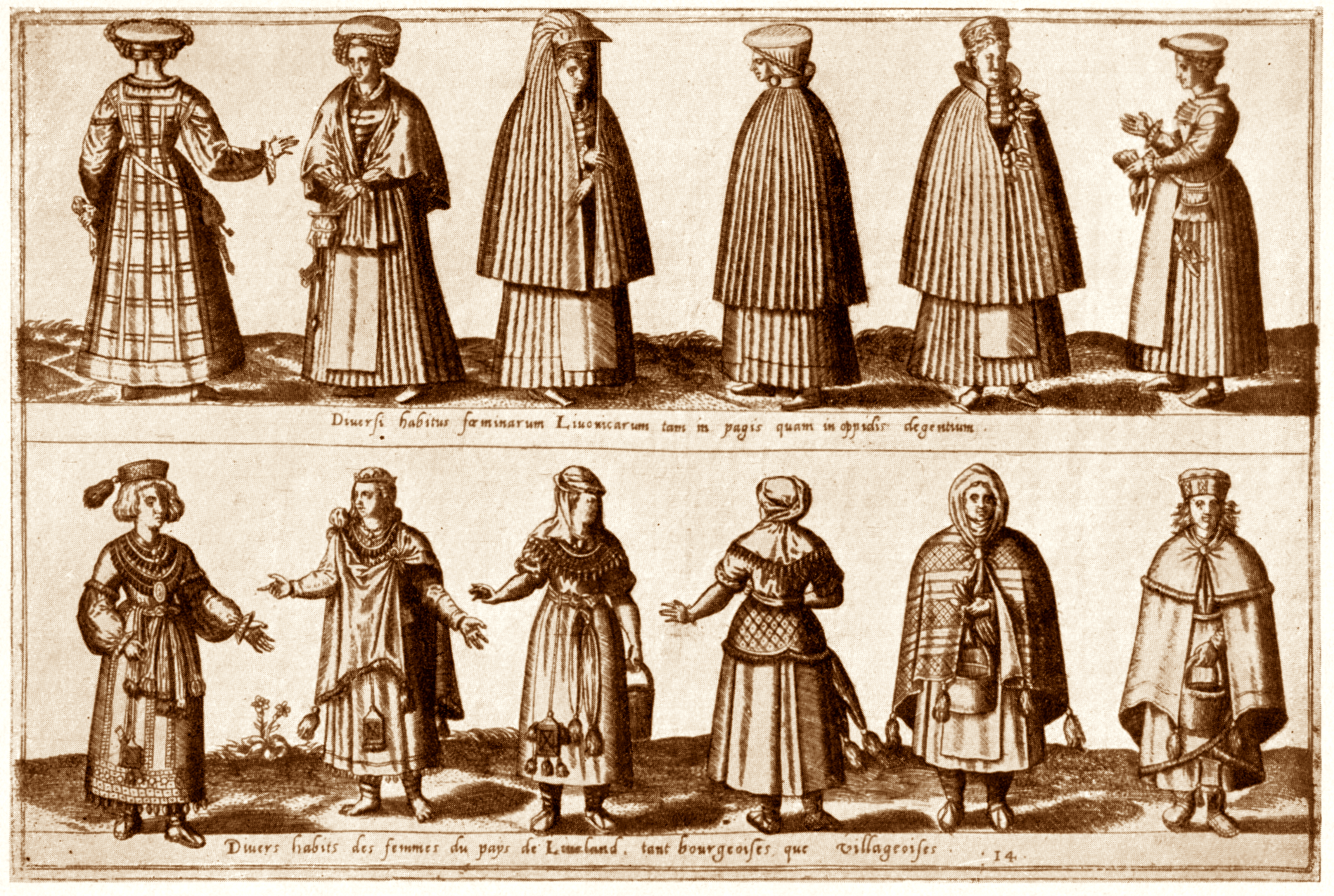
Citizens in 16th century medieval Livonia (upper panel), commoners (lower panel)

Small numbers of ethnic Germans began to settle in the area in the late 12th century, when traders and Christian missionaries began to visit the coastal lands inhabited by tribes who spoke Finnic and Baltic languages. Systematic conquest and settlement of these lands was completed during the Northern Crusades of the 12th and 13th centuries; this resulted in creation of the Terra Mariana confederation, under the protection of Roman Popes and Holy Roman Empire. After the heavy defeat in the 1236 Battle of Saule the Livonian Brothers of the Sword became a part of the Teutonic Order.

During the next three centuries, German-speaking soldiers, clergymen, merchants and craftsmen constituted the majority of the quickly growing urban population, as the native inhabitants usually were prohibited from settling there. In 1230, the Livonian Order invited over 200 German merchants from Gotland to settle in Tallinn where they founded a market town. Membership in the Hanseatic League and active trade links with Russia and Europe increased the wealth of German traders.

=== Polish–Lithuanian and Swedish rule ===
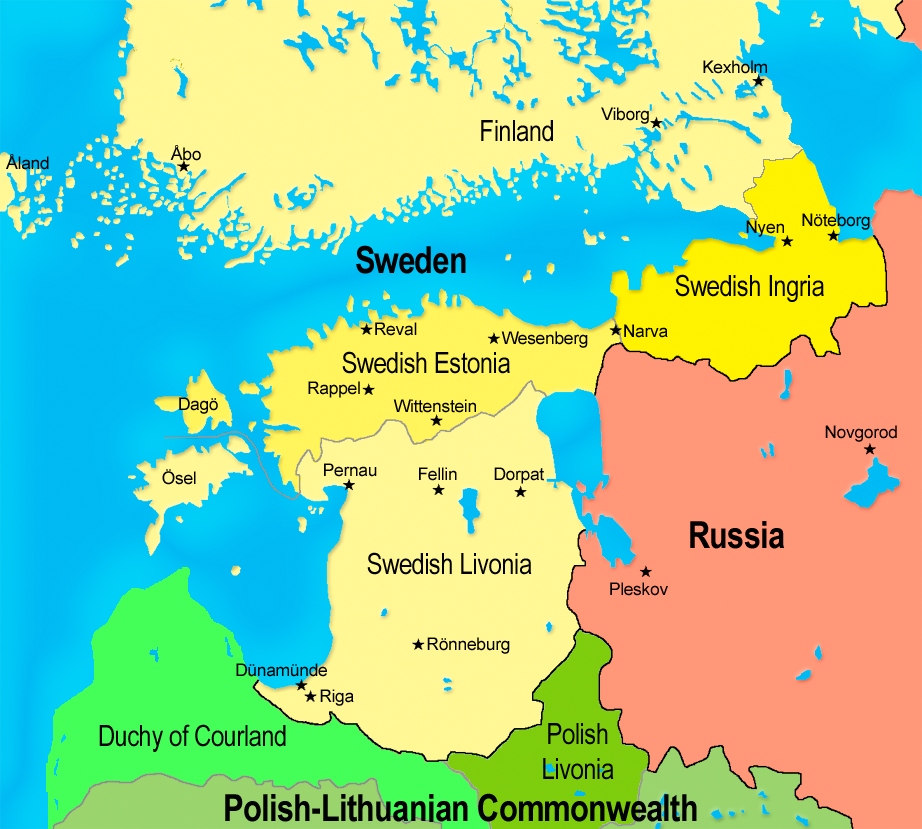
Polish-Lithuanian and Swedish lands in the Baltics

As the military power of the Teutonic Knights weakened during the 15th century wars with the Kingdom of Poland, Grand Duchy of Lithuania and Grand Duchy of Moscow, the Livonian branch in the north began to pursue its own policies. When the Prussian branch of the Order secularized in 1525 and became a Polish vassal state as the Duchy of Prussia, the Livonian branch remained independent while searching for a similar way to secularize. Livonia became mostly Protestant during the Reformation.

In 1558, the Tsardom of Russia began the Livonian War against Terra Mariana which soon involved the Kingdoms of Poland, Sweden, and Denmark and lasted for 20 years. In 1561, Terra Mariana ceased to exist and was divided among Denmark (which took the island of Ösel), Sweden (which took northern Estonia) and Poland, which annexed the newly created Duchy of Livonia, and granted the Duchy of Courland and Semigallia, a vassal state of Poland-Lithuania, to the last Master of the Livonian Order Gotthard Kettler. The secularized land was divided among the remaining knights who formed the basis of Baltic nobility.

The Duchy of Courland and Semigallia existed as a German-speaking country until 1795, while the northern part of Duchy of Livonia was conquered by Sweden which controlled parts of Estonia between 1561 and 1710 and Swedish Livonia between 1621 and 1710, having signed an agreement with the local Baltic German nobles not to undermine their political rights and autonomy.

The Academia Gustaviana (now University of Tartu) was founded in 1632 by King Gustavus Adolphus of Sweden. It remained the only institution of higher education in the former Livonian territories and became the intellectual focus of the Baltic Germans.

At the end of the 17th century, Sweden introduced the land reduction in its Baltic provinces and properties held by German nobility became the property of the Crown. That effectively turned serfs into free peasants. However, it would be overturned when Russia conquered these territories in 1710 and restored the rights of German landowners under the Treaty of Nystad.

=== Russia's Baltic governorates (1710–1917) ===
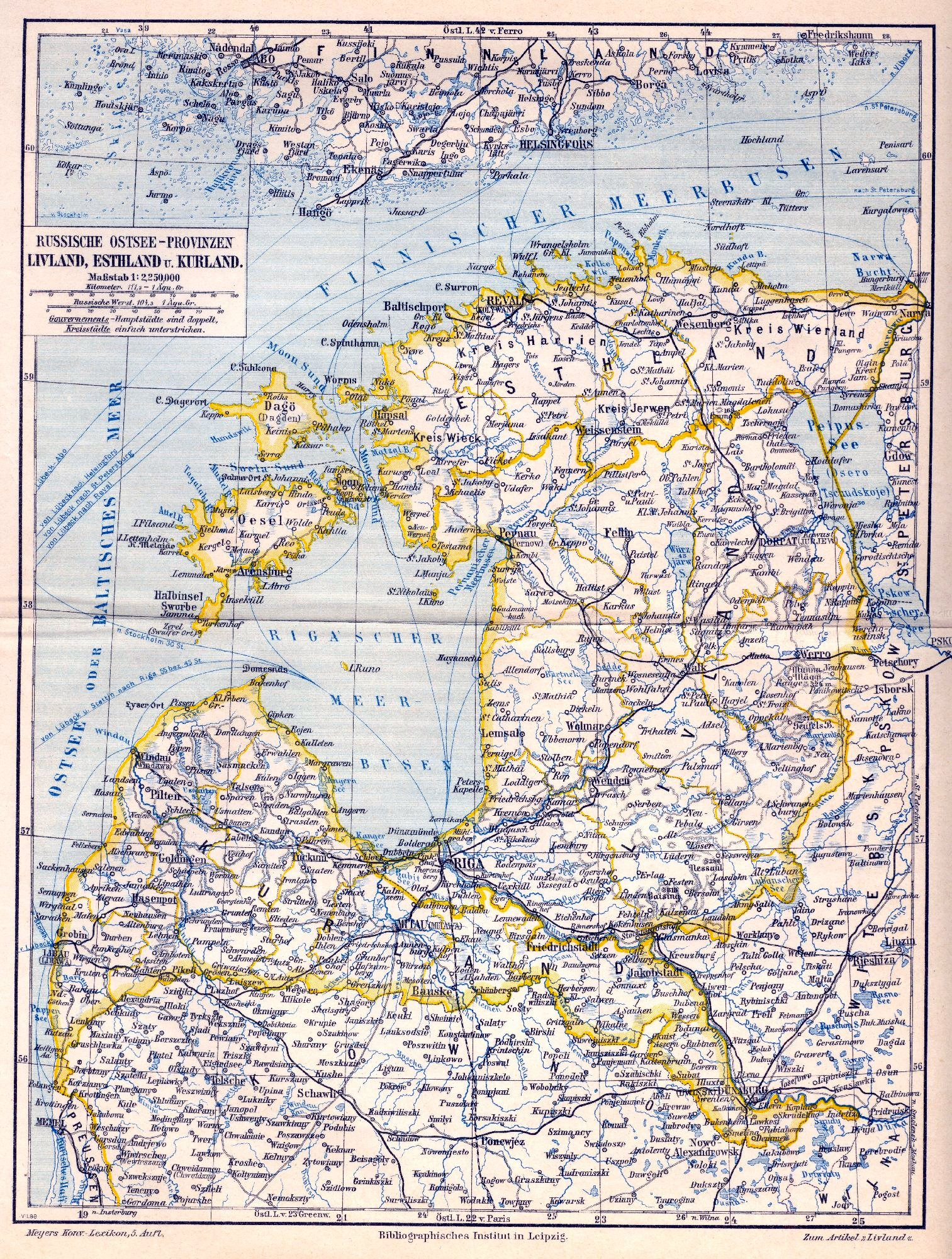
Russian Baltic governorates

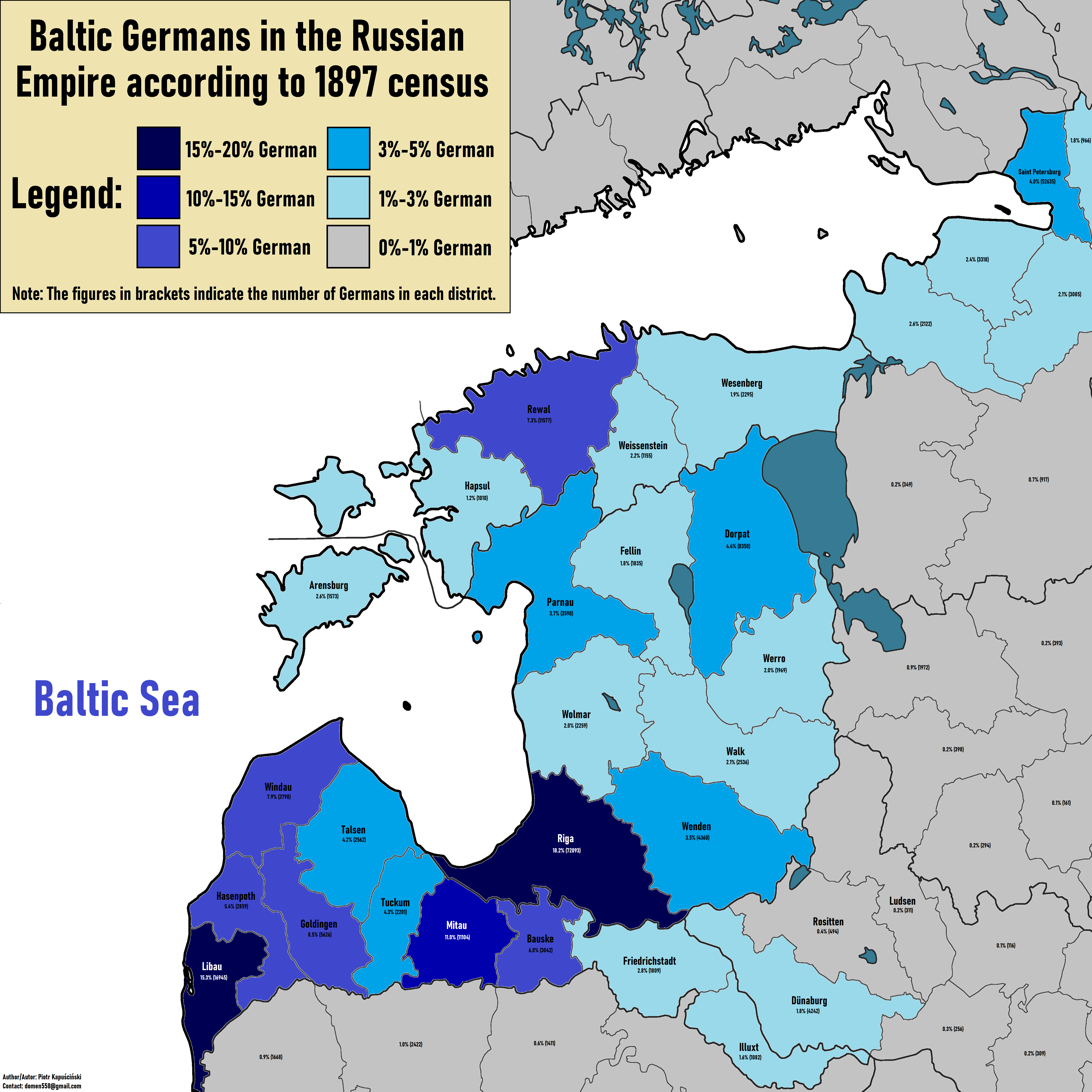
Distribution of Baltic Germans in the Russian Empire in 1897 15% - 20% German 10% - 15% German 5% - 10% German 3% - 5% German 1% - 3% German 0% - 1% German

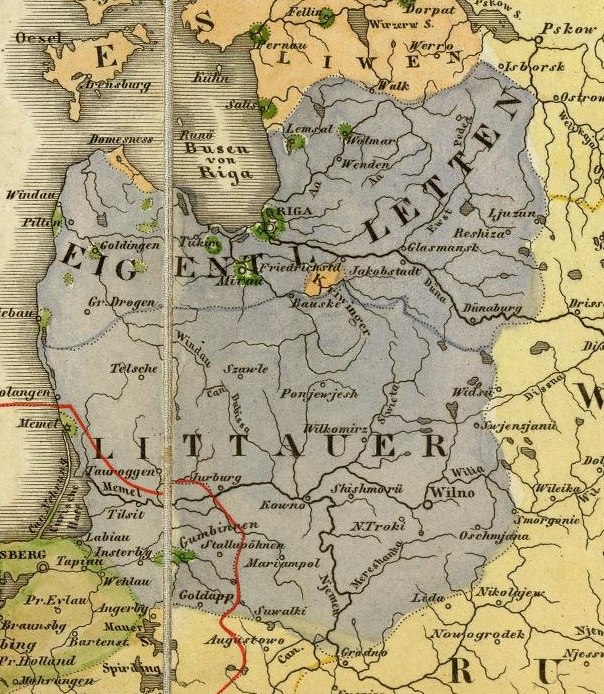
Ethnographic map of Lithuanians (Littauer) and Latvians (Letten) in 1847 by Heinrich Berghaus. The green spots in Memel (Klaipėda), Libau (Liepāja), Windau (Ventspils), Goldingen (Kuldiga), Mitau (Jelgava), Volmar (Valmiera) and Riga show German populations

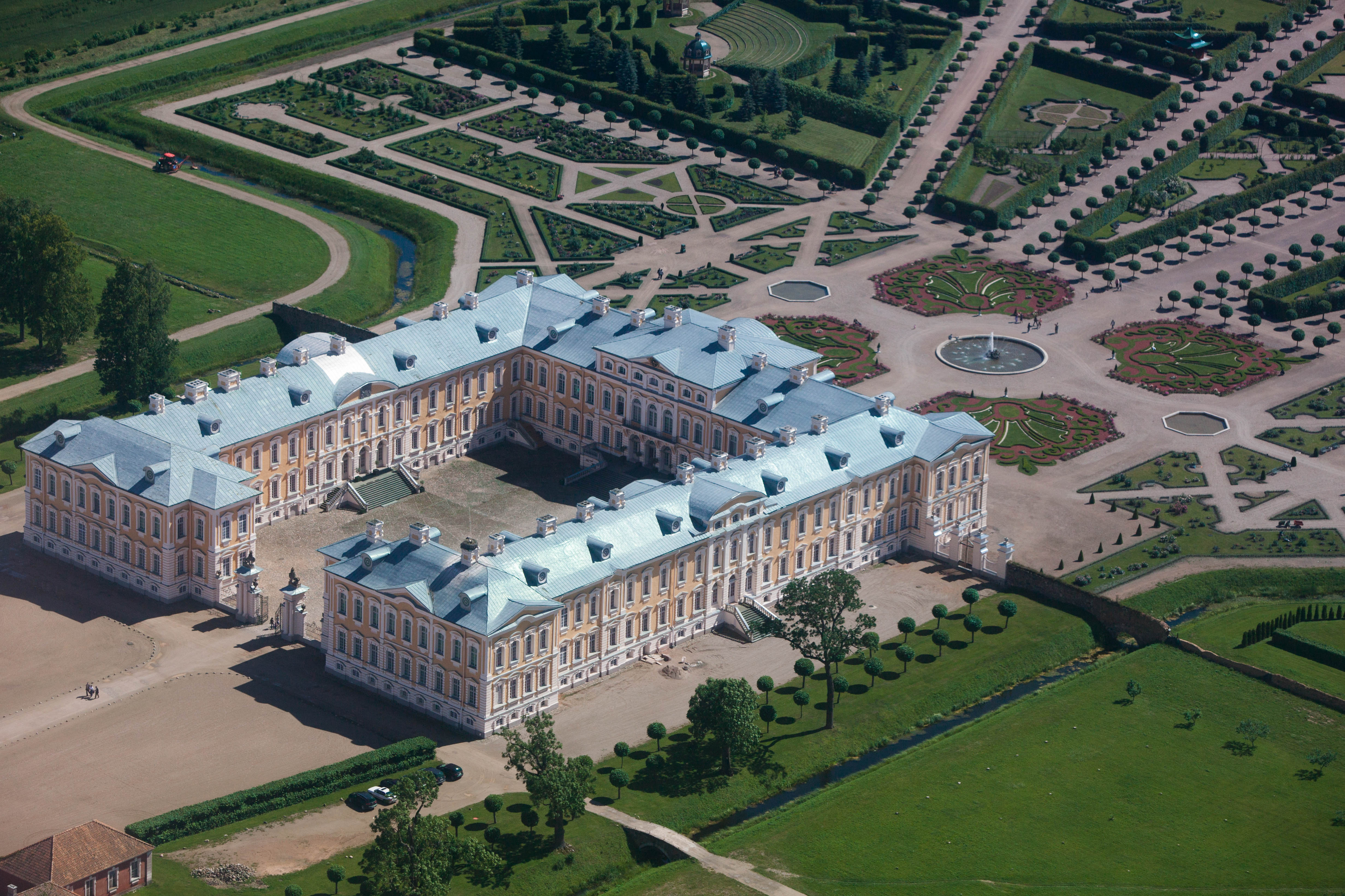
Dukes of Courland's Rundāle Palace

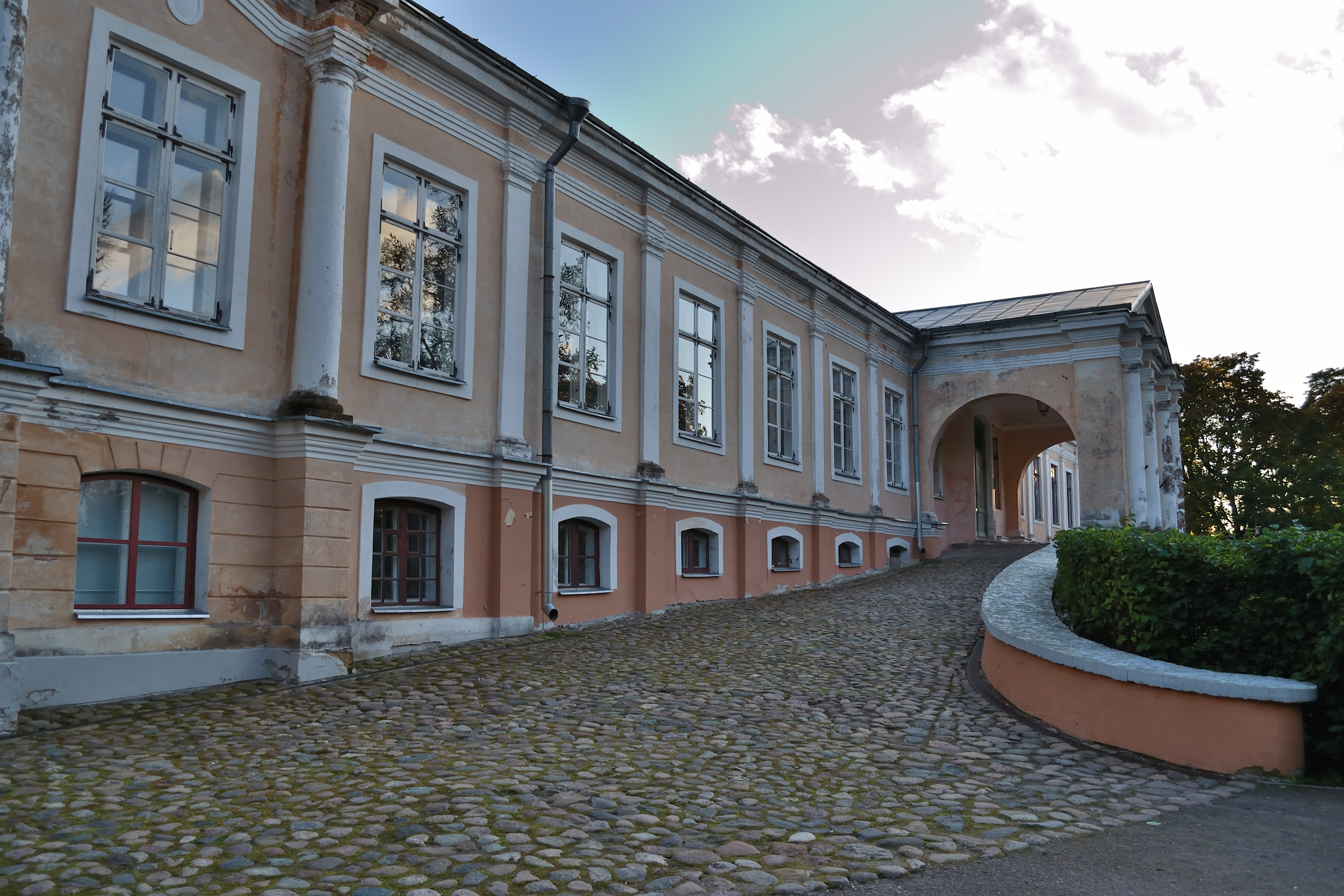
The many manors in Estonia and Latvia testify to the former splendor of the Baltic German landowning class. Pictured, the von Stackelberg family's manor in Vääna, Estonia

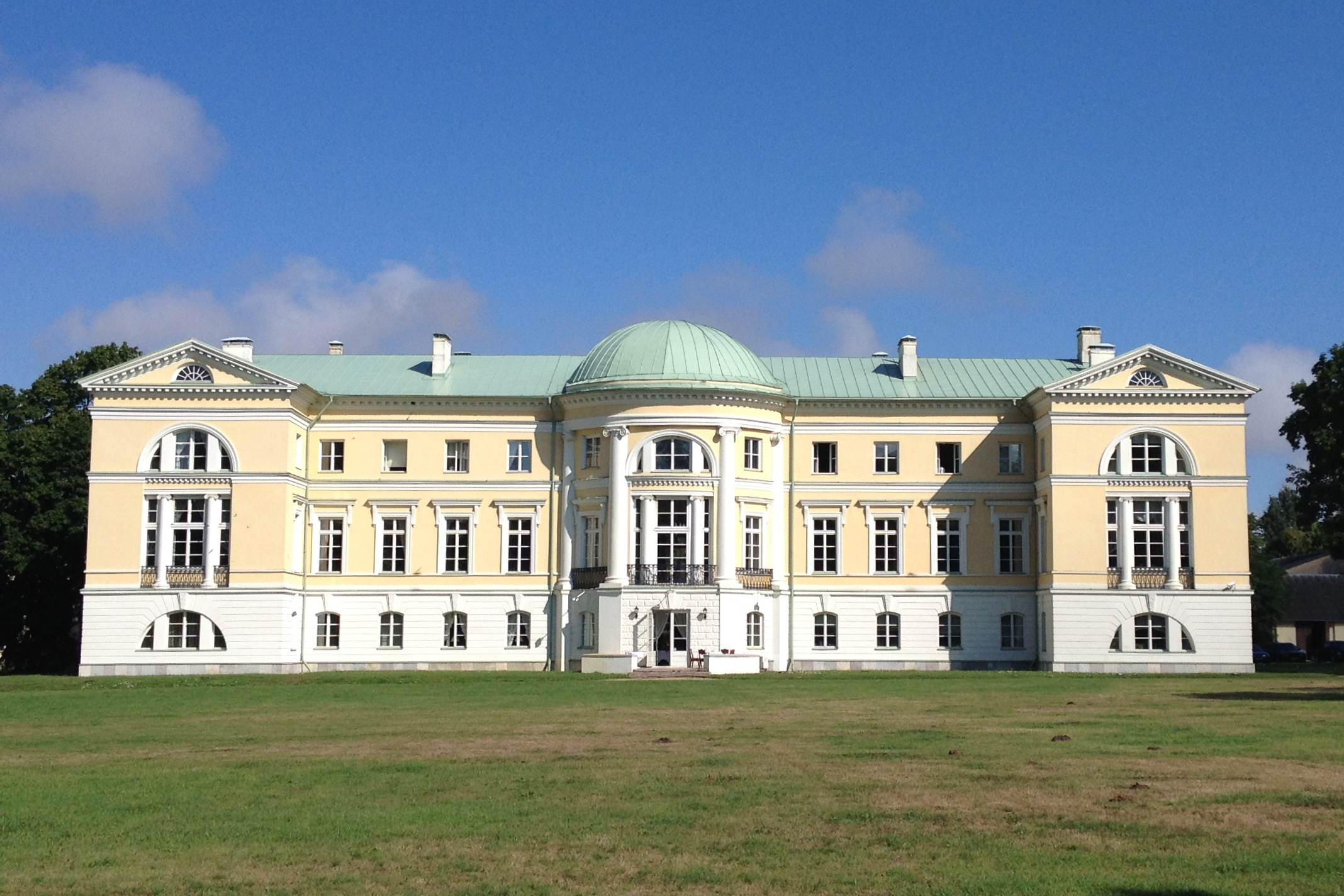
The von Lieven family's Mežotne Palace in Latvia

Between 1710 and 1795, following Russia's success in the Great Northern War and the three Partitions of Poland, the areas inhabited by Baltic Germans eventually became Baltic governorates of the Russian Empire: Courland Governorate, Governorate of Livonia and Governorate of Estonia.

==== Autonomy ====
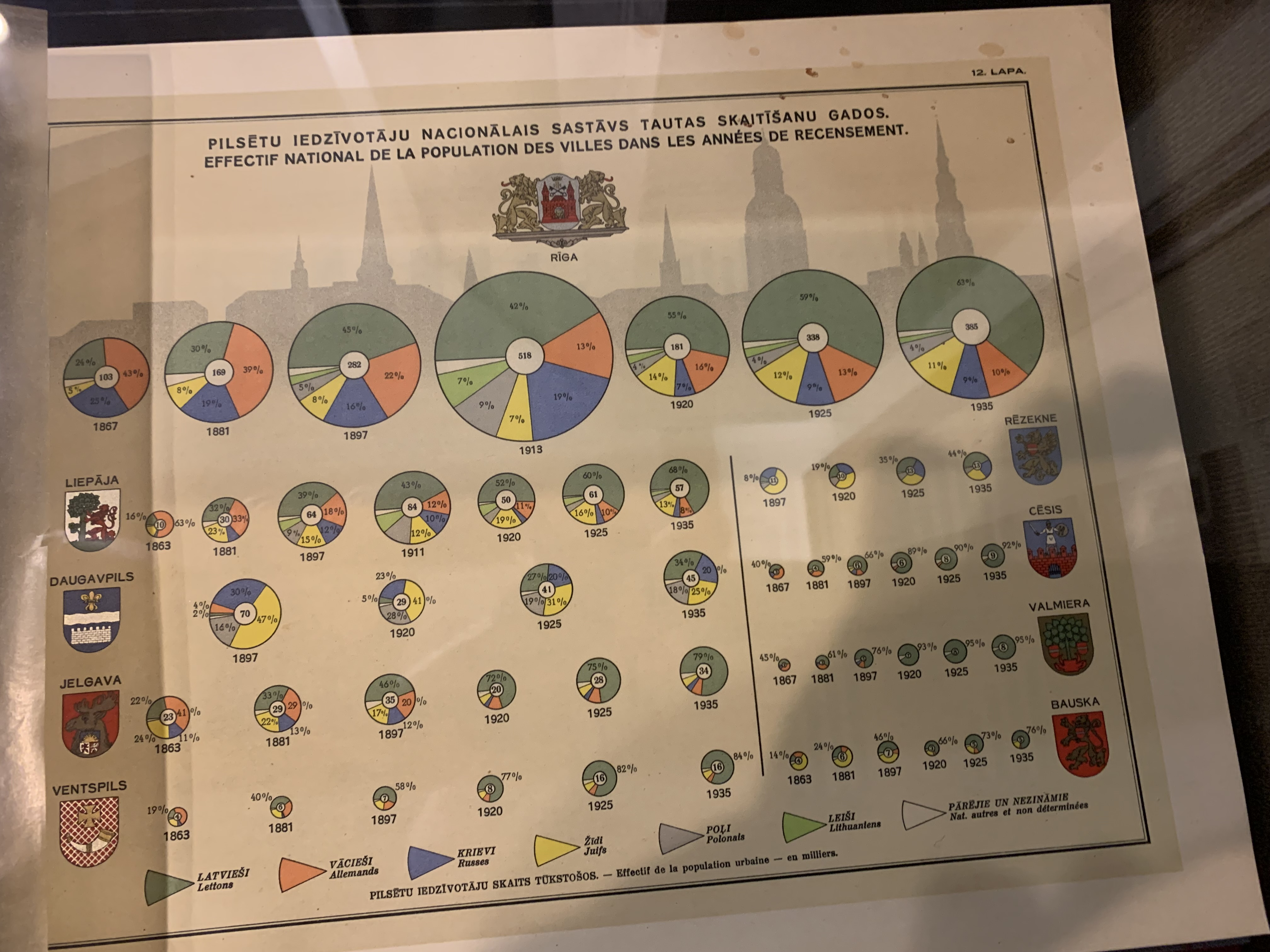
Ethnic Composition Latvia 1863-1935. Up until the end of the 19th century, many now Latvian settlements had dominant German populations.

The Baltic provinces remained autonomous and were self-governed by the local Baltic nobility. Until the imperial reforms of the 1880s, local government was in the hands of the landtag of each province, in which only members of the matriculated Baltic nobility held membership and cities were ruled by German burgomasters.

Between 1710 and approximately 1880, the Baltic German ruling class enjoyed great autonomy from the Imperial government and achieved great political influence in the Imperial court. Starting from the 18th century, the Baltic German nobility also assumed some leading posts in the Russian imperial government.

Germans, other than the local estate-owners, mainly lived in the cities, such as Riga, Reval, Dorpat, Pernau and Mitau. As late as the mid-19th century, the population of many of these cities still had a German majority, with Estonian, Latvian or Jewish minorities. By 1867, Riga's population was 42.9% German. Until the late 19th century, most of the professional and learned classes in the region, the literati, were Germans.

German political and cultural autonomy ceased in the 1880s, when Russification replaced German administration and schooling with the usage of Russian. After 1885 provincial governors usually were Russians.

==== Rise of native peoples ====
Years of peace under Russian rule brought increasing prosperity and many new manor houses were built on country estates, but economic exploitation worsened the situation of the native population. For examples, see List of palaces and manor houses in Latvia and List of palaces and manor houses in Estonia.

The native Latvian and Estonian population enjoyed fewer rights under the Baltic German nobility compared with farmers in Germany or Sweden. In contrast to the Baltic Germans, Estonians and Latvians had restricted civil rights and resided mostly in rural areas as serfs, tradesmen, or as servants in manors and urban homes. They had no rights to leave their masters and no surnames. This was in keeping with the social scheme of things in Russian Empire. It lasted until the 19th century, when emancipation from serfdom brought those inhabitants increased civil freedoms and some political rights.

In 1804, Livonian peasant law was introduced by the Imperial government, aimed at improving conditions for serfs. Serfdom was abolished in all Baltic provinces between 1816 and 1820, about half a century earlier than in Russia proper. For some time, there was no outward tension between the German speakers and indigenous residents.

Earlier, if any Latvian or Estonian who managed to rise above his class was expected to Germanize and to forget his roots, by the mid-19th century German urban classes began to feel increasing competition from the natives, who after the First Latvian National Awakening and Estonian national awakening produced their own middle class and moved to German- and Jewish-dominated towns and cities in increasing numbers.

The Revolution of 1905 led to attacks against the Baltic German landowners, the burning of manors, and the torture and even killing of members of the nobility. During the 1905 Revolution groups of rebels burned over 400 manor houses and German-owned buildings and killed 82 Germans. In response Cossack punitive expeditions aided by German nobles and officers burned down hundreds of farms, arrested and deported thousands and summarily executed at least 2,000 people.

Reaction to 1905 Revolution included a scheme by Karl Baron von Manteuffel-Szoege and Silvio Broedrich-Kurmahlen to pacify the countryside by settling up to 20,000 ethnic German farmers, mostly from Volhynia, in Courland.

=== World War I ===
World War I brought the end of the alliance of the Baltic Germans and the Russian Tsarist government. German heritage led to their being viewed as the enemy by Russians. They were also seen as traitors by the German Empire if they remained loyal to Russia. Their loyalty to the state was questioned, and rumours of a German fifth column increased with the defeats of the Imperial army led by Baltic German general Paul von Rennenkampf. All German schools and societies were closed in the Estonian Governorate and Germans were ordered to leave the Courland Governorate for inner Russia.

Courland was conquered by Germany in 1915 and included into the military Ober Ost administration. After the Russian surrender at the Treaty of Brest-Litovsk in 1918, the German Empire occupied the remaining Baltic provinces.

The Ober Ost military administration began plans for German colonization of Courland. On April 20, 1917, the Commander-in-Chief of the Eastern front announced that a third of arable land there should be reserved for settlement by German war veterans. This was approved by Courland's German nobility on September 22, 1917.

==== United Baltic Duchy ====
Livonian and Estonian nobles delivered a note of independence to Soviet representatives in Stockholm on January 28, 1918, announcing their intention to break away from Russia under the rights granted to them by the Treaty of Nystad of 1721. In response, the Bolsheviks, who controlled Estonia, arrested 567 leading Germans and deported them to Russia. After the signing of the Treaty of Brest-Litovsk they were allowed to return. Under the peace treaty, Germany gained control over Courland, Riga, Saaremaa (Ösel), Livonia and Estonia.

In the spring of 1918, Baltic Germans announced the restoration of the independent Duchy of Courland and Semigallia and pursued plans for uniting it with the Kingdom of Prussia. On April 12, 1918, Baltic German representatives from all Baltic provinces met in Riga and called on the German Emperor to annex the Baltic lands.

Subsequently, a plan for a United Baltic Duchy ruled by Duke Adolf Friedrich of Mecklenburg, instead of outright annexation, was developed. Its regency council met on November 9, 1918, but collapsed with the German Empire.

=== Independent Baltic states ===
The Baltic Germans' rule and class privileges came to the end with the demise of the Russian Empire (due to the Bolshevik revolution of October 1917) and the independence of Estonia and Latvia in 1918–1919.

Baltic Germans suffered greatly under Bolshevik regimes in Estonia and Latvia. While the Bolshevik regimes were short-lived, they pursued the Red Terror against Germans, often killing them purely because of their nationality.

After the collapse of the German Empire, Baltic Germans in Estonia began forming volunteer units to defend against the Bolshevik threat. On November 27, 1918 this was authorized by the Estonian government, and the Volunteer Baltic Battalion (Freiwilligen Baltenbataillon) was formed under the command of Colonel Constantin von Weiss (de).

During the Estonian and Latvian wars of independence from 1918 to 1920, many Baltic Germans voluntarily enlisted in the newly formed Estonian and Latvian armies to help secure the independence of these countries from Russia. These Baltic German military units became known as the Baltische Landeswehr in Latvia and Baltenregiment (de) in Estonia. The State archives of Estonia and Latvia keep individual military records of each person who fought in this war.

Baltische Landeswehr units took Riga on May 22, 1919 which was followed by White Terror in which up to 2,000 people, mostly Latvians, were shot as suspected Bolshevik supporters.

Baltic German outlying estates were frequent targets of local Bolsheviks (as portrayed in the film, Coup de Grâce) and the combination of local Bolsheviks and nationalists following independence brought about land nationalisations and a displacement of Baltic Germans from positions of authority. Baltic Germans of the Livonian Governorate found themselves in two new countries, both of which introduced sweeping agrarian reforms aimed at the large land owners, an absolute majority of whom were Germans.

As a result of the Russian Revolution of 1917 and the subsequent Russian Civil War, many Baltic Germans fled to Germany. After 1919, many Baltic Germans felt obliged to depart the newly independent states for Germany, but many stayed as ordinary citizens.

In 1925, there were 70,964 Germans in Latvia (3.6%) and 62,144 in 1935 (3.2% of population). Riga remained by far the largest German center with 38,523 Germans residing there in 1935, while Tallinn then had 6,575 Germans.

While the German landed class soon lost most of their lands after the agrarian reforms, they continued to work in their professions and to lead their companies. German cultural autonomy was respected. The Committee of the German Baltic Parties in Latvia and Deutsch-baltische Partei in Estland in Estonia participated in elections and won seats.

At the same time, as both young states built their institutions, this often reduced the status of their minorities. In Latvia, children of mixed marriages were registered as Latvians while in Estonia they took the nationality of their fathers, who increasingly were Estonians. This quickly reduced the number of German children. German place names were eliminated from public use. German congregations lost their churches. Tallinn Cathedral was given to an Estonian congregation in 1927. After the 1923 referendum St. James's Cathedral in Riga was lost and Riga Cathedral taken away after another referendum in 1931.

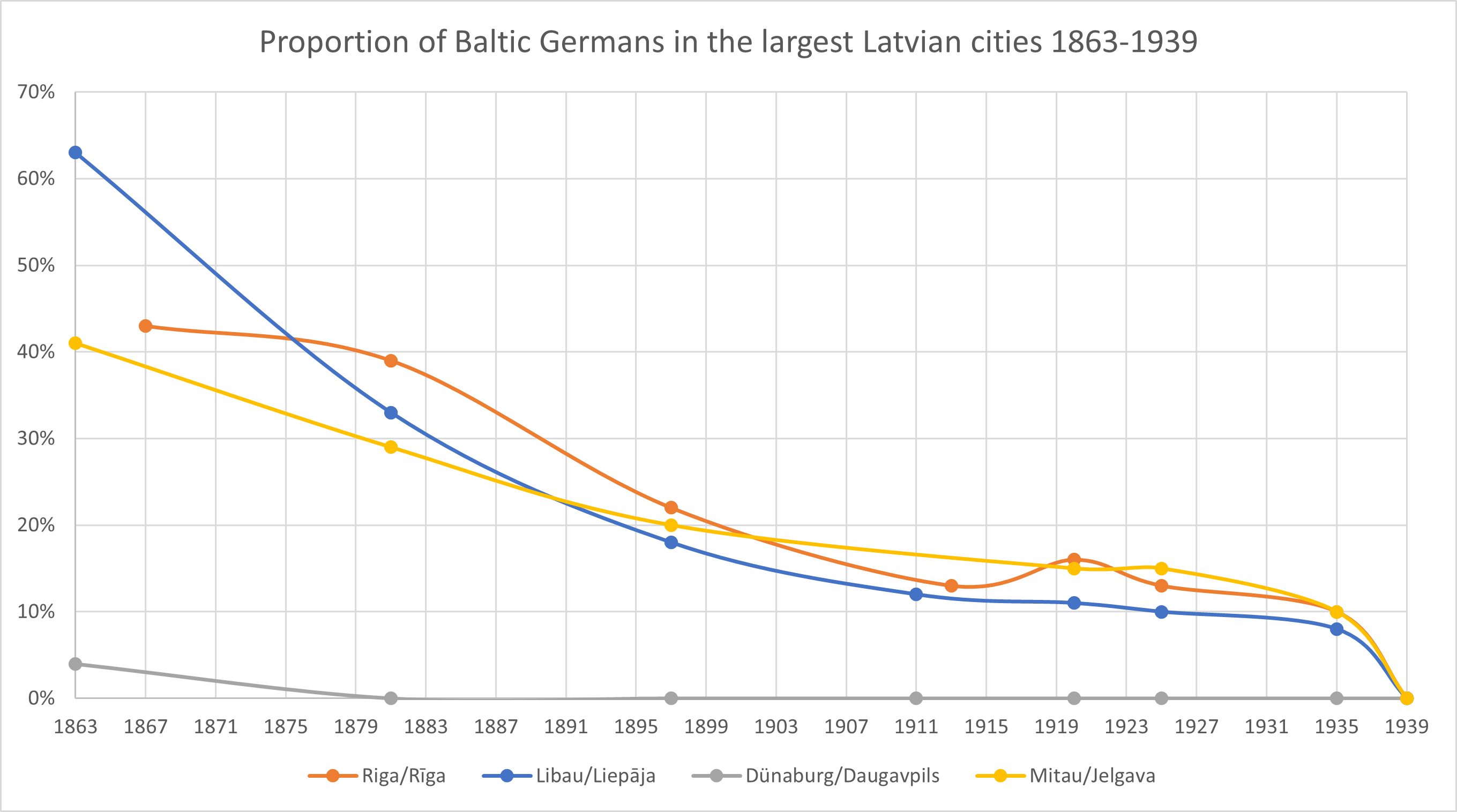
Decrease in the proportion of Baltic Germans in the largest Latvian cities

==== Agrarian reforms ====
At the start of independence, Baltic Germans owned 58% of land in Estonia and 48% in Latvia. Radical agrarian reforms were implemented in both countries to break German power and to distribute land to the veterans of independence wars and landless peasants. This largely destroyed the landed class of German noble families and their economic base.

On October 10, 1919, the Estonian parliament expropriated 1,065 estates (96.6% of all estates). The law of March 1, 1926 set the compensation to the former owners of arable land at about 3% of its market value and no compensation at all for the forests. This almost instantly bankrupted the German noble class, even if they were allowed to keep some 50 hectares of their lands.

On September 16, 1920, the Constitutional Assembly of Latvia nationalized 1,300 estates comprising 3.7 million hectares of land. Former German owners were allowed to keep 50 hectares of land and farm equipment. In 1924, the Saeima decided that no compensation would be paid to former owners. In 1929, the Saeima voted that veterans of the Baltische Landeswehr could not receive any land.

==== Estonia ====
In Estonia, there was only one German party, which from 1926 was led by Axel de Vries (de), editor of Revaler Bote. Their leading parliamentarian was Werner Hasselblatt (1890–1958). Germans never received ministerial posts in governments. The three largest minorities – Germans, Swedes and Russians – sometimes formed election coalitions. The Deutsch-baltische Partei in Estland was established to defend the interests of German landowners, who wanted to receive compensation for their nationalized lands and properties. After land nationalization they received no compensation, but could keep plots up to 50 hectares, which was not enough to support their manor houses.

Germans were banned from governmental and military positions. Many Germans sold their properties and emigrated to Scandinavia or Western Europe. Most of the grand manor houses were taken over by schools, hospitals, local administration and museums.

Estonia's Baltic German population was smaller than Latvia's, so as Estonians continued to fill professional positions such as law and medicine, there was less of a leadership role for the Baltic Germans. Baron Wilhelm Wrangell, leader of the Baltic German cultural association between 1933 and 1938 was included in the Estonian Council of State after 1937 as a token representative of minorities. The last leader of Baltic German Cultural administration was Hellmuth Weiss.

On February 12, 1925, Estonia adopted the Cultural Autonomy and National Minorities Act, which provided for some cultural autonomy of Germans. Despite this, the German community in Estonia continued to decline as the majority of young people chose to emigrate. By 1934, there were 16,346 Baltic Germans in Estonia, 1.5% of the total population.

Estonia allowed German schools to teach in the German language. These schools were overseen by the Gesellschaft Deutsche Schulhilfe, which was part of the Union of German Societies in Estonia. After adoption of the Minority law of February 5, 1925 the Baltic German Cultural Council was created on November 1, 1925. In 1928, German schools were attended by 3,456 pupils.

==== Latvia ====
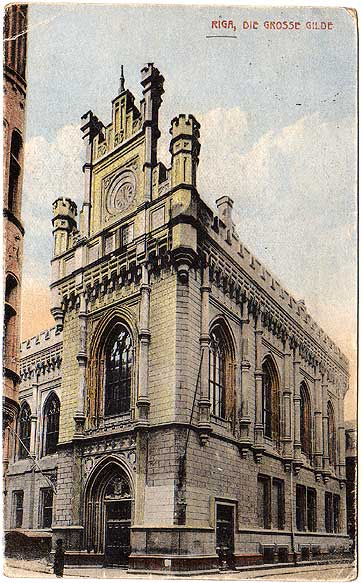
Building of the Large Guild in Riga, 1918

In Latvia, Baltic Germans remained a politically active and organized ethnic group, although they lost some influence after the 1934 Latvian coup d'état. A couple of times Germans received ministerial posts in coalition governments. The commander of Latvia's Navy between 1919 and 1931 was Admiral Archibald Count of Keyserlingk.

Six, later seven, German parties existed and formed a coalition in the Saeima. The leading politicians were Baron Wilhelm Friedrich Karl von Fircks, leader of the Baltic-German People's Party and Paul Schiemann, editor-in-chief of the Rigasche Rundschau newspaper and leader of the Baltic-German Democratic Party. Increased activity of National Socialist supporters in the German community led to the resignation of Schiemann from the Rigasche Rundschau in 1933.

Minority cultural affairs were overseen by the Ministry of Culture and the German section was led by pastor Karl Keller (1868–1939) and later by Wolfgang Wachtsmuth. In 1923, there were 12,168 pupils in German schools. The Herder Institute, a private German university with three faculties (Theology, Jurisprudence and Political Science and Philosophy) was established.

In 1926, the German community introduced voluntary self-taxation, asking all Germans to contribute up to 3% of their monthly income to community activities. In 1928, the Baltic German National Community was established as the central representative body of Baltic Germans in Latvia.

The educational autonomy of Germans was severely limited in 1931–1933, when the Minister of Education Atis Ķeniņš introduced a policy of latvianization in minority schools. On July 18, 1934 the autonomous German schools were brought under complete control of the Ministry of Education.

After the coup of May 15, 1934, all associations and independent business organizations had to shut down. This affected the German community especially hard, as they lost their ancient communal centers – guilds, and all of their property was nationalized. A wave of takeovers of Jewish, Russian and German businesses then followed; banks, factories and trading companies were purchased by state-owned banks at set rates in order to reduce minority control over businesses.

=== Resettlement of all Baltic Germans (1939–1944) ===
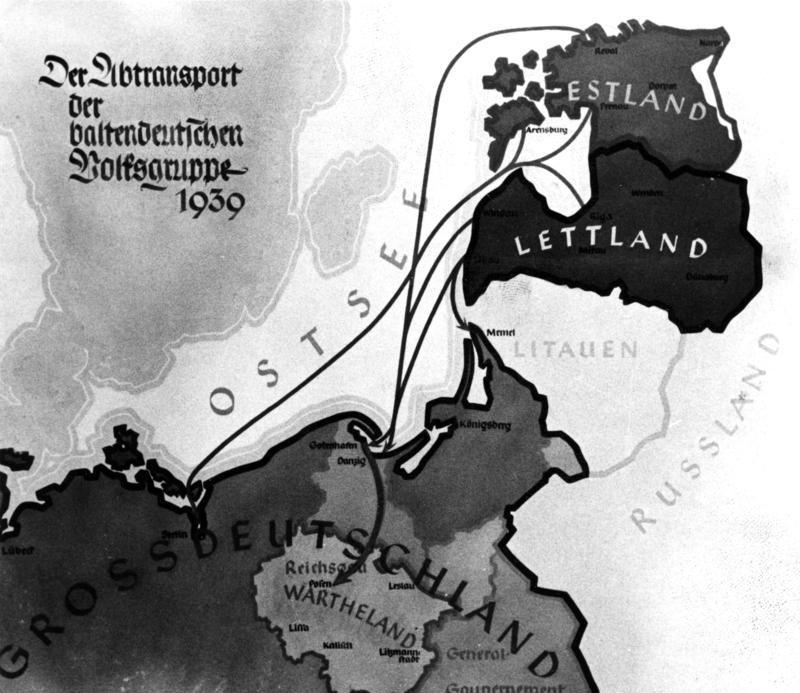
Nazi plans to "resettle" Baltic Germans in "Warthegau"

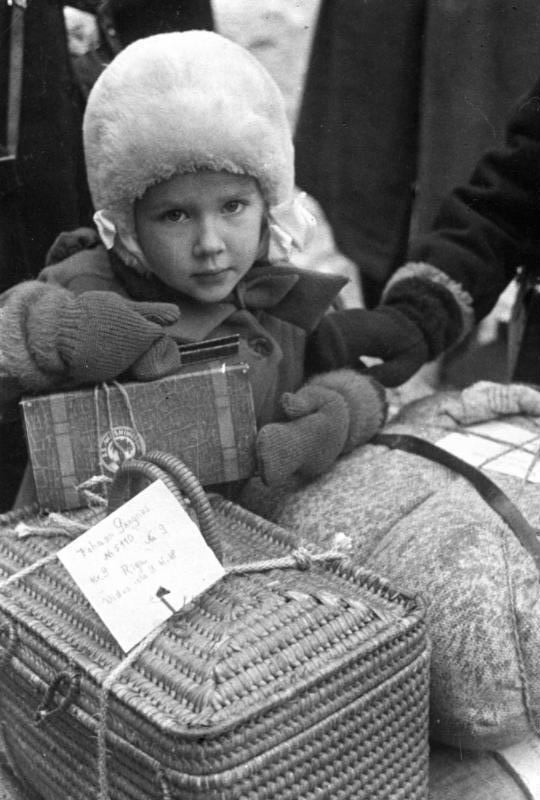
At the port

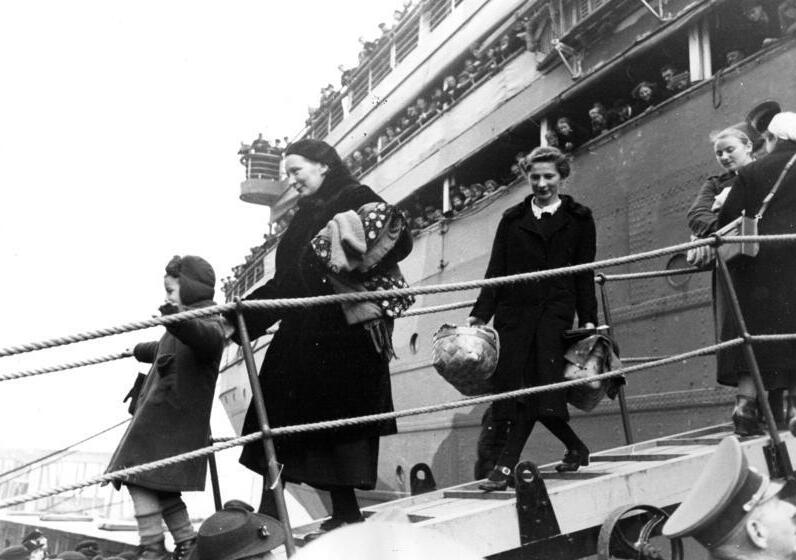
Baltic German resettlers disembark at the port of Stettin from the ship General Steuben.

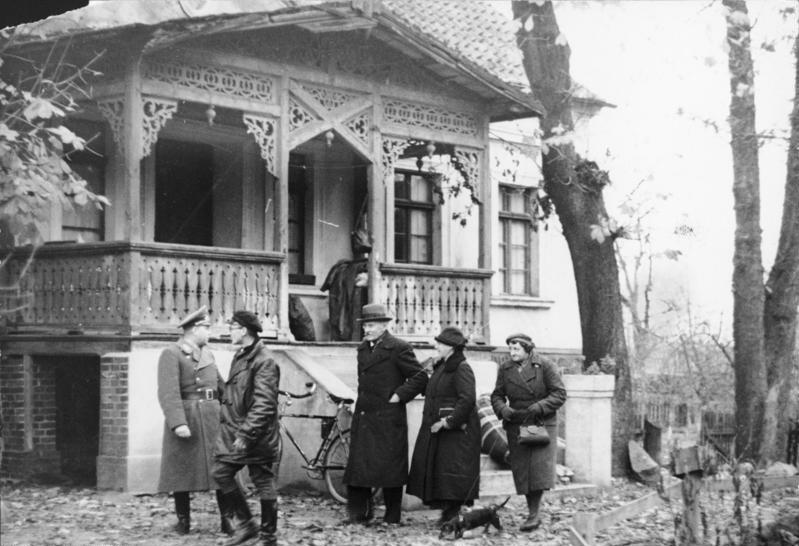
Resettled Baltic Germans make a new home in what had been the home of previously expelled Poles in "Warthegau".

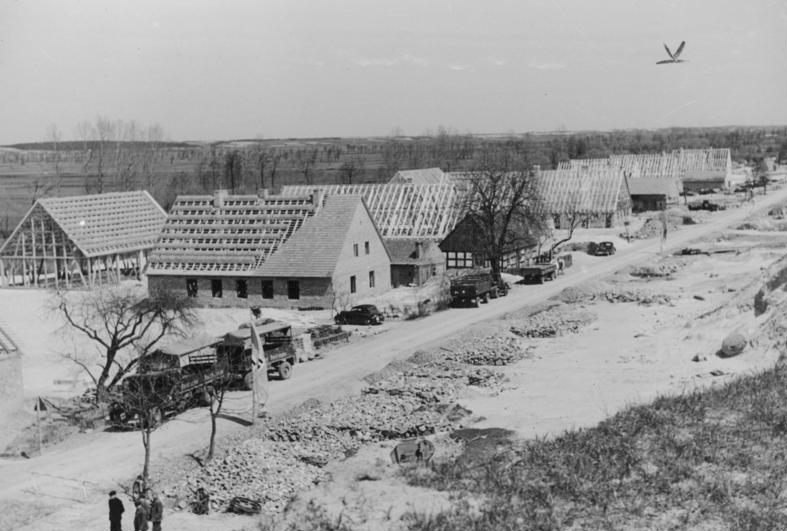
Newly built village in Reichsgau Wartheland

==== 1939–1940 ====
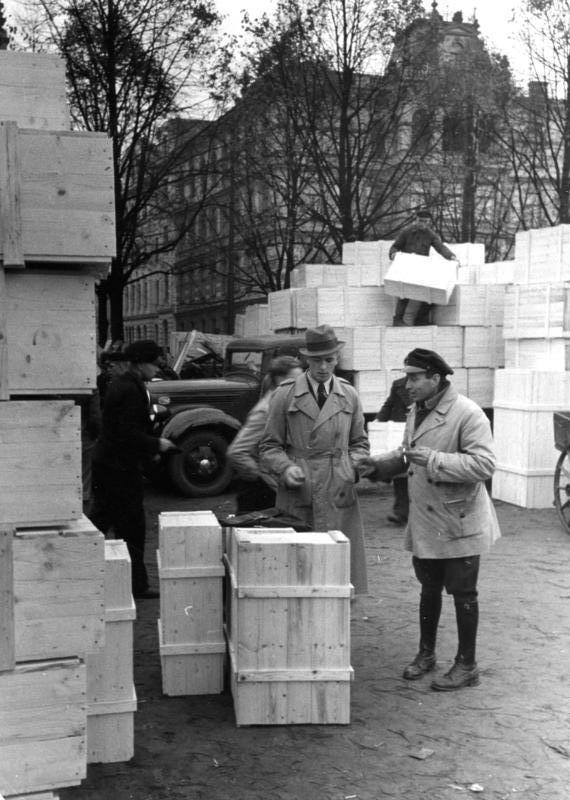
Boxed goods of departing Germans, Riga, 1939

As a result of the secret protocols of the Molotov–Ribbentrop Pact in 1939, Estonia and Latvia were assigned to the "Soviet sphere of influence". One of the main conditions imposed by Hitler on Stalin in August 1939 was the prior transfer of all ethnic Germans living in Estonia and Latvia to areas under German military control. These became known as the Nazi–Soviet population transfers. Stalin proceeded to set up Soviet military bases in Estonia and Latvia in late 1939.

In a speech to the Reichstag on October 6, 1939, which was broadcast live on radio, Hitler announced that German minorities should be resettled in the Reich (Back home to the Reich, Heim ins Reich). Resettlement was overseen by Himmler who created a new Reich Commisariat for the Strengthening of Germandom for this purpose.

Treaties were signed with Estonia and Latvia in 1939 and 1940 concerning the emigration of Baltic Germans and the liquidation of their educational, cultural, and religious institutions. Nazi Germany succeeded in getting the Baltic Germans to abandon their homes and homeland in haste. Due to the imposition of wartime rationing, Germans were banned from taking along any valuables, objects of historic value, fuels and even food. A massive sell-off of household items and small businesses followed. Larger properties, real estate and businesses were sold over a longer period of time by a special German commission to local governments.

- Some 13,700 Baltic Germans were resettled from Estonia by early 1940.
- Around 51,000 Baltic Germans were resettled from Latvia by early 1940.

The Estonian and Latvian governments published books containing alphabetical lists of the names of resettled Baltic German adults together with their birthdate, birthplace and last address in the Baltics.

Baltic Germans left by ships from the port cities of Estonia and Latvia to the ports of Gdynia and Szczecin and then were transported to Poznań and Łódź in Reichsgau Wartheland (sometimes called Warthegau) and other Polish areas annexed by Nazi Germany. The "new" homes and farms they were given to live in had been owned and inhabited by Poles and Jews just a few months earlier who were executed or deported eastwards when Nazi Germany invaded Poland. The new arrivals fulfilled Nazi plans for the ethnic Germanization of these lands.

==== Spring 1941 resettlement ====
In early 1941, the Nazi German government arranged another resettlement for all those who had refused to leave in 1939 or 1940. The action was called the Nachumsiedlung. This time around no compensation was offered for any property or belongings left behind and this group of resettlers were treated with intense suspicion or considered traitors because they had refused Hitler's first call to leave the Baltics in 1939. Most of these arrivals were first settled in filtration camps. Unknown to the general public, the Nazi invasion of the Soviet Union was only two to four months away, and this was Hitler's last chance to transfer these people in peacetime conditions.

By this time, the remaining Baltic Germans in Estonia and Latvia found themselves in a vastly different situation than in 1939. Their countries were now occupied by the Soviet Union, and intense pressure and intimidation had been put on anyone with a position of privilege or wealth before 1939. Mass arrests and some killings had taken place. Fearing a worsening of the situation, the vast majority of the remaining Baltic Germans decided to leave. About 7,000 resettled from Estonia by late March 1941, and approximately 10,500 resettled from Latvia by late March 1941. Even though the German government had planned a relocation that would be limited to ethnic Germans only, ultimately a considerable share of resettlers were non-Germans of various ethnicities (mostly Estonians and Latvians, but also individuals of Slavic ethnicity), who used this as the only legal route to escape the Soviet regime.

No books were published listing those who resettled in 1941; however, the present-day archives of Estonia and Latvia still have the lists of all those who left in this year.

==== 1941–1944 ====
A very small minority of Baltic Germans refused again to be resettled and remained in the Baltics past March 1941. Some fell victim to the Soviet deportations to Siberian gulags beginning in early June 1941. The names and data of those deported from Estonia from 1941 to 1953 have been published in books. Details are kept at the Museum of Occupations in Estonia.

After the Nazi attack on the Soviet Union and the conquest of Latvia and Estonia, a small number of Baltic Germans were allowed to return in order to serve as translators, but requests of many resettled Germans to be allowed to return to their homelands were denied by Himmler's SS. Many German Baltic men were mobilized in the occupied Warthegau and served in the German army.

The resettled Germans fled west with the retreating German army in 1944. No precise numbers or lists are available for them. However, several thousand Baltic Germans remained in the Baltics after 1944, but they were subject to widespread discrimination (and possible deportation to Siberia until 1953) by the Soviet authorities ruling Estonia and Latvia. As a result of this, many hid or lied about their Baltic German origins. Most of those who stayed after 1944 were children of mixed ethnic marriages or themselves married to ethnic Estonians, Latvians or Russians and their descendants no longer consider themselves German.

==== "Second resettlement" 1945 ====
The Soviet Union's advance into Poland and Germany in late 1944 and early 1945 resulted in the Baltic Germans being evacuated by the German authorities (or simply fleeing) from their "new homes" to areas even further in the west to escape the advancing Red Army. Most of them settled in West Germany, with some ending up in East Germany.

In stark contrast to the resettlements in 1939–1941, this time the evacuation in most of the areas was delayed until the last moment, when it was too late to conduct it in an orderly fashion, and practically all of them had to leave most of their belongings behind. Seeing as they had been living in these "new" homes only for about five years, this was almost seen as a second forced resettlement for them, albeit under different circumstances.

Many Baltic Germans were on board the KdF Ship Wilhelm Gustloff when it was sunk by a Soviet submarine on January 30, 1945. By one estimate, about 9,400 people on board died, which would make it the largest loss of life in a single ship sinking in history. Additionally, many Baltic Germans died during the sinking of the SS General von Steuben on February 10, 1945.

Two books listing the names and personal data of all Baltic Germans who died as a result of the resettlements and wartime conditions between 1939 and 1947 have been published by the Baltic German genealogical society: Deutsch-baltisches Gedenkbuch. Unsere Toten der Jahre 1939–1947 by Karin von Borbély, Darmstadt, 1991; and Nachtrag zum Deutsch-baltisches Gedenkbuch by Karin von Borbély, Darmstadt, 1995.

With Estonia and Latvia falling under Soviet rule after 1944, most Baltic Germans did not return to the Soviet-occupied Baltics.

==== Canada ====
Many thousands of Baltic Germans emigrated to Canada starting in 1948 with the support of Canadian Governor General The Earl Alexander of Tunis, who had known many Baltic Germans when he had commanded the Baltic German Landeswehr for a short time in 1919. Initially, only 12 Germans were allowed to settle in 1948. Based on the good behavior of this group, many thousands of Baltic Germans were soon allowed to immigrate during the following years.

A small group of Latvians and Baltic Germans emigrated to Newfoundland as part of then Premier Joseph Smallwood's New Industries Program. Several families in Corner Brook built, operated and worked in the cement and gypsum plants that provided essential material for the creation of Newfoundland's infrastructure after Confederation.

=== Destruction of cultural heritage in the Soviet Baltics (1945–1989) ===
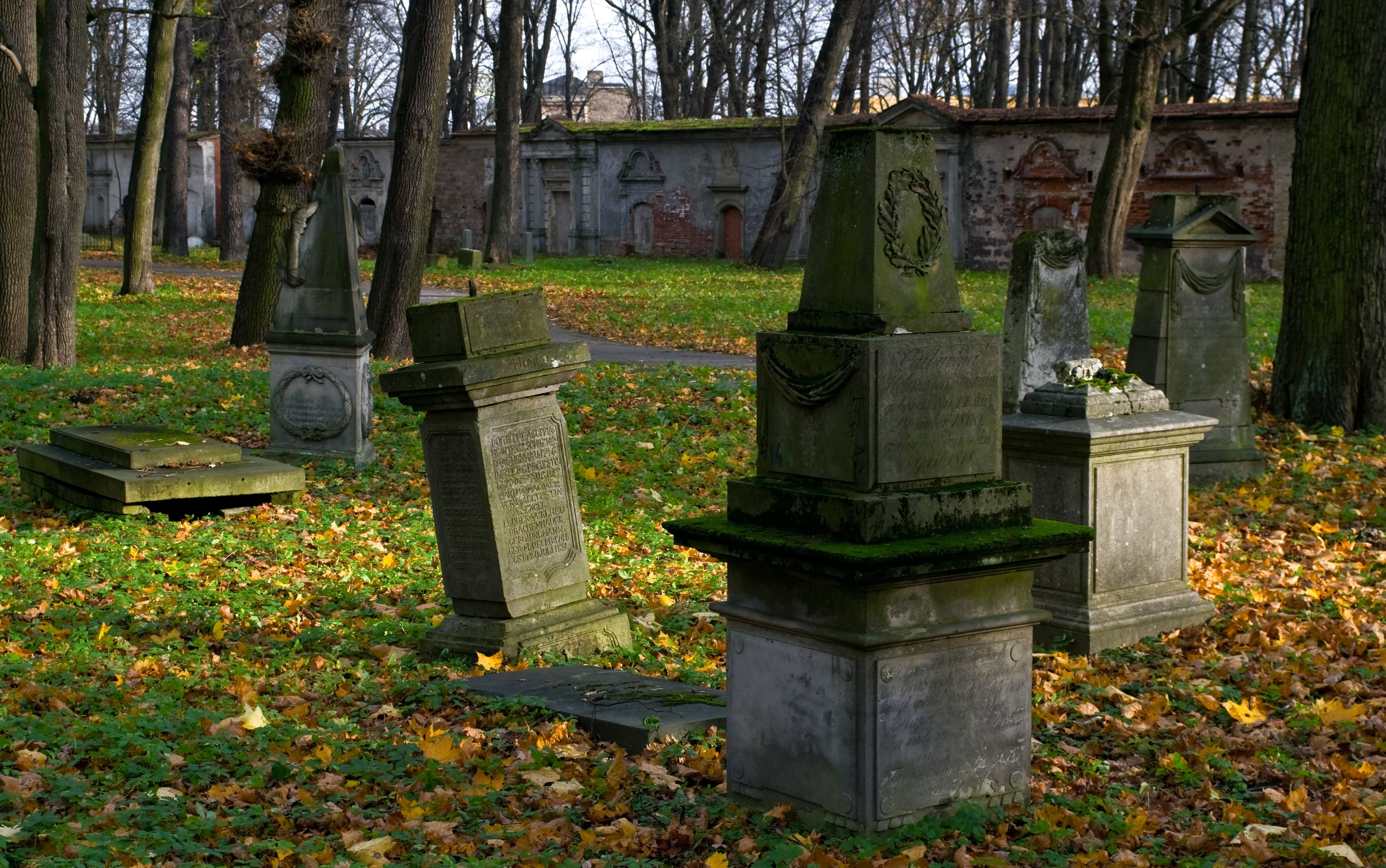
Some better preserved tombstones in Riga's Great Cemetery

Numerous statues, monuments, structures or landmarks with German writing were destroyed, vandalized or left to ruin.

The largest Baltic German cemeteries in Estonia, Kopli cemetery and Mõigu cemetery, both standing since 1774, were completely destroyed by the Soviet authorities. The Great Cemetery of Riga, the largest burial ground of Baltic Germans in Latvia, standing since 1773, also had the vast majority of its graves destroyed by the Soviets.

=== 1989 to present ===
The present-day governments of Estonia and Latvia, who regained their independence in 1991, generally take a positive, or sometimes neutral, view towards the contributions of the Baltic Germans in the development of their cities and countries throughout their history. An occasional exception to this comes with some criticism in relation to the major landowners, who controlled most of the rural areas of the Baltics, and the ethnic Estonians and Latvians, until 1918.

After Estonia regained independence from the Soviet Union on August 20, 1991, the exiled association of the German Baltic nobility sent an official message to the president-to-be Lennart Meri that no member of the association would claim proprietary rights to their former Estonian lands. This, and the fact that the first German ambassadors to Estonia and Latvia were both Baltic Germans, helped to further reconcile the Baltic Germans with these two countries.

Cooperation between Baltic German societies and the governments of Estonia and Latvia has made the restoration of many small Baltic German plaques and landmarks possible, such as monuments to those who fought in the 1918–1920 War of Independence.

Since 1989, many elderly Baltic Germans, or their descendants, have taken holidays to Estonia and Latvia to look for traces of their own past, their ancestral homes, and their family histories. Most of the remaining manor houses have new owners, and operate as hotels that are open to the public.

== Notable Baltic Germans ==
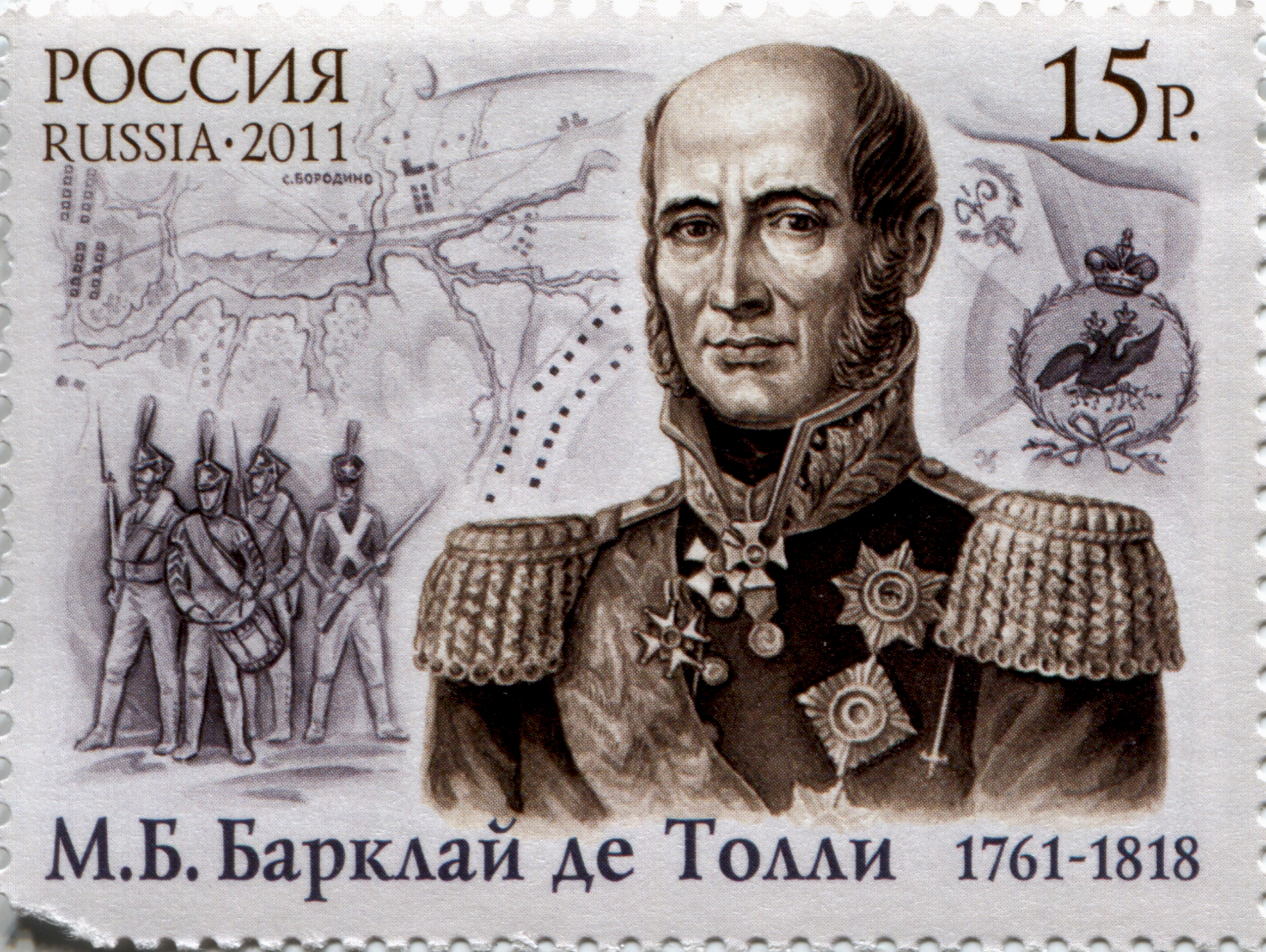
Michael Andreas Barclay de Tolly. Russia postage stamp, 2011.

Baltic Germans played leading roles in the society of what are now Estonia and Latvia throughout most of the period from 13th to mid-20th century, with many of them becoming noted scientists, including Karl Ernst von Baer, Emil Lenz, and Friedrich Zander and explorers, such as Fabian Gottlieb von Bellingshausen, Adam Johann von Krusenstern, Ferdinand von Wrangel and Otto Schmidt. A number of Baltic Germans served as ranking generals in the Russian Imperial Army and Navy, including Michael Andreas Barclay de Tolly, Friedrich Wilhelm von Buxhoeveden, Paul von Rennenkampf and Franz Eduard von Totleben.

Many Baltic Germans, such as Baron Pyotr Wrangel, Baron Ungern, Eugen Miller and Prince Anatol von Lieven, sided with the Whites and related anti-Bolshevik forces (like the Baltische Landeswehr and the Freikorps movement) during the Russian Civil War.

== Sources ==
- Short history of Baltic Germans from Berlin centre against expulsions
- Detailed history of the Baltic Germans in Estonia Archived December 23, 2007, at the Wayback Machine
- Detailed history of the Baltic Germans in Latvia Archived September 29, 2023, at the Wayback Machine
- Richards Olafs Plavnieks, 1939-1945 "Wall of blood": The Baltic German case study in national socialist wartime population policy Archived October 12, 2016, at the Wayback Machine
- European Population Transfers, 1939–1945 by Joseph B. Schechtman
- Eestist saksamaale ümberasunute nimestik : Verzeichnis der aus Estland nach Deutschland Umgesiedelten, Oskar Angelus, Tallinn 1939
- "Izceļojušo vācu tautības pilsoņu saraksts" : "The list of resettled citizens of German ethnicity". 1940
- The "repatriation" of the Baltic Germans after the signing of the pacts
- International Affairs: The Return of the Baltic Germans, E. C. Helmreich, The American Political Science Review, Vol. 36, No. 4 (Aug., 1942), pp. 711–716
- Helmreich E.C. (1942). The return of the Baltic Germans Archived July 22, 2023, at the Wayback Machine. The American Political Science Review 36.4, 711–716.
- Whelan, Heide W. (1999). Adapting to Modernity: Family, Caste and Capitalism among the Baltic German Nobility. Ostmitteleuropa in Vergangenheit und Gegenwart, vol. 22. Cologne: Böhlau Verlag, 1999. ISBN 3-412-10198-2
- Hiden, John W. (1970). The Baltic Germans and German policy towards Latvia after 1918 Archived May 17, 2023, at the Wayback Machine. The Historical Journal 13.2, 295–317.
- Hiden, John (1987). The Baltic States and Weimar Ostpolitik. Cambridge: Cambridge University Press. ISBN 0-521-89325-9
- Anders Henriksson (1983). The Tsar's Loyal Germans. The Riga Community: Social Change and the Nationality Question, 1855–1905. Boulder, Colorado: East European Monographs. ISBN 0-88033-020-1
- Mikko Ketola (2000). The Nationality Question in the Estonian Evangelical Lutheran Church, 1918–1939. Helsinki: Publications of the Finnish Society of Church History. ISBN 952-5031-17-9
- Miljan, Toivo (2004). Historical Dictionary of Estonia. Scarecrow Press. ISBN 978-0-8108-6571-6.
