= Hangashore Folk Festival =

The Hangashore Folk Festival was a folk festival based in Corner Brook, Newfoundland in 1980–1994. The festival was run by the Bay Of Islands Folk Arts Council.

Many performers played at the festival over the years including Rawlings Cross, Salt And Pepper, Driftwood, Figgy Duff, Tickle Harbour, Rankin Street (Pre Great Big Sea), and Bernie Felix.

The Festival was held in July annually in nearby Prince Edward Park attracting 10,000 patrons at its peak.

Since the festival's end in 1994, there has been no reinstatement of the Hangashore Folk Festival in Corner Brook. However, the city continues to host cultural events, including the annual March Hare literary festival, which ran until 2018, and the more recent Jigs & Wheels festival, slated for summer 2025.
