= List of cathedrals in Latvia =

This is the list of cathedrals in Latvia sorted by denomination.

== Evangelical Lutheran ==
Cathedrals of the Evangelical Lutheran Church of Latvia:

Diocese	Cathedral	Location	Image
Archdiocese of Riga	Cathedral Church of Saint Mary	Riga	
Diocese of Liepāja	Holy Trinity Cathedral	Liepāja	
Diocese of Daugavpils	Martin Luther Cathedral	Daugavpils	

== Catholic ==
Cathedrals of the Catholic Church in Latvia:

Diocese	Cathedral	Location	Image
Archdiocese of Riga	Metropolitan Cathedral of Saint James the Greater	Riga	
Diocese of Jelgava	Cathedral of the Immaculate Virgin Mary	Jelgava	
Diocese of Liepāja	Cathedral of Saint Joseph	Liepāja	
Diocese of Rēzekne-Aglona	Cathedral of the Sacred Heart of Jesus	Rēzekne	

== Eastern Orthodox ==
Cathedrals of the Latvian Orthodox Church:

Diocese	Cathedral	Location	Image
Diocese of Riga	Cathedral of the Nativity of Christ	Riga	
Diocese of Riga	St. Nicholas Naval Cathedral	Liepāja	
Diocese of Daugavpils and Rēzeknes	Saints Boris and Gleb Cathedral	Daugavpils	
Vicariate of Jelgava	St. Simeon and St. Anne's Cathedral	Jelgava	

== See also ==
- List of cathedrals
