= St. Mary's Cathedral =

St. Mary's Cathedral, St. Mary Cathedral, Cathedral of St. Mary the Virgin and similar may refer to:

== Australia ==
- St Mary Star of the Sea, West Melbourne
- St Mary's Star of the Sea Cathedral, Darwin
- St Mary's Cathedral, Hobart
- St Mary's Cathedral, Sydney
- St Mary's Cathedral, Perth
- St Mary's Cathedral, Sale

== Bangladesh ==
- St. Mary’s Cathedral, Dhaka

== Canada ==
- St. Mary's Cathedral, Calgary
- St. Mary's Cathedral, Kingston
- St. Mary's Cathedral, Winnipeg

== Estonia ==
- St Mary's Cathedral of Tallinn

== Finland ==
- Turku Cathedral, Turku, consecrated as "the Cathedral Church of the Blessed Virgin Mary and Saint Henry"

== Germany ==
- St. Mary's Cathedral (Hamburg)
- New St. Mary's Cathedral (Hamburg)
- St. Mary's Cathedral, Hildesheim

== Gibraltar ==
- Cathedral of St. Mary the Crowned

== India ==
=== Catholic ===
- St. Mary's Cathedral, Jammu
- St. Mary's Cathedral, Jalandhar
- St. Mary of the Angels Co-Cathedral, Madras
- St. Mary's Cathedral, Ranchi
- St. Mary's Cathedral, Punalur
- St. Mary's Syro-Malabar Catholic Cathedral Basilica, Ernakulam
- St Mary's Metropolitan Cathedral, Changanassery
- St. Mary's Cathedral, Pattom, Trivandrum
- St. Mary, Queen of Peace Basilica, former cathedral, Trivandrum

=== Oriental Orthodox ===
- Manarcad church, also called St. Mary's Cathedral, Manarcaud, Kerala

== Indonesia ==
- St. Mary's Cathedral, Samarinda

== Ireland ==
=== Catholic ===
- St. Mary's Cathedral, Cork (Cathedral of St Mary and St Anne)
- St Mary's Cathedral, Dublin
- St Mary's Cathedral, Kilkenny
- St Mary's Cathedral, Killarney

=== Church of Ireland ===
- St. Mary's Cathedral, Limerick
- St Mary's Cathedral, Tuam

== Italy ==
- Florence Cathedral, officially the Cattedrale di Santa Maria del Fiore (Cathedral of Saint Mary of the Flower)
- Nuoro Cathedral, officially the Cattedrale of Santa Maria della Neve (Cathedral of Our Lady of the Snows)

== Japan ==
- St. Mary's Cathedral, Tokyo

== Latvia ==
- Riga Cathedral
- Cathedral of the Immaculate Virgin Mary, Jelgava

== Lesotho ==
- Cathedral of St. Mary and St. James, Maseru, seat of the Anglican Diocese of Lesotho

== Malaysia ==
- St. Mary's Cathedral, Kuala Lumpur
- St. Mary's Cathedral, Sandakan

== Myanmar ==
- Saint Mary's Cathedral, Yangon

== Namibia ==
- St. Mary's Cathedral, Windhoek
- St. Mary's Cathedral, Rundu

== New Zealand ==
- St Mary's Cathedral, Auckland
- St Mary's Cathedral, Wellington

== Pakistan ==
- St Mary's Cathedral, Multan; see Multan Cantt#Churches

== Poland ==
- St. Mary's Cathedral, Gorzów Wielkopolski

== Serbia ==
- Cathedral of the Blessed Virgin Mary, Belgrade

== South Africa ==
- St Mary's Cathedral, Johannesburg
- St. Mary the Virgin, Port Elizabeth
- St. Mary our Lady of the Flight into Egypt, Cape Town

== Spain ==
- Cathedral of Toledo, St. Mary's Cathedral in Toledo
- Burgos Cathedral, St. Mary's Cathedral in Burgos
- León Cathedral, St. Mary's Cathedral, León
- St. Mary's Cathedral, Astorga, Spain (León (province))
- St. Mary's Cathedral ("Old Cathedral"), in Salamanca
- St. Mary's Cathedral, in Ciudad Rodrigo (province of Salamanca)
- St. Mary's Cathedral, in Segovia
- Girona's Cathedral, St. Mary's Cathedral, in Girona
- St. Mary's Cathedral ("Seu Vella"), in Lleida
- St. Mary's Cathedral, in Lugo
- Cathedral of Murcia, St. Mary's Cathedral, in Murcia
- Cathedral of Santa Maria d'Urgell, La Seu d'Urgell
- Valencia Cathedral, St. Mary's Cathedral in Valencia

== Sri Lanka ==
- St. Mary's Cathedral, Batticaloa
- St. Mary's Cathedral, Galle
- St. Mary's Cathedral, Jaffna

== United Kingdom ==
=== England ===
- Lincoln Cathedral
- St Mary's Cathedral, Newcastle upon Tyne
- St Mary's Cathedral, West Ealing, cathedral of the Assyrian Church of the East in London
- St Mary's Greek Orthodox Church, also sometimes known as St Mary's Cathedral, London
- Middlesbrough Cathedral
- Salisbury Cathedral
- Truro Cathedral

=== Scotland ===
- St Mary's Cathedral, Aberdeen
- St Mary's Cathedral, Edinburgh (Episcopal)
- St Mary's Cathedral, Edinburgh (Roman Catholic)
- St Mary's Cathedral, Glasgow

=== Wales ===
- Wrexham Cathedral, St. Mary's Cathedral, Wrexham

== United States ==
=== California ===
- Cathedral of Our Lady of the Angels, Los Angeles
- Cathedral of Saint Mary of the Assumption (San Francisco, California)

=== Colorado ===
- St. Mary's Cathedral (Colorado Springs)

=== Florida ===
- Cathedral of Saint Mary (Miami)

=== Illinois ===
- Cathedral of Saint Mary of the Immaculate Conception (Peoria, Illinois)

=== Indiana ===
- Cathedral of Saint Mary of the Immaculate Conception (Lafayette, Indiana)

=== Kentucky ===
- Cathedral Basilica of the Assumption (Covington, Kentucky)

=== Massachusetts ===
- St. Mary's Cathedral and Rectory (Fall River, Massachusetts)

=== Michigan ===
- St. Mary, Our Lady of Mount Carmel Cathedral (Gaylord, Michigan)
- St. Mary Cathedral (Lansing, Michigan)
- Cathedral of Mary of the Assumption (Saginaw, Michigan)

=== Minnesota ===
- Cathedral of Saint Mary (St. Cloud, Minnesota)
- St. Mary's Orthodox Cathedral (Minneapolis) in Northeast, Minneapolis
- Basilica of Saint Mary (Minneapolis), Co-cathedral

=== Missouri ===
- Cathedral of St. Mary of the Annunciation (Cape Girardeau, Missouri)

=== New Jersey ===
- Cathedral of St. Mary of the Assumption (Trenton, New Jersey)

=== New York ===
- St. Mary's Cathedral (Ogdensburg, New York)

=== North Carolina ===
- St. Mary Coptic Orthodox Cathedral, Raleigh

=== North Dakota ===
- Cathedral of St. Mary (Fargo, North Dakota)

=== Oregon ===
- St. Mary's Cathedral (Portland, Oregon)

=== Tennessee ===
- St. Mary's Episcopal Cathedral (Memphis, Tennessee)

=== Texas ===
- St. Mary's Cathedral (Amarillo, Texas)
- Cathedral of Saint Mary (Austin, Texas)
- St. Mary Cathedral Basilica (Galveston, Texas)

=== Wyoming ===
- St. Mary's Catholic Cathedral (Cheyenne, Wyoming)

== See also ==
- Cathedral of Saint Mary of the Assumption (disambiguation)
- St. Mary's Church (disambiguation)
- St. Marie's Cathedral, Sheffield
