= Johann Friedrich von Recke =

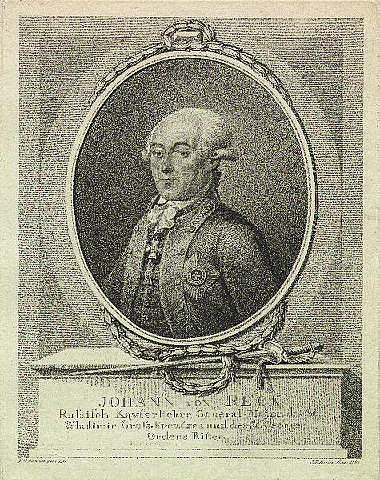
- Born: August 1, 1764; Mitau, Duchy of Courland and Semigallia, now Jelgava, Latvia
- Died: September 13, 1846 (aged 82); Mitau, Russian Empire, now Latvia
- Occupations: Public Administrator; Antiquarian; Collector; Lexicographer

Johann Friedrich von Recke (1 August 1764 – 13 September 1846) was a senior public official in the Baltic Germans Duchy of Courland. He is remembered now, primarily, for his activities as an antiquarian and collector.

Following his withdrawal from government service he became the co-compiler of the General Writers and Scholars Lexicon of the provinces of Latvia, Estonia and Courland (Allgemeine Schriftsteller- und Gelehrten-Lexikon der Provinzen Livland, Esthland und Kurland).

== Life ==
=== Provenance and education ===
Johann Friedrich von Recke was born in Mitau, the capital of the Duchy of Courland, which by the time of his death had been incorporated into Russia. Today (2015) Mitau is in Latvia.

Recke's father was a merchant, and for some time the city mayor. His father died around the time he was eight, however. From 1774 till 1779 he attended the city's main school, which at that time was under the joint headship of K. A. Kütner and Johann Heinrich Kant whose brother, Immanuel Kant, was already making his name as a philosopher in Königsberg, to the south. Von Recke then, between 1779 and 1781, attended Mitau's Petrina Academy (as it was then known). In 1781 he commenced his university level studies at Göttingen in order to study jurisprudence and philosophy. His studies at Göttingen also embraced history, statistics, ancient artefacts and the arts. An approximate contemporary at Göttingen was Piter Poel, a member of the influential ZN (student fraternity): Poel later made mention of von Recke in his own memoirs. After his university years he crowned his formal education with a tour of Europe, with extended stays in Berlin, Paris and Leipzig. Johann von Recke returned to Mitau during 1785.

=== Public service ===
In Mitau he was sponsored for a position in public service by Duke Peter of Courland. Between 1787 and 1788 von Recke worked for the duchy's Archive and Administration secretary (Archiv- und Lehnsekretär), then taking over the office himself in 1788. He retained the post till 1795 when Duke Peter was persuaded to agree to the incorporation of the Duchy of Courland into Russia, as a little noticed (in English language sources) concomitant of the Third Partition of Poland. On 28 January 1796 he was appointed secretary to the Courland Governorate. Further promotion, to the post of "Kameralhofsrath", followed in 1801. In 1818 he was one of founding members of Kurland Provincial Museum and Athenaeum. In 1824 he was also appointed to the Russian State Council. This was also the year in which, now aged 60, he was awarded the Order of St. Vladimir 4th class. Between September 1824 and March 1825 he served as interim deputy governor of Courland, following the summary dismissal of deputy governor Martin von Bataille who had been accused of corruption. In 1826 von Recke was himself dismissed from his post because of embezzlement by a subordinate employee in his department. It was only some years later that he was exonerated and the government agreed to pay him his pension.

=== Scholarship ===
During the early years of the nineteenth century, between 1805 and 1808 Johann von Recke published the "Weekly Update for Lovers of German Literature in Russia" ("Wöchentliche Unterhaltungen für Liebhaber deutscher Lekture in Russland") and the "New Weekly Update, mostly Themed on Arts and Literature" ("Neue wöchentlich Unterhaltungen, grössentheils Gegenstände über der Kunst und Litteratur"). He was subsequently, on 23 November 1815, one of seven co-founders of the Courland Society for Literature and the Arts ("Die Kurländische Gesellschaft für Litteratur und Kunst)". Following his enforced retirement in 1826 he was also able to devote his considerable energy to building up the Courland Provincial Museum which he had created in 1818. In 1826, together with Karl Eduard von Napiersky, he produced the first of what would be several volumes of the General Writers and Scholars Lexicon of the provinces of Latvia, Estonia and Courland (Allgemeine Schriftsteller- und Gelehrten-Lexikon der Provinzen Livland, Esthland und Kurland).
