= Karl Eduard von Napiersky =

Latvian clergyman and historian

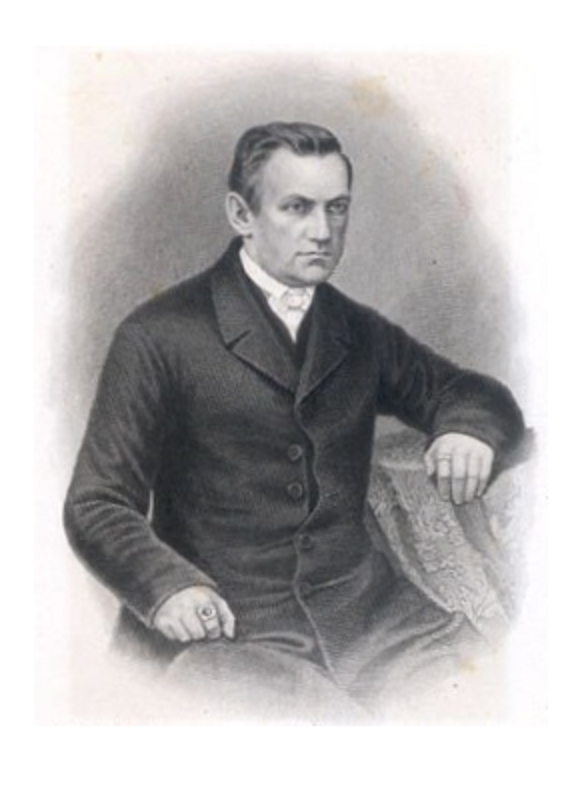
Karl Eduard von Napiersky

Karl Eduard von Napiersky (21 May 1793, Riga – 2 September 1864, Riga) was a Latvian clergyman and historian.

He studied theology at the Imperial University of Dorpat, and from 1814 onward, served as a pastor in the municipality of Neu-Pebalg. From 1829 to 1849 he was director of government schools and gymnasiums in Riga. In 1851 he became a member of the newly established censorship committee in Riga.

He was an early member of the Lettisch-Literärische Gesellschaft (1827) and one of the founders of the Gesellschaft für Geschichte und Alterthumskunde der Ostseeprovinzen Rußlands (1833/34).

== Published works ==
With Johann Friedrich von Recke, he published a four volume encyclopedia of Livonia, Estonia and Courland, titled Allgemeines Schriftsteller- und Gelehrten-Lexikon der provinzen Livland, Esthland und Kurland (1827–1832). His other noted literary efforts include:

- Fortgesetzte Abhandlung von livländischen Geschichtschreibern : ein literar-historischer und bibliographischer Versuch, 1823 – Continued treatise of Livonian historians.
- Index corporis historico-diplomatici Livoniae, Esthoniae, Curoniae, 1833.
- Beiträge zur Geschichte der Kirchen und Prediger in Livland, 1843 – Contributions to the history of churches and preachers in Livonia.
- Chronologischer Abriss der älteren Geschichte Livlands, 1848 – Chronological outline on the early history of Livonia.
- Russisch-livländische Urkunden, 1868 – Russian-Livonian documents.
