= Kurland Provincial Museum and Athenaeum =

Museum in Jelgava, Latvia

Coordinates: 56°39′00″N 23°44′00″E

Kurland Provincial Museum and Athenaeum (German: Kurländischen Provinzial-Museums und Athenäum) was Kurzeme Society of Literature and Art museum with library. It was founded in 1818 in Mitau (since 1917 Jelgava), at that time the capital of Courland Governorate of Russian Empire.

== History ==
The museum was founded on August 6, 1818 as the Kurzeme Provincial Museum with a lecture club "Athenaeum". Among founding members of new society was Johann Friedrich von Recke. The lectures were initially held on the premises of Jelgava Gymnasium, after 1820 on the second floor of the Johann Friedrich Steffenhagen printing house on Kannulējēju (now Mātera iela (Jelgava)), where the first museum collection was created.

Riga's architect Wilhelm Neumann developed a project for a new museum building, which was built on the site of the demolished Jelgava Theater building in the former Stļļplacis (near the present Jāņa Čakstes bulvāris) and opened on November 26, 1898. The entrance portal of the house was decorated with the inscription in Latin "Science and Art". In 1916, Jelgavas loža "Pie vācu zobena Austrumos" was established in the museum hall. In 1935, the Latvian government confiscated the museum's collections and transferred the collections of the society and the museum's archives to the State Archives. During the emigration of the Baltic Germans on November 4, 1939, the Minister of Public Affairs of Latvia A. Bērziņš issued an order to liquidate the Kurzeme Literary and Art Society. Only the portraits in the museum hall were allowed to be removed from the values owned by the society, except for the portrait of Johann Reinhold Patkul and one work by Janis Rozentāls, as well as paintings by German authors, "Academia Petrina" and later gymnasium professors, pastors, copper engravings the whole library. The whole department of archeology, ethnographic collections, department of natural sciences, portraits of the Dukes of Courland had to remain in Latvia. The museum's collections were transferred to the ownership of the State Historical Museum.

After the Soviet occupation of Latvia in 1940, in the autumn of the same year the Kurland Provincial Museum building was handed over to the Latvian SSR People's Commissariat of Education. During the Red Army's attack in the summer of 1944, the museum building was destroyed. Some of the funds had previously been evacuated to Germany, others had disappeared or perished.

== Legacy ==
Nowadays, the heating unit of Uzvaras Street residential buildings and other buildings have been built in this place.

Antiquities from the Kurzeme Provincial Museum have been kept by Ģ. Elias at the Jelgava Museum of History and Art.
