= St. Simeon and St. Anne's Cathedral, Jelgava =

Church in Jelgava, Latvia

St Simeon and St Anne Cathedral
- Jelgavas Sv. Simeona un Sv. Annas pareizticīgo katedrāle Собор Симеона и Анны
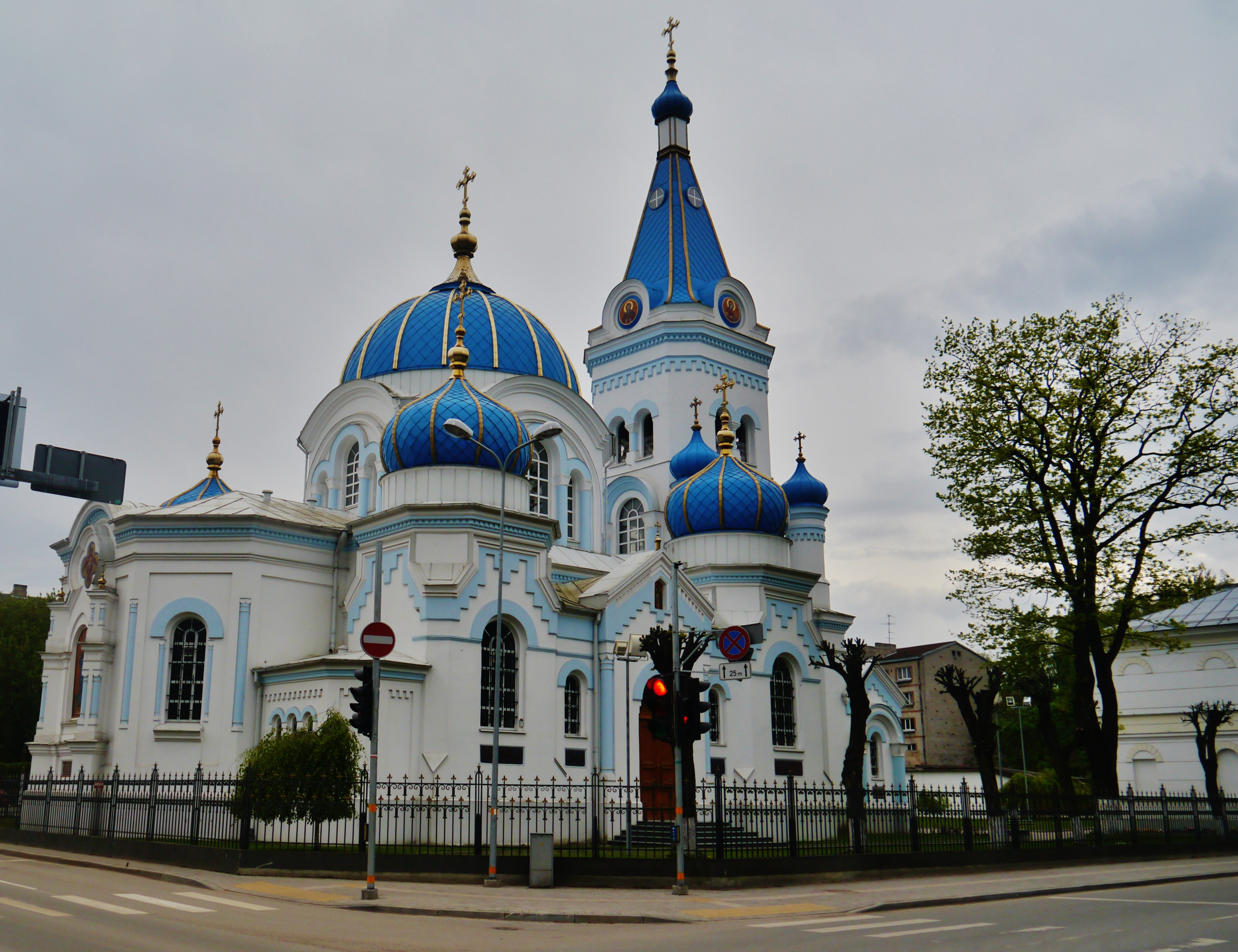
- St Simeon and St Anne Cathedral
- 56°38′56″N 23°43′46″E
- Location: Jelgava
- Country: Latvia
- Denomination: Eastern Orthodox
- Churchmanship: Latvian Orthodox Church

History
- Status: Active
- Dedication: Simeon; Anna the Prophetess
- Dedicated: 1892

Architecture
- Functional status: Church
- Style: Russian architecture
- Years built: 1890-1892
- Groundbreaking: 1890
- Completed: 1892

The Cathedral of Sts Simeon and Anne (Latvian: Jelgavas Sv. Simeona un Sv. Annas pareizticīgo katedrāle, Russian: Собор Симеона и Анны), located at 12 Akadēmijas Street in Jelgava, is a cathedral of the Latvian Orthodox Church, one of four Orthodox cathedrals in Latvia.

== History ==
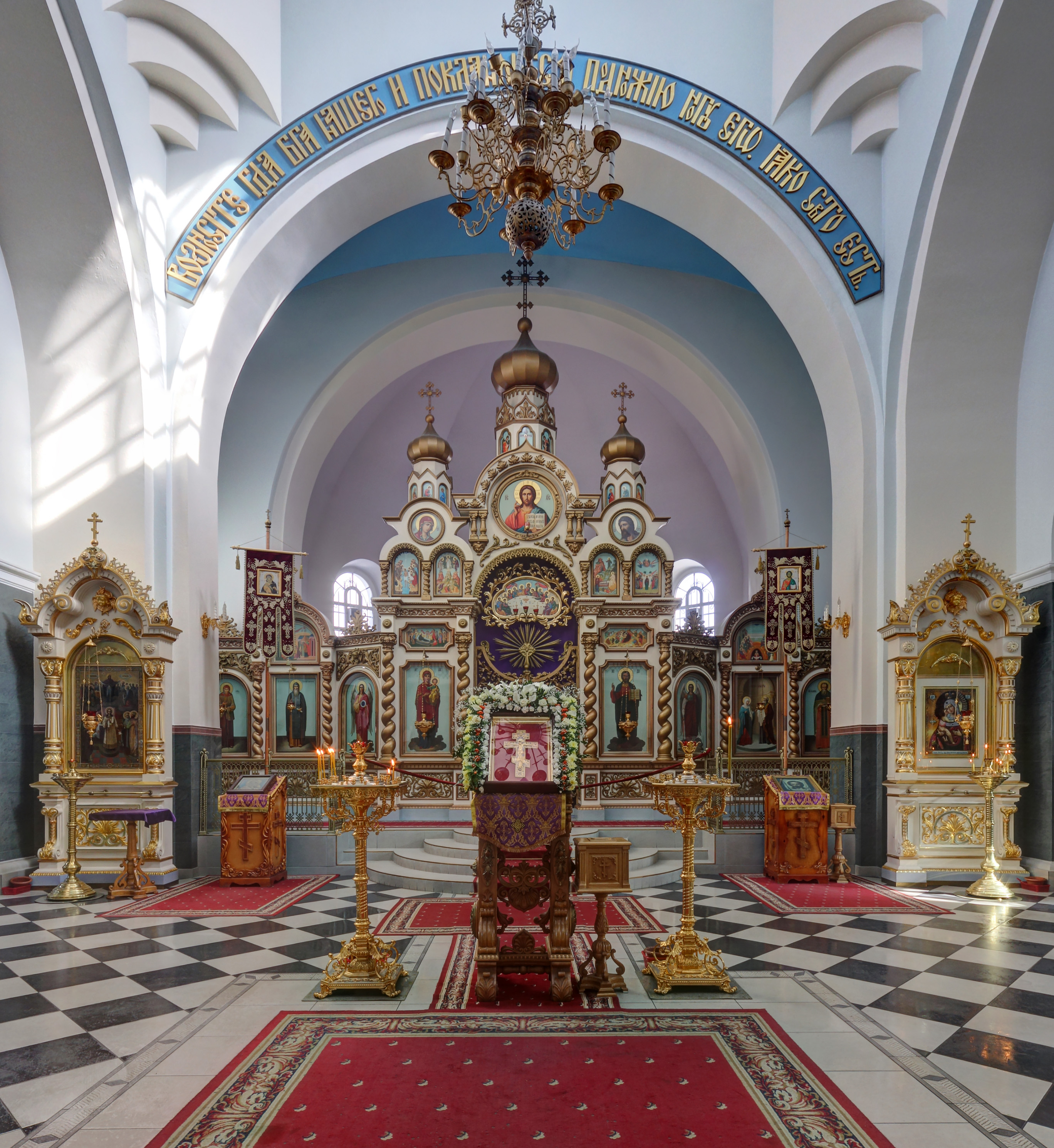
Interior of the cathedral

The church traces its history to 1710, when Peter the Great, Tsar of Russia, arranged the marriage of his niece Anna to Frederick William, Duke of Courland. The duke promised to build an Orthodox church in Jelgava (then known as Mitau), his capital, but his premature death prevented this. Anna was sent to Jelgava in 1712 and ruled there with the advice of Pyotr Bestuzhev-Ryumin, who directed a wooden church be constructed in 1726. In 1774, a stone church designed by Francesco Bartolomeo Rastrelli replaced this building.

The cathedral was built between 1890 and 1892, with the financial support of Tsar Alexander III of Russia, on designs made by architect Nikolai Chagin, of Vilnius.

The cathedral was destroyed in August 1944 amidst World War II, and remained in ruins during the Soviet period. After Latvia regained its independence, the church was returned to the Orthodox congregation and the cathedral was restored over the next ten years, the process being finished in 2003. The cathedral has nine bells in the bell-tower with the largest bell weighing 830 kg. Particularly striking are the golden domes decorated with blue stripes.
