= Jelgava =

State city in Semigallia, Latvia

- State city
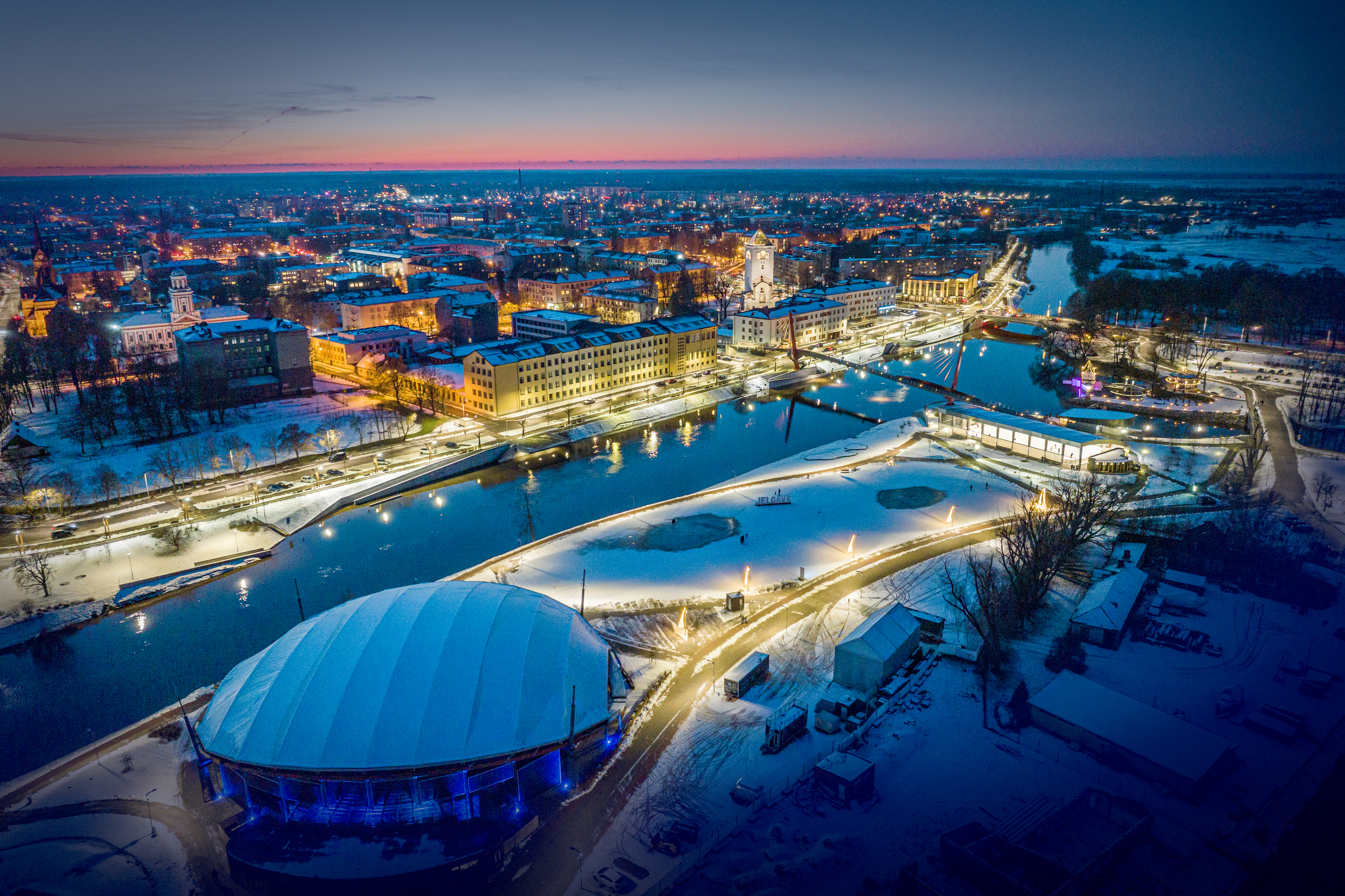
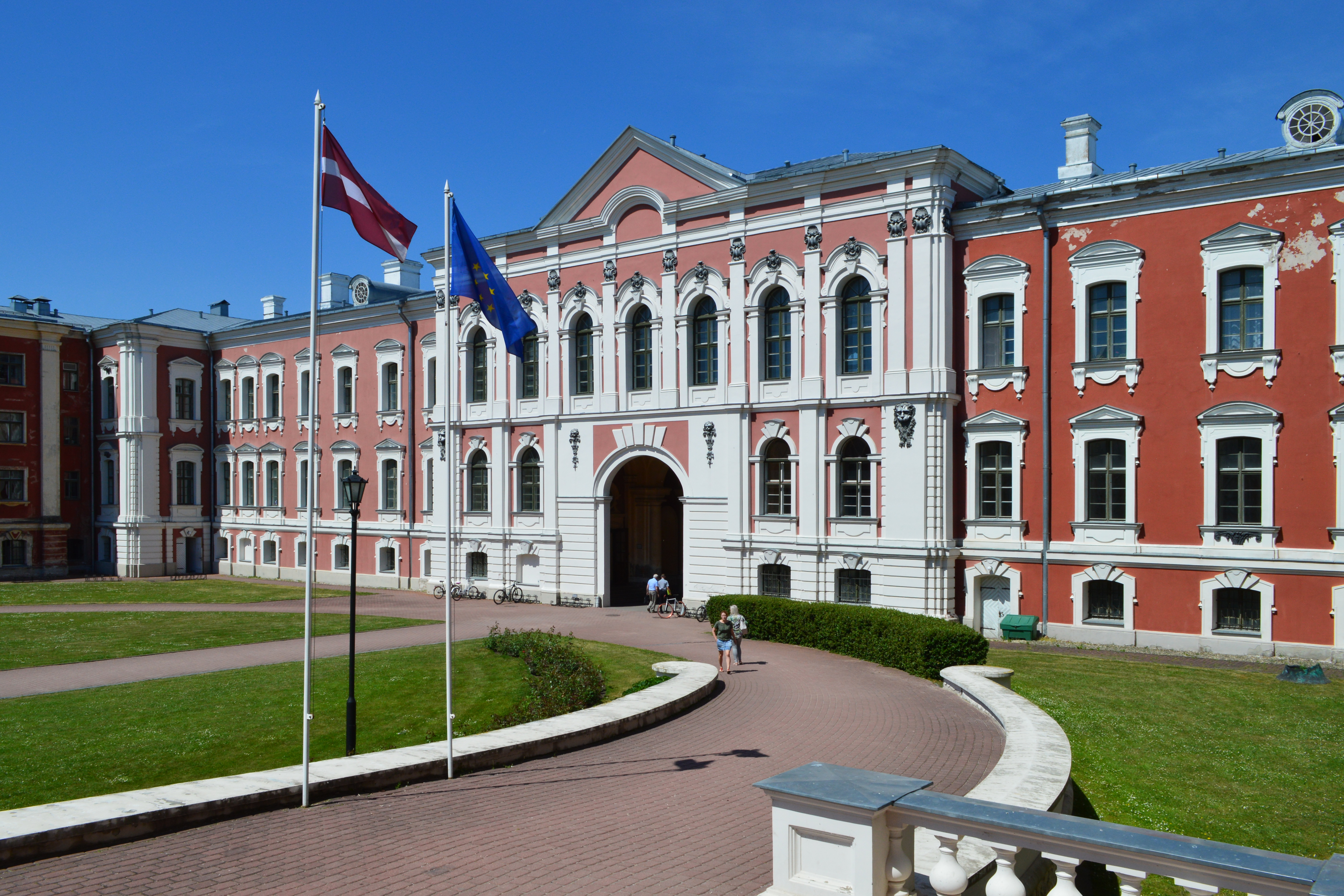
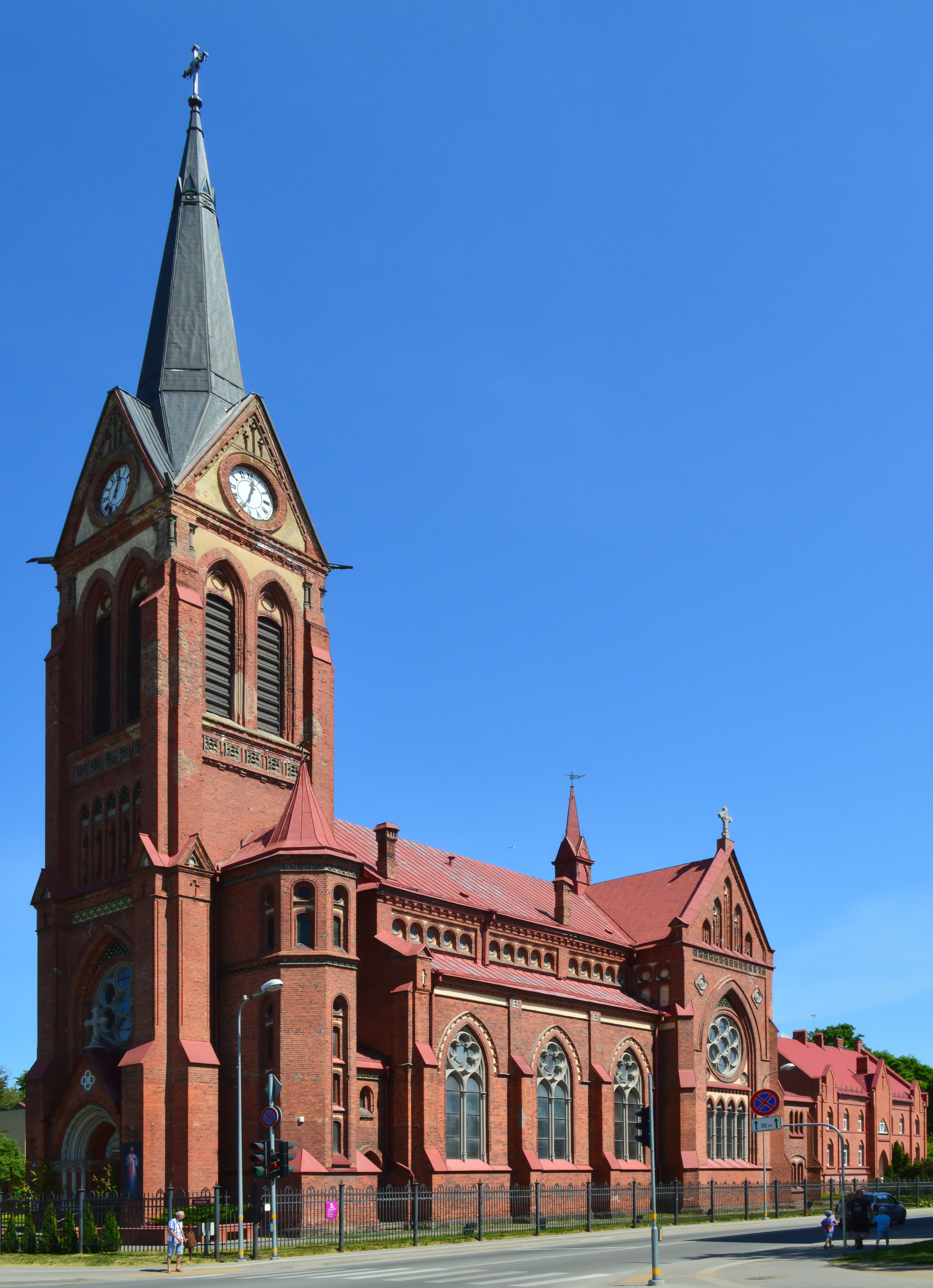
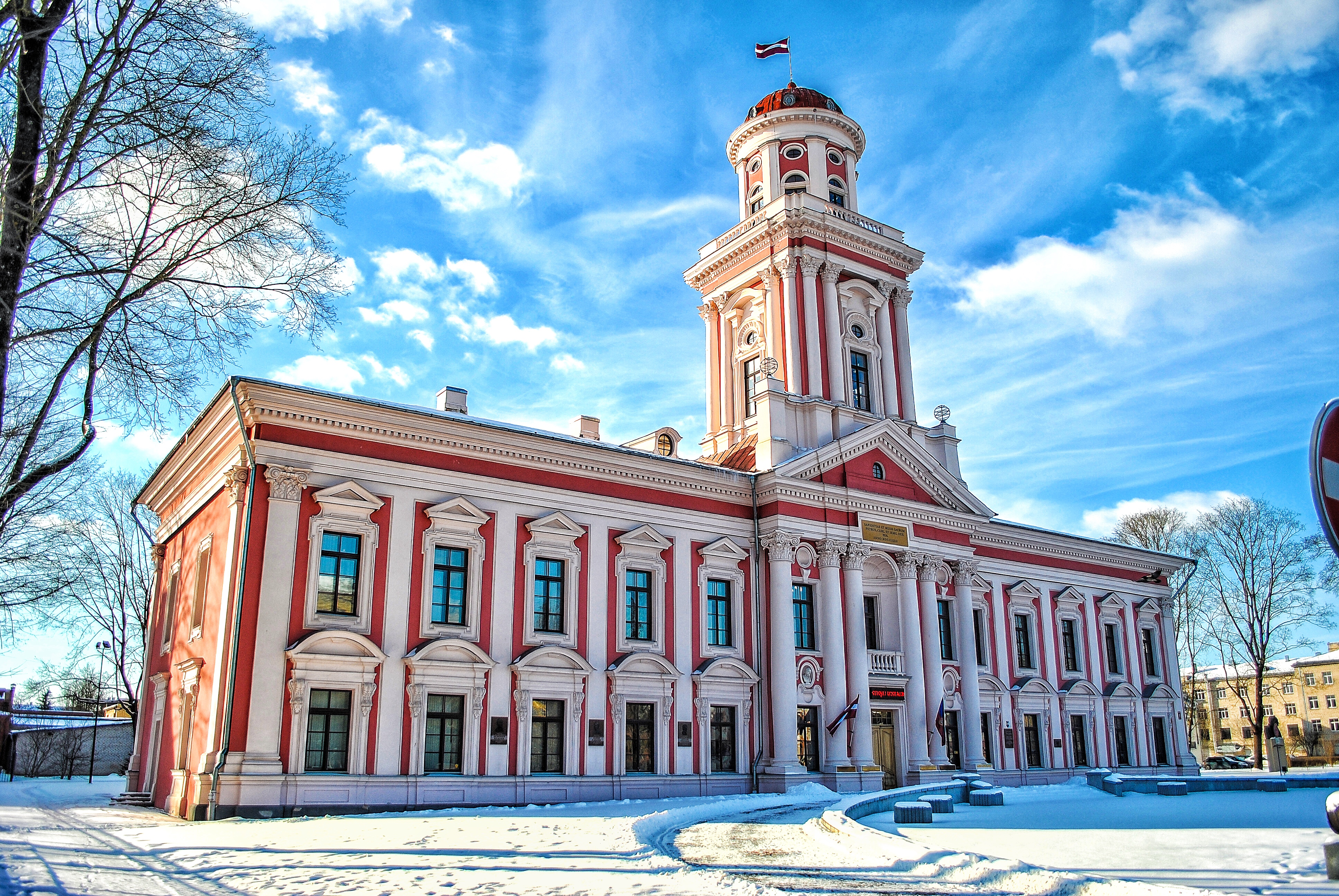
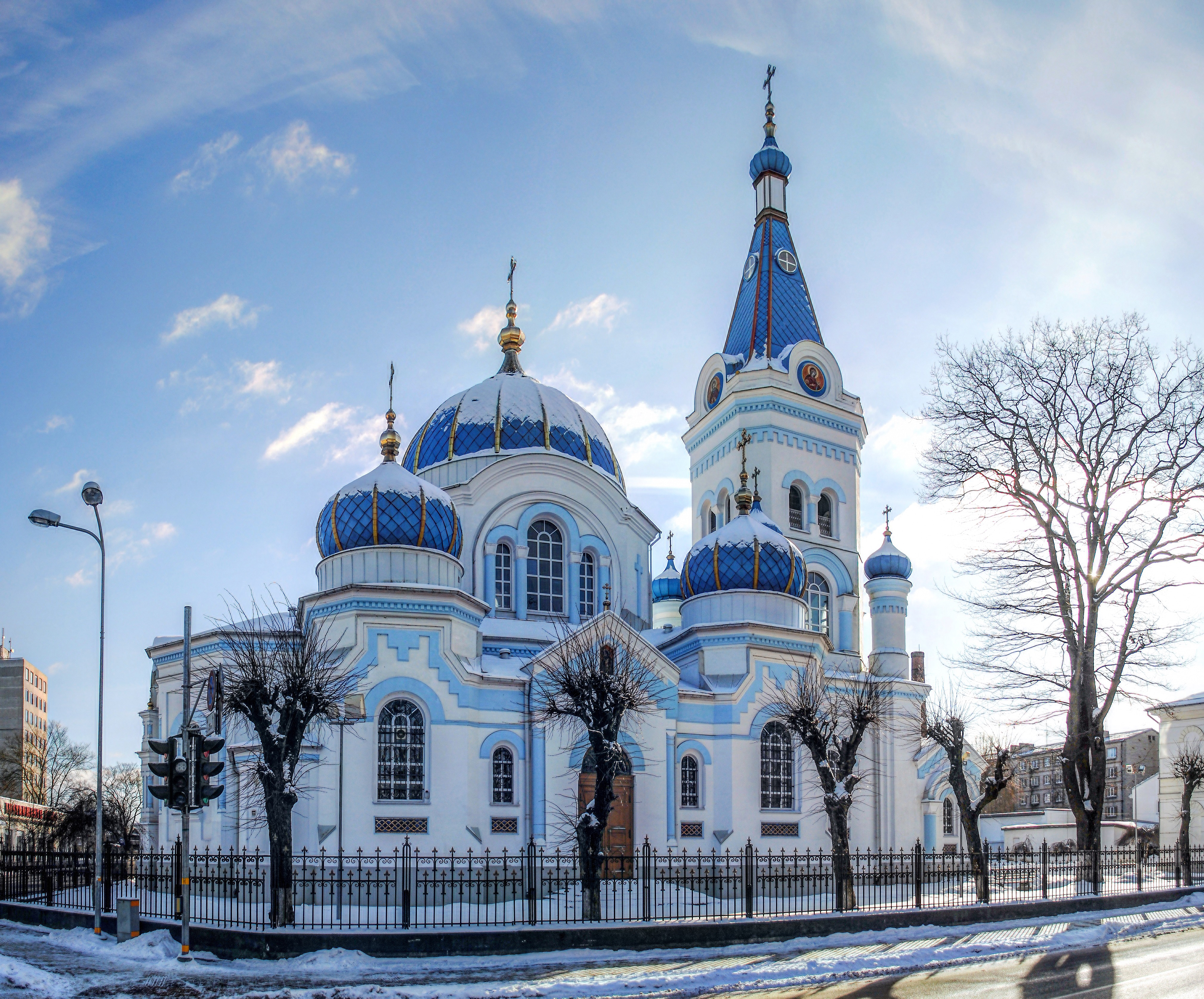
- Aerial view of Jelgava Jelgava Palace Cathedral of the Immaculate Virgin Mary Academia Petrina St Simeon and St Anne's Cathedral

- Flag Coat of arms Brandmark

- Location in Latvia
- Coordinates: 56°38′54″N 23°42′50″E
- Country: Latvia
- Town rights: 1573

Government
  - Mayor: Mārtiņš Daģis (Movement For!)
  - Number of City Council members: 15

Area
  - Total: 60.56 km^{2} (23.38 sq mi)
  - Land: 56.97 km^{2} (22.00 sq mi)
  - Water: 3.59 km^{2} (1.39 sq mi)
- Elevation: 13 m (43 ft)

Population (2026)
  - Total: 54,408
  - Density: 955.0/km^{2} (2,474/sq mi)
- Demonym: Jelgavnieki (Latvian)

GDP
  - State city: 740,034,000 euro (2021)
  - Per capita: 13,462 euro (2021)
- Time zone: UTC+2 (EET)
  - Summer (DST): UTC+3 (EEST)
- Postal code: LV-300(1–9); LV-3024; LV-3035
- Calling code: (+371) 630
- Website: www.jelgava.lv

Jelgava (pronounced [ˈjælˠɡɐvˠɐ]) is a state city in central Latvia. It is located about 41 kilometres (25 miles) southwest of Riga. With 54,408 people, it is the fourth most-populous city in Latvia. It is the largest town in the Semigallia region of Latvia. Jelgava was the capital of the united Duchy of Courland and Semigallia (1578–1795) and was the administrative center of the Courland Governorate (1795–1918).

Jelgava is situated on a fertile plain rising only 3.5 metres (11.5 feet) above mean sea level on the right bank of the river Lielupe. At high water, the plain and sometimes the town as well can be flooded. It is a railway center, and is also a host to the Jelgava Air Base. Its importance as a railway centre can be seen by the fact that it lies at the junction of over 6 railway lines connecting Riga to Lithuania, eastern and western Latvia, and Lithuania to the Baltic Sea.

== Name ==
Until 1917, the city was officially referred to as Mitau (German pronunciation: [ˈmiːtaʊ]). The name of Jelgava is believed to be derived from the Livonian word jālgab, meaning "town on the river." The origin of the German name Mitau is unclear, although it is suggested that it came from the Latvian words mīt or mainīt, meaning "to exchange" or "to trade," thus making it "trading-place." An alternate explanation is that Mitau came from Mitte in der Aue, which is German for "the middle of the Aa", referring to the Lielupe River, formerly known as the Courland Aa (German: Kurländische Aa).

In Polish, the city was known as Mitawa. In Yiddish, the city was known as מיטאַווע (Mitave) or מיטאַו (Mitau).

In publications dating from the Soviet period, the city name was occasionally spelled in English as "Yelgava", a back-transliteration from Russian Елгава.

== History ==
=== Early history ===
Settlement began developing in the Mitau locality between the rivers Lielupe and Driksa during the 10th century. Led by the Grand Master Konrad von Mandern, the crusading Livonian Order constructed the castle in Mitau on a natural island fortification (Pilssala) in 1265–1266. Using Mitau as a southern fortress, the German knights subdued the surrounding Livonians and Semigallians by 1290. The town rose in importance as a defensive fixture against the Lithuanians to the south, who succeeded in plundering Mitau in 1345.

=== Early modern period ===
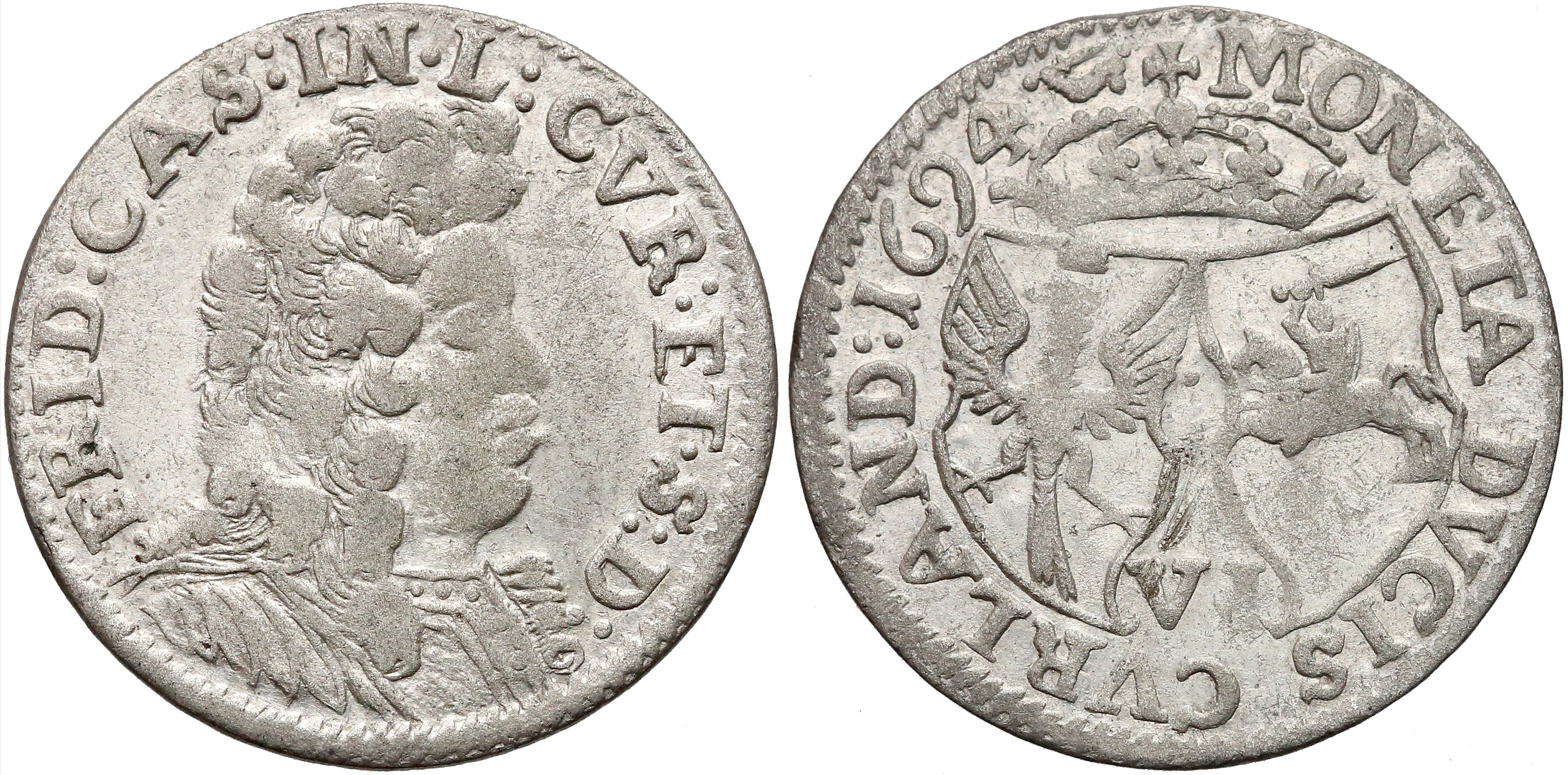
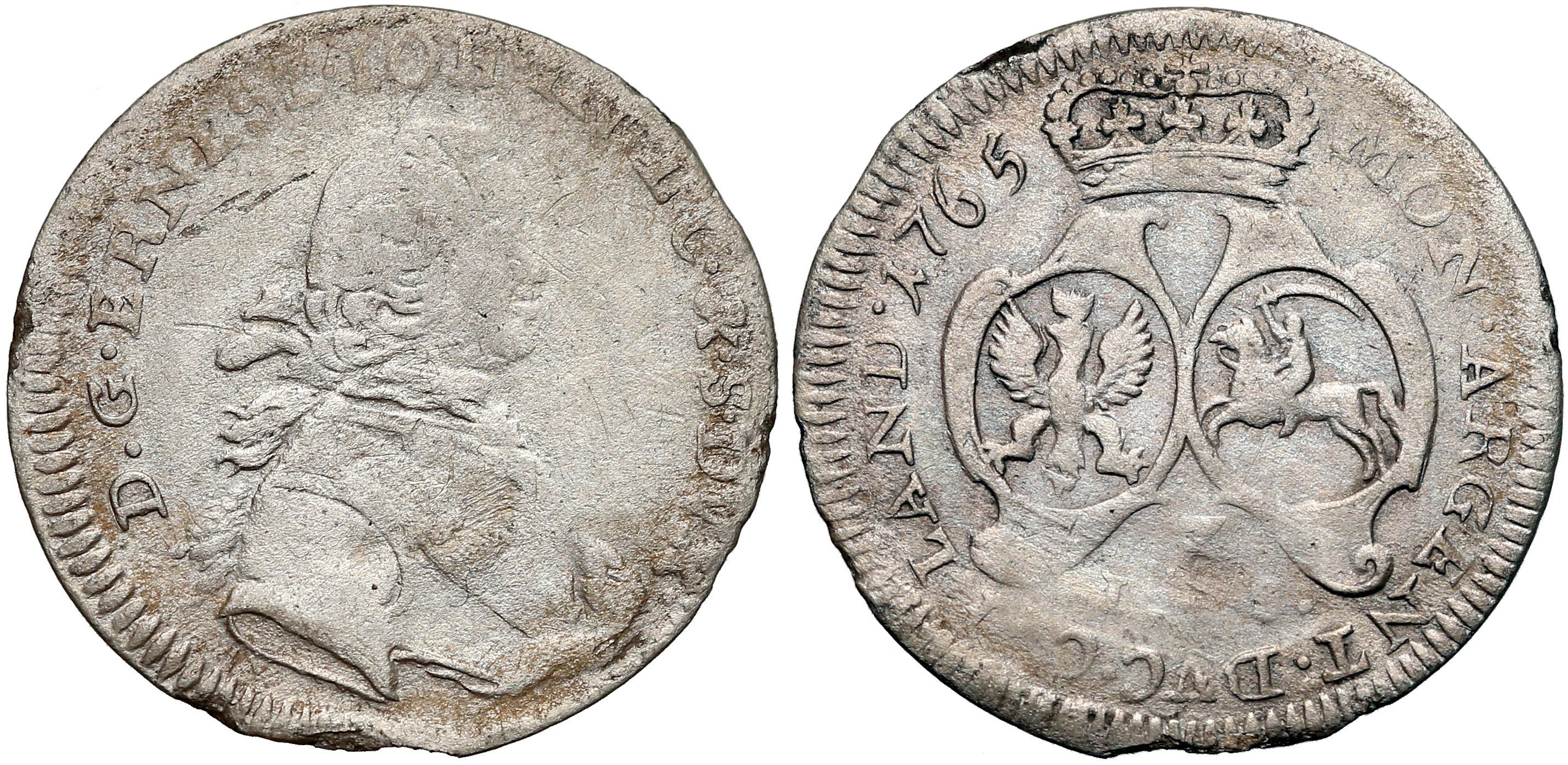
17th and 18th-century coins from the local mint

As a result of the fall of the Livonian Order in the Livonian War of 1558-1583, Mitau became a town of the Duchy of Courland in 1561. Mitau received city rights in 1573, and became the capital of the united duchies of Courland and Semigallia in 1578. When the Duchy of Courland split in 1596, Mitau became the residence of Duke Friedrich Kettler of Semigallia. The city again became the capital of the united duchies in 1617. Because the duchy became a vassal of the Polish–Lithuanian Commonwealth from 1561, Mitau was also referred to by the Polish name Mitawa. The repeated Swedish invasions of the Polish–Lithuanian Commonwealth subjected Mitau to several sieges. Despite the wars, the city grew as a center for trade and industry. As Courland's neighbors increased in strength, however, the duchy - and Mitau - began to fall under Russia's sphere of influence.

The Tsar of Russia, Peter the Great, received a promise from duke Friedrich Wilhelm that he would marry one of the daughters of the tsar's late half-brother. In 1710, Friedrich Wilhelm married Anna Ioannovna (daughter of Tsar Ivan V (r. 1682–1696), and herself later Empress of Russia), but on his way back from St Petersburg, he took ill and died (1711). Anna ruled as the duchess of Courland from 1711 to 1730.

The penultimate duke of Courland, Ernst Johann von Biron (r. 1737–1740 and 1763–1769), expanded the cultural aspects of Mitau. He constructed the ducal palace and opened the first public library in the city. In 1775 the last Duke of Courland, Peter von Biron (r. 1769–1795), founded the Academia Petrina, which became a cultural center for the country. The duke also encouraged theatrical performances at his court.

=== Late modern period ===
With the outbreak of the French Revolution in 1789, the citizens of Mitau clamored for more rights. Later, Imperial Russia annexed the city as part of Courland in 1795 during the Third Partition of Poland. The Count of Provence lived at the palace of Mitau (1798–1801 and 1804–1807) before he became the French king Louis XVIII in 1814. Although the city was occupied by Prussian troops during the Napoleonic Wars, it was largely spared destruction.

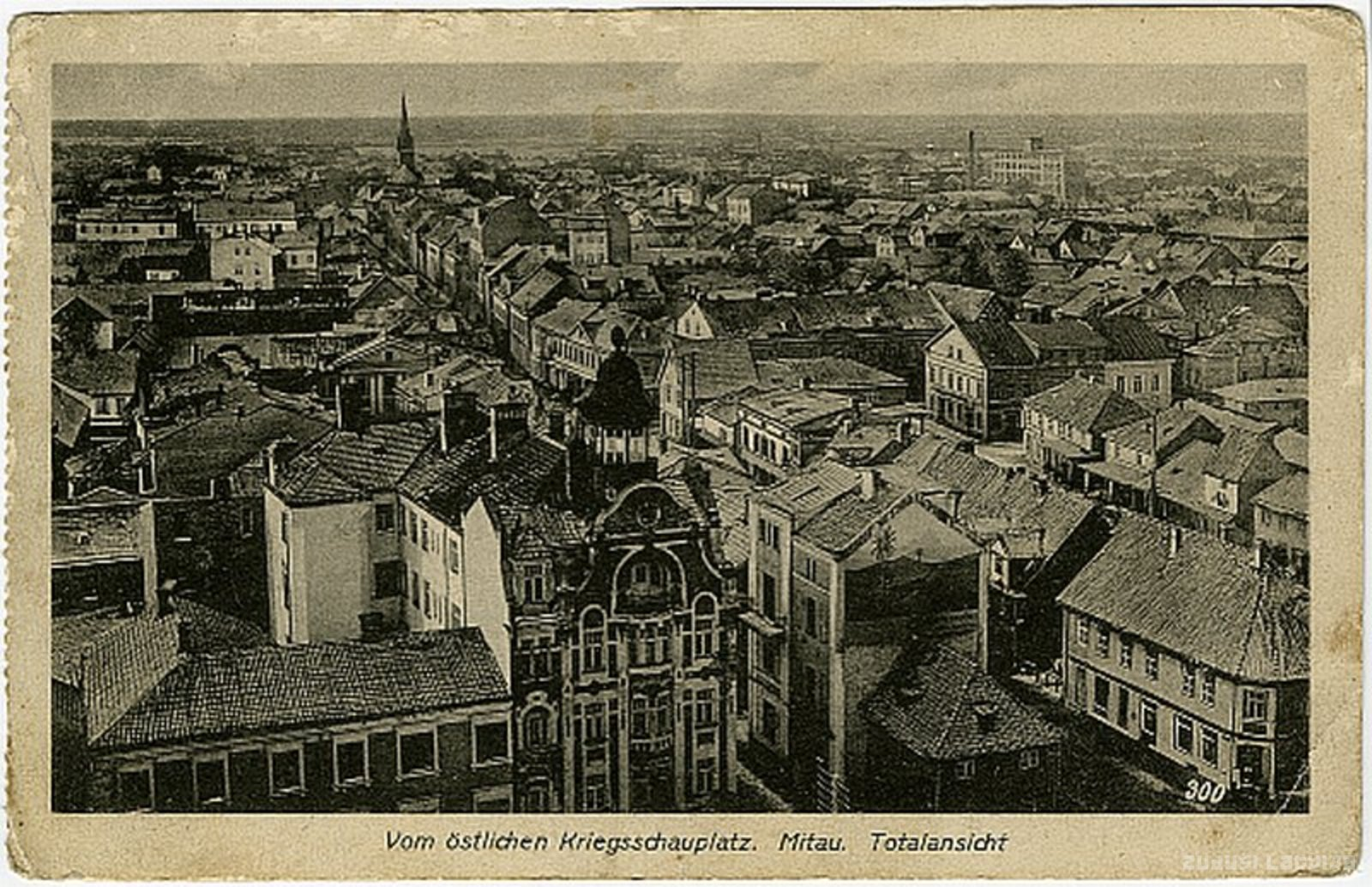
Jelgava in 1935

Mitau further expanded after the construction of its railway in 1868. The development of its infrastructure encouraged rural Latvians to migrate to the city, as merchants, craftsmen, teachers, and officials. By 1914 Mitau had over 45,000 inhabitants. However, Mitau suffered considerably after the outbreak of World War I in 1914. The spirited defence of Mitau by two battalions of the Latvian Home Guard in 1915 helped inspire the formation of the Latvian Rifles. German troops occupied the city during the war, and British prisoners of war, sent there as forced labour, suffered atrocious conditions and treatment. After the war, in 1919, Mitau became a battleground between Bolshevik Red Guards, German paramilitaries, and Latvian freedom-fighters. After the victory of the latter group in November 1919, Mitau renamed to Jelgava, became an important city in independent Latvia. In 1925 a sugar factory was built in Jelgava, the first such factory in Latvia. In 1939 Jelgava Academy of Agriculture opened in the Jelgava Palace.

=== World War II ===
As a result of the Nazi-Soviet Pact of 1939, Jelgava was occupied and annexed with the rest of Latvia by the Soviet Union in 1940. Many of the city's remaining German population were resettled into the territory of German-occupied Poland during the Nazi–Soviet population transfers. German forces from Army Group North occupied Jelgava from 1941 to 1944 until the re-capture of the city by the Red Army. During World War II, German police along with Latvian auxiliary police murdered the Jewish inhabitants of the city during a series of mass shootings (see Jelgava massacres). The main synagogue was burned to the ground.

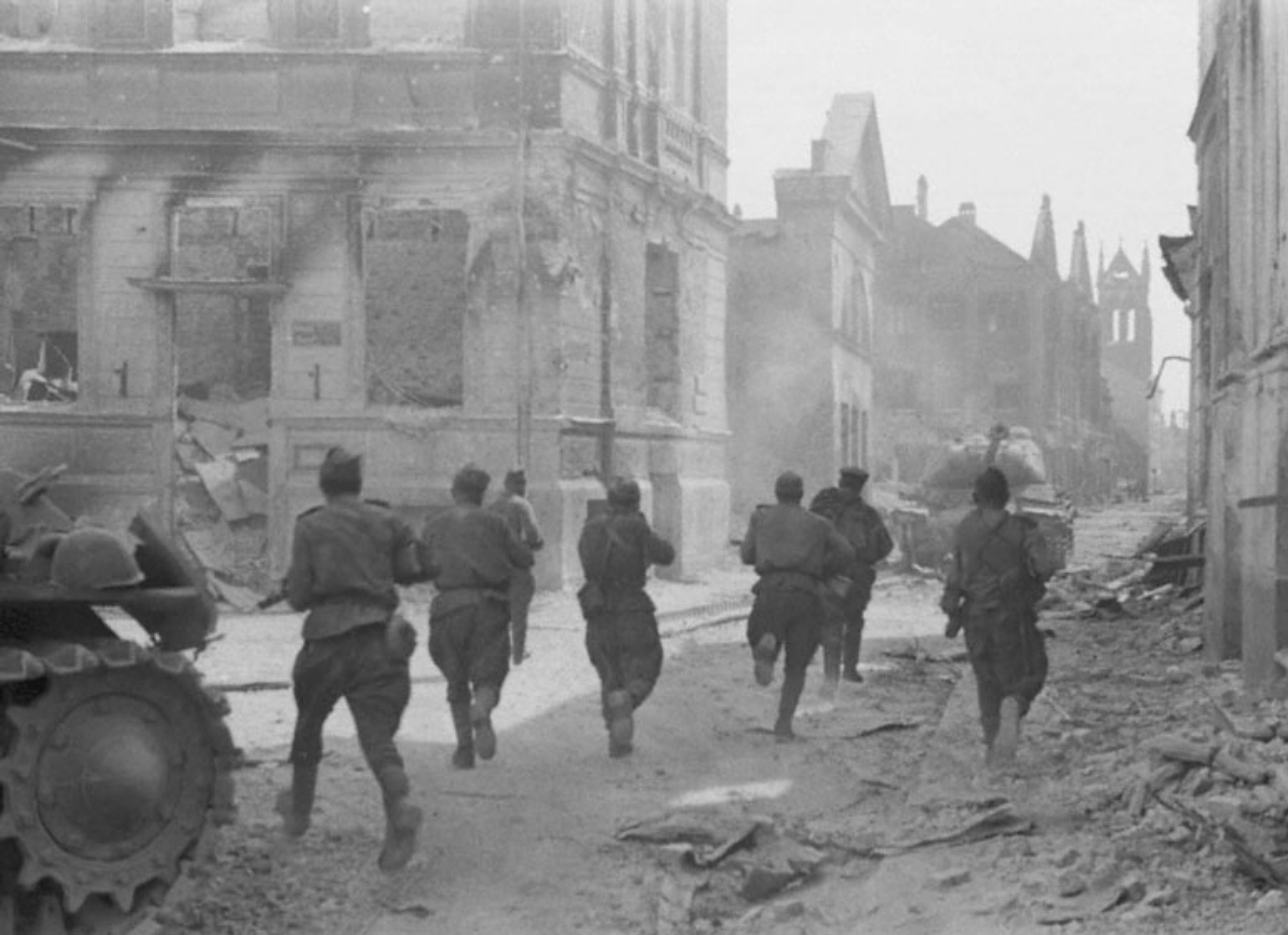
Soviet soldiers fight in the streets of Jelgava in the summer of 1944

In late July 1944, the Soviet Red army launched an attack from the south in the direction of Jelgava and Tukums to encircle the German Army Group North. Jelgava was declared a fortress (Festung) however, there were only a few scattered German and Latvian units in the city. From 30 July until 7 August, after heavy street fighting and several air raids, the Red Army managed to occupy the left bank of the Lielupe river. In late August, the German army launched a counterattack on Jelgava from the north but it failed to drive back the Soviets. Jelgava remained on the frontline until 10 October when the German army retreated to Courland. The city's historic centre, industry, rail network, and public buildings were heavily damaged by the fighting, with almost 90% of the city destroyed. Among lost buildings was famous Kurland Provincial Museum and Athenaeum.

=== Post-war period ===
Jelgava was rebuilt in typical Soviet style after World War II as part of the Latvian SSR. Jelgava became home to several big factories. Among them were the sugar factory, which was heavily expanded from 1975 assembly line, and administration buildings for the Riga Autobus Factory (RAF).

Following Latvian independence, Jelgava has slowly regained its original heritage and is now a popular tourist site. Owing to Latvia University of Life Sciences and Technologies, many of Jelgava's inhabitants are students or people connected with education. For this reason Jelgava is sometimes called the Student capital of Latvia.

== Climate ==
Jelgava has a humid continental climate (Köppen Dfb).

Climate data for Jelgava (1991−2020 normals, extremes 1867−present)
Month	Jan	Feb	Mar	Apr	May	Jun	Jul	Aug	Sep	Oct	Nov	Dec	Year
Record high °C (°F)	10.7 (51.3)	13.5 (56.3)	19.7 (67.5)	27.4 (81.3)	30.0 (86.0)	32.8 (91.0)	36.0 (96.8)	33.7 (92.7)	30.1 (86.2)	23.4 (74.1)	17.0 (62.6)	11.6 (52.9)	36.0 (96.8)
Mean daily maximum °C (°F)	−0.3 (31.5)	0.3 (32.5)	4.9 (40.8)	12.4 (54.3)	18.1 (64.6)	21.3 (70.3)	23.9 (75.0)	23.1 (73.6)	17.8 (64.0)	10.8 (51.4)	4.8 (40.6)	1.1 (34.0)	11.5 (52.7)
Daily mean °C (°F)	−2.7 (27.1)	−2.7 (27.1)	0.7 (33.3)	6.7 (44.1)	12.0 (53.6)	15.5 (59.9)	17.9 (64.2)	17.0 (62.6)	12.3 (54.1)	6.9 (44.4)	2.5 (36.5)	−0.9 (30.4)	7.1 (44.8)
Mean daily minimum °C (°F)	−5.7 (21.7)	−6.2 (20.8)	−3.6 (25.5)	1.1 (34.0)	5.1 (41.2)	8.9 (48.0)	11.6 (52.9)	10.8 (51.4)	7.0 (44.6)	2.9 (37.2)	−0.1 (31.8)	−3.6 (25.5)	2.4 (36.3)
Record low °C (°F)	−34.5 (−30.1)	−34.9 (−30.8)	−30.1 (−22.2)	−14.2 (6.4)	−5.3 (22.5)	−1.1 (30.0)	2.8 (37.0)	0.3 (32.5)	−6.4 (20.5)	−10.1 (13.8)	−22.4 (−8.3)	−32.2 (−26.0)	−34.9 (−30.8)
Average precipitation mm (inches)	43.6 (1.72)	34.8 (1.37)	33.8 (1.33)	36.0 (1.42)	52.4 (2.06)	73.4 (2.89)	82.1 (3.23)	69.4 (2.73)	59.9 (2.36)	68.2 (2.69)	50.4 (1.98)	47.1 (1.85)	651.1 (25.63)
Average precipitation days	11	9	9	7	9	10	11	10	10	11	11	11	119
Average relative humidity (%)	87.5	84.9	78.5	71.4	70.5	74.5	77.9	78.7	83.1	86.6	89.4	89.6	81.0
Source 1: LVĢMC
Source 2: NOAA (humidity and precipitation days 1991-2020)

== Demographics ==
As of 1 January 2022, the city had a population of 54,694.

Demographics of Jelgava 2022
Latvians	60.1%
Russians	26.8%
Belarusians	4.8%
Ukrainians	2.3%
Poles	1.7%
Lithuanians	1.3%
Others	3%

== Sights ==
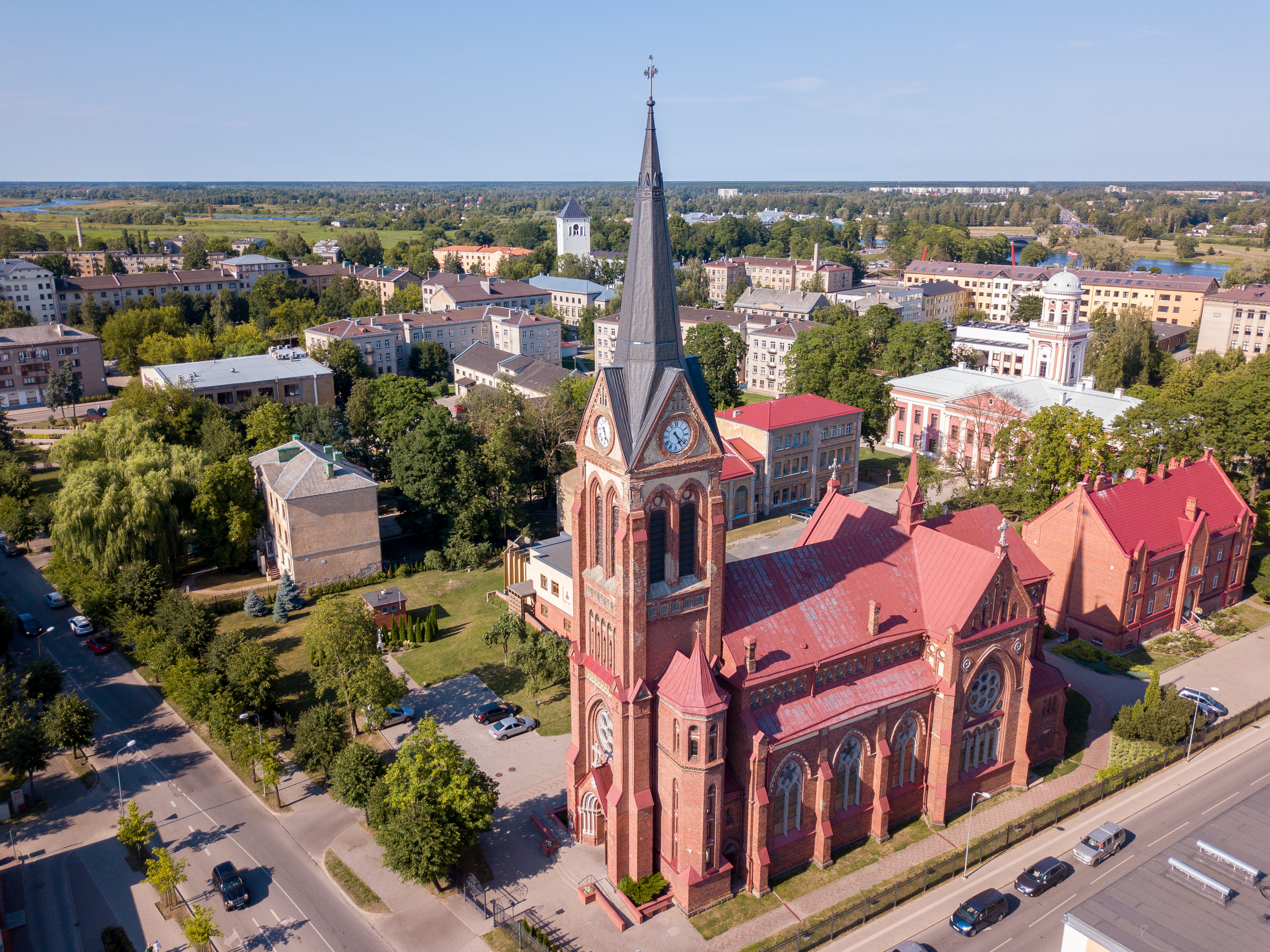
Cathedral of Our Lady

Jelgava before the Second World War had regular, broad streets lined with the mansions of the Baltic German nobility who resided at the former capital of Courland. The old castle (1266) of the dukes of Courland, situated on an island in the river, was destroyed by Duke Biren, who had a spacious palace erected (1738–1772) by Bartolomeo Rastrelli at the bridge across the Lielupe. The palace contains the sarcophagi of almost all of the Curonian dukes, except the last one. The future Louis XVIII sojourned in the palace between 1798 and 1800. It now functions as Latvia University of Life Sciences and Technologies. Other landmarks include the Baroque church of St. Anne's Church (Liela Street 22a), the tower of the destroyed Jelgava St. Trinity Church (Akadēmijas Street 1), and two handsome structures: the Villa Medem and the Academia Petrina.

In addition the following cultural and historical objects can be seen: Jelgava Palace (Lielā Street 2), Jelgava Old Town, Cathedral of the Immaculate Virgin Mary (Katoļu Street 11), St Simeon and St Anne's Cathedral (Raina Street 5), St. John's Church (Jāņa Street 1), Jelgava Baptist Church (Matera Street 54), Love Alley (Dobele highway), Valdeka Castle (Rīgas Street 22), Jelgava Station (Stacijas Street 1).

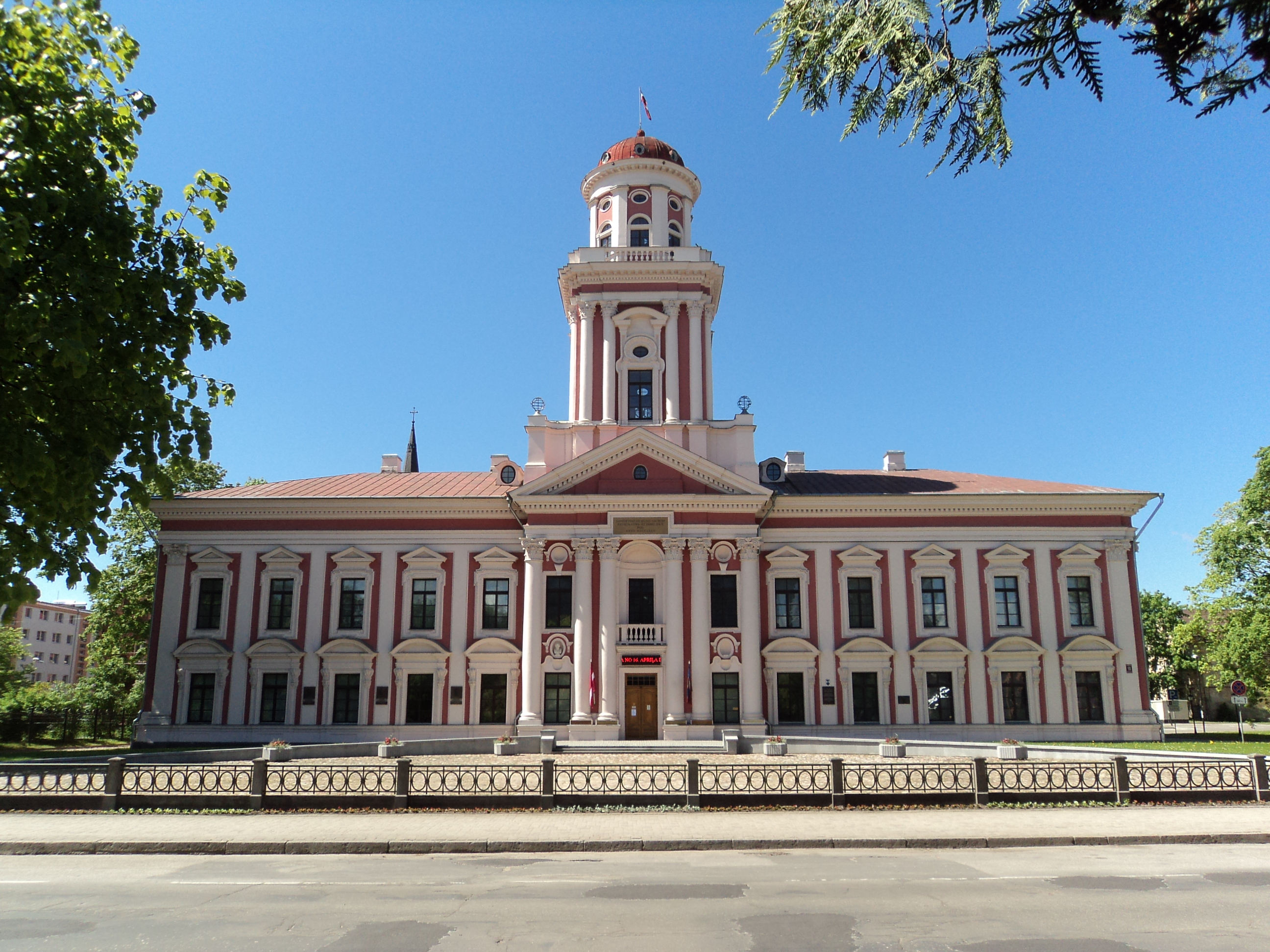
Academia Petrina

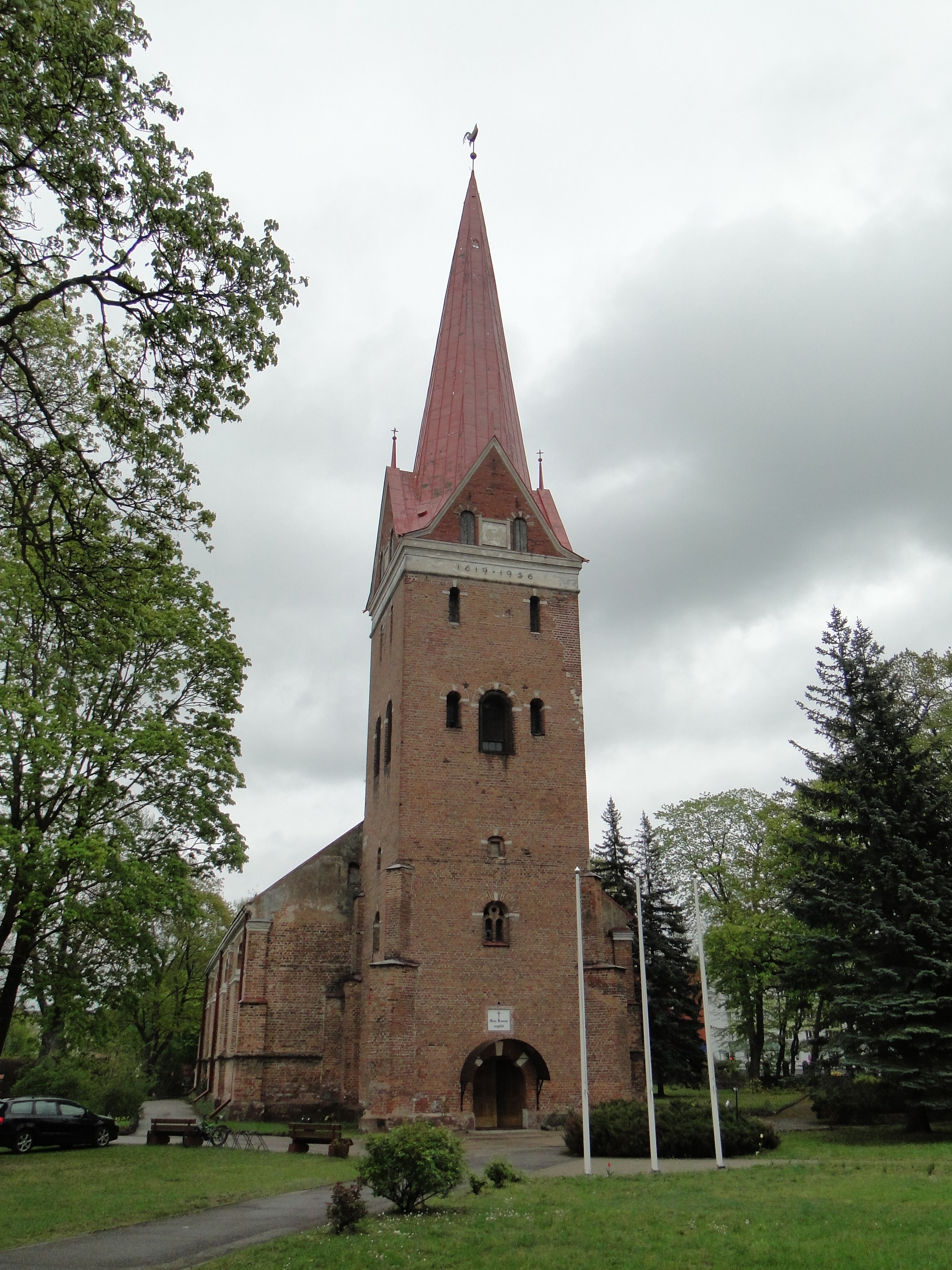
St. Anne's Church

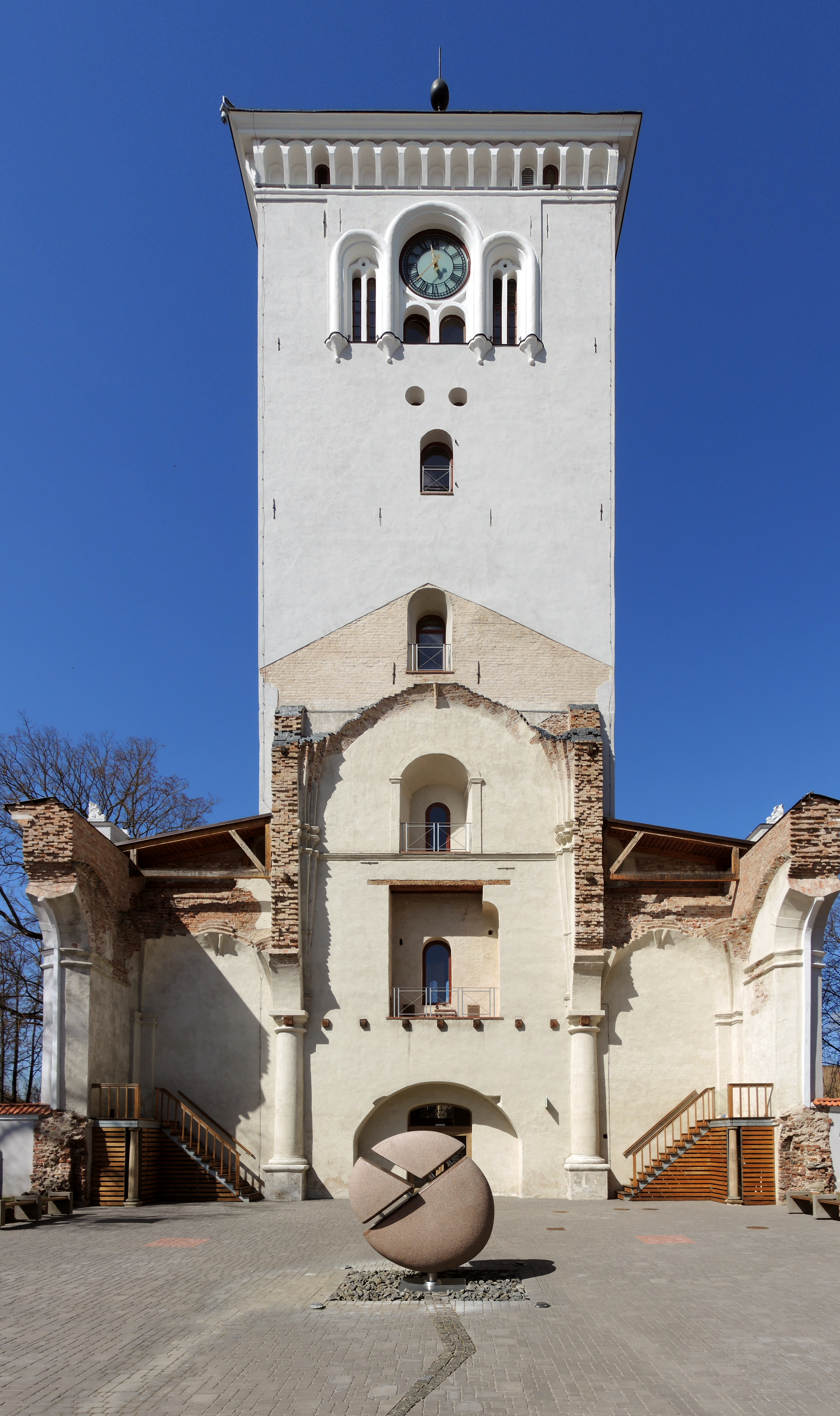
Destroyed Jelgava St. Trinity Church

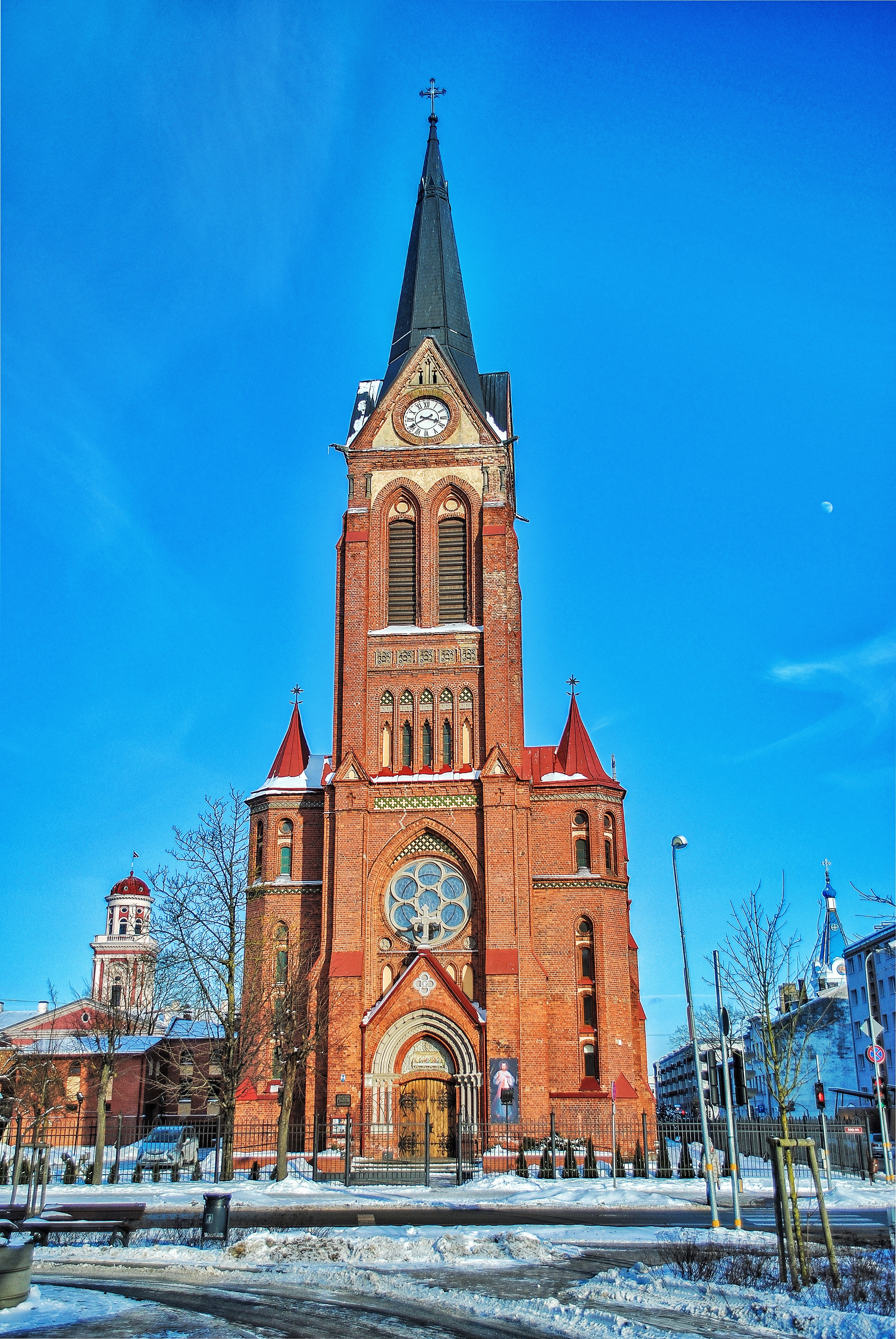
Cathedral of the Immaculate Virgin Mary

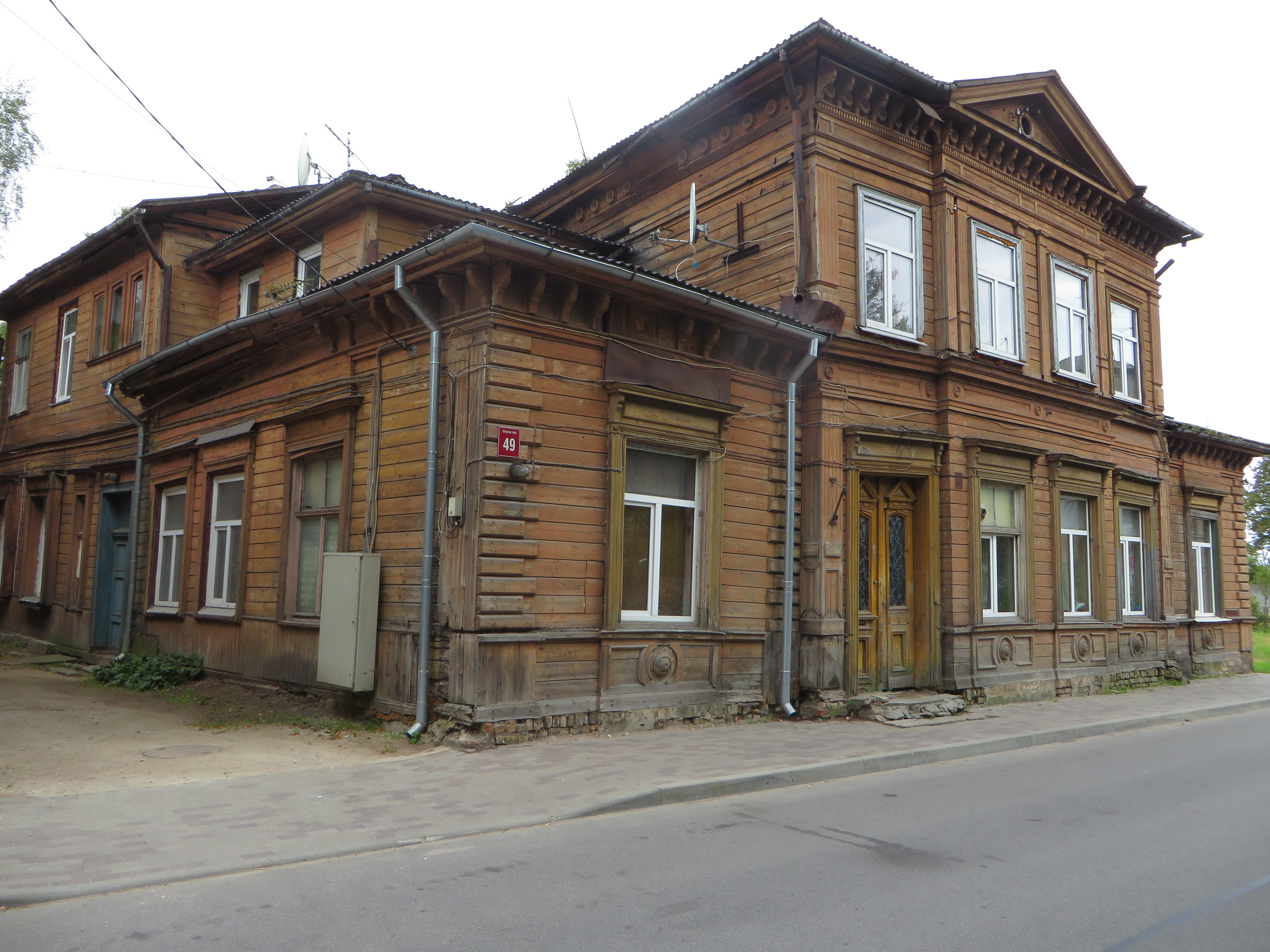
19th-century wooden building on Uzvaras street 49

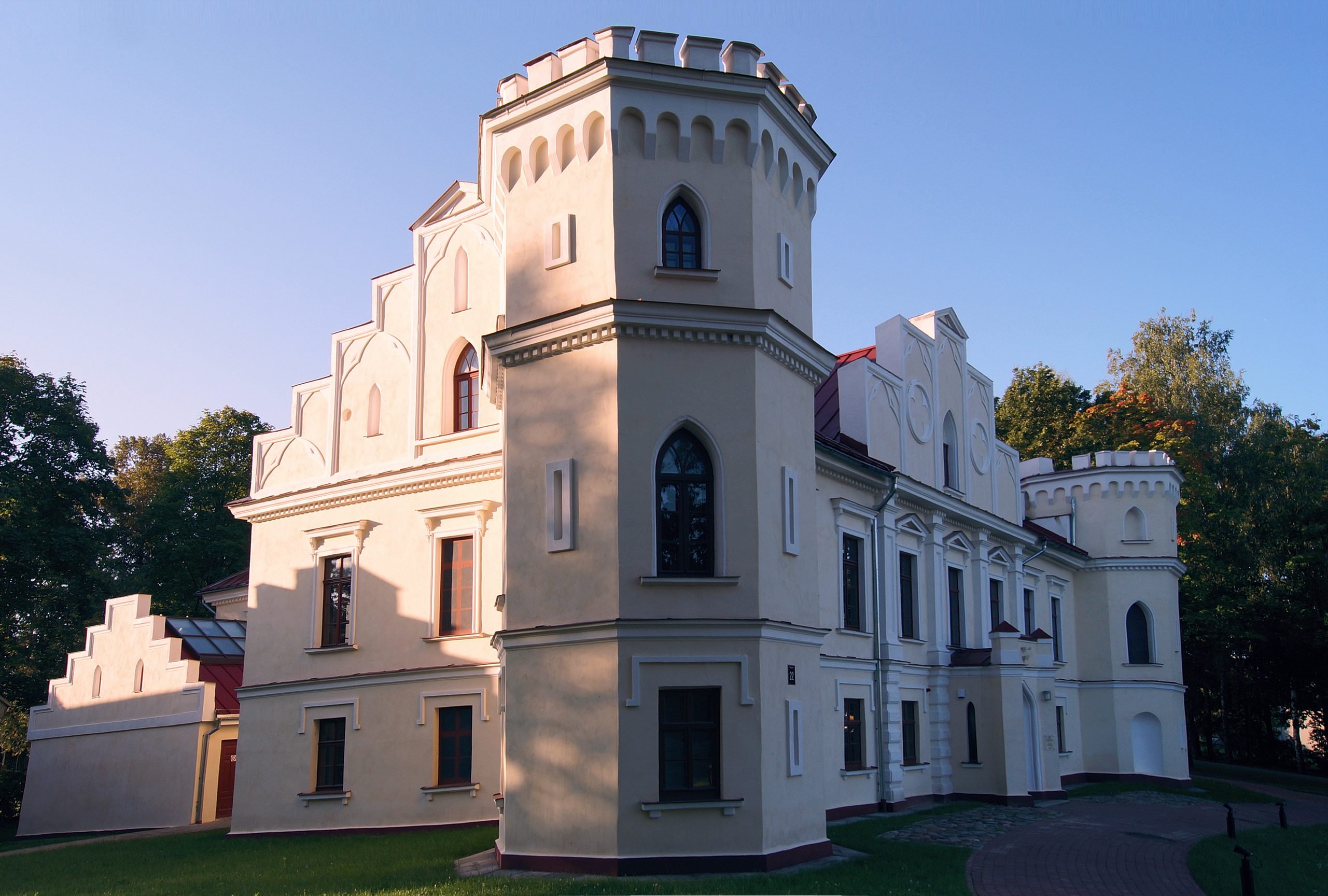
Valdeka palace

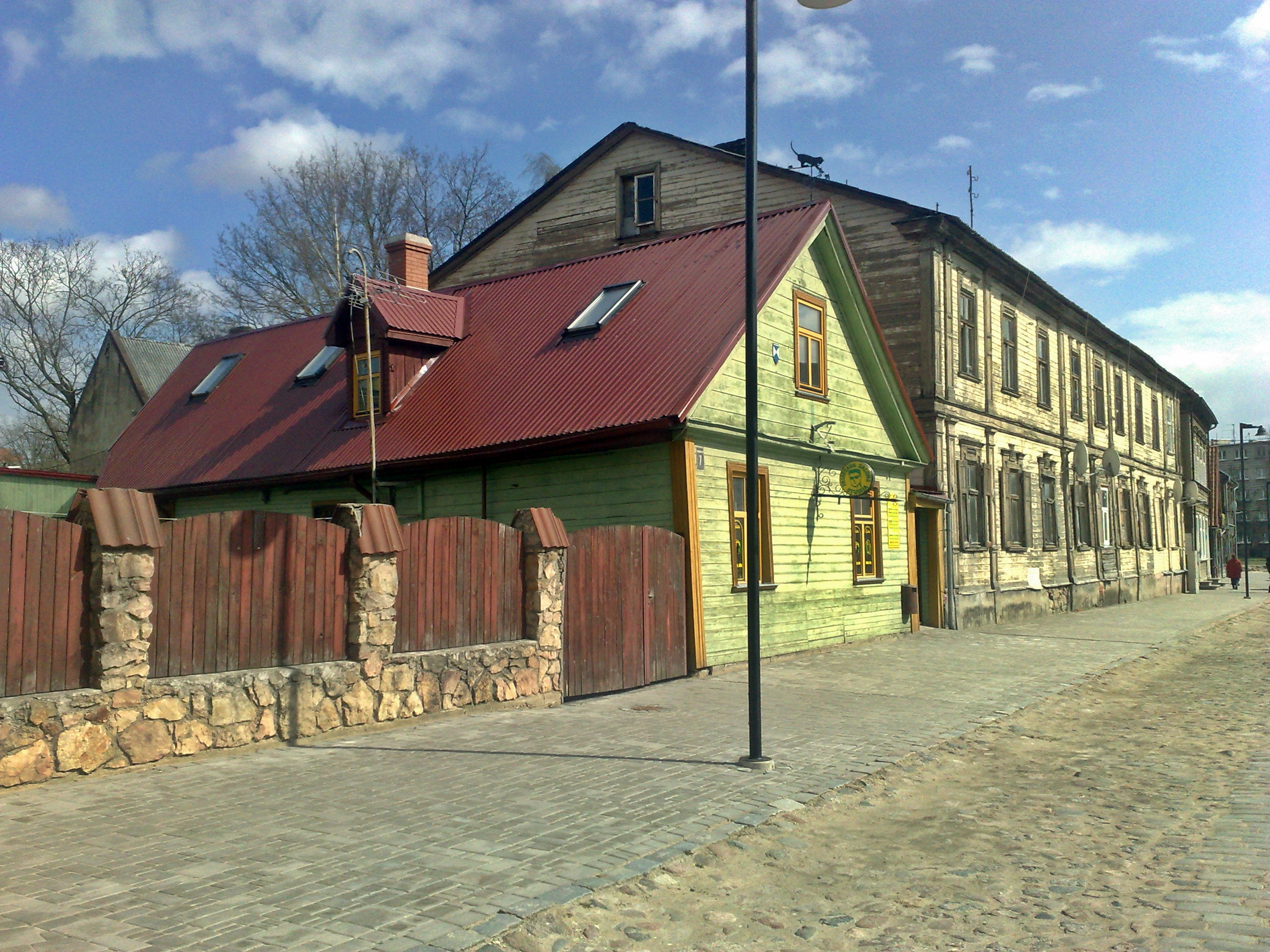
Part of a preserved 18–19th-century wooden architecture around Vecpilsētas street.

== Culture ==
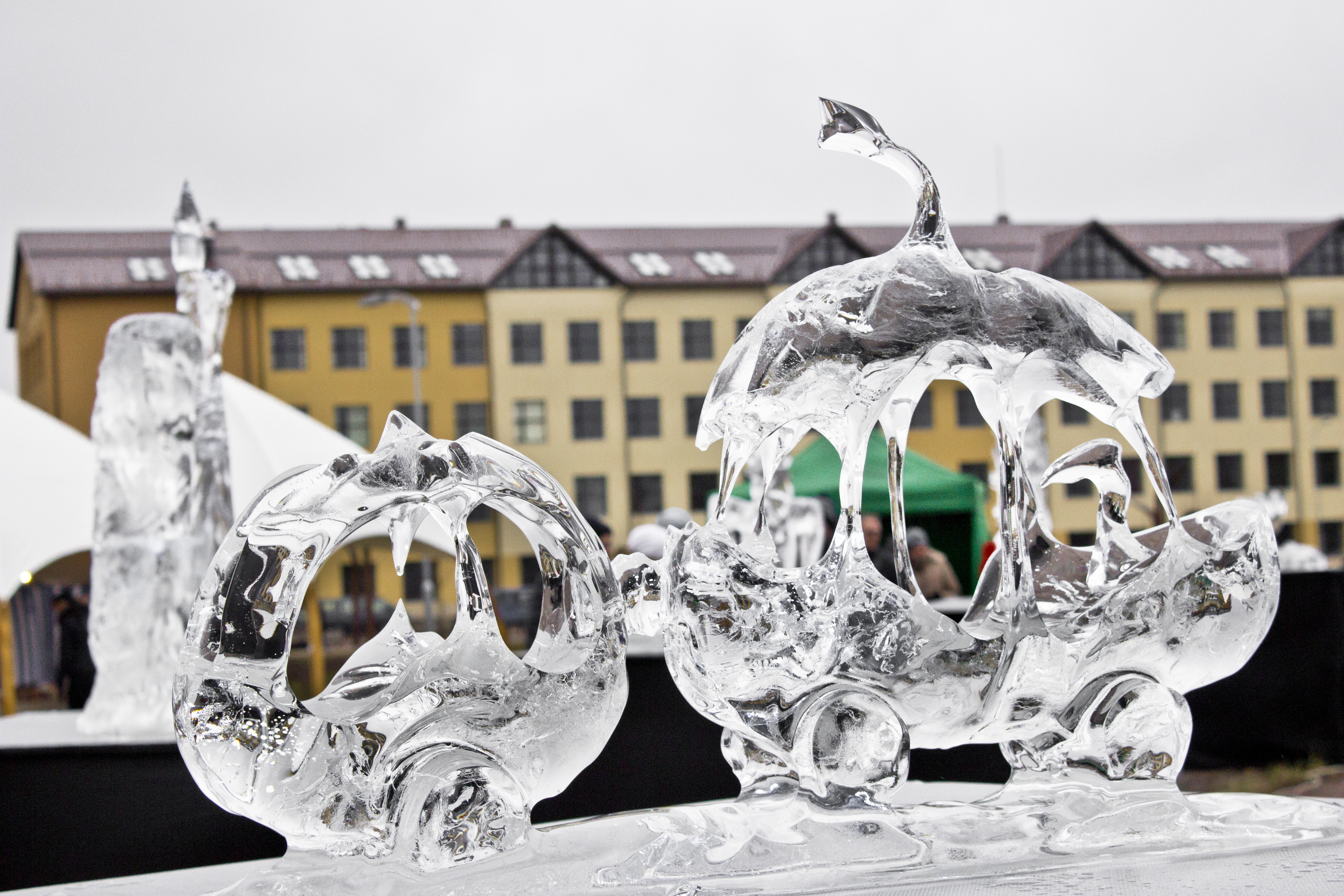
Ice sculpture festival

Jelgava regularly hosts an international Ice Sculpture festival, Student Folk Festival, Easter Walk, Latvian Plant Days, Business Days, Jelgava City Festival, Summer solstice in Jelgava, medicine market, International Cat Show "Jelgava Cat", Sports Day, International Sand Sculpture Festival, Latvian Milk, Bread and Honey Festival and Milk Packet Boat Regatta, Beginning of the School Year, Metal Festival, Azemitologa Festival, Autumn fair " Miķeļdienas waiting", Latvian Amateur Theater Festival "Jokes come from the actor", Student Days, Proclamation Day of the Republic of Latvia s celebrations, New Year's Eve.

The following museums operate in the city: Ģederts Eliass Jelgava History and Art Museum, Adolf Alunan Memorial Museum, historical expositions St. Trinity Church tower, Latvia University of Agriculture Museum, Rundāle Castle museum exposition in Jelgava Castle "Tombs of the Dukes of Kurzeme and Zemgale", Latvian Railway Museum Jelgava exposition, psychiatric hospitals "Ģintermuiža" museum, Firefighter exposition.

Libraries: Jelgava City Library (Akadēmijas Street 26), Pārlielupe Library (Loka highway 17), Miezīte Library (Dobele highway 100), children's library "Zinītis" (Lielā Street 15).

== Parks ==
Green territories and parks: Jelgava Castle Park, Station Park, Rainis Park, Duke Jacob's Square, Square in Mātera Street, Alunāns Park, Svētbirze, Ozolpils Park, Valdeka Park, Ozolskers, Victory Park, Jelgava Psychoneurological Hospital Park, Lielupe floodplain meadows, Grēbner Park, forest near RAF residential area, forest near Jelgava bypass.

== Sports ==
The city's main football team, FK Jelgava, plays in the Latvian Higher League and has won the Latvian Football Cup four times.

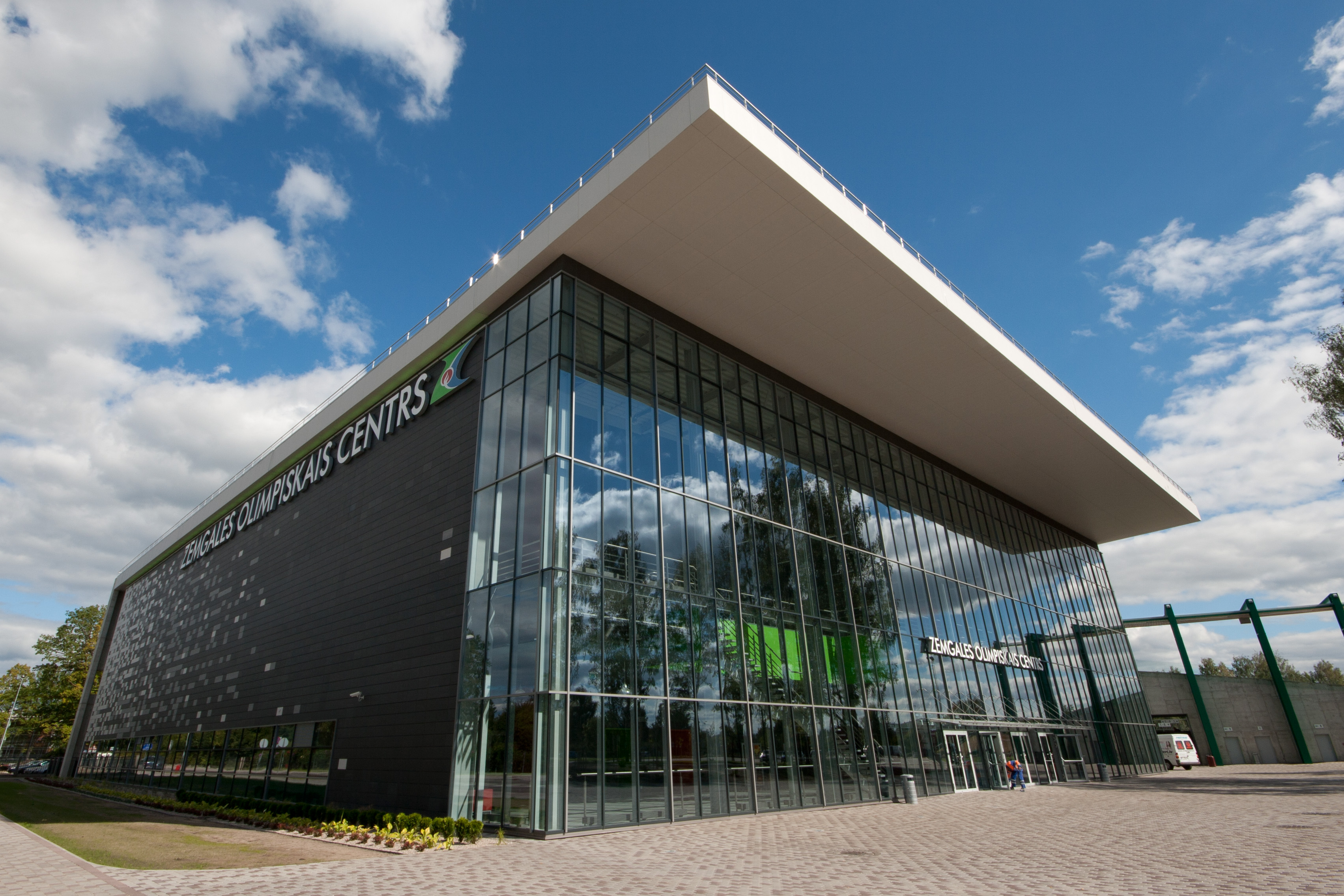
Zemgale Olympic Center

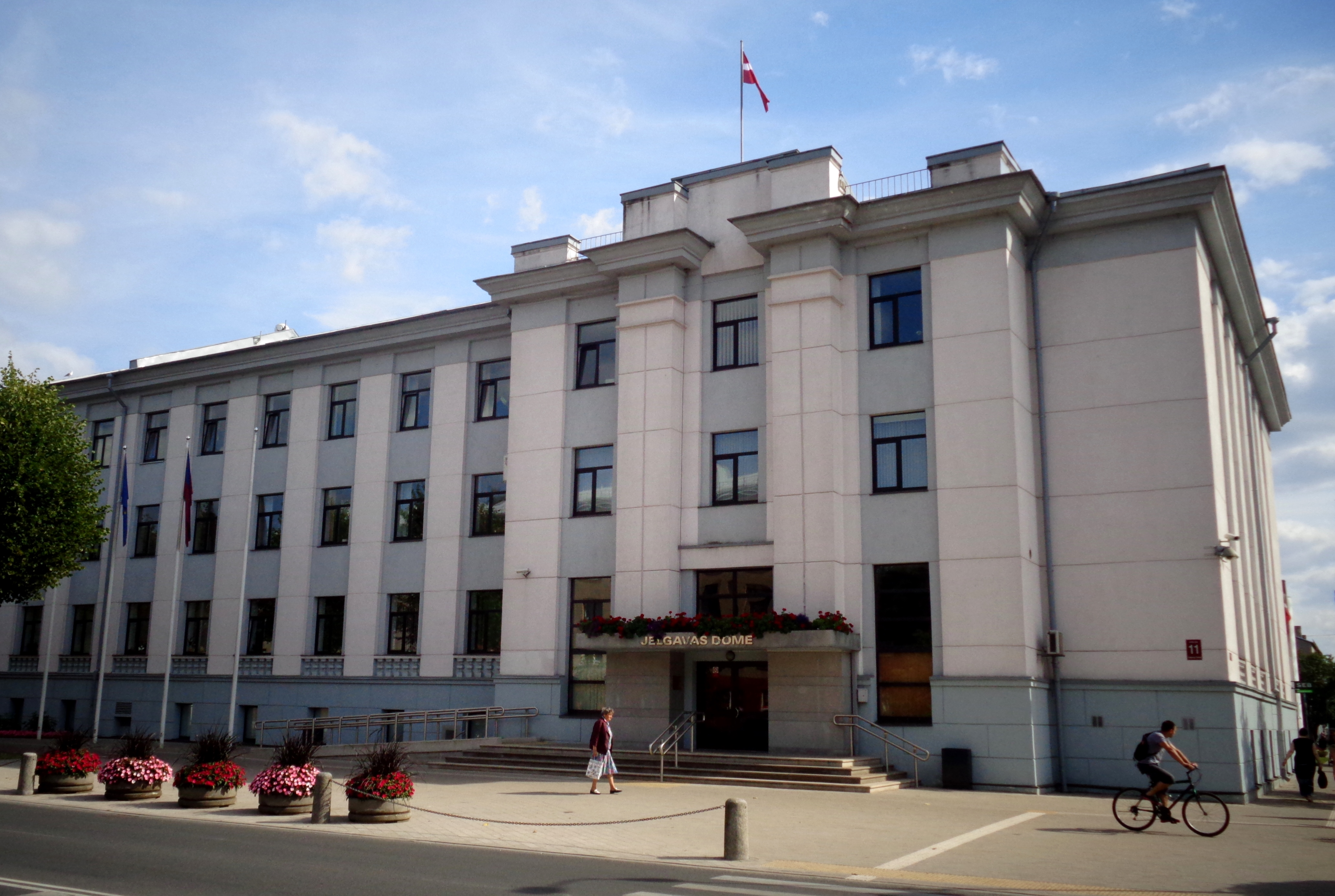
Town Hall of Jelgava, Latvia

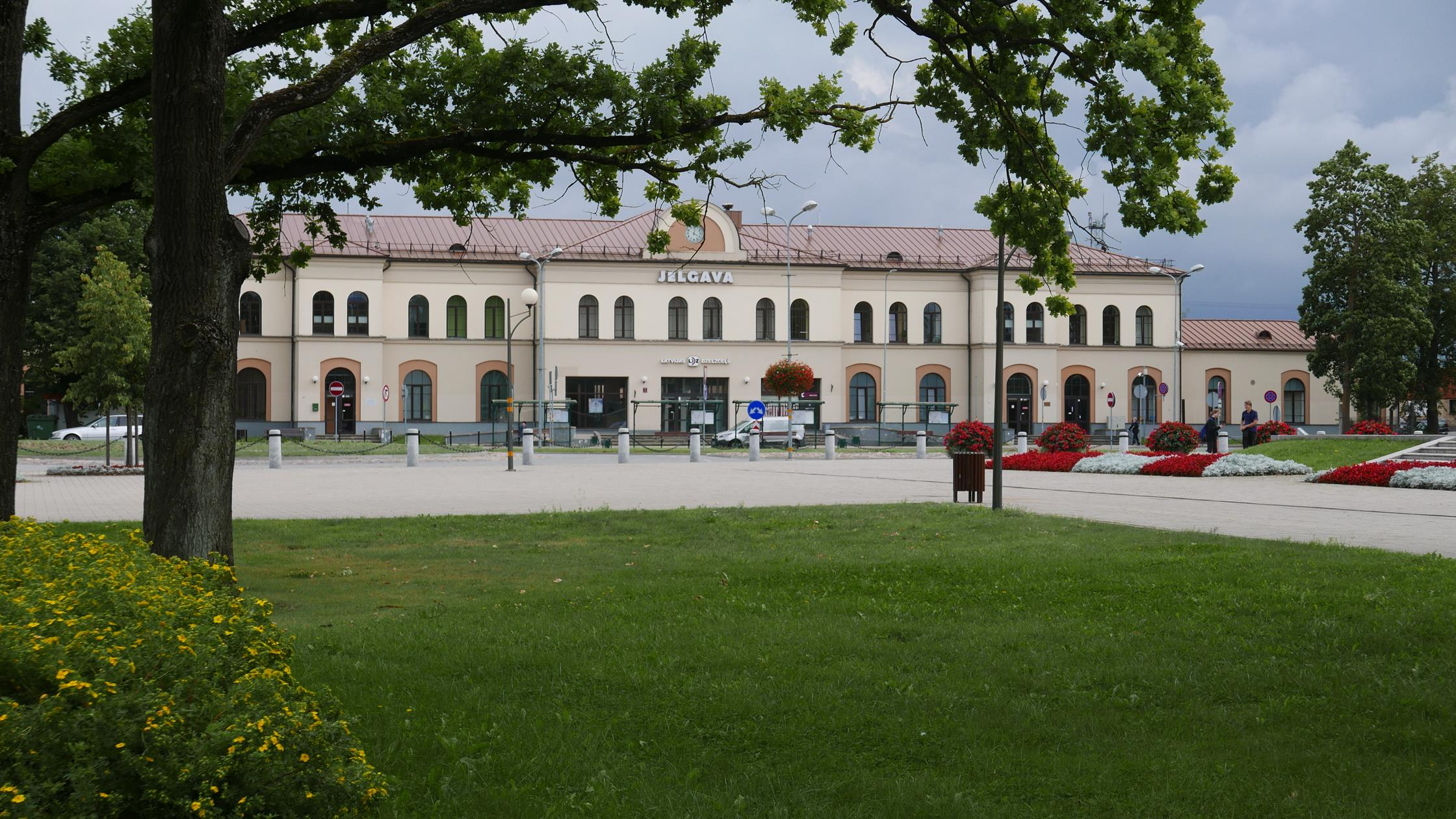
Jelgava Railway Station

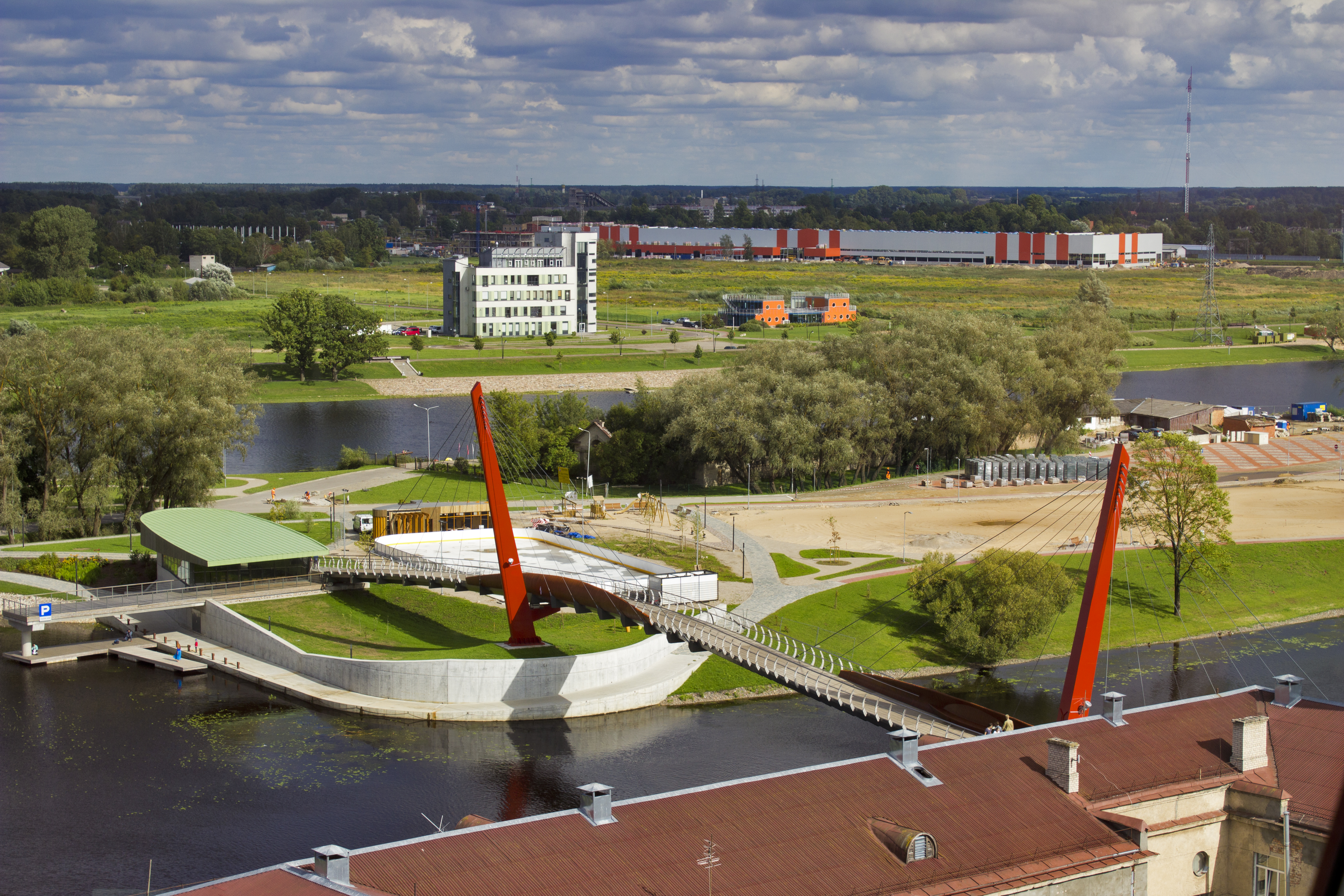
Pedestrian bridge over Driksa

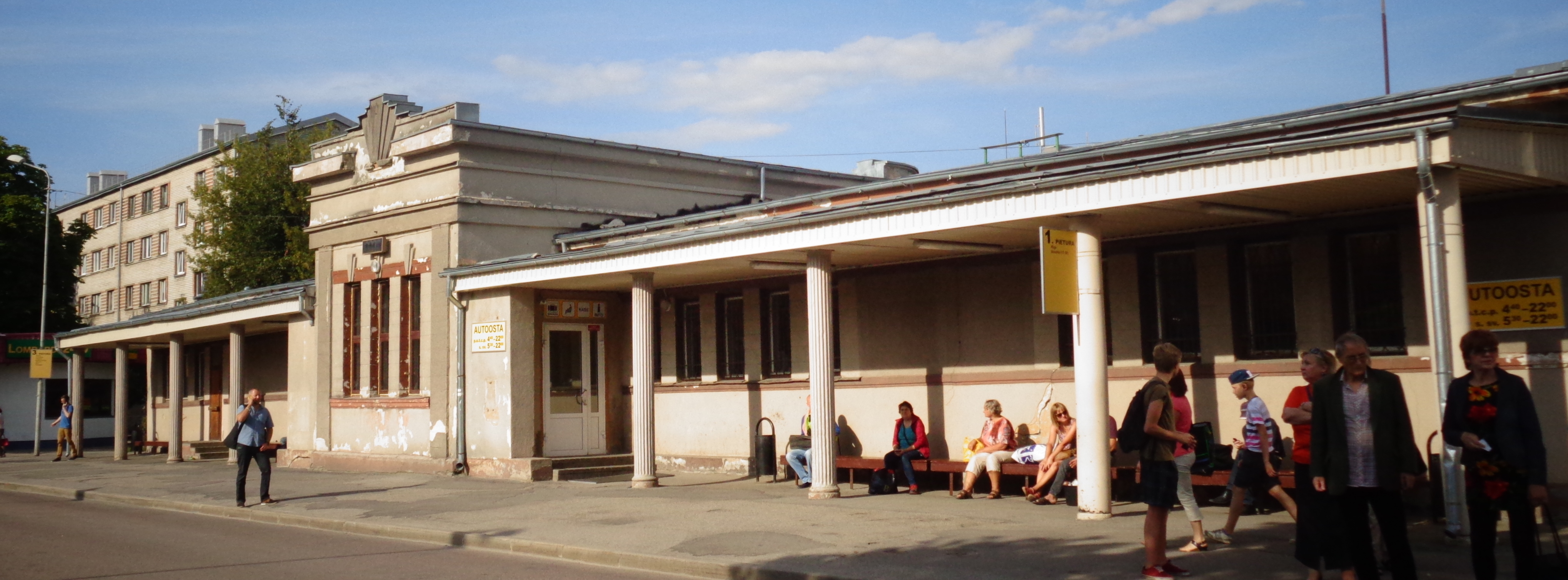
Bus station in Jelgava, Latvia

== Notable people ==
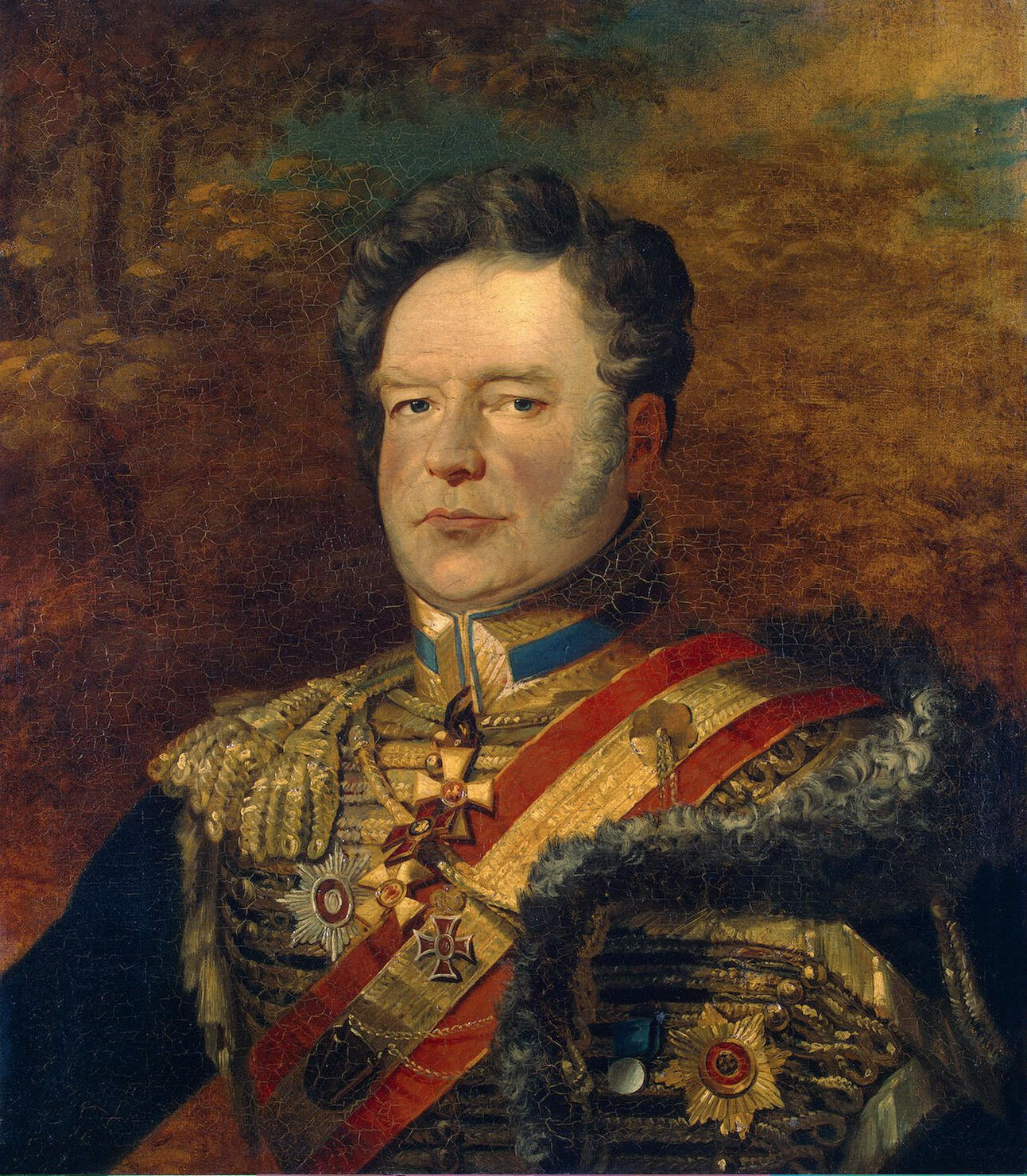
Friedrich von Rüdiger, portrait ca 1820

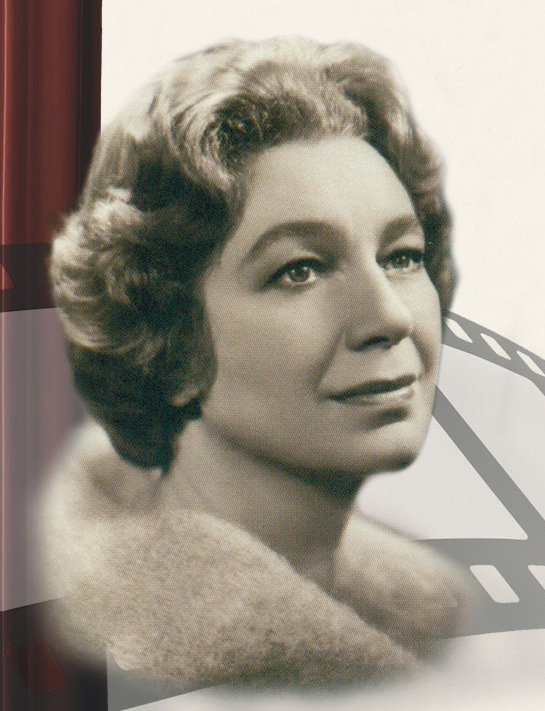
Elza Radziņa

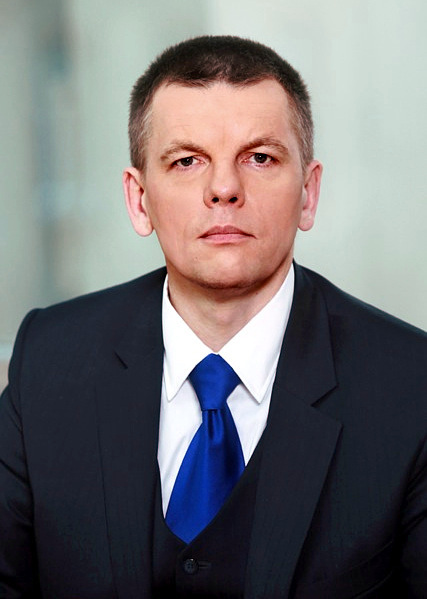
Einars Repse, 2013

- Maria Amalia of Courland (1653-1711), Landgravine of Hesse-Kassel
- Georg Friedrich von Kymmel (1749–1829), Baltic German merchant and politician, first mayor of Tartu
- Johann Heinrich Baumann (1753-1832), a Baltic German artist
- Johann Friedrich von Recke (1764-1846), public official in the Baltic German Duchy of Courland
- Friedrich Ludwig Lindner (1772-1845), German writer, journalist and physician
- Jan Krzysztof Damel (1780-1840), a Polish neoclassicist artist
- Friedrich von der Pahlen (1780-1863), a Baltic German diplomat and administrator.
- Princess Wilhelmine, Duchess of Sagan (1781-1839), Duchess of Sagan
- Princess Pauline, Duchess of Sagan (1782-1845), Duchess of Sagan, 1838 and 1845
- Friedrich von Rüdiger (1783-1856), Baltic German military officer, a general of the Imperial Russian Army.
- Karl Eichwald (1795-1876), a Baltic German geologist, paleontologist and physician.
- Adolph Theodor Kupffer (1799-1865), a Baltic German chemist, and physicist
- Paul von Medem (1800-1854), diplomat
- Ernst Rudolf von Trautvetter (1809-1889), a Baltic German botanist
- Eduard Totleben (1818–1884), a Baltic German Russian military engineer
- Carl Schmidt (1822-1894), a Baltic German chemist
- August Bielenstein (1826-1907), a Baltic German linguist, folklorist and ethnographer
- Elise von Jung-Stilling (1829-1904), painter and founder of a private painting school in Riga
- Johannes Engelmann (1832-1912), a Baltic German jurist
- Ādolfs Alunāns (1848–1912), an actor, director and playwright.
- Johann Walter-Kurau (1869-1932), a Baltic German painter
- Paul Schiemann (1876-1944), a Baltic German journalist, editor and politician
- Max Lazerson (1887-1951), politician, member of Saeima from 1922 to 1925 and again in 1928 to 1931.
- Mamert Stankiewicz (1889-1939), the captain of the Polish merchant marine
- Feodor Stepanovich Rojankovsky (1891-1970), a Russian émigré illustrator
- Joseph Hirshhorn (1899-1981), entrepreneur, financier and art collector
- Jānis Lipke (1900–1987), rescued Jews in Riga in World War II
- Elza Radziņa (1917-2005), a Latvian theater and cinema actress
- Vilnis Edvīns Bresis (1938-2017), politician
- Inese Vaidere (born 1952), politician, a Member of the European Parliament
- Einars Repše (born 1961), politician, 17th Prime Minister of Latvia
- Kaspars Gerhards (born 1969), politician, economy minister, 2007 to 2009,
- Artūrs Skrastiņš (born 1974), stage and film actor, long-standing member of the Dailes Theatre in Riga
- Renārs Kaupers (born 1974), Latvian pop/rock singer, instrumentalist and songwriter
- Kaspars Znotiņš (born 1975), stage and film actor
- Gunars Upatnieks (born 1983), musician, double-bass player and member of the Berlin Philharmonic.
- Edijs Jurēvics (born 1989), rock singer, guitarist, clarinetist, pianist and songwriter.

=== Dukes of Courland ===
- Friedrich Kettler (1569-1642), Duke of Courland, he ruled the eastern Semigallia portion and the entire duchy from 1617 onward
- Wilhelm Kettler (1574-1640), Duke of Courland, he ruled the western Courland portion
- Jacob Kettler (1610–1682), the Duke of Courland and Semigallia from 1642 to 1682 (born in Kuldīga)
- Frederick Casimir Kettler (1650-1698), the Duke of Courland and Semigallia from 1682 to 1698.
- Ferdinand Kettler (1655-1737), the Duke of Courland and Semigallia from 1730 to 1737
- Frederick William, Duke of Courland (1692-1711), the Duke of Courland and Semigallia from 1698 to 1711.
- Anna of Russia (1693–1740), lived locally and served as regent of the Duchy of Courland and Semigallia from 1711 until 1730
- Peter von Biron (1724-1800), the last duke of Courland and Semigallia from 1769 to 1795
- Charles, Duke of Courland (1733–1796), a German prince and the Duke of Courland and Semigallia from 1758 to 1763.

=== Sport ===
- Carl Friedrich Schmid (1840–1897), a Baltic German chess player.
- Hildegarde Švarce-Gešela (1907–1944), figure skater. competed in the mixed pairs at the 1936 Winter Olympics
- Aleksejs Auziņš (1910-1997), football midfielder, manager and an ice hockey player.
- Jānis Vītols (1911–1993), cyclist, competed in the road race events at the 1936 Summer Olympics
- Visvaldis Melderis (1915–1944), basketball player competed at the 1936 Summer Olympics
- Jānis Lūsis (1939-2020), Latvian and Soviet javelin thrower, competed at the 1972 Summer Olympics
- Dzintars Lācis (1940-1992), cyclist, competed at the 1964 and 1968 Summer Olympics
- Dans Jansons (born 1966), freestyle skier, competed at the 1992 Winter Olympics
- Igors Šaplavskis (born 1968), boxer, competed at the 1992 Summer Olympics
- Natalia Laschenova (born 1973), gymnast, competed at the 1988 Summer Olympics
- Agnese Ozoliņa (born 1979), sprint freestyle swimmer. competed in the 1996 and 2000 and the 2004 Summer Olympics
- Intars Spalviņš (born 1980), cross-country skier. competed in the men's sprint event at the 2006 Winter Olympics
- Ingrīda Priede (born 1981), track and field Paralympic athlete, who competes in the discus throw and shot put
- Andrejs Dūda (born 1981), swimmer, competed at the 2008 Summer Olympics
- Guntars Deičmans (born 1983), swimmer, competed at the 2004 Summer Olympics
- Vitālijs Samoļins (born 1990), chess player, Latvian Chess Champion in 2009 and 2012.
- Katrīna Amerika (born 1991). chess player, women's Latvian Chess Champion in 2014
- Gatis Sprukts (born 1996), ice hockey player
- Olga Jakušina (born 1997), ice dancer

== Twin towns – sister cities ==
Jelgava is twinned with:

- Pärnu, Estonia (1957)
- Šiauliai, Lithuania (1960)
- Vejle, Denmark (1992)
- Białystok, Poland (1994)
- Xinying (Tainan), Taiwan (2000)
- Alcamo, Italy (2002)
- Hällefors, Sweden (2004)
- Nacka, Sweden (2004)
- Rueil-Malmaison, France (2006)
- Ivano-Frankivsk, Ukraine (2007)
- Nova Odessa, Brazil (2007)
- Como, Italy (2016)
- Carmel, United States (2022)

In 2022, Jelgava suspended the cooperation agreements with Magadan and Baranavichy due to Russian invasion of Ukraine.

== See also ==
- Adolfa Alunāna Theatre
- Duchy of Courland and Semigallia
