= Cathedral of the Immaculate Virgin Mary, Jelgava =

Church building in Latvia

Coordinates: 56.6492°N 23.7272°E

Cathedral of the Immaculate Virgin Mary
- Jelgavas Bezvainīgās Jaunavas Marijas Romas katoļu katedrāle
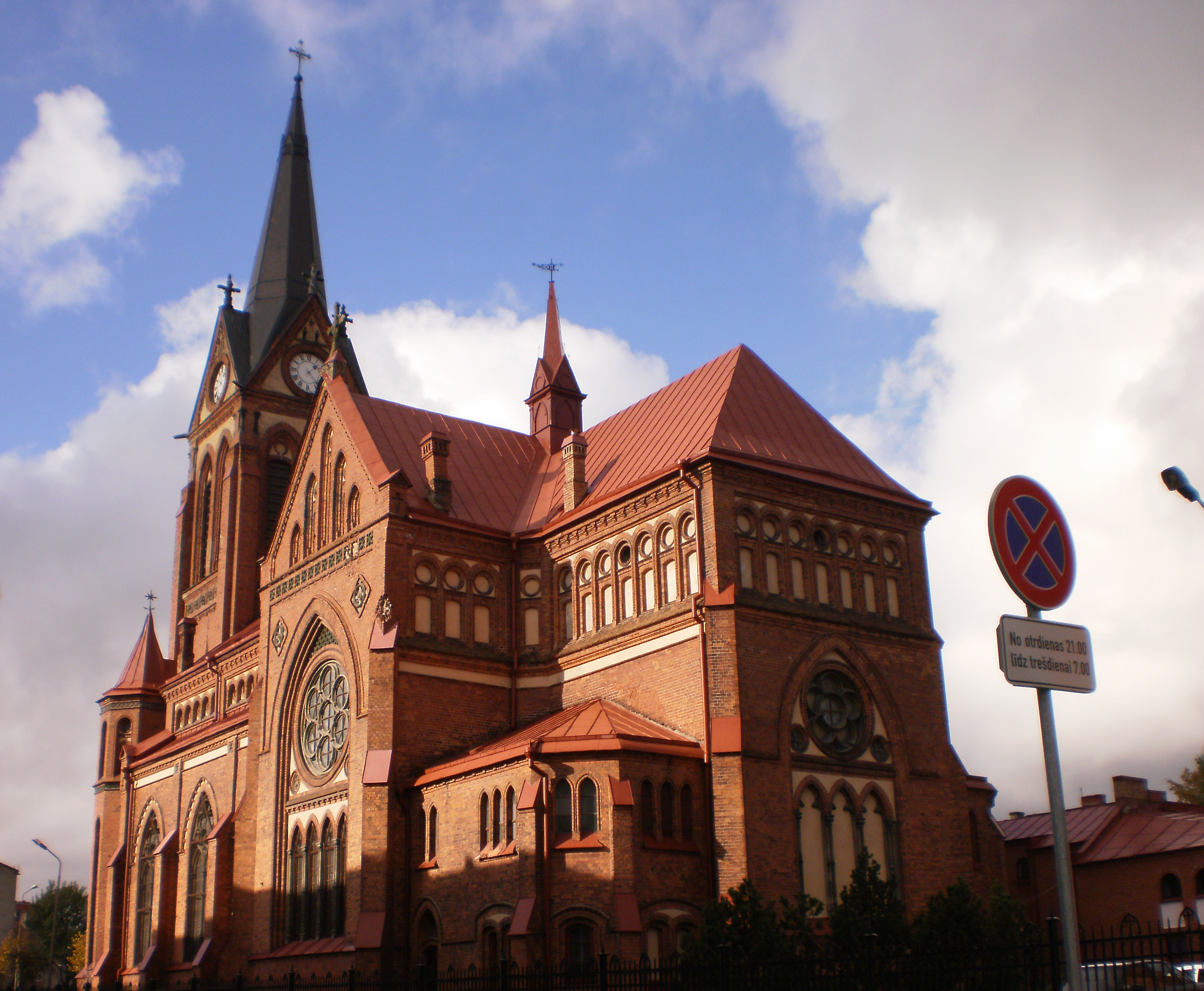
- Cathedral of the Immaculate Virgin Mary
- Location: Jelgava
- Country: Latvia
- Denomination: Roman Catholic Church

History
- Consecrated: 1906. Reconsecrated in 1925.

Architecture
- Architect: Carl Strandmann
- Style: Neo Gothic
- Groundbreaking: 1902
- Completed: 1906

Cathedral of the Immaculate Virgin Mary or the Cathedral of Our Lady (Latvian: Jelgavas Bezvainīgās Jaunavas Marijas Romas katoļu katedrāle) is the cathedral church of the Diocese of Jelgava, is located in Jelgava, Latvia.

== History ==
The previous church, demolished in 1904 due to risk of collapse, dates from 1630. The new church was built in 1906 and designed by Carl Strandmann and consecrated in honor of St. George. In 1925, Bishop Jāzeps Rancāns re-consecrated the church to the Immaculate Virgin. During World War II, in July 1944, the church burned. After the war the restoration of the church began using as building materials the building blocks of previous walls. The works lasted until 1958. Further restoration work and interior finishing were completed in 1969. With the creation of the Diocese of Jelgava on December 2, 1995, in the Apostolicum ministerium Bula of Pope John Paul II, the church was elevated to cathedral status.

== See also ==
- Roman Catholicism in Latvia
- St. Mary's Cathedral (disambiguation)
