= St Mary's Cathedral, West Ealing =

St Mary's Cathedral, London
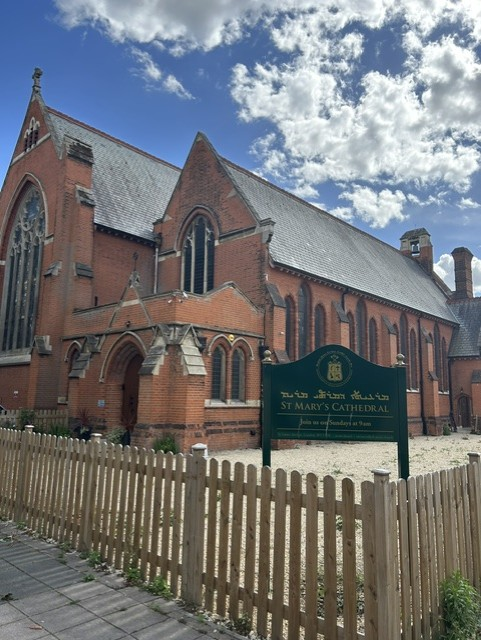
- St Mary's Cathedral, West Ealing
- Interactive fullscreen map
- 51.508946°N 0.326517°W
- Location: St James' Avenue, West Ealing, London
- Country: England
- Language(s): Assyrian & English
- Denomination: Assyrian Church of the East, previously Anglican

History
- Status: Cathedral
- Consecrated: 15 February 2025

Architecture
- Functional status: Active
- Architect: William Pywell
- Groundbreaking: 1903
- Completed: 1909

Specifications
- Materials: Red brick with stone dressings

Administration
- Diocese: Diocese of Western Europe

Clergy
- Bishop: HG Mar Awraham Youkhanis
- Priest: Rev Fr Tony Malham

The Cathedral Church of Saint Mary is a cathedral of the Assyrian Church of the East, located in West Ealing area of the London Borough of Ealing, England. It is based over two sites on St James Avenue and Canberra Road.

The Cathedral serves as the seat of the Bishop of the Diocese of Western Europe serving the Assyrian community.

The Church building previously served as the Anglican parish of St James' Church, which closed in 2018. Following its acquisition and renovation, the cathedral was consecrated on 15 February 2025.

== History ==
=== Anglican parish (1903-2018) ===
The building was originally known as St James' Church, an Anglican parish up until 2018. The building was originally designed by William Pywell (1859-1924), and built 1903-1909.

=== Assyrian Cathedral (2025-present) ===
The Assyrian Cathedral moved from its previous, smaller location on Westminster Road in Hanwell, London to St James' Avenue. The church building was consecrated as a cathedral by His Grace Mar Awraham Youkhanis on 15 February 2025.

== Architecture ==
=== Exterior ===
The exterior of the building was constructed primarily of red brick accentuated by decorative stone dressings.

=== Interior ===
The interior and the liturgical alterations of the cathedral underwent a significant structural and liturgical reconfiguration following its acquisition by the Assyrian Church of the East. In standard Anglican design, the interior layout was organised with chancel and main altar positioned at the east end of the nave.

The orientation of the sanctuary was reversed to meet the theological requirements of Assyrian worship: the original Anglican chancel at the east end was converted into a raised platform area, while the primary altar was relocated to the west end of the building, enclosed by a traditional sanctuary screen to accommodate the church's distinct liturgical practices.

== See also ==
- Assyrian Church of the East
- East Syriac Rite
- Grade I and II* listed buildings in the London Borough of Ealing
- List of cathedrals in the United Kingdom
