= Latvian Bishops' Conference =

Assembly of Catholic bishops

Latvian Bishops' Conference (Latvian: Latvijas Bīskapu konference) is the national Roman Catholic Bishops' Conference in Latvia. It is headquartered in Riga and is a member of the Council of European Episcopal Conferences (CCEE) and the Commission of the Bishops' Conferences of the European Community (COMECE). It was founded as coordinator of the Latvian bishops on 15 November 1997, and held its inaugural meeting on 29 June 1998, starting off with a Pontifical High Mass in the Basilica of the Assumption in Aglona. Its first president was Cardinal Jānis Pujats, then archbishop of Riga.

The statutes, structure and functioning of the Bishops' Conference are based on the documents of the Second Vatican Council enshrined in the Code of Canon Law (CIC) Art. 447 ff of 1983. Other members are:

- Zbigņevs Stankevičs, archbishop of Riga
- Jānis Pujats, retired archbishop of Riga
- Jānis Cakuls, retired Auxiliary Bishop of Riga
- Vilhelms Lapelis, Bishop Emeritus (retired) of Liepāja
- Edvards Pavlovskis, bishop of Jelgava
- Antons Justs, bishop emeritus of Jelgava
- Jānis Bulis, bishop of Rēzekne-Aglona and current conference president
- Viktors Stulpins bishop of Liepāja

== See also ==
- Roman Catholicism in Latvia
