= Christ the King Church, Riga =

Church building in Riga, Latvia

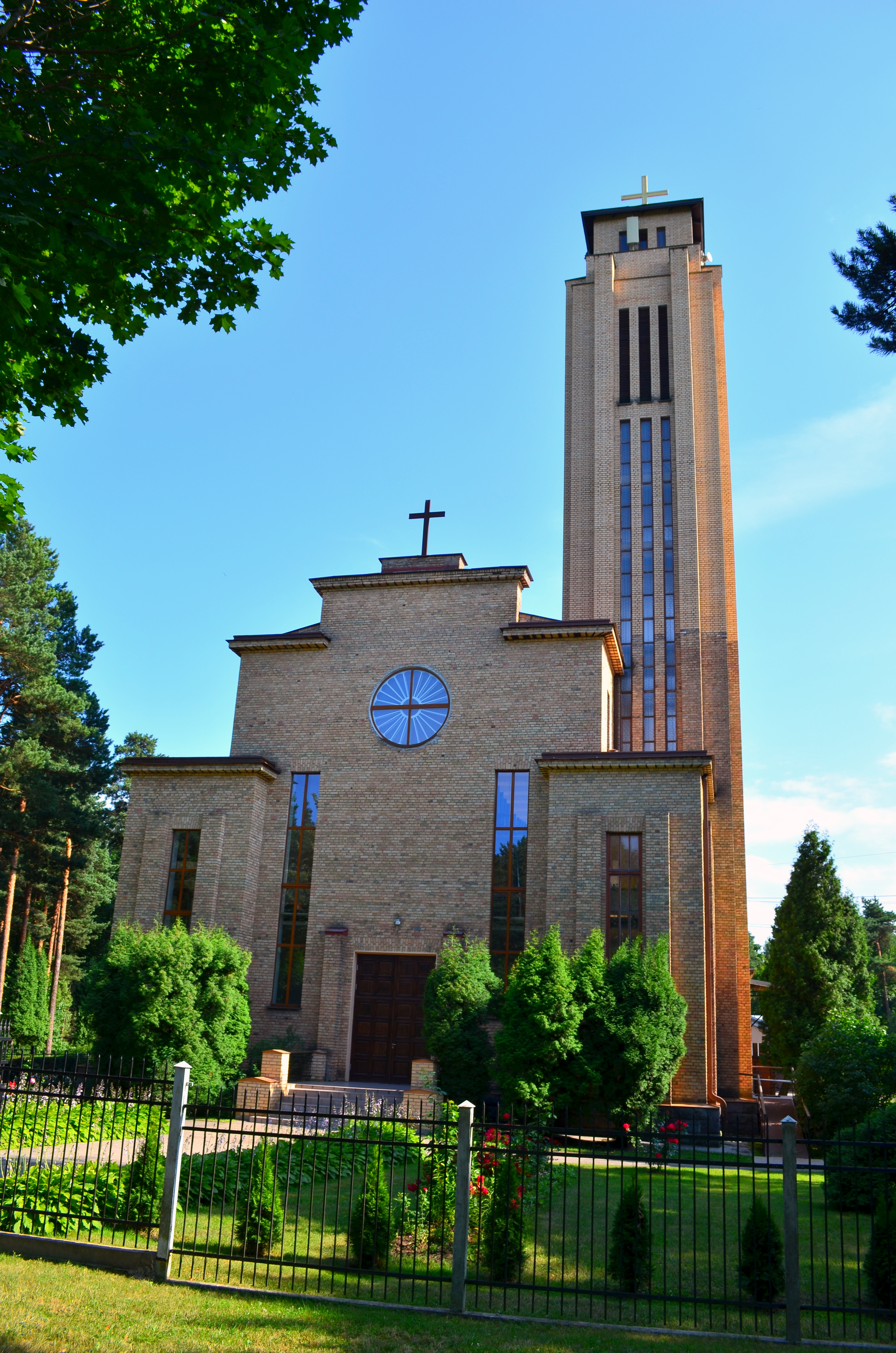
- Christ the King Church in 2013

- Location within Latvia Location within Europe

Religion
- Affiliation: Roman Catholicism
- Diocese: Diocese of Riga
- Year consecrated: 1943

Location
- Location: Meža prospekts 86, Riga, Latvia
- Interactive map of Christ the King Church, Riga
- Coordinates: 56°59′46″N 24°08′14″E

Architecture
- Architect: Indriķis Blankenburgs
- Type: Church
- Style: Functionalism
- Completed: 1942 (Tower added only in 2003-2004)
- Materials: Brick

Christ the King Church (Latvian: Kristus Karaļa Romas katoļu baznīca) is a catholic church in Riga, the capital of Latvia. The church is situated at the address 86 Meža Prospect. Originally built between 1935 and 1942, construction of the church was interrupted by World War II. The building was consecrated by Metropolitan Archbishop Antonijs Springovičs on 26 April 1943. Although part of the original architectural plan, the church tower was not completed until after 2002.

The pastor from 1958 to 1959 and then again from 1989 to 1991 was Jānis Pujats, who was then appointed metropolitan archbishop of Riga by Pope John Paul II. The pastor from 1984 to 1989 was Jānis Bulis, who was appointed bishop of Liepāja two years later. The pastor from 1999 to 2011 was Edvards Pavlovskis, who was then appointed bishop of Jelgava by Pope Benedict XVI.
