= List of Catholic dioceses in Latvia =

The Roman Catholic Church in Latvia is composed of one ecclesiastical provinces with three suffragan dioceses.

== List of Dioceses ==
=== Episcopal Conference of Latvia ===
==== Ecclesiastical Province of Riga ====
- Archdiocese of Riga
  - Diocese of Jelgava
  - Diocese of Liepāja
  - Diocese of Rēzekne-Aglona
