= Jānis Pujats =

Catholic cardinal of Latvian origin

His Eminence Jānis Pujats
- Cardinal; Archbishop Emeritus of Riga
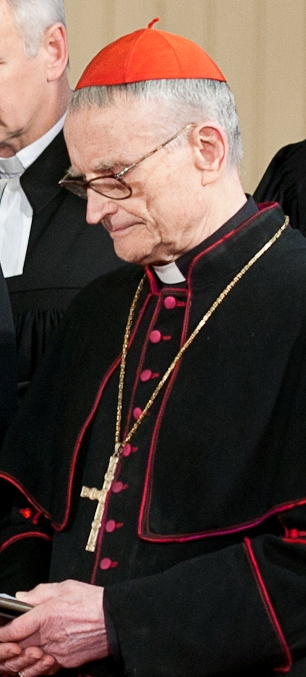
- Church: Roman Catholic Church
- Archdiocese: Riga
- See: Riga
- Appointed: 8 May 1991
- Term ended: 19 June 2010
- Predecessor: Antonijs Springovičs
- Successor: Zbigņevs Stankevičs
- Other post: Cardinal-Priest of Santa Silvia (2001–)
- Previous post: President of the Latvian Bishops' Conference (1998-2010)

Orders
- Ordination: 29 March 1951 by Antonijs Springovičs
- Consecration: 1 June 1991 by Francesco Colasuonno
- Created cardinal: 21 February 1998 (in pectore); 21 February 2001 (revealed) by Pope John Paul II
- Rank: Cardinal Priest

Personal details
- Born: Jānis Pujats; 14 November 1930 (age 95) Nautrēni, Latgale, Latvia
- Motto: Ad Jesum per Mariam
- Coat of arms

Styles of Jānis Pujats
- Reference style: His Eminence
- Spoken style: Your Eminence
- Informal style: Cardinal
- See: Riga

Jānis Pujats (born 14 November 1930) is a Latvian Catholic prelate who served as Archbishop of Riga from 1991 to 2010. He was secretly made a cardinal in 1998.

== Biography ==
Pujats was born in Nautrēni parish in Latgale. He attended the Theological Seminary in Riga until it was closed by the Soviet Union in 1951. Two months later, he was ordained in a secret ceremony by Archbishop Antonijs Springovičs. During the pontificate of Pope Paul VI, he implemented the Pope's liturgical reform and published the first missal in Latvian.

Pujats was made Archbishop of Riga in 1991. On 21 February 1998, he was made a cardinal in pectore by Pope John Paul II, a fact made public at the consistory of 21 February 2001. He was one of the cardinal electors who participated in the 2005 papal conclave that elected Pope Benedict XVI.

He speaks Russian, Polish, Lithuanian, German and Latin, in addition to his native Latvian. He was the only member of the Synod of Bishops to address the assembly exclusively in Latin at the 2001 and 2005 meetings. Pope Benedict accepted his resignation on 19 June 2010 and appointed Zbigņevs Stankevičs to succeed him in Riga.

== Views ==
=== Condemnation of homosexuality ===
In a May 2007 open letter protesting a gay pride march scheduled for 3 June 2007 as part of the Riga Pride and Friendship Days, Pujāts referred to homosexuality as "absolute depravity in sexual behavior" and an "unnatural form of prostitution". He told the faithful to "be prepared to go out into the streets" to protest the events, "not to create disorder, but to offer a disciplined position in support of the government, because on this very important issue of morals, the government is on the side of Christians."

=== Declaration of Truths ===
On 10 June 2019, Pujats, Cardinal Raymond Leo Burke, and Kazakh bishops Tomasz Peta, Jan Paul Lenga, and Athanasius Schneider published a 40-point "Declaration of Truths" claiming to reaffirm traditional Church teaching. The bishops wrote that such a declaration was necessary in a time of "almost universal doctrinal confusion and disorientation." Specific passages in the declaration implicitly relate to several writings by Pope Francis. The declaration states that "the religion born of faith in Jesus Christ" is the "only religion positively willed by God," seemingly alluding to the Document on Human Fraternity signed by Pope Francis on 4 February, which stated that the "diversity of religions" is "willed by God." Following recent changes to the Catechism to oppose capital punishment, the declaration states that the Church "did not err" in teaching that civil authorities may "lawfully exercise capital punishment" when it is "truly necessary" and to preserve the "just order of societies."

== See also ==
- Roman Catholic Church of Latvia

Catholic Church titles
Preceded by Antonijs Springovičs	Archbishop of Riga; 8 May 1991 – 19 June 2010	Succeeded by Zbigņevs Stankevičs
Preceded by Julijans Vaivods	President of the Latvian Episcopal Conference; 1998 – 19 June 2010	Succeeded by Antons Justs
Titular church created	Cardinal Priest of Santa Silvia; 21 February 2001 –	Incumbent
