= 2018 visit by Pope Francis to the Baltic states =

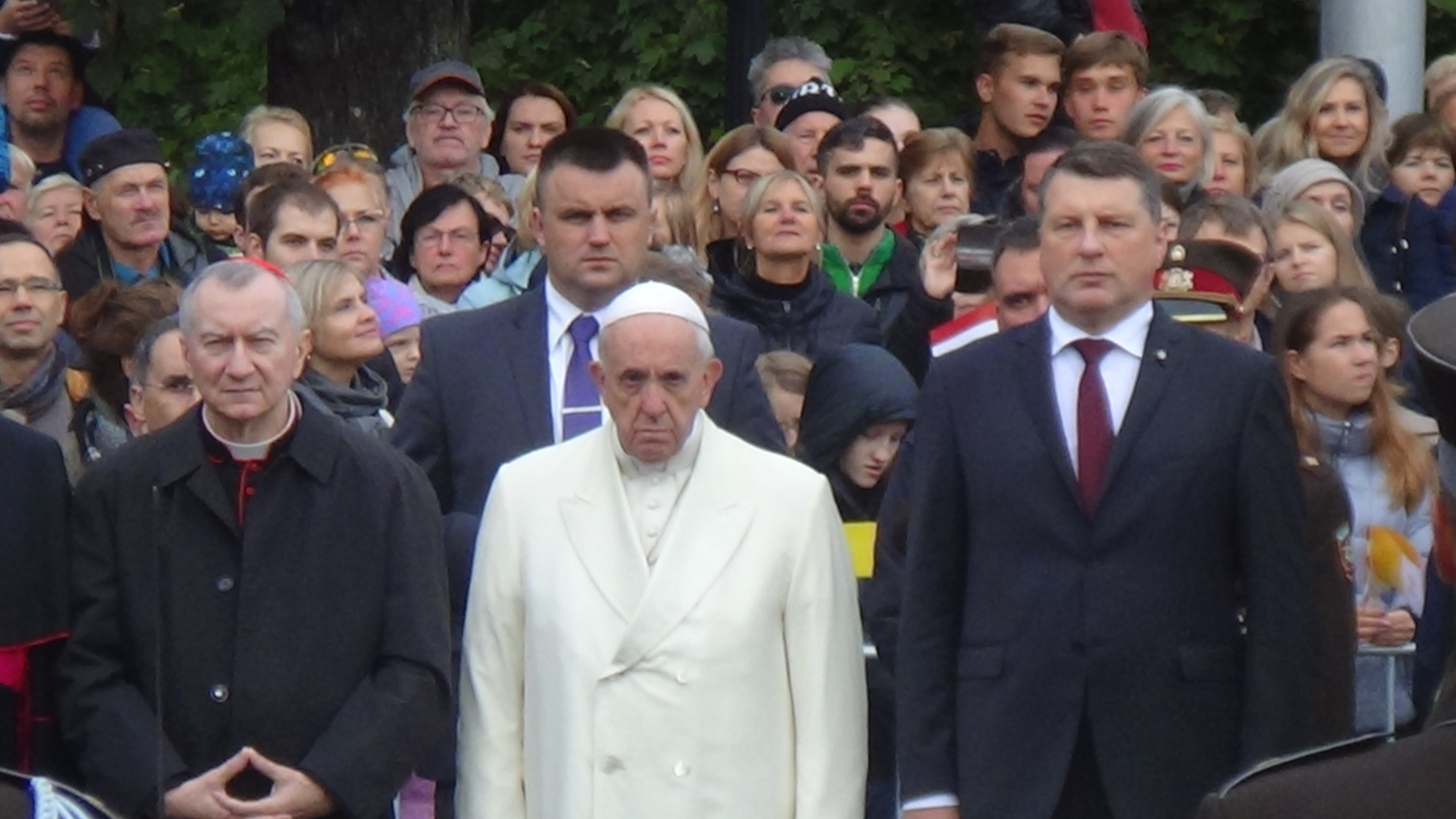
Pope Francis with Latvian president Raimonds Vējonis (right) in Latvia

Pope Francis visited the Baltic states—Lithuania, Latvia, and Estonia—from 22 to 25 September 2018.

It was announced in November 2017 by the apostolic nuncio to Estonia that Pope Francis would travel to the nation in the autumn sometime, with September being provided as a possible date. It was further related a week after that the pope would also be visiting neighboring Latvia and Lithuania; he would travel to all three to celebrate the centenary of their independence. The official confirmation for the visit would be made, according to media reports, in December 2017. The visit to the Baltic states was confirmed in a Holy See press release on 9 March 2018.

== Visit ==
=== Lithuania ===
The Pope visited Vilnius and Kaunas.

Pope Francis arrived at the airport in Lithuania's capital, Vilnius, on 22 September, where he was welcomed by Lithuania's President Dalia Grybauskaite and other political and civilian representatives. He later spoke outside the Presidential palace, where he noted how both Nazi and Soviet occupations weakened religious tolerance in the country and honored "martyrs" who died during these occupations. He also called for unity between Catholics, Lutherans, and followers of Eastern Orthodox in the country. He also visited the Divine Mercy Shrine, which serves as a major pilgrimage destination for Poles from neighboring Poland, and held a prayer service there. On 23 September, he visited Lithuania's second largest city, Kaunas. Speaking in the city's Santakos Park to an estimated crowd of 100,000, the Pope honored the Jews who suffered oppression during the Nazi occupation between 1941 and 1944. Commemorating the Lithuanian Holocaust Memorial Day, the Pope condemned anti-Semitism which fueled Holocaust propaganda. He also paid tribute to Lithuanians who were deported to Siberian gulags or tortured and oppressed during five decades of Soviet occupation. He later returned to Vilnius to hold three-minutes of silent prayer at the Vilnius Ghetto's Holocaust memorial on the date which marked the 75th anniversary of the liquidation of Jews in the area and also laid flowers. He afterwards visited Vilnius' Museum of Occupations and Freedom Fights, a Museum containing items and papers detailing the long history of Soviet oppression in Lithuania and which once served as headquarters for the local branch of the now defunct Soviet KGB, where he also spoke in the outside square to praise Lithuanians who stood up for their faith and described the country as a potential "beacon of hope."

=== Latvia ===
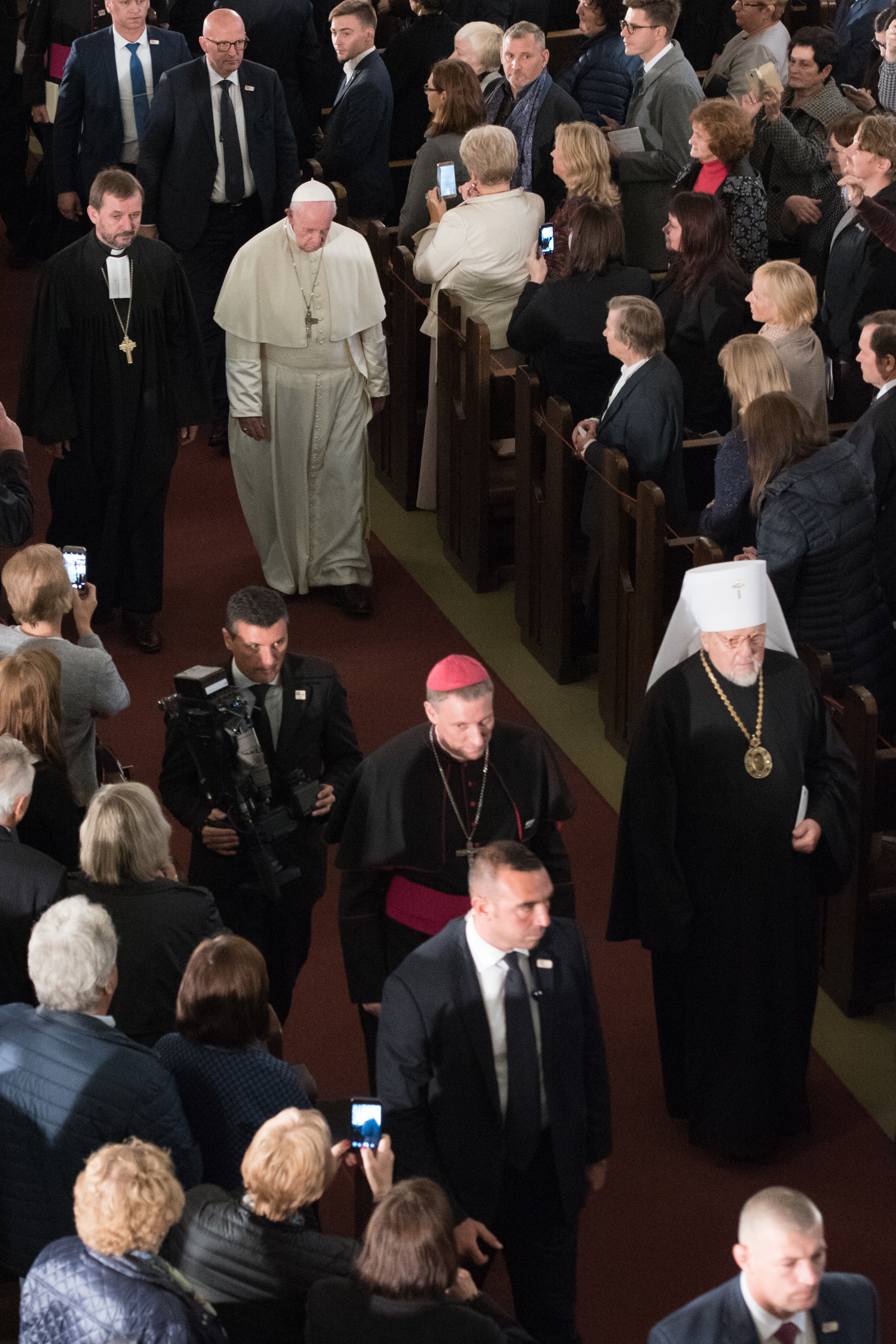
Pope Francis in procession with the archbishops of the three major Christian churches in Latvia

On 24 September, Pope Francis arrived at the airport in Latvia's capital, Riga. Upon arrival, he met with Latvian President Raimonds Vejonis and the two travelled to the Presidential Palace. Commemorating Latvia's 100th anniversary of independence from Russian control, the Pope placed flowers at Latvia's Monument of Independence. At Riga's Lutheran Cathedral, he joined local Lutheran and Eastern Orthodox leaders at a music-filled ecumenical prayer and acknowledged the many trials Latvians endured during two Soviet occupations and the World War II-era occupation by Nazi Germany. Following this meeting, he held a prayer service in front of elderly Latvian Catholics who survived Nazi and Soviet occupations at Riga's Catholic Cathedral, where he praised them for maintaining their faith during brutal occupations and called on them to use it to set an example. He repeated this message during a homily at the Mother of God Basilica in Aglona, which is considered to be Latvia's most important Catholic shrine.

=== Estonia ===
On 25 September Pope Francis concluded his four-day trip by visiting Estonia. He arrived at the airport in the Estonian capital, Tallinn. Pope Francis met with President Kersti Kaljulaid, and the two gave a public address at the Rose Garden in the Tallinn district of Kadriorg, where the Pope acknowledged how sex abuse scandals are driving people away from the church. Before leaving Estonia, Pope Francis held an outdoor mass in front of a crowd of over 10,000 at Tallinn's Freedom Square.
