= Julijans Vaivods =

Latvian cleric

His Eminence Julijans Vaivods
- Cardinal Apostolic Administrator of Riga
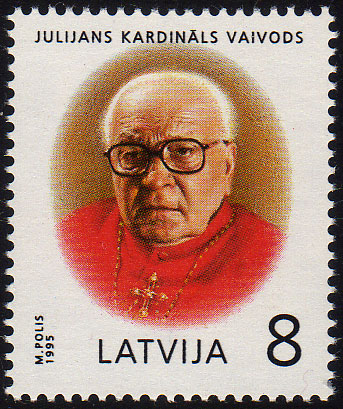
- Latvian postage stamp depicting Julijans Vaivods
- Church: Roman Catholic
- Archdiocese: Riga
- Installed: 10 Nov 1964
- Term ended: 24 May 1990
- Predecessor: Pēteris Strods
- Successor: Jānis Cakuls
- Other posts: Cardinal-Priest of Santi Quattro Coronati; Titular Bishop of Macriana Maior

Orders
- Ordination: 7 April 1918
- Consecration: 18 November 1964
- Created cardinal: 2 February 1983 by John Paul II
- Rank: Cardinal

Personal details
- Born: 18 August 1895 Vārkava, Latgale, Vitebsk Governorate (Present day Latvia)
- Died: 24 May 1990 (aged 94) Riga, Latvian SSR, Soviet Union (Present day Latvia)
- Buried: Basilica of the Assumption in Aglona

Styles of Julijans Vaivods
- Reference style: His Eminence
- Spoken style: Your Eminence
- Religious style: Cardinal
- Informal style: Cardinal
- See: Riga

Julijans Vaivods (18 August 1895 – 24 May 1990) was a Latvian Catholic prelate who served as Apostolic Administrator of Riga and of Liepāja from 1964 until his death in 1990. He was made a cardinal in 1983, the first from Latvia. He was the oldest living cardinal when he died at age 94. He was also a KGB agent throughout the Soviet period in Latvia.

== Biography ==
Julijans Vaivods studied at the Saint Petersburg Roman Catholic Theological Academy, Russia. He was ordained priest for the Metropolitan Archdiocese of Mohilev by Bishop Jan Cieplak on 7 April 1918 in St. Petersburg. He was initially sent back to Latgale to serve as a parish priest and school chaplain. He came under the jurisdiction of the newly restored Diocese of Riga on 22 September 1918. He was sent to serve as a parish priest in Courland (Kurzeme) in 1925. He later came under the jurisdiction of the Diocese of Liepāja when it was created in 1937. While serving as the vicar general of that diocese, he was elevated to monsignor on 4 July 1949.

Msgr. Vaivods was imprisoned by the Soviet authorities from 1958 to 1960. In 1962 he became vicar general of the Metropolitan Archdiocese of Riga. In 1964 he received a papal invitation to travel to Rome to attend the third session of the Second Vatican Council.

On 18 November 1964 he was consecrated titular bishop of Macriana Maior by Paolo Cardinal Marella in Rome. Cardinal Marella was assisted by Latvian bishops-in-exile Jāzeps Rancāns and Boļeslavs Sloskāns. Bishop Vaivods returned to Rome in 1965 to participate in the fourth session of the Second Vatican Council. He died in 1990 and was buried at the Basilica of the Assumption in Aglona.

In 2018, it was revealed that on 28 July 1948, the Special Department of the Soviet State Security Ministry recruited Vaivods as an agent under the codename 'Omega'. He remained a collaborator with the KGB through the Soviet period.

Records
Preceded by Pietro Parente	Oldest living Member of the Sacred College; 29 December 1986 – 24 May 1990	Succeeded by Henri de Lubac
