= Basilica of the Assumption, Aglona =

Church building in Latvia

Basilica of the Assumption of Aglona
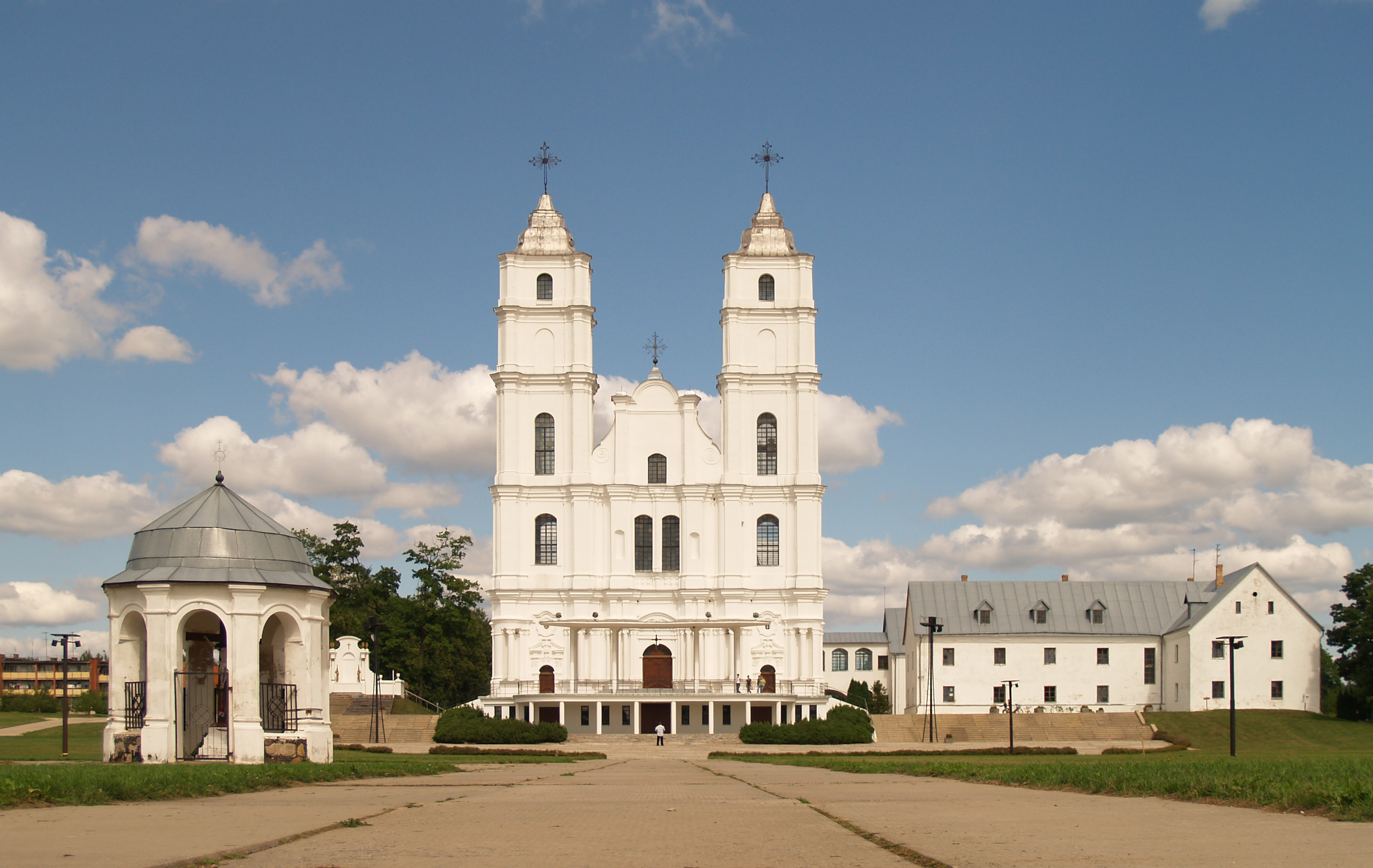

- Location within Latvia

Religion
- Affiliation: Roman Catholic Diocese of Rezekne-Aglona
- Rite: Latin
- Ecclesiastical or organizational status: Basilica
- Year consecrated: 1800

Location
- Location: Aglona, Latvia
- Interactive map of Basilica of the Assumption of Aglona
- Administration: Roman Catholic Diocese of Rezekne-Aglona
- Coordinates: 56°07′37″N 27°00′56″E

Architecture
- Style: Baroque
- Groundbreaking: 1768
- Completed: 1780

Specifications
- Spire height: 60 m
- Materials: bricks plastered

Website
- aglonasbazilika.lv

The Aglona Roman Catholic Basilica of the Assumption of the Blessed Virgin Mary (Latvian: Aglonas Vissvētākās Jaunavas Marijas debesīs uzņemšanas Romas katoļu bazilika) in Aglona is one of the most important Catholic spiritual centers in Latvia.

Construction of the present church, which is in the Italian Baroque style, began in 1768 and was completed in 1780. Dedicated to the Assumption of the Virgin Mary, it was consecrated in 1800 by Bishop Jan Benisławski.

The church was the seat of the bishop of Riga from 1920 to 1924, when the newly promoted archbishop Antonijs Springovičs moved to the Cathedral of St. James in Riga. Springovičs was consecrated bishop there on 22 August 1920 by Kaunas auxiliary bishop Juozapas Skvireckas.

Every year thousands of pilgrims flock to the Basilica on 15 August, feast day of the Assumption of the Blessed Virgin Mary. It is one of the eight international shrines recognized by the Holy See and its religious events were attended by around 300,000 pilgrims.

In 1980 the Basilica of the Assumption celebrated its 200th anniversary, and Pope John Paul II granted it the title of "Basilica minoris". In September 1993 the same pope visited the basilica.

== History ==
In 1697, Landlady Ewa Justyna Szostowicka called the then bishop of Livonia, Mikołaj Popławski, and in 1688 arrived from Vilnius a Dominican monastery priors father, Remigiusz Mosokowski and Aglona chose to place sacral buildings. In 1699 Dominicans founded a monastery where in 1670 they first built a wooden church. On 10 September 1751 was consecrated a wooden church during the third visit of the Livonian Bishop of Aglona, Józef Dominik Puzyna. Church Dominicans placed Our Lady, which was painted by Trakai Virgin icon sample.

When the original church was destroyed by fire, instead of the 1768 to 1780 year built brick monastery buildings and the current church. The interior of the church was the result of the 18th-19th century, but the pulpit, organ and confessional - the end of 18th century.

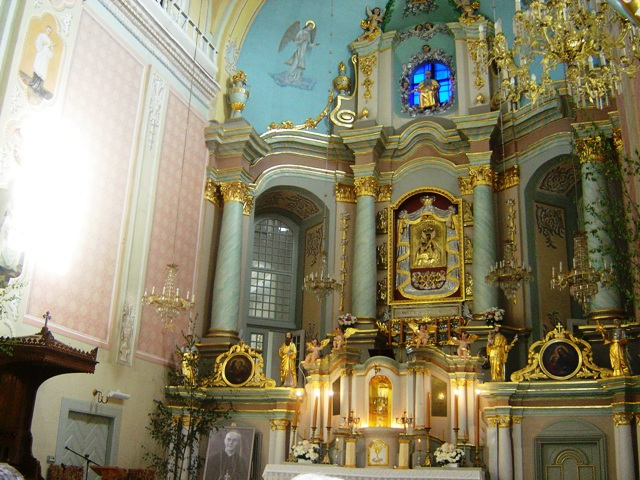
The main altar of the Basilica

Basilica of the Assumption of Aglona was built in the late Baroque style, and it is decorated with two 60-meter-high (200 ft) towers. Inside, there are cross vaults, arches, columns and it is decorated with rococo ornaments. Every year on the 15th of August, pilgrims come to celebrate the Virgin Mary's Assumption day. The Church kept the painting, sculpture and art values, including the icon of "Our Lady of Aglona's Miracle". It is believed that the painting has a healing ability. From 2011 to 2013 diocesan bishop John Bulis coordinated a Basilica's restoration work. It had pitch roofing, sheet metal cover being replaced with copper and renovation works from Basilica and convent. The basilica was carried out in a complete change of wall color, retaining the Baroque and Rococo styles, but changing the colors and patterns on the walls. The altar's large columns and cornices evolved from blue-green marble imitation of the little pink reddish, thus the whole altar become much "warmer". In contrast, the rest of the wall painting in the Basilica of the pitch line of decorative elements are pale yellow and pink colors of marble imitation celadon. All Basilica's decorative paint is a lot more marble imitation than it was before. It lost a few pictures of the saints and Christian symbols such as the dove (as a symbol of the Holy Spirit), the Lamb of God symbol, etc.
