= Archbishop of Riga =

Archbishop of Riga may refer to:

- Evangelical Lutheran Church of Latvia § Archbishop of Riga, Metropolitan Archbishop and Primate of the Evangelical Lutheran Church of Latvia (Lutheran Church and Anglican/Lutheran Porvoo Communion)
- Roman Catholic Archdiocese of Riga, Metropolitan Archbishop for Latvia in the Roman Catholic Church
- Archbishopric of Riga, the medieval archbishops who held secular authority over the city of Riga
