= St. Joseph Cathedral, Liepāja =

Coordinates: 56.5050°N 21.0075°E

St. Joseph Cathedral
- Liepājas Svētā Jāzepa Romas katoļu katedrāle
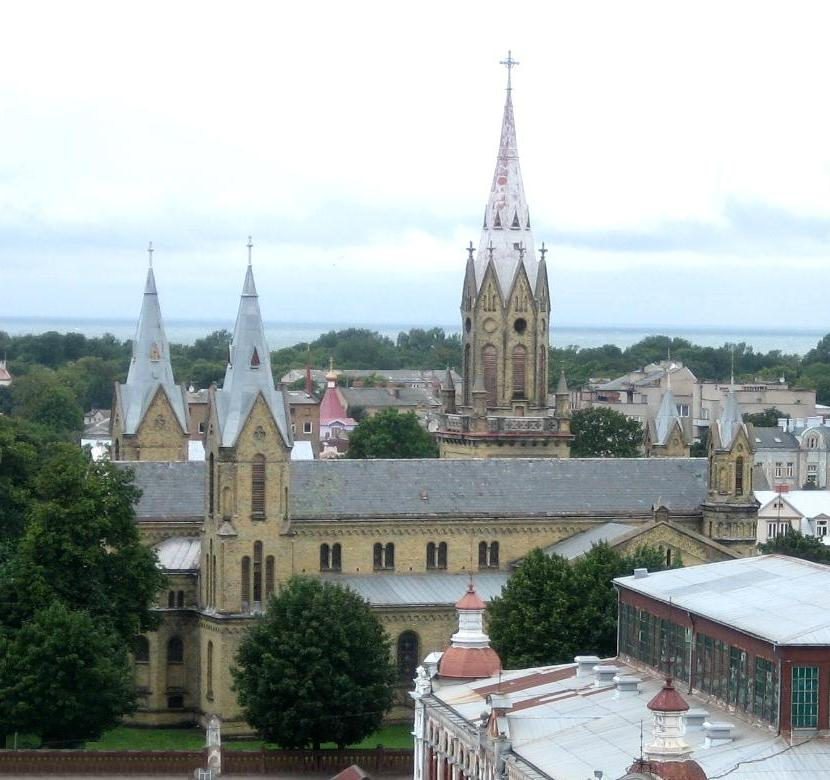
- St. Joseph Cathedral
- Location: Liepāja
- Country: Latvia
- Denomination: Roman Catholic Church

The Cathedral of Saint Joseph (Latvian: Liepājas Svētā Jāzepa Romas katoļu katedrāle) is the cathedral church of the Diocese of Liepāja located in Liepāja, Latvia.

== History ==
Liepāja originally had a small wooden church built in 1508 and dedicated to Saint Ann. Around 1560 the church was converted to Lutheran worship. After the Reformation, the faithful of the Catholic Church had to travel to Lithuania to receive baptism and the other sacraments, because they did not have a place of Catholic worship available.

In 1747 a small stone church dedicated to Saint Joseph was built in Liepāja. Religious services were conducted initially only on the third Sunday of each month. With the development of the city and the increased number of the faithful, the old church soon became too small. Intone carried out the construction of a new neo-Romanesque church, designed by architect Luis Melvil. It was completed and consecrated in 1911 in honor of St. Joseph.

On May 8, 1937 with the bull Aeterna salus animarum Pope Pius XI erected the Diocese of Liepāja and the church of St. Joseph was elevated to cathedral status.

== See also ==
- Catholic Church in Latvia
