= Ārvaldis Andrejs Brumanis =

Latvian Roman Catholic bishop

- Bishop of Liepāja
- Church: Catholic Church
- Diocese: Diocese of Liepāja
- In office: 7 December 1995 – 12 May 2001
- Predecessor: Jānis Bulis
- Successor: Wilhelm Lapelis

Orders
- Ordination: 25 July 1954 by André-Marie Charue
- Consecration: 6 January 1996 by Pope John Paul II

Personal details
- Born: 13 February 1926 Klostere parish, Kuldīga county, Latvia
- Died: 17 December 2013 (aged 87) Liepāja, Latvia

Ārvaldis Andrejs Brumanis (13 February 1926 − 17 December 2013) was a Latvian Roman Catholic bishop.

Ordained to the priesthood on 25 July 1954, Brumanis was named bishop of the Roman Catholic Diocese of Liepāja, Latvia on 7 December 1995 and retired on 12 May 2001.
