= Jānis Bulis =

Latvian Catholic bishop

The Most Reverend Jānis Bulis
- Bishop of Rēzekne-Aglona
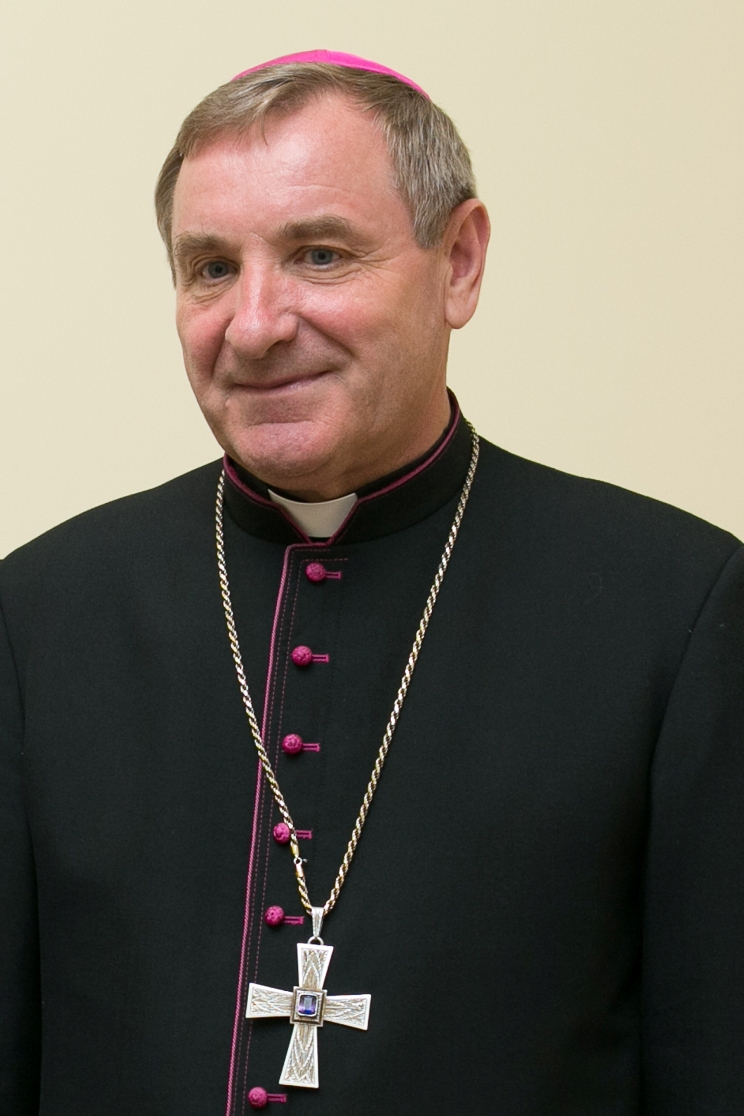
- Church: Catholic Church
- Diocese: Rēzekne-Aglona
- See: Rēzekne-Aglona
- Appointed: 7 December 1995
- Installed: 6 January 1996
- Previous posts: Bishop of Liepāja (1991-95); Vice-President of the Latvian Episcopal Conference (2011); President of the Latvian Episcopal Conference (2011-18)

Orders
- Ordination: 22 May 1977 by Julijans Vaivods
- Consecration: 24 June 1991 by Francesco Colasuonno

Personal details
- Born: Jānis Bulis; 17 August 1950 (age 75) Briģi, Ludza Municipality, Latvia
- Motto: Pro Christo et Ecclesia
- Coat of arms

Jānis Bulis (born 17 August 1950 in Briģi Parish, Ludza Municipality) is a Catholic bishop of the Diocese of Rēzekne-Aglona in Latvia.

== Biography ==
Jānis Bulis was born on 17 August 1950 in Briģi Parish, Ludza Municipality, Latvia. After his secondary education, he entered in the Riga's Metropolitan Roman Catholic Theological Seminary in 1972, from which he finished in 1977. The same year, on May 22, 1977, he was ordained to the priesthood at St. James's Cathedral in Riga by Cardinal Julijans Vaivods. Bulis' first religious services occurred on June 5, 1977 at the Holy Trinity Church in Briģi. On May 8, 1991, Bulis was nominated to become bishop, being consecrated in the Roman Catholic Diocese of Liepāja on June 24 the same year. On December 7, 1995, Bulis was appointed bishop of the Roman Catholic Diocese of Rēzekne-Aglona, and on January 6, 1996, he was installed as its diocesan bishop.

== Devotional service before became bishop ==
- 14/06/1977 - 06/11/1980 - Vicar of St. Peter's Chains Church in Daugavpils.
- 06/11/1980 - 11/07/1984 - Parish priest of the Virgin of Anguish Church and at that time also served Dukstigals Virgin Mary Church.
- 11/07/1984 - 26/01/1989 - Parish priest at Christ the King Church in Riga.
- 26/01/1989 - 31.08.1991 - Parish priest at Ludzas and the Dean's Office from 23/01/1991, also served Virgin Mary church in Pušmucovas.

== Awards ==
Order of the Three Stars II degree (2012)
