= Diocese of Rēzekne-Aglona =

Latin Catholic diocese in Latvia

Coordinates: 56.4997°N 27.3391°E

Diocese of Rēzekne–Aglona Dioecesis Rezeknensis–Aglonensis Diecēze Rēzeknes-Aglonas
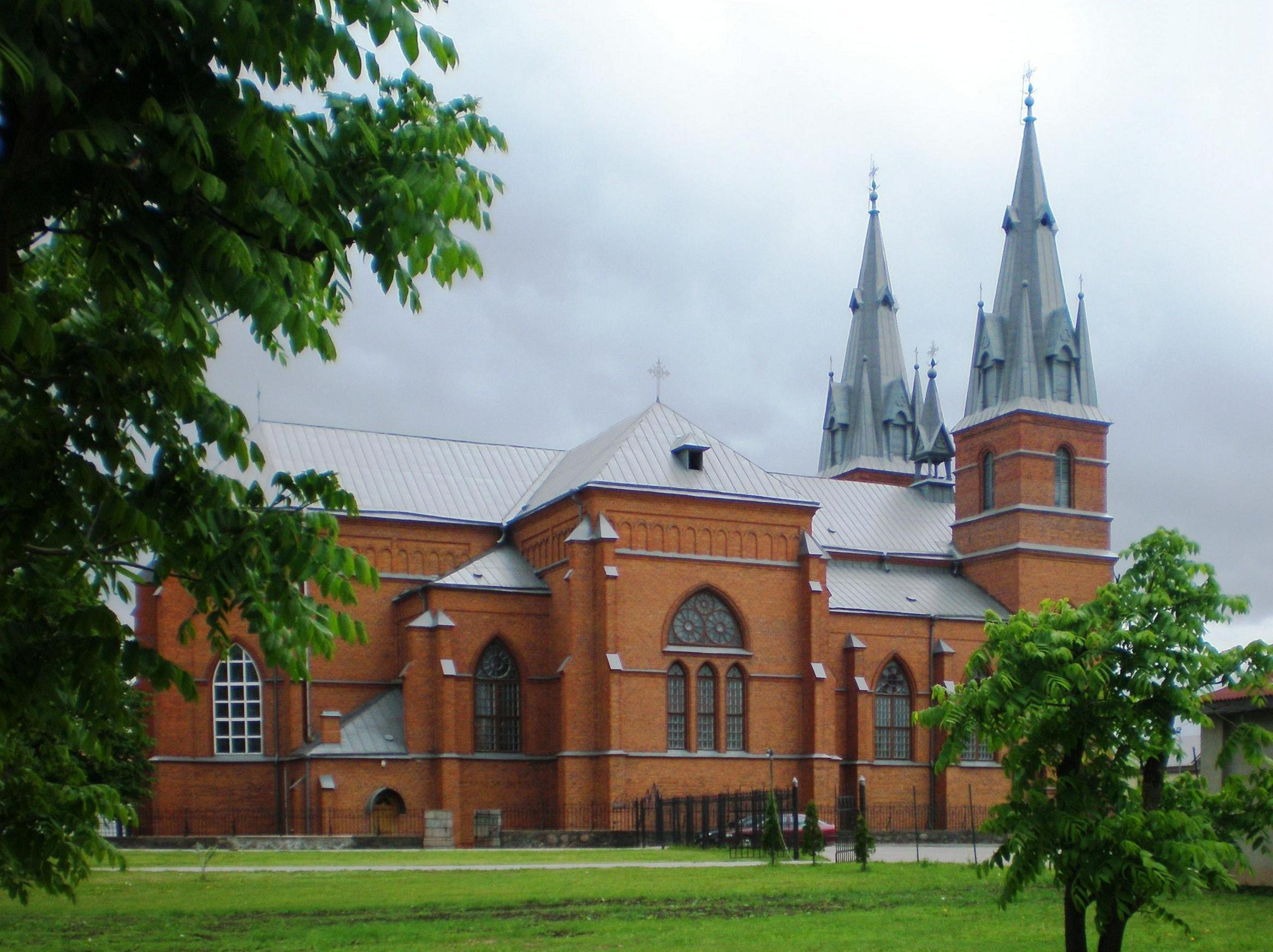
- Sacred Heart Cathedral

Location
- Country: Latvia
- Metropolitan: Riga

Statistics
- Area: 15,679 km^{2} (6,054 sq mi)
- Population: Total; Catholics: (as of 2014); 301,053; 88,720 (29.5%)

Information
- Sui iuris church: Latin Church
- Rite: Latin Rite
- Cathedral: Rēzeknes Jēzus Sirds katedrāle (Cathedral of the Sacred Heart of Jesus)

Current leadership
- Pope: Leo XIV
- Bishop: Jānis Bulis
- Metropolitan Archbishop: Zbigņevs Stankevičs

Map
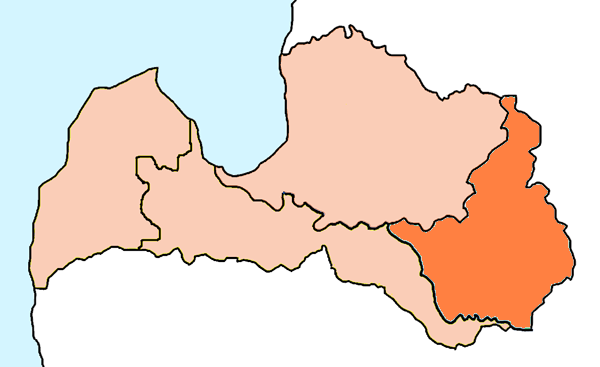
- Location of Diocese of Rēzekne-Aglona in Latvia

The Diocese of Rēzekne–Aglona (Latin: Dioecesis Rezeknensis–Aglonensis) is a diocese located in the cities of Rēzekne and Aglona in the ecclesiastical province of Riga in Latvia.

== History ==
- 2 December 1995: Established as Diocese of Rēzekne–Aglona from Metropolitan Archdiocese of Riga

== Special churches ==
- Minor Basilicas:
  - Vissvētākās Jaunavas Marijas Debesīs Uzņemšanas Bazilika in Aglona
    (Basilica of the Assumption of the Blessed Virgin Mary)

== Leadership ==
- Bishops of Rēzekne–Aglona (Roman rite)
  - Jānis Bulis (7 Dec 1995 – )

== See also ==
- Roman Catholicism in Latvia

== Sources ==
- GCatholic.org
- Catholic Hierarchy
