= Santa Silvia =

- Church of Saint Silvia
- Chiesa di Santa Silvia
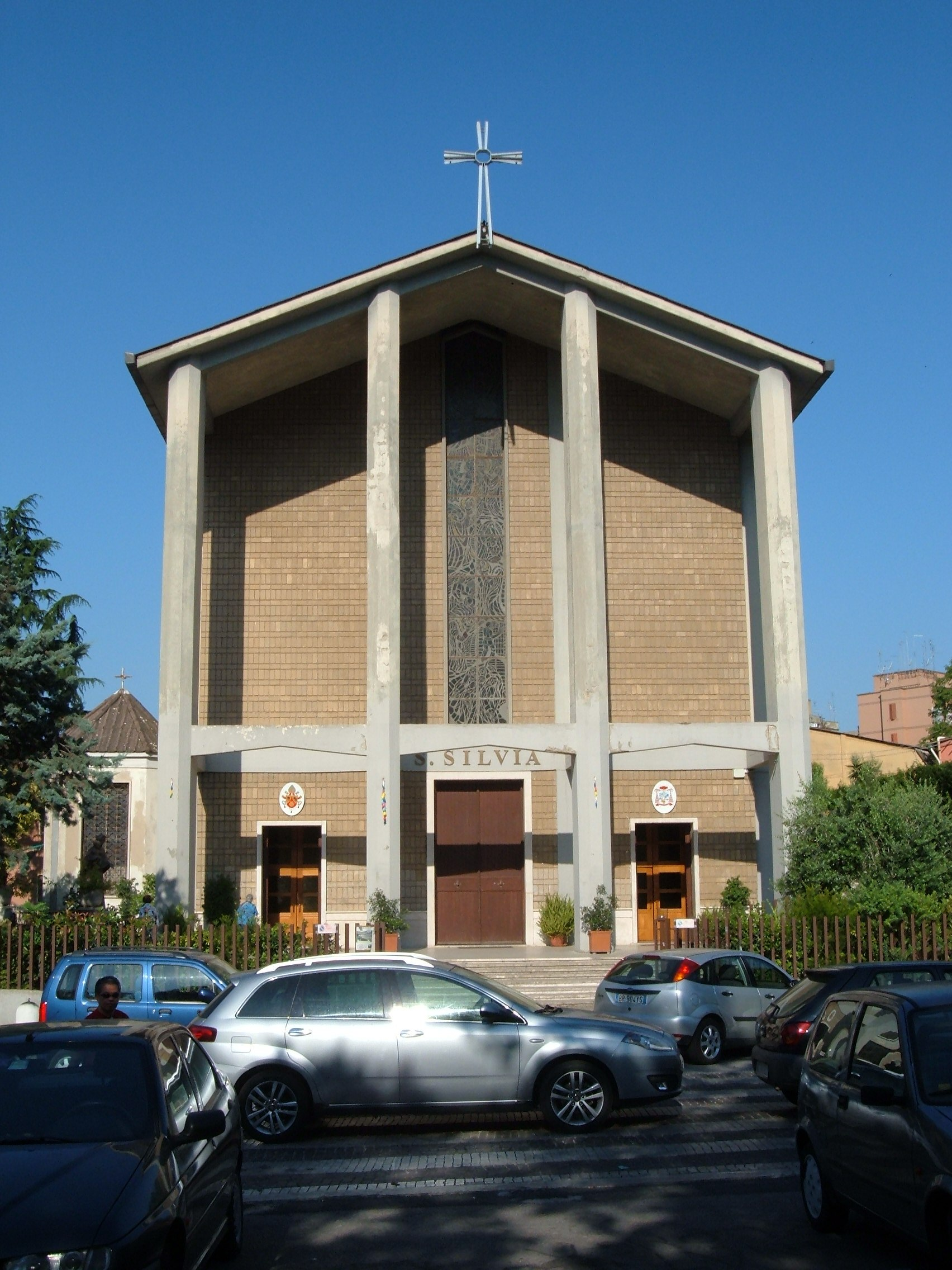
- Click on the map for a fullscreen view
- 41°51′22″N 12°26′59″E
- Location: Viale Giuseppe Sirtori 2, Rome
- Country: Italy
- Language: Italian
- Denomination: Catholic
- Tradition: Roman Rite
- Website: parrocchiasantasilvia.it

History
- Status: titular church
- Dedication: Saint Silvia
- Consecrated: 1968

Architecture
- Architectural type: Modern
- Groundbreaking: 1963
- Completed: 1968

Administration
- Diocese: Rome

Santa Silvia is a 20th-century parochial church and titular church in southwest Rome, dedicated to Saint Silvia (6th century AD, mother of Gregory the Great).

== History ==
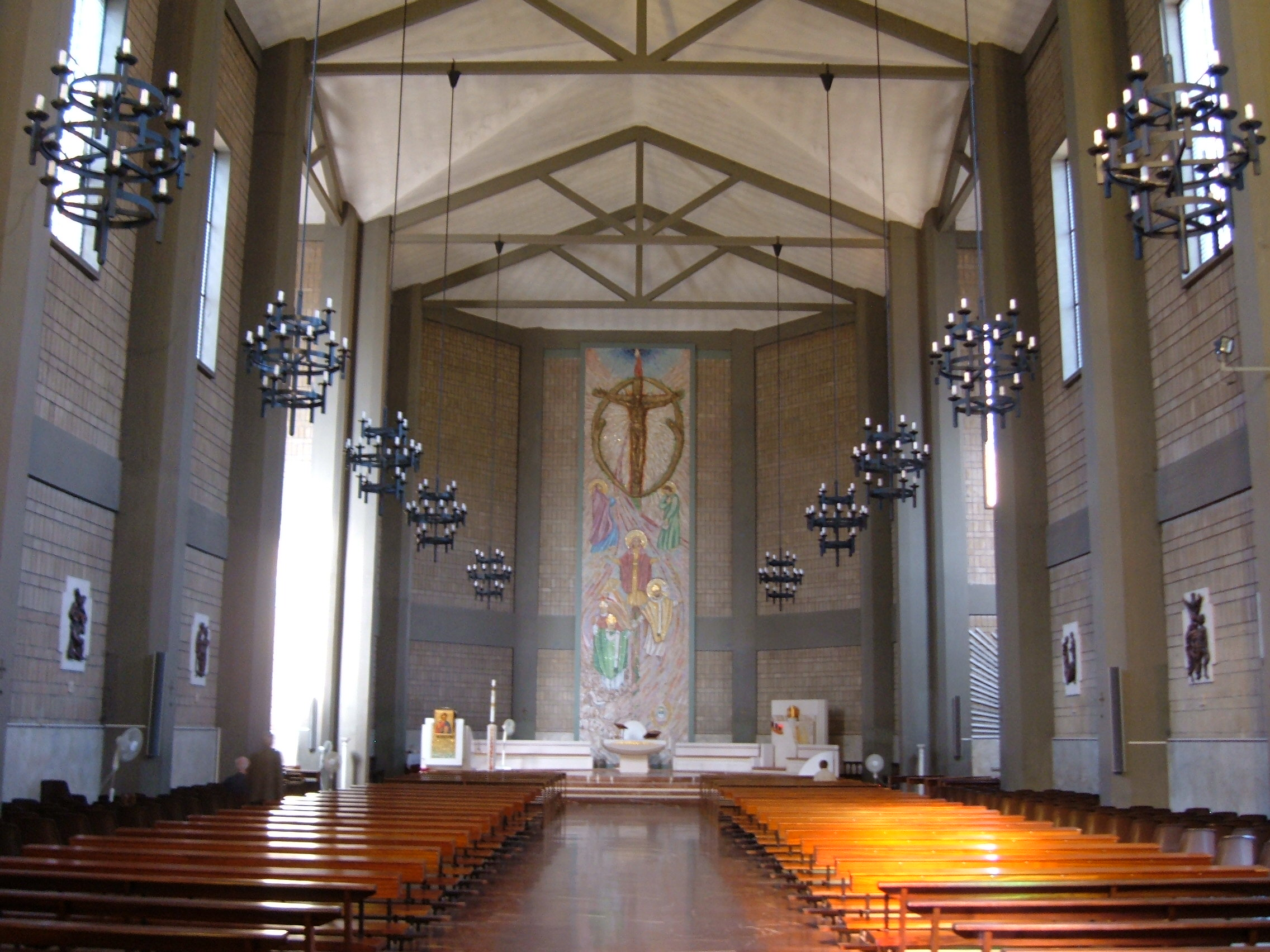
Interior

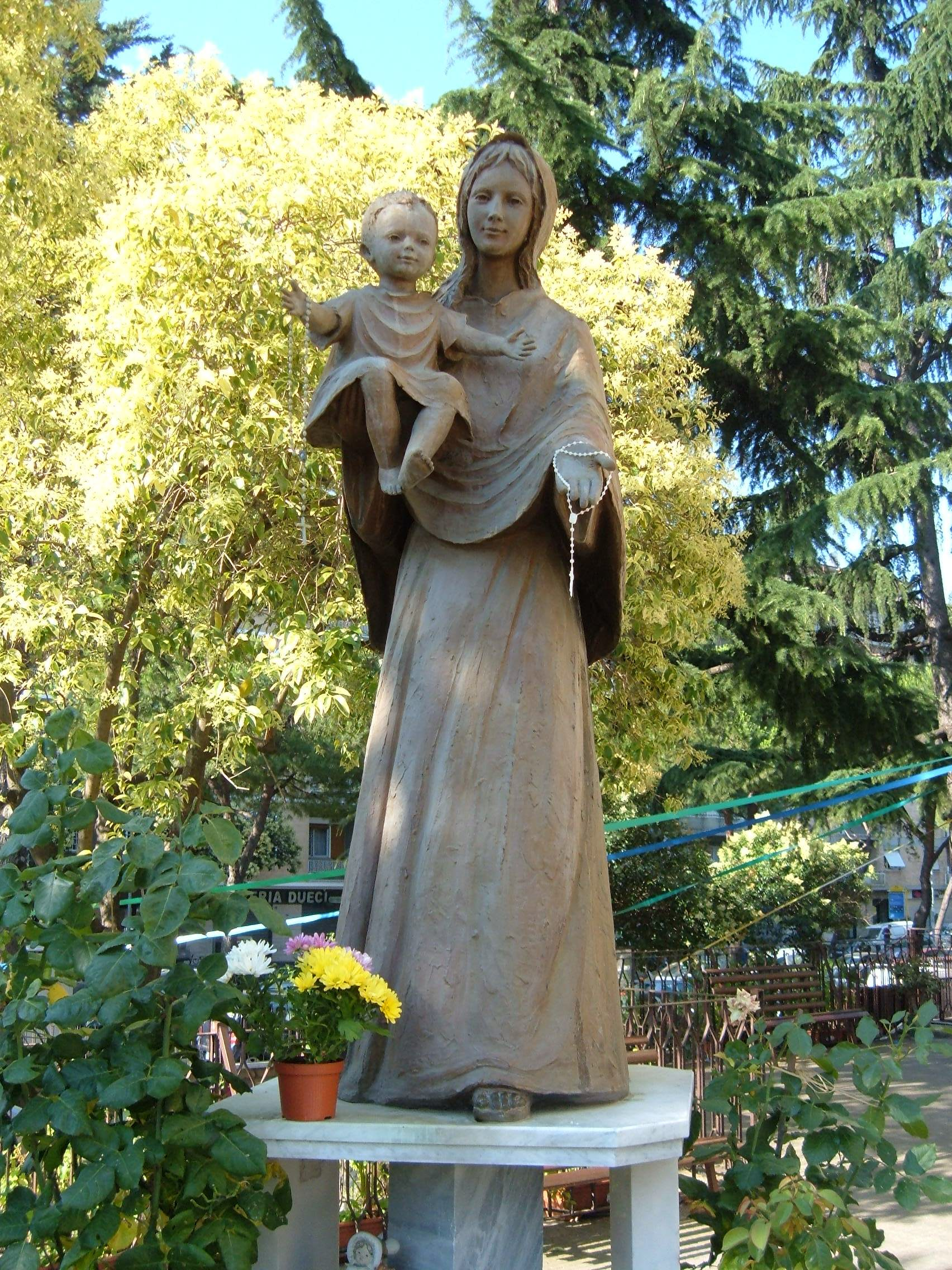
Statue of Saint Silvia with the infant Gregory.

The church was built in 1963–1968.

On 21 February 2001, it was made a titular church to be held by a cardinal-priest.

Cardinal-protectors

- Jānis Pujats (2001–present)
