= Aglona Parish =

Parish of Latvia

- parish of Latvia
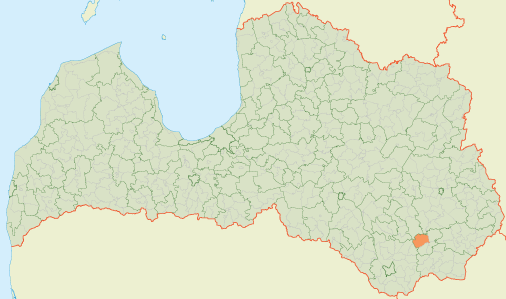
- 56°07′09″N 27°00′30″E
- Country: Latvia

Area
  - Total: 131.95 km^{2} (50.95 sq mi)
  - Land: 117.44 km^{2} (45.34 sq mi)
  - Water: 14.51 km^{2} (5.60 sq mi)

Population (1 January 2024)
  - Total: 1,509
  - Density: 11/km^{2} (30/sq mi)
- Website: www.aglona.lv

Aglona Parish (Latvian: Aglonas pagasts) is an administrative unit of Preiļi Municipality in the Latgale region of Latvia. From 2009 until 2021, it was part of the former Aglona Municipality.

== Towns, villages and settlements of Aglona Parish ==
- Aglona
