= Diocese of Jelgava =

Roman Catholic diocese in Latvia

Coordinates: 56.6491°N 23.7271°E

Diocese of Jelgava Dioecesis Ielgavensis Diecēze Jelgavas
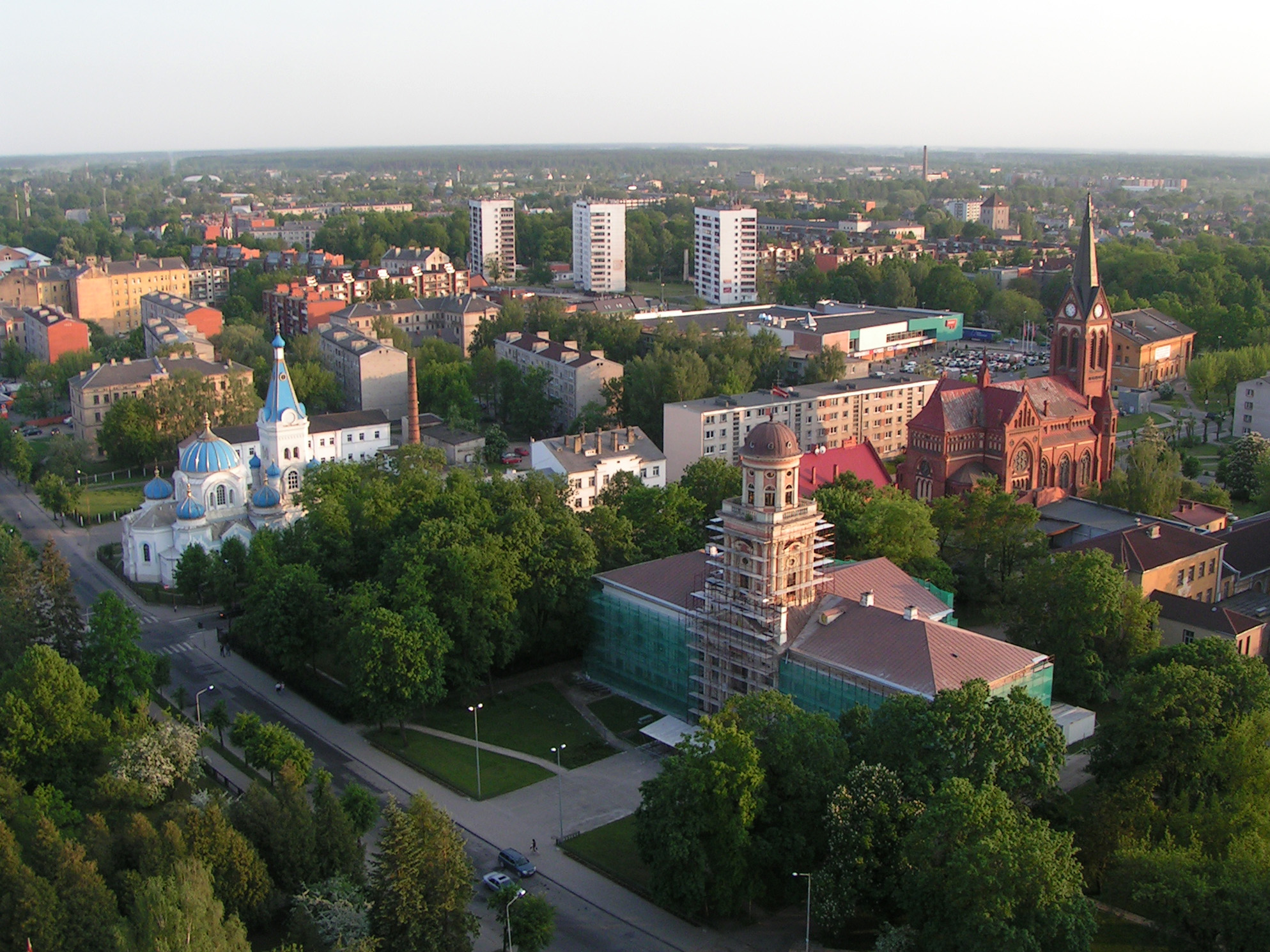
- St Mary's Cathedral on the right

Location
- Country: Latvia
- Metropolitan: Riga

Statistics
- Area: 13,620 km^{2} (5,260 sq mi)
- Population: Total; Catholics: (as of 2016); 211,707; 77,880 (36.8%)
- Parishes: 59

Information
- Sui iuris church: Latin Church
- Rite: Latin Rite
- Cathedral: Bezvainīgās Jaunavas Marijas katedrāle (Cathedral of Our Lady)

Current leadership
- Pope: Leo XIV
- Bishop: vacant
- Metropolitan Archbishop: Zbigņevs Stankevičs
- Bishops emeritus: Edvards Pavlovski

Map
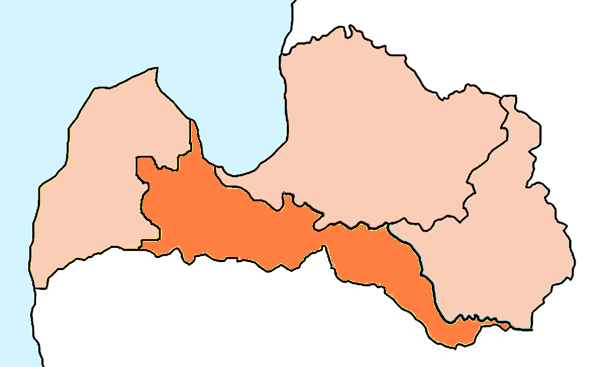
- Location of Diocese of Jelgava in Latvia

The Roman Catholic Diocese of Jelgava (Latin: Ielgaven(sis)) is a diocese located in the city of Jelgava in the ecclesiastical province of Riga in Latvia.

== History ==
- 2 December 1995: Established as Diocese of Jelgava from the Diocese of Liepāja

== Bishops ==
- Antons Justs (7 December 1995 – 22 July 2011)
- Edvards Pavlovskis (22 July 2011 – 5 January 2025)

== See also ==
- Roman Catholicism in Latvia
- List of Roman Catholic dioceses in Latvia

== Sources ==
- GCatholic.org
- Catholic Hierarchy
- Diocese website
