= Nautrēni Parish =

Parish in Rēzekne Municipality, Latvia

- parish of Latvia
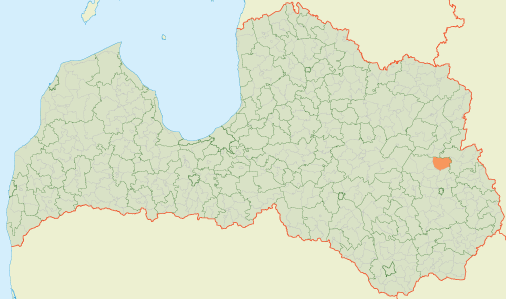
- Coordinates: 56°44′15″N 27°22′08″E
- Country: Latvia

Population (1 January 2026)
  - Total: 853
- Time zone: Eastern European Time

Nautrēni Parish (Latvian: Nautrēnu pagasts, Latgalian: Nautrānu pogosts) is an administrative unit of Rēzekne Municipality, Latvia.

== Villages and settlements of Nautrēni parish ==
The central village of the parish is Rogovka.
