= Concordat of 1922 =

1922 treaty between Latvia and Vatican

Concordat signed between the Latvian government and the Vatican on 30 May 1922 by Latvian foreign minister Zigfrīds Meierovics and Cardinal Secretary of State Pietro Gasparri. Ratifications were exchanged at the Vatican on 3 November 1922 by Latvian deputy foreign minister Hermanis Albats and Cardinal Gasparri, and the agreement became effective on the same day. It was registered in League of Nations Treaty Series on 16 June 1923. The concordat became obsolete in 2000, as it was replaced by a new agreement between the Holy See and Latvia.

== Terms of the agreement ==
- Article 1 granted the Catholic Church in Latvia freedom to operate, as well as the status of corporate entity.
- Article 2 required the Catholic Church to elevate its Diocese for Riga (reestablished in 1918) to an Archdiocese and stipulated all the Bishops should be of Latvian nationality.
- Article 3 stipulated that the Archdiocese of Riga shall be under Vatican jurisdiction on all church matters.
- Article 4 gave the Latvian government the right to veto every candidate for Bishop in its territory.
- Article 5 made it compulsory for every Bishop in Latvia to swear allegiance to Latvian law.
- Article 6 stipulated the Archdiocese of Riga shall be run under Canon Law.
- In Article 7 the Latvian government undertook to provide the proper buildings for the Archbishop and the operation of the Archdiocese of Riga.
- Article 8 gave the Archbishop of Riga the right to appoint the Priests under his jurisdiction.
- Article 9 exempted members of the clergy from military service as well as jury service.
- Article 10 allowed the Catholic Church in Latvia to establish its own system of schools.
- Article 11 provided for the operation of a priestly seminary in the Latvian language.
- Article 12 limited the right to appoint non-Latvian nationals as members of the clergy.
- Article 13 regulated the activities of Catholic associations in Latvia.
- Article 14 made church property inviolable.
- Article 15 made churches and cemeteries inviolable.
- Article 16 regulated the taxation of church property.
- Article 17 gave the Latvian authorities the freedom to prosecute priests accused of crimes.
- Article 18 gave the Archdiocese of Riga the right to be informed of any criminal proceedings initiated against a priest accused of crimes.
- Article 19 permitted priests convicted of crimes to serve their sentence in monasteries, with the consent of the Archbishop.
- Article 20 stipulated the agreement shall remain in force for three years, unless extended later.
- Articles 21-22 provided for ratification by Vatican and Latvian authorities.

The concordat was modified by a supplementary protocol signed on 25 January 1938.

== See also ==
- 1923 Latvian church property referendum
