= Jānis Cakuls =

Latvian Roman Catholic prelate (1926–2022)

Jānis Cakuls (4 July 1926 – 26 February 2022) was a Latvian Roman Catholic prelate.

Cakuls was ordained to the priesthood in 1949. He served as titular bishop of Tinista and as auxiliary bishop of the Roman Catholic Archdiocese of Riga, Latvia, until 1993 when he resigned. Cakuls died in Riga on 26 February 2022, at the age of 95.
