= Antons Justs =

Latvian Roman Catholic bishop (1931–2019)

- Bishop of Jelgava
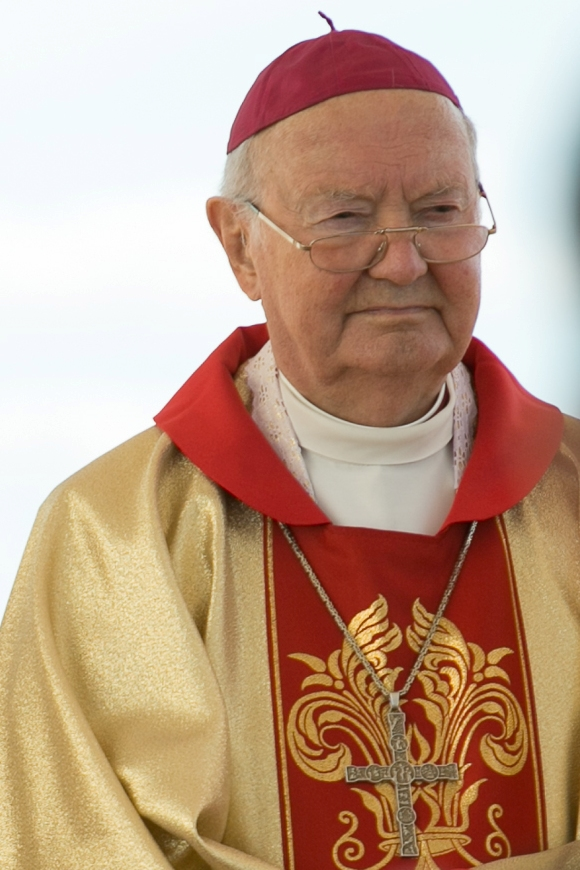
- Church: Catholic Church
- Diocese: Diocese of Jelgava
- In office: 7 December 1995 – 22 July 2011
- Predecessor: Diocese erected
- Successor: Edvards Pavlovskis

Orders
- Ordination: 11 July 1960 by Boļeslavs Sloskāns
- Consecration: 6 January 1996 by Pope John Paul II

Personal details
- Born: 22 November 1931 Varakļāni, Latgale, Latvia
- Died: 17 February 2019 (aged 87) Jelgava, Latvia
- Coat of arms

Antons Justs (22 November 1931 – 17 February 2019) was a Latvian Roman Catholic bishop.

Justs was born in Latvia and was ordained to the priesthood in 1960. After serving in Virginia in the U.S., he served as bishop of the Roman Catholic Diocese of Jelgava, Latvia, from 1996 to 2011.
