= Catholic Church in Latvia =

Catholic church of a place

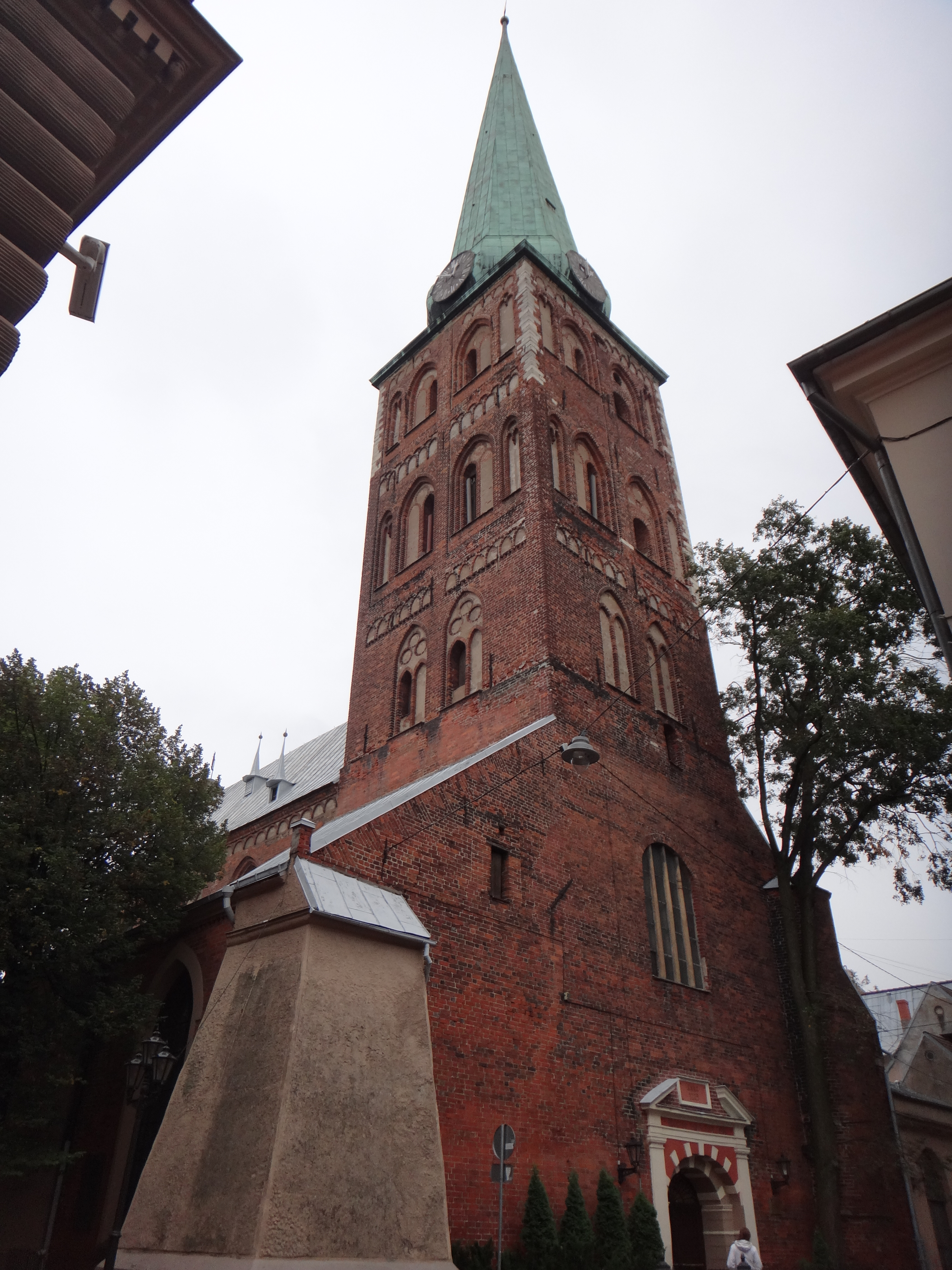
The catholic medieval Cathedral of St James, Riga

The Catholic Church in Latvia (Latvian: Latvijas Katoļu baznīca) is part of the worldwide Catholic Church, under the spiritual leadership of the Pope in Rome.

In 2021, there were approximately 370,000 Catholics in the country – 19% of the total population. Catholics in Latvia are mainly found in the easternmost region of Latgale and most are ethnic Latgalians.

== History ==
The Catholic Church has been present in the area that now constitutes the Republic of Latvia since Saint Canute IV in the mid-11th century brought Christianity to Courland and Livonia and the first Christian church was built 1048 in Courland. Bishop Albert of Riga and the Livonian Brothers of the Sword were the first to initiate organized Christianization of all the indigenous people in the early 13th century - at the time tribal cultures like the Curonians, the Latgallians, the Livs, the Selonians and the Semigallians.

== Organization ==
The highest office in the Catholic Church of Latvia was held from 1991 to 2010 by Cardinal Archbishop Jānis Pujats. On 19 June 2010, Pope Benedict XVI accepted the retirement of Archbishop Pujats and appointed Zbigņevs Stankevičs as his successor.

The Catholic Church of Latvia is divided into one archdiocese and three dioceses:

- Archdiocese of Rīga
  - Diocese of Jelgava
  - Diocese of Liepāja
  - Diocese of Rēzekne-Aglona

== See also ==
- Religion in Latvia
