= Diocese of Liepāja =

Roman Catholic diocese in Latvia

Coordinates: 56.5052°N 21.0075°E

Diocese of Liepāja Dioecesis Liepaiensis Diecēzē Liepājas

Location
- Country: Latvia
- Ecclesiastical province: Riga
- Metropolitan: Riga

Statistics
- Area: 13,210 km^{2} (5,100 sq mi)
- Population: Total; Catholics: (as of 2016); 274,200; 27,400 (10%)

Information
- Sui iuris church: Latin Church
- Rite: Latin Rite
- Cathedral: Svētā Jāzepa Katedrālē (Cathedral of St. Joseph)

Current leadership
- Pope: Leo XIV
- Bishop: Viktors Stulpins
- Metropolitan Archbishop: Zbigņevs Stankevičs
- Bishops emeritus: Vilhelms Toms Marija Lapelis

Map
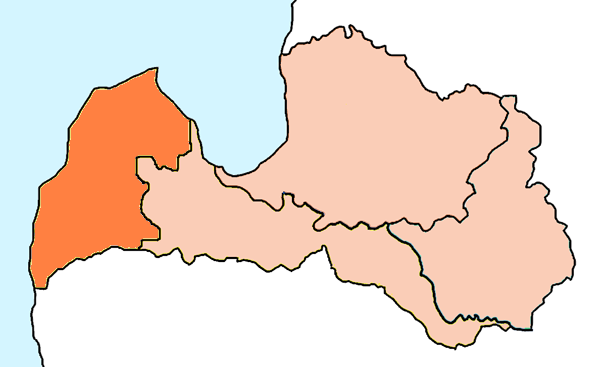

The Roman Catholic Diocese of Liepāja (Latin: Liepaien(sis)) is a diocese located in the city of Liepāja in the ecclesiastical province of Riga in Latvia.

== History ==
- 8 May 1937: Established as Diocese of Liepāja from the Archdiocese of Riga
- 2 December 1995: Lost territory to new Diocese of Jelgava

== Leadership ==
- Bishops of Liepāja (Roman rite)
  - Antonijs Urbšs (29 Apr 1938 – 11 Aug 1965)
  - Pēteris Strods (Apostolic Administrator 25 Jul 1947 – 5 Aug 1960)
  - Julijans Vaivods (Apostolic Administrator 10 Nov 1964 – 24 May 1990)
  - Jānis Cakuls (Apostolic Administrator 23 May 1990 – 8 May 1991)
  - Jānis Bulis (8 May 1991 – 7 Dec 1995)
  - Ārvaldis Andrejs Brumanis (7 Dec 1995 – 12 May 2001)
  - Vilhelms Toms Marija Lapelis, O.P. (12 May 2001 – 20 June 2012)
  - Viktors Stulpins (7 September 2013 – present)

== See also ==
- Roman Catholicism in Latvia

== Sources ==
- GCatholic.org
- Catholic Hierarchy
- Diocese website
