= Antonijs Springovičs =

Latvian archbishop (1876–1958)

His Excellency Antonijs Springovičs
- Archbishop of Riga
- Church: Roman Catholic
- Archdiocese: Riga
- Appointed: 25 October 1923
- In office: 1923-1958
- Successor: Pēteris Strods
- Previous post: Bishop of Riga (1920-1923)

Orders
- Ordination: 24 June 1901 by Bolesław Hieronim Kłopotowski
- Consecration: 22 August 1920 by Juozapas Skvireckas
- Rank: Metropolitan Archbishop

Personal details
- Born: November 1, 1876 Rēzekne, Russian Empire Present-day Latvia
- Died: October 1, 1958 (aged 81) Riga, Latvian SSR, Soviet Union
- Buried: St Michael's Cemetery, Riga

Antonijs Springovičs (1 November 1876 – 1 October 1958) was a Latvian Roman Catholic prelate who became the first Archbishop of Riga in 1923.

== Early years ==
Springovičs was born on 31 October 1876 in Rēzekne. In 1897, he joined the seminary in Saint Petersburg. He received a Master's degree in Theology. He was ordained priest by Bolesław Hieronim Kłopotowski, the Archbishop of Mohilev on 24 June 1901.

== Bishop of Riga ==
On 29 September 1918, the Diocese of Riga was restored and Eduard O'Rourke was appointed as the first bishop. O'Rourke's position in Riga was problematic as German forces occupied the city in early 1919. By the end of World War I, the ecclesiastical organisation was largely destroyed, and only a few priests were active. O'Rourke did not speak Latvian but tried to encourage Latvian priests. He resigned after a new government in Latvia was appointed and there was a popular movement calling for an ethnic Latvian bishop. Thus on 14 April 1920 Pope Benedict XV appointed Springovičs as O'Rourke's successor with the bull Hodies nos. He was consecrated bishop on 22 August 1920 by Juozapas Skvireckas.

== Metropolitan Archbishop ==
On 25 November 1923, Springovičs was appointed as the first archbishop of Riga after the diocese was elevated on 25 October 1923. In November 1926, he was awarded the Latvian Order of the Three Stars. On 8 May 1937, Springovičs became metropolitan archbishop after the suffragan Diocese of Liepāja was created. In 1939 he was awarded an honorary doctorate from the University of Latvia.

== Soviet occupation ==
Springovičs faced numerous challenges during the Soviet occupation. The Faculty of Theology in the University of Latvia was closed and its library books were confiscated. Springovičs remained in Latvia under the pretext of poor health after he was ordered to leave. On 7 March 1946, the Major Seminary of Riga was reopened after it was closed by the Soviets. Springovičs died on October 1, 1958, aged 81, in Riga. His funeral took place on October 6 in St. James's Cathedral, Riga. The requiem mass was celebrated by Bishop Pēteris Strods. Springovičs was buried in St Michael's cemetery in Riga.

== Ecclesiastical appointments ==
- 1901 - 1905: School chaplain
- 1905 - 1917: Dean of Līksna
- 1917 - 1918: General Vicar of Mohilev
- 1918 - 1920: General Vicar of Riga
- 1920 - 1923: Bishop of Riga
- 1923 - 1937: Archbishop of Riga
- 1937 - 1958: Metropolitan Archbishop of Riga
