= Aglona =

Village in Latvia

Aglona Latgalian: Aglyuna
- Village
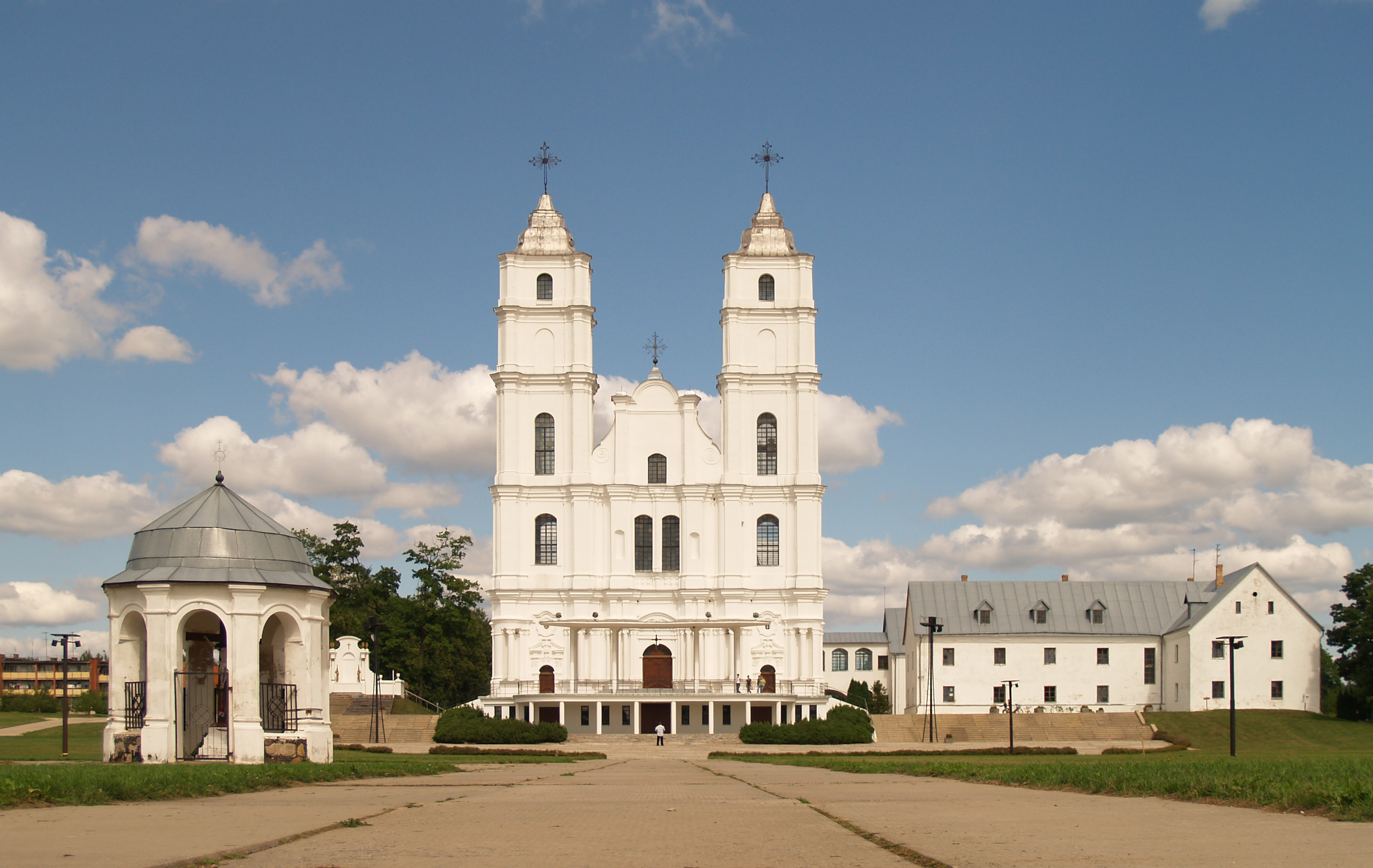
- Aglona Basilica

- Location in Latvia
- Coordinates: 56°08′N 27°01′E
- Country: Latvia
- Municipality: Preiļi Municipality
- Parish: Aglona Parish
- Elevation: 476 ft (145 m)

Population (2018)
  - Total: 874
- Time zone: UTC+2 (EET)
  - Summer (DST): UTC+3 (EEST)
- Postal code: LV-5304 Aglona

Aglona (Latgalian: Aglyuna, Lithuanian: Agluona, Russian: Аглона, hist. German: Aglohn) is a village in the Aglona Parish of Preiļi Municipality in the Latgale region of Latvia. It is located 40 kilometers (25 mi) northeast of the city of Daugavpils.

Located on the narrow strip of land between the lakes Cirišs and Egles, the present-day village is the result of merger of three settlements: Aglona, Somerseta and Jaunciems. The scenery of the surrounding area attracts visitors during the summer. Traditionally, many families from Russia spend their summers in the countryside near Aglona. The nearby Sacrifice Island (Latvian: Upursala), Devil's Lake (Latvian: Velnezers), and the Madelanu Castle Mound are among the most beautiful places in Latvia. The surrounding pine forests have suffered from excessive logging in recent years.

== History ==
Aglona is known for its Basilica of the Assumption — the most important Catholic church in the country. The church and monastery were founded by the Dominican fathers in 1700. The original wooden church and monastery were razed in the 1760s and construction for a new church was begun in 1768 and completed by 1800 when it was consecrated. It attracts tens of thousands of pilgrims every year on the day of the Assumption of Mary (15 August) as well as on Pentecost. The historic icon of the Aglona Mother of God is considered miraculous and has long been an object of veneration. Its dates to the 17th century and its authorship is unknown.

In 1980, the church celebrated its 200th anniversary and was officially given the status of a minor basilica by Pope John Paul II. In 1986, it was the site of celebration of the 800th anniversary of Christianity in Latvia. A major renovation of the basilica and expansion of the church grounds was begun in 1992 in preparation for the pope's visit. The shrine was visited by Pope John Paul II in September 1993 and over 300,000 pilgrims assembled at that time. Pope Francis visited in September 2018.

== See also ==
- List of cities in Latvia
- Basilica of the Assumption, Aglona
