= Zbigņevs Stankevičs =

Latvian prelate of the Catholic Church (born 1955)

The Most Reverend Zbigņevs Stankevičs
- Archbishop of Riga
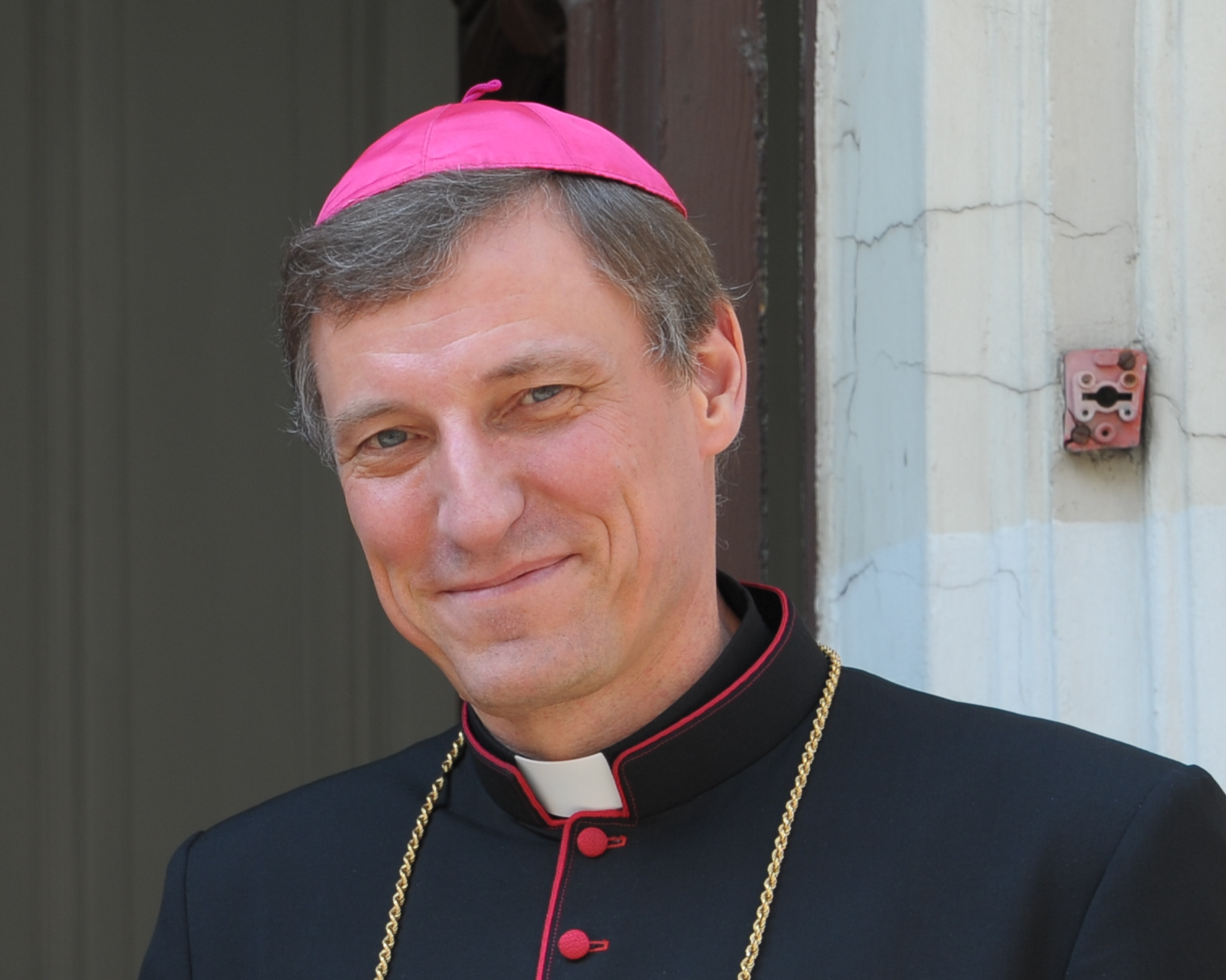
- Church: Roman Catholic
- Archdiocese: Riga
- Metropolis: Riga
- See: Riga
- Appointed: 19 June 2010
- Installed: 21 August 2010
- Predecessor: Cardinal Jānis Pujats

Orders
- Ordination: 16 June 1996 by Jānis Pujats
- Consecration: 8 August 2010 by Jānis Pujats

Personal details
- Born: Zbigņev Stankevičs; 15 February 1955 (age 71) Lejasciems, Latvia
- Occupation: Archbishop of Riga
- Motto: Fortitudo mea Dominus
- Coat of arms

Styles of Zbigņevs Stankevičs
- Reference style: The Most Reverend
- Spoken style: Your Excellency
- Religious style: Archbishop
- Posthumous style: not applicable

Zbigņevs Stankevičs (Polish: Zbigniew Stankiewicz; born 15 February 1955) is a Latvian Catholic prelate who has served as Archbishop of Riga since 2010. He previously served in leadership at the Seminary Institute of Religious Sciences in Riga.

== Ecclesiastical career ==
Stankevičs was born in Lejasciems into a family of Polish descent. In 1978, he obtained the Diploma in Engineering at the Riga Polytechnical Institute. He worked for 12 years prior to pursuing religious studies, first at a naval centre and then at a bank. At that time, he was Vice President of the 'Polish Union of Latvia'. After the fall of communism in Europe and the restoration of Latvian independence he entered the seminary in 1990 in Lublin, Poland. He studied philosophy and theology at the Catholic University of Lublin, receiving a Masters in Theology in 1996. He was ordained a priest on 16 June 1996 for the archdiocese of Riga.

After ordination he held the following positions: assistant priest of St Francis Parish in Riga (1996–2001), chaplain of the Missionary Sisters of Charity (1996–1999), Assistant Community charismatic "Effata", Spiritual Director Major Seminary of Riga (1999–2001).

From 2002 to 2008 he completed his studies in Rome at the Pontifical Lateran University, where he obtained his licentiate and doctorate summa cum laude in Fundamental Theology. During his stay in Rome, he was Director of the Blessed Pius IX Residence of the Pontifical Lateran University. In 2008, he became spiritual director of the Riga Major Seminary, director of the Institute of Religious Studies and assistant priest of Christ the King Parish in Riga.

In addition to Latvian and Polish, he also speaks Lithuanian, Russian, Italian and English, and knows French and German.

Pope Benedict XVI appointed him Archbishop of Riga on 19 June 2010. He was consecrated a bishop on 8 August 2010 by Cardinal Pujats, assisted by Archbishop Luigi Bonazzi, the apostolic nuncio to the Baltic states, and by Archbishop Józef Kowalczyk, the primate of Poland. The ceremony was held in the Evangelical Lutheran cathedral in Riga, which had been the Catholic cathedral prior to the Protestant Reformation, because the current seat of the Catholic Archdiocese, St. James Cathedral, was too small to accommodate invited dignitaries, including Latvian president Valdis Zatlers. He was installed in the St. James Cathedral on 21 August. Cardinal Joachim Meisner, Archbishop of Cologne, also attended.

On 12 June 2012 he was appointed a member of the Pontifical Council for Promoting Christian Unity for a five-year renewable term.

In October 2015, he attended the Synod of Bishops on the Family as the elected representative of the Episcopal Conference of Latvia.

Stankevičs is the Grand Prior of the Latvian Lieutenancy of the Equestrian Order of the Holy Sepulchre of Jerusalem.

== See also ==
- Roman Catholic Church of Latvia

Catholic Church titles
Preceded by Jānis Pujats	Archbishop of Riga; 19 June 2010–incumbent	Succeeded by incumbent
