= St. James's Cathedral, Riga =

St James' Cathedral
- The Metropolitan Cathedral of Saint James the Greater
- Svētā Jēkaba katedrāle
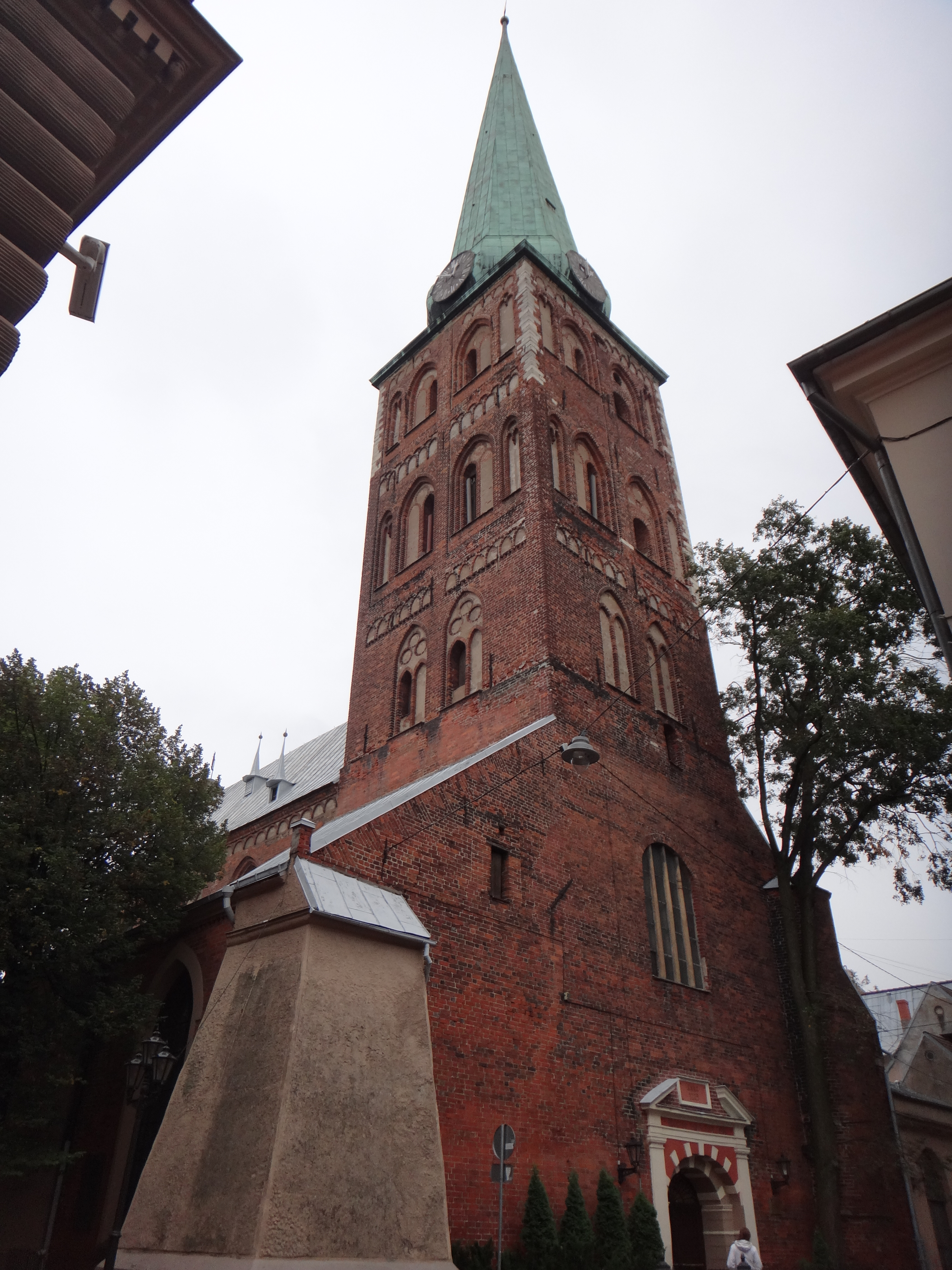
- The façade of St. James's Cathedral

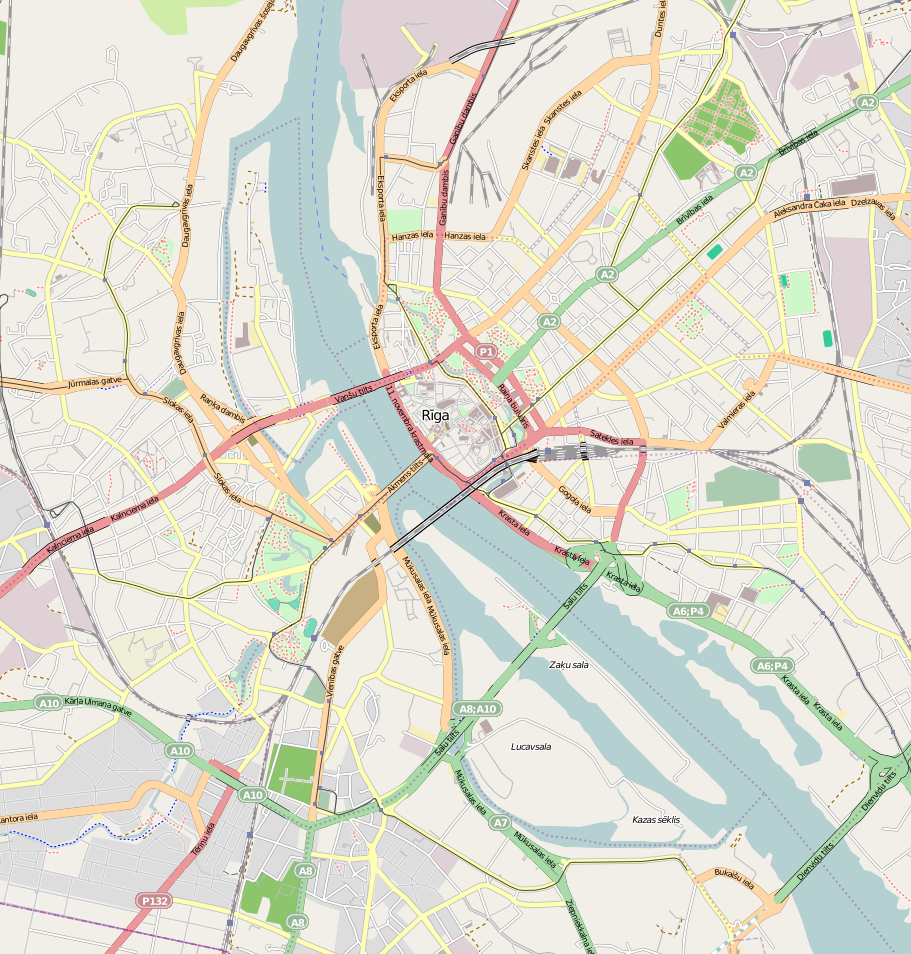
- Location within Riga
- 56°57′3″N 24°6′17″E
- Location: Riga, Jēkaba iela 9
- Country: Latvia
- Denomination: Roman Catholic
- Previous denomination: Roman Catholic (1225-1552; 1582-1621); Lutheran (1552-1582; 1621-1923)
- Website: Cathedral Website

History
- Status: Cathedral & Parish church
- Dedication: St James the Greater
- Consecrated: 1225

Architecture
- Functional status: Active
- Heritage designation: State Protected Cultural Monument
- Designated: 18 December 1998
- Architectural type: Church
- Style: Brick Gothic
- Years built: 1212-1225
- Groundbreaking: 13th century

Specifications
- Length: 50 m (164 ft 1 in)
- Width: 24 m (78 ft 9 in)
- Materials: Red bricks

Administration
- Archdiocese: Riga
- Parish: Svētā Jēkaba

Clergy
- Archbishop: Zbigņevs Stankevičs

St James's Cathedral (Latvian: Svētā Jēkaba katedrāle, German: Jakobskirche) is the Roman Catholic cathedral of Riga in Latvia. The cathedral is dedicated to Saint James the Greater. The building is part of the Old Riga UNESCO World Heritage Site and lies directly opposite the House of the Livonian Noble Corporation, the meeting place of Latvia's parliament the Saeima.

The church is sometimes called St. Jacob's. English, unlike most languages, uses different names for the Old Testament name Jacob and the New Testament name James.

== History ==
The church building was dedicated in 1225. It was not originally a cathedral since the Rīgas Doms served that function. At the beginning of the 15th century the Holy Cross Chapel was built at the south end of the early Gothic church, and part of the church was transformed into a basilica.

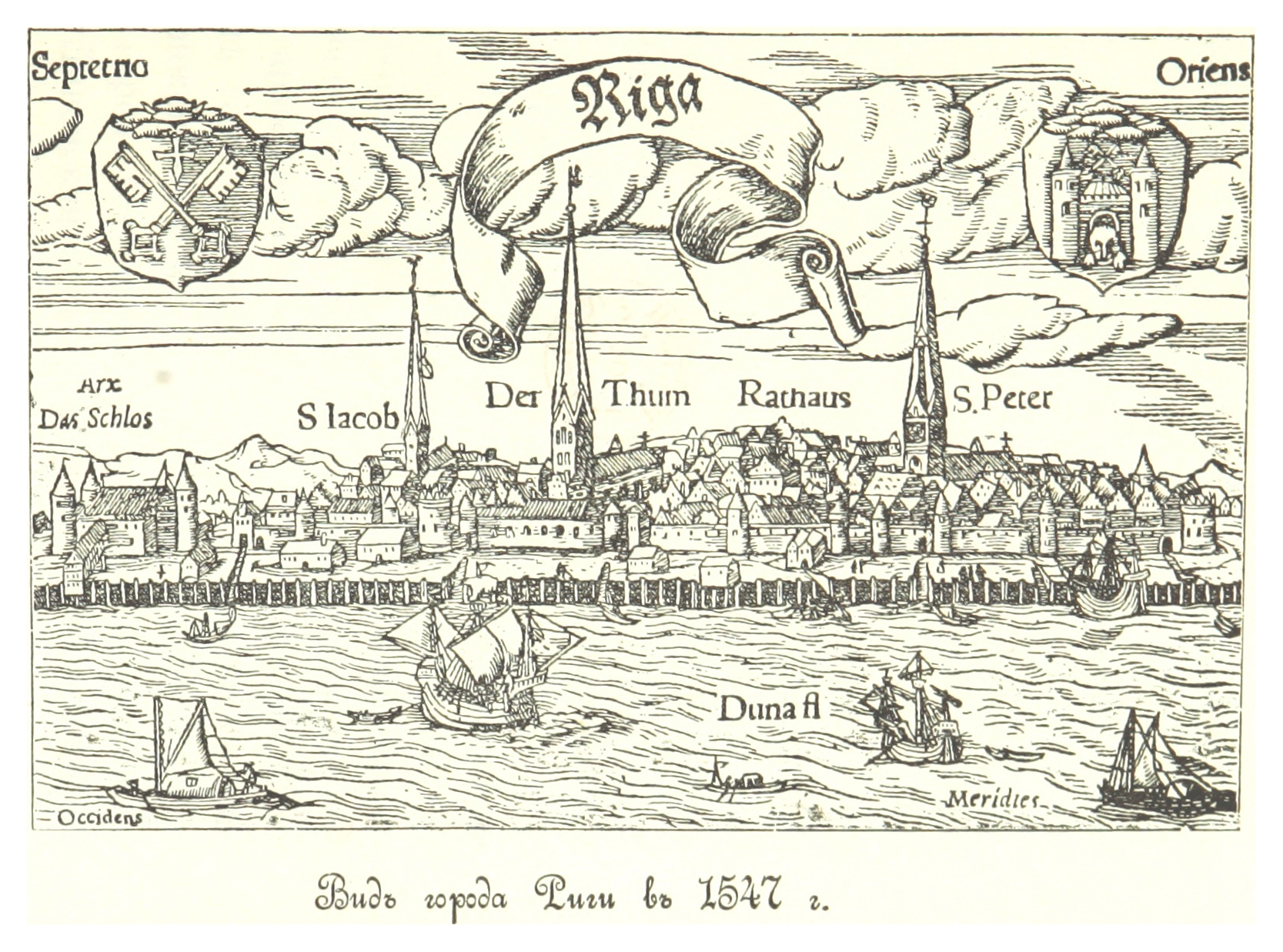
Riga in 1547 - The three church towers: St. James’s Church; Riga Cathedral; St. Peter's Church

In 1522 during the Protestant Reformation the building became the second German language Lutheran church in Riga. In 1523 it became the first Latvian language Lutheran church there.

In 1582 it was given to the Jesuits as part of the Counter-Reformation when Stephen Báthory of the Polish–Lithuanian Commonwealth gained control of Riga. In 1621 it was returned to the Lutherans after Gustav II Adolf of Sweden occupied Riga. At various times it served as a Swedish language, German language, or Estonian language Lutheran church. After the Russian occupation of 1710, the church was named The Crown Church however religious services in the German language were allowed to continue. In 1812 it was used as a storehouse for flour bags and other food supplies by Napoleon's troops. During that time, from June to November 1812, the congregation held services at St Peter's Church.

In 1901 the oldest Baroque altar in Riga, from 1680, was replaced by a new one. Following the 1923 Latvian church property referendum, the building was given to the Catholics for use as their cathedral. The first Catholic mass was held on 3 May 1924 by the Catholic Archbishop of Riga Antonijs Springovičs. The Catholic parish of St James was created by Archbishop Antonijs Springovičs on April 18, 1947. This establishment of the parish was intended to be national congregation without a specific territory, consisting of Latvian Catholics in and around Riga, as well as English and French Catholics.

The cathedral was visited by Pope John Paul II in 1993 and by Pope Francis in 2018.

== Gallery ==
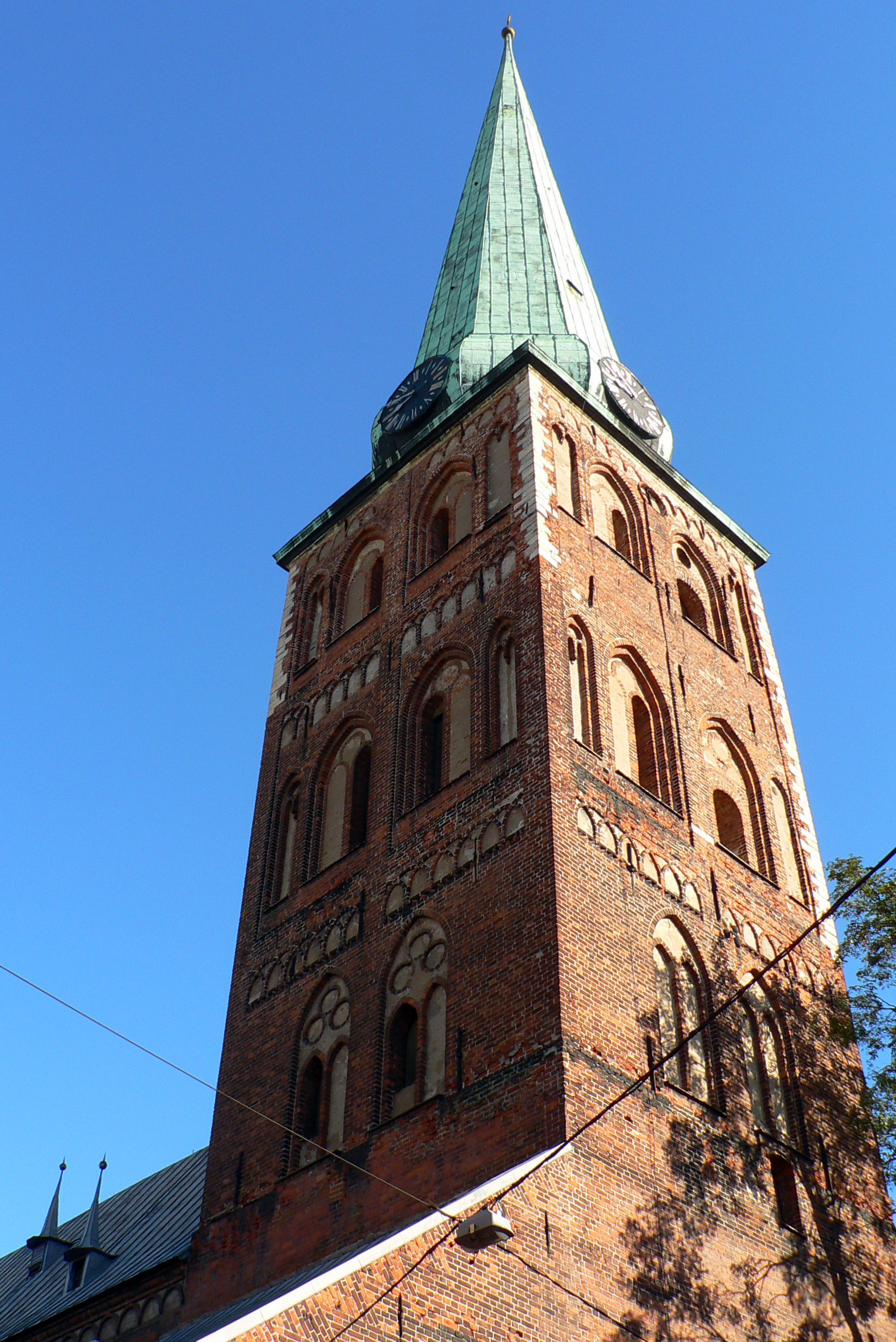
Clock tower

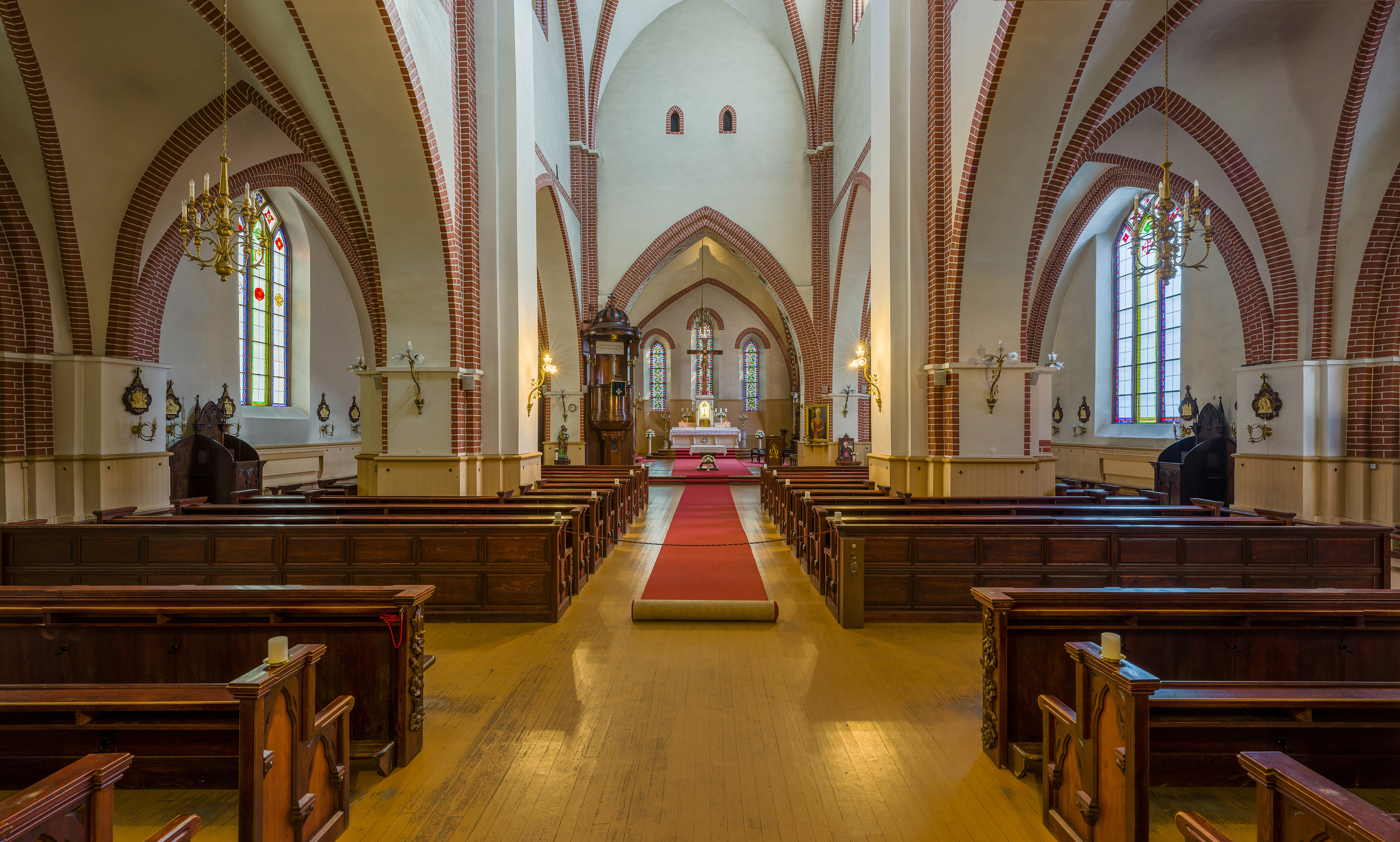
Interior of the cathedral

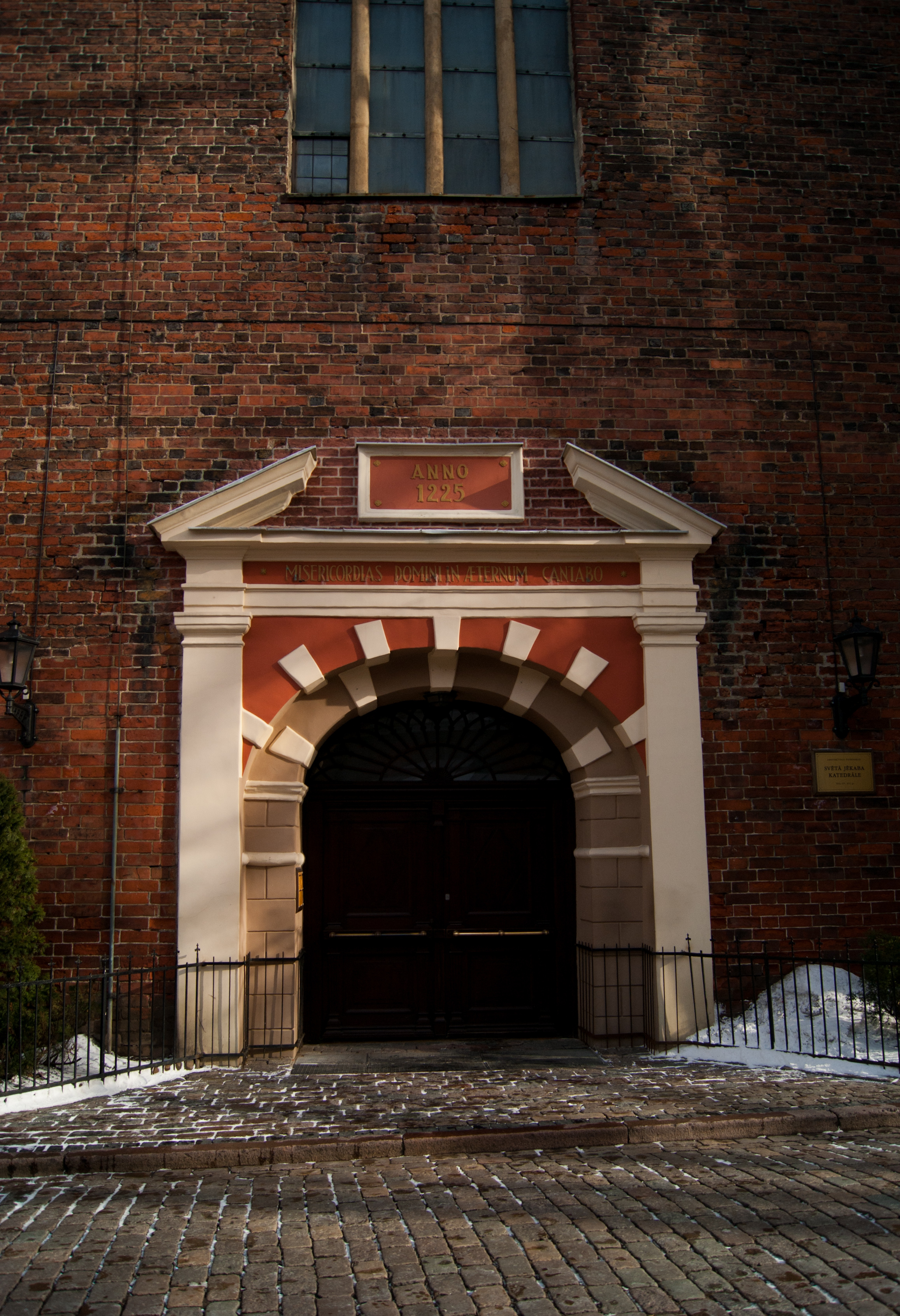
Main portal

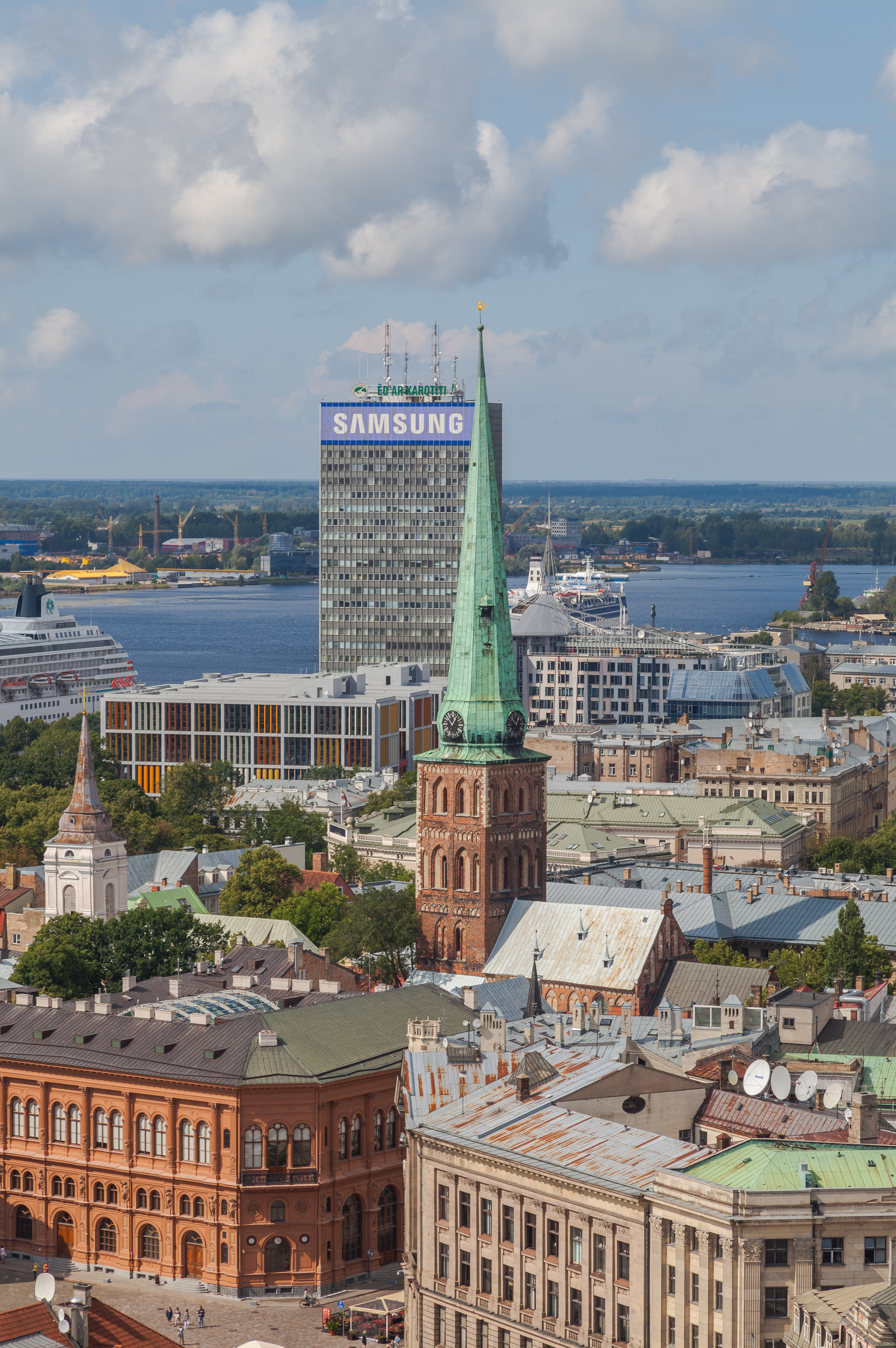
From St. Peter's Church steeple

== See also ==
- Roman Catholic Archdiocese of Riga
- Concordat of 1922
- List of Jesuit sites

== Sources ==
- (in Latvian) Svētā Jēkaba katedrāle at catholic.lv
