= Archdiocese of Riga =

Latin Catholic archdiocese in Latvia

Coordinates: 56.9508°N 24.1047°E

Archdiocese of Riga Archidioecesis Rigensis Rīgas arhidiecēze
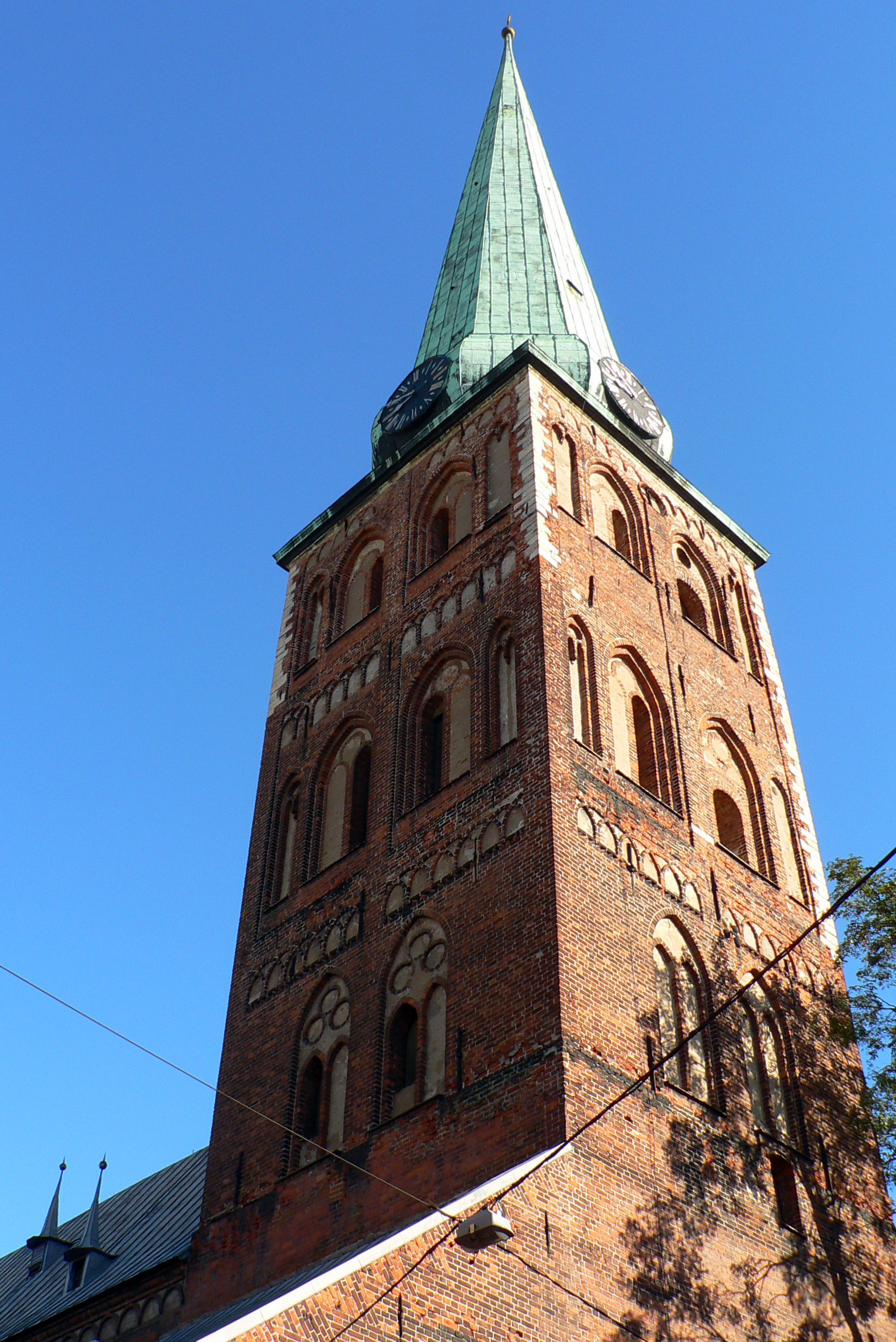
- The Metropolitan Cathedral Basilica of St James in Riga

Location
- Country: Latvia
- Ecclesiastical province: Riga

Statistics
- Area: 23,587 km^{2} (9,107 sq mi)
- Population: Total; Catholics: (as of 2020); 1,182,100; 207,560 (17.6%)

Information
- Sui iuris church: Latin Church
- Rite: Roman Rite
- Cathedral: Svētā Jēkaba Katedrāle (Cathedral Basilica of St. James)

Current leadership
- Pope: Leo XIV
- Metropolitan Archbishop: Zbigņevs Stankevičs
- Auxiliary Bishops: Andris Kravalis
- Bishops emeritus: Jānis Pujats (cardinal); Jānis Cakuls (auxiliary)

Map
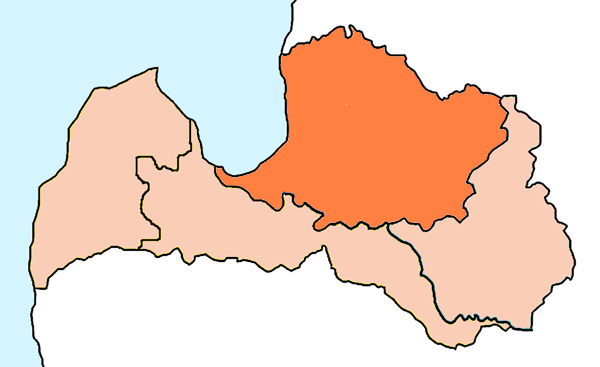
- Location of Archdiocese of Riga in Latvia

The Archdiocese of Riga, formerly the Diocese of Üxküll, is a Latin Catholic archdiocese with its seat in Riga, the capital city of Latvia. Its cathedral is St. James's Cathedral. It is a metropolitan archdiocese with the three suffragan dioceses, namely Jelgava, Liepāja, Rēzekne-Aglona which constitute the Ecclesiastical Province of Riga.

== History ==
- 1186: Established as Diocese of Üxküll
- 1 October 1188: Designated a suffragan of the Archdiocese of Bremen
- 1202: Renamed as Diocese of Riga
- 20 January 1255: Promoted as Archdiocese of Riga
- 1561: Suppressed
- 1582-1798 : Part of the Diocese of Inflanty
- 22 September 1918: Restored as Diocese of Riga from the Archdiocese of Mohilev in the territory of Vidzeme, Latgale, and Estonia
- 9 June 1920: Added territory of Courland and Zemgale from Diocese of Samogitia
- 25 October 1923: Promoted as Archdiocese of Riga
- 1 November 1924: Lost territory to new Apostolic Administration of Estonia
- 8 May 1937: Promoted as Metropolitan Archdiocese of Riga; lost territory to new Diocese of Liepāja
- 2 December 1995: Lost territory to new Diocese of Rēzekne–Aglona

== Bishops, Apostolic Administrators and Archbishops of Riga ==
Bishopric of Livonia (Bishopric of Üxküll) 1186–1255
1186–1196	Saint Meinhard
1196–1198	Berthold of Hanover
1199–1202	Albert of Riga
Bishopric of Riga 1202–1255
1202–1229	Albert of Riga
1229–1253	Nikolaus von Nauen
1245–1255	Albert Suerbeer
Archbishopric of Riga 1255–1561
1255–1273	Albert Suerbeer
1273–1284	Johannes I of Lune
1285–1294	Johannes II of Vechten
1294–1300	Johannes III of Schwerin
1300–1302	Isarnus Tacconi of Fontiès-d'Aude
1303–1310	Jens Grand titular, never came to Riga
1304–1341	Friedrich von Pernstein
1341–1347	Engelbert von Dolen
1348–1369	Bromhold von Vyffhusen
1370–1374	Siegfried Blomberg
1374–1393	Johannes IV von Sinten
1393–1418	Johannes V von Wallenrodt
1418–1424	Johannes VI Ambundi
1424–1448	Henning Scharpenberg
1448–1479	Silvester Stodewescher
1479–1484	Sede vacante
1484–1509	Michael Hildebrand
1509–1524	Jasper Linde
1524–1527	Johannes VII Blankenfeld
1528–1539	Thomas Schöning
1539–1563	Wilhelm von Brandenburg

Later suppressed

=== Diocese of Riga ===
Erected: 22 September 1918

- Bishop Eduard O’Rourke (29 Sep 1918 – 10 Apr 1920)
- Bishop Antonijs Springovičs (14 Apr 1920 – 25 Oct 1923) (As Bishop of Riga)

=== Archdiocese of Riga ===
Elevated: 25 October 1923

- Archbishop Antonijs Springovičs (25 Oct 1923 – 1 Oct 1958) (As Archbishop of Riga)
- Bishop Pēteris Strods (1 Oct 1958 – 5 Aug 1960) (Apostolic Administrator)
- Cardinal Julijans Vaivods (10 Nov 1964 – 24 May 1990) (Apostolic Administrator)
- Bishop John IV Cakuls (23 May 1990 – 8 May 1991) (Apostolic Administrator)
- Cardinal John V Pujats (8 May 1991 – 19 Jun 2010)
- Archbishop Zbigņevs Stankevičs (19 Jun 2010 – )

== Suffragan dioceses ==
- Jelgava
- Liepāja
- Rēzekne-Aglona

== See also ==
- Roman Catholicism in Latvia
- Concordat of 1922

== Sources ==
- GCatholic.org
- Catholic Hierarchy
