= 1931 Latvian Riga Cathedral referendum =

- 5–6 September 1931

Results
Choice	Votes	%
Yes	380,714	97.87%
No	8,267	2.13%
Valid votes	388,981	99.70%
Invalid or blank votes	1,179	0.30%
Total votes	390,160	100.00%
Registered voters/turnout	1,217,914	32.04%

A referendum on the transfer of Riga Cathedral to the Lutheran Church was held in Latvia on 5 and 6 September 1931. Although 80% of those voting voted in favour, they represented only 32% of registered voters, and the referendum required 50% of registered voters to vote in favour for the proposal to pass. However, the unusually high turnout demonstrated the scale of nationalist mobilisation, and later the same month the government issued an ordinance that divided administrative authority among the three Lutheran communities but effectively gave control to the two Latvian communities.

== Background ==
In 1923 the Latvian government had assigned St. James Church to the Catholic Church. A referendum in September that year against the expropriation, as although a large majority voted against, voter turnout was below the quorum required. The Latvian Lutheran congregation ("Friedensgemeinde") of the church was granted the right to use the cathedral through an agreement with the German congregation that owned it. A few years later, another Latvian congregation (the garrison congregation) was granted the same rights. The Lutheran bishop was also granted the right to use the church under this same 1923 law.

Beginning in 1930, people began to challenge the church's exclusive right to property and gained the support of several political parties to bring the church under state control. Although the Saeima rejected the proposal, a sufficient number of signatures were collected to organise a referendum, in accordance with the constitution.

== Results ==
Choice	Votes	%
For	380,714	97.87
Against	8,267	2.13
Total	388,981	100.00
Valid votes	388,981	99.70
Invalid/blank votes	1,179	0.30
Total votes	390,160	100.00
Registered voters/turnout	1,217,914	32.04
Source: Direct Democracy

== Aftermath ==
The affair led to a breakdown in relations between the Latvians and the German minority. The German community decided to leave the cathedral in protest. Similarly, to protest against state interference in church affairs, the Latvian Lutheran bishop Irbe resigned. The outcome of the referendum led to an increase in the popularity of nationalists parties in the parliamentary elections in October.
