= David Caspari =

German Lutheran theologian (1648–1702)

David Caspari (5 March 1648 – 28 February 1702) was a German Lutheran theologian. He was the father of Georg Caspari.

Born in Königsberg, Duchy of Prussia, Caspari studied at the Albertina and the universities of Jena, Wittenberg, Leipzig, Altdorf, Strassburg, and Helmstedt. He became sub-inspector at the Albertina in 1676. Two years later he was appointed rector of Riga Cathedral's school. Caspari died in Riga as the school's superintendent.

== Works ==
- De Vita Dei, Qualis ea sit ex Mente Graecorum et Potissimum Aristotelis (Jena, 1673)
- De Quaestione an Virtus Cadat in Deum (Königsberg, 1677)
- De Futuri Theologi Studiis Philologicis et Philosophicis (edited by Georg Caspari, 1705)
- Breviarium Theologiae Moralis (edited by Georg Caspari, 1712)
