= 1923 Latvian church property referendum =

- 1–2 September 1923
- Law on the allocation of cathedral churches in Riga to the Evangelical Lutheran Bishop and the Catholic Bishop of Latvia.: 1. The Evangelical Lutheran Bishop of Latvia is granted the right to use the Cathedral Church in Riga with the buildings and squares belonging to it. The Catholic bishop is given the St. James's Church in Riga as the cathedral of the Catholic bishop.; 2. The Catholic bishop is given the properties in Riga belonging to the state for the needs of the bishop and his chapter: Kleine Schlosstrasse 2, Klosterstrasse 2, 4, 17 and 19 (I. Hyp. Bez. No. 82) handed over with the Alexei Church and all its associated buildings.; 3. The actual transfer of the properties mentioned in points 1 and 2 to the Evangelical-Lutheran bishop for use and to the Catholic bishop is assigned to the Minister of the Interior.

Results
Choice	Votes	%
Yes	205,036	99.73%
No	550	0.27%
Valid votes	205,586	99.93%
Invalid or blank votes	150	0.07%
Total votes	205,736	100.00%
Registered voters/turnout	963,257	21.36%

A referendum on the transfer of church property was held in Latvia on 1 and 2 September 1923, the first time a referendum had been held in the country. Voters were asked whether the government should be stopped from transferring the Lutheran St James's Church in Riga to the Roman Catholic Church. Although a large majority voted for the proposal, voter turnout was well below the level required, and the church building was subsequently given to the Catholic Church.

== Background ==
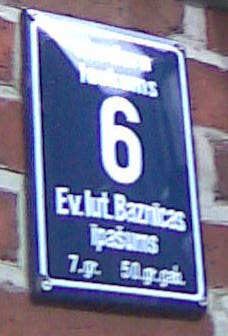
A plaque marking Lutheran church property at Rīgas Doms (Riga Lutheran cathedral), Herdera laukums 6.

The government led by Prime Minister Zigfrīds Anna Meierovics had started legislating for the transfer of Baltic German St James's Church to the Roman Catholic Church as well as forcing the Lutheran Church to share Riga Cathedral with the Catholics. The moves were vigorously opposed by Paul Schiemann, a prominent defender of minority rights, who claimed the bill would "abandon the principles of a state of culture and law" during a parliamentary debate.

Schiemann attracted international sympathy for the Lutheran Church's fight, and managed to force the country's first ever referendum. However, supporters of the transfer called for a boycott of the referendum.

== Results ==
Choice	Votes	%
For	205,036	99.7
Against	550	0.3
Invalid/blank votes	150	–
Total	205,736	100
Registered voters/turnout	963,257	21.4
Source: Nohlen & Stöver

== Aftermath ==
Although the referendum was passed by a large margin, turnout was just 21.4%. The referendum had required 400,000 to vote in favour for it to succeed, but achieved only just over half the number.

Subsequently, the church building was given over to the Roman Catholic Church, who took it over as their cathedral the following May. The Lutherans were also forced to share Riga Cathedral with the Catholics.

== See also ==
- Article 7 of the Concordat of 1922
- 1931 Latvian Riga Cathedral referendum
