= Museum of the History of Riga and Navigation =

Museum in Riga, Latvia

- Rīgas vēstures un kuģniecības muzejs
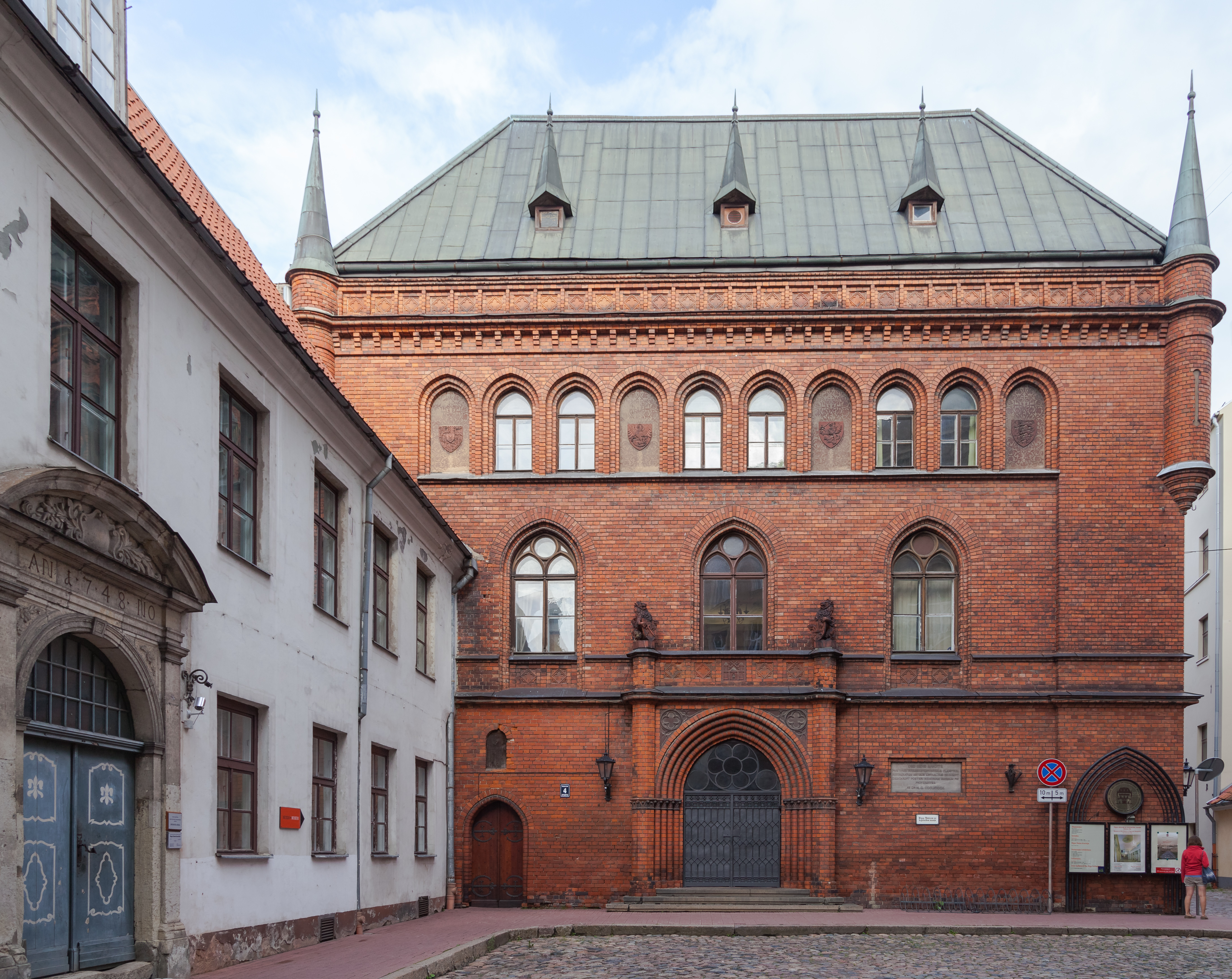
- Exterior of the museum building
- Location: Palasta iela 4, Riga, Latvia
- Coordinates: 56.948719°N 24.103832°E
- Website: www.rigamuz.lv

Museum of the History of Riga and Navigation (Latvian: Rīgas vēstures un kuģniecības muzejs) is housed by the Riga Dom Cathedral ensemble in the heart of the Old Riga, Latvia. It originated in 1773 as a private collection of Nikolaus von Himsel, a Riga doctor. It is the oldest museum in the Baltic States. Being one of the oldest museums in Europe, over the centuries it has grown into the largest collection of material evidence of the history of Riga.

== The Premises ==
During the reconstruction of the Riga Dom Cathedral in the 1890s, part of the former monastery was converted to serve the needs of the Dom Museum. It is the first building in the history of Riga to have been built for a museum, and the inscription on the museum front bears testimony to this. Within the premises there is the Column Hall, built in 1778 in the Classicism style, which housed the library until 1891. The hall is now being used for conferences and a historical 18th—19th centuries exhibition. The Column Hall faces the 13th century groin vaulted gallery and the Riga Dom Cathedral yard, a remarkable Romanesque and Gothic monument of the kind in the Baltic states. The Riga Dom Cathedral ensemble itself is an aesthetic treat that provides information about different periods in the construction of Riga.

== Exhibitions ==
The museum's exhibitions document the history of Riga from tits early settlements and the development of its port in the 12th and 13th centuries, through the period of Hansa League from the 13th to the16th centuries, as well as Polish and Swedish rule in the 16th and 17th centuries. The museum also presents an exhibition of life in Riga during the period of Latvian independence from 1918 to 1940, as well as the history of Latvian navigation from ancient times to our days. The museum's collections comprise approximately 500,000 objects, including engravings depicting Riga, maps and plans, silver and porcelain, ship models, navigational instruments, clothing household objects and decorative items. Its temporary and permanent exhibitions, together with its collections cover the history of Riga from its earliest settlement to the present day.

== Gallery ==
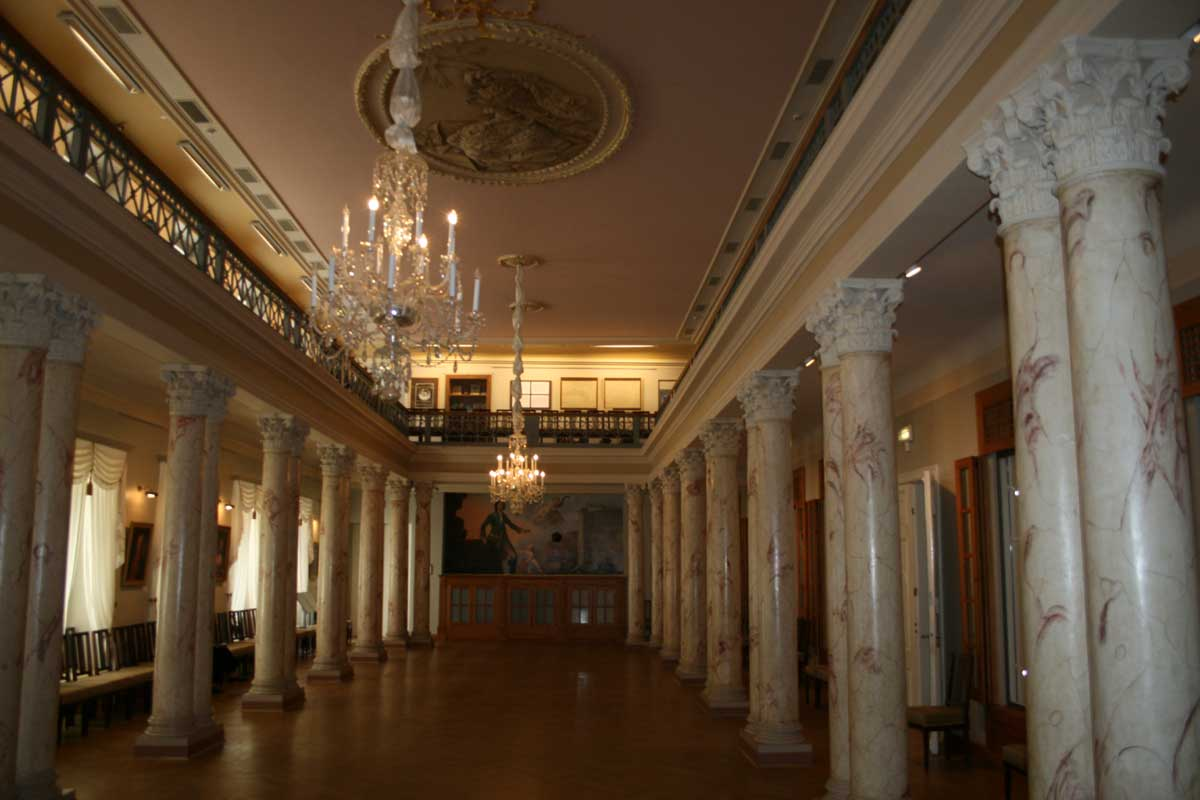
Column Hall of the museum

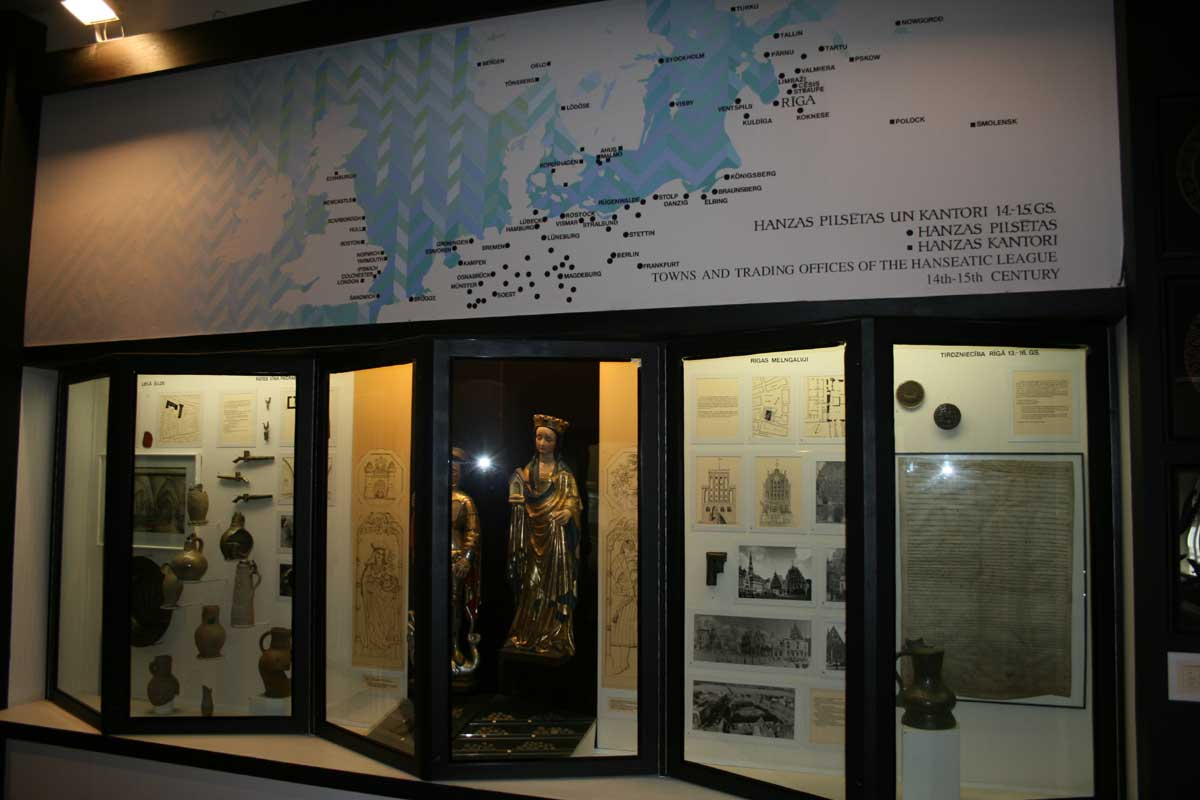
Exhibition window with items from the period of the Hanseatic League

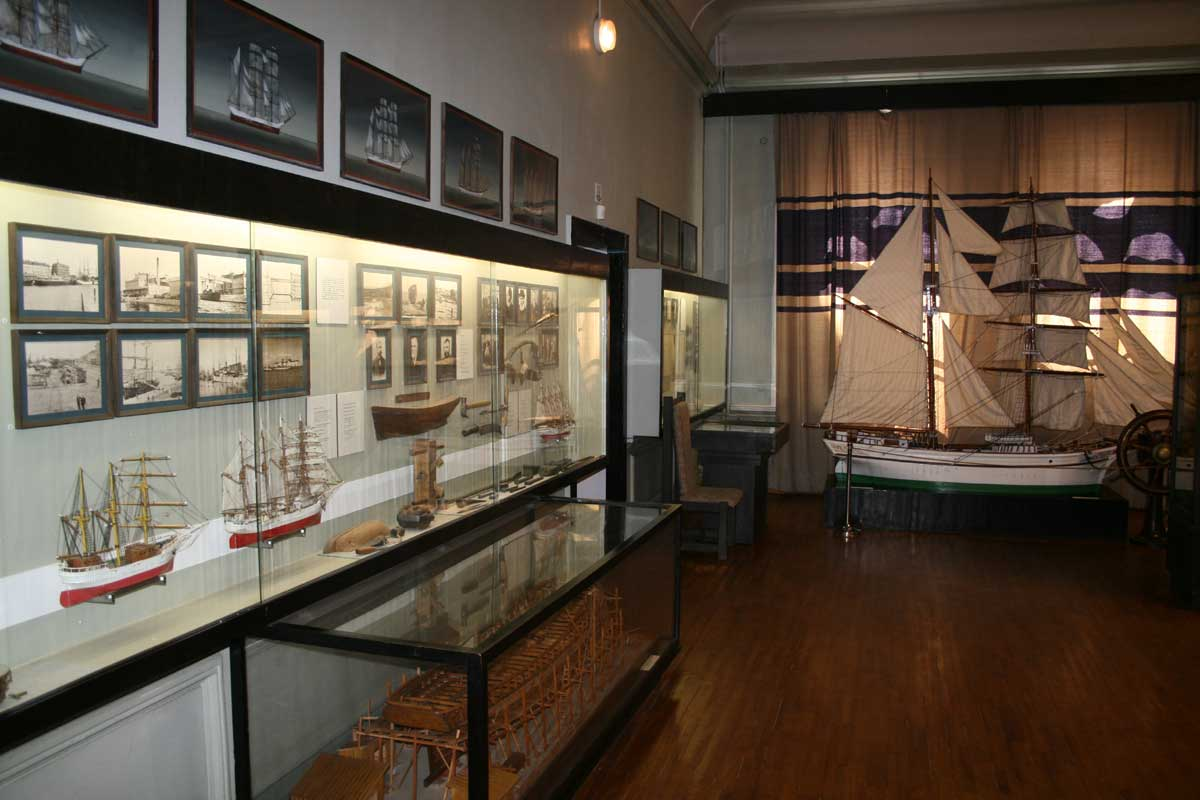
Navigation history exhibition
