= Georg Caspari =

Baltic German academic

Georg Caspari (17 April 1683 – 12 April 1743) was a Baltic German academic.

Caspari was born in Riga, in Swedish Livonia, as the son of David Caspari, rector of Riga Cathedral. He studied at the University of Rostock, where he published De Descensu Christi ad Inferos in 1704 and De Testamentis Divinis in 1705. Caspari also published some of his father's papers after his death in 1702. After living for a while in Greifswald, Caspari returned to Riga in 1723 and served at the cathedral. He died in his hometown.
