= Siege of Riga =

Siege of Riga may refer to:

- Siege of Riga (1621)
- Siege of Riga (1656)
- Siege of Riga (1700)
- Siege of Riga (1709–1710), culminating in the Capitulation of Estonia and Livonia
- Siege of Riga (1812)
