= Riga Cathedral =

Cathedral in Riga, Latvia

- The Cathedral of Saint Mary
- Rīgas Doms
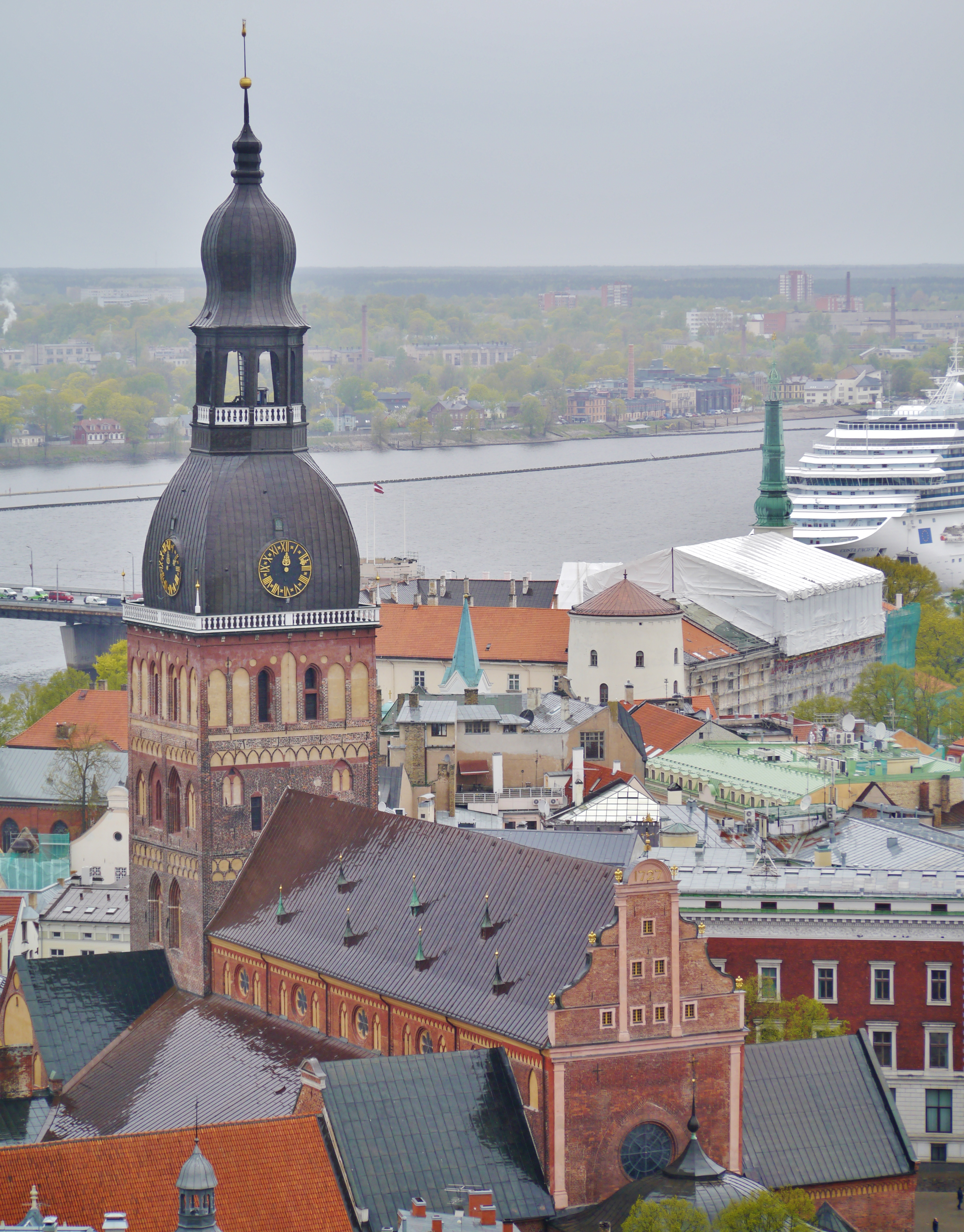
- Riga Cathedral with Riga Castle and Daugava River in the background

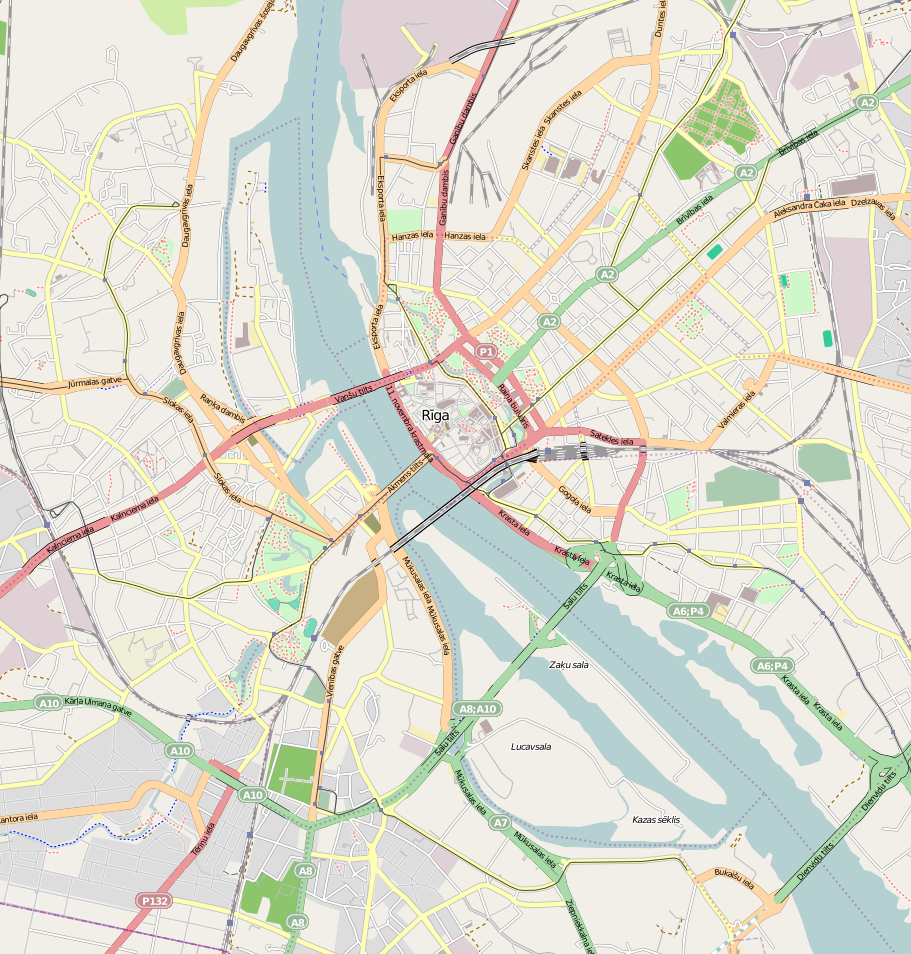
- Location within Riga
- 56°56′57″N 24°6′16″E
- Location: Riga
- Country: Latvia
- Denomination: Lutheran
- Previous denomination: Roman Catholic
- Website: doms.lv

History
- Founded: 25 June 1211
- Founder: Albert of Riga
- Dedication: Virgin Mary

Clergy
- Archbishop: Jānis Vanags
- Dean: Elijs Godiņš
- Pastor: Sandis Ratnieks

Riga Cathedral (Latvian: Rīgas Doms; German: Dom zu Riga) formally The Cathedral Church of Saint Mary, is the Evangelical Lutheran cathedral in Riga, Latvia. It is the seat of the Archbishop of Riga.

The cathedral is one of the most recognizable landmarks in Latvia, and is featured in or the subject of paintings, photographs and television travelogues. Like all of the oldest churches of the city, it is known for its weathercock.

The church is commonly called the Dome Cathedral, a pleonasm as the word 'Dome' comes from the German Dom meaning 'cathedral'.

== History and architecture ==
The church was built near the River Daugava in 1211 by Livonian Bishop Albert of Riga, who came from Lower Saxony in northwestern Germany. It is considered the largest medieval church in the Baltic states. It has undergone many modifications in the course of its history.

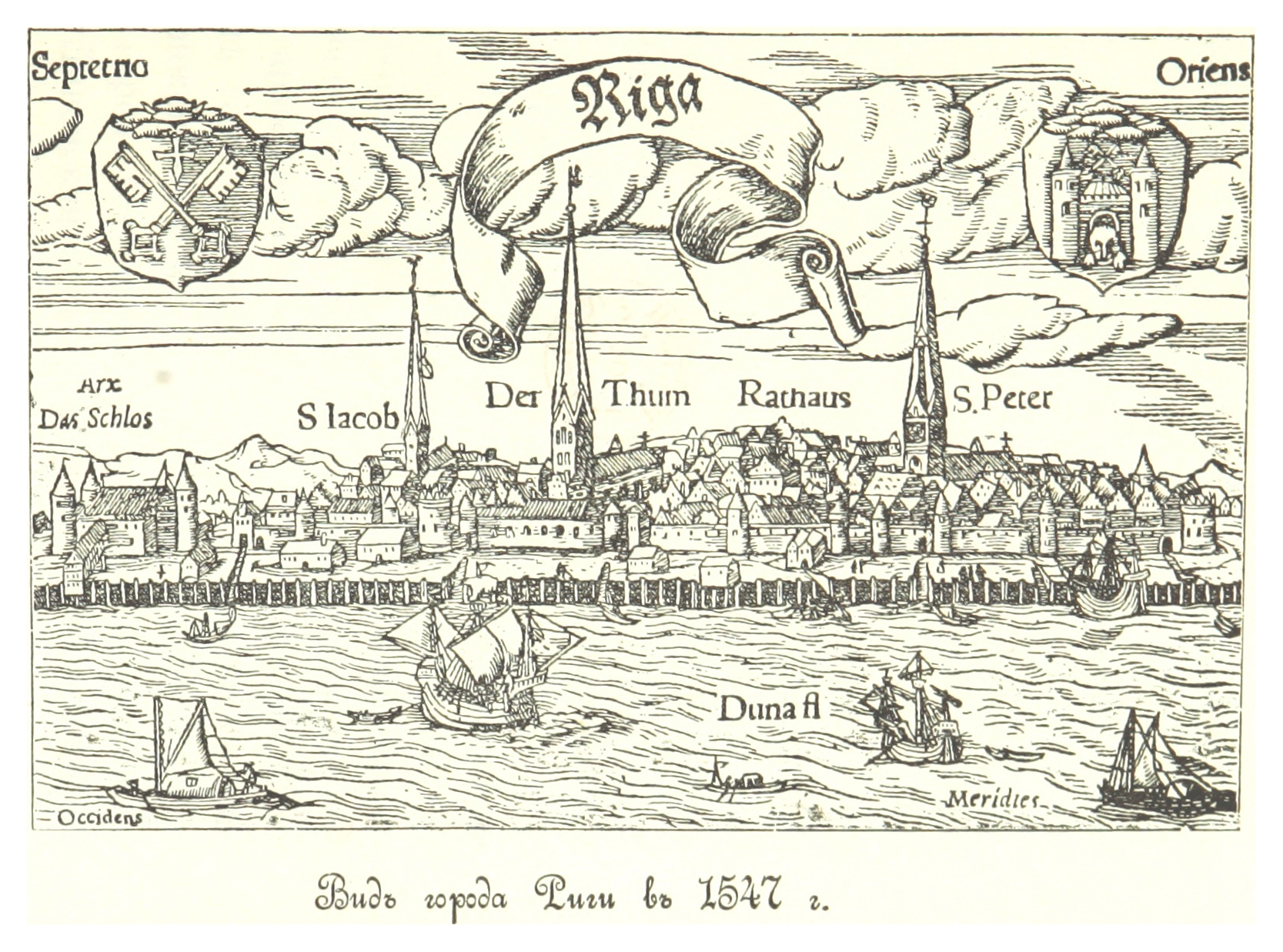
Riga skyline in 1547 – The three church towers: St. James's Church, Riga Cathedral, St. Peter's Church

David Caspari was rector of the cathedral school in the late 17th century. His son Georg Caspari also served at the cathedral.

Following a 1923 referendum the Lutheran Church had been forced to share the cathedral with the Roman Catholic Church, but this was reversed in the 1931 Latvian Riga Cathedral referendum, returning it to the Lutheran Church.

Religious services were prohibited during the Soviet occupation from 1939 to 1989, and the cathedral was used as a concert hall. The Museum of the History of Riga and Navigation was located in the southern wing of the cathedral. The cathedral was reopened for religious services in 1991, and is used by the Evangelical Lutheran Church of Latvia.

In 2011 the copper roofing above the nave was replaced. In 2015 the tower exterior was also re-plated and its wooden support structure renewed.

== Pipe organ ==
The organ of the Riga Cathedral was built by Walcker Orgelbau of Ludwigsburg, Baden-Württemberg, Germany, in 1882–83, and was inaugurated on 31 January 1884. It has four manuals and one pedalboard. It plays 116 voices, 124 stops, 144 ranks, and 6718 pipes. It includes 18 combinations and General Crescendo. A tape of Latvian composer Lūcija Garūta playing the organ for a cantata during World War II captured the sound of battle nearby.

== Boys choir ==
The Riga Dom Cathedral Boys Choir has performed internationally, recording the Riga Mass by Uģis Prauliņš and other works.

== Gallery ==
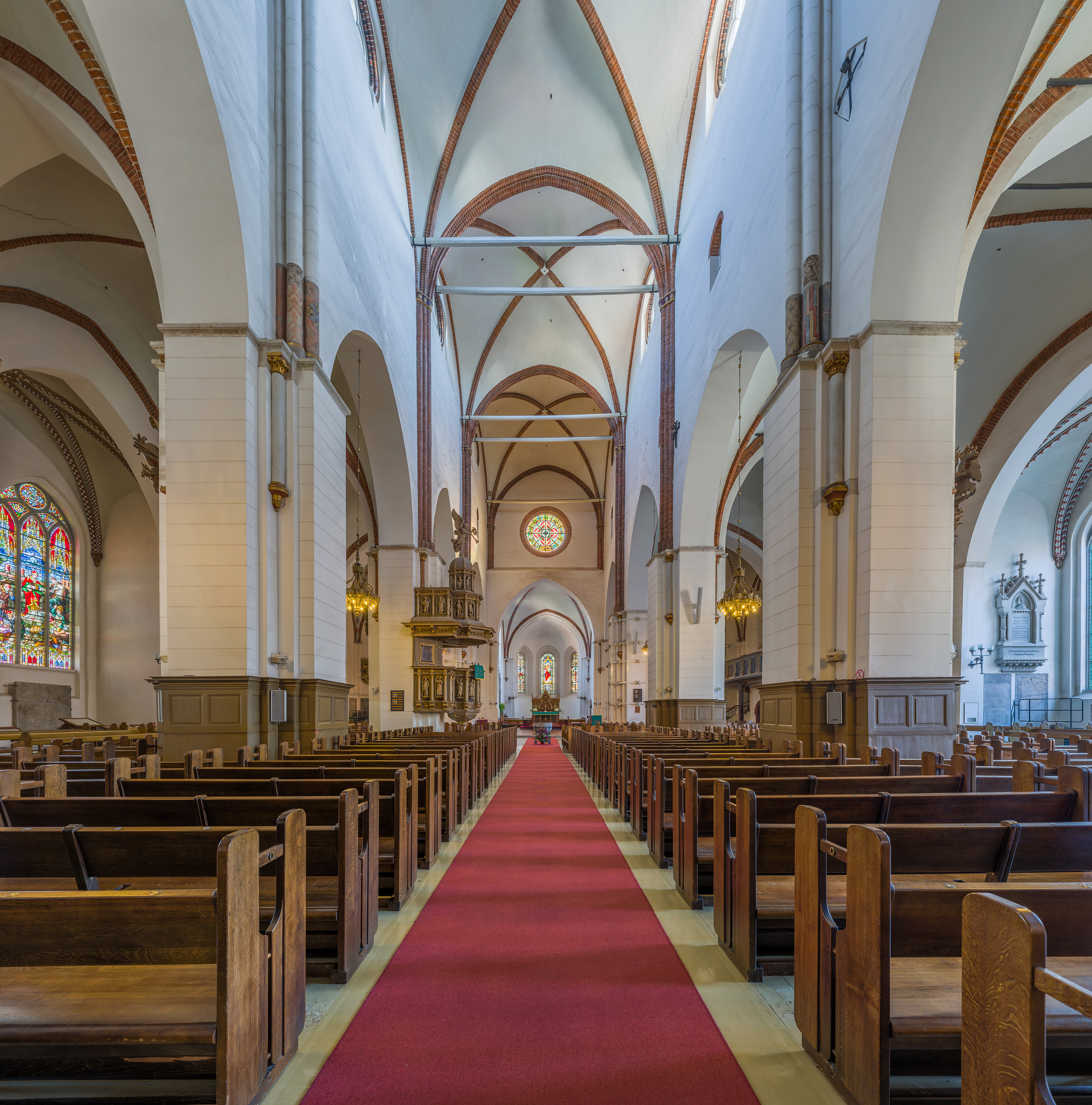
Cathedral nave

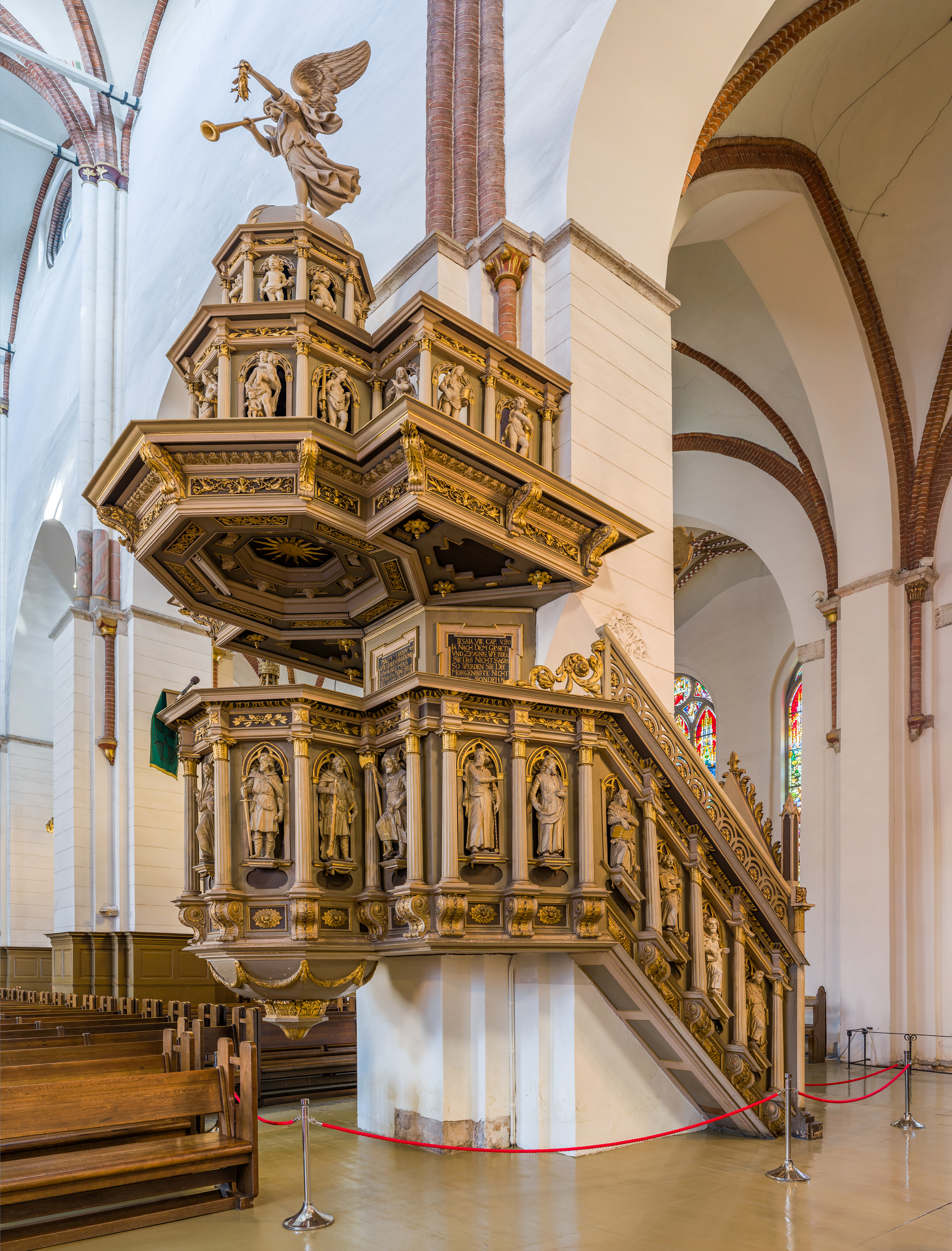
Pulpit

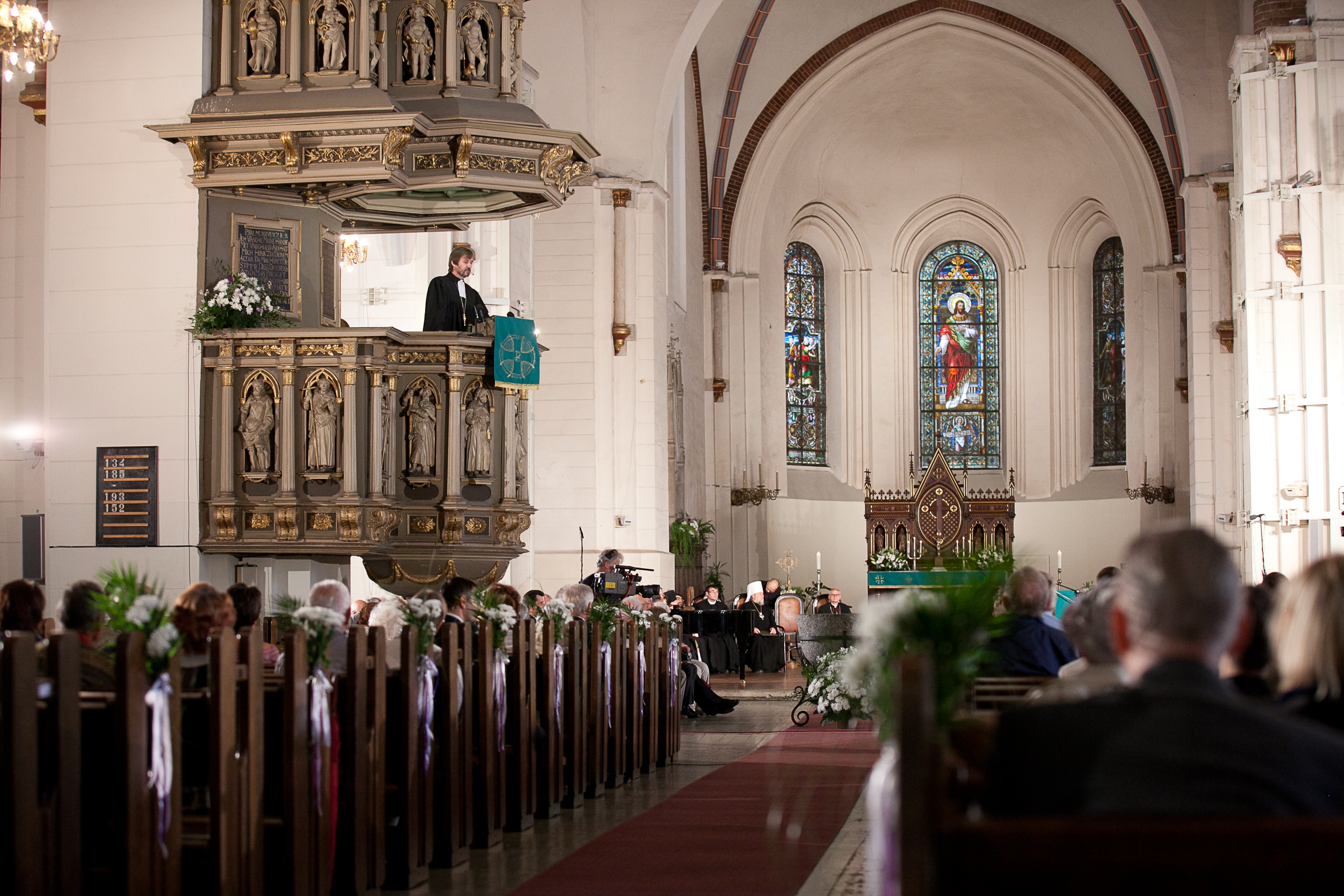
Archbishop of Riga Jānis Vanags participating in an ecumenical service

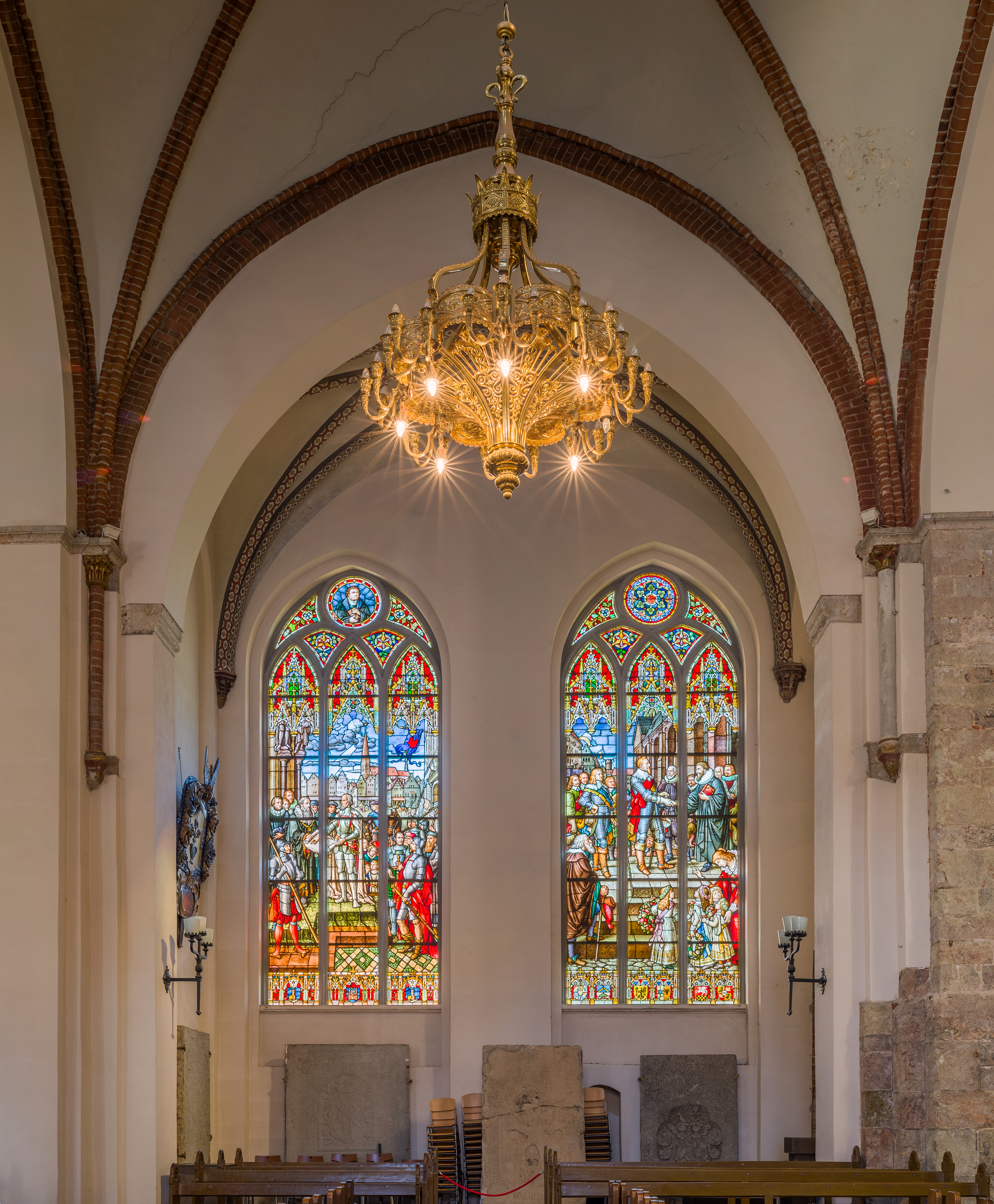
Wolter von Plettenberg (left) reading an edict of religious freedom in 1525, Gustavus Adolphus of Sweden (right) in 1621

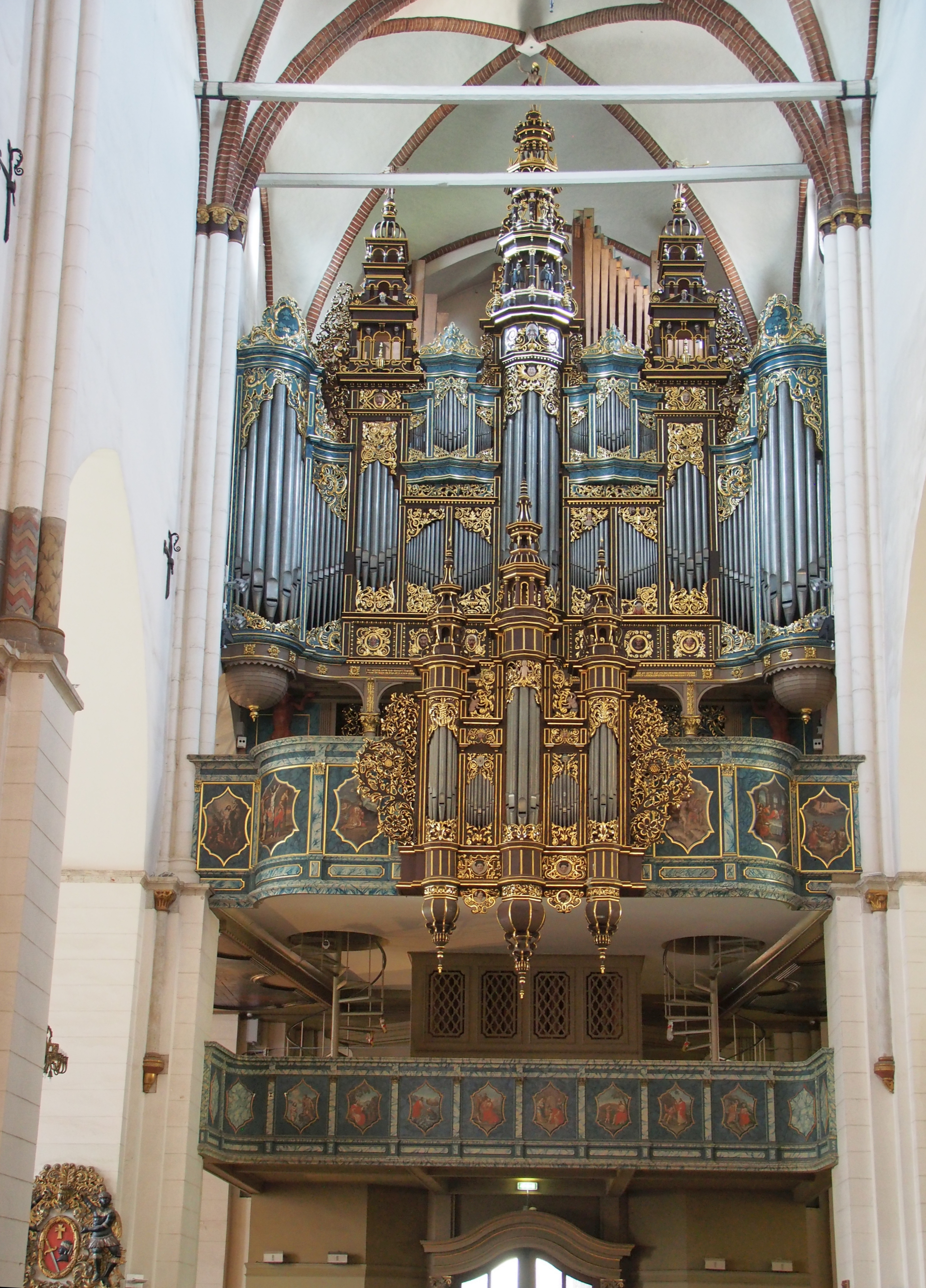
Organ

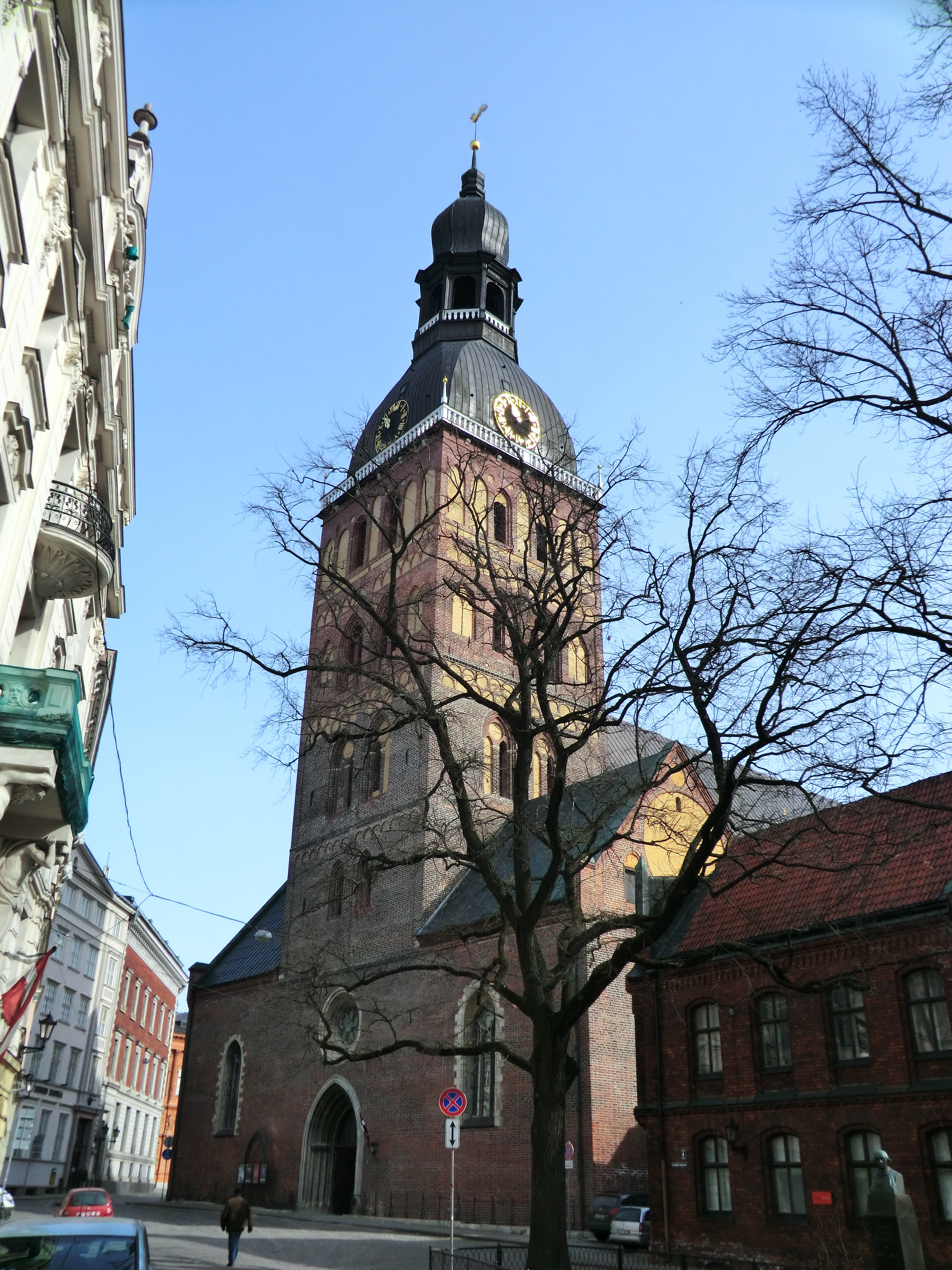
Façade

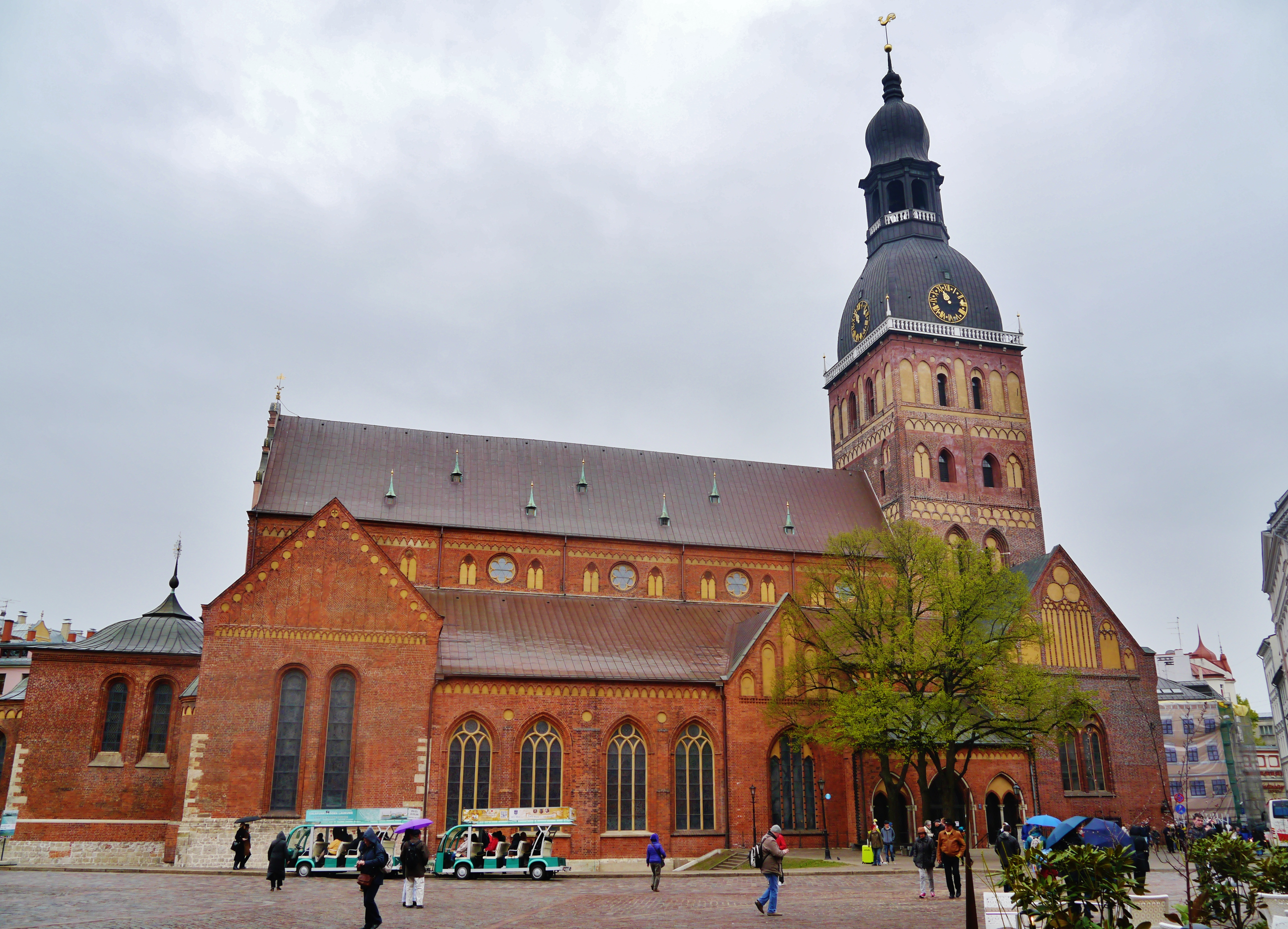
North wall

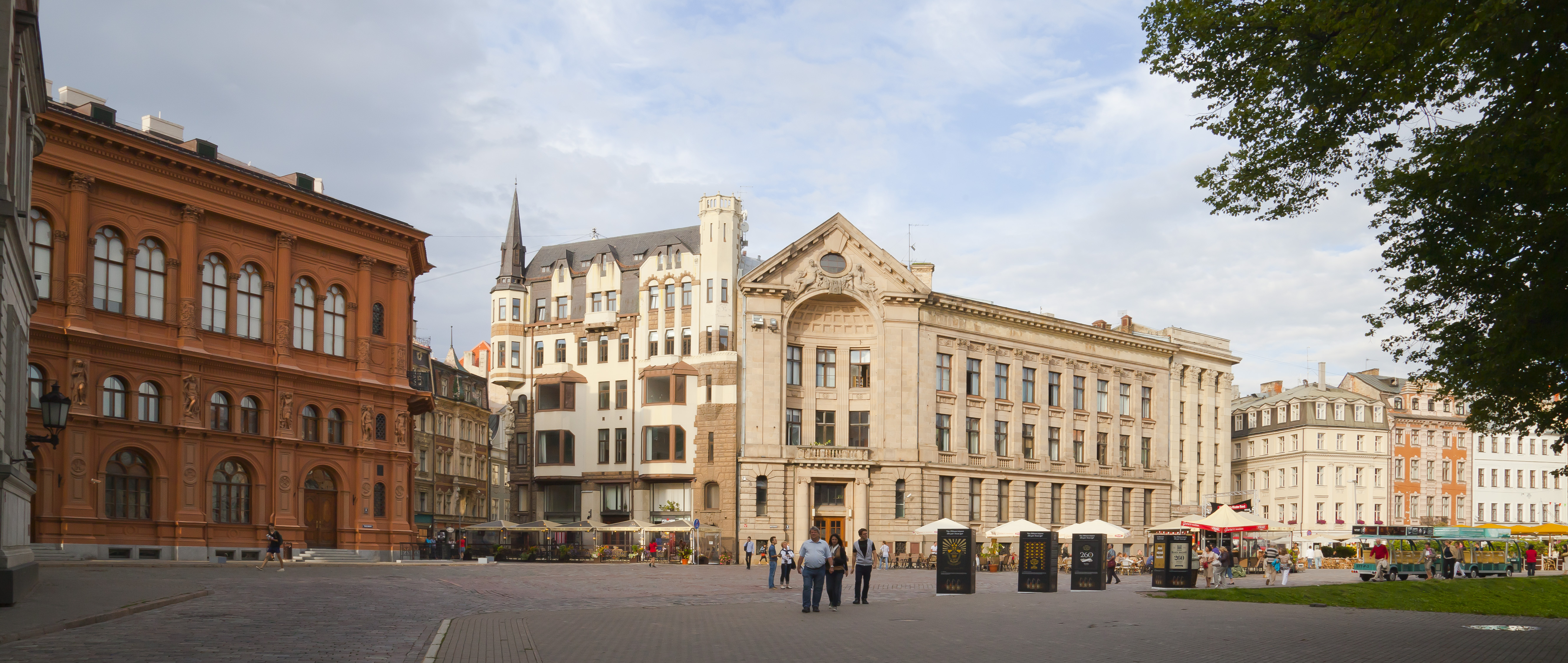
Cathedral Square (Doma laukums) off the north wall

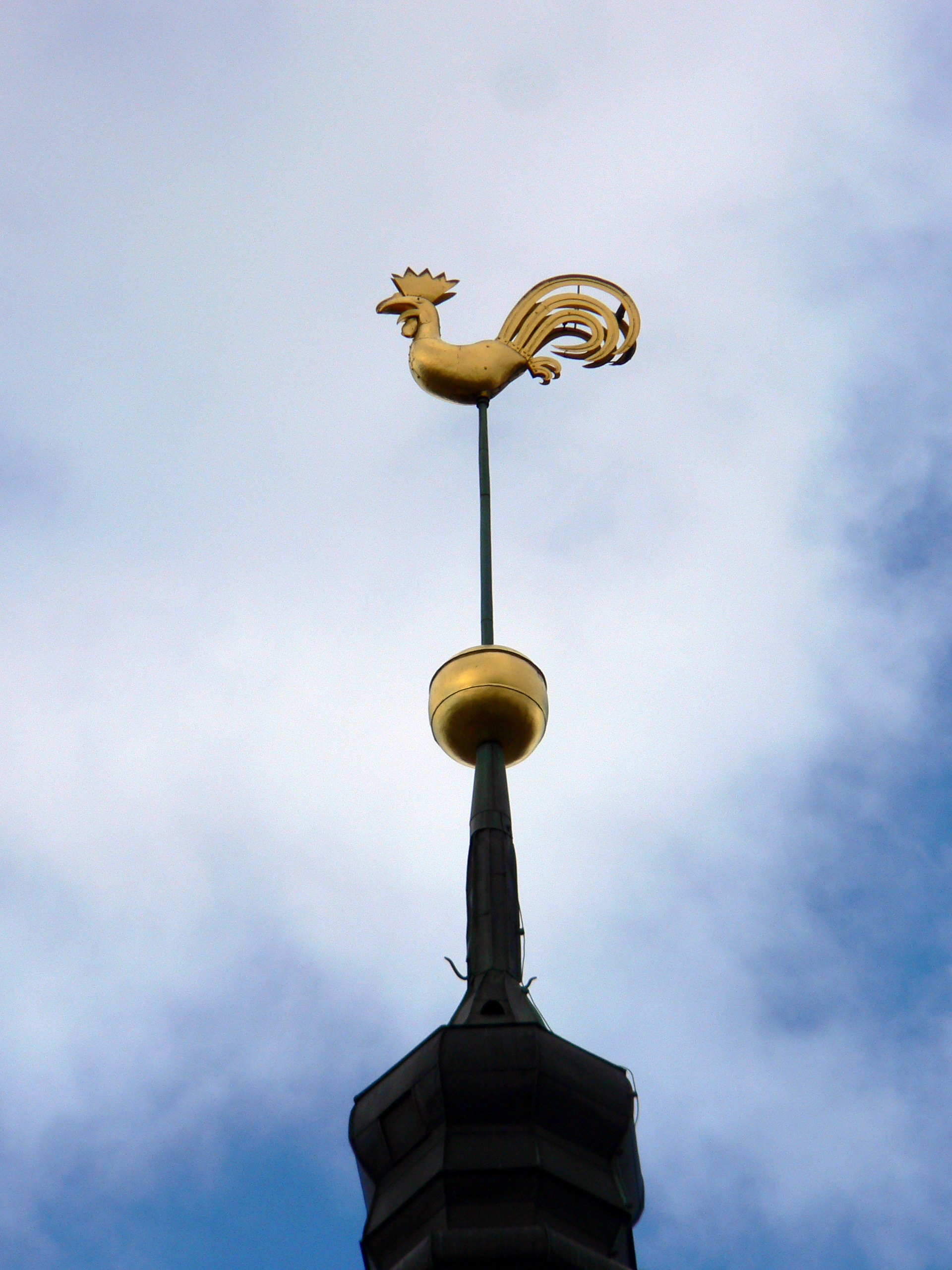
Weathercock

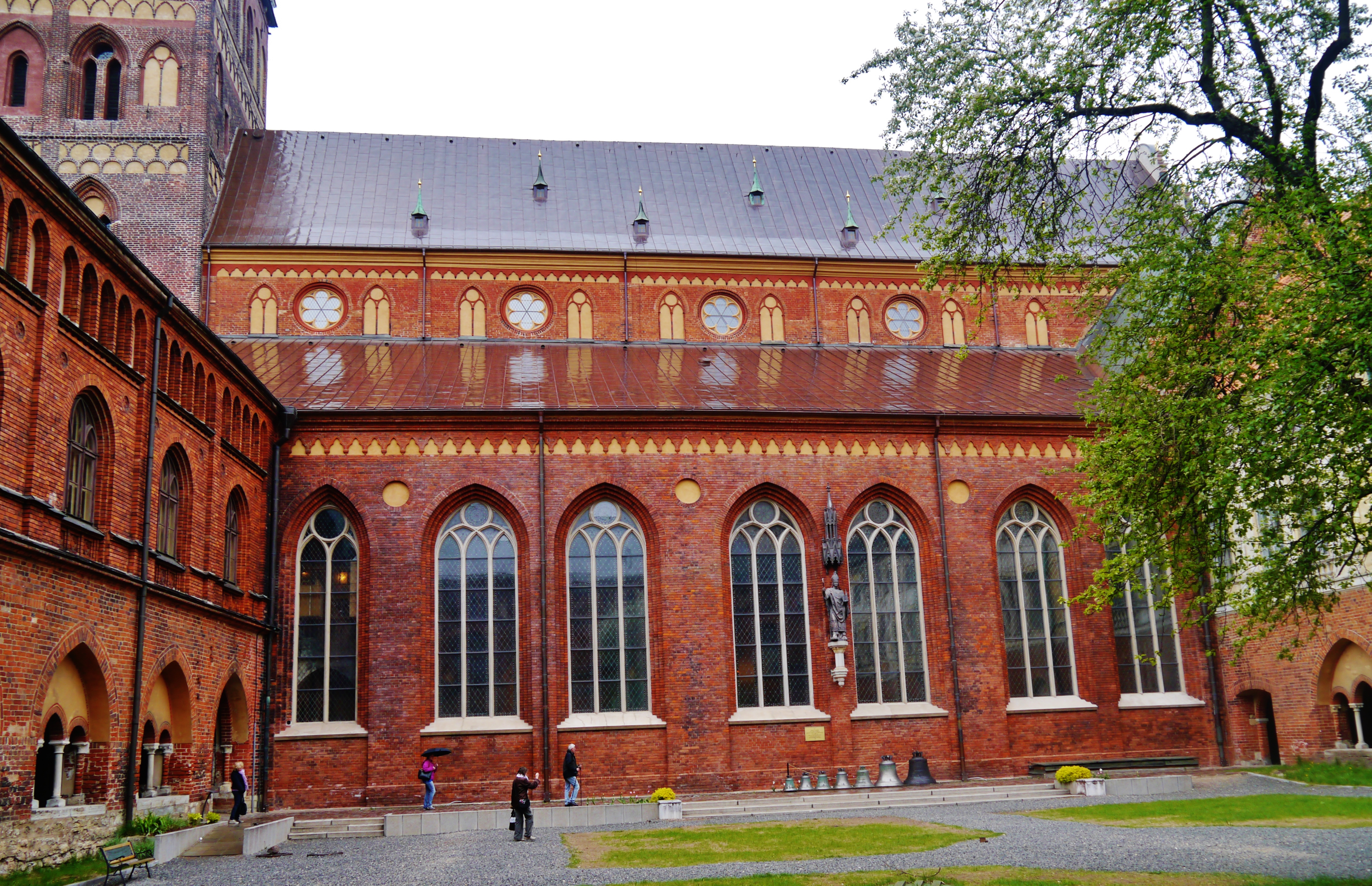
South wall and the statue of Bishop Albert

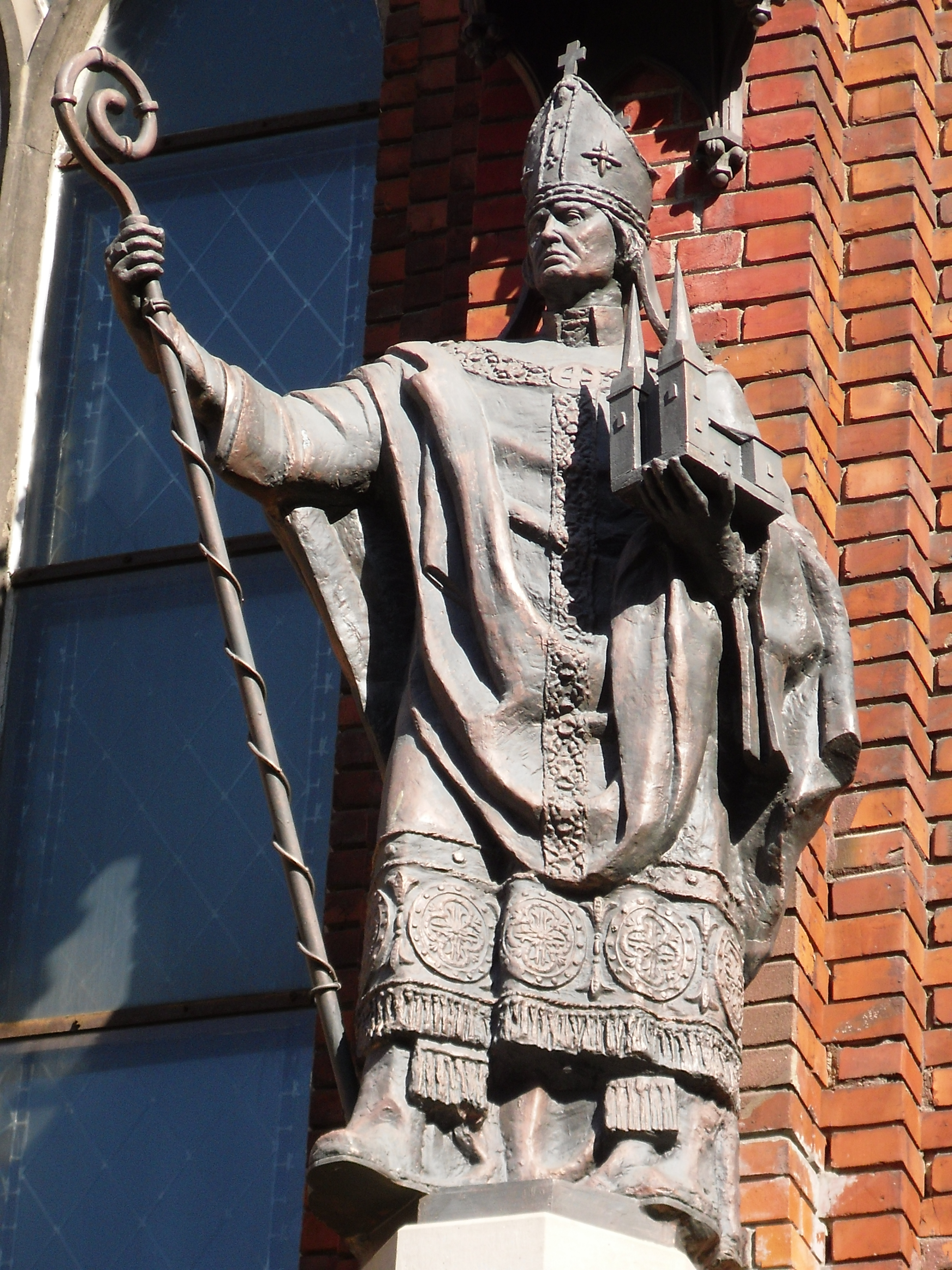
Albert of Riga, copy of an original statue by Karl Hans Bernewitz on the south wall of the cathedral cloister.

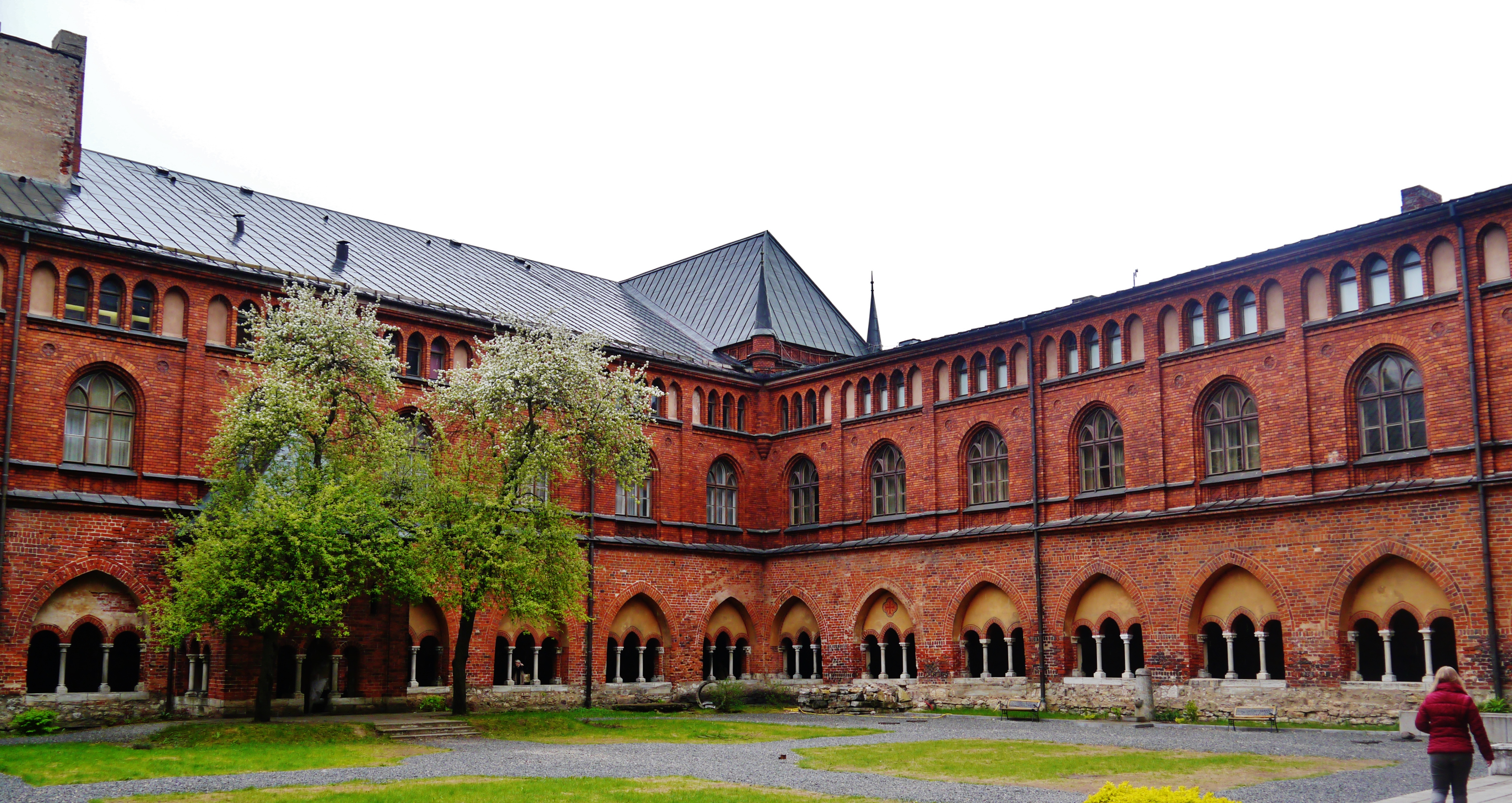
Cloister. Pinnacled roof is the Museum of the History of Riga and Navigation

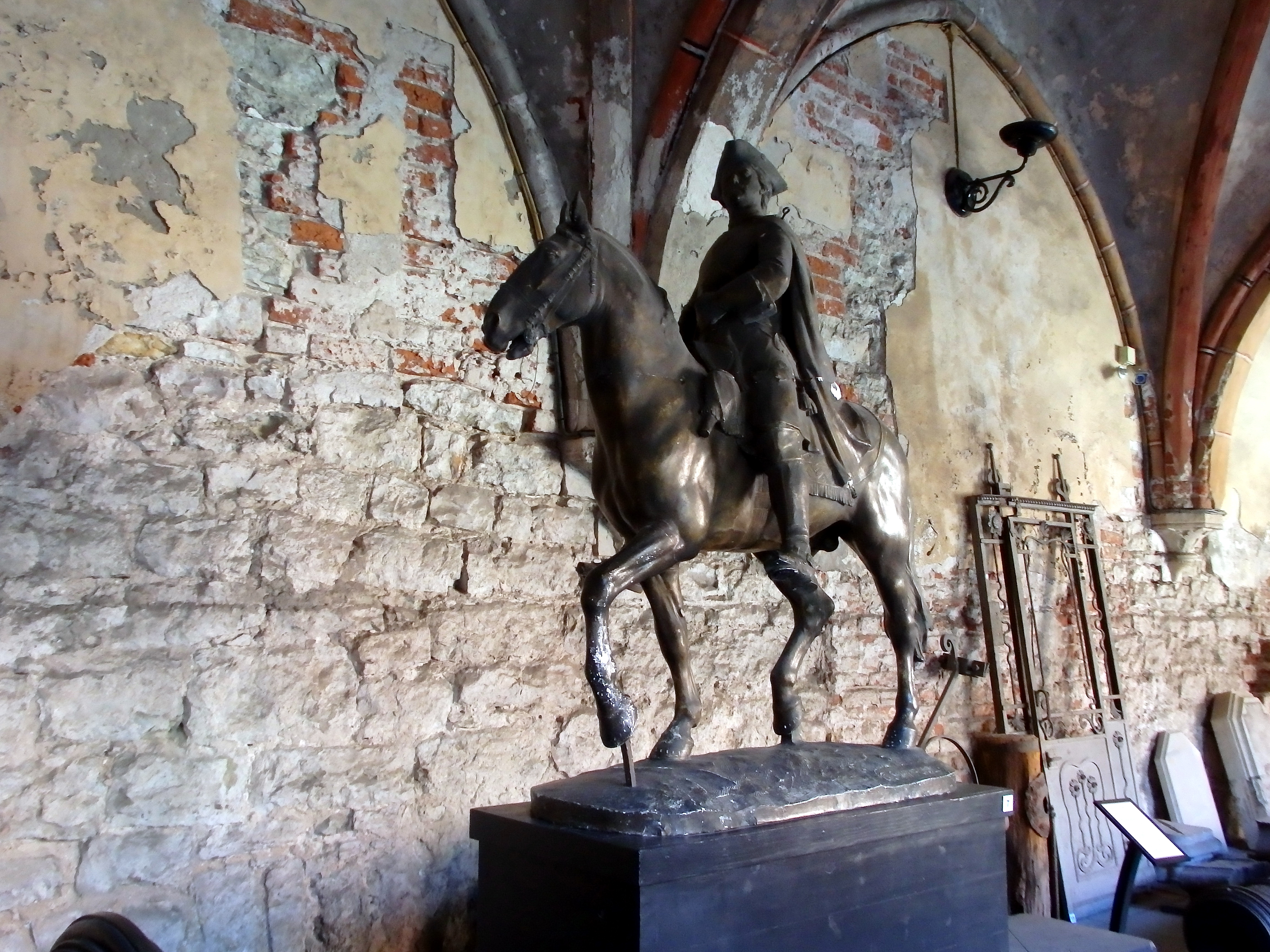
Copy of 1910–1914 equestrian statue of Peter I

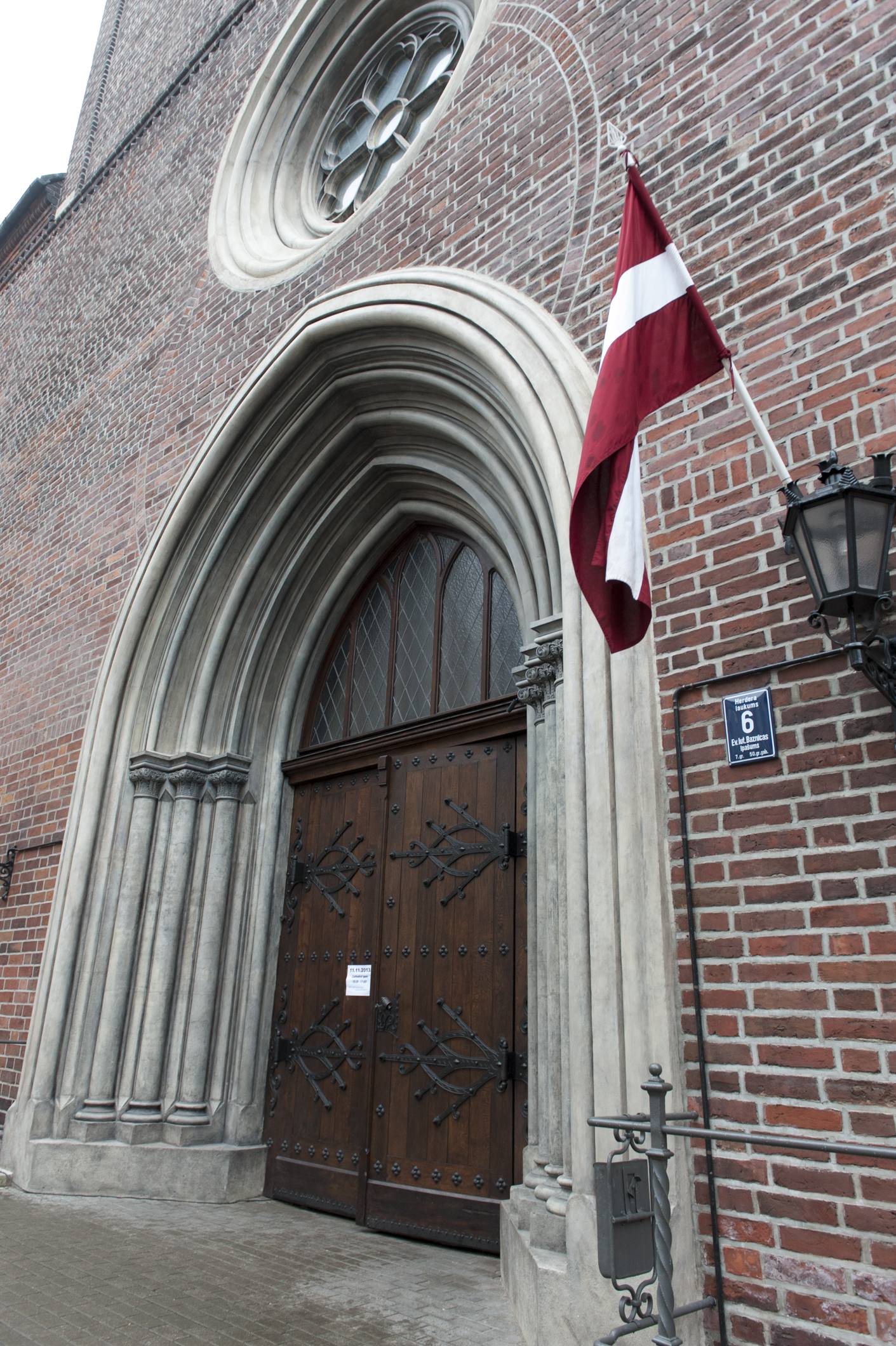
Cathedral doors on Herder Square

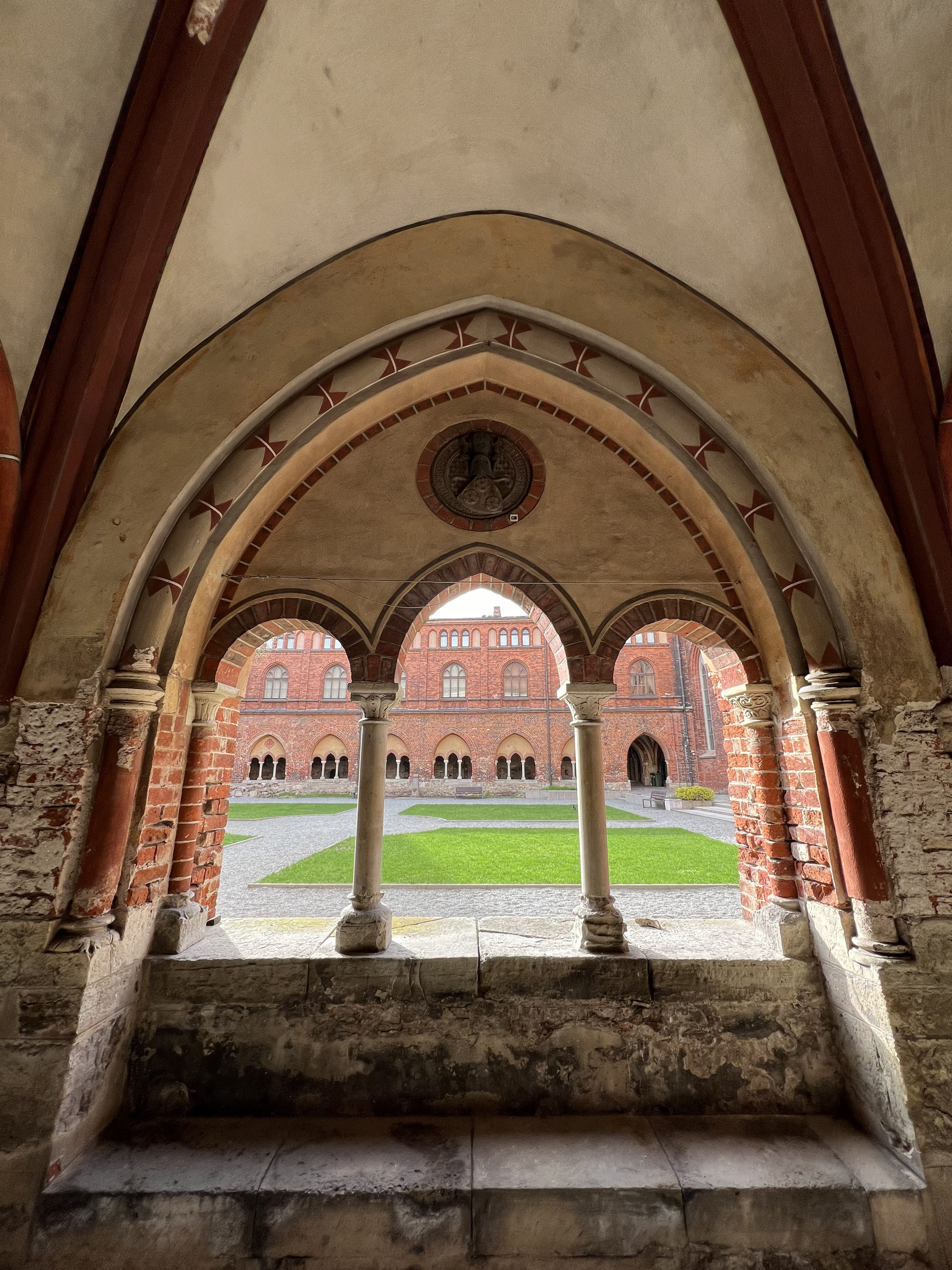
Coat of arms of von Rosen Family in the cloister of Riga Cathedral

== See also ==
- List of cathedrals in Latvia
