= Bastejkalns Park =

Park in Riga, Latvia

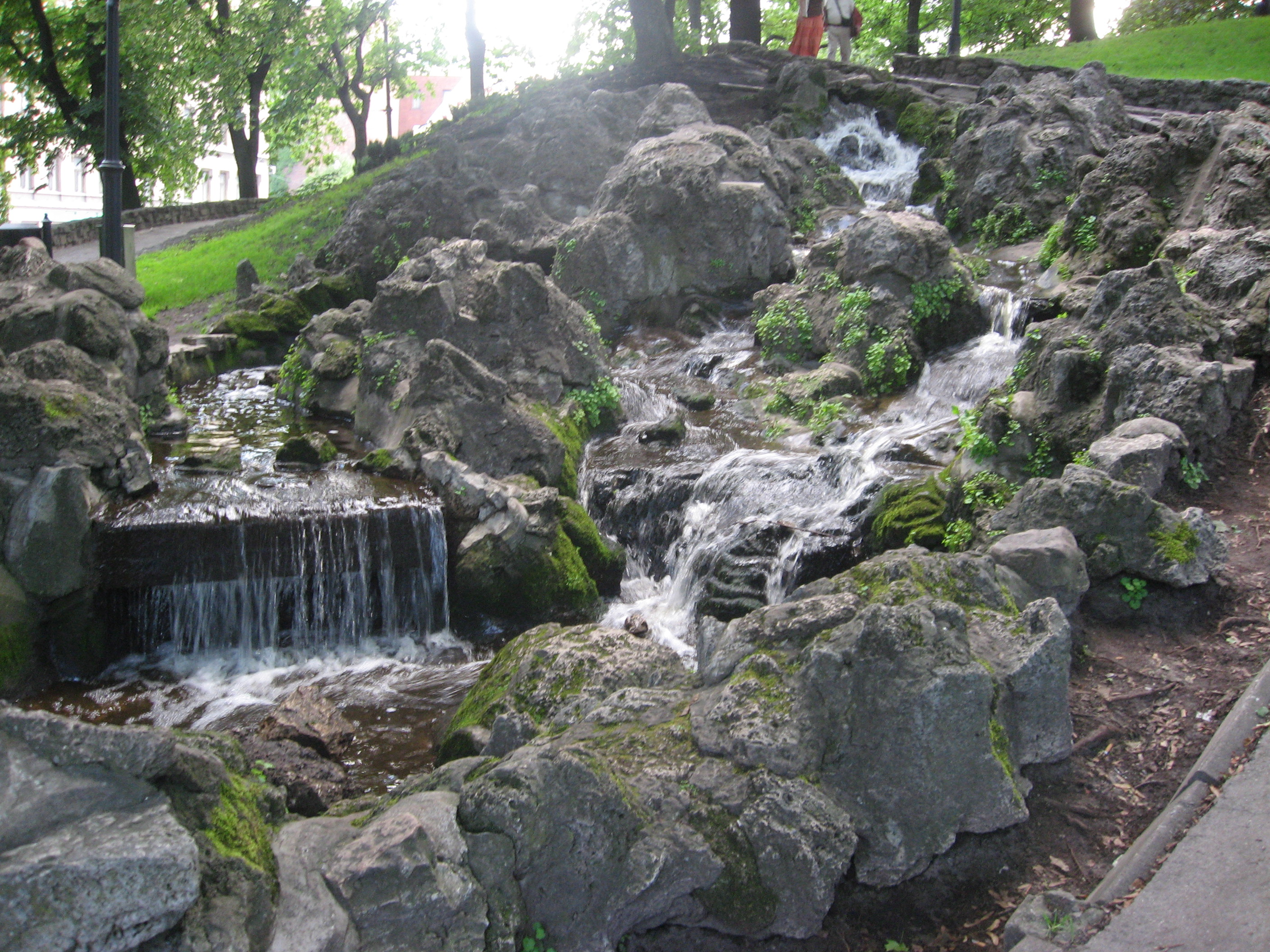
- Bastejkalns Park
- Interactive map of Bastejkalns Park
- Location: Riga, Latvia
- Coordinates: 56°57′6″N 24°06′40″E
- Created: 1898
- Status: All year

Bastejkalns Park (German: Basteiberg) is a spacious park on the northern edge of the old town of Latvian capital Riga.

== History ==
=== Bastion Hill ===
In 1856, the ramparts of the Riga Fortress were demolished, replacing the 'Sand Bastion' with the name of Basteiberg (German: Basteiberg) (originally known as Bastion Hill).

In 1879, the Riga Gardens Directorate was established and the 27-year-old Georg Kuphaldt was officially appointed Director of the Riga Gardens. His first project was the reconstruction of the greenery of Bastejkalns. The creation of the German: Basteiberganlagen plantation of the Bastion Hill lasted from 1859 to 1887. In 1860, a wooden pavilion was erected and replaced in 1887 with the first Bastion Hill café. The waterfall cascade built from Saulkalne's dolomite into the mountain was built in 1898. It has survived to the present day, but no longer with the less sophisticated underwater lighting that was still operational at the beginning of the last century. Around 1893, a pseudo-swan-style swan cottage, work of Riga's architect Heinrich Scheel, was placed on pontoons along the Bastejkalns Canal - usually pulled ashore in the winter months, where it is still today. Swans donated by "Riga Bird Breeding Society". In 1883, at the foot of the Bastion Hill, a 23-meter-long wooden bridge was erected over the canal (its curvature was so steep that people slipped out of it in winter and the bridge was ironically called by the Riga inhabitants), which was replaced in 1893 by masonry. Then a bridge was built to connect the Old Town with what is now Rainis Boulevard (designed in 1898, rebuilt a little later and still in operation).

In 1951, according to the architect Jānis Ginters project, Bastejkalns built support walls, which used parts of the buildings of Riga destroyed by World War II. The Bastion Hill greenery was restored with various sculptures in 1968. The square of this public park was used until 1856 as part of the eastern fortifications and consisted in this area of earthen ramparts, covered trenches, bastions and moats. This fortress section was assigned to the commander of the 'Powder Tower'.

In the following years, the open ground was reshaped by considerable landfills and the city canal and connected to the eastern suburb by new bridges. At the suggestion of the architects Johann Felsko and Otto Dietze, a green area of parks and gardens as well as a broad boulevard were created here. For a large part of the facilities, the landscape architect Georg Kuphaldt was acquired as a planner. A landmark and enrichment of the plant are the 1898 designed as Wasserkunst waterfall. To those the city canal in the area of the park spanning bridges belongs the 1900 built Timmbrücke.

The park has been expanded to include more monuments and facilities, including the Freedom Monument and the two memorial stones for the victims of Riga citizens and security forces who died in January 1991 in an OMON deployment. As early as 1929, the construction of the Blaumanis Monument was completed. As part of a reorganization from 1968, the sculpture Peace Dance was erected in 1970. In 2006, Elizabeth II and Vaira Vīķe-Freiberga unveiled monument to Riga Mayor George Armitstead. In 2007, the unveiling of the Vīgners Monument took place.

== Flora ==
In total, 110 (as of 1988) of exotic trees and shrubs and 19 native species, such as Malus × atrosanguinea, (Malus × purpurea), kobus magnolia (Magnolia kobus), Kentucky coffeetree ( Gymnocladus dioicus ), Silver linden ( Tilia tomentosa ), Canadian poplar (Populus × canadensis "Aurea" ), Tatar maple ( Acer tataricum ), horse chestnut (Aesculus × neglecta), Yellow buckeye ( Aesculus flava ), Large-leaved lime ( Tilia platyphyllos "Obliqua" ), white walnut ( Juglans cinerea ), European cornel ( Cornus mas ), Alpine Laburnum ( Laburnum alpinum ), Maidenhair tree ( Ginkgo biloba ), Manchurian walnut ( Juglans mandshurica ), field maple ( Acer campestre ), Crimean lime (Tilia × euchlora ), European ash ( Fraxinus excelsior "Pendula" ), Red ash (Fraxinus pennsylvanica var. subintegerrima), Hawthorn ( Crataegus punctata ), English Hawthorn (Crataegus laevigata), Laurel-leaved poplar (Populus laurifolia), common hornbeam (Carpinus betulus), black alder ( Alnus glutinosa ), common yew ( Taxus baccata ), etc.

There are also some rarities here, such as Ginkgo biloba. North American ragweed was planted by Georg Kuphaldt in the 1900s. In spring, across the channel from Latvian National Opera, white magnolias (Magnolia denudata) are shining in the University of Latvia botanical garden, since it been planted in the 20th century. Since the 1970s, there is also a Forsythia × intermedia or Forsythia mandschurica from China with bright yellow flowers.

== Gallery ==
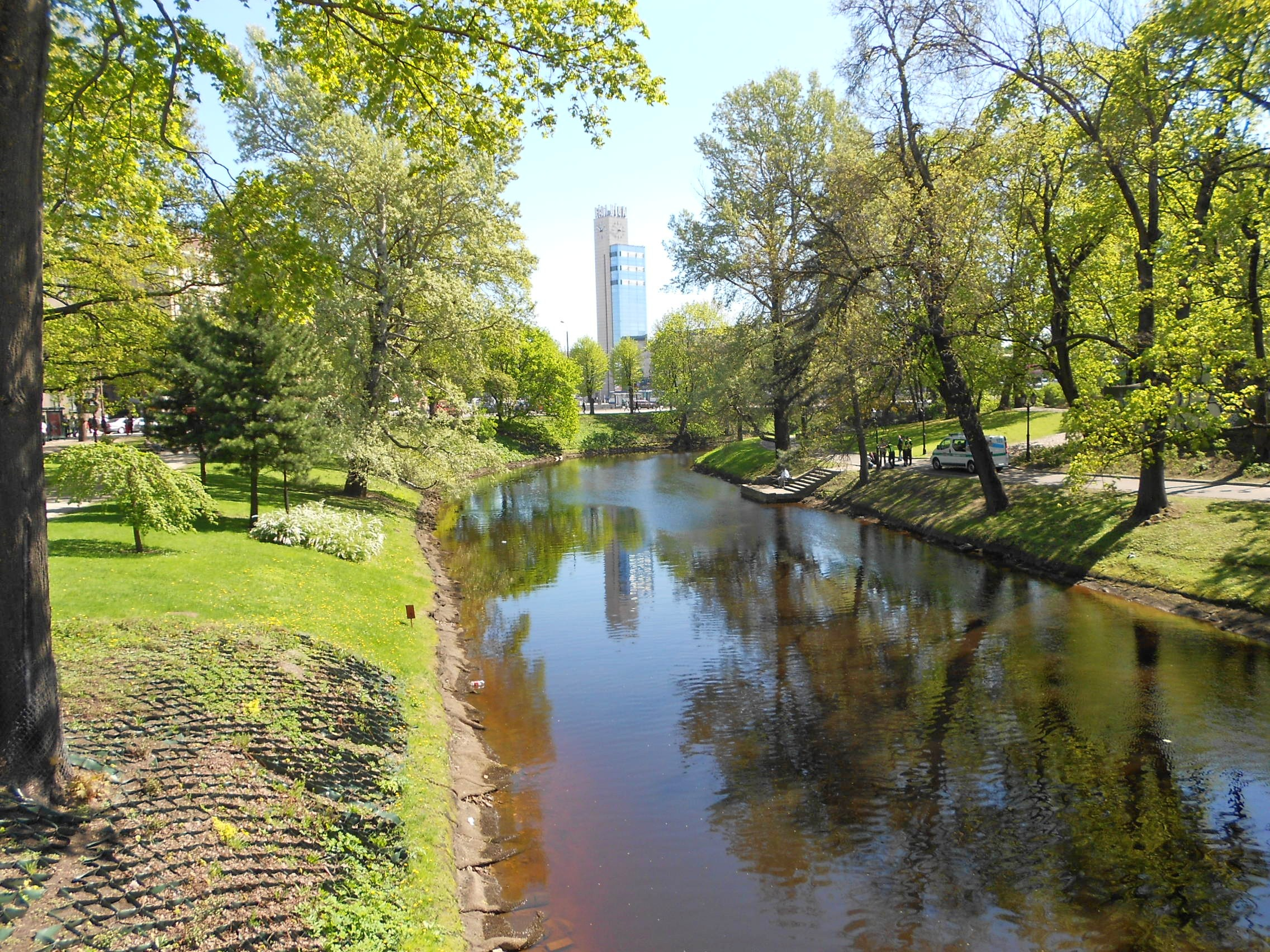

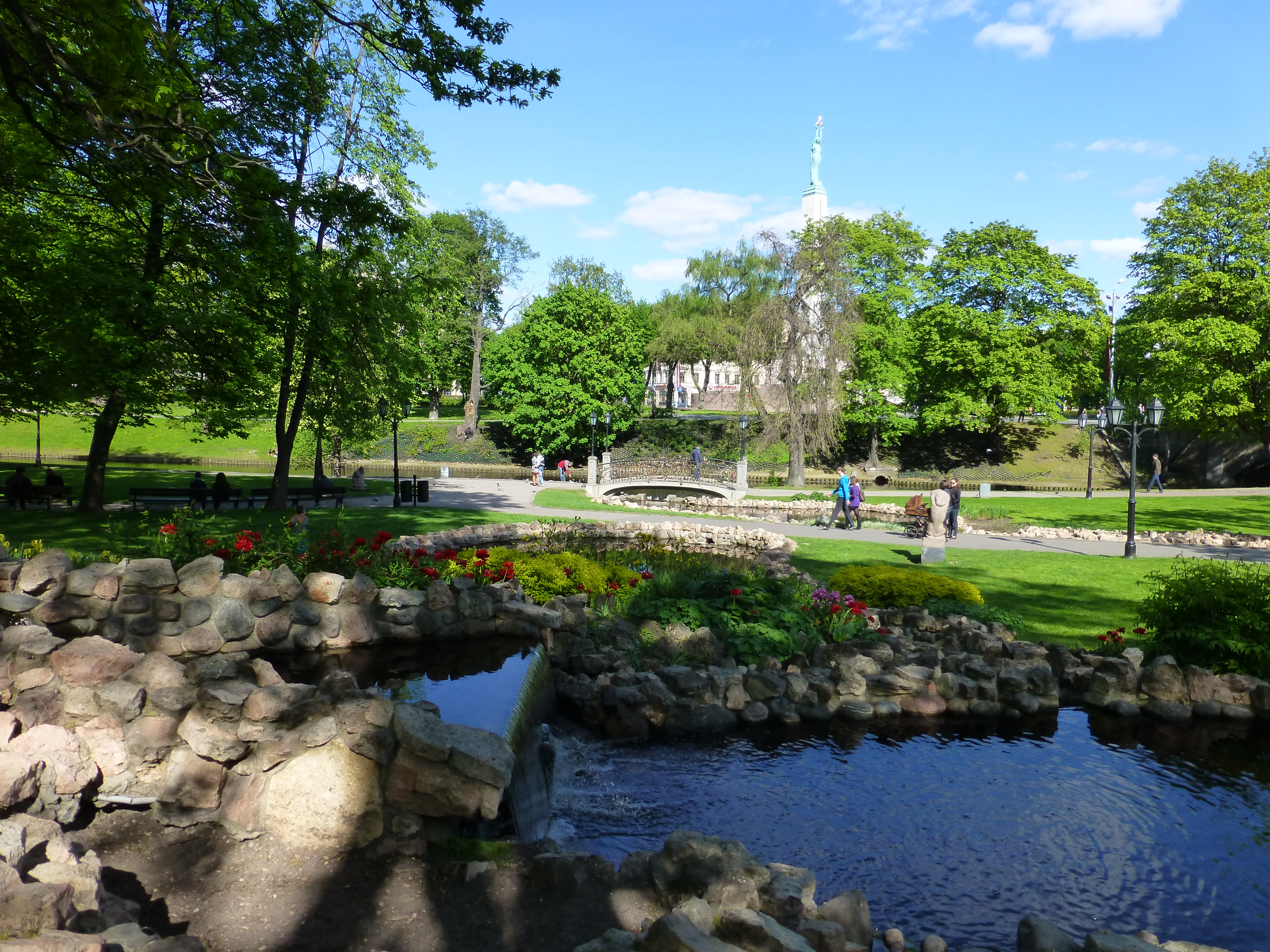

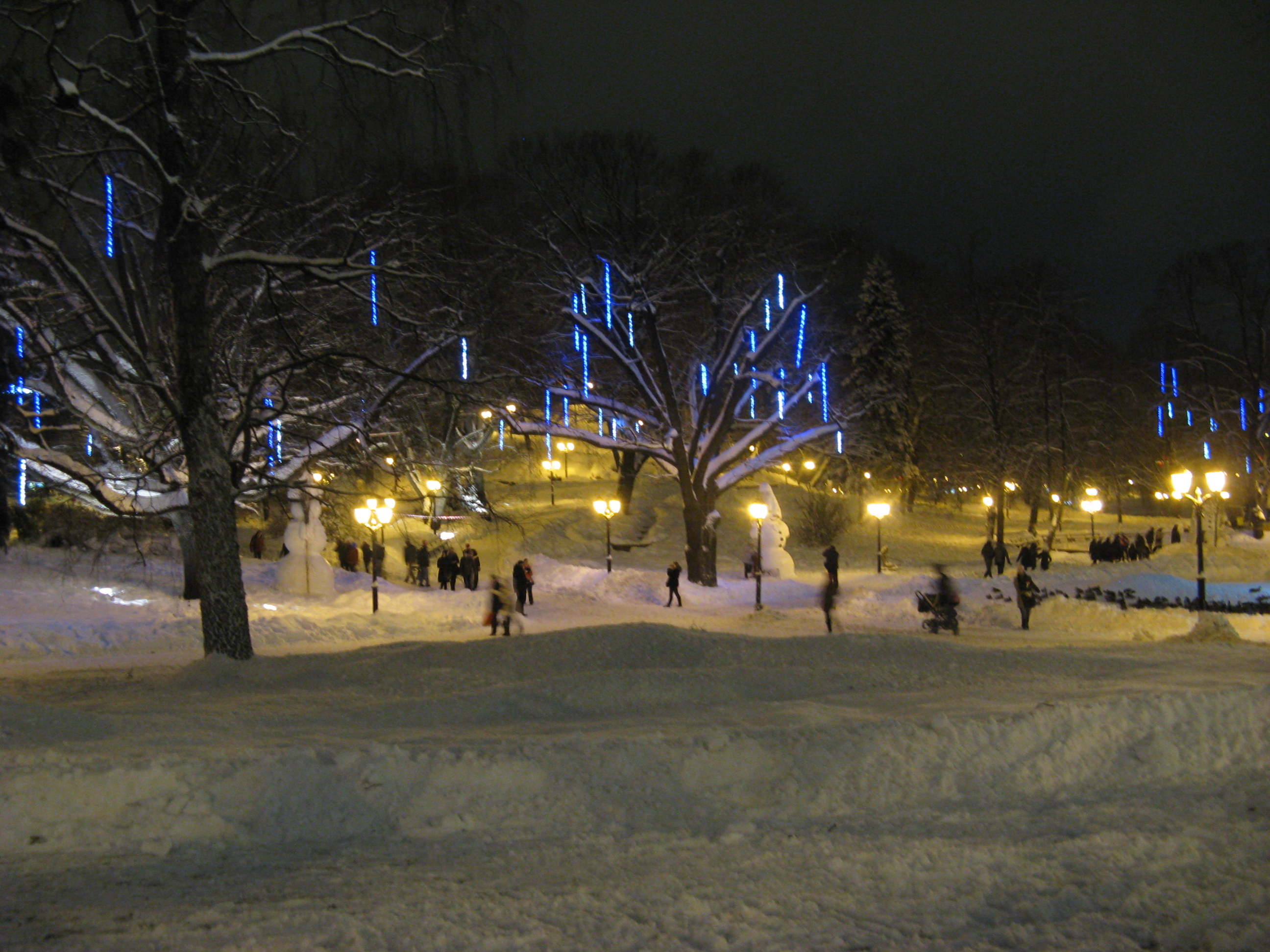

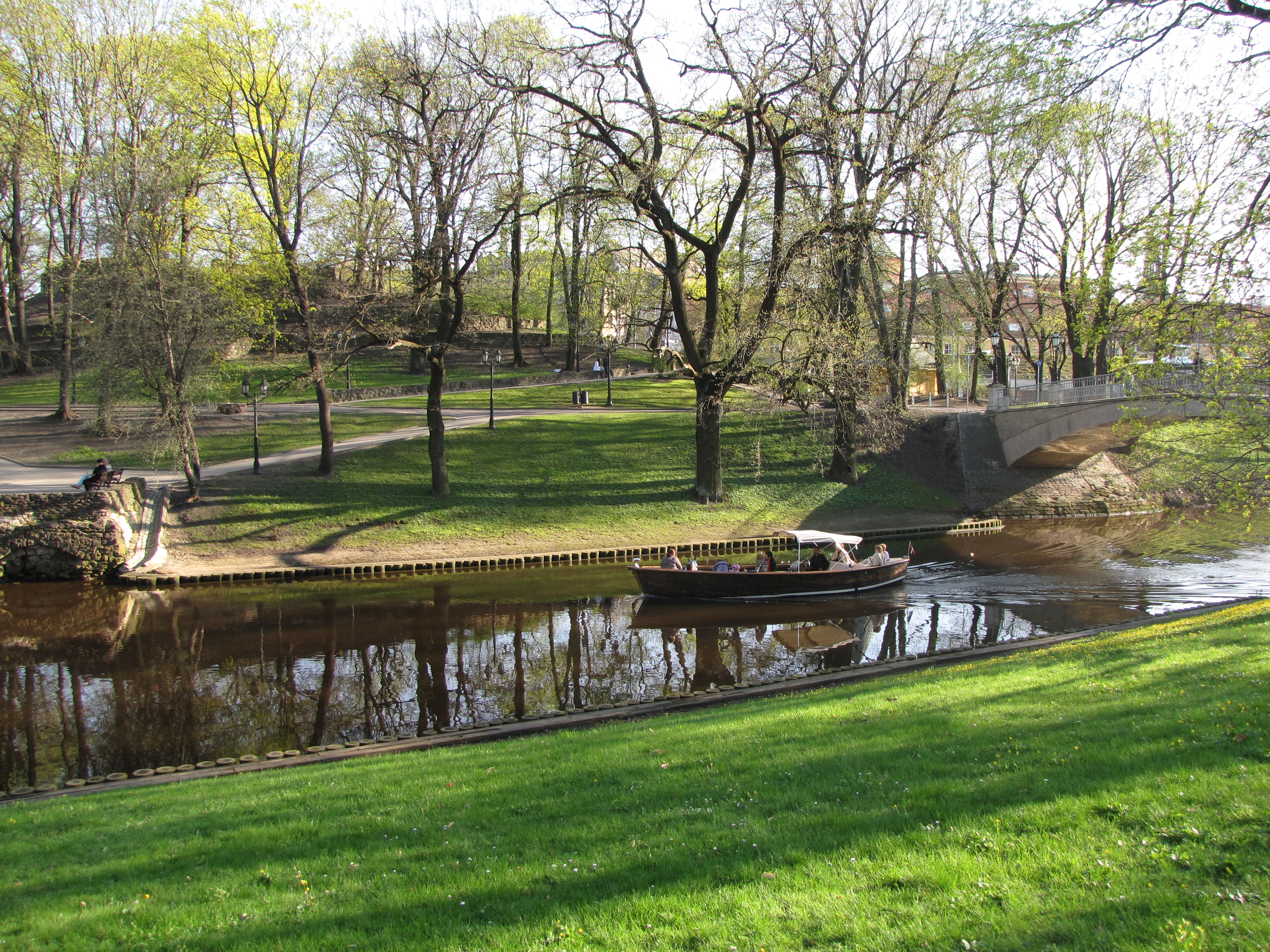

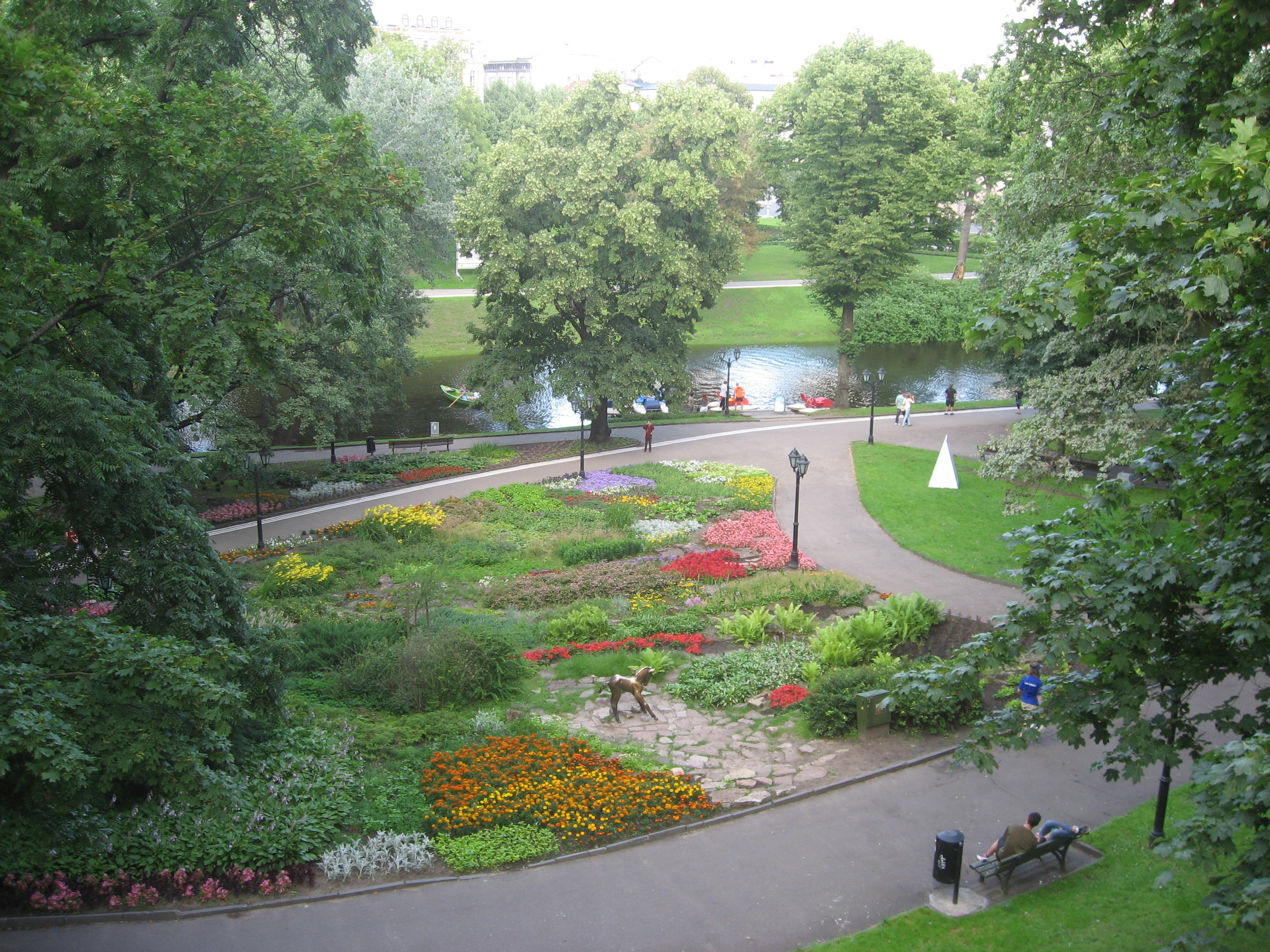
