= Felsko =

Felsko may refer to:

- Johann Felsko, (1813—1902), an architect, urban planner and the chief architect of Riga for 35 years
- Karl Felsko, (1844—1918), one of the most productive architects during the building boom in Riga of the late 19th century and early 20th century
