= Small Guild, Riga =

Historic building and former craftsmen guild in Riga, Latvia

Coordinates: 56.9494916°N 24.1080916°E

Small Guild Mazā ģilde
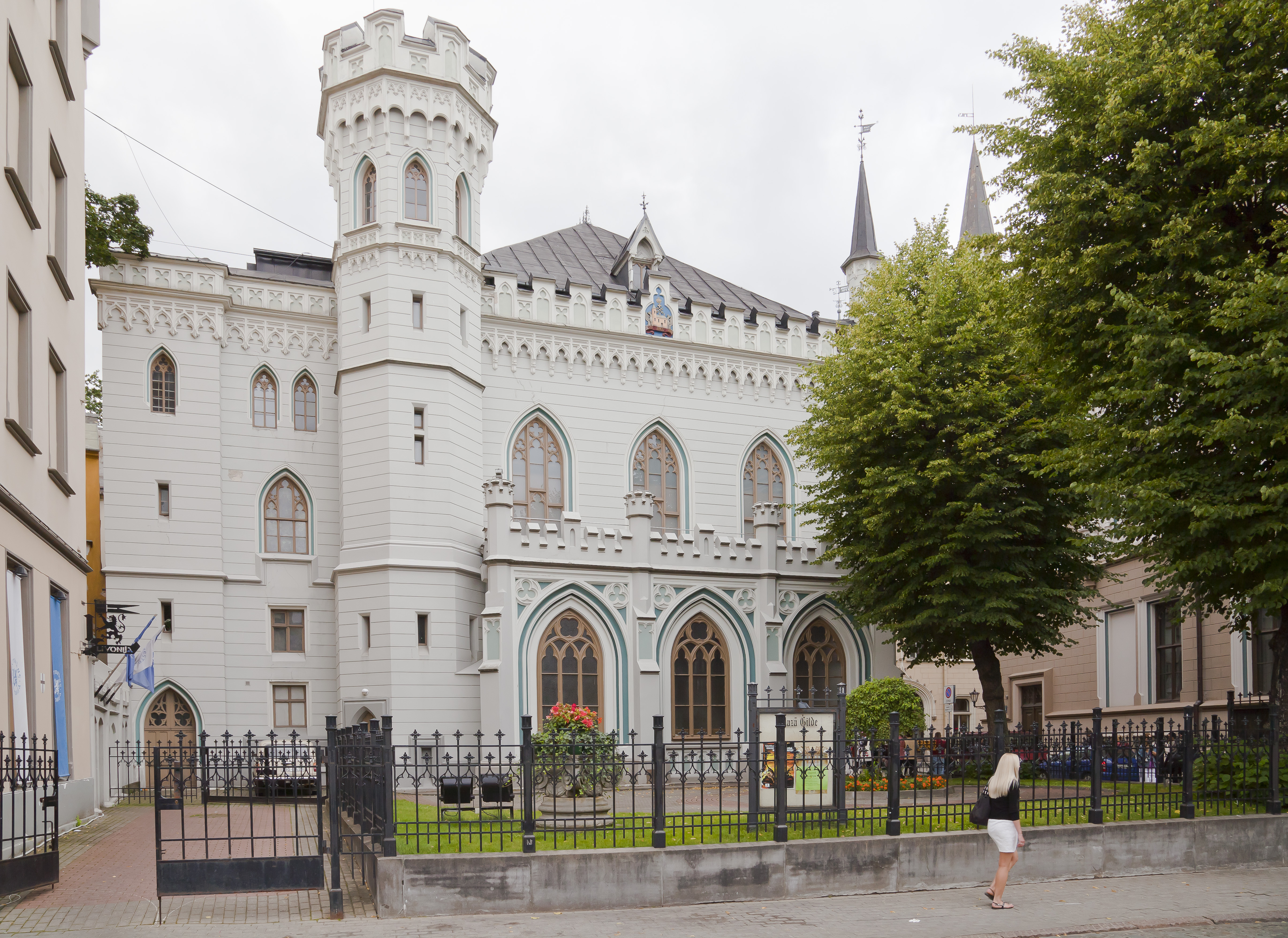
- Interactive map of the Small Guild; Mazā ģilde area

General information
- Architectural style: Neo-Gothic
- Location: Riga, Latvia
- Construction started: 1864
- Completed: 1866

Design and construction
- Architect: Johann Felsko

The Small Guild (Latvian: Mazā ģilde) is a building located in Riga, Latvia, at 3/5 Amatu iela in Old Riga. It was built in 1864—66 after a project by architect Johann Felsko in Neo-Gothic style, replacing an older building located in the same spot until 1863. The building was the meeting hall of the Riga Small Guild (Riga Craftsmen Guild), a fraternal organization of certified craftsmen in Riga which was active from 1352 to 1936.

The organization had split off of the predecessing Holy Spirit Guild of Riga and existed alongside the Riga Merchant (Large) Guild, which was founded in 1354 and met in the nearby Large Guild building.

The building itself consists of two wings: the main section, unveiled in 1866 and the wing. It was originally built in 1855 as a separate building, hosting a shelter for the poor. In 1901 the shelter was converted in to a craftsmen school and merged into a single complex.

After the fraternal Small Guild was dissolved, it was succeeded by the Latvian Chamber of Craftsmen in 1936, which also took over the Small Guild building. The Small Guild building has served as a cultural event venue since 1944, when the Latvian Trade Union Cultural Center was established in its premises.
