= St. Martin's Church, Riga =

St. Martin's Church
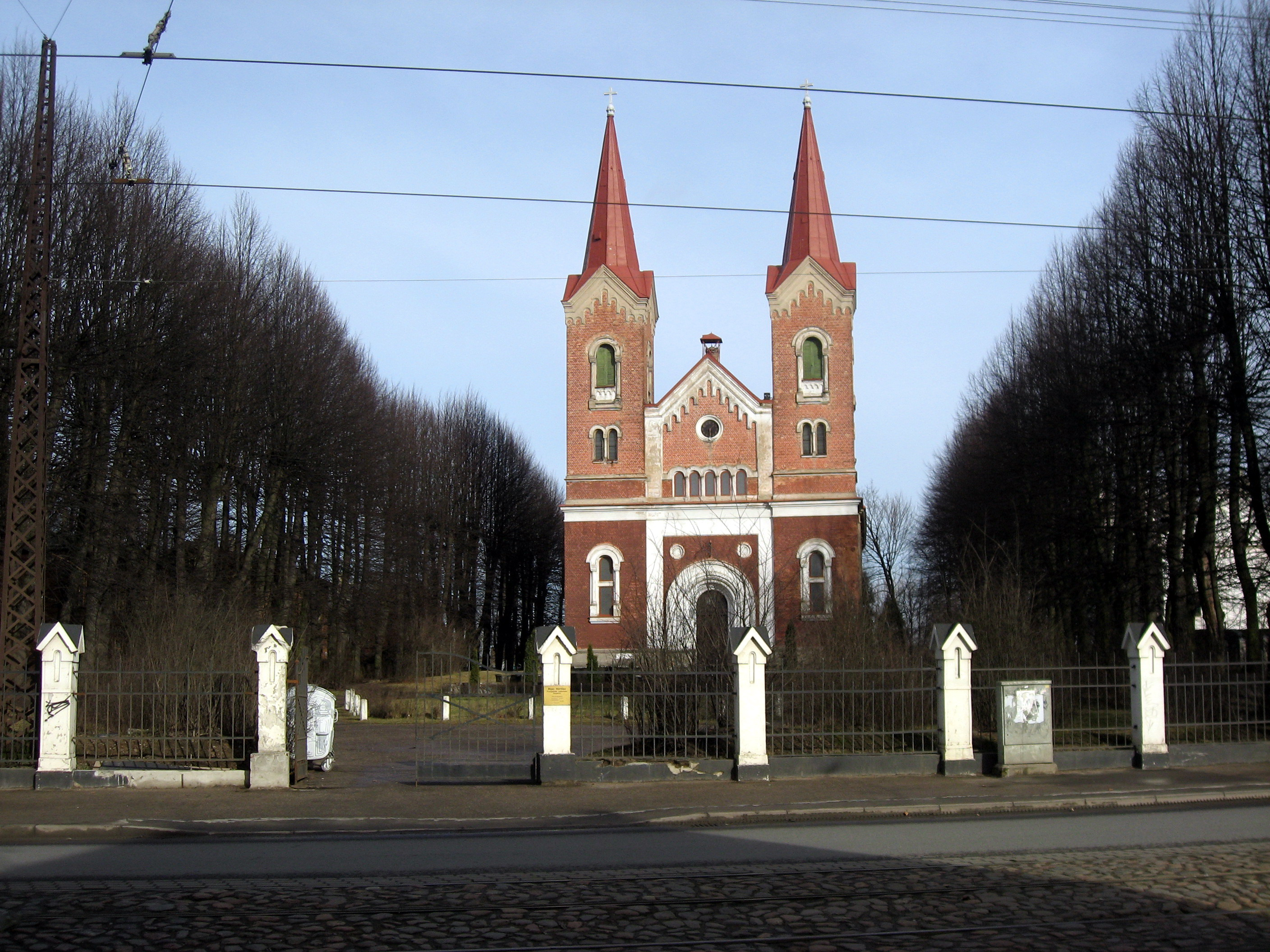

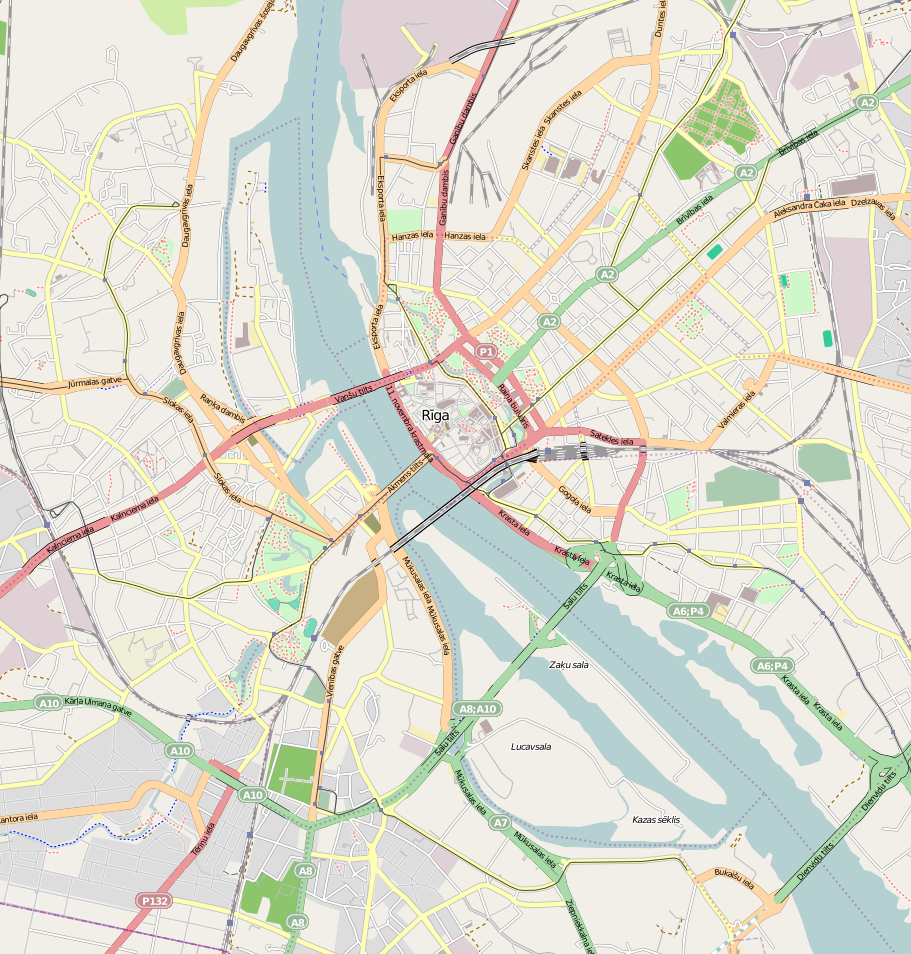
- Location within Riga
- 56°57′0.85″N 24°4′18.46″E
- Location: Riga
- Country: Latvia
- Denomination: Lutheran

St. Martin's Church (Latvian: Rīgas Mārtiņa luterāņu baznīca) is a Lutheran church in Riga, the capital of Latvia. It is a parish church of the Evangelical Lutheran Church of Latvia. The church is situated at the address 34 Slokas Street. Church is consecrated in 1852 and designed in Neo-Gothic forms by Johann Felsko.
