= Riga Merchant Guild =

German merchant guild in Riga, Latvia (1354-1936)

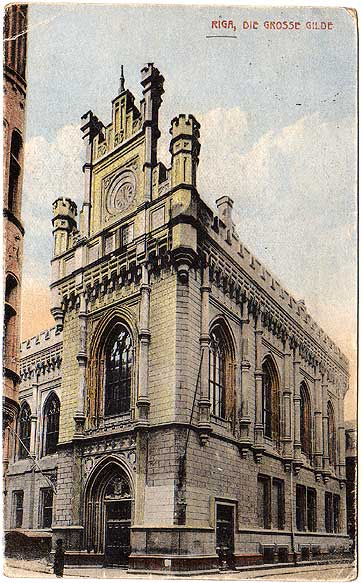
Large Guild, Riga, 1918

The Riga Merchant Guild, also known as the Large Guild of Riga or St. Mary's Guild (German: Die Große Gilde zu Riga, St. Marien-Gilde) was a German merchant guild in Riga, the Latvian capital, which existed from 1354 to 1936. Their meeting place was the historic Large Guild building in Riga, preserved to this day.

== Establishment ==
A precursor, the Heilig-Kreuz-Gilde (Guild of the Holy Cross) was founded around 1252. Riga became a member of the Hanseatic League in 1282, and the German guilds became more prominent in the life of the city. In 1354, the merchants created their own separate guild, independent of the Heilig-Kreuz-Gilde, and called it St. Marien-Gilde. The counterpart of the Merchant Guild was the Small Guild of Riga, also known as The Guild of St. John (Die Kleine Gilde zu Riga, Sankt-Johannis-Gilde), a fraternity of master craftsmen which had separated from the other guilds in 1352.
