= Heinrich Scheel =

Baltic-German architect (1829–1909)

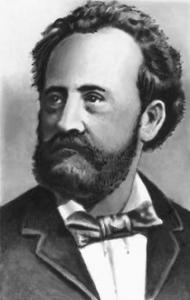
- Born: Heinrich Karl Scheel; 17 May 1829; Hamburg, German Confederation
- Died: 13 April 1909 (aged 79); Riga, Governorate of Livonia, Russian Empire
- Known for: Architecture
- Movement: Eclecticism, Art Nouveau

Heinrich Karl Scheel (Latvian: Heinrihs Kārlis Šēls; 17 May 1829 – 13 April 1909) was a Baltic German architect who lived and worked in Riga. He is considered one of the greatest 19th-century Riga architects and designed more than 40 public and private buildings there.

== Biography ==
Heinrich Scheel was born 17 May 1829 in Hamburg. In 1847, he started studies at the St. Petersburg Academy of Arts. After graduation in 1851 he became assistant of the architect and academy professor Ludwig Bohnstedt. In 1853, Scheel supervised the construction of the Riga Great Guild building (architect Karl Beine). From 1860 to 1862 he, together with Friedrich Hess, supervised the construction of the First Riga German Theater (architect Ludwig Bohnstedt). In 1862 Scheel became lecturer at the St. Peterburg Academy of Arts although his main workplace was Riga.

In the second half of the 19th century, Heinrich Scheel designed buildings in Riga, Ventspils and also Estonia. He also restored many rooms at the Jelgava Palace. In 1899 he, together with Friedrich Scheefel, created their own building office Scheel&Scheefel which became one of the pioneers of Art Nouveau architecture in Riga.

Heinrich Scheel died on 13 April 1909 in Riga and is buried at the Riga Great Cemetery.

== Architecture ==
Heinrich Scheel mostly worked in Eclectic styles. Most buildings are designed in Neo-Renaissance forms, but he also used Neo-Gothic or mixture of them both. In the beginning of the 20th century he was one of the first architects who started to work in Art Nouveau style.

== Gallery ==
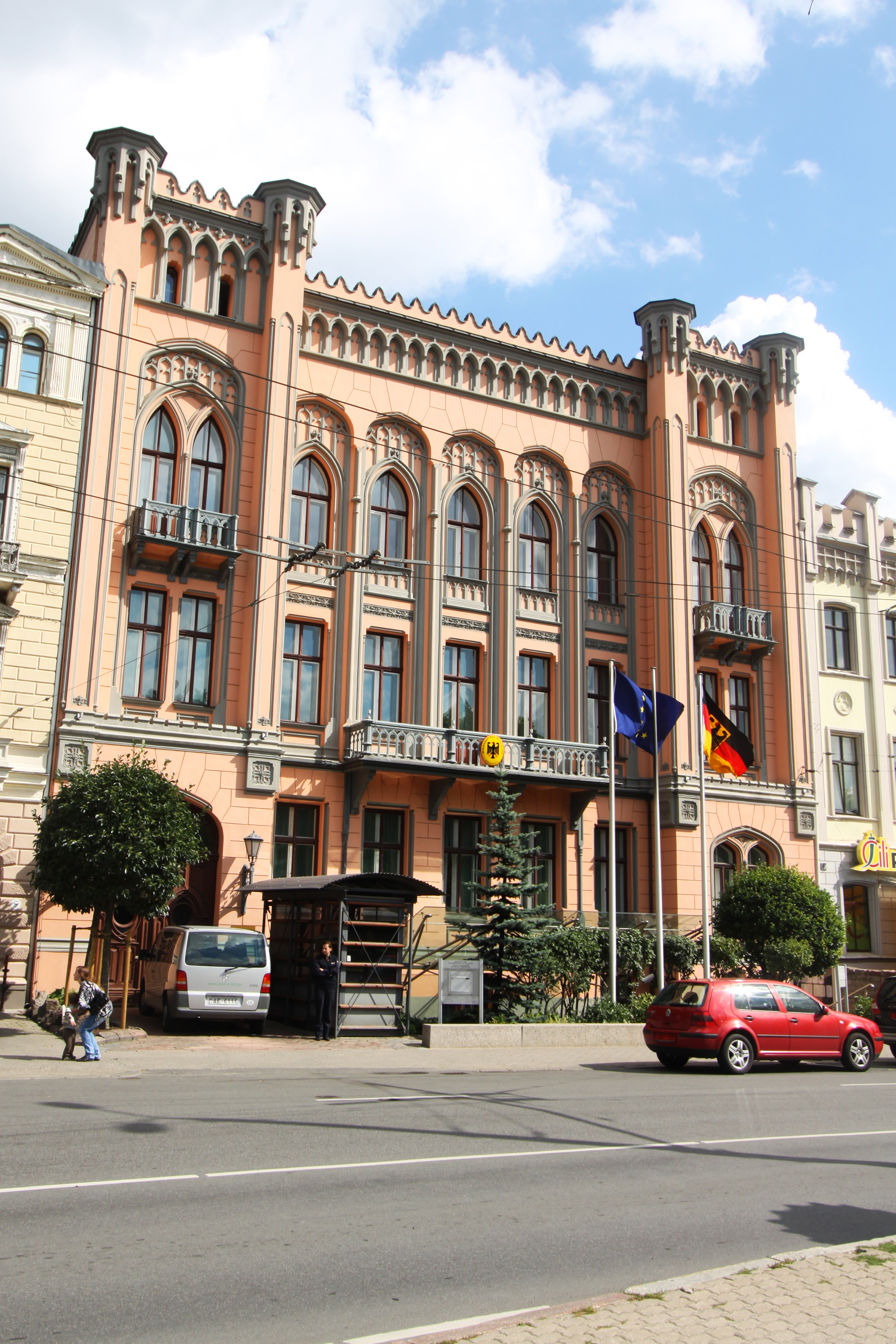
Building on Raiņa Blvd. in Riga. Today Embassy of Germany.

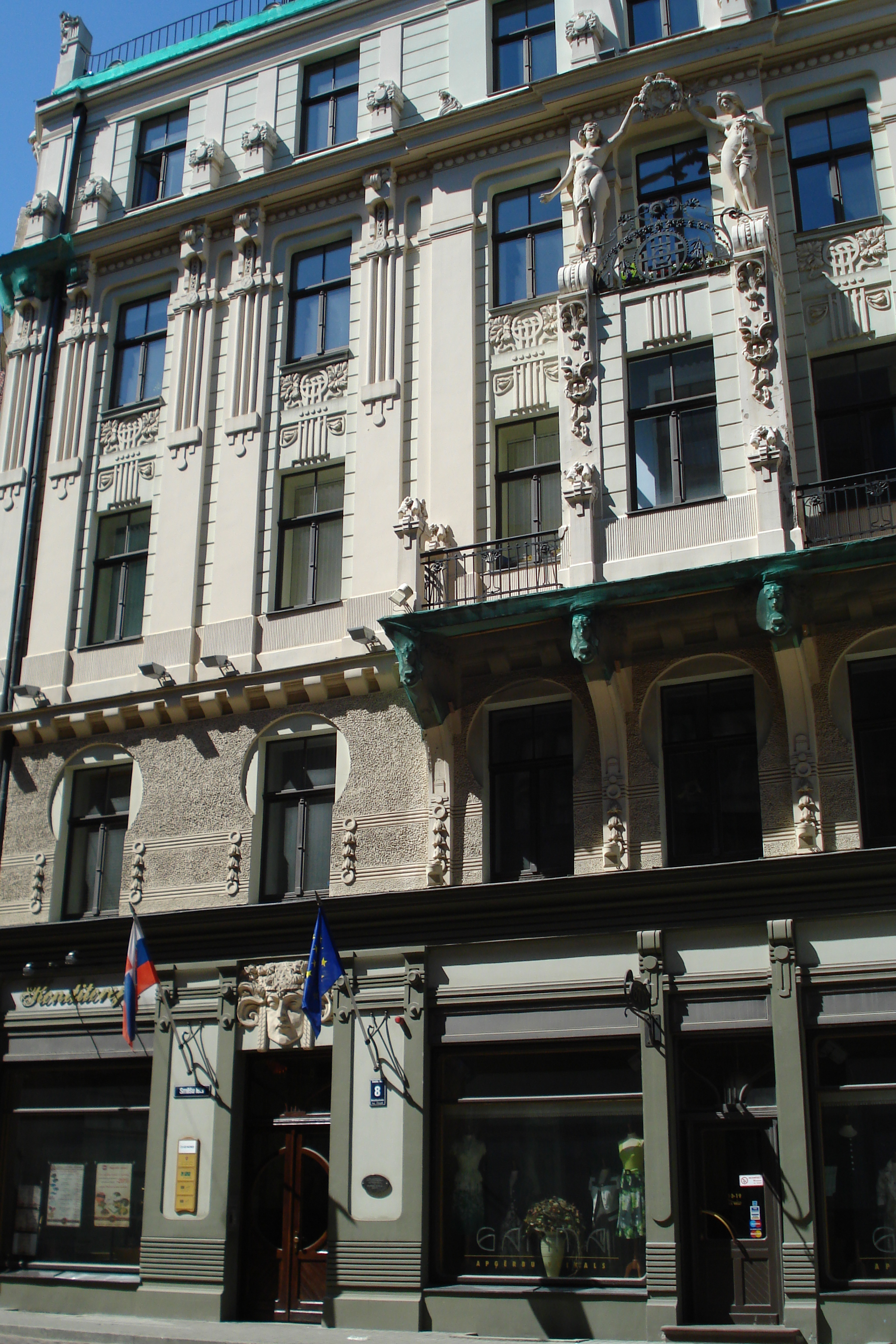
The building Smilšu Street 8a in Old Riga, built in 1902. Today Embassy of Slovakia.

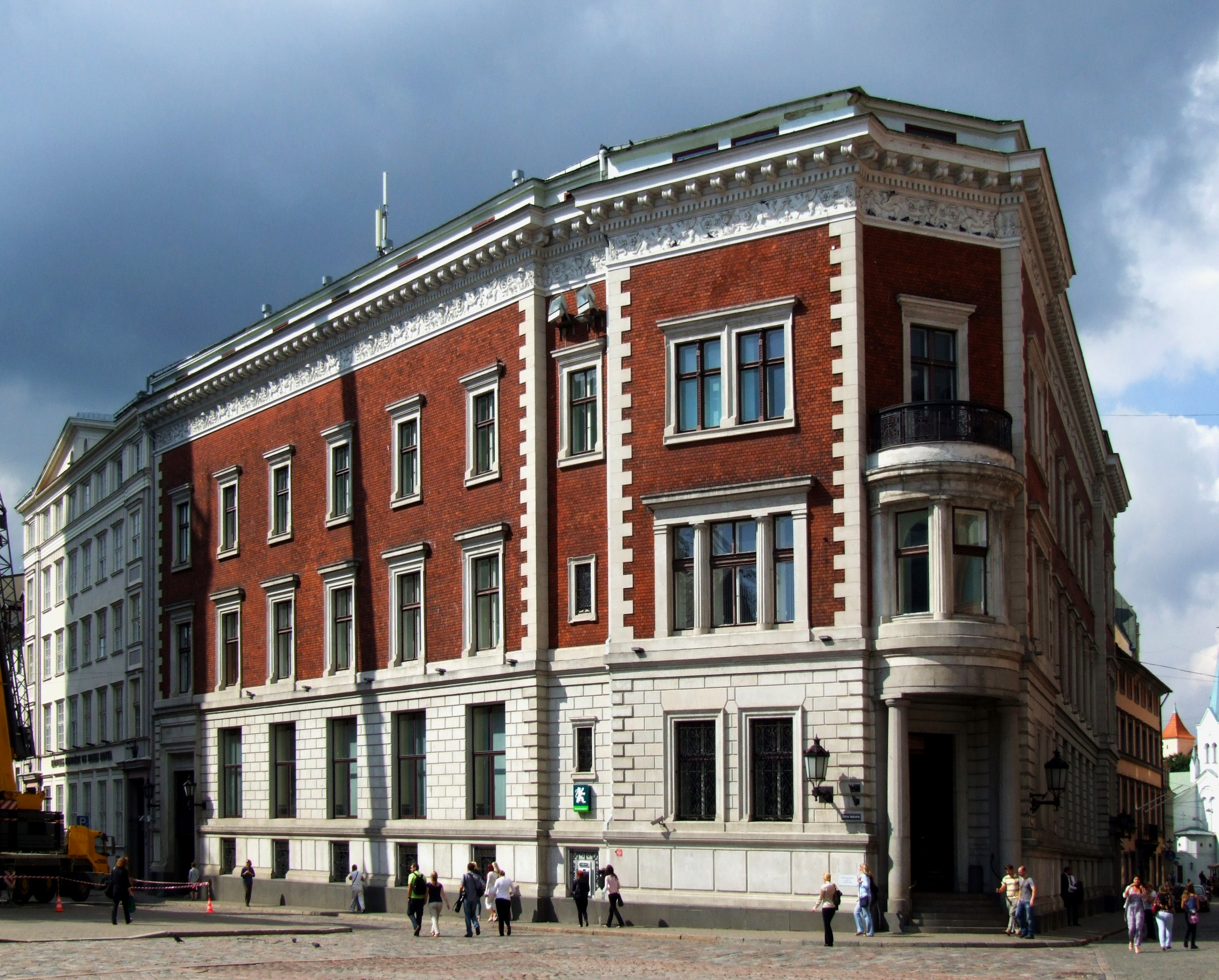
Bank on the Dome Square, Riga. Built in 1887

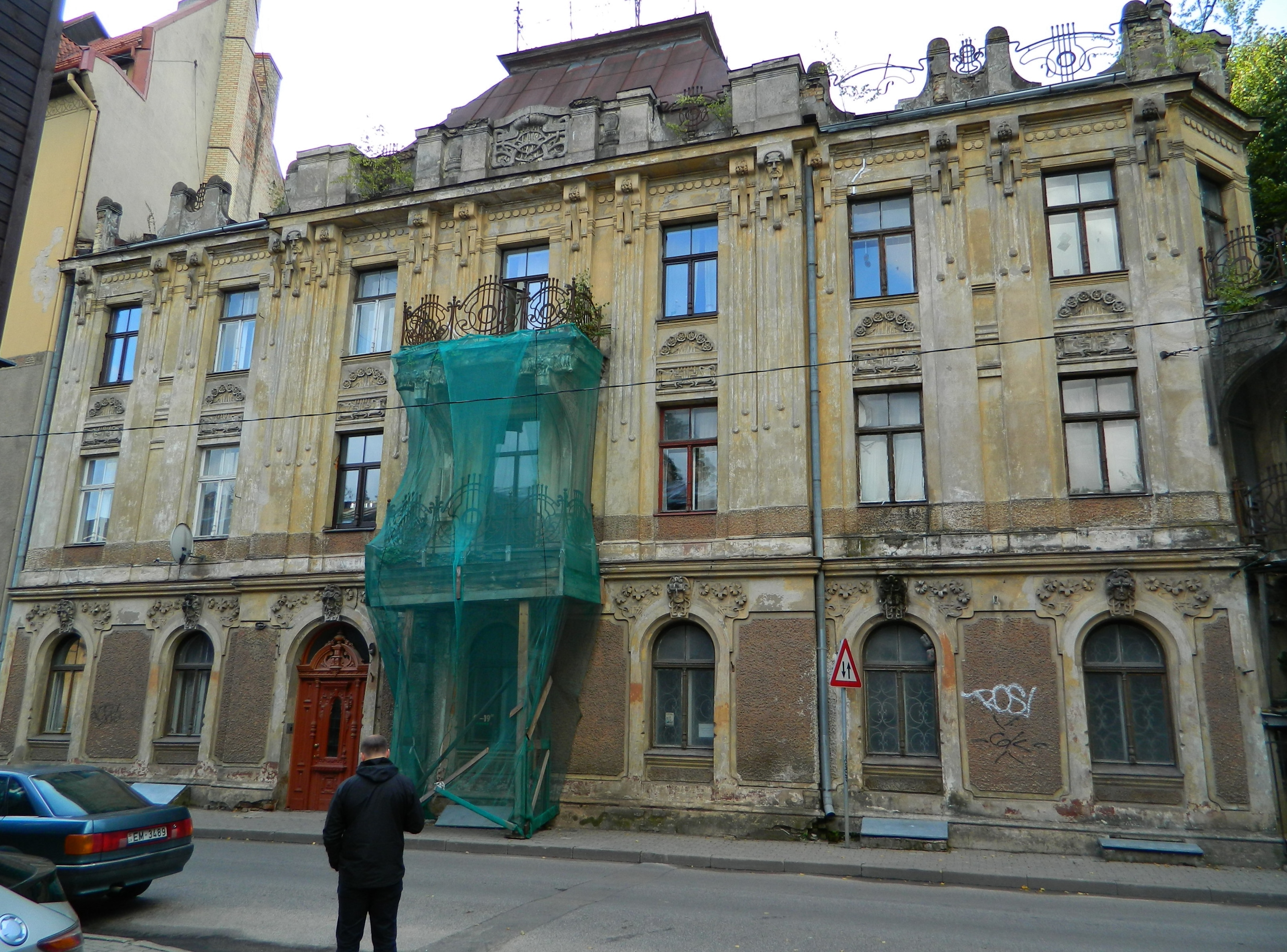
The building Nometņu Street 45, Riga, built around 1903. Together with Friedrich Scheefel.

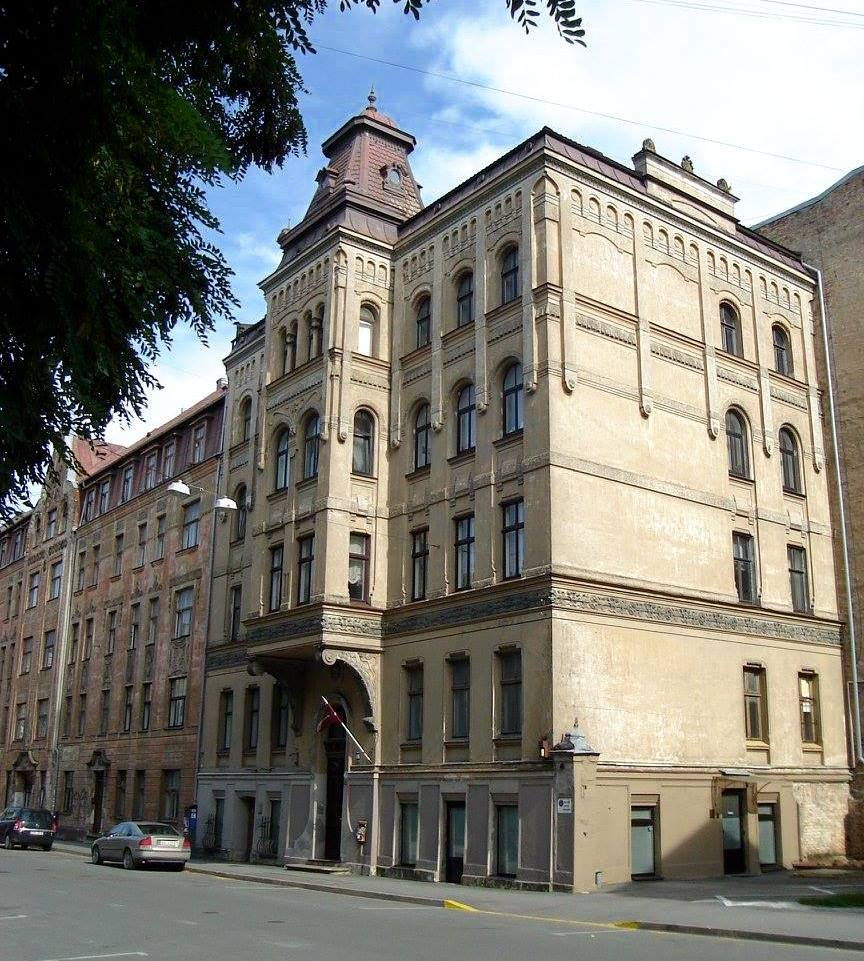
Building on Tērbatas street 86 (together with Friedrich Scheefel), Riga. (1900).

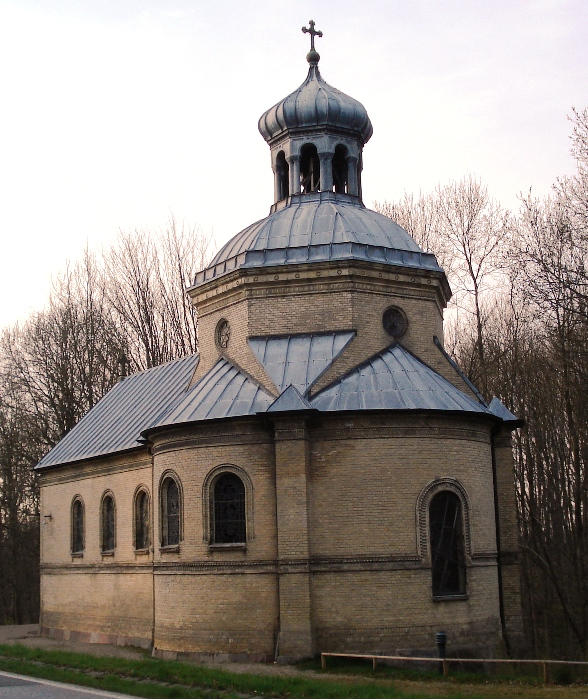
Kapelle Sophienhof in Schellhorn, Germany.
