= Karl Felsko =

Baltic German architect (1844–1919)

- Born: 18 May [O.S. 6 May] 1844; Riga, Governorate of Livonia, Russian Empire
- Died: 1919 (aged 74–75); Riga
- Known for: Architecture
- Movement: Eclecticism

Karl Johann Felsko (Latvian: Kārlis Johans Felsko; 18 May [O.S. 6 May] 1844 – 1919) was an architect and son of chief architect of Riga Johann Daniel Felsko. He was one of the leading architects during the building boom in Riga in the late 19th and early 20th century. There were more than 115 multi-story apartment and public buildings, factories and other buildings built following his designs. He was a master of Eclecticism style. His work, primarily seen in apartment buildings in Riga, included carefully placed filigree elements of order, cornices, pediments, garlands, cartouches, herms and more. His productivity decreased a great deal at the beginning of the 20th century with the introduction of Art Nouveau.

== Education ==
The building arts accompanied Felsko from the cradle; his father was the chief architect of Riga Johann Felsko (1844–1879). Karl Felsko received an excellent academic education. He attended the Riga Lutheran Congregational School and worked with his father in his private practice for three years, but, from 1863 to 1865 he attended Siegen School of Architecture in Westphalia, Germany, then went on to continue his studies at the Berlin Architectural Academy and supplemented his experience and skills by working in the private practice of the German architects Hermann von der Hude and Julius Hennicke. From 1866 to 1867 he studied at St. Petersburg Academy of Arts, where he was awarded the title of Free Artist. Upon returning to Riga he worked as a building inspector in Riga municipality and, at the same time, as an art and drawing instructor at Riga Craftsmen's School. From 1875 to 1887, Felsko was an assistant to the professors Johannes Koch and Gustav Hilbig at Riga Polytechnical Institute.

== Career ==
Karl Felsko was one of the most productive architects during the building boom in Riga of the late 19th century and early 20th century. The only other architects who built more buildings in Riga were Konstantīns Pēkšēns and Jānis Alksnis. More than 115 multi-storey brick apartment and public buildings, factories, and other buildings were constructed following his designs, as well as a still unknown number of wooden houses. Of these, many has disappeared due to the politics of the city leaders in the 1970s and 1980s, an example would be the beautiful wooden building at 175, Brīvības Street (1898, demolished 1988).

== Project portfolio ==
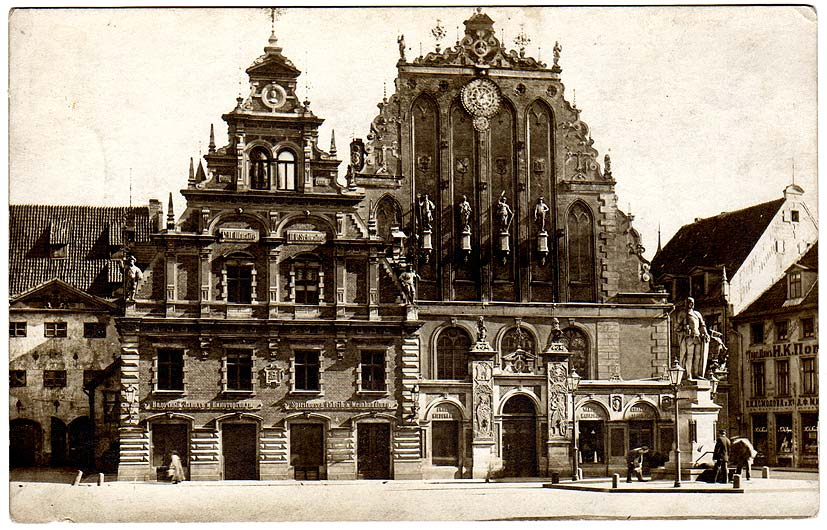
The Schwabe House to the left of House of the Blackheads

It was during the 1880s that an productive phase began in the life of this architect. He was skilled at the Eclecticism style. The artistic methods of Eclecticism were a part of him, his body and soul. In this style, he reached the level of professional virtuosity. His buildings can be found on virtually every corner of Riga.

It is difficult to find a place in the center of the city from which one cannot see a building that is the work of Karl Felsko. Many of them are located in the ensemble of boulevards – for example, on 3, 4, 6 and 9 J. Alunāna Street (1897, 1897, 1879 and 1885), 4 and 12, Elizabetes Street (1883 and 1897), 10 O. Kalpaka Boulevard (1884), and other locations. In Old Riga his buildings are: 7 and 12, Smilšu Street (1890 and 1897), 28 Grēcinieku Street (1896), 7 and 21 Vaļņu Street (1894 and 1893) and 13 Šķūņu Street (1894). Like many others in Old Riga, the latter were created by the reconstruction of an old building. The building at 18 Kaļķu Street (1884), for example, gained two upper floors, while preserving the invaluable Baroque elements and details on the lower part of the building.

From 1889 to 1891 a simple two-storey building next to the famous House of the Blackheads, which belonged to tradesman E. Schmidt, was reconstructed by Felsko. He created a high and very ornate pediment, rich in plasticity, directly facing the Riga City Hall. Its silhouette was similar to that of the Blackheads' House, but with a distinctly different architectural finish. Schmidt rented this building out to the Schwabe Co., and thus it became the Schwabe House to the people. This building was a most characteristic example of Eclecticism, displaying rhythmically intertwined stylised motives from Antique and Renaissance architecture and accented horizontal cornices, which were in a distinct contrast to the vertical arrangements of the Gothic niches of the Blackheads' House.

Next to the City Hall on former 11 Svērtuve Street, used to be another Felsko masterpiece – the Jaksch Trading House (1900–1901), designed and built in collaboration with the architect Karl Neuburger; which was, in its day, the only modern department store in the whole city. This building has also been destroyed, but older residents of Riga still remember its ornate ceramic tile mural, designed by the Nuremberg architect Theodor Eyrich. It had a steel structure, and one of the first electric elevators in Riga.

Felsko's work incorporated many innovations in the building arts of his day. For example, the apartment block he designed at 25, Krišjāņa Street or 26, Blaumaņa Street (1896) was one of the first buildings whose plans were very close to the section-type buildings produced still in the 1980s. Mostly though, Felsko designed and constructed apartment buildings. Some of these were the home of the wealthy and elite residents of the city – villas, such as the businessman Dāvis Ezītis' house at 59, Elizabetes Street (1889), 9, Aristīda Briāna Street (1883 and 1889) or the villa at 37, Slokas Street (1892), which belonged to the owner of the Herminghaus und Woormann machine factory. A similar architectural approach is to be found in the building that belonged to the businessman Richard Chromse, which is located at 25 Baznīcas Street (1897), and has sculptural ornamentations designed by the popular Riga artist August Volz. This is similar to other buildings designed by Felsko – at 27/29 Krišjāņa Valdemāra Street (1902), 3, Elizabetes Street (1899), 36, Lāčplēša Street (1900), 49, Ģertrūdes Street (1906) and some others. These are all multi-storey brick apartment buildings, which effectively reflect the architectural style and character of the cityscape in the latter half of the 19th century. Another contribution in this sphere by Felsko is the series of apartment buildings at 157, 173, 193 and 195, Brīvības Street (1898, 1897, 1898 and 1895), 9, 55, 71, 111, 117 and 123 Dzirnavu Street (1880, 1881, 1883, 1896, 1884 and 1887), 24, 26 and 75 Elizabetes Street (1897, 1897 and 1890), and 1, 4 and 5 Marijas Street (1884, 1896 and 1895). The second half of the 19th century in Riga's architectural history is often referred to as the period of apartment buildings.

== Late Eclecticism ==
The increase in protruding and voluminous details was a distinguishing symptom in the development of Eclecticism in its later period. The most characteristic works by Felsko in this period are the already mentioned apartment buildings at 25, Baznīcas Street and 27/29, Krišjāņa Valdemāra Street, as well as the buildings at 43, Dzirnavu Street (1898), 3, Elizabetes Street (1899), 22, 39 and 49, Ģertrūdes Street (1897, 1899 and 1906), 1 and 1a, A. Kalniņa Street (both 1895), and 13 and 36, Lāčplēša Street (both 1900). The facades of these buildings are like fantastic paintings with very carefully placed filigree elements of orders, cornices, pediments, garlands, cartouches, herms and many other elements of architectural and decorative finish. The reproduction of older, historical means of expression, on which the Eclecticism style was based, is, for the most part, centered on the free interpretation of the forms of the Renaissance; however, it is also possible to encounter Neo-Gothic and other Neo-styles. Neo-Gothicism, in Felsko's interpretation, can be seen on the apartment buildings at 8, Merķeļa Street (1882), and partly on the former pumping station at 194, Maskavas Street (1897). The latter building can be classified also as an example of a specific sub-style of Eclecticism, the so-called brick style. Another example of it is the Krüger water therapy institution at 18, Baznīcas Street (1884), or a whole series of factory buildings by Felsko – for example, the former Russian-Rhine lead paint factory at 130, Krišjāņa Barona Street (1902–1917), the Phoenix carriage and machine factory at 201, Brīvības Street (1895), and others. Felsko had an excellent understanding of various finishing materials. At times, he intertwined bricks with details molded from cement. Such touches are found at the former riding hall at 8, Strēlnieku Street (1895), the city orphan's home at 8, Zeļļu Street (1888; in collaboration with architect Karl Neuburger), the gas holder at 106, Matisa Street (1901), and others. Strict, heavily rustic formal language of the Florentine Renaissance style was employed in the designs of the former Zigra bath-houses at 10, Vaļņu Street (1887), the apartment house at 4, Basteja Boulevard (1898), and several other facades of his buildings.

== Art Nouveau ==
At the beginning of the 20th century, during the blooming of Art Nouveau, the incredible productivity of Felsko visibly decreased. The creative method of the new style was too far from and foreign to his artistic thinking and approach, even though, already in 1897, the design of the apartment building at 41/43, Tērbatas Street anticipated ornamental elements in the forms of Art Nouveau. These ideas, however, did not materialise or develop further, but in 1903 a very imposing building appeared at 28, Blaumaņa Street. Its Neo-Gothic facade ornamentation was interwoven with a multitude of monsters, birds, chimeras, bears, masks, and other typically Art Nouveau decorations and metalwork. The building successfully accentuates the crossing of Pērses and Blaumaņa Streets, and there is a small forecourt on Krišjāņa Barona Street.

The above-mentioned items constitute only a small portion of what the architect achieved for his city in his very busy and productive life and career. Before World War I, together with Eižens Laube and Wilhelm Bockslaff, he was one of three Riga Building Board official advisers dealing with the questions of architecture.

== Gallery ==
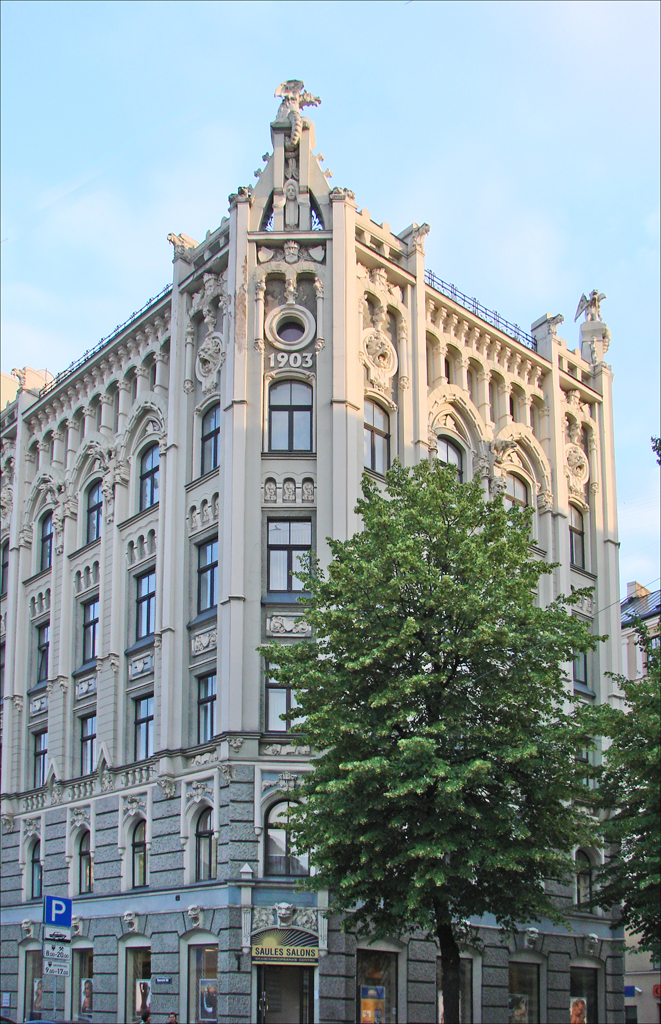
Residential building on the Blaumaņa street 28, Riga (1903)

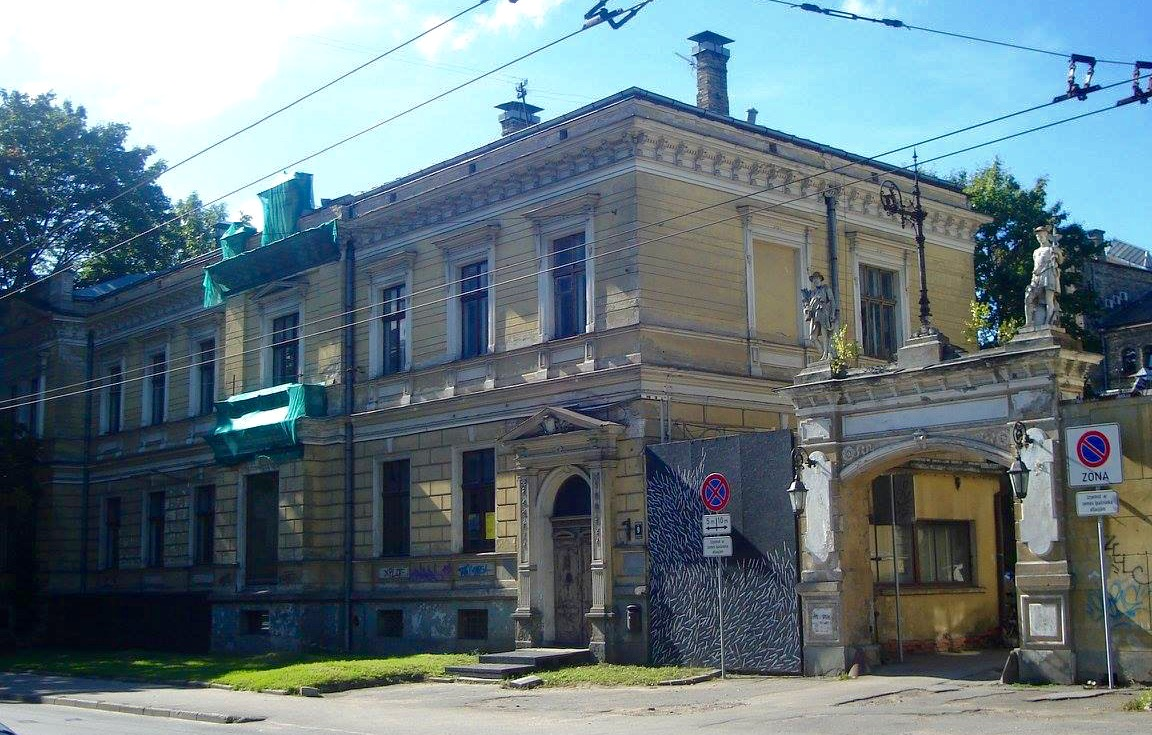
Building on the A. Briāna street 9 (former mansion of the von Strizky family), Riga. (1883)

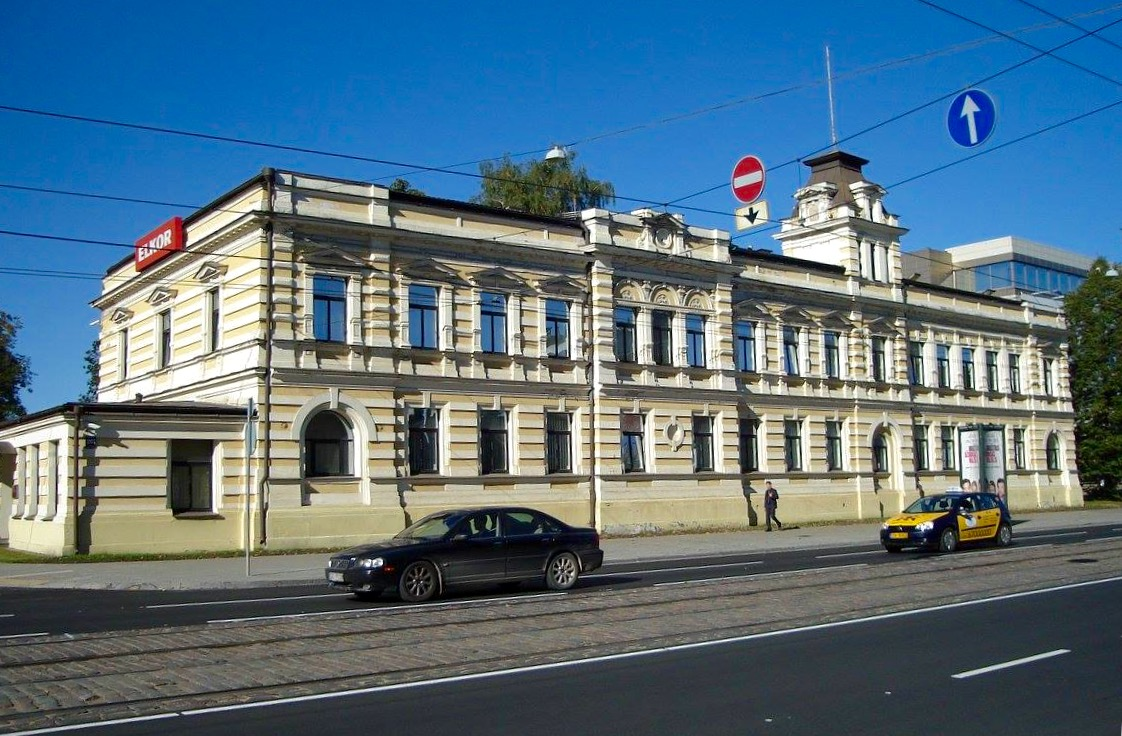
Administration building of the former factory Phoenix on the Brīvības street 201, Riga. (1895–98).

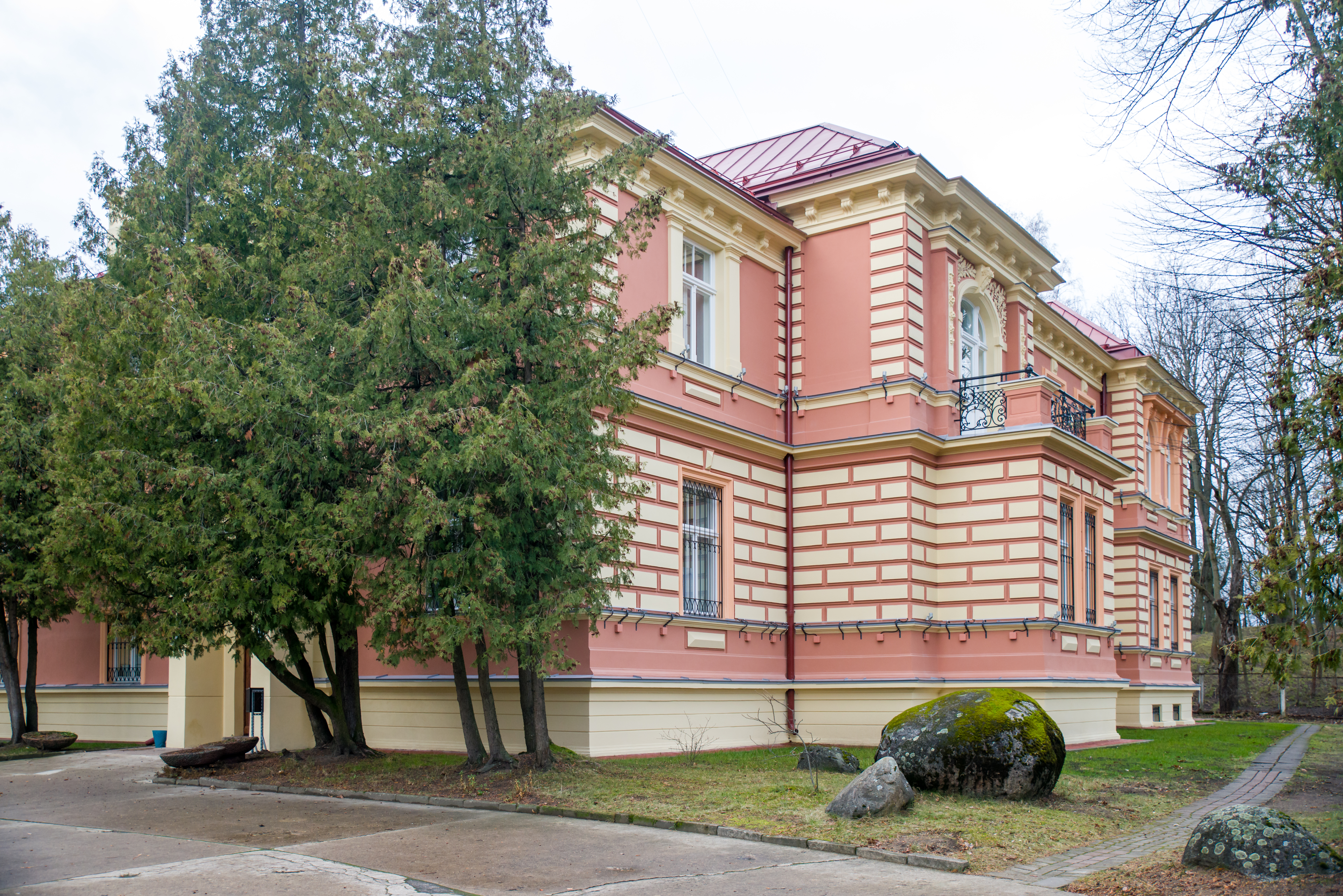
Mansion on the Slokas street 37, Riga. (1892)

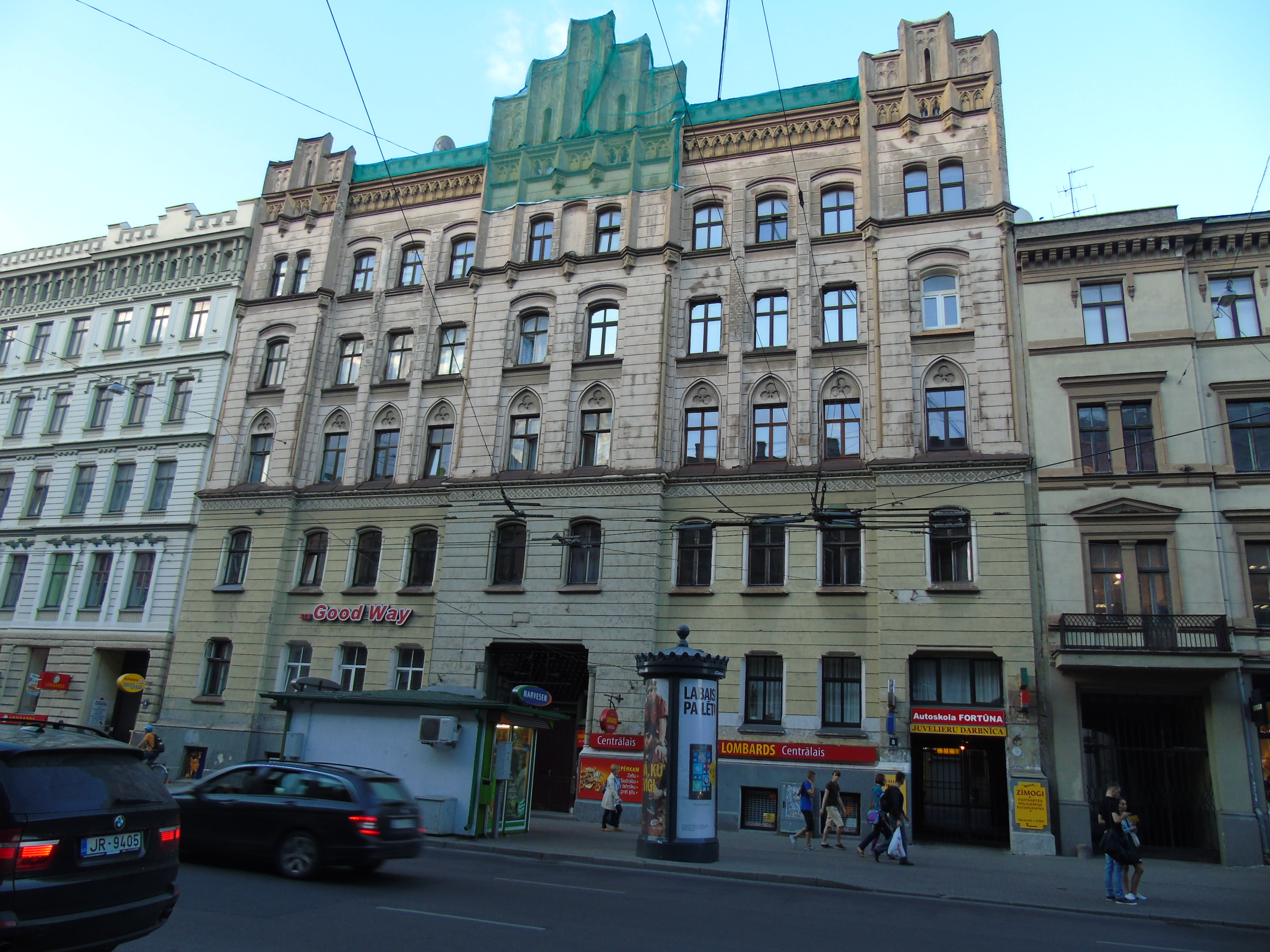
Residential building on the Merķeļa street 8, Riga. (1882).

== See also ==
- List of Baltic German architects

== Sources ==
- Krastiņš, Jānis (2002). Rīgas arhitektūras meistari 1850-1940 : The masters of architecture of Riga 1850-1940 (in Latvian and English). Riga: Jumava. ISBN 9984-05-450-0. OCLC 52258305.
