= Johann Felsko =

Baltic German architect (1813–1902)

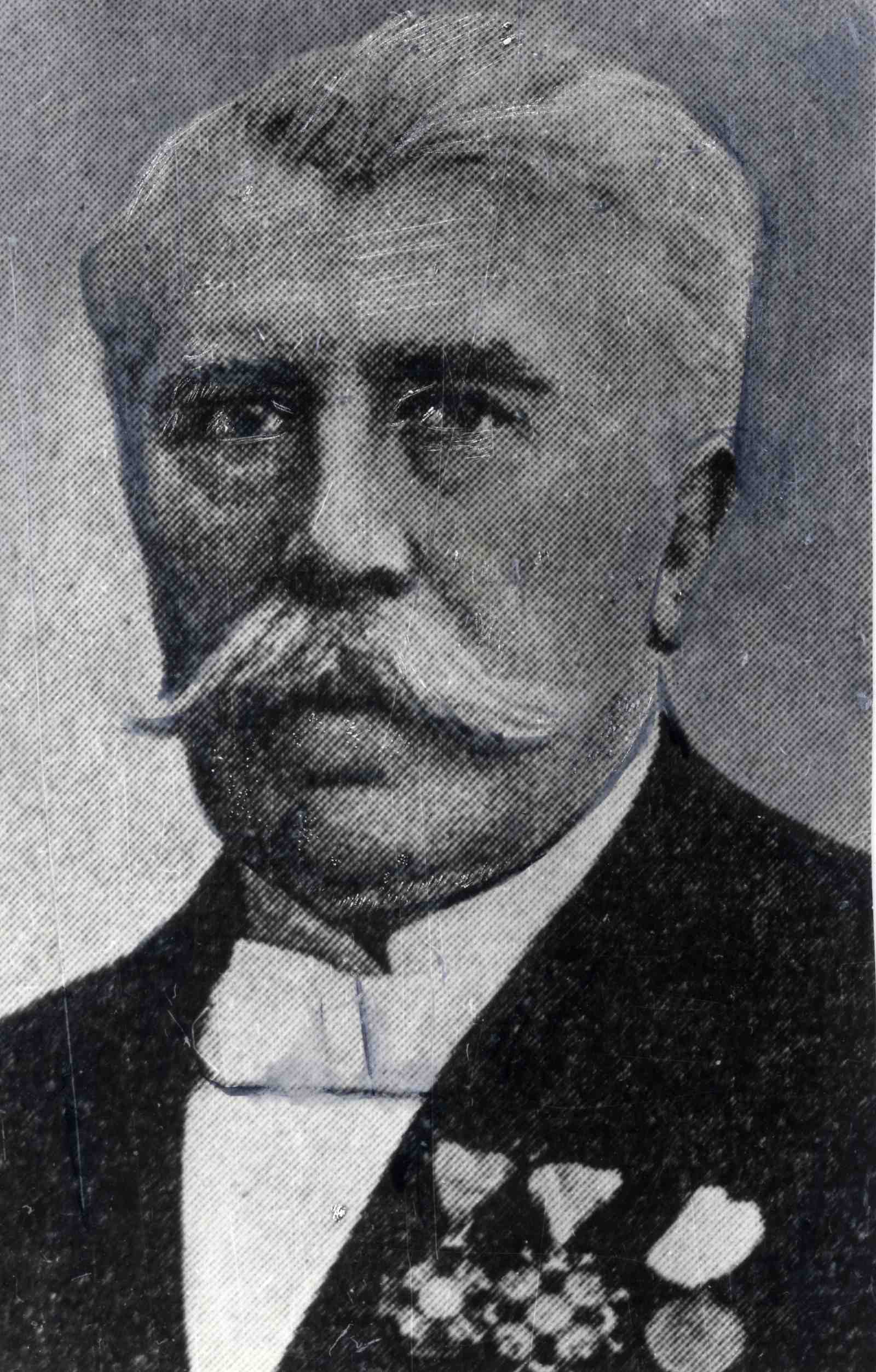
- Born: 30 October [O.S. 18 October] 1813; Riga, Governorate of Livonia, Russian Empire
- Died: 7 October [O.S. 24 September] 1902; Riga, Governorate of Livonia, Russian Empire
- Known for: Architecture
- Notable work: Small guild
- Movement: Neo-Gothic

Johann Daniel Felsko (also Felskau; Latvian: Johans Daniels Felsko; 30 October [O.S. 18 October] 1813 – 7 October [O.S. 24 September] 1902) was a Baltic German architect, urban planner and the chief architect of Riga for 35 years in the period 1844–1879. The most significant accomplishment of his creative work is the development of the center of Riga.

== Early life ==
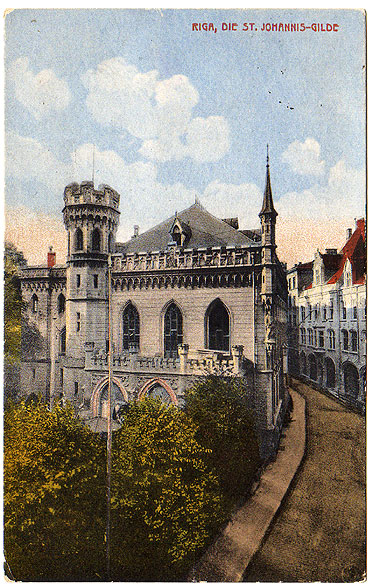
The Small Guild

Johann Felsko was born 30 October 1813 in Riga as son of mason Johan Jakob Felskau (1779—1858), who 1805 emigrated from Königsberg, East Prussia, to settle in Riga. Johann's mother was Therese Luise Heydemann (died 1868) from Schönberg in Courland. Johann Felsko married Georgine Wilhelmine Groos from Copenhagen, Denmark in 1842; they had three children, two of them being architect Karl Johann (1844—1918) and painter Oskar Eduard Daniel (born 1848).

== Education ==
Johann Felsko learned the building profession by being an apprentice to architect of Riga and master of the craft Johann Daniel Gottfriedt, until Gottfriedt died 1831. His education continued into the arts of technical drawing with Johann Adolf Spazier until 1832, which then led his travels as an apprentice via Königsberg, East Prussia, to work on fortifications with Captain Gersohn in Warsaw, on whose recommendations he went to Copenhagen, Denmark, then later to Posen, and then back to Denmark, in Hillerød. Felsko studied architecture at the Royal Danish Academy of Fine Arts from 1835—40. With a scholarship from the Riga City Council, his studies continued at the St. Petersburg Academy of Arts, where he 1851 was awarded the degree of Free Artist.

== Creator of modern Riga ==
One of the first large projects by Felsko was the reconstruction of the Riga City Hall in 1848. He constructed a third storey on top of the almost 100-year-old monument of the Classicism style, while still preserving its harmonic scale and the overall historic character of the building. In 1849 Felsko renovated the Neo-Gothic spire of St. John's Church, which remains in place to this day. In 1856 Tsar Alexander II of Russia approved the demolition of the city fortifications, and Felsko together with his colleague Otto Dietze began the development of a plan for the reconstruction of the city without delay. In the fall of that year, the work was done. In the following year, the Tsar approved this plan, and the same fall, the residents of Riga began digging up the old fortifications. The initial project underwent several alterations in order to decrease the costs, significantly however, Felsko's basic ideas were preserved and gradually were implemented in the construction of the semicircle of Riga's boulevards. The result is a superb urban ensemble with a canal — formed from the moat of the fortifications — becoming the central axis of the composition, which in turn, borders with free-standing public buildings, green spaces and separate blocks of apartment buildings. In the 1870s, the citadel fortress was also torn down, and the esplanade territory of the fortress was re-designed following the guidelines advanced in the designs of Felsko and Dietze.

== Favourite Neo-Gothic style ==
This master is also the author of several schools: the municipal grammar school, which now houses the Riga State Gymnasium No.1 at 8, Raiņa Boulevard (1874), another grammar school, now the Riga State Gymnasium No.2 at 1, Krišjāņa Valdemāra Street (1876—79), and the Craftsmen's Association School at 34, Aspāzijas Boulevard (1876). He also designed the Sadovnikow home for the poor at 20, Sadovņikova Street (1873), various apartment buildings at 49, Elizabetes Street (1870), 2, Antonijas Street (1879), 71, Brīvības Street (1879), 11, Šķūņu Street (1854) and a few others. Felsko utilised a rather wide spectrum of the formal elements of Eclecticism style in his buildings, elements of the Renaissance and of the Rundbogenstil can be found; however; his favourite was Neo-Gothic. This style appears in completely different forms and tones from building to building. Felsko, in his reconstruction project for Riga's center envisioned the riverbank development of the Daugava in a Neo-Gothic style as well; however; this particular dream of his remained unfulfilled. He applied the same vision to the municipal gas works at 1, Basteja Boulevard (1861), which, however; no longer possesses the imposing gas tanks that once stood there.

Perhaps one of the most effective of Felsko buildings is the Small Guild at 3/5 Amatu Street (1864—66) in Riga Old Town. This building's architecture is in harmony with that of its slightly older neighbour - the Large Guild. Felsko arranged a small square in front of the very bulky Medieval-like construction that already stood there. This feature was evaluated very positively by his contemporaries. The interior is very grand and ornate. Many of the windows are decorated with stained glass from Hanover. In the windows of the rooms now used by actors, the portraits of the author of the paintings, as well as that of Felsko can be seen.

A whole array of churches were also fathered by the design of Felsko: St. Martin's Church (1851), St. Gertrude Old Church (1863—68), the St. Saviour's Anglican Church (1859), Holy Trinity Church in the suburb of Sarkandaugava (1876—78), the St. Ann (1857—59) and St. Nicolai Church (1873—74), both on the lands of the Piņķi Mansion. All of them are Neo-Gothic in style with colourful and eloquent architectural touches.

== Gallery ==
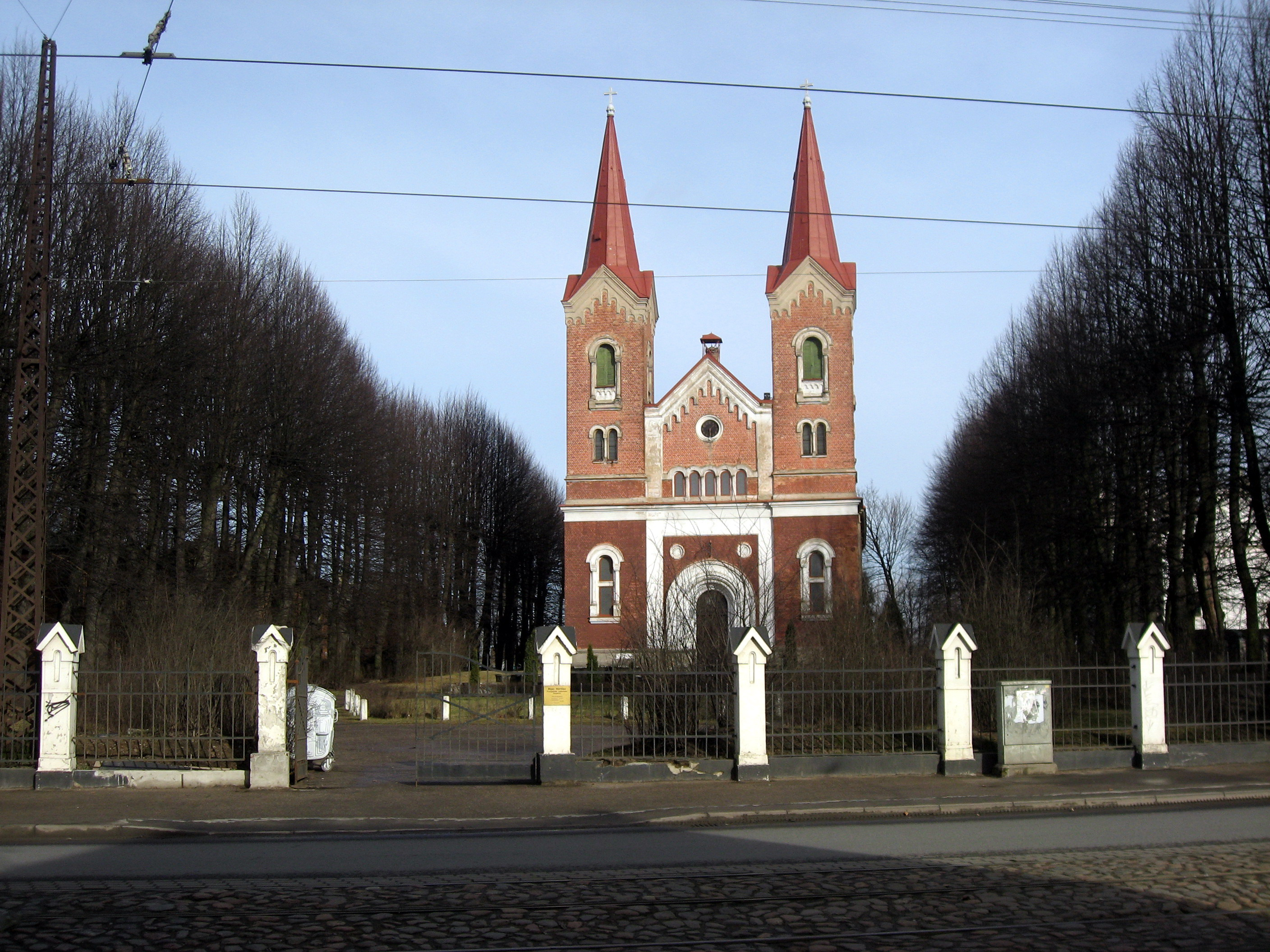
St.Martin Lutheran church in Riga

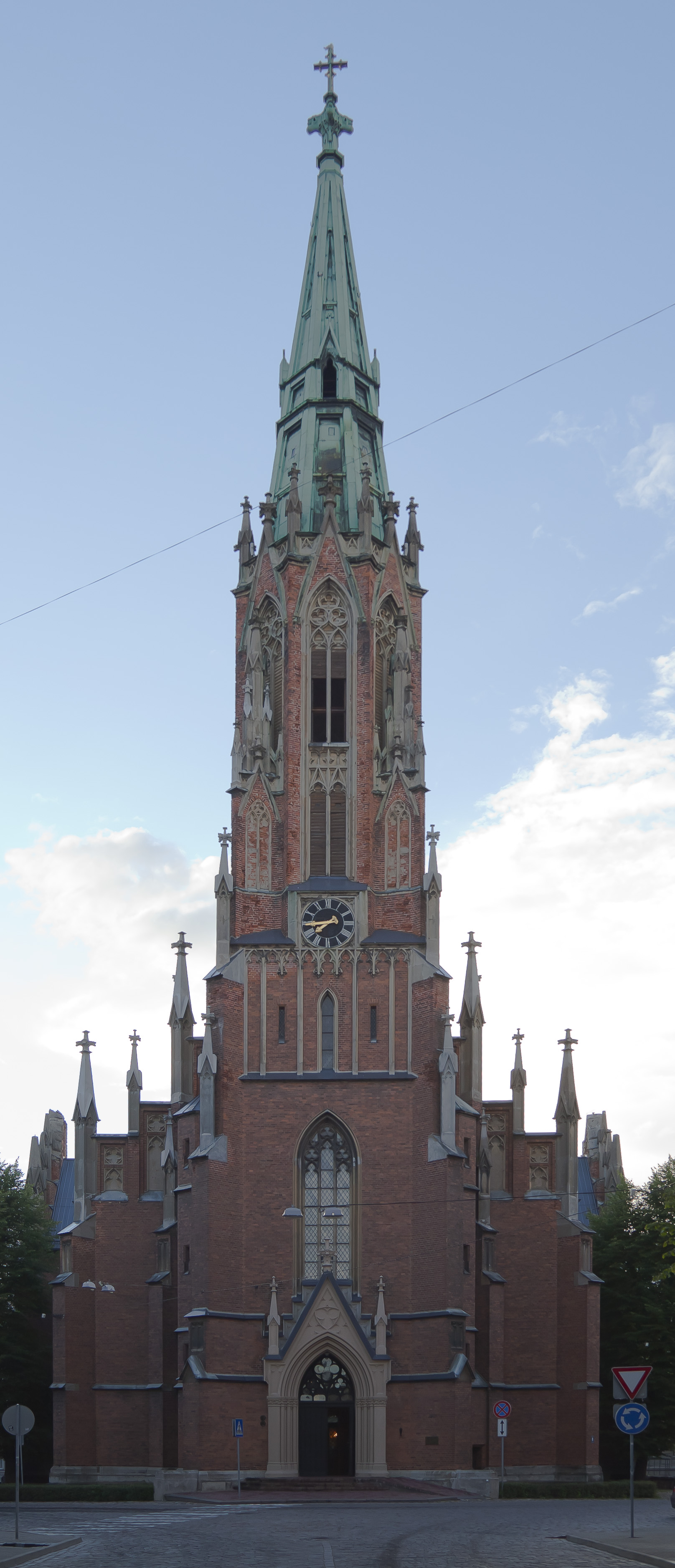
Old St. Gertrude church in Riga

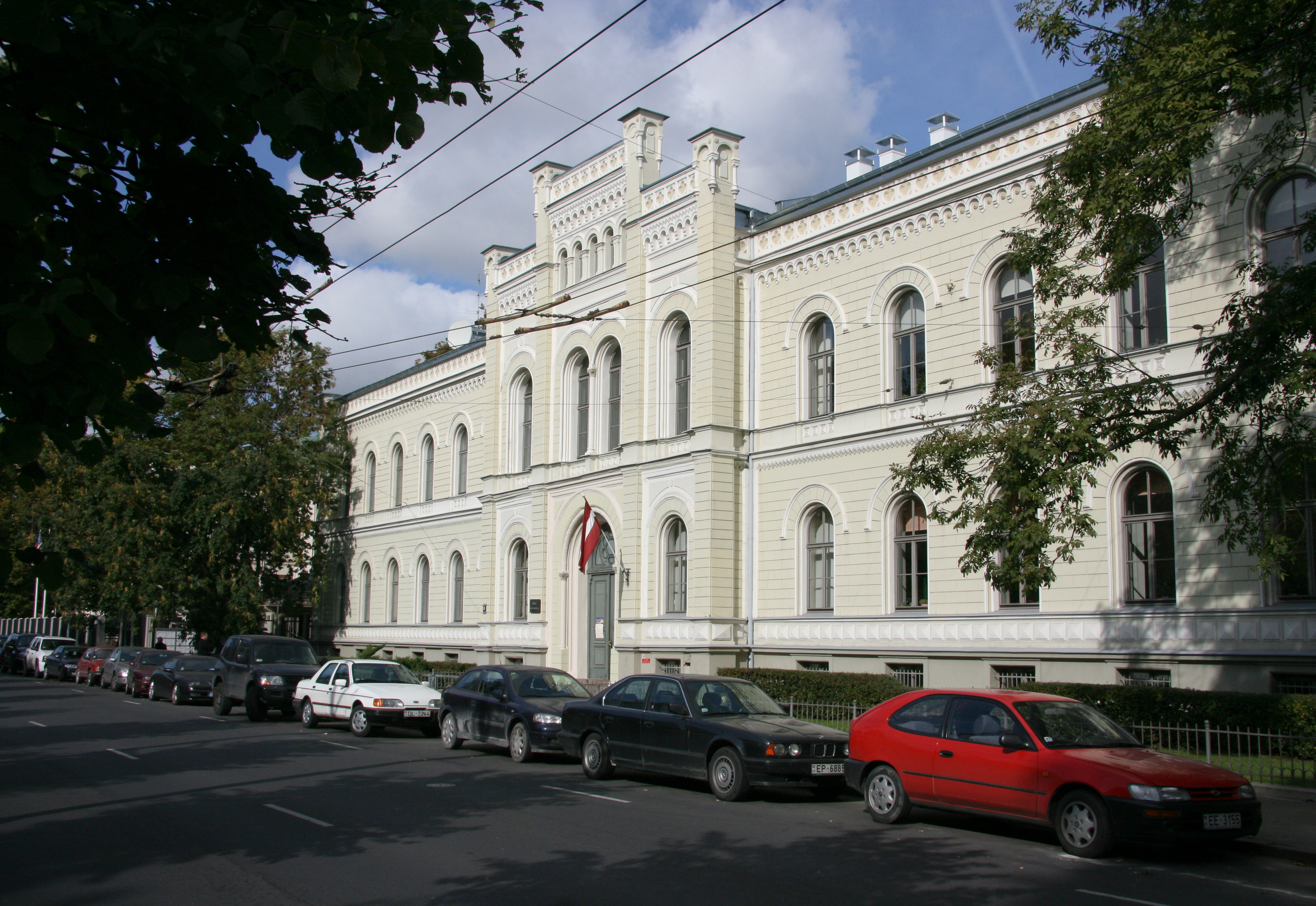
Riga State Gymnasium No.1
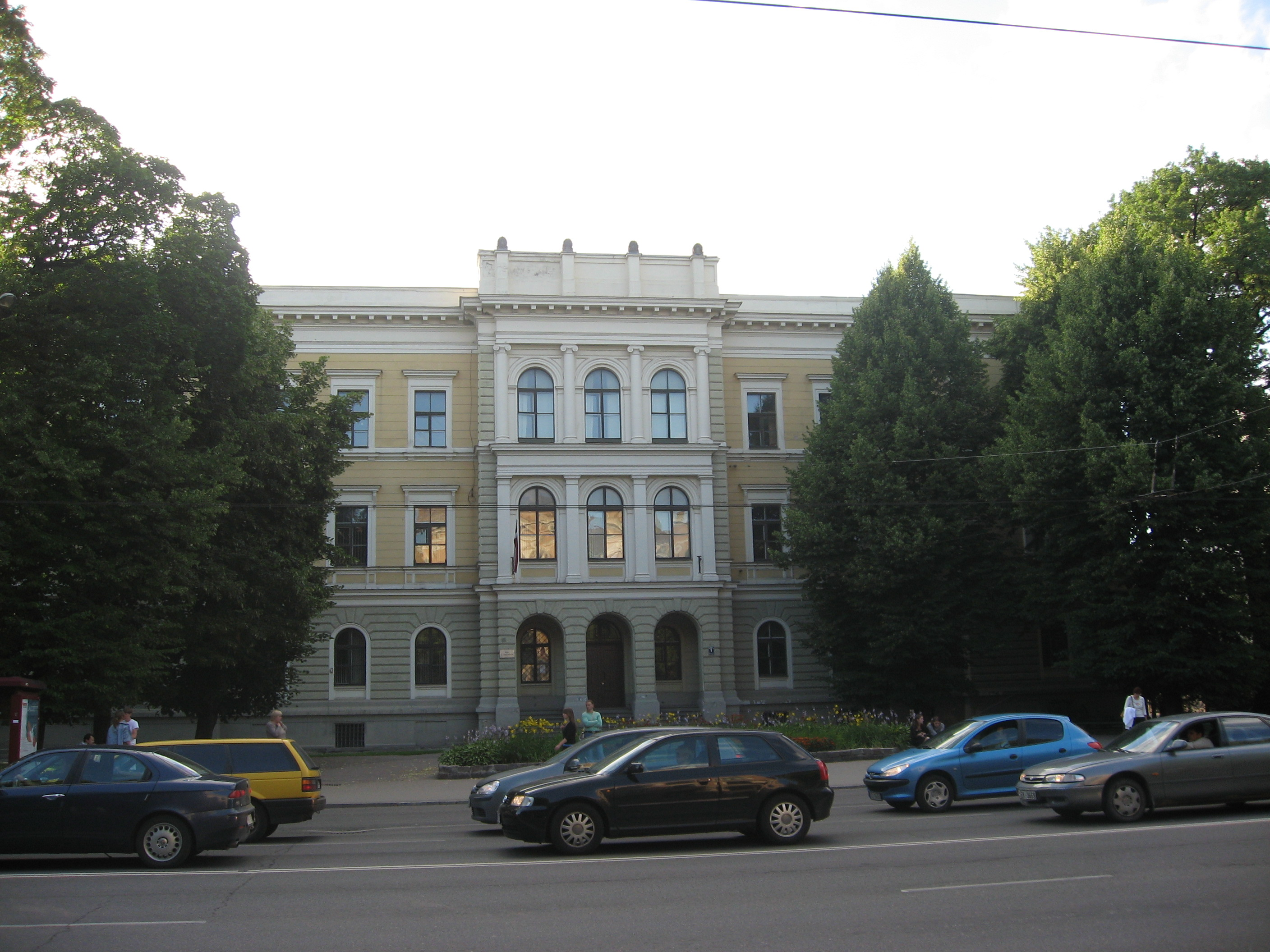
Riga State Gymnasium No.2

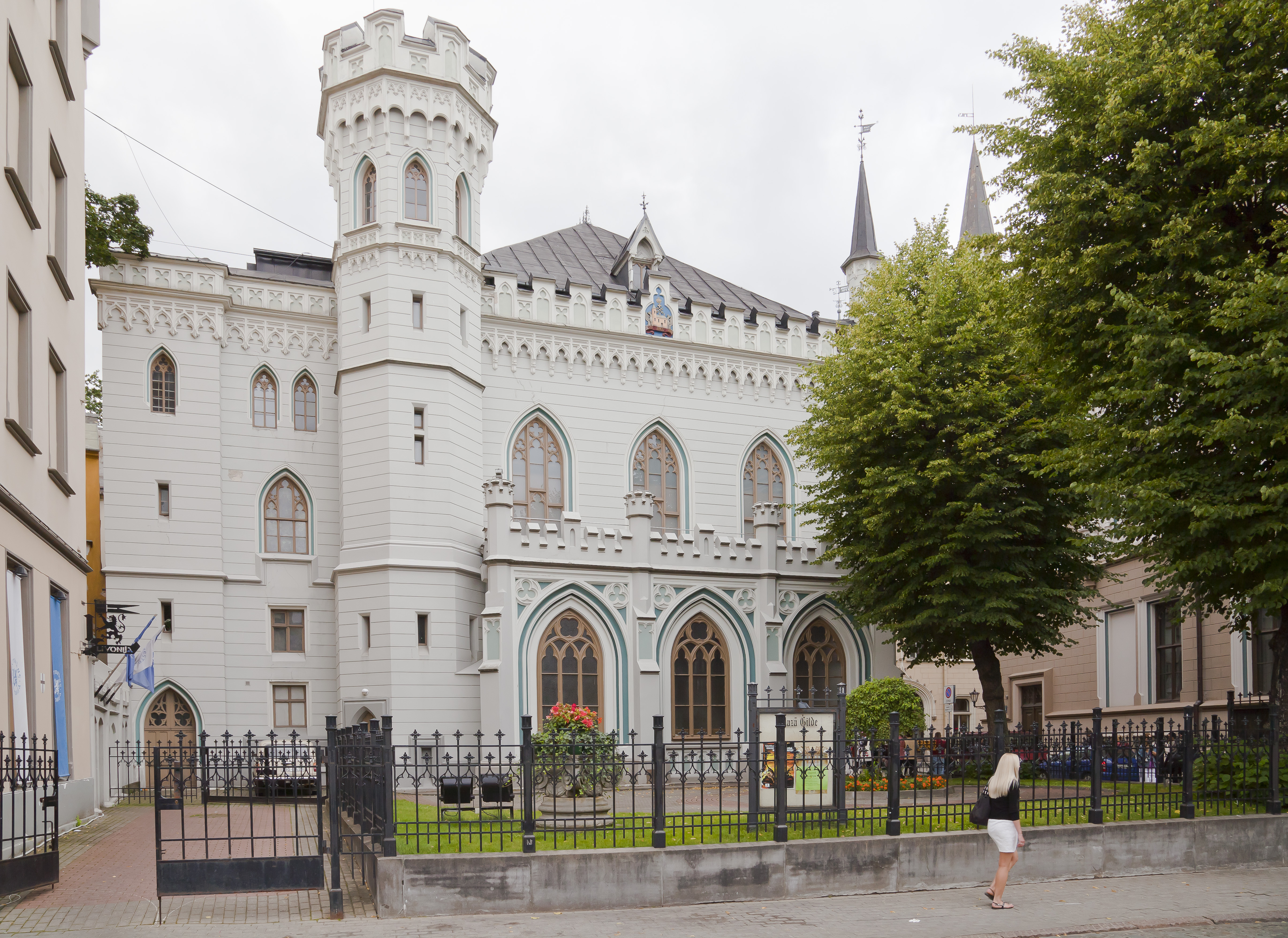
The Small Guild, Riga

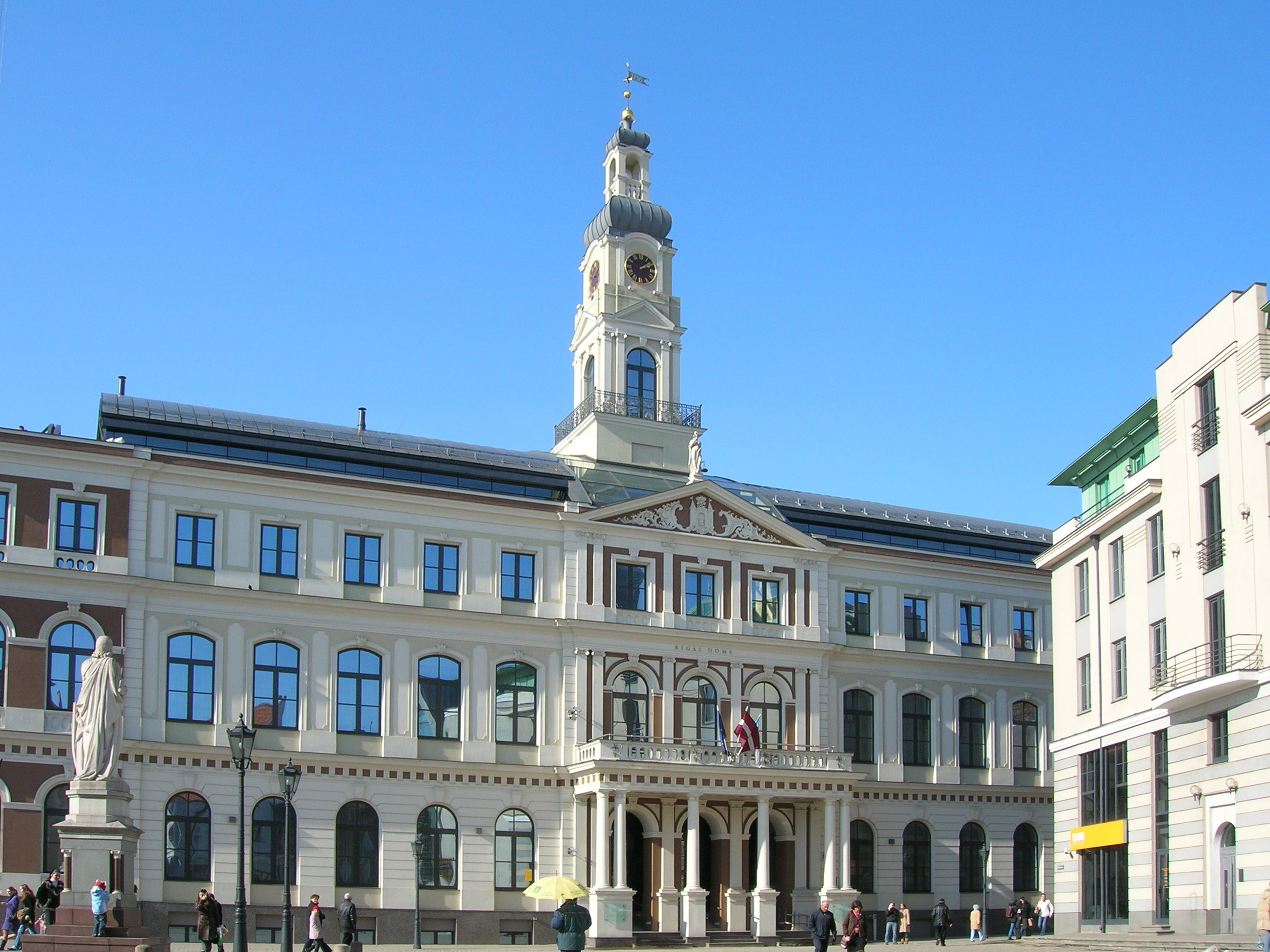
Riga Town Hall

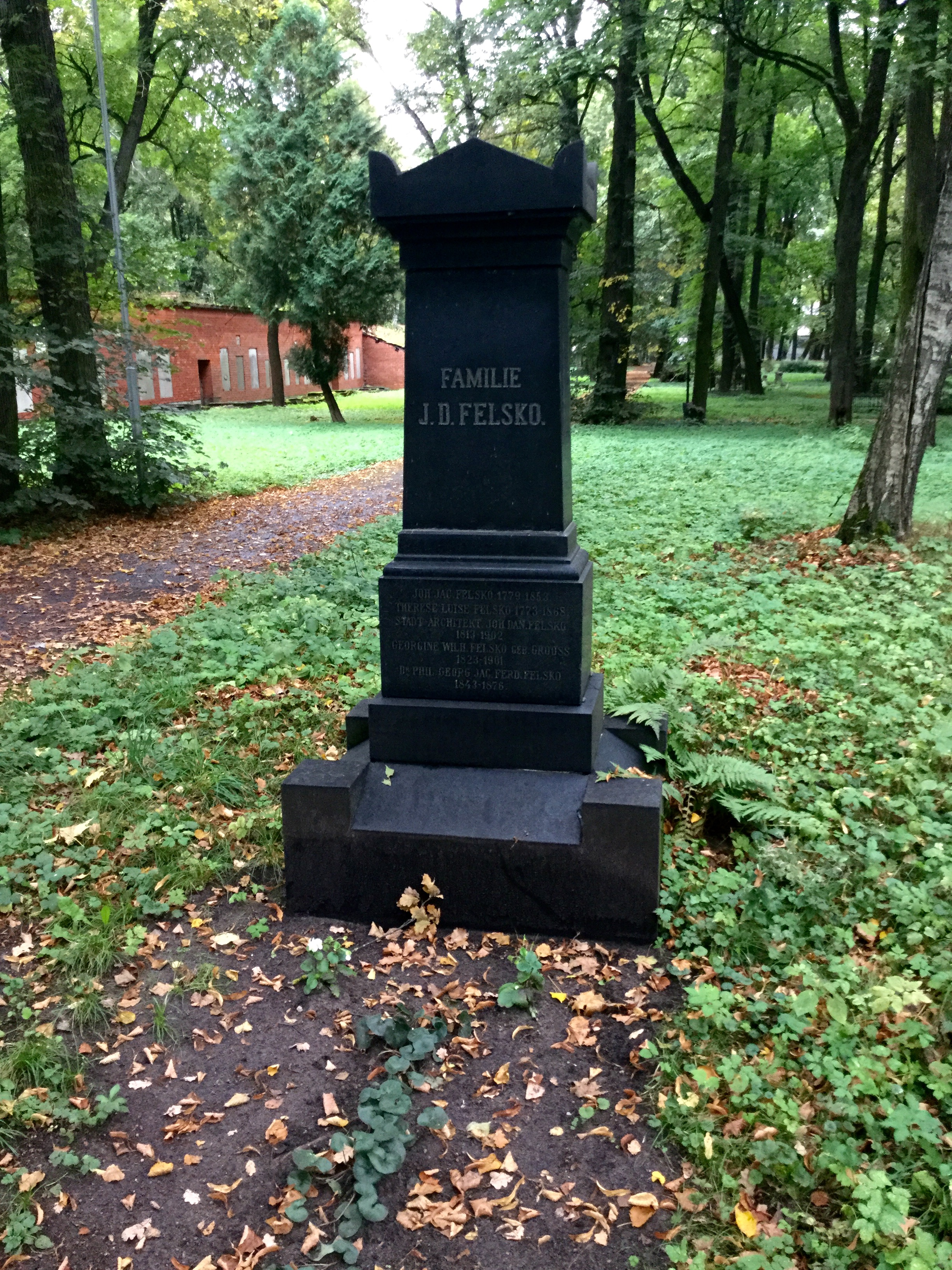
Tombstone of the Felsko family at the Riga Great Cemetery.

== See also ==
- List of Baltic German architects

== Bibliography ==
- Krastinš, Janis (2002). Rigas arhitektūras meistari 1850-1940 : The masters of architecture of Riga 1850-1940 (in Latvian and English). Riga: Jumava. ISBN 9984-05-450-0. OCLC 52258305.
