= Otto Dietze =

German-born architect

- Born: July 1, 1833; Chemnitz, Kingdom of Saxony (Now: Germany)
- Died: October 17, 1890 (aged 57); Riga, Russian Empire (Now Latvia).
- Known for: architecture
- Movement: Historicism

Otto Dietze (Latvian: Oto Dīce) (1 July 1833, Chemnitz – 17 October 1890, Riga) was a German-born architect.

Together with Johan Daniel Felsko they worked on the new Riga general plan after demolishing of city walls from 1856 until 1857. He designed several buildings on the new boulevards of Riga.

He is most noted for his work in Jelgava from 1863–1872 when he was a chief architect of the city. He designed the Latvian pastor St. Peter's House (1864), the railway station and residential houses.

In Kuldīga he rebuilt the ancient brick bridge across the Venta River (1874).

== Gallery ==
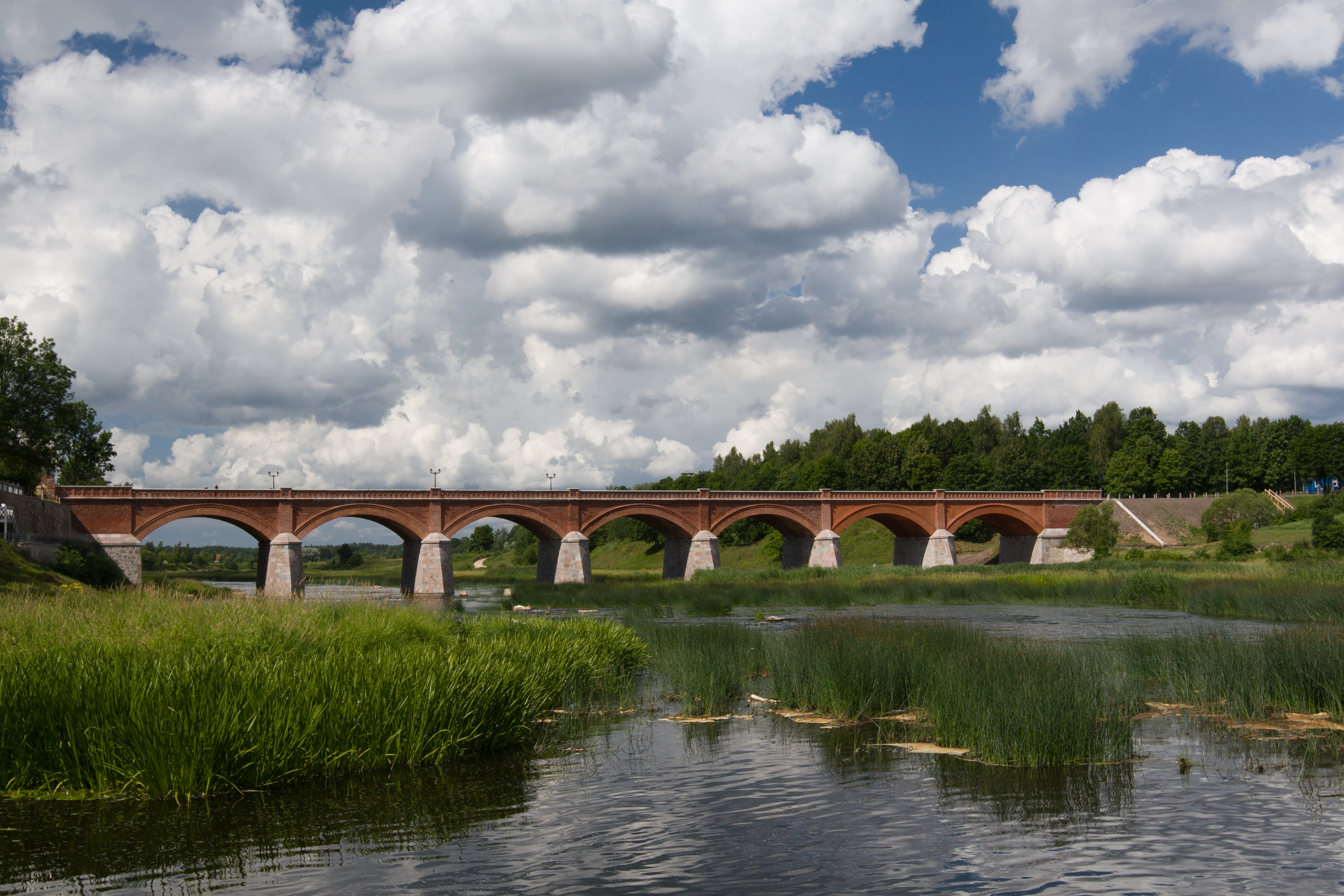
Kuldīga vaulted brick bridge (1874)

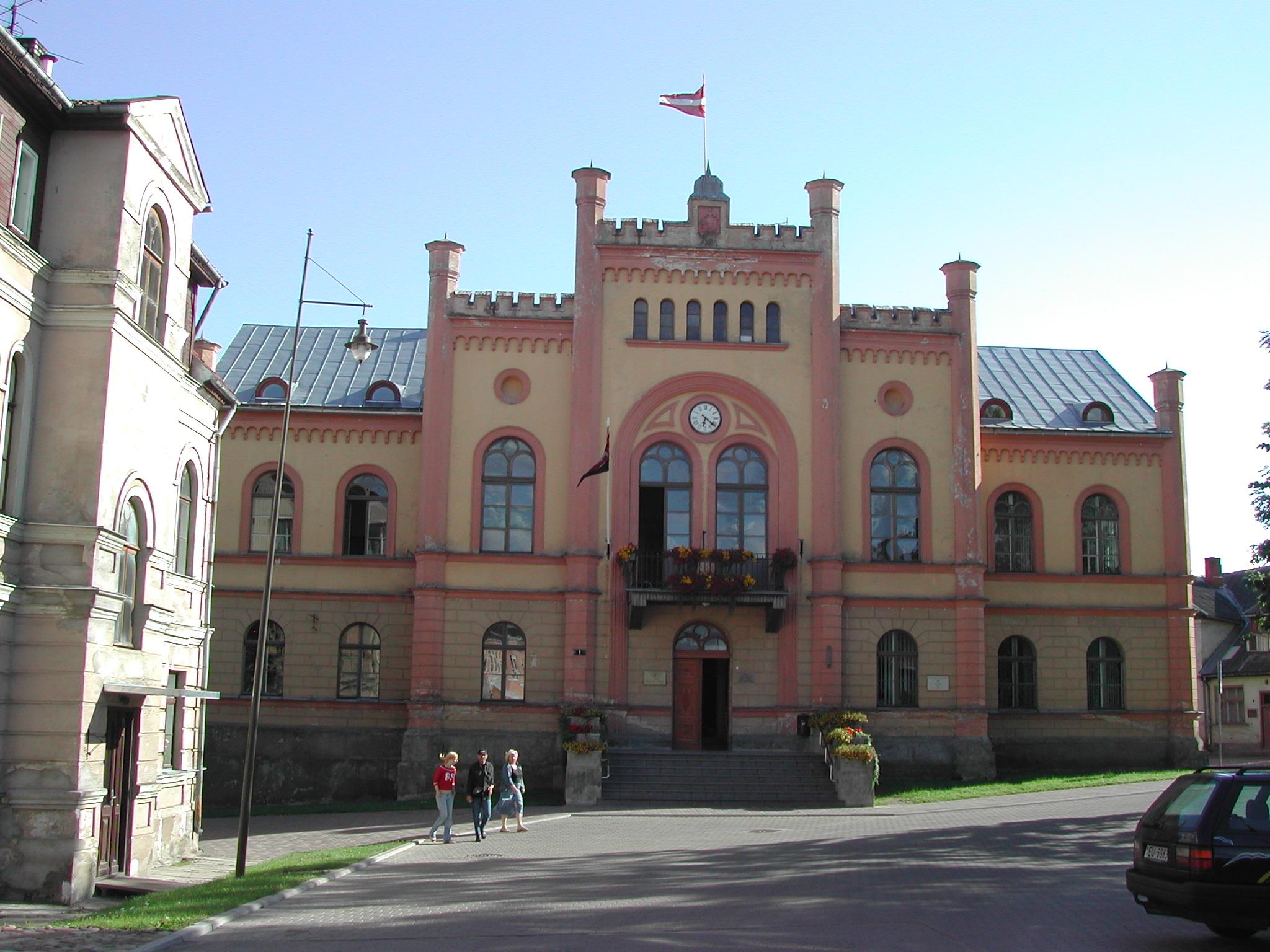
Kuldīga town hall (1868)

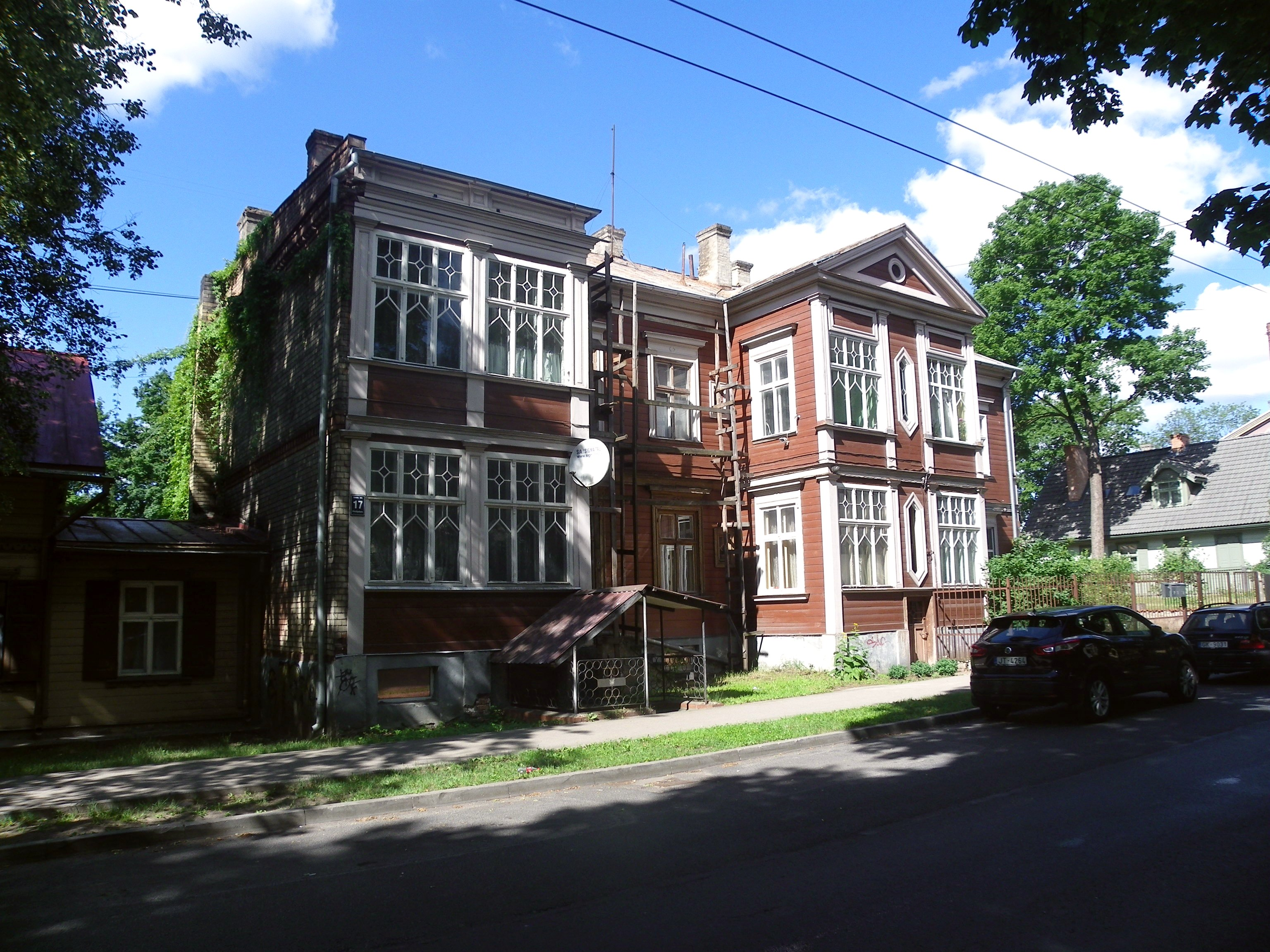
Residental building on Baložu street 17, Rīga. (1883)
