= Large Guild, Riga =

Historical building in Old Riga, Riga, Latvia

Large Guild
- Lielā ģilde
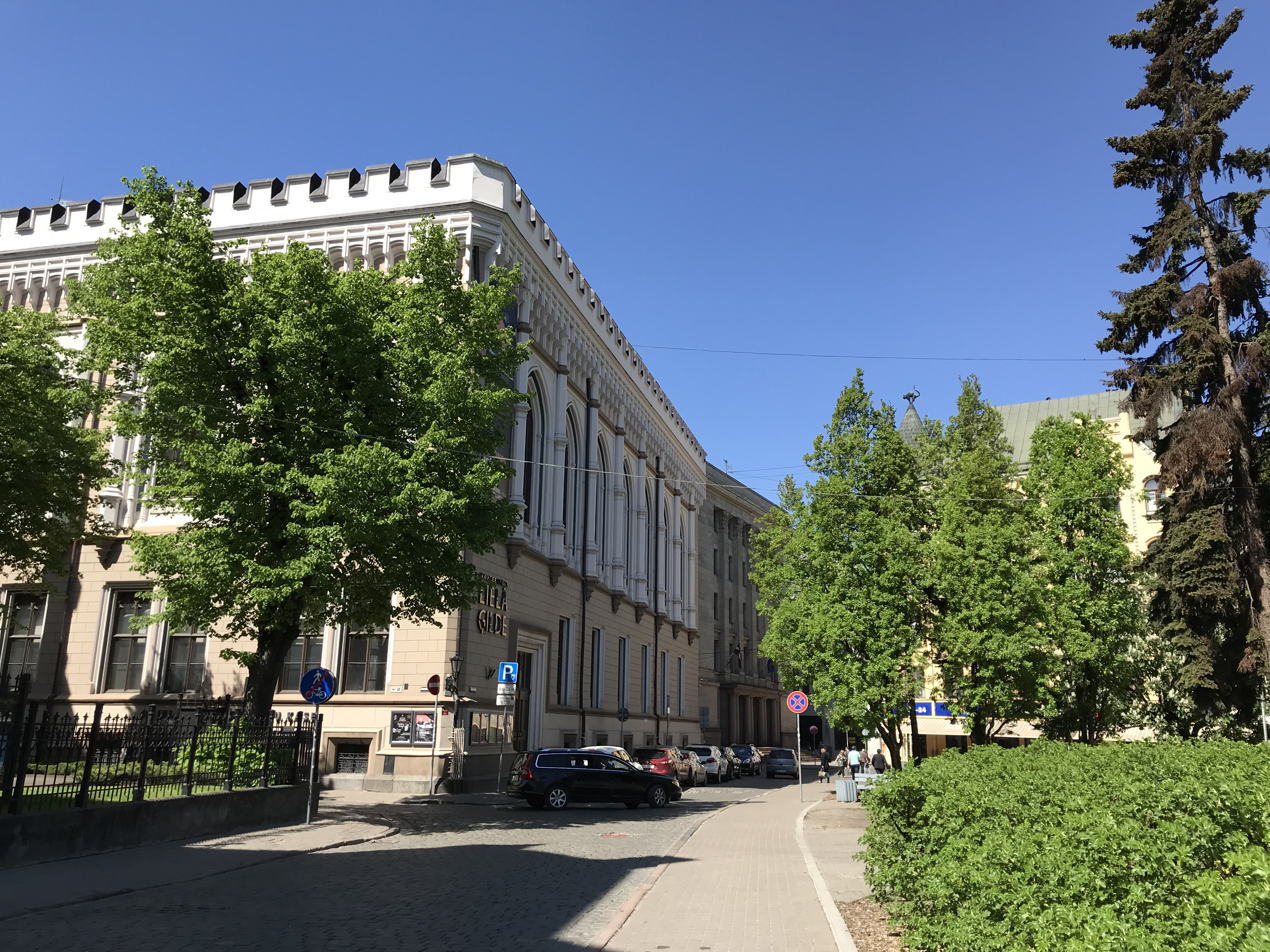
- Livonian Square on 6 Amatu Street

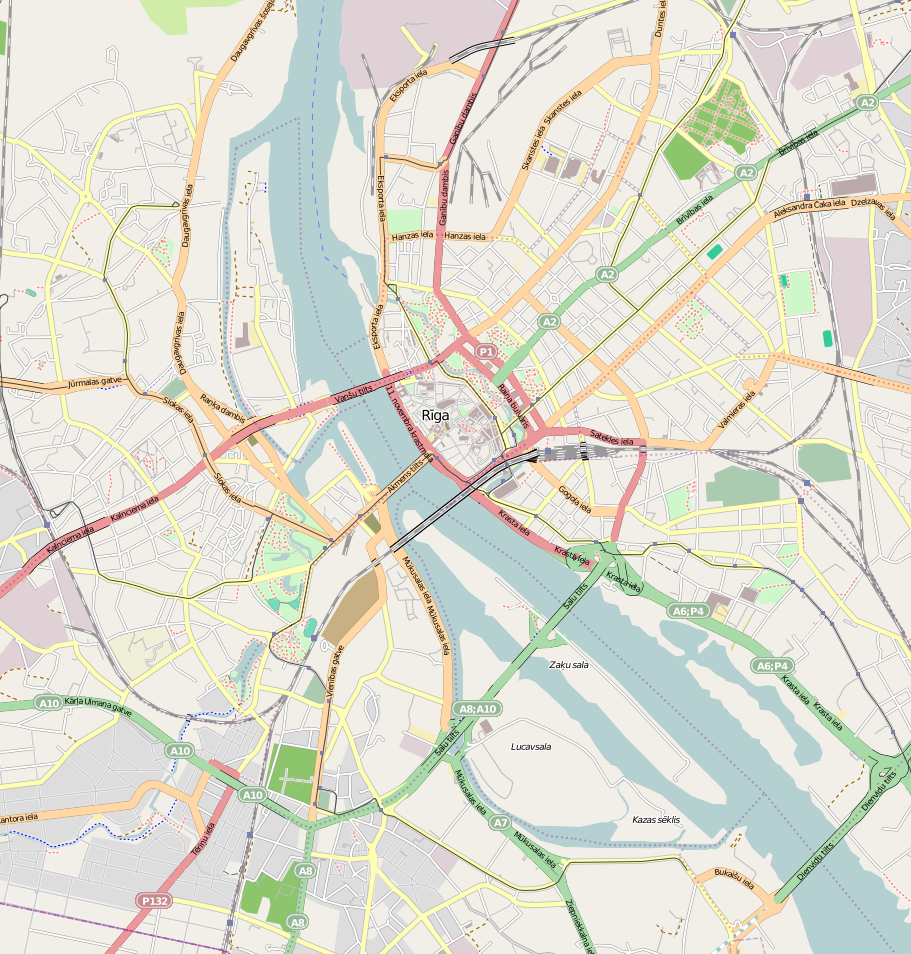
- Location within Riga.

General information
- Architectural style: English eclectic style
- Location: Riga, Latvia
- Coordinates: 56.9498°N 24.1081°E
- Construction started: 1854
- Renovated: 1963–65, 2020–26

Design and construction
- Architects: Karl Beine and Heinrich Scheel

The Large Guild (Latvian: Lielā ģilde, also the Great Guild) is a building in Riga, Latvia. It is located in Old Riga near the Livonian Square (Līvu laukums) on 6 Amatu iela. The Large Guild was built in 1854–1859 in English Gothic style with Gothic forms. It is one of the oldest public buildings in the Baltic states. The building is the Latvian National Symphony Orchestra main concert hall, although currently it is under renovation until late 2026.

== History ==
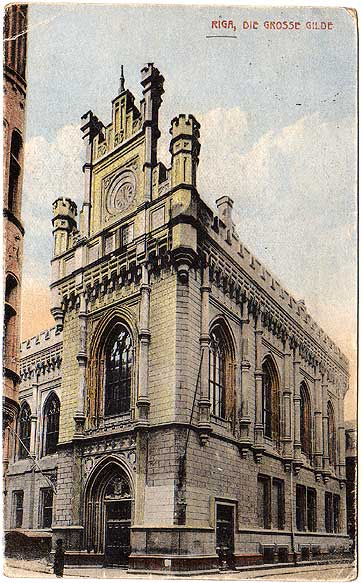
View of the Large Guild from a 1918 vintage picture postcard

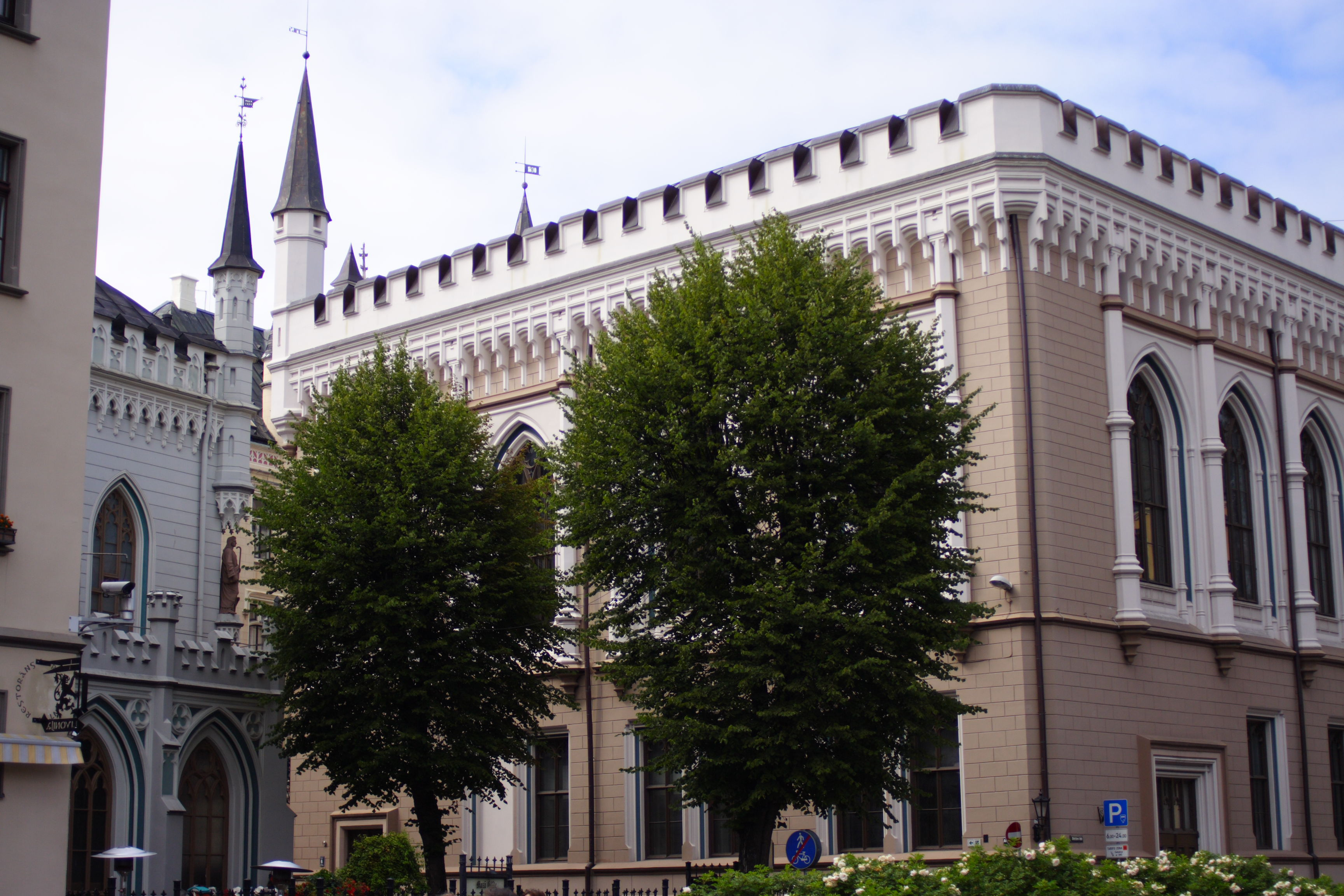
Large Guild today

The Large Guild itself was Riga-based fraternal merchant organization. Its roots begin with Holy Spirit Guild in the 13th century as Riga's first new established fraternal brotherhood. The Guild accepted traders and craftsmen, except for weavers and sauna operators, into its ranks. Later the Holy Spirit guild was split in two parts. According to historical sources, the two parts were named for the two rooms: the Münster (Minsteres) and Soest (Zostes) Rooms. The two room names were brought from Germany by German traders.

Later on, the two guild organizations were split by economic and social interests: the Large Guild brought together Baltic German traders and the Small Guild brought together Baltic German craftsmen. In 1353, in the Münster Room, traders were recognized by statute - this is now considered as the year of the establishment of the Large Guild. Both guilds began also accepting Latvians in their ranks by the 20th century.

The current look of the Large Guild building was designed by architects Karl Beine and Heinrich Scheel between 1853 and 1859. It was rebuilt in the Tudor gothic style. In 1936, the guild began merging with the newly-founded Latvian Chamber of Commerce, and in 1939, the fraternal merchant organization was finally dissolved due to the exodus of the Baltic German community.

During the Soviet occupation of Latvia, the Great Hall was managed by the Concert Hall of the State Philharmonic of the Latvian SSR. The concert hall in the Guild had to be renovated after 1963 because of damage due to a fire in the upper floors. In 1965, the Guild was renovated by architect Modris Ģelzis and the interior was customized for concert hall needs.

A major renovation project was announced in 2020 by its owner, the state-owned SJSC State Real Estate (VNĪ). After the first stage of planning was completed in 2023, the second stage - construction works - began in July 2024. The project is expected to be completed by the end of 2026.

The Large Guild is the official home of the Latvian National Symphony Orchestra, however, due to the ongoing renovation works, the orchestra has been temporarily relocated to the Riga Congress Hall since mid-2024. The rooms of the Guild are also suitable for a wide range of cultural events and conferences. The plans include rebuilding the stage of the Grand Room, spectator seating and the ceiling framework, as well as improving accessibility in the building.

=== Interior ===
The most known Large Guild rooms are the minster room and bride's chamber. The minster room is famous because it is the only room in Latvia who is preserved from the Middle Ages as a secular society building indoor room. The bride's chamber was meant as a Guild gathering place and also was meant for wedding needs.

In 1888 stained glass was installed in the staircase (by master A. Freystadtl), expressing the greatness of united German merchants. The artworks depicted the events of 1353, when the Master of the Order of the city handed over the building to the representatives of the guild.

The current stained glass in the Large Guild depicts the most important business areas of Riga. In 1936, stained glass windows by the Latvian romanticist architect Ansis Cīrulis were installed in the facade. A number of these windows were destroyed in the 1963 fire.
