= Liepāja massacres =

Series of mass executions in Latvia

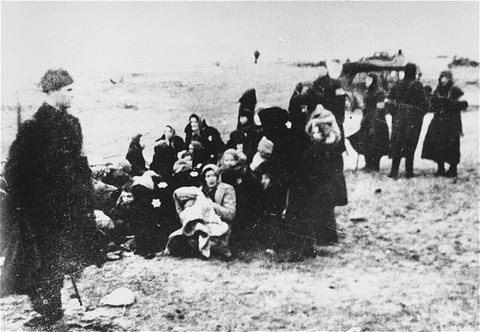
- Members of a Latvian SD police unit assemble a group of Jewish women for murder on a beach near Liepāja, December 15, 1941.

- Location within Latvia
- Also known as: Libau, Šķēde, Shkeede, Skeden
- Location: Liepāja and vicinity, including Priekule, Aizpute, and Grobiņa, Latvia; 56°28′58″N 21°00′35″E
- Incident type: Imprisonment, mass shootings, forced labor
- Perpetrators: Viktors Arājs, Pēteris Galiņš, Fritz Dietrich, Erhard Grauel, Wolfgang Kügler, Hans Kawelmacher, Karl-Emil Strott
- Organizations: Einsatzgruppen, Ordnungspolizei, Arajs Kommando, Latvian Auxiliary Police, Heer, Kriegsmarine
- Victims: About 5,000 Jews. Lesser numbers of Roma, communists and the mentally ill were also killed.
- Memorials: At Šķēde, Liepāja Central Cemetery

The Liepāja massacres were a series of mass executions, many public or semi-public, in and near the city of Liepāja (German: Libau), on the west coast of Latvia in 1941 after the German occupation of Latvia. The main perpetrators were detachments of the Einsatzgruppen, the Sicherheitsdienst (SD), the Ordnungspolizei (ORPO), and Latvian auxiliary police and militia forces. Heer soldiers and German naval personnel were present during shootings. In addition to Jewish men, women and children (c. 5,000), the Germans and their Latvian collaborators also killed Roma (c.100), communists, the mentally ill (c. 30) and so-called "hostages". In contrast to most other Holocaust murders in Latvia, the killings at Liepāja were done in open places. About 5,000 of the 5,700 Jews trapped in Liepāja were shot, most of them in 1941. The killings occurred at a variety of places within and outside of the city, including Rainis Park in the city center, and areas near the harbor, the Olympic Stadium, and the lighthouse. The largest massacre, of 2,731 Jews and 23 communists, occurred in the dunes surrounding the town of Šķēde, north of the city center. This massacre, which was perpetrated on a disused Latvian Army training ground, was conducted by German and collaborator forces from December 15 to 17, 1941. More is known about the killing of the Jews of Liepāja than in any other city in Latvia except for Riga.

== German invasion ==
Liepāja was targeted by the Germans as a town of special importance. It was a naval base and also an important international port. As such, the population was suspected of being more sympathetic to Communism. The German army planned to capture the city on the first day of the war, Sunday, June 22, 1941. The attack on Liepāja was led by the German 291st Infantry Division. Strong resistance by the Red Army and other Soviet forces prevented the Germans from entering the city until June 29, 1941, and resistance, including sniper fire, continued within the city for several days afterwards. The city was heavily damaged in the fighting and fires burned for days.

== Shootings begin ==
In Latvia the Holocaust started on the night of June 23 to June 24, 1941, when in Grobiņa, a town near Liepāja, Sonderkommando 1a members killed six local Jews, including the town chemist, in the church graveyard. Once Liepāja itself fell on June 29, 1941, "the hunt for the Jews began with the first hours of occupation." Ezergailis estimates that about 5,700 Jews of Liepāja and the surrounding district fell into German hands.

On June 29 and June 30, 1941, there were random shootings of Jews in Liepāja by German soldiers. About 100 Jews (plus or minus 30) were killed in these shootings. Shootings began almost immediately. For example, at 5:00 p.m. on June 29, arriving German soldiers seized 7 Jews and 22 Latvians and shot them at a bomb crater in the middle of Ulicha street. At 9:00 p.m. the same day German soldiers came to Hika street, where they assembled all the residents and asked if any were refugees from Germany. One man, Walter Hahn, a conductor who had fled Vienna in 1938, stepped forward and was immediately shot. (Another source says that Hahn was killed by a mob of Latvians fomented by Nazis.) The next day, June 30, soldiers went to the City Hospital, arrested several Jewish physicians and patients, disregarded the protests of the Latvian hospital staff, and shot them. Among the victims was 10-year-old Masha Blumenau.

== Rainis Park massacre ==
On June 29, 1941, a detachment of Einsatzkommando 1a, (EK 1a) under SS-Obersturmbannführer Reichert entered Liepāja. One of the first people EK 1a killed, on June 30, was the musician Aron Fränkel, who, not knowing that Einsatzkommando had set up headquarters at his place of employment, the Hotel St. Petersburg, showed up for work. He was identified as a Jew and immediately shot.

During the fighting, the Soviet forces had dug defensive trenches in Rainis Park (Raiņa parks) in the center of Liepāja. On July 3 and 4, 1941, in their first documented massacre in Liepāja, Reichert's EK 1a men, all Germans of the SD, rounded up Jews and marched them to these trenches in the park. Once at the trench, they were shot and the bodies pushed in. How many were killed during these shootings is not known. Estimates range from several dozen to 300. After the war, the Soviet Union investigatory commission concluded that 1,430 people were killed in the park shootings, which Ezergailis characterizes as an exaggeration. One participant, Harry Fredrichson, later testified that in one massacre he participated in, 150 people were killed.

== Anti-Jewish measures ==
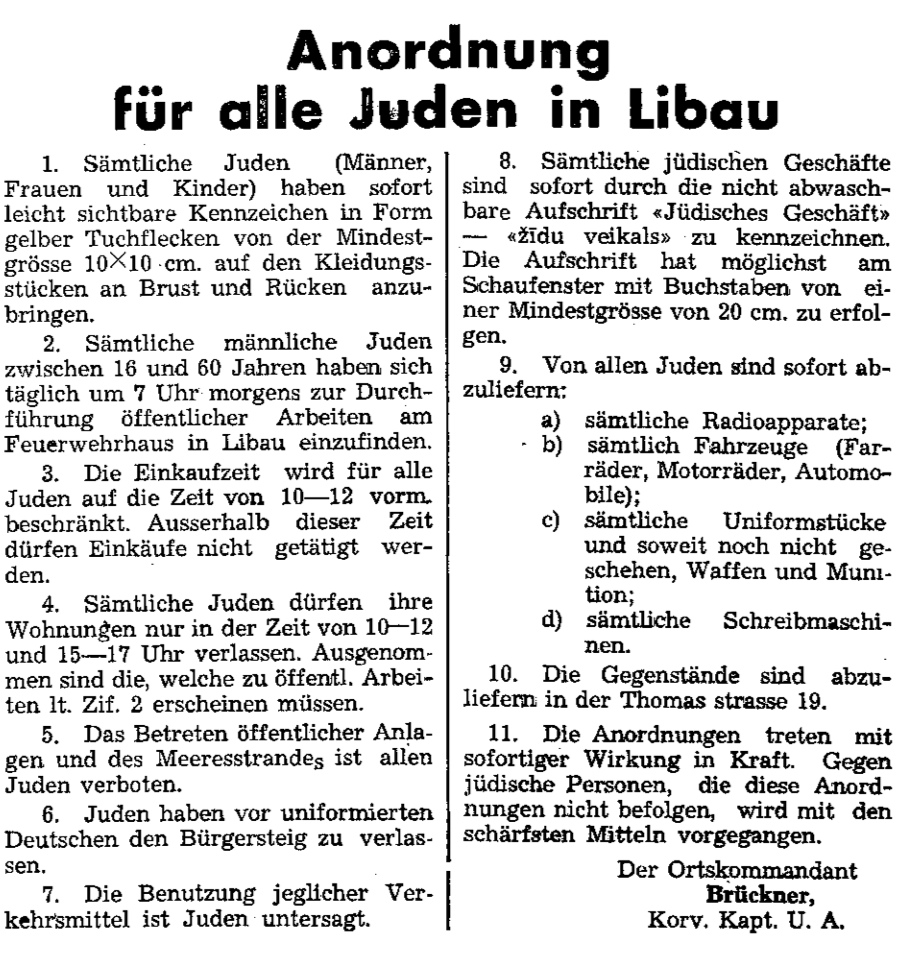
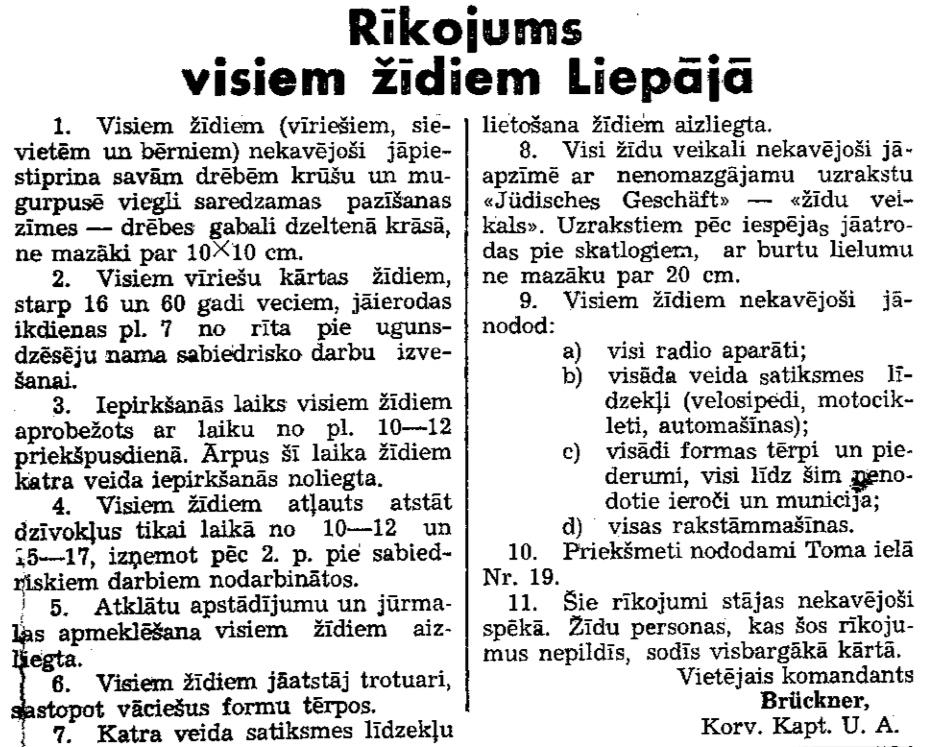
Anti-Jewish measures ordered by the German naval commander in Liepāja, July 5, 1941, in German and Latvian.

As a naval base, Liepāja came under the command of the German navy, the Kriegsmarine. Lieutenant commander (Korvettenkapitan) Stein was appointed town commandant. On July 1, 1941, Stein ordered ten hostages shot for every act of sabotage, and further made targets of civilians by declaring that Red Army soldiers were hiding among them in civilian attire. This was the first announcement in Latvia of a threat to shoot hostages. On July 5, 1941 Korvettenkapitan Brückner, who had taken over from Stein issued a set of anti-Jewish regulations. These were published in a local newspaper, Kurzemes Vārds. Summarized these were as follows:

- All Jews must wear the yellow star on the front and back of their clothing;
- Shopping hours for Jews were restricted to 10:00 a.m. to 12:00 noon. Jews were only allowed out of their residences for these hours and from 3:00 p.m. to 5:00 p.m.
- Jews were barred from public events and transportation and were not to walk on the beach.
- Jews were required to leave the sidewalk if they encountered a German in uniform.
- Jewish shops were required to display the sign "A Jewish-owned business" in the window.
- Jews were to surrender all radios, typewriters, uniforms, arms and means of transportation.

== July 7 "hostage" shootings ==
On July 3 or 4, Erhard Grauel, commander of a detachment of Einsatzkommando 2, entered the city with about 30 men, most of them from Police Battalion 9 of the Ordnungspolizei. Reichert was then engaged in the Rainis Park shootings, which he described to Grauel as a "special assignment." Reichert left the day after Grauel arrived. Grauel took over the Women's Prison and used it as a detention facility for the targets of the Nazi regime. Mostly they were Jews, but Communists and communist-sympathizers were also arrested. Rumors spread that the Jews were responsible for the Communist atrocities during the Soviet regime in Liepāja. Latvian militia ("self-defense men") carried out most if not all of the arrests. On July 6, 1941, Werner Hartman, a German war correspondent, saw the Women's Prison crammed so full of prisoners that there was no room for them to lie down.

The first shootings carried out by Grauel were of about 30 Jews and Communists, arrested July 5 through July 7 and executed on July 7, 1941, as "hostages" pursuant to Korvettenkapitan Stein's decree of July 1, supposedly in retaliation for shots having been fired at German patrols in the Liepāja vicinity. Grauel had selected every fifth prisoner for execution, and Grauel's men shot them on the beach in the dunes near the lighthouse. The numbers killed in the hostage massacre were stated as 30 in Grauel's postwar trial, and estimated at 27 plus or minus 16 by Anders and Dubrovskis.

== July 8–10 shootings ==
On or about July 7, 1941, Reichert returned to Liepāja, with a message from Franz Walter Stahlecker, commander of Einsatzgruppe A, that accused Grauel of not executing people fast enough. Grauel showed Reichert the list of people he had arrested. Reichert checked off a number of names on the list and demanded that they be shot immediately. Grauel ordered his assistant, one Neuman, to organize an execution. On July 8, 9, and 10, Grauel's men shot 100 men, almost entirely Jews, on each day. They were transported to the execution site from the Women's Prison in groups of 20.

According to Hartman's later testimony, on July 8, he was present at the killing site from 11:00 a.m. to 5:00 p.m., and saw about 200 people killed. The procedure was for the Latvian "freedom fighters" (as they were called by Hartman) to drive the victims ten at a time into a long ditch that ended in a pit. There they would be aligned in a double row, and shot, generally by Germans, but possibly by Latvians. The area around the execution site was guarded by Germans and Latvians, the latter distinguishable by their red-white-red armbands.

The early executions, which happened at least every two weeks, if not more often, were on the beach to the south of the lighthouse. The initial execution squads were Germans, but were later replaced by a commando of Latvians.

Grauel later testified at his post-war trial that he had requested to be relieved from command because of the stress of the massacres of July 8 to July 10. His request was granted by the Einsatzkommando 2 commander, Rudolf Batz, and by the end of October, Grauel returned to Germany to study jurisprudence. Historian Ezergailis noted however, that before returning to Germany, and despite his claim to have been shocked by the July 8–10 massacres, Grauel went on from Liepāja to the nearby town of Ventspils, where he organized additional killings.

== July 24–25: First Arājs action ==
22 July 1941: "... Here about 8,000 Jews ... with present SS personnel this would take about 1 year, which is untenable for pacification of Libau."
27 July 1941: "Jewish problem Libau largely solved by execution of about 1,100 male Jews by Riga SS commando on 24 and 25.7."

— Hans Kawelmacher, Libau naval commandant.

Grauel was replaced with SS-Untersturmführer (equivalent to a second lieutenant) Wolfgang Kügler on July 10 or 11. Under Kügler's supervision, massacres occurred at a rate of about twice a week. Shootings of small groups of Jews continued after July 10, happening every evening. These were organized by Kügler. Often these were of less than 10 individuals, which was a pattern particular to Kügler's administration in Liepāja. The exact number of those killed in these actions is not known, but was estimated by Anders and Dubrovskis to be 81 individuals plus or minus 27. Anders and Dubrovskis estimate the total number of victims to be 387 individuals, plus or minus 130. Otto Fischer, Jewish football coach and former Austrian national team player, was killed in the massacres in July.

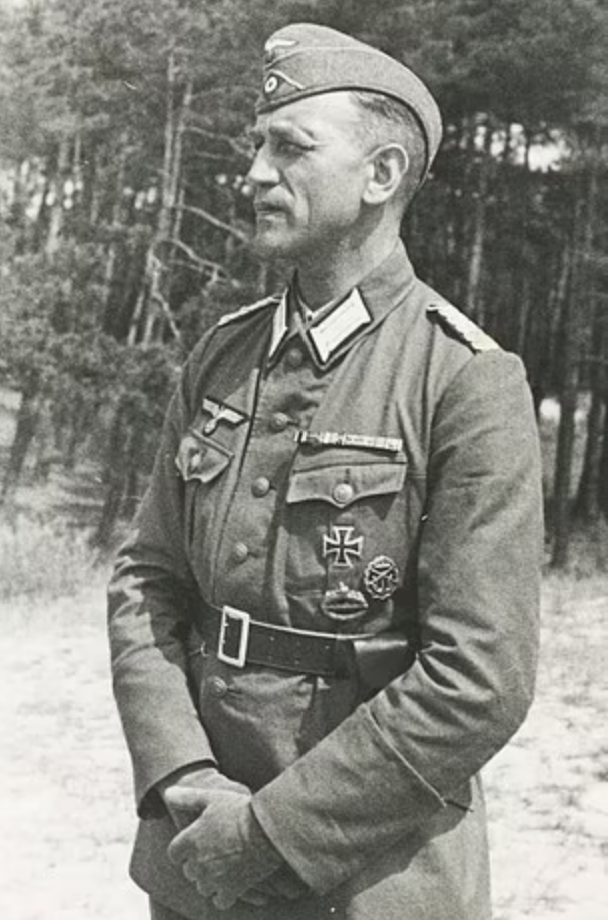
Hans Kawelmacher (1940)

On July 16, 1941, Fregattenkapitän Hans Kawelmacher was appointed the German naval commandant in Liepāja. On July 22, Kawelmacher sent a telegram to the German Navy's Baltic Command in Kiel, which stated that he wanted 100 SS and fifty Schutzpolizei ("protective police") men sent to Liepāja for "quick implementation Jewish problem". By "quick implementation" Kawelmacher meant "accelerated killing." Mass arrests of Jewish men began immediately in Liepāja, and continued through July 25, 1941. The Arājs Kommando was brought in from Riga to carry out the shootings, which occurred on July 24 and July 25. About 910 Jewish men were executed, plus or minus 90. Statements in other sources that 3,000 (Vesterman) and 3,500 (Soviet Extraordinary Commission) were killed are incorrect.

This first Arājs action was later described by Georg Rosenstock, the commander of the second company of the 13th Police Reserve battalion. Rosenstock testified after the war that when he and his unit had arrived in Liepāja in July, 1941, they had heard from some passing marines that Jews were being continuously executed in the town, and these marines were going out to watch the executions. A few days later, on Saturday, July 24, 1941, Rosenstock saw Jews (whom he identified by the yellow stars on their clothing) crouching down in the back of a truck, being guarded by armed Latvians. Rosenstock, who was himself in a vehicle, followed the truck to the north of the city to the beach near the naval base, where he saw Kügler, some SD men, and a number of Jews. After the war, Rosenstock stated:

The Jews were crouching down on the ground. They had to walk in groups of about ten to the edge of a pit. Here they were shot by Latvian civilians. The execution area was visited by scores of German spectators from the Navy and the Reichsbahn [national railway]. I turned to Kügler and said in no uncertain terms that it was intolerable that shootings were being carried out in front of spectators.

== Shootings from August to December 10 ==
The killings continued at August after the first Arājs action, but on a lessened scale. From August 30 to December 10, 1941, there were a large number of shootings, in which about 600 Jews, 100 communists, and 100 Roma were killed. Anders and Dubrovskis estimate the total victims through August 15, 1941 as 153 plus or minus 68. Schulz, a boatswain's mate ("Oberbootsmaat") from the harbor surveillance command, testified that on a day August, 1941, he had heard continuous rifle salvoes all day coming from across the harbor from his position.

Between 5:00 p.m. and 6:00 p.m. Schulz and another man rowed across the harbor to see what was happening. They followed the sounds of the shooting until they came to the old citadel. By standing on a bunker at the citadel they could see a long deep trench which was said to have been dug by the Jews the previous day. This was about one kilometer north of the lighthouse. They watched for about an hour or an hour and a half. During that time, three or four trucks arrived at the site, each carrying five Jews. They were forced to lie down in the truck. When the truck reached the site, the driver took the vehicle right up to the trench. Latvian guards, wielding clubs, forced the victims to enter directly into the trench. A squad of five men, possibly Latvians, but more probably German SD men, then shot them in the head. The supervising SS or SD officer then shot again any one not immediately killed.

== Massacres of the Roma ==
The Romani people (also known as "Gypsy" in English and "Zigeuner" in German) were also targets of the Nazi occupation. On December 4, 1941, Hinrich Lohse issued a decree which stated:

Gypsies who wander about in the countryside represent a two-fold danger.

1. As carriers of contagious diseases, especially typhus; 2. As unreliable elements who neither obey the regulations issued by German authorities, nor are willing to do useful work.

There exists well-founded suspicion that they provide intelligence to the enemy and thus damage the German cause. I therefore order that they are to be treated as Jews.

Roma were also forbidden to live along the coast, which included Liepāja. On December 5, 1941, the Latvian police in Liepāja arrested 103 Roma (24 men, 31 women, and 48 children). Of these people, the Latvian police turned over 100 to the custody of the German police chief Fritz Dietrich "for follow up" ("zu weiteren Veranlassung"), a Nazi euphemism for murder. On December 5, 1941, all 100 were killed near Frauenburg.

By May 18, 1942, the German police and SS commander in Liepāja indicated in a log that over a previous unspecified period, 174 Roma had been killed by shooting. The German policy on Roma varied. In general, it seemed that wandering or "itinerant" Roma ("vagabundierende Zigeuner") were targeted, as opposed to the non-wandering, or "sedentary" population. Thus, on May 21, 1942, the SS commander in Liepāja police and SS commander recorded the execution of 16 itinerant Roma from the Hasenputh district. The documentation however does not always distinguish between different Roma groups, thus on April 24, 1942, EK A reported having killed 1,272 people, including 71 Roma, with no further description.

== December 15–17: "The Big Action" ==
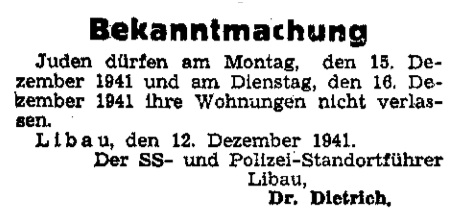
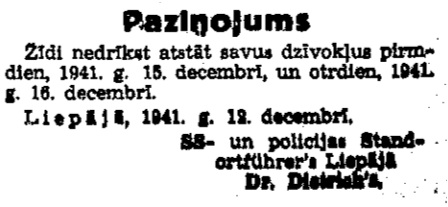
Nazi police warning to the Jews of Liepāja to remain in their houses on December 15 and 16, 1941, in German and Latvian languages.

The largest of the Liepāja massacres took place on three days from Monday, December 15 to Wednesday, December 17, 1941. On December 13, Kurzemes Vārds published an order by Emil Diedrich, the Nazi police in Liepāja, which required all Jews in the city to remain in their residences on Monday, December 15 and December 16, 1941. The order came from SD headquarters in Riga; whether it was received by Kügler or his deputy, Reichle, was disputed, with both Kügler and Reichle later claiming Kügler was on leave in Germany. The Latvian police began arresting the Jews in the city on the night of December 13 to 14, bringing them to the Women's Prison, where they were confined in the courtyard. There was not enough room for the people, so they were ordered to stand facing towards the wall, and not move, look for relatives, or look at the guards, who beat people and treated them with brutality. There was an old wooden building, a garage, barn, or horse barn, at the beach at Šķēde. Some of the Jews were taken to this building on the evening of Sunday, December 14.

Pēteris Galiņš, of whom little is known other than that he was killed in Russia in winter 1943, was in charge of the Latvian guards, and he ordered a team of 20 to report for duty at 5:30 a.m. on December 15.

The execution site was on the beach, north of the city, and north of the small barn or garage, which was used as a temporary holding point for the victims while their turn came to be executed. A trench had been dug in the dunes that ran parallel to the shore and was about 100 meters long and 3 meters wide. Columns of Jews were formed at the Women's Prison and marched out under guard to the killing site. The guards were Latvians with Germans acting as supervisors.

Once at the site, the Jews were housed in the barn and taken in groups of 20 of a time to a point 40 or 50 meters from the trench, where they were ordered to lie face down on the ground. Groups of ten were then ordered to stand up, and, except for children, remove their outer clothing. As they were moved closer to the pit, they were ordered to strip completely. A Latvian guard, Bulvāns, later testified that he saw two Germans, SS-Scharführer ("squad leader") Karl-Emil Strott and Philip (or Filip) Krapp, using a whip on people who did not move on to the pit.

The actual shootings were done by three units, one of Germans, another of Latvian SD men, and another unit of the Latvian police, apparently the one commanded by Galiņš. The victims were positioned along the edge of the sea side of the trench. They were faced away from their killers, who fired across the trench, with two gunmen allocated to each victim. After the initial volley, a German SD man would step down into trench, inspect the bodies, and fire finishing shots into anyone left alive. The goal was to have the bodies fall into the trench, but this did not always happen. Accordingly, the executioners had a "kicker" come along after each group of victims. The kicker's job was to literally kick, roll, or shove the bodies into the grave. Sergeant Jauģietis of the Latvia police worked as a kicker for at least part of the killings. Each execution team was relieved by another after killing 10 sets of victims.

It was the practice of the persons commanding the executioners in Latvia to encourage drinking among at least the Latvian killing squads. During the Liepāja killings, a milk can of rum was set up at the killing pits. High-ranking Heer and Kriegsmarine officers visited the site during the course of the executions.

Lucan, an adjutant of the 707th Marine Antiaircraft Detachment, described seeing an execution of 300 to 500 Liepāja Jews in the winter. He saw a column of 300 to 500 Jews of all ages, men and women, being led under guard past his unit's headquarter's north on the road to Ventspils. The trench was 50 to 75 meters long, 2 to 3 meters wide and about 3 meters deep. Lucan did not see the actual shooting, but he and other members of his unit heard rifle fire coming from the direction of the pit for a long time. Lucan inspected the site the next day:

The following day I went with several members of our unit ... to the execution area on horseback. When we arrived at the said hills we could see the arms and legs of the executed Jews sticking out of the inadequately filled-in grave. After seeing this, we officers sent a written communication to our headquarters in Liepāja. As a result of our communication the dead Jews were covered properly with sand.

After the shootings, on January 3, 1942, Kügler reported to Fritz Dietrich, then in command of the Riga Order Police (German: Ordnungspolizei), that the executions were well known to the local population and had not been well-received:

Regret about the fate of the Jews is constantly expressed; there are few voices to be heard which are in favor of the elimination of the Jews. Among other things, a rumor is abroad that the execution was filmed in order to have material to use against the Latvian Schutzmannschaft. This material is said to prove that Latvians and not Germans carried out the executions.

== Spectators, participants, and photography ==
Many of the Liepāja executions were witnessed by persons other than the participants. Klee, Dressen, and Riess, in their study of the Holocaust perpetrators, concluded that the public executions were "in many ways a festival", that German soldiers traveled long distances to get the best places to witness the mass shootings, and that these public executions continued over a long period of time and became a form of "execution tourism". Nobody was forced to murder Jews, and there were people who refused to do so. Nothing bad happened to them and in particular no one who refused was ever sent to a concentration camp. At most, those who refused orders to kill were abused as "cowards" by their commanders. This pattern was followed in Liepāja. For example, a boatman who worked under the harbormaster, Navy personnel and at least one hundred Heer soldiers were present at an execution, apparently pursuant to orders.

Reinhard Wiener, on leave from his position as a German naval sergeant, went to the July or August massacres and filmed one of them with his 8 mm camera. He found "German soldiers standing as spectators all around". This film - the only known surviving film footage of Einsatzgruppen mass executions - has survived and is today known as Liepaja Executions Film. It is one of the most frequently cited audiovisual records in Holocaust documentaries. The December shootings at Šķēde were photographed by SS-Scharführer Karl-Emil Strott. These became the best known images of the murders of Jews in Latvia, and they show only Latvians. The photographs were found by David Zivcon, who worked as an electrician at the SD office in Liepāja. He found four rolls of film when he was repairing wiring in a German's apartment. Zivcon stole the film, had prints made, and returned the originals before they were missed. He then placed the prints in a metal box and buried them. After the Germans were driven out of Latvia, Zivcon retrieved the prints, which were later used in war crimes trials and displayed in museums around the world. Historian Ezergailis states that it was Kügler himself who photographed the shootings, but of course if Kügler had been on leave, he could not have taken the photographs. Following the December shootings, the executioners repeatedly returned to the beach at Šķēde for killings, extending the trench along the dunes until it reportedly reached a length of one kilometer. In 1943, the grave was opened and chlorine cast over the bodies.

Philippe Labrune saw a photograph in the Jewish Museum in Riga of 4 women and a girl and began an investigation to out who the girl was. He discovered that she was Sorella Epstein and a French documentary was made on the investigation. It was broadcast in France in 2015.

=== Photographs of the December shootings ===
A group of Jewish women huddled together, waiting to be shot on the beach

Women and children forced to undress prior to shooting

A Latvian guard leads Jewish women to the execution site

Jewish women about to be shot by Nazis

Immediately following the shooting. The man on the right is the "kicker", responsible for shoving the bodies into the pit.

== The Liepāja ghetto ==
In June 1942, when the Liepāja ghetto was established, there were only about 814 surviving Jews. The ghetto itself consisted of only 11 houses on four streets. Until the ghetto was closed in October 1943, the inhabitants were used as a pool of forced labor for the occupying authorities. During that time 102 people died and 54 were executed. The ghetto guards were Latvians wearing black uniforms. Conditions were harsh and food was short. On October 8, 1943, Yom Kippur, the survivors of the Liepāja ghetto were loaded into cattle cars and shipped to Riga and the ghetto was closed. Only three Jews, who were barely alive, were left behind, two shoemakers and one goldsmith.

== Justice ==
- 351 members of the Arajs Kommando were prosecuted by the Soviets, with 30 of them being executed.
- Viktors Arājs evaded justice for many years, but in 1979 he was convicted in a West German court and sentenced to life in prison, where he died in 1988.
- Fritz Dietrich was tried and convicted by the US military not for his crimes in Latvia, for which his role was not known at the time, but for ordering the executions of seven American airmen who had surrendered in Germany. He was sentenced to death and executed at Landsberg Prison in 1948.
- Franz Stahlecker was fatally wounded in action by Russian partisans on 22 March 1942. He died the next day.
- Wolfgang Kügler in a post war crimes trial in West Germany and sentenced to 8 months in prison and a fine. After being re-arrested in 1959, he killed himself in prison.
- In 1969, Hans Baumgartner, a member of Einsatzkommando 2 who participated in the shootings, was arrested in East Germany. In March 1971, he was found guilty of participating in the deportations of at least 3000 people and the shootings of nearly 6330 Jews, other civilians, and POWs, in Latvia, including in Liepāja, and sentenced to death. Baumgartner, 60, was executed by shooting at Leipzig Prison on 16 September 1971.
- In 1971, a court in West Germany (Hannover Landgericht) convicted a number of the SD and Ordnungspolizei participants in the Liepāja massacres. The primary source of information about the Liepāja killings is the record developed in these proceedings. The court imposed the following prison sentences:

Paul Fahrbach: 1.5 years
Erhard Grauel: 7 years
Gerhard Kuketta: 2 years
Otto Reiche: 5 years
Georg Rosenstock: 2.5 years
Karl-Emil Strott: 7 years
Erich Handke: 8 years (died in prison 8 months later)

== Tabular summary ==
1941–1942 massacres Liepāja
Date	Location	Name	Commander	Participants	Units	Method	No. victims	Type
4 Jul 41	Liepāja	Rainis Park	Reichert	Frederichson	EK 2	shooting	200-300	Jews
7 Jul 41	lighthouse		Grauel			shooting	30	hostages
8-10 Jul 41	Liepāja		Grauel			shooting	300?	
24-25 Jul 41		First Arājs action	Kügler	Arājs		shooting	910	Jews
End Jul 41		Ulleweit Action	Kügler			shooting	15	Jews
22 Sep 41	Liepāja		Kügler			shooting	61	Jews
24 Sep 41	Liepāja		Kügler			shooting	61	Jews
25 Sep 41	Liepāja		Kügler			shooting	123	Jews
26 Sep 41			Kügler			shooting	80	Jews and communists
30 Sep 41			Kügler			shooting	21?	Jews
unknown	Courland		Kügler			shooting	15-20	Mentally ill
unknown	Courland		Kügler			shooting	20	Jews
3 Oct 41	Liepāja		Kügler			shooting	37	Jews
4 Oct 41	Liepāja		Kügler			shooting	20	18 Jews and 2 communists
8 Oct 41	Liepāja		Kügler			shooting	36	Jews
11 Oct 41	Liepāja	Aktion Brückenwache	Kügler			shooting	67	Jews
about Oct 41	Šķēde		Kügler			shooting	200	Jews
Oct 41			Kügler			shooting	25	Jews
Oct 41			Kügler			shooting	50-80	Jews
Oct 41	Liepāja		Kügler			shooting	groups	Communists
Oct 41	Šķēde	Aktion Linharts	Kügler			shooting	33	30 men, 3 women
late Oct 41			Kügler			shooting	80	Men, women, children
late Oct 41	Priekule		Kügler			shooting	20	Jews
3 Nov 41	Aizpute					shooting	386	Jews
6 Nov 41	Liepāja					shooting	5	2 Jews and 3 communists
10 Nov 41	Liepāja					shooting	56	30 Jews and 26 communists
Beginning of Dec 41	Šķēde					shooting	100	Roma
15-17 Dec 41	Šķēde					shooting	2,749	Jews (men, women and children)
15 Dec 41	Liepāja (by military harbor)					shooting	270	Jews
Dec 41						shooting		mentally ill
15 Feb 42	Šķēde					shooting		Jews
beginning of March 42	Šķēde					shooting	about 20	Communists
April 42	Šķēde					shooting	15-20	men
Late Mar 42						shooting	20	Latvians
summer 42	Šķēde					shooting		

== Memorials ==
At Šķēde and Liepāja Central Cemetery.

== See also ==
- List of massacres in Latvia
