= Paul Mandelstamm =

Baltic German-Jewish architect

- Born: Fayvush Mandelstamm; 19 September [O.S. 7] 1872; Zhagory, Kovno Governorate, Russian Empire (present-day Žagarė, Joniškis District Municipality, Lithuania)
- Died: 1941 (aged 68-69); Riga, Reichskommissariat Ostland, Nazi Germany
- Known for: Architecture
- Movement: Art Nouveau, Functionalism

Paul Mandelstamm (Latvian: Pauls Mandelštams; 19 September [O.S. 7] 1872 – 1941) was a Baltic German-Jewish architect, working mainly in present-day Latvia.

== Biography ==
Paul Mandelstamm was born in Kovno Governorate in present-day Lithuania (then part of the Russian Empire). He studied both architecture and civil engineering at Riga Polytechnic Institute (today Riga Technical University) and graduated in 1892. He worked on the construction of the first electric tram line in Riga in 1900–1901, and supervised the construction of waterworks in the city in 1903–1904. He furthermore designed more than 50 buildings in the city, from the beginning in an Eclectic style, but later in Art Nouveau and later still in a Functionalist style.

He was a victim of Holocaust and was shot in the Riga Central Prison in 1941, during the German occupation of Latvia during World War II.

== Examples of buildings by Paul Mandelstamm ==
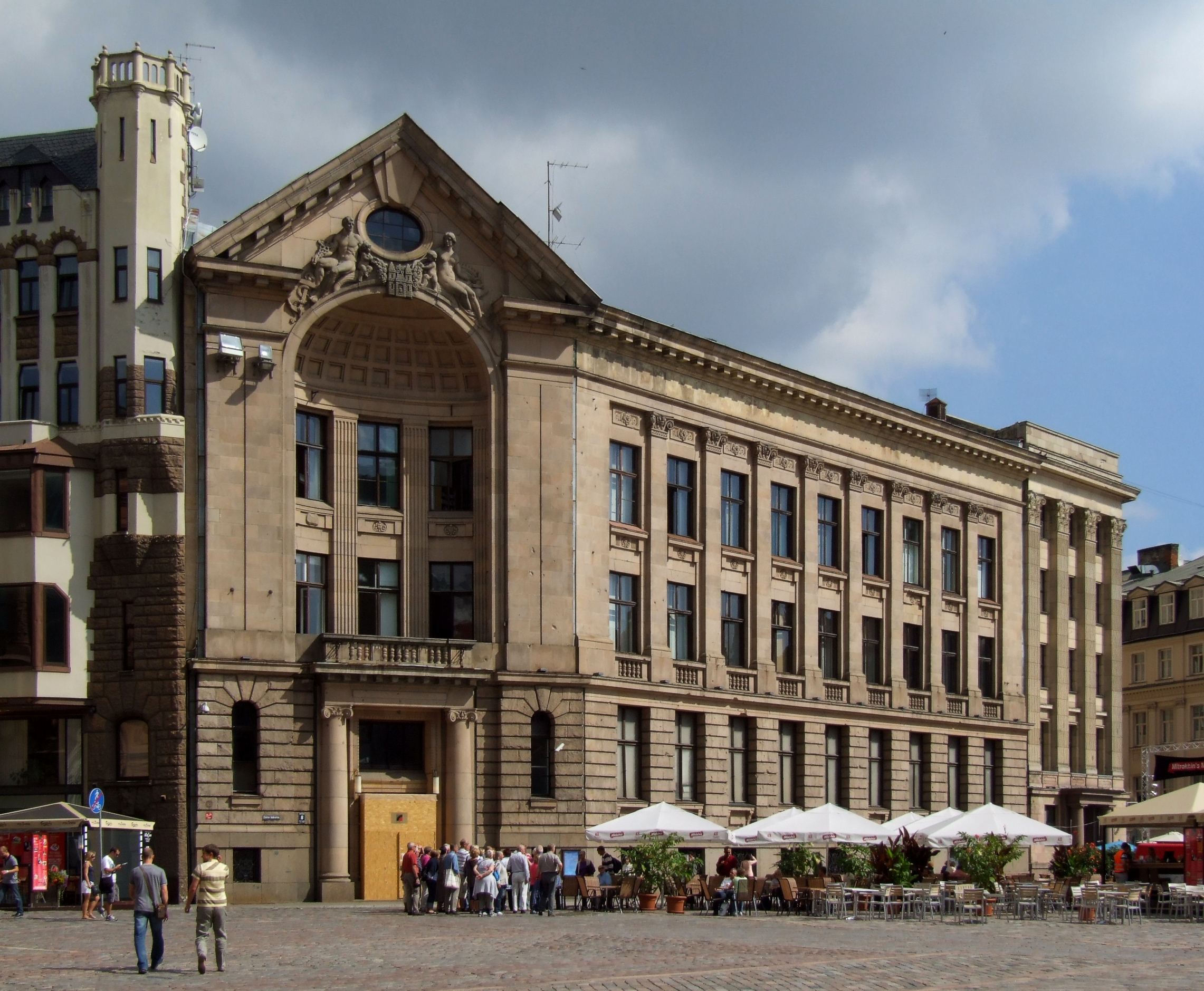
Former bank building by Paul Mandelstamm on Dome Square. Now Latvian Radio. (1913)

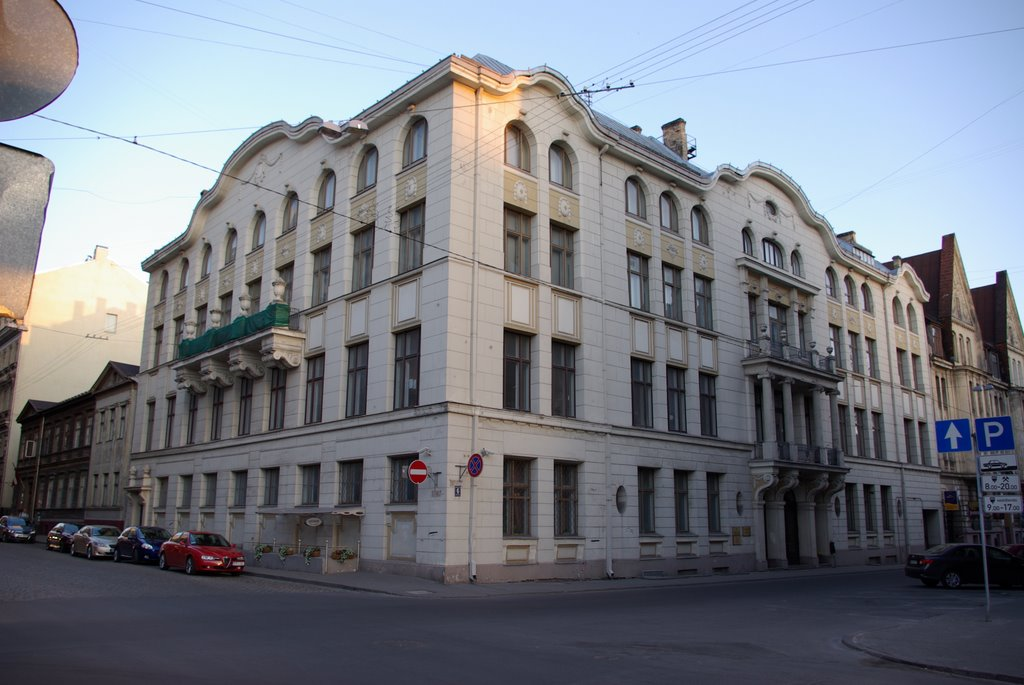
Building by Paul Mandelstamm (together with Edmund von Trompowsky) on Skolas iela 6, today the museum about Jews in Latvia

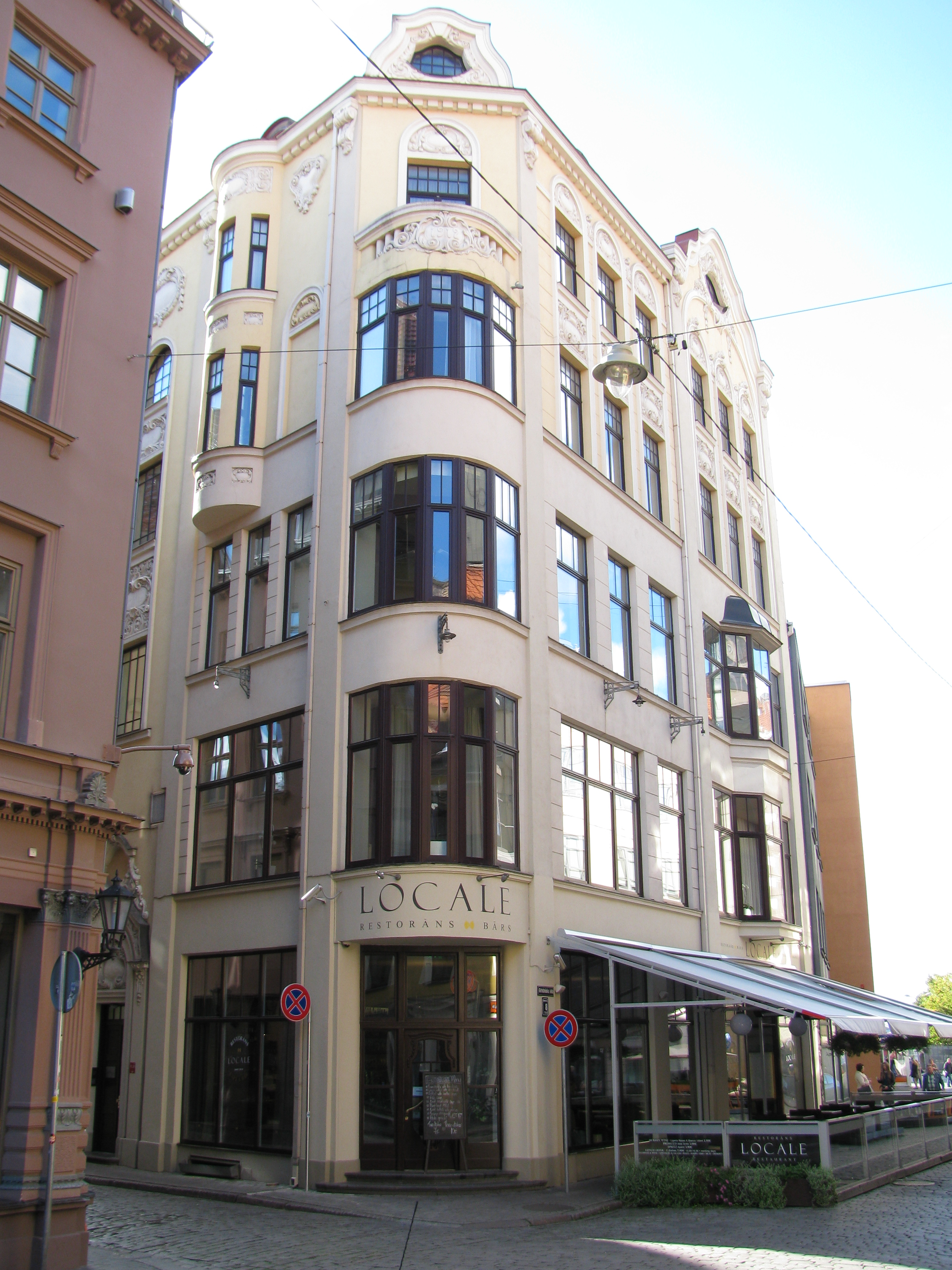
Building by Paul Mandelstamm on Grēcinieku iela 8, Riga.

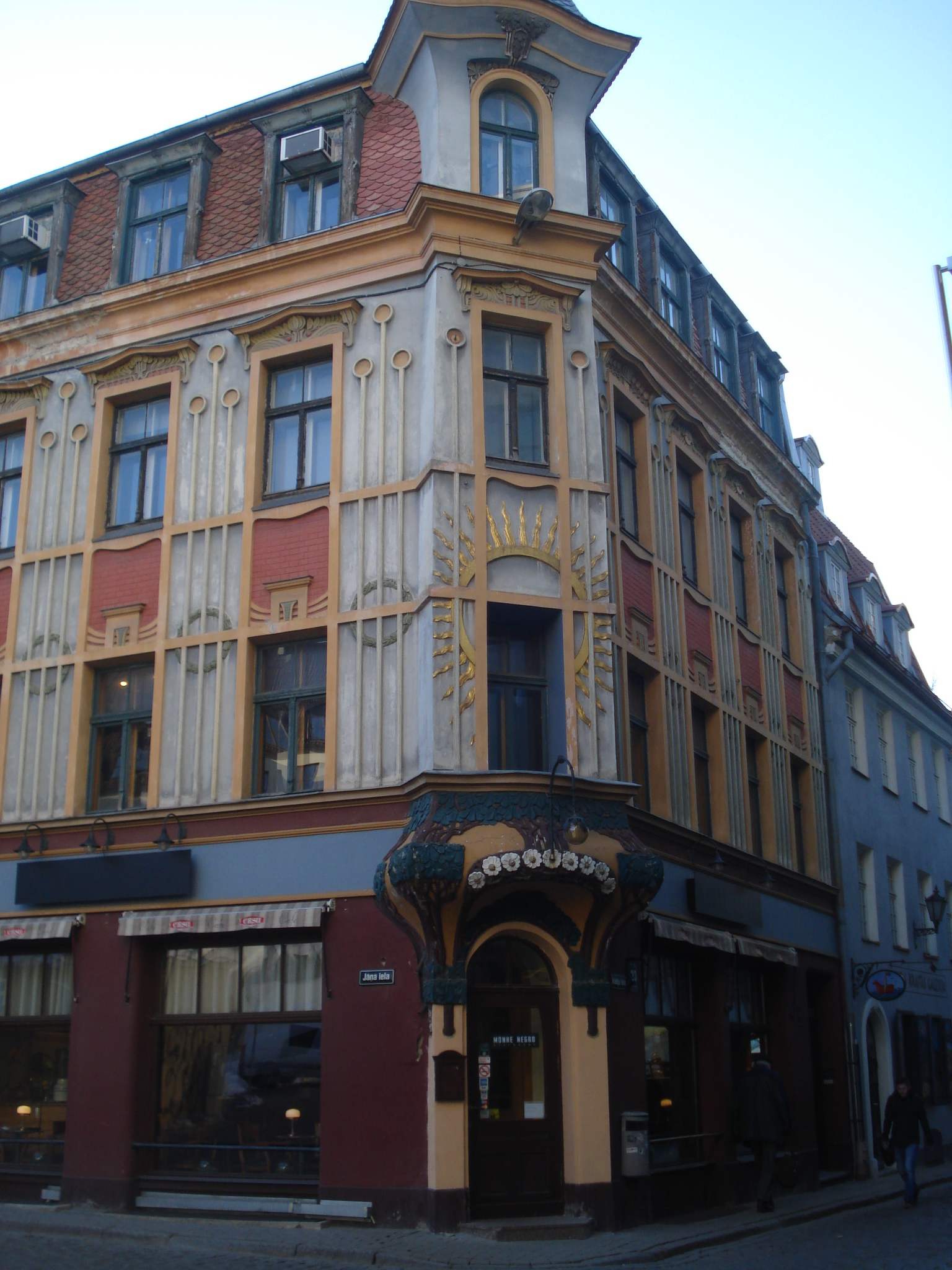
Building by Paul Mandelstamm on Kalēju iela 23

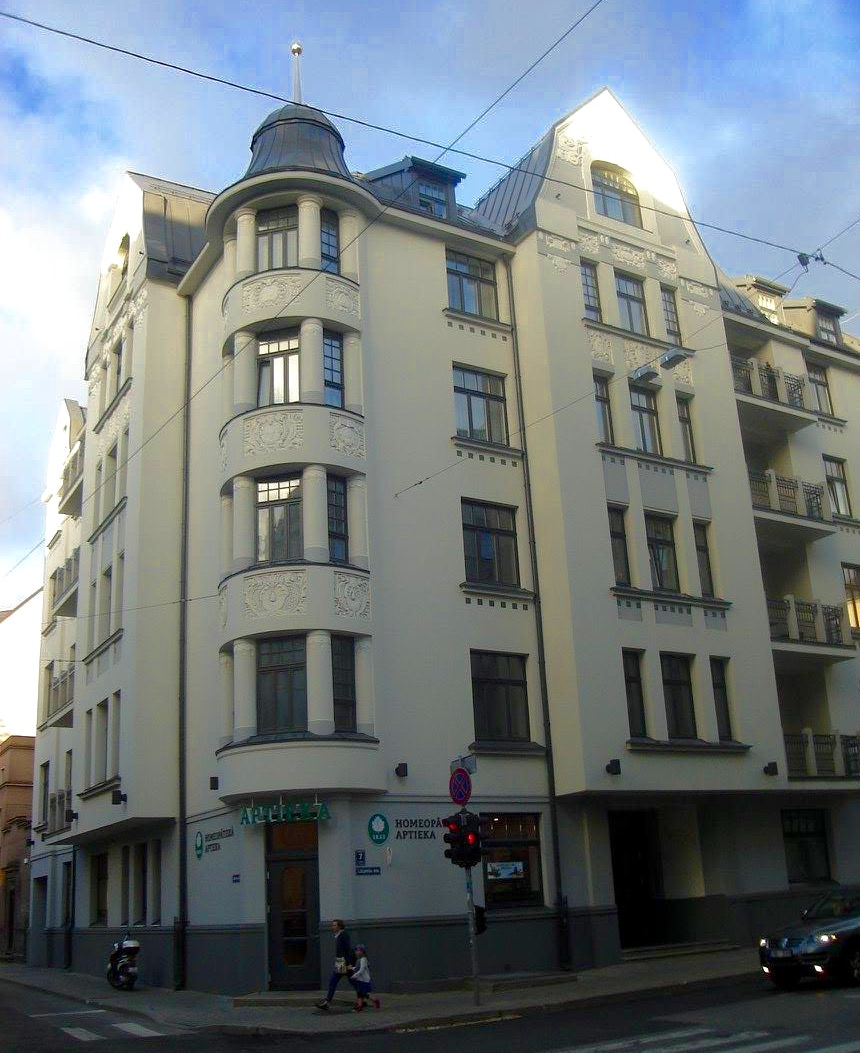
Building by Paul Mandelstamm on Lāčplēša iela 7, Riga.

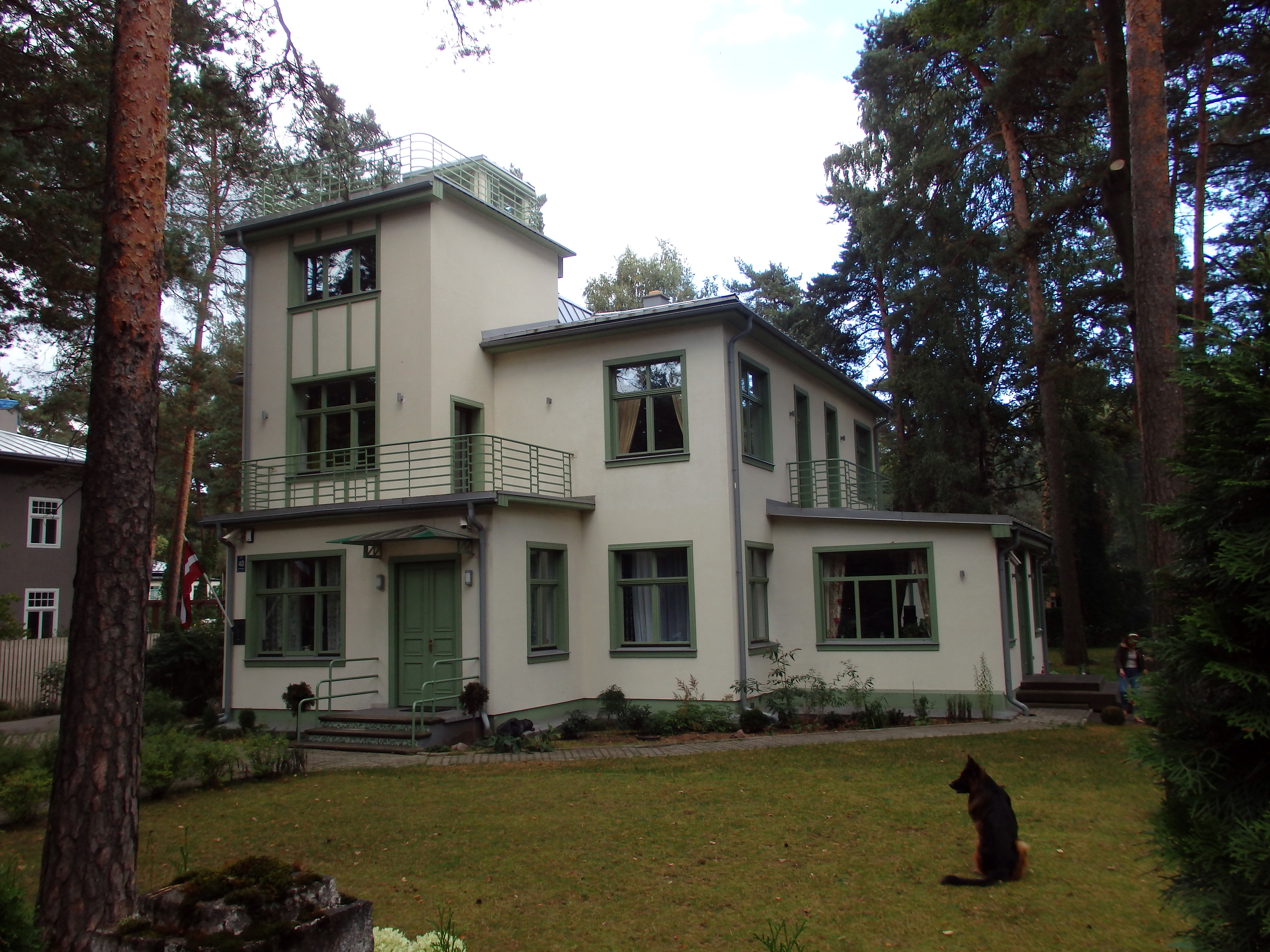
Villa at Meža prospekts 40, Riga. (1930)

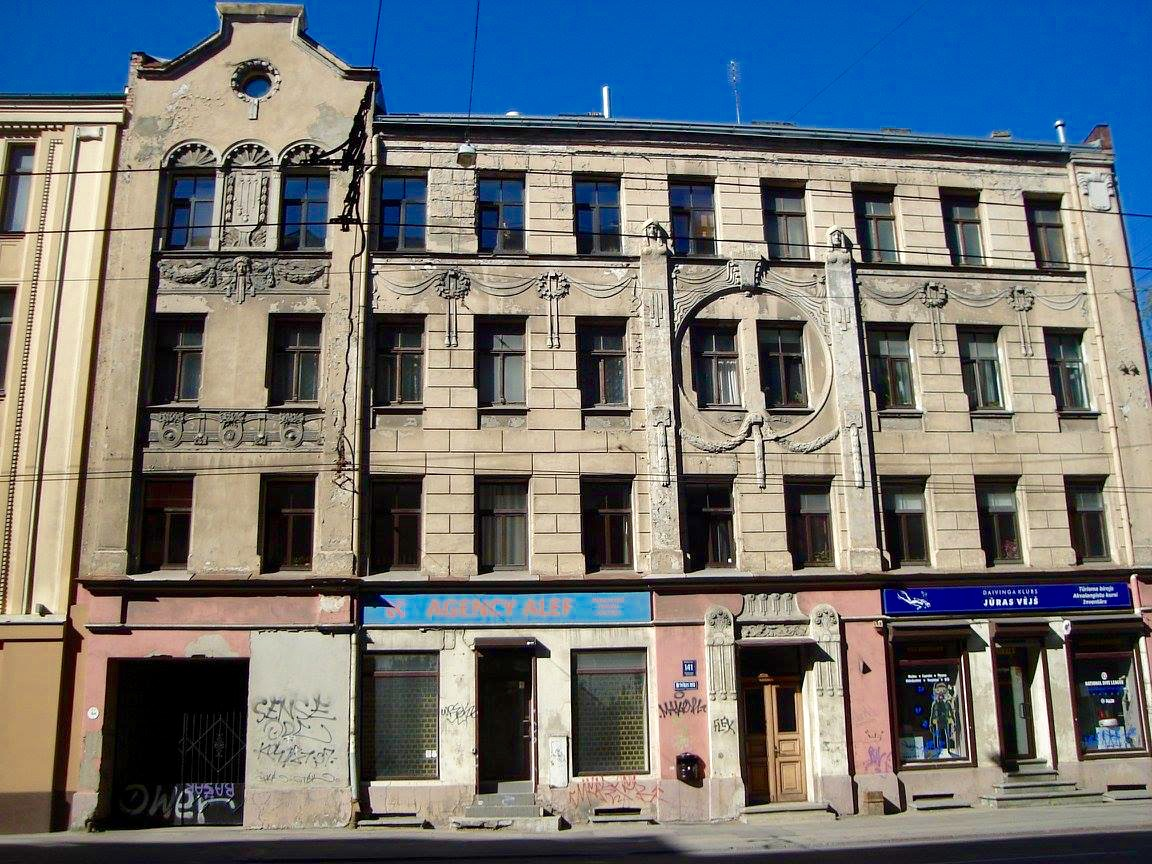
Residential building on the Brīvības street 141, Riga. (1903)
