= David Silberman =

Jewish activist

David Silberman (Preiļi, Latvia in 1934) is a writer, researcher and a Jewish activist who, having escaped death when the Germans invaded Latvia, gathered and published facts, testimony and documents from survivors of the Holocaust living in Latvia in the 1960s. He had several works published on that theme. Silberman lives in New York, is a US citizen and works as a consultant engineer.

== Early life and education ==
Silberman (Zilberman prior to immigration to USA) was born in Preili, Latvia on February 10, 1934. The Silberman family fled the German invasion of their home-town at the end of June 1941 and spent most of the war years in the Tatar region of the USSR. David Silberman graduated in 1957 as an engineer from the Tallinn Polytechnical Institute (Estonia). In 1959, he met and married Bella Tartakovskaya, and the couple raised two children, Emil and Gabriel (Originally Gregory).

== Activism ==
In the 1960s, he joined a collective of Jewish activists intent on collecting facts, testimony and documents from survivors of the Holocaust living in Latvia at that time. On March 10 and 11, 1971, he and 55 fellow Jews from Latvia organized a sit-in and hunger strike within the Reception Hall of the Presidium of the Supreme Soviet of the USSR in Moscow, handing a manifesto to the authorities in charge with a request to allow the Latvian Jews free emigration to Israel. He received permission to emigrate to Israel in April 1971.

Silberman lived in Israel for a number of years, had several works published in that country, and served as a reservist during the Yom Kippur War in 1973. He moved to the United States in 1977 to pursue his career. He now lives in New York City, has become a US citizen, and is still active as a consultant engineer.

Silberman is a member, and in 2013 Acting President, of the Jewish Survivors of Latvia organization.

== Reporting on the Holocaust ==
Because many of the Jewish people who survived the Holocaust were unable, or found it too upsetting, to relate their experiences in readable stories, at the end of the 1950s David Silberman and other activists began to covertly gather information from Jewish survivors of the Holocaust living in Latvia. Silberman met two of the four known survivors of the Rumbula Forest massacres of November and December 1941 (near Riga); these recounted their survival stories to Silberman, as did many other survivors of the Holocaust. He rewrote these stories into readable material, which he began circulating and later publishing.

Serge Klarsfeld, the well known French Nazi-hunter and historian of the Holocaust called David Silberman a "pioneer in the historical research". Distinguished historian, Marger Vesterman, director of the 'Museum of the Jews of Latvia' in Riga had this to say about David Silberman: "during decades he collected a great amount of testimony from survivors of the Holocaust that are now of a considerable historical and teaching value".

Silberman's first published work, in 1966, was The Right to Live - A Documentary Eyewitness Account of a Survivor, telling the story of Ella Medalye, a survivor from the Rumbula Forest (near Riga) massacre where, during just two days, some 28,000 Jews from the Riga ghetto were killed by bullets.

In 1973, while living in Israel, David Silberman transcribed and adapted in Russian the writings that Frieda Michelson, also a survivor from the Rumbula forest killings, had originally written in Yiddish. This material was first published under the title Ia Perejila Rumbuli (I Survived Rumbula) by the kibbutz Lokhamei Agetaot. Well-known historian of the Holocaust in Latvia, Andrew Ezergailis, mentioned these two books as references in his staple work on that subject.

In 1989, Silberman's most ambitious work, entitled I Ty Eto Videl (and You saw it), was published in the United States by the Jewish publishing company Slovo (the Word). This details the German killing of Jews in Latvia and Ukraine during World War II from the point of view of the intended victims. This book was brought to the attention of Serge Klarsfeld, and it was translated into French and published in 2011. The book contains an introduction by Klarsfeld,

David Silberman also wrote the story of Jan Lipke, a Latvian patriot who saved the lives of between 50 and 60 Jews from the Riga ghetto or Arbeitskommandos, hiding them, feeding them, and arming them, until liberation by the Soviet Army. Lipke received the 'Righteous among the Nations' medal in Yad Vashem, Israel, for these actions. Jan Lipke: An Unusual Man was first published in the US in 1987 as part of Muted Voices, later published in 2006 in Riga in a longer version under the title Like a Star in the Darkness - Recollections about Janis (Zhan) Lipke. Historian of the Holocaust in Latvia, Andrew Ezergailis, referred to the original version in his work The Holocaust in Latvia 1941-1944.

As of 2013, David Silberman is still actively writing. He is the only remaining member of the collective of activists formed in Latvia during the 1960s. He has recently finished writing a story about Mordukha Glezer, a Jew who escaped from an Arbeitskommando in Latvia and joined the Soviet partisans.

== Bibliography ==
- The Right to Live - a Documentary Account of a Survivor, Riga 1966, New York 2005;
- History of two Days - Diary of a Demonstrator, essay published in 1971 by the Israeli University edition 'Haumach' and in 1972 in the US journal 'American Zionist';
- Ia Perejila Rumbuli (I survived Rumbula), by Lokhamei Agetaot, Israel, in 1973, republished in Russian recently by the Rossiyskaya Biblioteka Kolokhosta in Moscow, ISBN 5-88832019-6;
- Jan Lipke: an Unusual Man, Slovo, USA in 1989, republished in Riga in 2007 under the title 'Like a Star in the Darkness', ISBN 978-9984-39-280-6, and recently in Russian under the title Podobno Zvezde vo Mrake by the Rossiyskaya Biblioteka Kolokhosta in Moscow;
- I Ty Eto Videl (and You saw it), Slovo, USA 1989, published in Russian in Riga in 2006, ISBN 9984-19-970-3, published in French in France for restricted circulation, under the title La Fosse - La Ferme aux Poux et autres témoignages sur la Shoah en Lettonie et Ukraine rassemblés par David Silberman, in 2011, by the 'Beate Klarsfeld Foundation', and republished recently in Russian by the Rossiyskaya Biblioteka Kolhokosta in Moscow.
