= Liepaja Executions Film =

Historical film

The Liepāja Executions Film is an 8 mm film comprising 18 shots (approx. 90 seconds) that document the execution of three groups of Latvian Jews by firing squad near the harbor of Liepāja in the summer of 1941. The footage was captured by Reinhard Wiener, a German naval petty officer, who later claimed to have come across the execution by chance.

The executions filmed are part of a series of killings in and around Liepāja, also known as Liepāja massacres.

In 1961, the film was featured in the documentary Auf den Spuren des Henkers ("In the steps of the Hangman") by Peter Schier-Gribowsky, a West German correspondent in Jerusalem during the Eichmann trial. Schier-Gribowsky brought the footage to the attention of the prosecution, which subsequently submitted it as evidence in court—one of the most significant instances of film documentation being used in a Holocaust trial.

Today, the Liepāja Executions Film remains one of the most frequently cited audiovisual records in Holocaust documentaries. It is the only known surviving film footage of Einsatzgruppen mass executions.

The original 8mm positive is hosted at Agentur Karl Höffkes.

== Screenshots ==
All 18 shots represented by one screenshot:

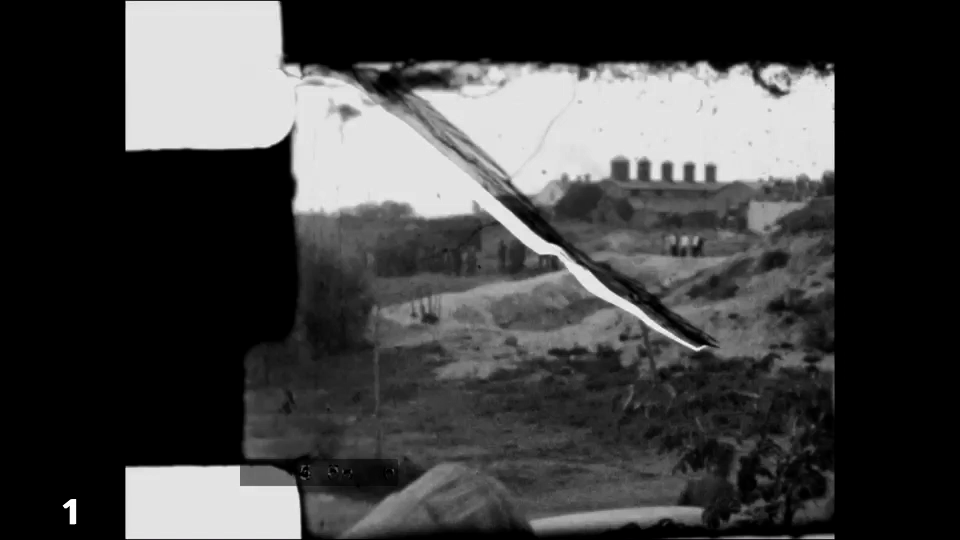

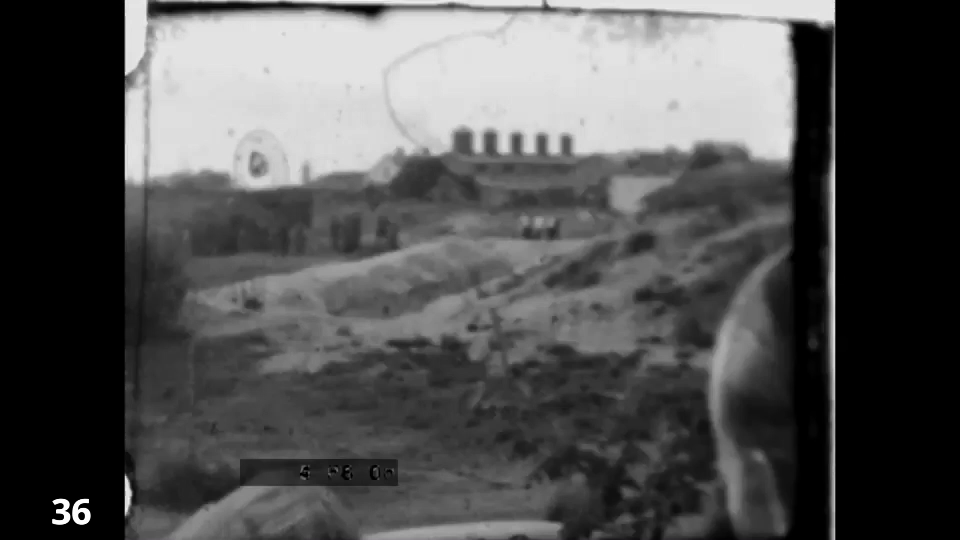

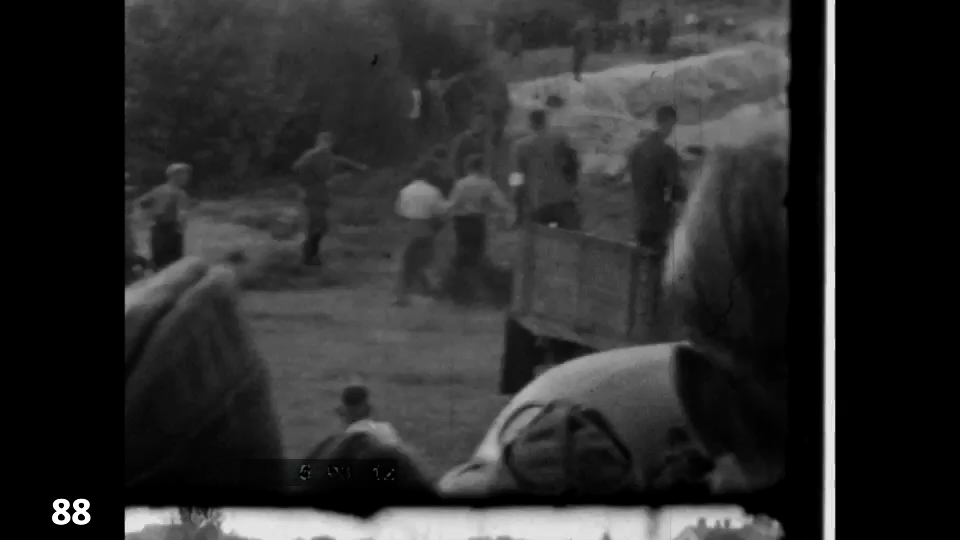

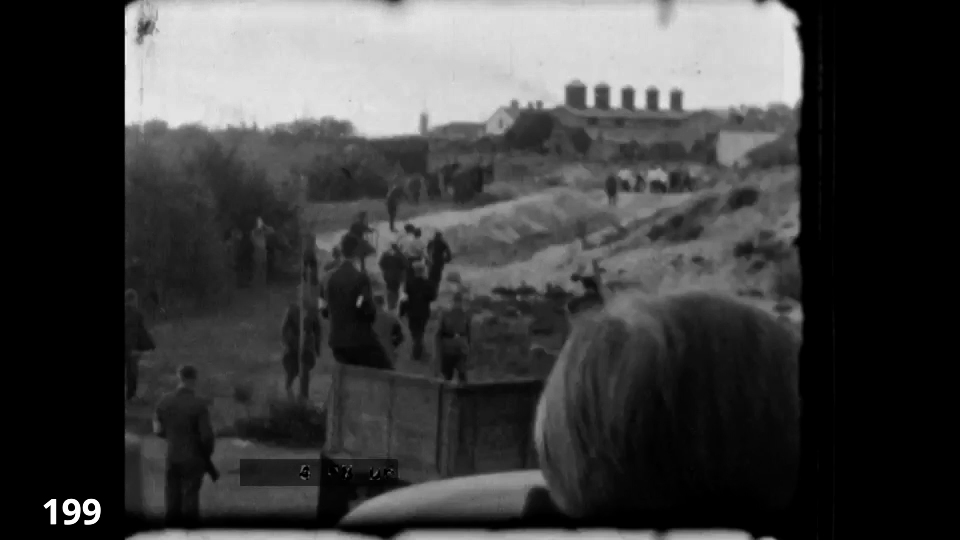

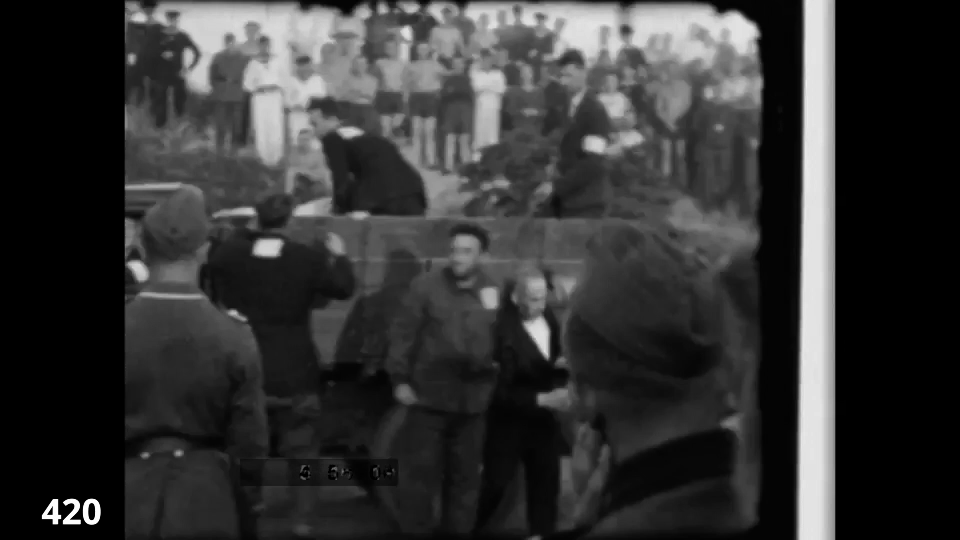

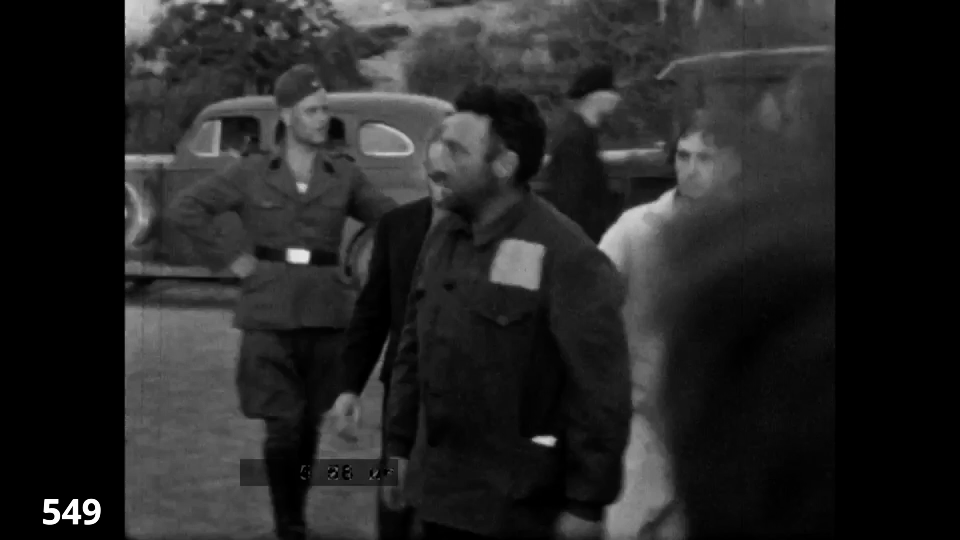

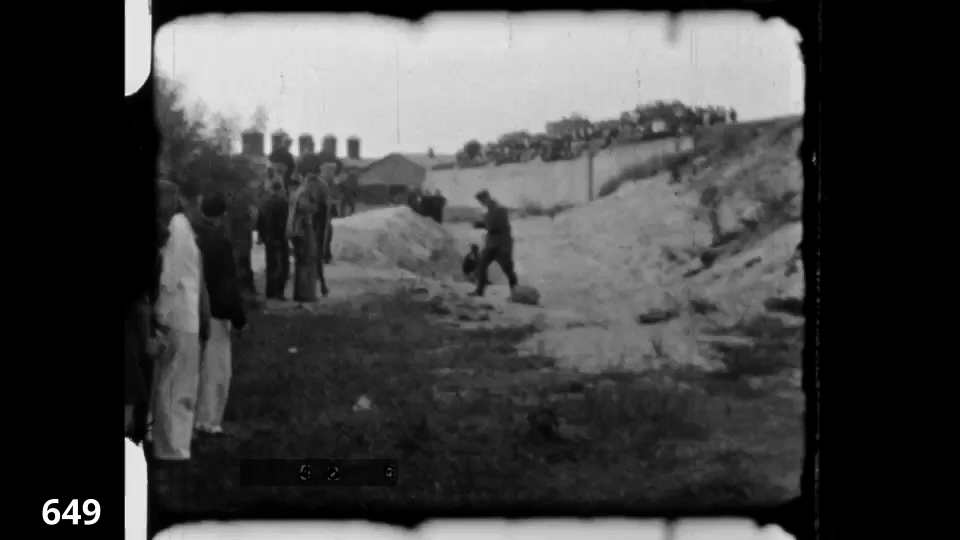

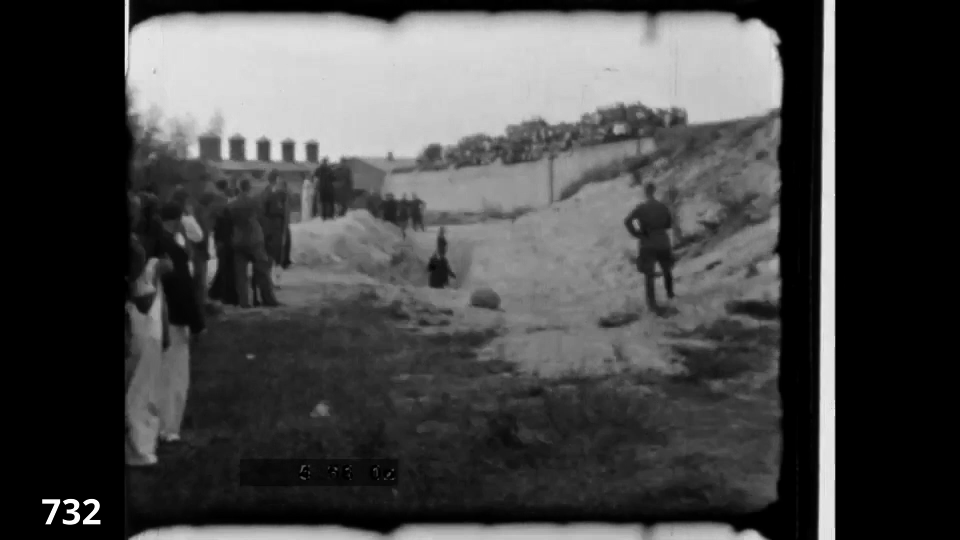

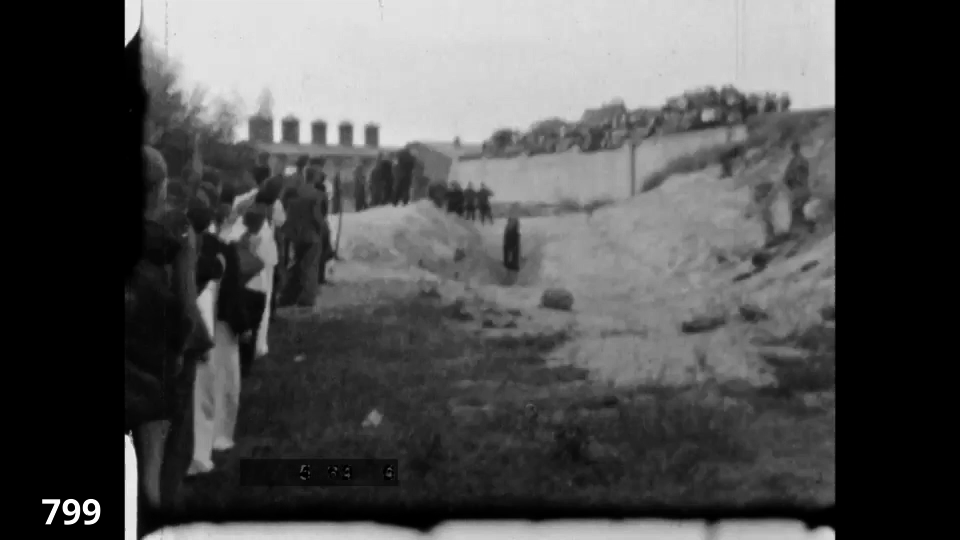

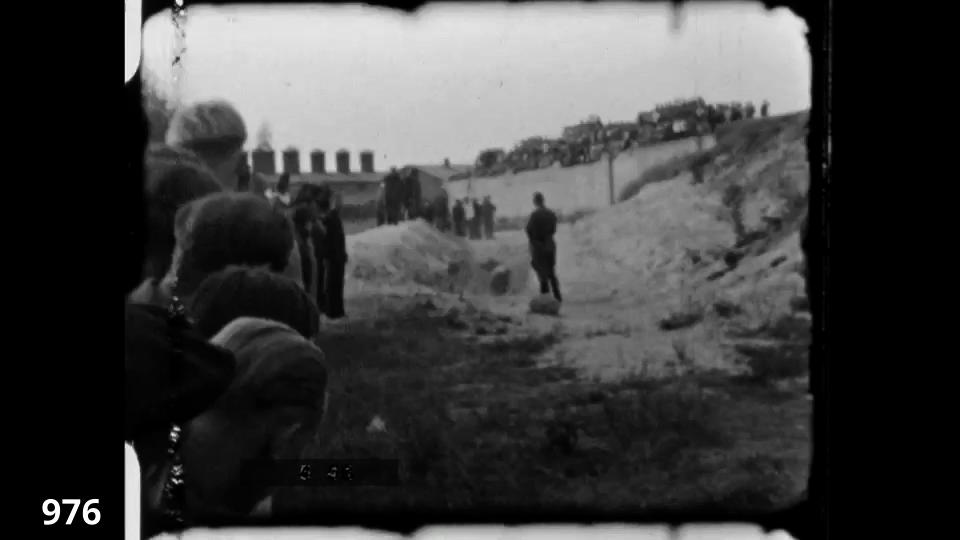

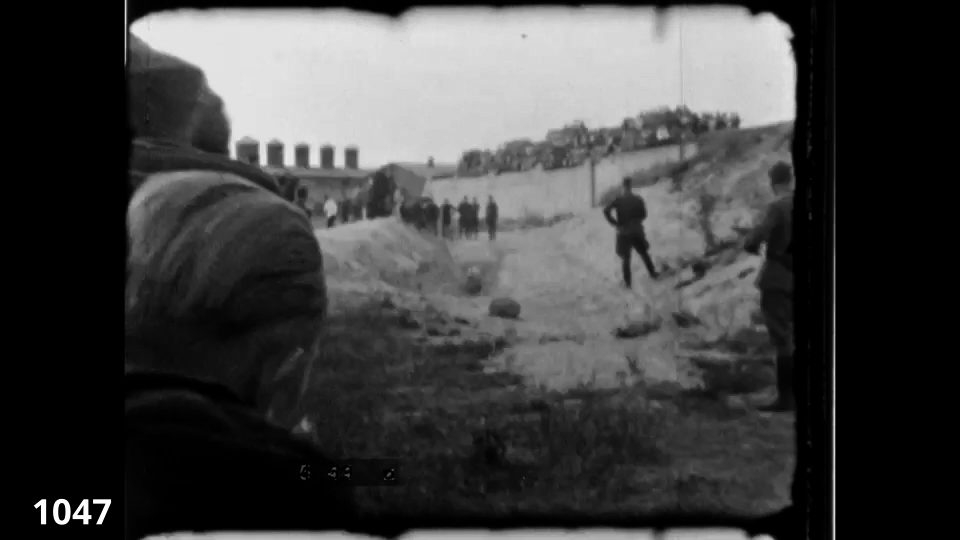

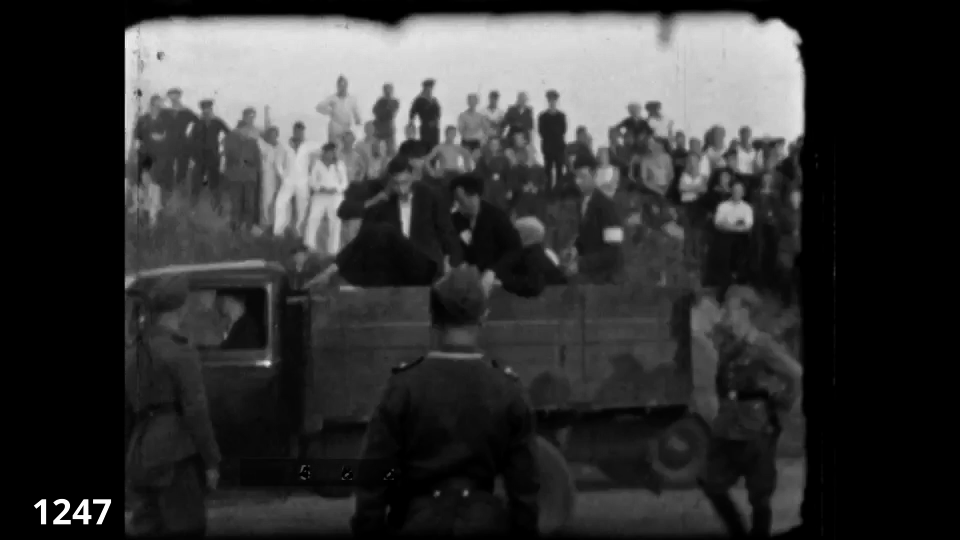

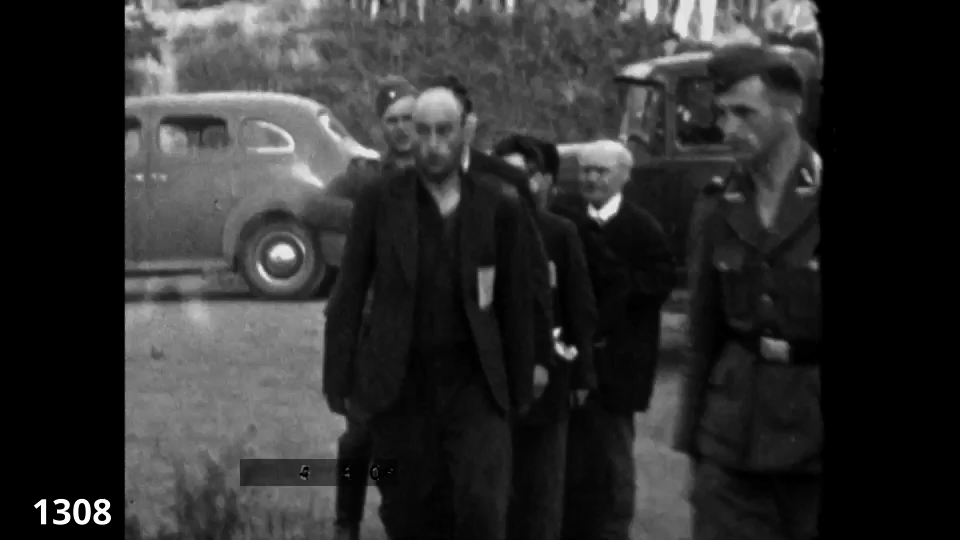

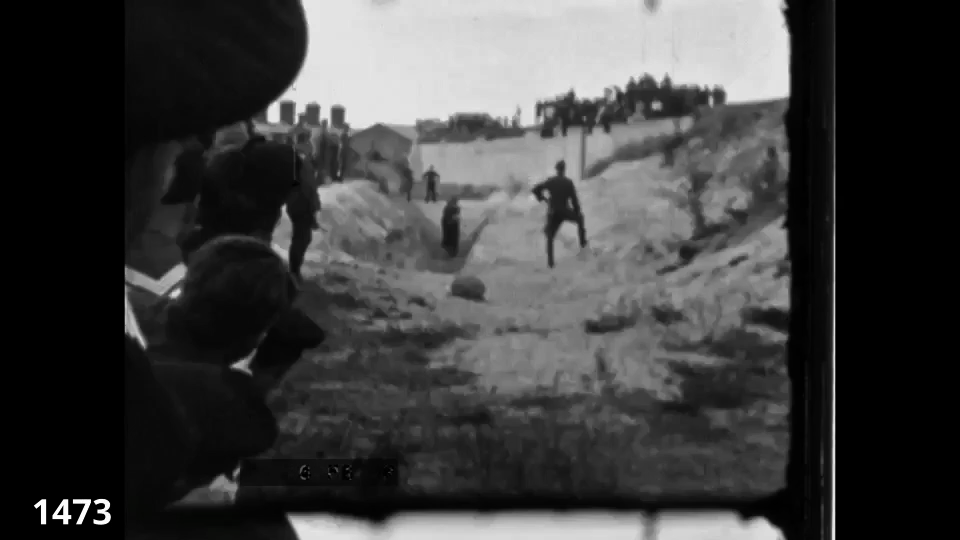

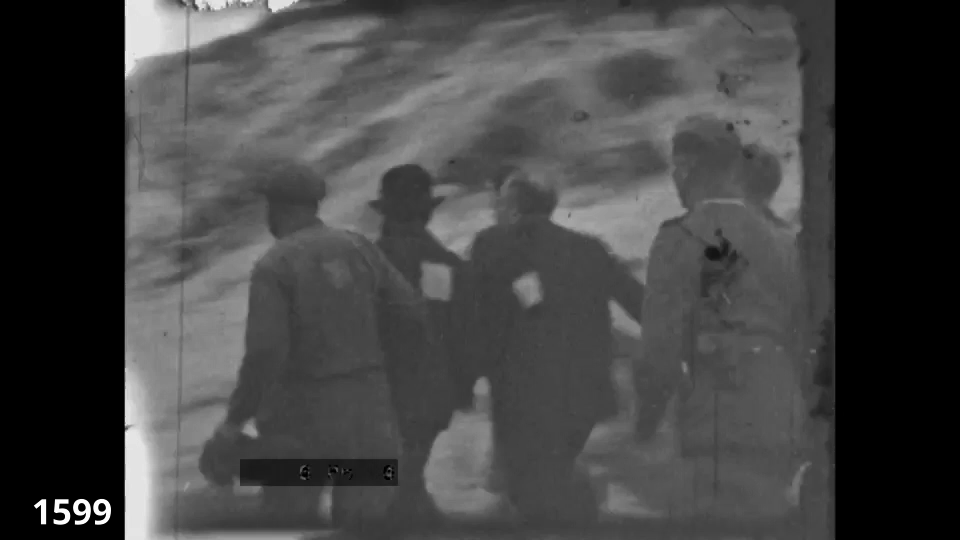

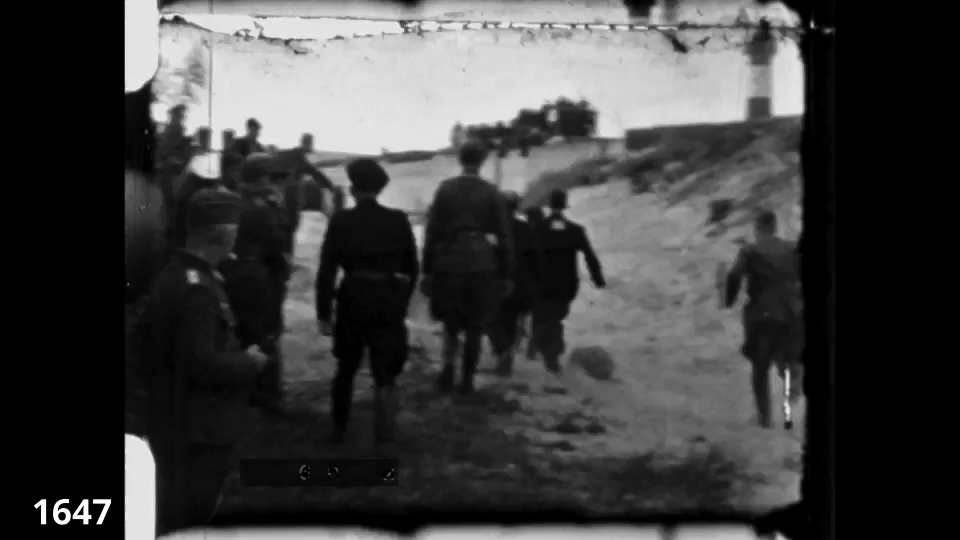

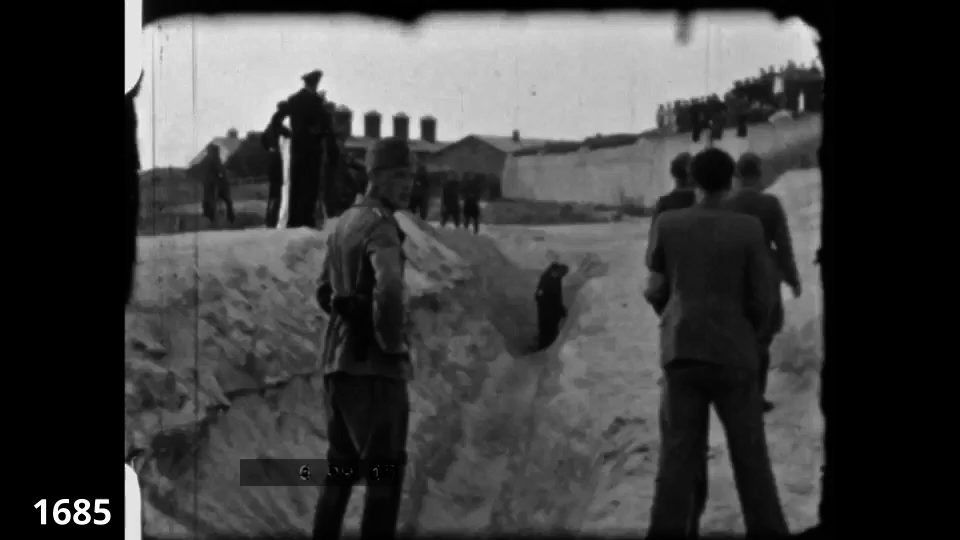

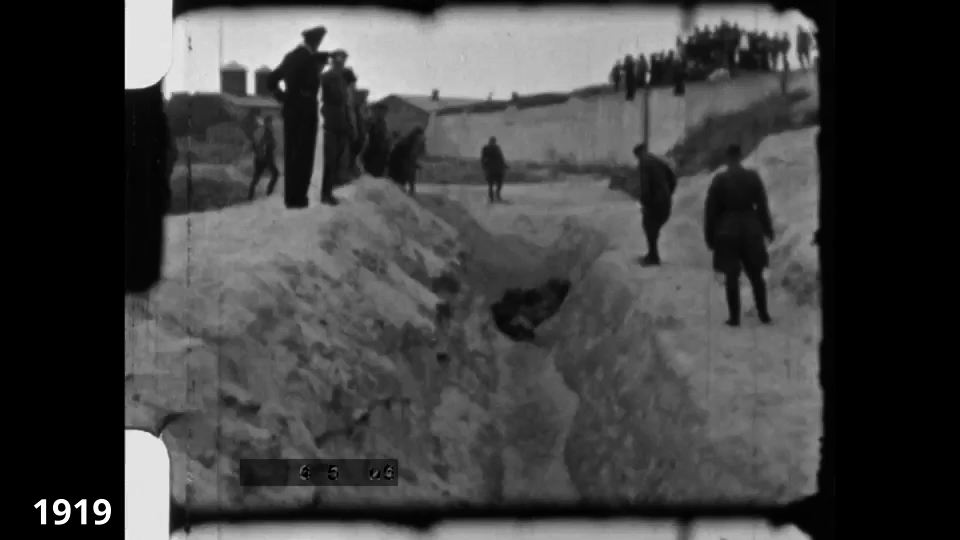

== Popcultural references ==
Material from the Liepāja Executions Film appears in other films such as (selection): The 81st Blow (1974), Pillar of Fire (TV series) (1981), The Yellow Star: The Persecution of the Jews in Europe 1933–45 (1981), Genocide (1981 film), The Last Days (1998), Defiance (2008 film), Shoa par balles (2008), Shoah, les oubliés de l’histoire (2014), Who Will Write Our History? (2018), The U.S. and the Holocaust (2022), Goebbels and the Führer (2024).
