= Otto Fischer (footballer) =

Austrian footballer and manager

Personal information
- Date of birth: 1 January 1901
- Place of birth: Vienna, Austria-Hungary
- Date of death: 1 July 1941 (aged 40)
- Place of death: Liepāja, Reichskommissariat Ostland
- Position: Forward

Senior career*
Years	Team	Apps	(Gls)
1920–1921	ASV Hertha Wien		
1921	Karlsbader FK		
1923–1926	First Vienna FC		
1926–1930	Hakoah Vienna		

International career
1923–1928	Austria	7	(0)

Managerial career
- 1928: Napoli
- 1931: Mačva Šabac
- 1932–1934: DSV Saaz
- 1934–1935: Concordia Zagreb
- 1936–1941: Olimpia Liepaja
- * Club domestic league appearances and goals

Otto Fischer (1 January 1901 – 1 July 1941) was an Austrian football coach and player. He played as left winger. He made 7 appearances for the Austria national football team. He was killed in the Liepāja massacres in Latvia during the Holocaust in Latvia.

== Playing career ==
Fischer was Jewish and born in the Austrian capital Vienna, back then capital of Austria-Hungary. His parents were Heinrich Fischer, born in 1860 in Jevíčko, Moravia (now the Czech Republic), and Netti Fischer (née Pokorná) born in 1870 in Žebrák.

Fischer played with ASV Hertha Wien in the Austrian National League and Karlsbader FK. He then played six consecutive seasons in the Austrian championship, first as left forward with First Vienna FC (3 seasons, 1923 till 1926), then with Hakoah Vienna (3 seasons, 1926 till 1930) and including a spell with Wacker Wien (half season of 1927–28).

Between 1923 and 1928 he made 7 appearances for the Austria national football team. A knee injury ended his playing career.

== Managerial career ==
Fischer became coach of Napoli at the start of the 1928–29 Divisione Nazionale, but was replaced during the season by Giovanni Terrile.

He coached Serbian side Mačva Šabac in the 1931 Yugoslav Championship. He also coached DSV Saaz and HŠK Concordia.

In 1936, he moved to Latvia, where he coached Olimpia Liepaja. Under him, the team did not lose a game as they won the League in Fischer's first season, and again in 1938 and 1939.

He was killed in the Liepāja massacres, Latvia, in July 1941.

== See also ==
- List of select Jewish football players
