= Wolfgang Kügler =

SS officer (died 1959)

Wolfgang Kügler (died 1959) was an SS-Untersturmführer (Second Lieutenant) and a Teilkommandoführer (detachment leader) for Einsatzkommando 2, a subdivision of Einsatzgruppe A. Following World War II, he was tried and found guilty of war crimes before a court in West Germany. His sentence was reported to have been 8 months in prison and a fine. The most serious charge against him was that he had organized and been a commander at the massacre of about 2,700 Jews, mostly women and children, on the beach at Liepāja, Latvia. Kügler claimed he was absent on leave in Germany when these murders occurred. After being re-arrested in 1959, Kügler killed himself in prison.

== The Einsatzgruppen and the SD ==
The Nazi occupation regime planned to kill as many "undesirable" people as possible in the immediate wake of the invasion, Operation Barbarossa. "Undesirables" in the Baltic States included Communists, Gypsies, the mentally ill, and especially Jews. The executions were to be carried out by four task forces, known as Einsatzgruppen (A, B, C, D); for the Baltic States the responsible unit was Einsatzgruppe A, initially under the command of Franz Walter Stahlecker. A Nazi secret police organization known as the Sicherheitsdienst or SD furnished most of the personnel for the Einsatzgruppen. The SD first established its power in Latvia through Einsatzgruppe A, which was subdivided into units called Einsatzkommandos 1a, 1b, 2 and 3. As the front line moved further east, Einsatzgruppe A moved out of Latvia, remaining in the country only a few weeks, after which its functions were taken over by the "resident" SD,

== Activities in Latvia ==
Kügler arrived in Liepāja, Latvia on 10 or 11 July 1941, to take over command of the resident SD. From then until April 1943 he was responsible for the massacres in Liepāja and the vicinity. Consistent with SD practice, orders for killings were not issued in writing but were given only orally. Kügler travelled to Riga every two weeks to receive instructions. Kügler personally supervised at least one mass shooting.

== The December massacre at Šķēde ==
In December 1941 the Liepāja SD, together with their Latvian collaborators, carried out the execution of approximately 2,700 Jews on the beach at Šķēde. Photographs were taken of the December killings and these survive today. They are some of the most well known images of the Holocaust in Latvia. Whether Kügler was actually present at the December massacre is a matter of dispute. At post-war trials, several German SD witnesses said Kügler was absent on leave, while all the Latvian witnesses said he was present.

== Career after Latvia ==
In April 1943 Kügler was replaced by SS-Obersturmbannführer (Lieutenant Colonel) Kurt Jurgschait. According to a post-war trial in Germany, the grounds for his removal were his theft of property that had once belonged to the Jews whom he had murdered. He was also suspected of being too friendly with the Latvians, including his mistress and interpreter, Mrs. Kronbergs. Professor Ezergailis reports that Kügler was sentenced to 8 months imprisonment and a fine. In 1959, Kügler was re-arrested and charged with murder. He killed himself by jumping out of a window of a prison in Frankfurt on 2 December 1959.
