= Fritz Dietrich (Nazi) =

Nazi mass murderer

- Born: Fritz Maria Josef Dietrich; 6 August 1898; Lavarone, Kingdom of Italy
- Died: 22 October 1948 (aged 50); Landsberg Prison, Allied-occupied Germany
- Known for: Liepāja massacres
- Political party: Nazi Party
- Status: Executed by hanging
- Motive: Nazism
- Conviction: War crimes
- Trial: Dachau trials
- Penalty: Death
- SS career
- Allegiance: Nazi Germany
- Branch: Schutzstaffel
- Service years: 1936–1945
- Rank: SS-Obersturmbannführer

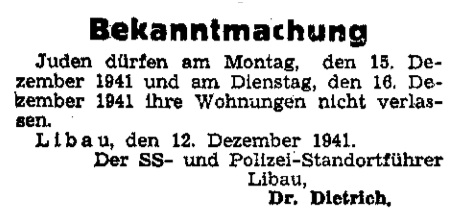
Nazi police warning issued by Fritz Dietrich to the Jews of Liepāja to remain in their houses on December 15 and 16, 1941 (this was preparatory to their murder on those dates.)

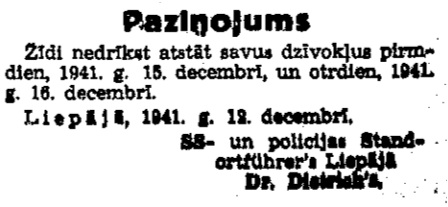
Dietrich's warning (in Latvian)

Fritz Maria Josef Dietrich (6 August 1898 – 22 October 1948) was an Austrian SS officer and member of the Nazi Party. He held a doctoral degree in chemistry and physics. His name is also seen as Emil Dietrich. After the war, Dietrich was tried as a war criminal by the Dachau Military Tribunal for ordering the killings of 7 American prisoners of war. He was found guilty of these murders and executed.

It is now known that Dietrich was responsible for organizing the Liepāja massacres, in which over 5,000 Jewish men, women, and children were massacred by the Germans and Latvian collaborators. Lesser numbers of Roma, Communists, and mentally ill people were also killed.

== Nazi war crimes ==
After school, Dietrich fought in World War I. He then completed a degree in chemistry, which he completed with a doctorate. In 1930, Dietrich became involved in Nazi Party. Dietrich joined the Nazi Party in 1933, and the SS in 1936. In 1934, he played a leading role in the July Putsch.

In 1941 Dietrich held the rank of SS-Obersturmbannführer. From September 1941 to November 1943 he served as the local SS and police chief in Liepāja (Libau in German), Latvia. Police units under his command carried out a number of massacres of civilians in Liepāja, for the most part of Jewish ethnicity. The largest of the Liepāja massacres took place over three days from December 15 to December 17, 1941. On December 13, the newspaper Kurzemes Vārds published an order by Dietrich which required all Jews in the city to remain in their residences on Monday, December 15 and December 16, 1941, thus facilitating the killing operations.

From April 1944 to the end of the war, Dietrich was the police chief of Saarbrücken.

== War crimes trial ==
After World War II, Dietrich was not prosecuted for his actions in Latvia, which were not known at the time. Instead, he was tried by an American military court for ordering the executions of seven downed American airmen who had parachuted from disabled airplanes. The men had been killed after surrendering. He was found guilty and sentenced to death. In 1948, Dietrich was hanged at Landsberg Prison, coincidentally the same prison where Hitler had been incarcerated for his involvement in the Beer Hall Putsch of 1923. The trials of Dietrich and others were known as the "Flyers Cases" and were part of what has since become known as the Dachau Trials for war crimes.

When asked if he had any last words, Dietrich showed a lack of remorse:

"In the conviction that my death for my passionately beloved fatherland, for which I worked and fought my entire life, will ultimately be of service, I go this last walk of sacrifice with a proud heart because I know that my sacrifice will contribute to fill the measure of suffering that has been imposed by a cruel victor over the German people without compelling reason."
