= Sorella Epstein =

Latvian Jewish girl killed in 1941

- Born: 25 August 1931; Liepāja
- Died: 15 December 1941 (aged 10)
- Known for: victim of the Liepāja massacres

Sorella Epstein (25 August 1931 – 15 December 1941), was a young Latvian girl, murdered because she was Jewish during the Liepāja massacres.

== Biography ==
She was born in 1931 into a Latvian family in Liepāja. Her parents were Roza and Jacob Epstein according to her birth certificate registered in Liepāja. In May or June 1941, her father and her uncle Chaïm were arrested by the Soviets, because they were likely to be opposed to their ideology due to their occupations as merchants. They were then deported to Siberia, where they died a few years later, unaware of their family's fate. Sorella and her remaining family found refuge in their aunt's home, where the Nazis made an arrestation raid on 1 July 1941. She was arrested and shot by the Latvian militia along with four other women, one of whom was her mother, and a picture was taken minutes before the murder on 15 December 1941.

Philippe Labrune saw the photograph on display at the Jewish Museum of Latvia in Riga, picturing four women and a little girl hiding her face standing behind a woman, taken just before their execution during the Liepāja massacres. He then tried to find the identity of the four women in the photo, especially the little girl on the left, who was hiding her face on the photograph. He recounted this investigation in a documentary film entitled Sorella, une enfant dans la Shoah, broadcast on 8 March 2014 on France 5. The film was produced by Michel Welterlin and the script was co-written by Philippe Labrune and Jean-Marie Montali.

The photo also appeared in the documentary Einsatzgruppen, les commandos de la mort by Michaël Prazan, broadcast on France 2 in 2009.

== History of the photography ==
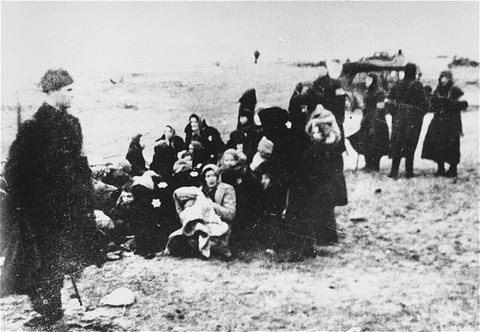
Member of the Latvian militia guarding Jewish women and children before their murders, during the Liepāja massacres in 1941.

Philippe Labrune saw the photograph in the Jewish museum in Riga. It is part of a series of twelve photographs taken on 15 December 1941. The series shows the massacre perpetrated on the beach at Šķēde, in Liepāja, which lasted three days. The photos were taken with a Minox camera, the people in it had to pose. Philippe Labrune wondered who these women and this little girl were, and how these photos had escaped the destruction of the material evidence of the Holocaust systematically practiced by the Nazis at the end of the war. Photos of the Liepāja massacre sometimes show Latvian policemen or soldiers in uniform. No German soldiers appear in the photo, as they were the ones taking the photos, but a German military vehicle appears in one of the photos. It was customary for German soldiers to surround the pits to watch the executions and to take photographs, but the bullets were fired by soldiers specifically hired for the job. David Zwirzon's daughter, Ilana Yvanova, director of the Jewish Museum, answered Philippe Labrune's questions during an interview. She told him that when she was eight or nine years old, she discovered in a crockery cupboard a bowl containing various objects, including two photo rolls. Her father David Zwirzon was a Jew kept alive to do maintenance work. In 1942, he had to repair an electrical failure at the German security police headquarters. He saw some photographic rolls in an open drawer and grabbed them. He made copies of them and later replaced them during an alleged breakdown. He buried the films behind the stables of the police building so that he would not have to carry them with him. He managed to escape from the Liepāja ghetto and lived in hiding in a cellar for two years. In 1944, when Liepāja was liberated, he handed the rolls over to the Soviets.

The photos of the massacre were taken by Carl-Emil Strott, an SS-Oberscharführer. They were later used as exhibits at the Nuremberg trials.

Edward Anders was 15 years old at the time of the massacre, but he was able to recognize the identity of the women in the photographs. Later, a biometric identification search was made for Roza Epstein by Yvonne Desbois and Raoul Perrot, based on identity photos kept in the municipal archives, establishing her identity with a 90% probability. Two other women on the right could be Mia Malka Epstein and her mother Emma Rathaus (aunt of Sorella and mother of Mia).

== Bibliography ==
- Yvonne Desbois et Raoul Perrot, À la recherche de Sorella Epstein, une enfant dans la tourmente de la Shoah, assassinée en décembre 1941 sur la plage de Skede (Lettonie), Cahiers Lyonnais d'AnthropoBiométrique, 5, 2016, Lyon-France, ISSN 2260-0442.
- Philippe Labrune, 2014. Sorella une enfant dans la Shoah, documentaire, Films & Docs et Label Brune Prod, 2014.
- Prazan, Michaël (2012). Einsatzgruppen les commandos de la mort nazis (in French). Paris: Ed. Points. ISBN 978-2-7578-2871-7. OCLC 801039003.
