= Edmund von Trompowsky =

Baltic German architect (1851–1919)

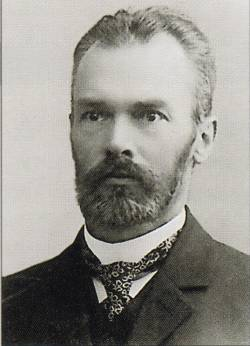
- Born: 16 March 1851; Riga, Russian Empire
- Died: 19 January 1919 (aged 67); Riga, Latvia
- Known for: architecture
- Movement: Eclecticism

Edmund von Trompowsky (16 March 1851 – 19 January 1919) was a Baltic German architect working mainly in present-day Latvia.

Edmund von Trompowsky studied civil engineering and architecture at Riga Polytechnical Institute (today Riga Technical University) and graduated in 1878. Until 1879 he then ran his own architectural firm in Vitebsk Governorate but by 1880 had established himself in Riga. In addition to his work as an architect, he worked as an assessor for several insurance companies. During his career he designed more than 100 apartment buildings in Riga, in addition to industrial and public buildings in the city. He was also active outside of the city, contributing designs for buildings for several smaller towns in present-day Latvia. He also provided designs for larger urban projects in Riga. Most of his buildings are in an eclectic style.

== Gallery ==
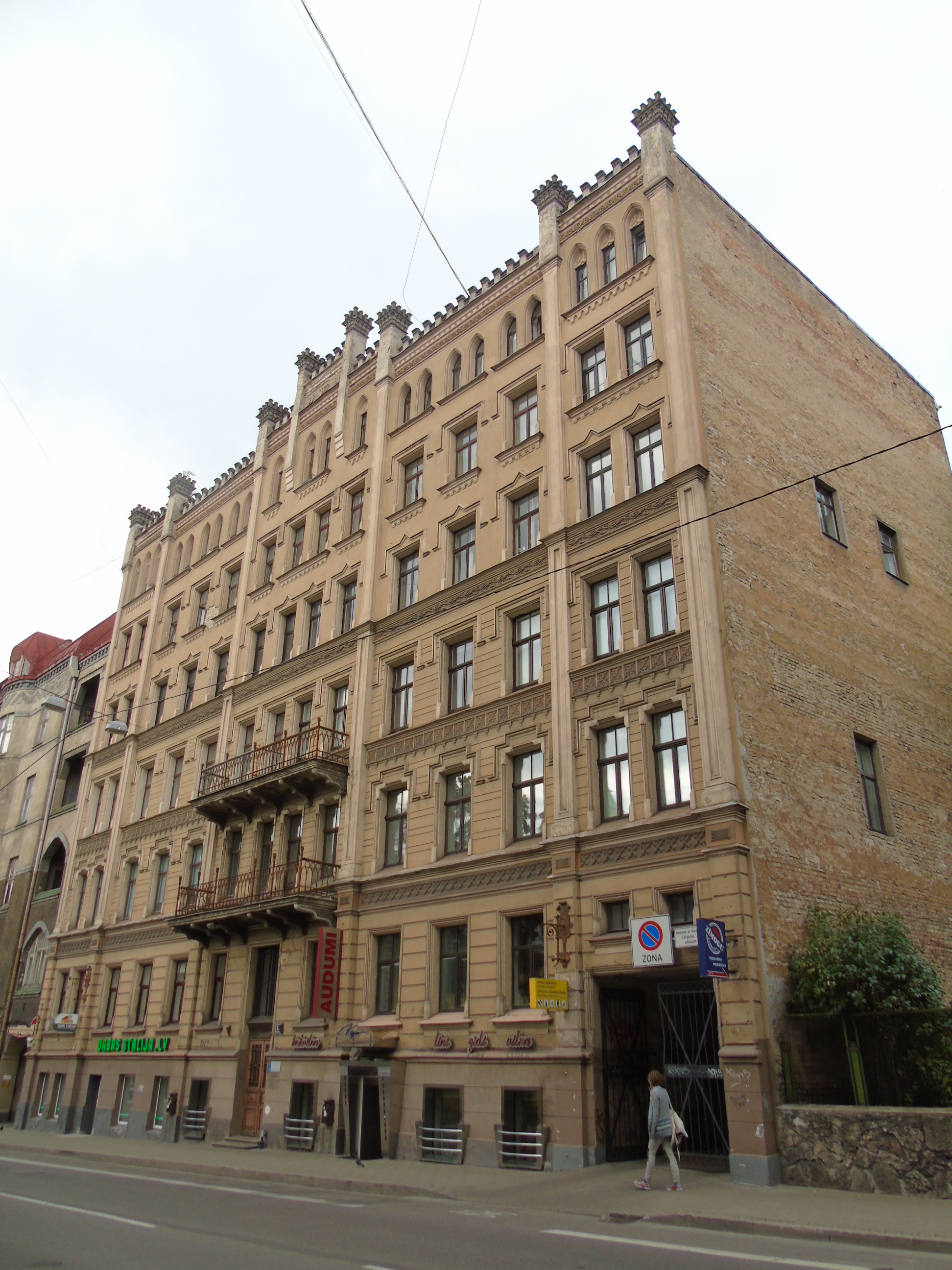
Residential building at Lāčplēša iela 17, Riga (1896)

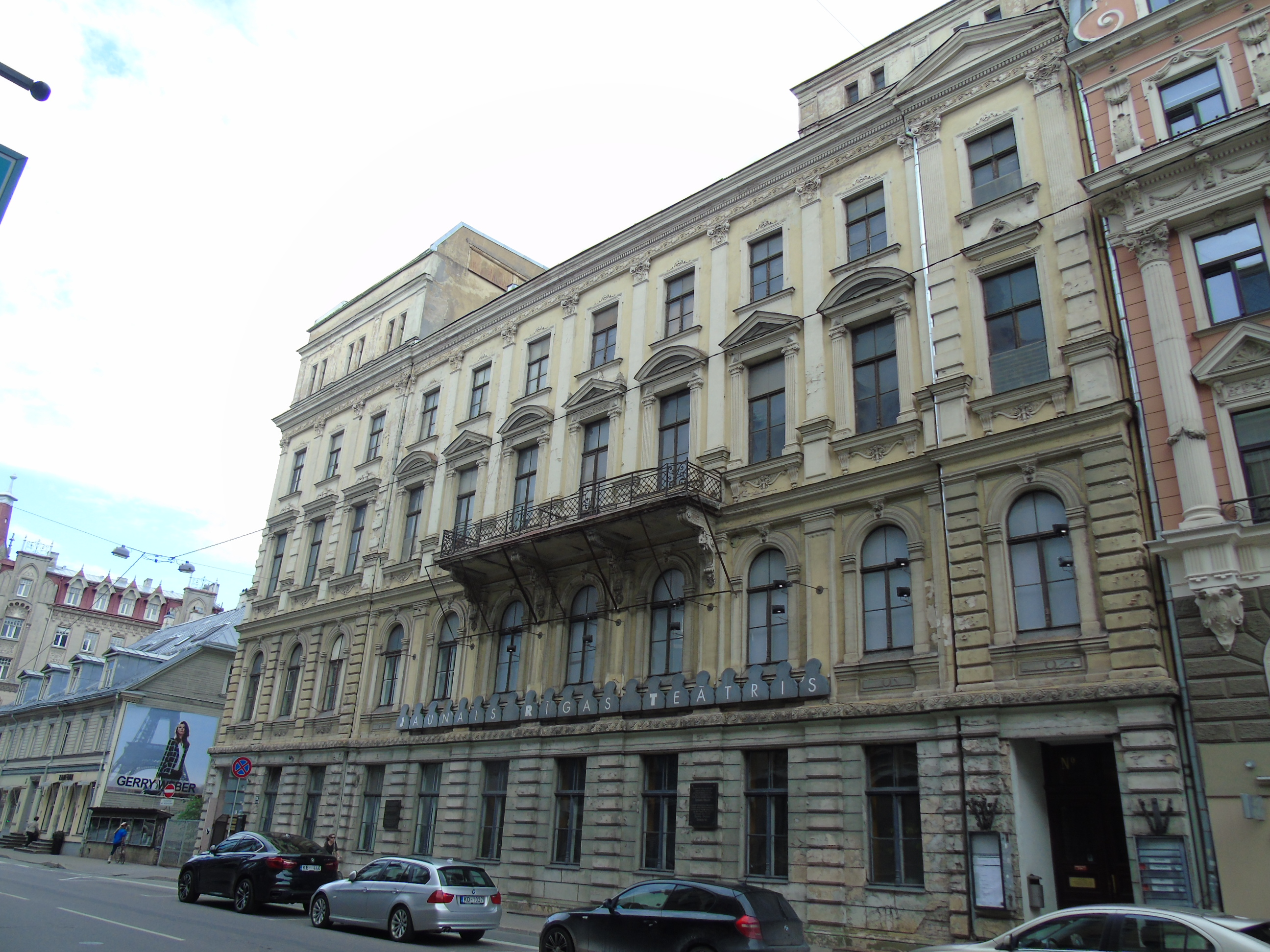
Building of former Latvian craftsman society at Lāčplēša iela 25, Riga. Now New Riga Theatre. (1902-1905)

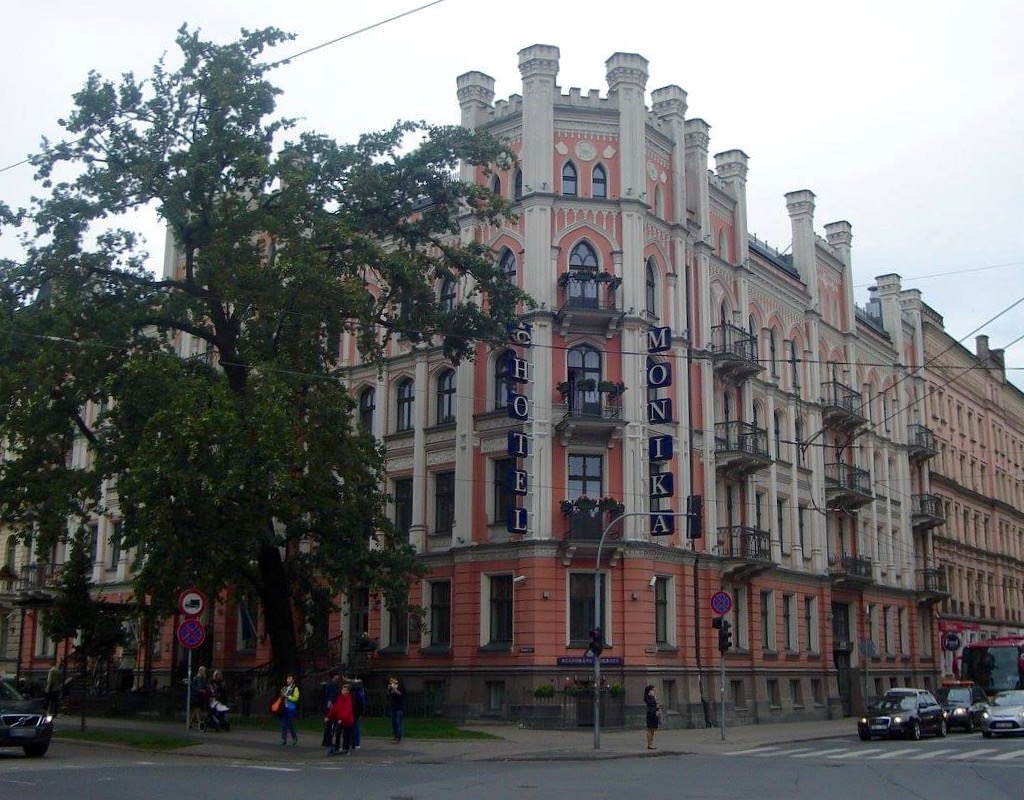
Residential building at Pulkveža Brieža iela 1, Riga (1883)

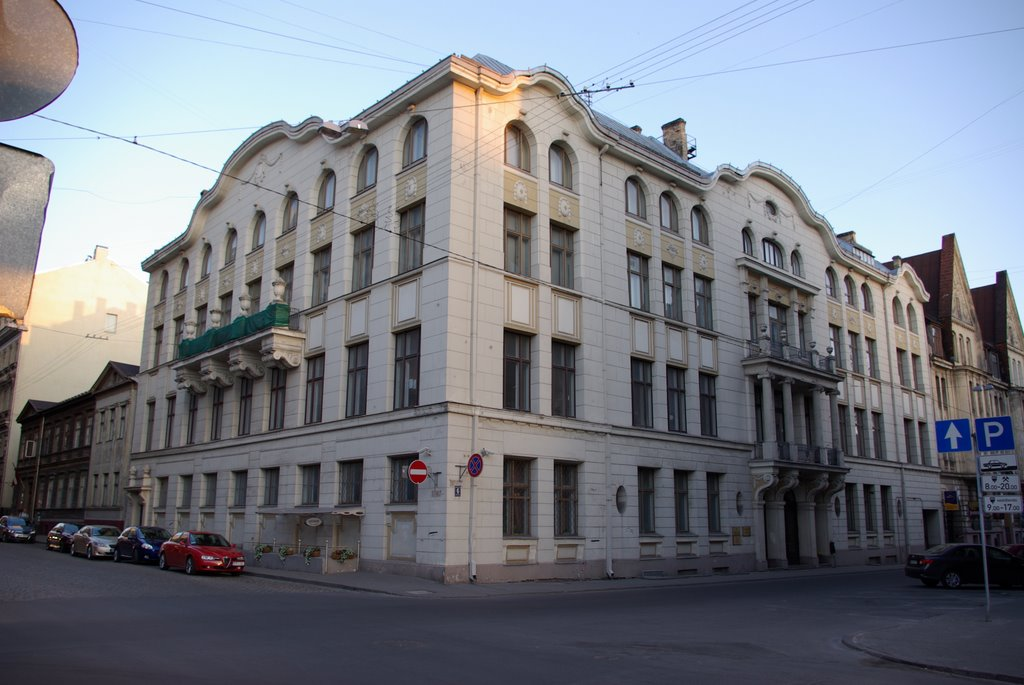
Building of former Jewish theatre and community house at Skolas iela 6, Riga. Now Museum Jews in Latvia. (Together with P. Mandelstamm 1913–1914).

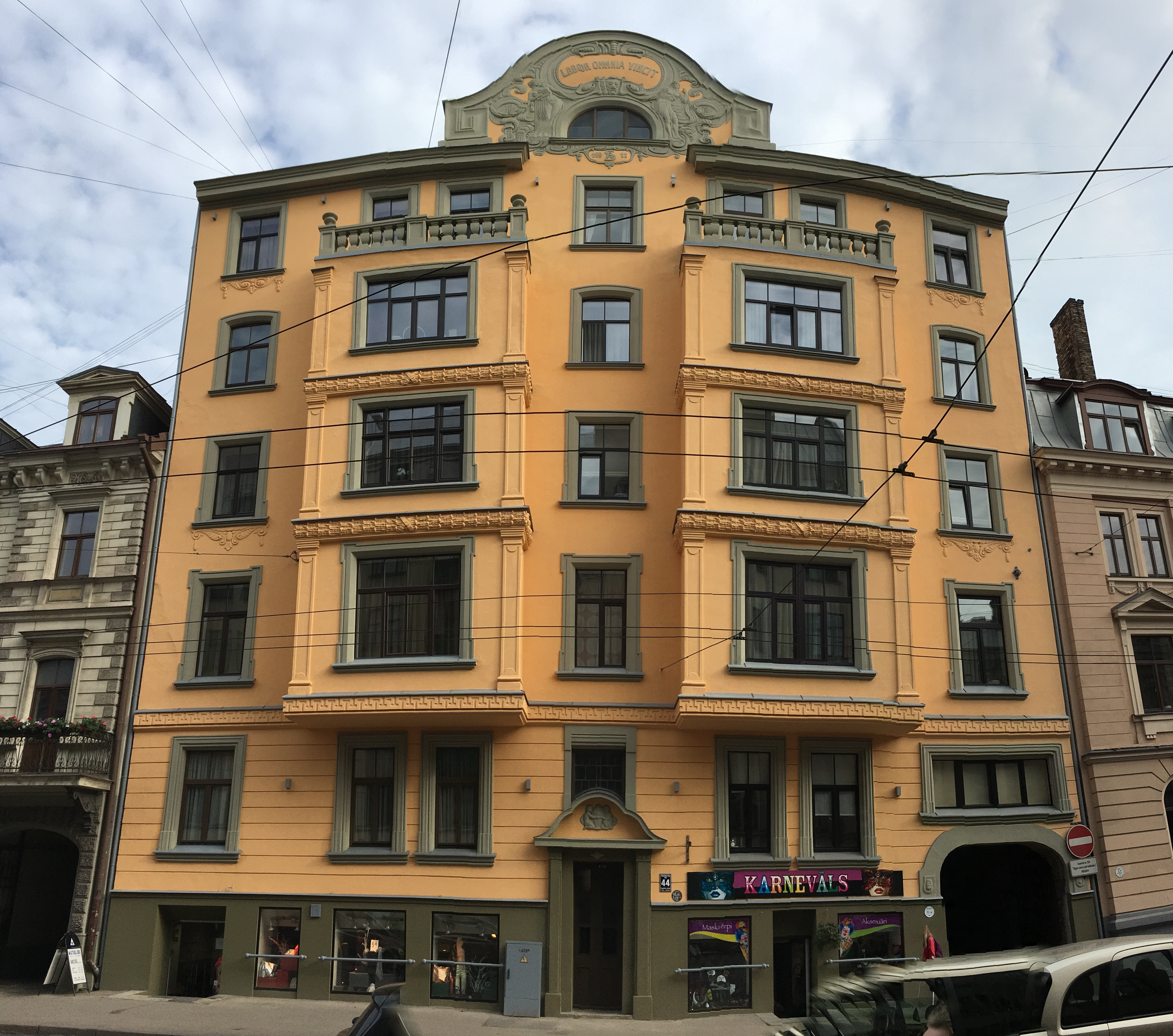
Residential building on the A. Čaka street 44, Riga. (1911).

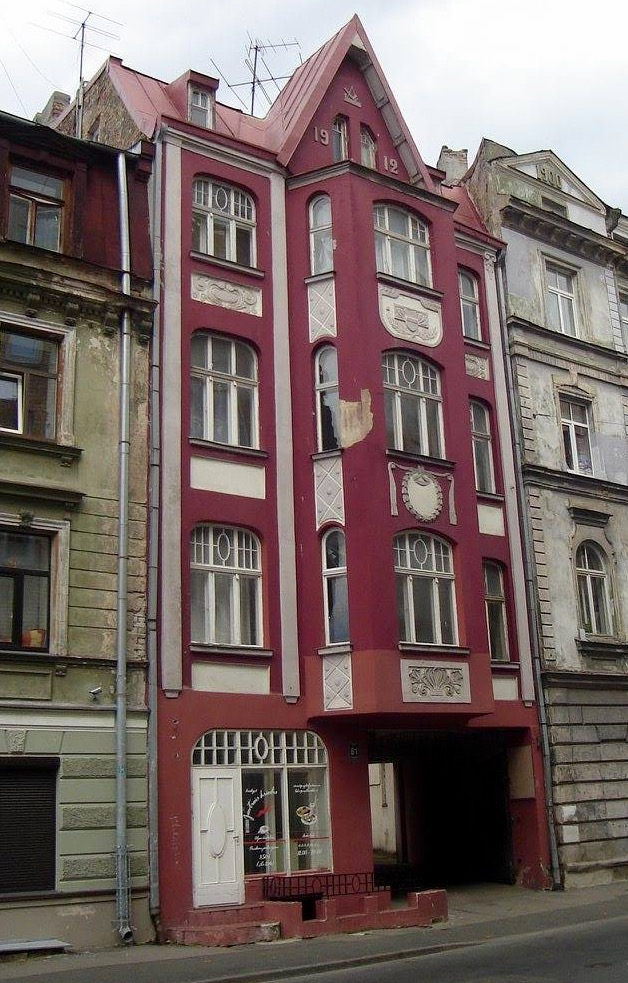
Residential building on the Bruņinieku street 81, Riga. (1911).

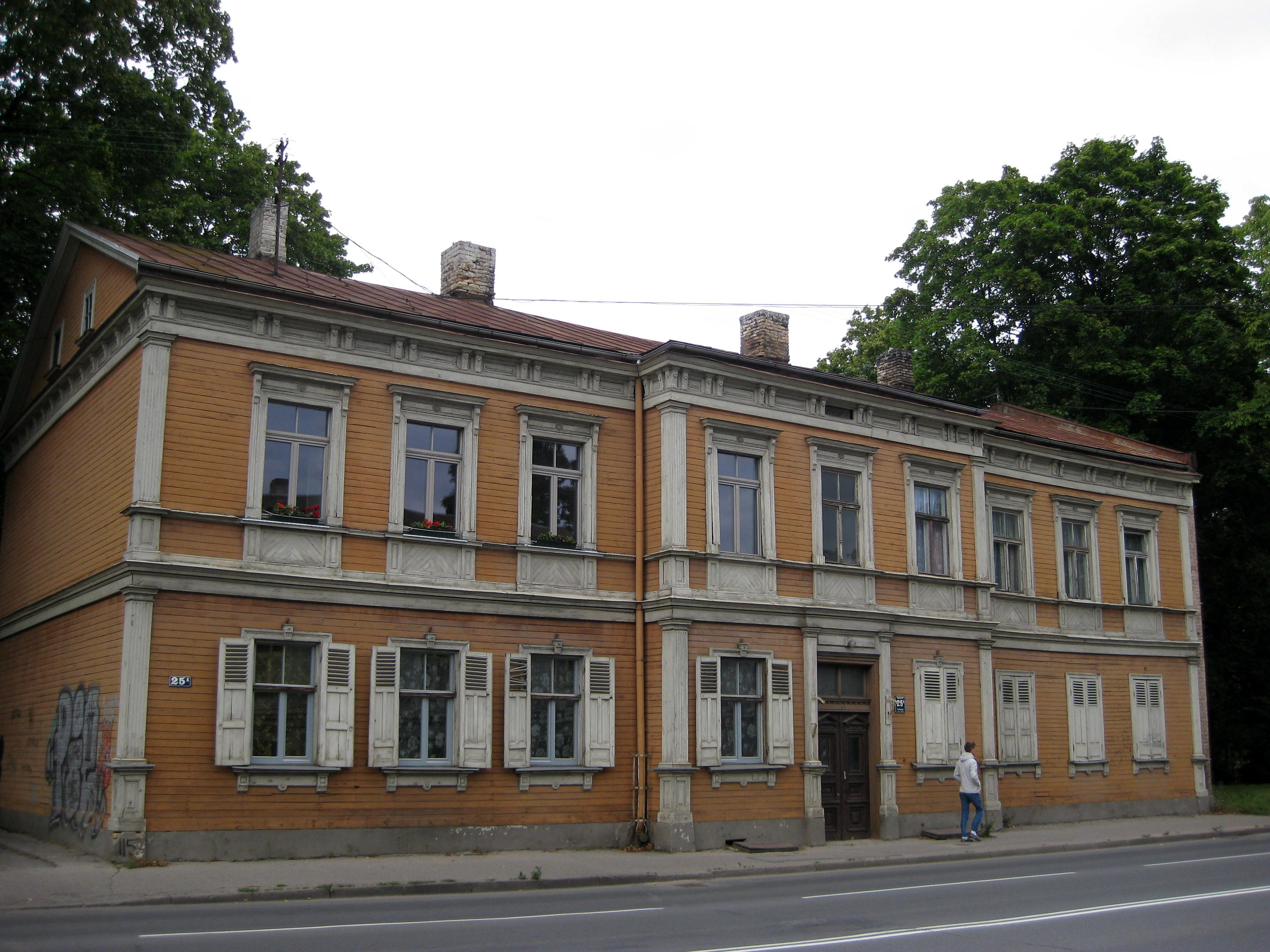
Residential building on the Kalnciema street 25A, Riga (1899)
