= Šķēde =

Suburb of Liepāja, Latvia

Coordinates: 56°36′41″N 21°01′40″E

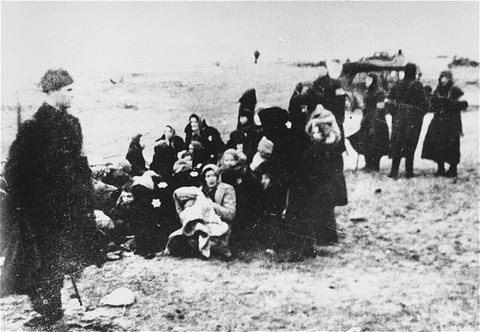
Members of the Latvian SD Police assemble a group of Jewish women for execution on a beach near Liepāja, 15 December 1941.

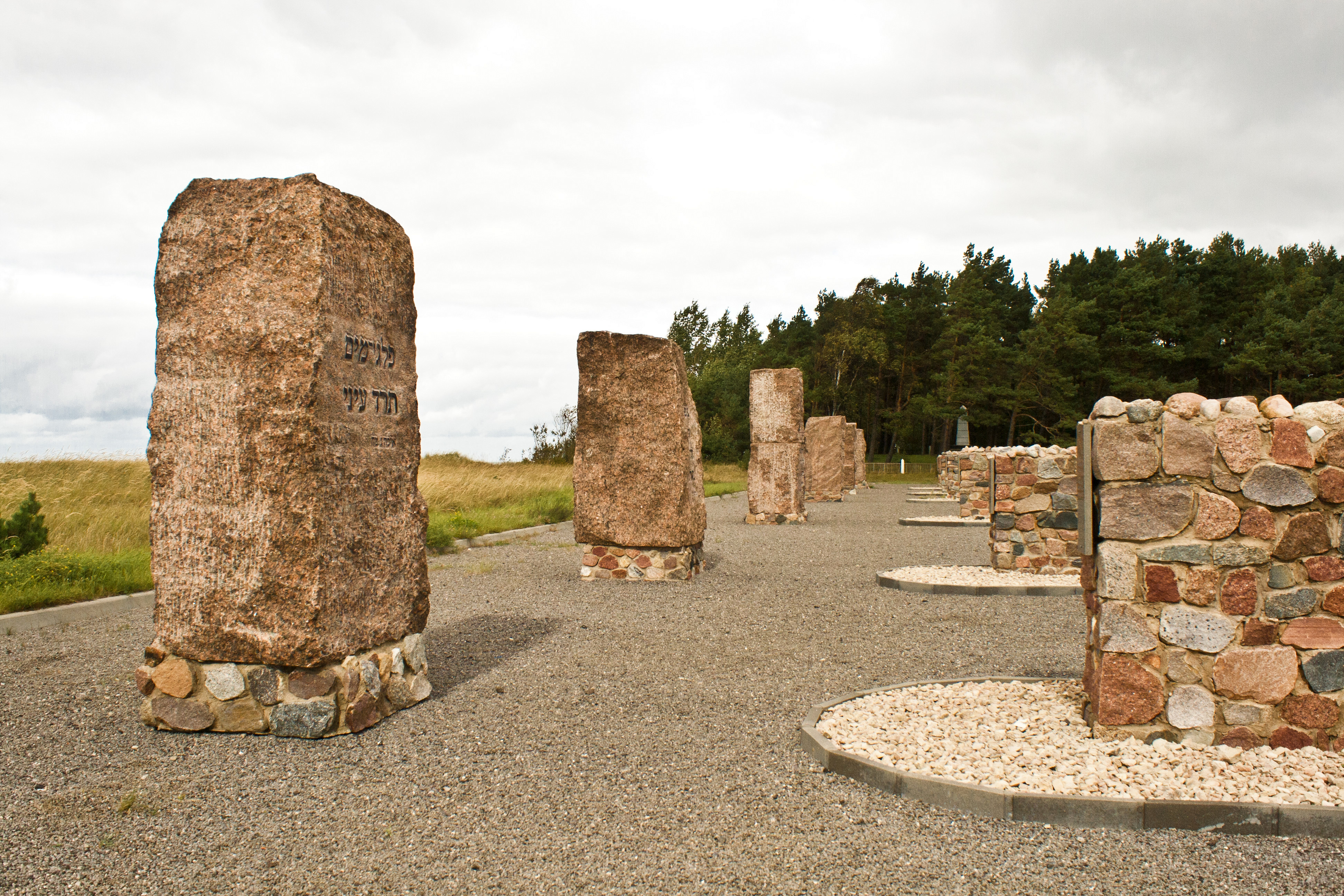
Memorial cemetery

Šķēde is a suburban settlement near Liepāja, Latvia, in Medze Parish, South Kurzeme Municipality. It is located on the north border of the city. Šķēde was the biggest dacha cooperative in Latvia in the time of the Latvian SSR. One of Šķēde's notable features is its street names, which are known as "lines" and numbered from 1 to 18. Typical Šķēde addresses may thus appear as: Šķēde 1-15-2. Until 2005, the main Liepāja landfill was located near Šķēde.

== History ==
Šķēde is also known for the Nazi Liepāja massacres in 1941. The main perpetrators were detachments of the Einsatzgruppen, the Sicherheitsdienst (or SD), the Ordnungspolizei and Latvian auxiliary police and militia forces. Wehrmacht and German naval forces also participated in the shootings. In addition to Jewish men, women and children (c.5,000), the Germans and their Latvian collaborators also killed Roma (c.100), communists, the mentally ill (c. 30) and so-called "hostages". In memory of this event, a memorial stone has been installed in the dunes near the settlement.
