= Jews in Latvia (museum) =

Museum in Riga, Latvia

Coordinates: 56.9566°N 24.1171°E

Jews in Latvia Museum
- Muzejs „Ebreji Latvijā”

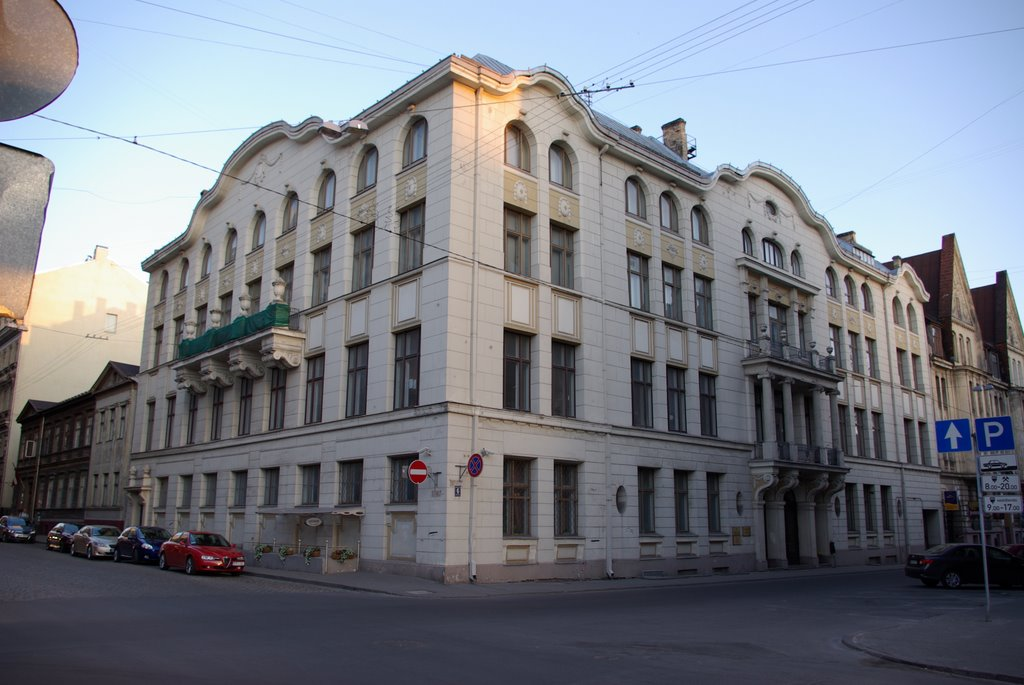
- Riga Jewish community and the museum building
- Established: 1989
- Location: Skolas iela 6, Rīga, Latvia
- Type: History museum
- Director: Iļja Ļenskis (since 2008)
- Website: www.jewishmuseum.lv/en/

The Jews in Latvia Museum (Latvian: Muzejs „Ebreji Latvijā”, Hebrew: מוזיאון יהודים בלטביה, romanized: Muzeon Yehudim BeLatviya) is in Riga, Latvia. The main tasks of the museum are the research and popularisation of the history of the Jews in Latvia and the collection and preservation of evidence regarding the community of Latvian Jews from its beginning. The museum was founded in 1989. It is part of the Latvian Jewish community and one of the few private museums in Latvia accredited by the state.

Latvian historian Iļja Ļenskis became director in 2008.

== History ==
The museum was founded by a group of Holocaust survivors, under the leadership of the historian Marģers Vestermanis in 1989. The museum originally acted as a centre of documentation, but in 1996 the first small, permanent exhibition was organised. The museum is located in three halls, documenting the history of Latvian Jews from the 16th century until 1945. Lectures, educational programmes and different cultural events are organised in the museum.

== Exhibition ==
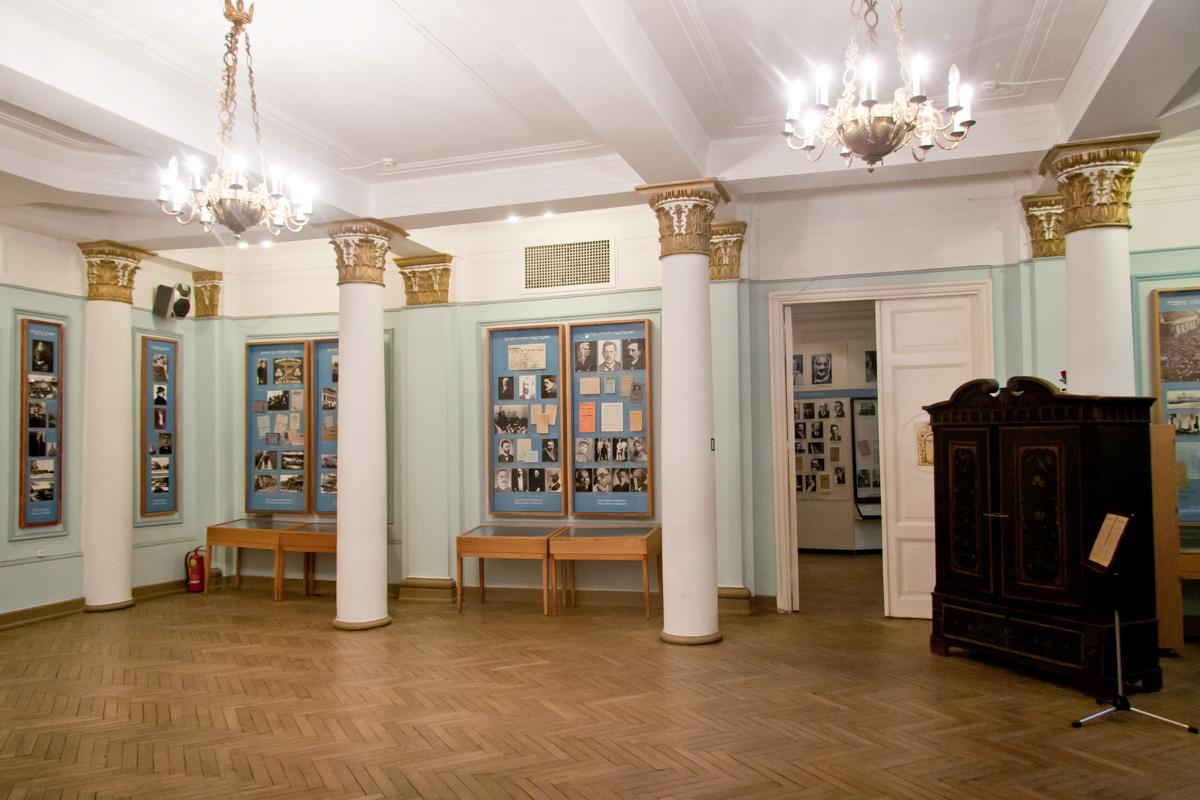
Exhibition in the museum "Jews in Latvia"

The museum's exhibition consists of three parts – Jews in Latvia until 1918, Jews in Latvia from 1918 to 1941, and Jews in Nazi-occupied Latvia. The exhibition opens with the period from the arrival of Jews on Latvian territory in the 16th century until the 19th century. The exhibition speaks about social, economic, political, intellectual and religious life, the legal status of Jews as well as their participation in various historical events in Latvia. The third hall is devoted to the tragic events of the Holocaust on Latvian territory. A special chapter is devoted to the honourable deeds of those Latvian citizens who rescued Jews from nearly complete extermination.

The French film maker Philippe Labrune saw a photograph in the Jewish Museum of four women and a girl, and began an investigation to out who the girl was. He discovered that she was Sorella Epstein, who had been murdered aged 10 in 1941, and a French documentary was made about the investigation, broadcast in France in 2015.

== Building ==
The museum is located in the building of the Riga Jewish community, a historical building which was once a Jewish club and theatre. It was built in the years 1913-1914 by the architects Edmund von Trompowsky and Paul Mandelstamm. Here in 1926 a Jewish theatre troupe started its performances, and thus the building was renovated. Various public organisations and a Jewish library were also located in this building. Jewish celebrations were often organised here– weddings, lectures, shows and meetings. During the German occupation of Latvia (1941-1944), a German officers' club was located here. During Soviet times the building served as a place of political education: various ideological events, as well as congresses of the Communist Party, were held there. The building was given back to the Jewish community in the early 1990s. Currently, the building is a state-protected architectural monument.

== The collection ==
The collection of the Jews in Latvia Museum is the foundation on which the museum bases its organisation of exhibitions and research. Currently, the museum has around 14,000 items. Of these items, more than 5,000 make up the main stock, which is included in the Latvian National collection of museums. The collection consists of documents, photos, books and objects. A collection of memoirs from the 19th-20th century, a plentiful collection of family photos and materials of various Jewish organisations in the interwar period are to be noted separately.

== See also ==
- History of the Jews in Latvia
