= Jānis Alksnis =

Latvian architect (1869–1939)

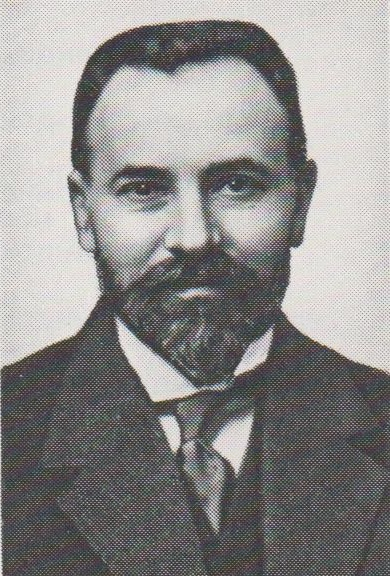
- Born: 7 December 1869; Taurene parish, Governorate of Livonia, Russian Empire (Now Vecpiebalga Municipality, Latvia).
- Died: 9 January 1939 (aged 69); Riga, Latvia
- Known for: architecture
- Movement: Art Nouveau
- Patrons: J. Krūmiņš

Jānis Alksnis (7 December 1869 – 9 January 1939) was a Latvian architect.

Alksnis was born in Taurene parish in Latvia. He was autodidact, and was granted a builder's license in 1901. He was then very active for a rather short period of time, coinciding with rapid economic growth in Riga. Between 1901 and the outbreak of World War I, he designed more than 130 private and public buildings in Riga, most of them in Art Nouveau style. He died in Riga.

== Biography ==
Jānis Alksnis was born in Taurene parish. After graduation of local parish school he started to work under his uncle J. Brauns who was a known Latvian builder. J. Alksnis has participated in the construction of several churches and society houses in Vidzeme. In the early 1890s Alksnis traveled to Riga where he was employed in construction works. However, during this period he started to show interest in art and architecture. He was often seen sketching facades of Riga old town buildings. He was spotted by Latvian civil engineer J. Krūmiņš who decided to support him. With his support Alksnis traveled to Germany where he studied in construction school in Konigsberg. In 1894 Alksnis together with engineer J. Krūmiņš traveled to Siberia where they worked on the construction of Trans-Siberian Railway line around lake Baikal. Jānis Alksnis returned to Riga in 1900. In 1901 he went to St. Petersburg to pass exam and receive building rights. Construction technical committee under Russian Ministry of Interior considered his apply for three months but finally he was granted license and permission to conduct civil and road construction works in the territory of Russian Empire. It gave rights to design buildings and to supervise construction works however he was not allowed to call himself architect or civil engineer. After that he opened his building office in Riga. After the First World War Jānis Alksnis unlike most of his colleagues was not actively involved in architecture. He died on January 9, 1939, in Riga. He was buried in Riga Forest Cemetery.

== Architecture ==
First his designed buildings are still stylistically closer to eclecticism but since 1904 all his buildings were designed in the Art Nouveau style. The overwhelming majority of work by Jānis Alksnis is distinguished for its high artistic value and emotional expression, and a great deal of his buildings belong to the most beautiful houses in the centre of Riga. He became one of the greatest masters of Perpendicular Art Nouveau which is one of the formal trends of Art Nouveau architecture of Riga. After 1910 he designed several big bank buildings in the Neo classical form of Art Nouveau.

== Gallery ==
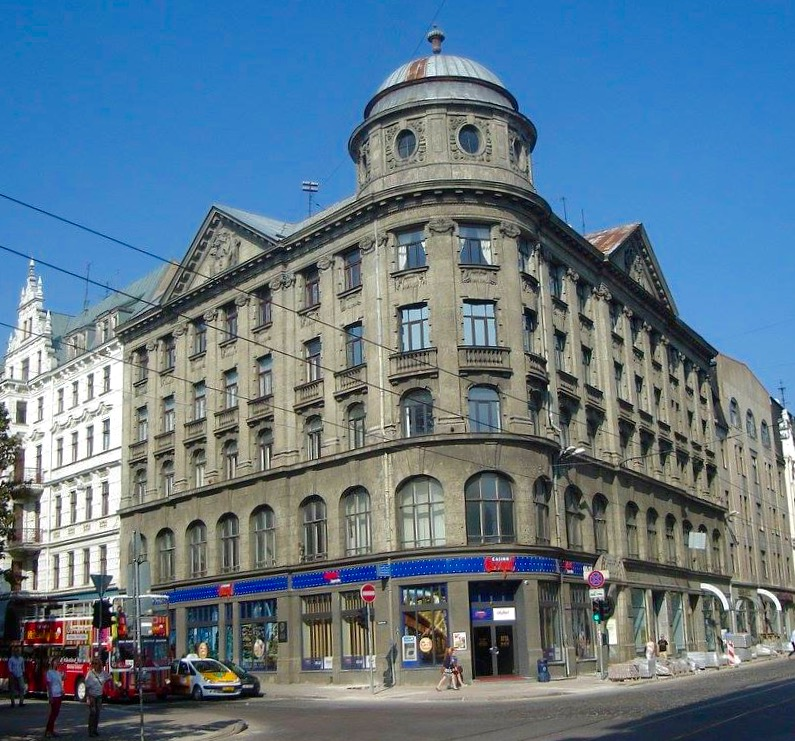
Former Latvian craftsman society savings bank building on Kr. Barona street 3, Riga (1911).

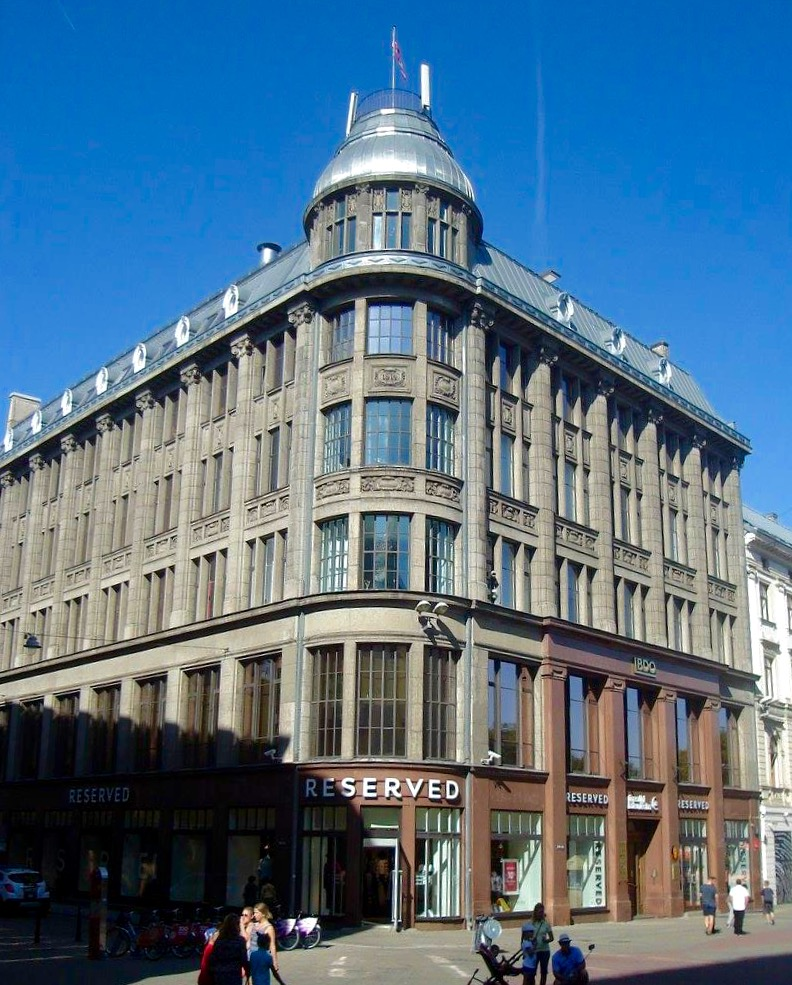
Former bank (now office) building on Kaļķu street 15, Riga (1913)

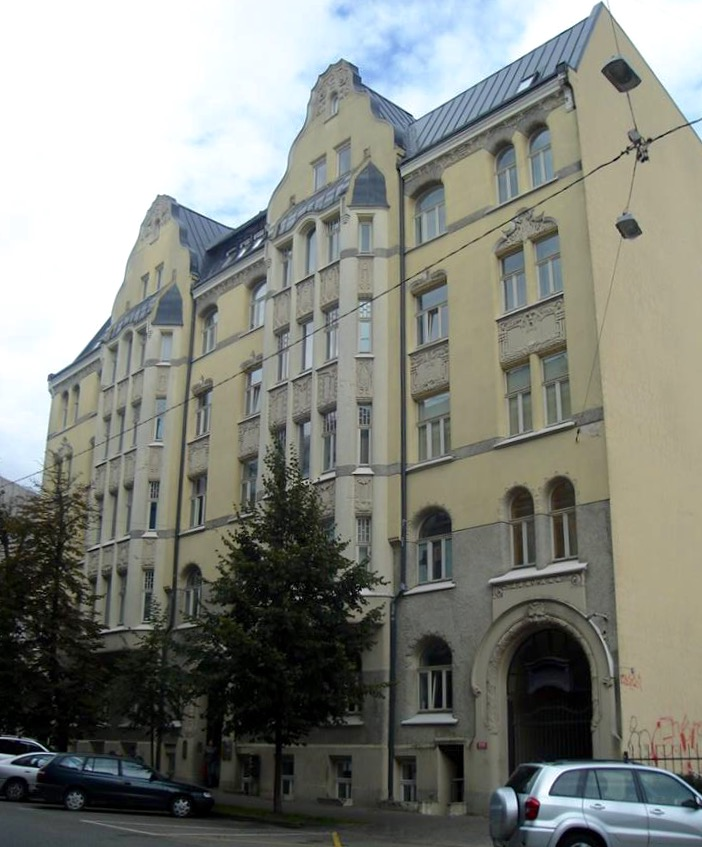
Residential building (owned by J. Alksnis, his residence and office was located there on Stabu street 19, Riga. (1908)

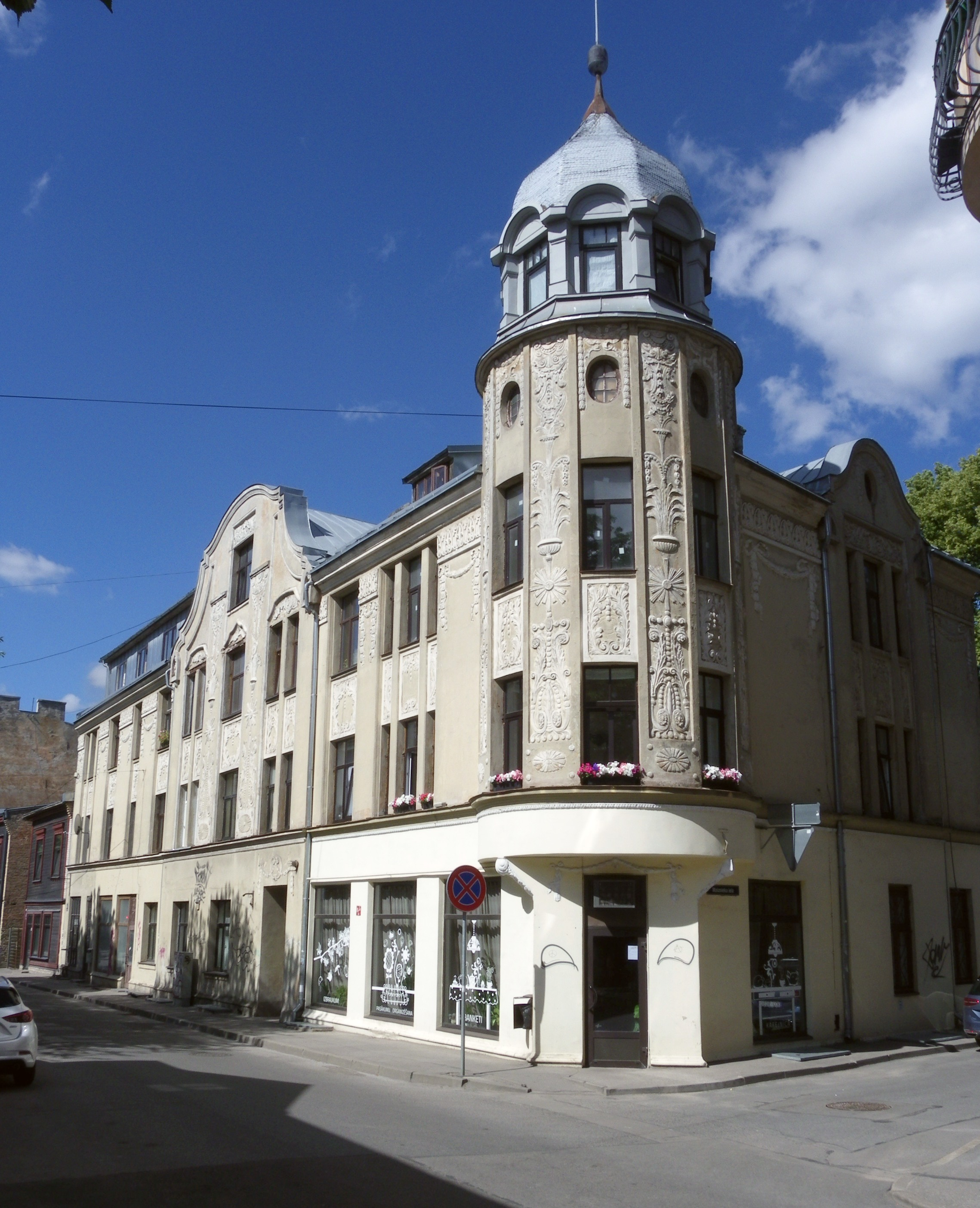
Residential building on Nometņu street 5, Riga. (1911)

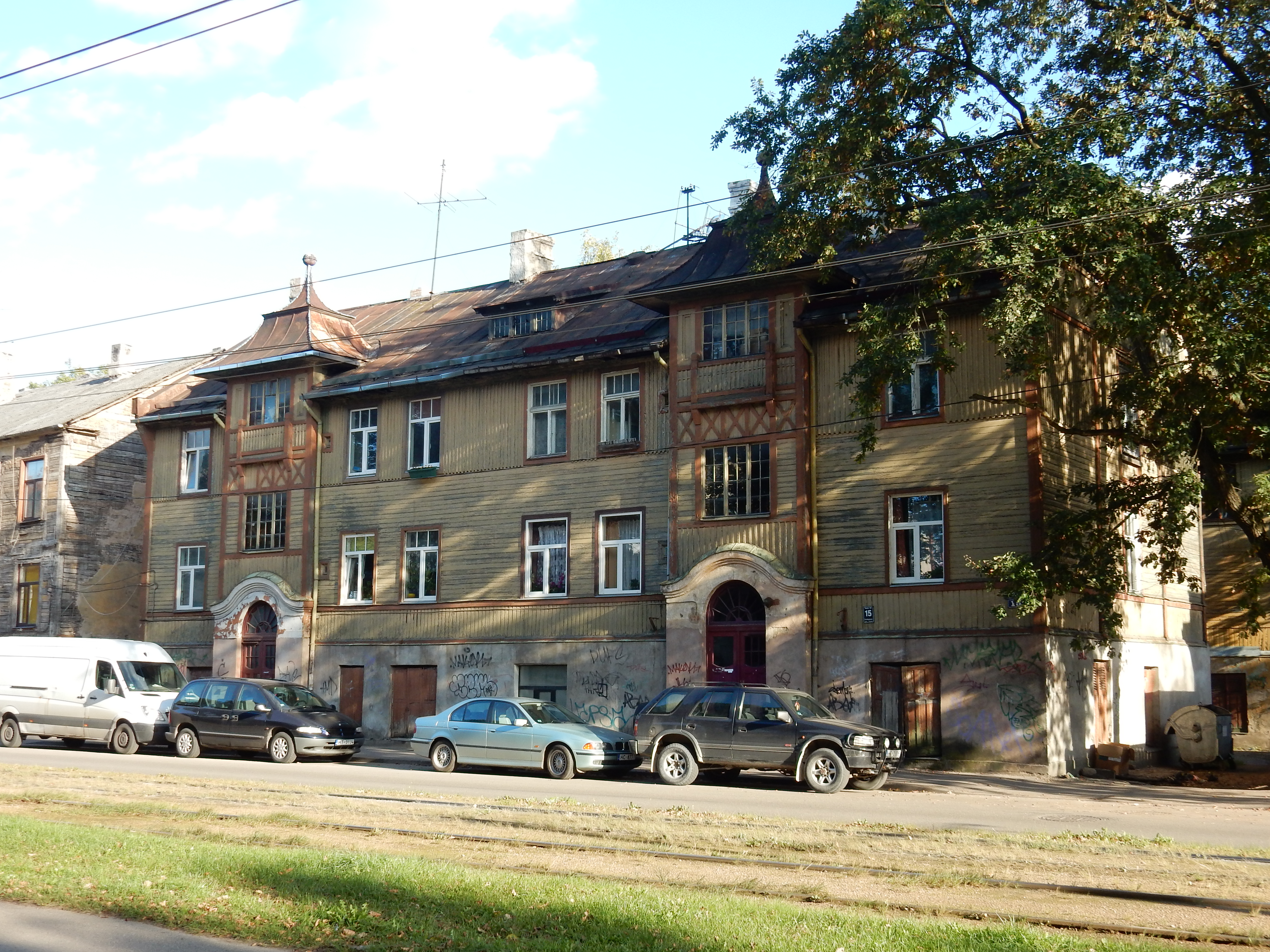
Residential building on Ropažu street 15, Riga. (1911)

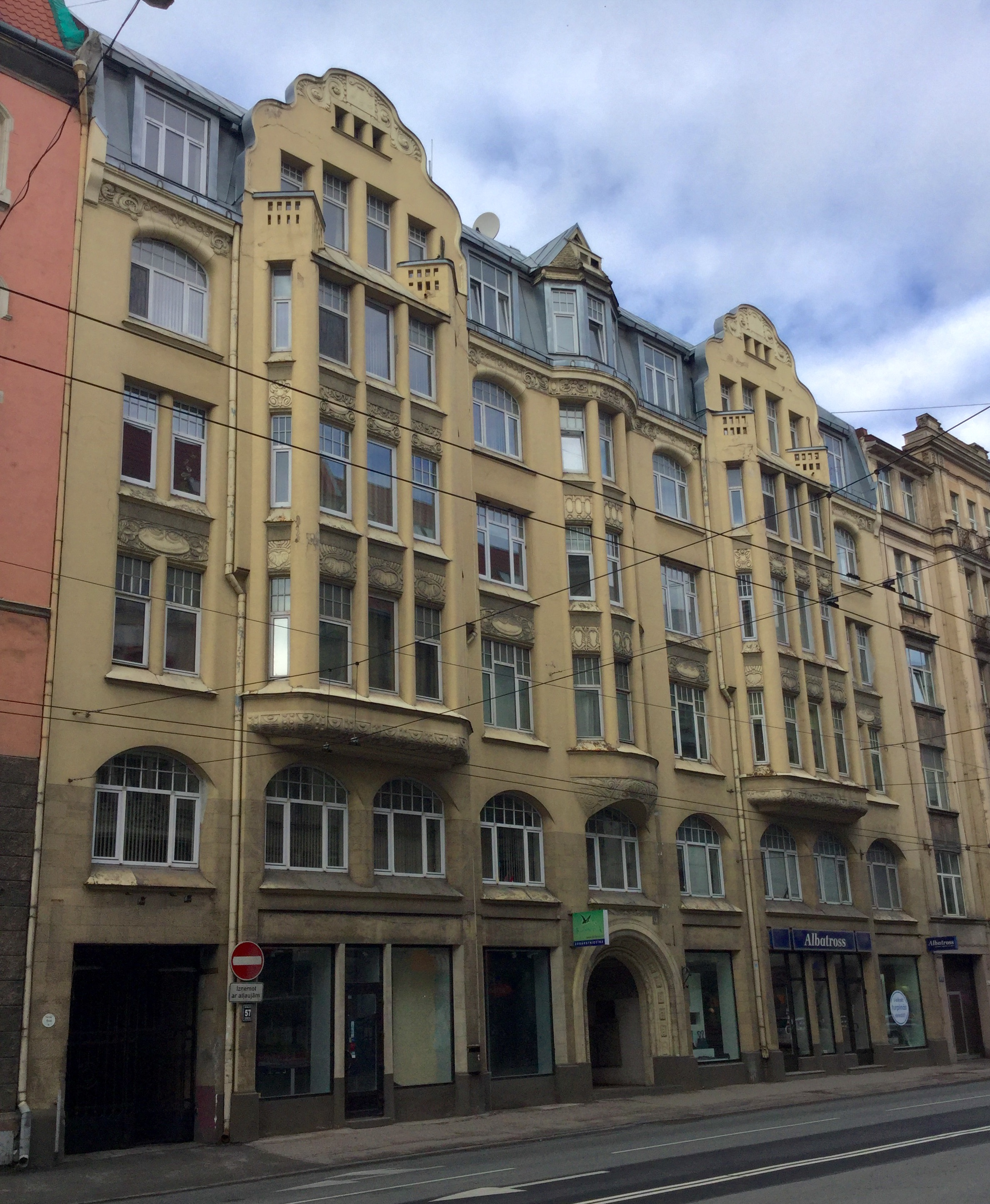
Residential building on Brīvības street 57, Riga. (1909)

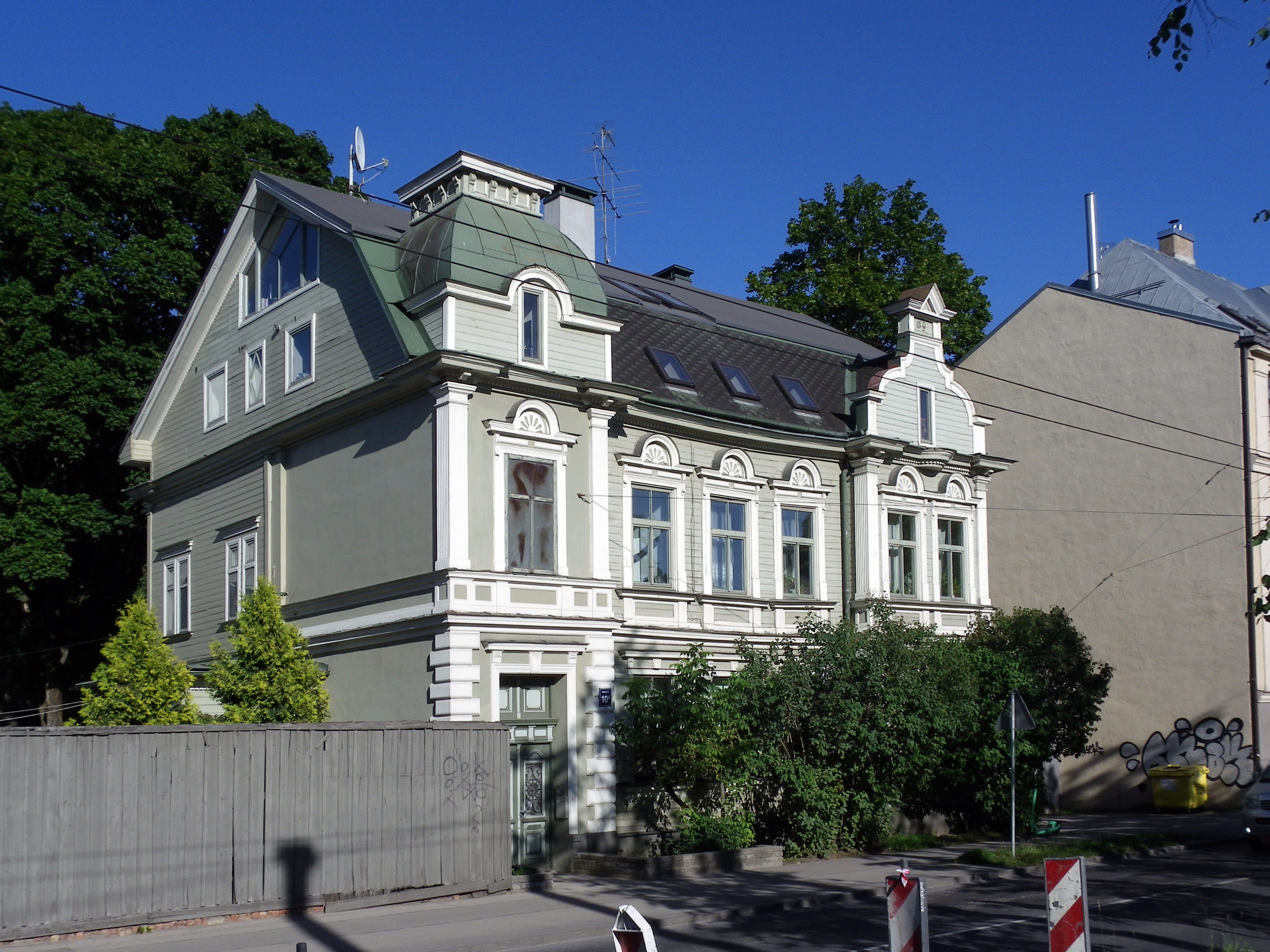
Residential building on Melnsila street 10A, Riga. (1906)

== See also ==
- Art Nouveau architecture in Riga
