= Rudolph Dohnberg =

Baltic German architect (1864–1918)

Rudolph Dohnberg (10 April 1864 – 17 August 1918) was a Baltic German architect.

Dohnberg was born in Riga, where he also lived and worked for the larger part of his life. He studied under Wilhelm Bockslaff and graduated from Riga Polytechnic Institute (present-day Riga Technical University) in 1893. From 1894, he was active as an architect in Riga. He designed over 80 multi-storey apartment buildings in the city, most in Art Nouveau style. He died in Kassel, Germany.

== Examples of buildings by Rudolph Dohnberg ==
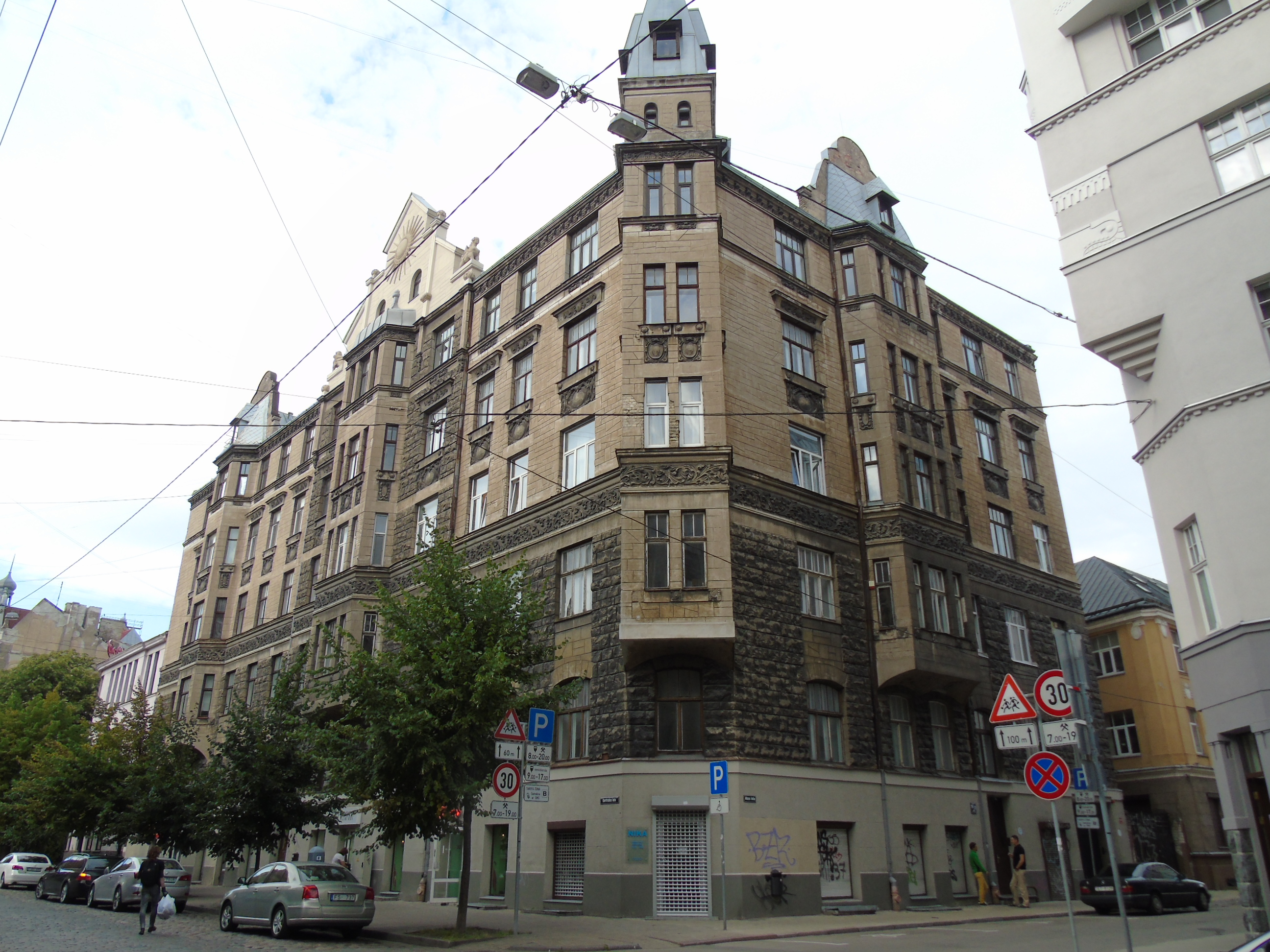
Building by Rudolph Dohnberg on Ģertrūdes iela 19/21, Riga

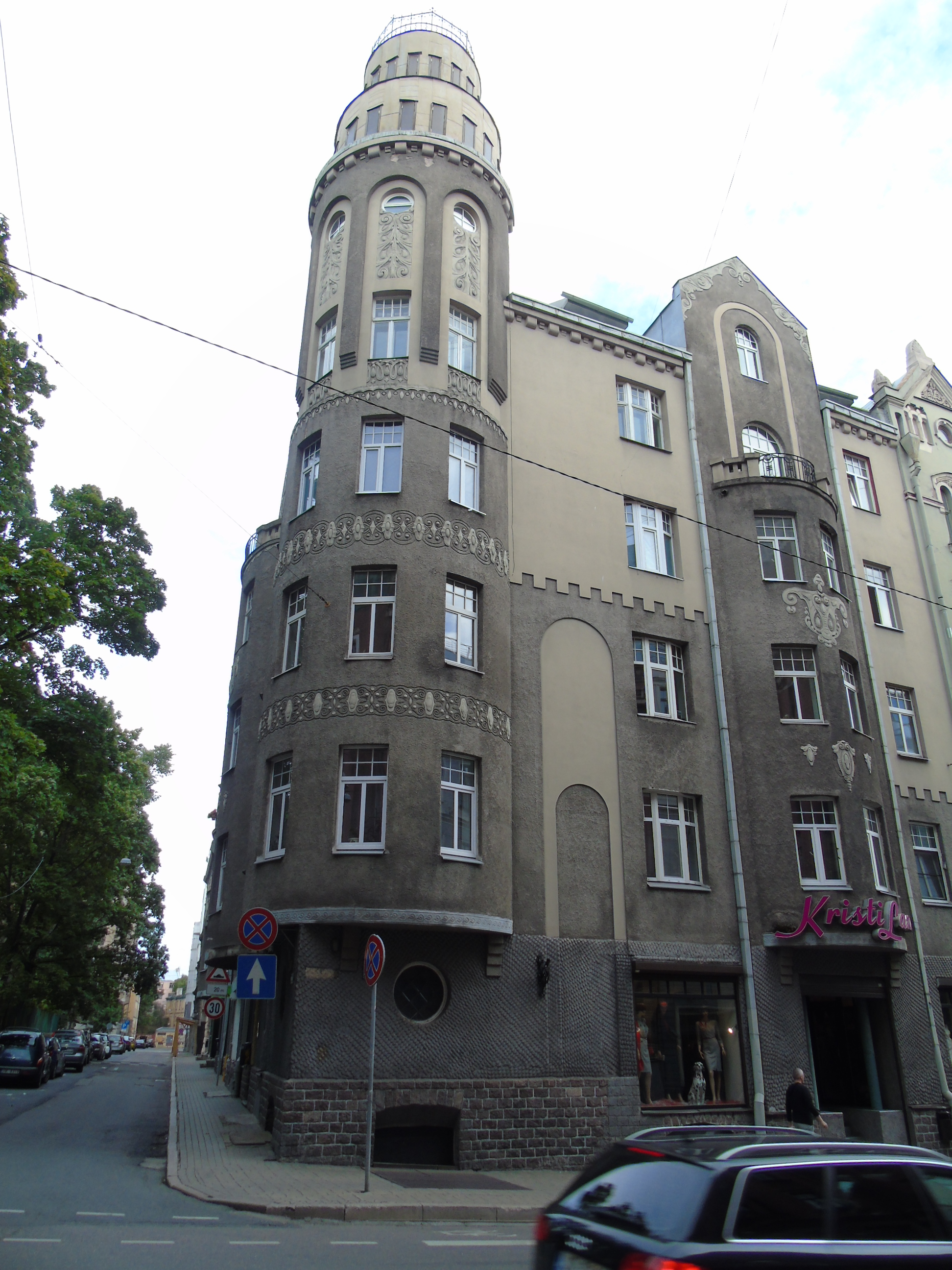
Building by Rudolph Dohnberg on Lāčplēša iela 21, Riga

Building by Rudolph Dohnberg on Lāčplēša iela 51, Riga

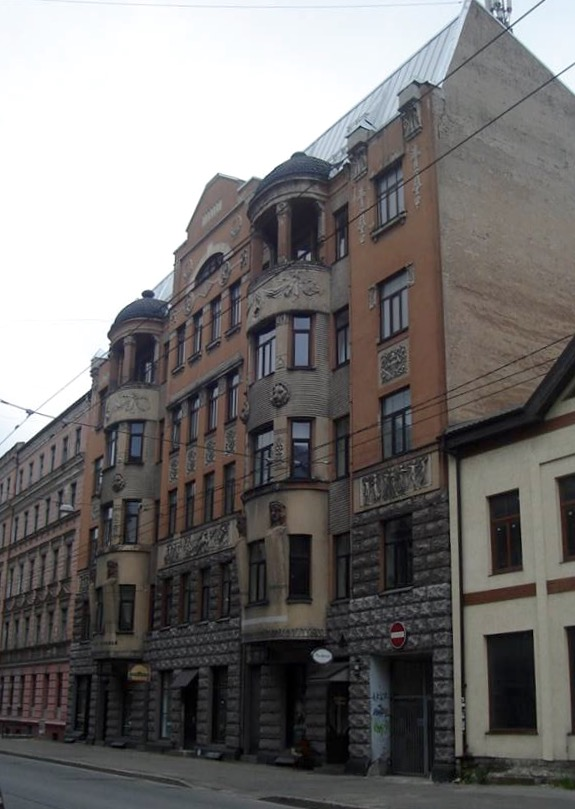
Building by Rudolph Dohnberg on Ģertrūdes iela 60, Riga

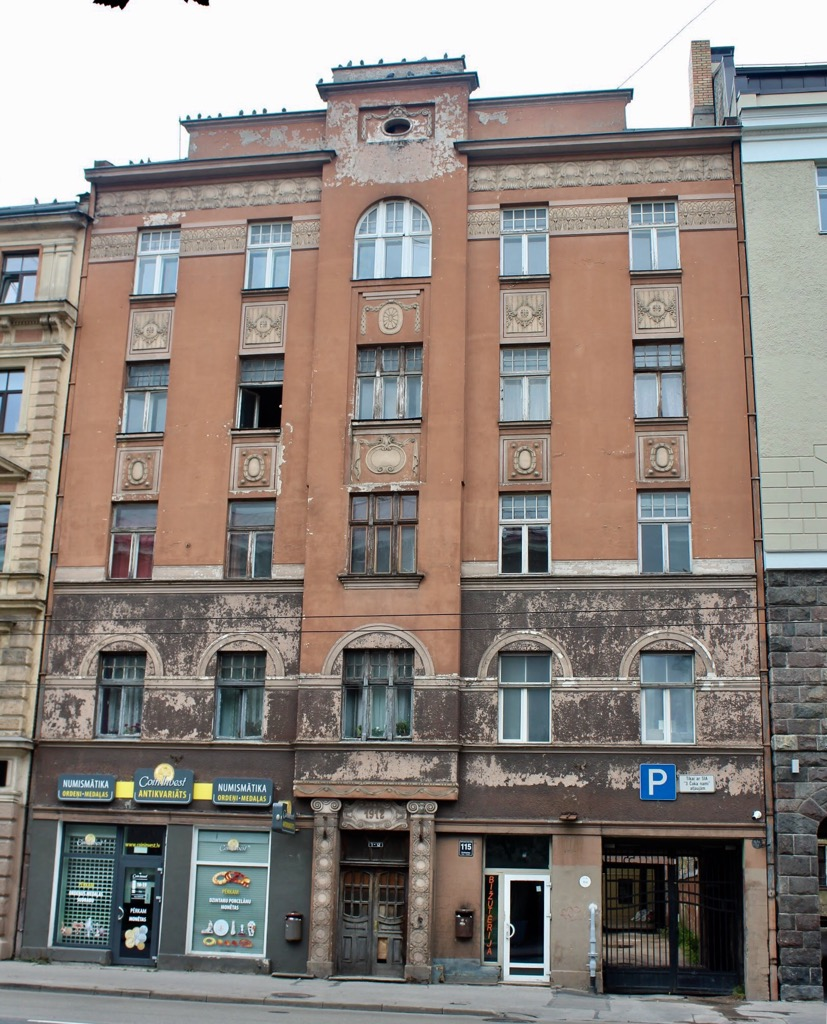
Building on A. Čaka street 115, Riga. (1911).

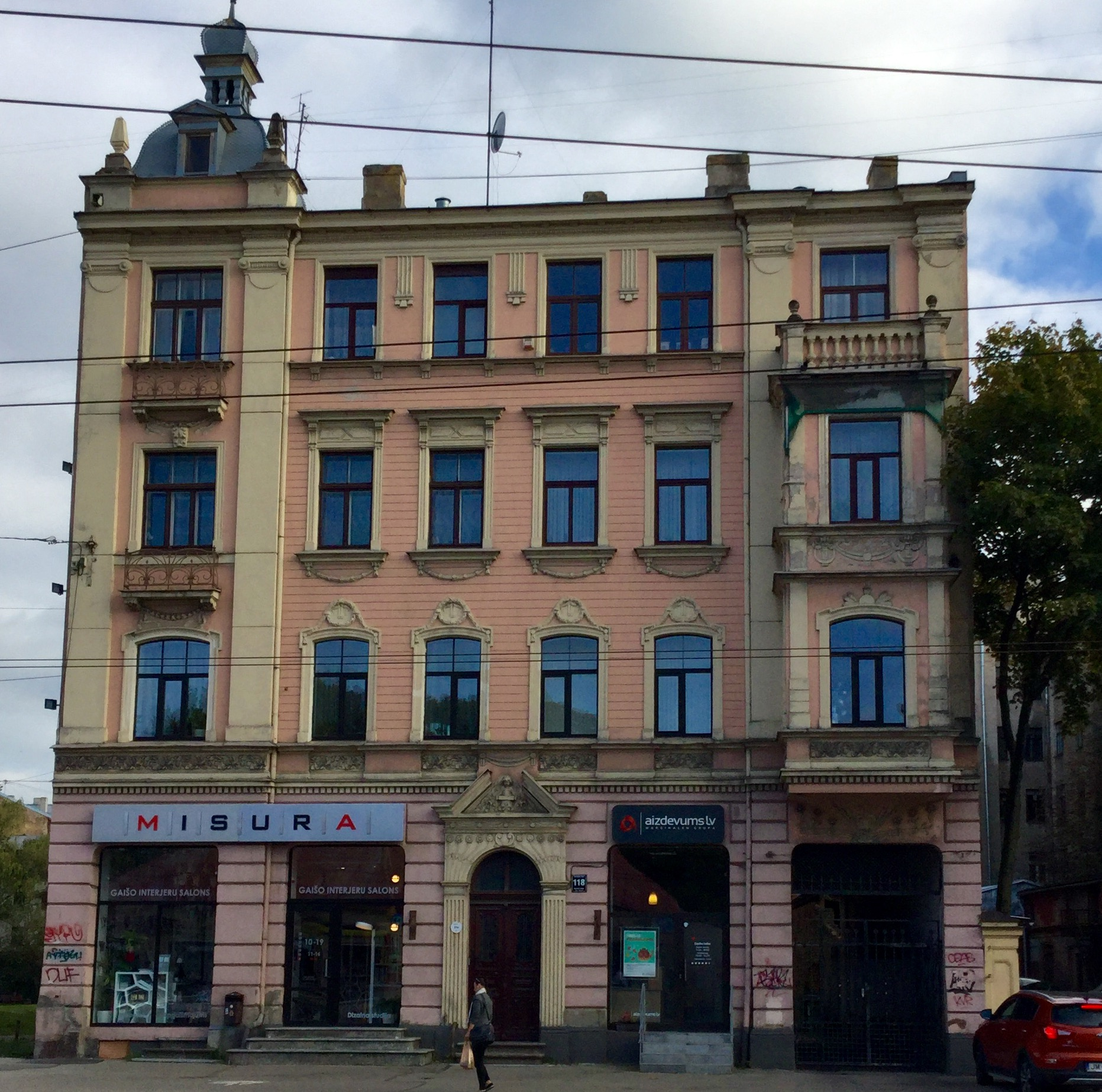
Building on Brīvības street 118, Riga. (1903)

== See also ==
- Art Nouveau architecture in Riga
