= Max Scherwinsky =

German architect (1859-1909)

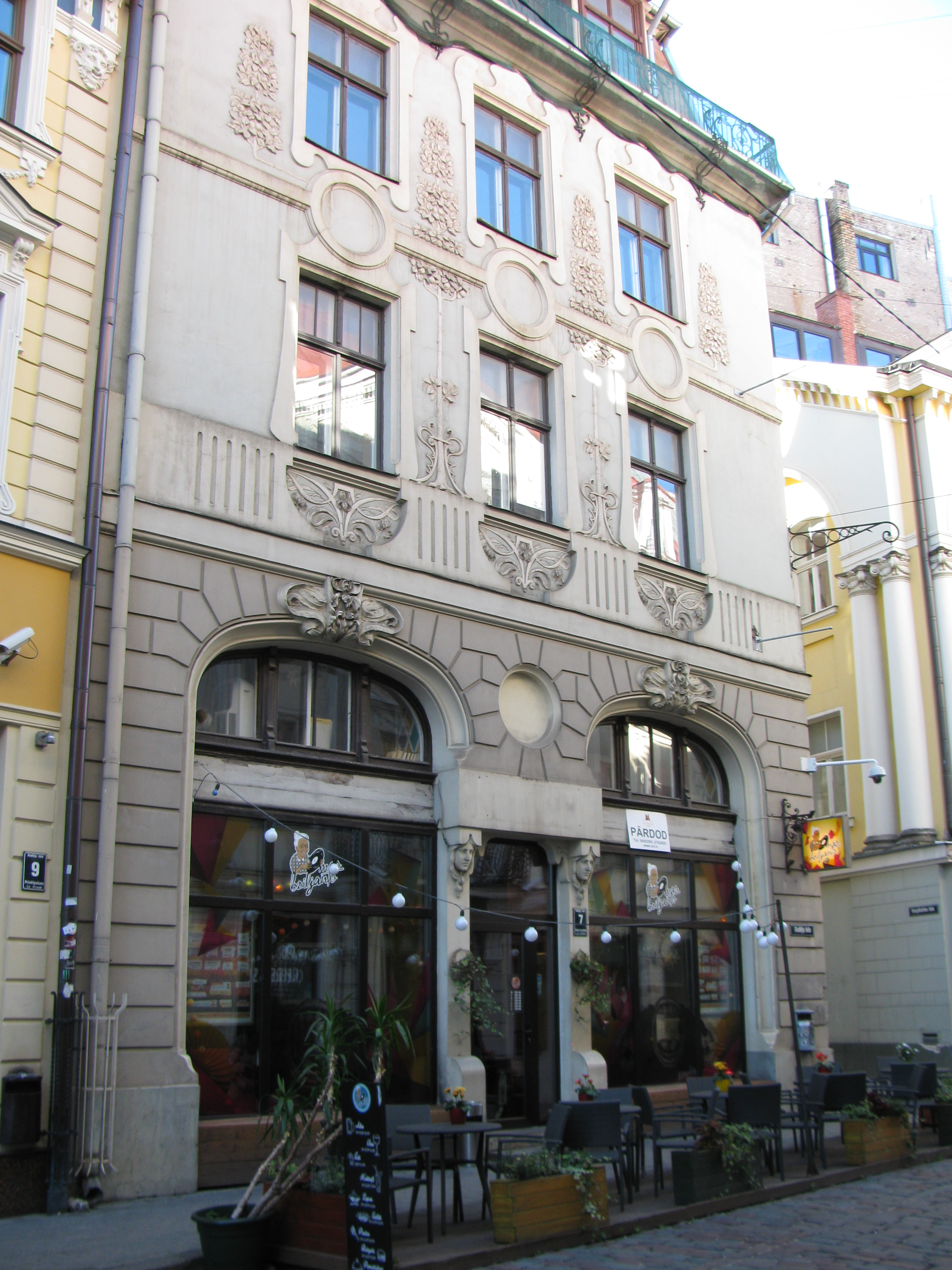
The building on Audēju iela 7, Riga's first Art Nouveau building, designed by Max Scherwinsky and Alfred Aschenkampff

Max Gustav Richard Scherwinsky (Latvian: Maksis Gustavs Rihards Šervinskis; 1 November 1859 – 12 July 1909) was a German-born architect working mainly in Riga, the present-day capital of Latvia.

== Biography ==
Max Scherwinsky was born in Tilsit (since 1946 Sovetsk) in East Prussia (today Kaliningrad Oblast in Russia). His family was originally Polish aristocrats who had emigrated to the Kingdom of Prussia following the November Uprising. Max Scherwinsky received his basic education in Tilsit and then went on to study construction in Buxtehude. In 1879 he enrolled in the Württemberg Royal Polytechnic School in Stuttgart to study architecture. He graduated in 1883. At some point after this he moved to Riga and took up teaching positions at the Riga School for Crafts, Riga Polytechnic Institute (today Riga Technical University), as well as Riga Lomonosov Girls' Gymnasium. From 1887 or 1888 he was the director of the School of Crafts. He was also active as a designer and architect in Riga. He died in Stockholm in 1909 while visiting an arts and crafts exhibition in the city.

== Work as a teacher and designer ==
As a teacher Scherwinsky wrote textbooks on craft design and also participated himself in design competitions and exhibitions, winning bronze medal at a craft exhibition in Riga in 1883 and a silver medal at the All-Russia Exhibition 1896 in Nizhny Novgorod. Among his pupils were the artists Janis Rozentāls and Vilhelms Purvītis. He was an appreciated teacher and received several gifts from his students on his 25th anniversary as a teacher; after his death his students also financed the repatriation of his remains to Riga and his gravestone with a commemorative inscription.

== Architecture ==
Scherwinsky was also active as an independent architect in Riga. In 1899 he designed, together with Alfred Aschenkampff, the first house in Art Nouveau style in the city (a style which would become very popular in Riga). The two architects also designed the main layout of Riga Anniversary Exhibition of 1901.

== See also ==
- Art Nouveau architecture in Riga
