= Cat House, Riga =

Building in Riga, Latvia

Coordinates: 56°57′0.67″N 24°6′30.33″E

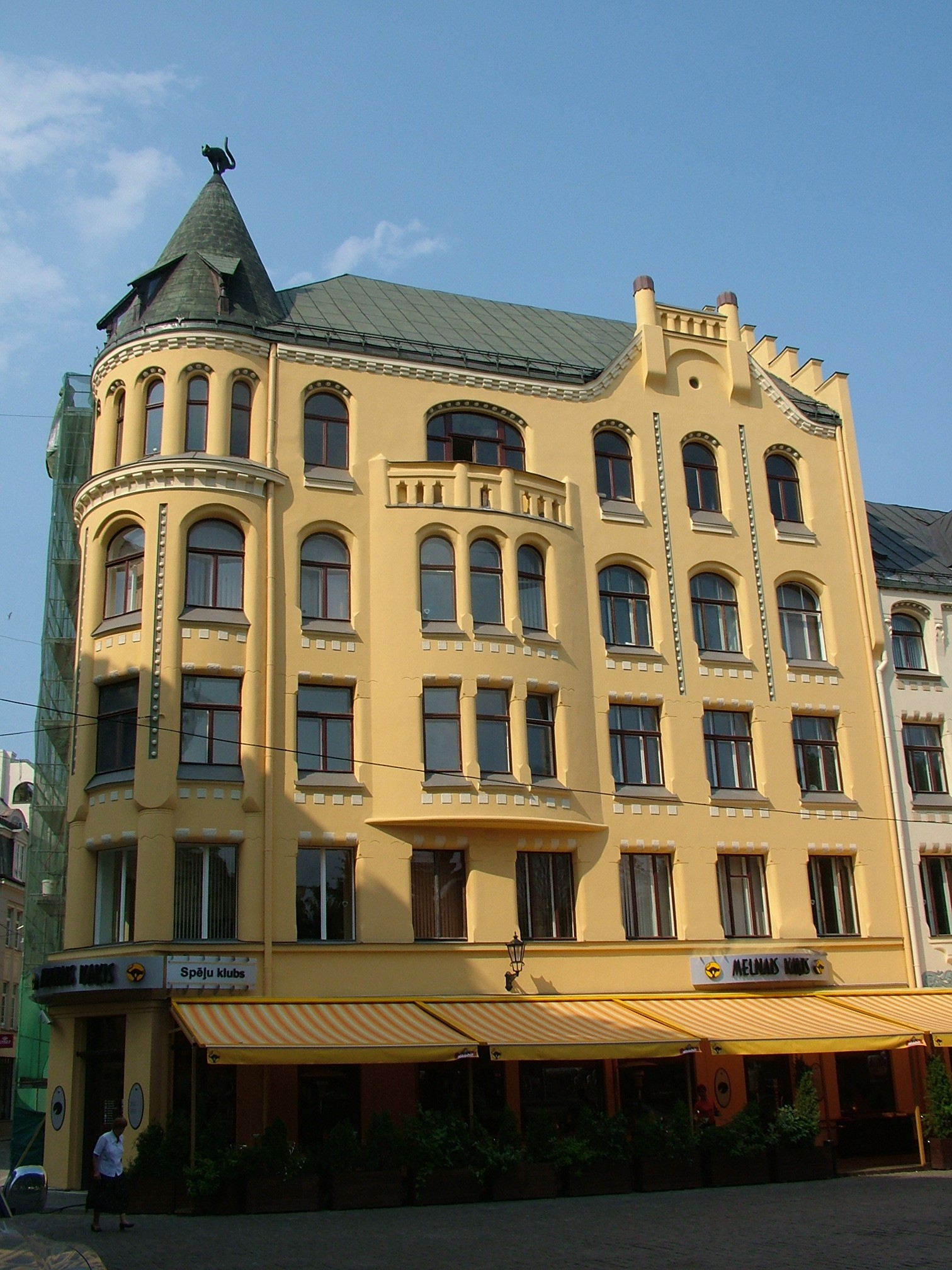
The Cat House seen from the south

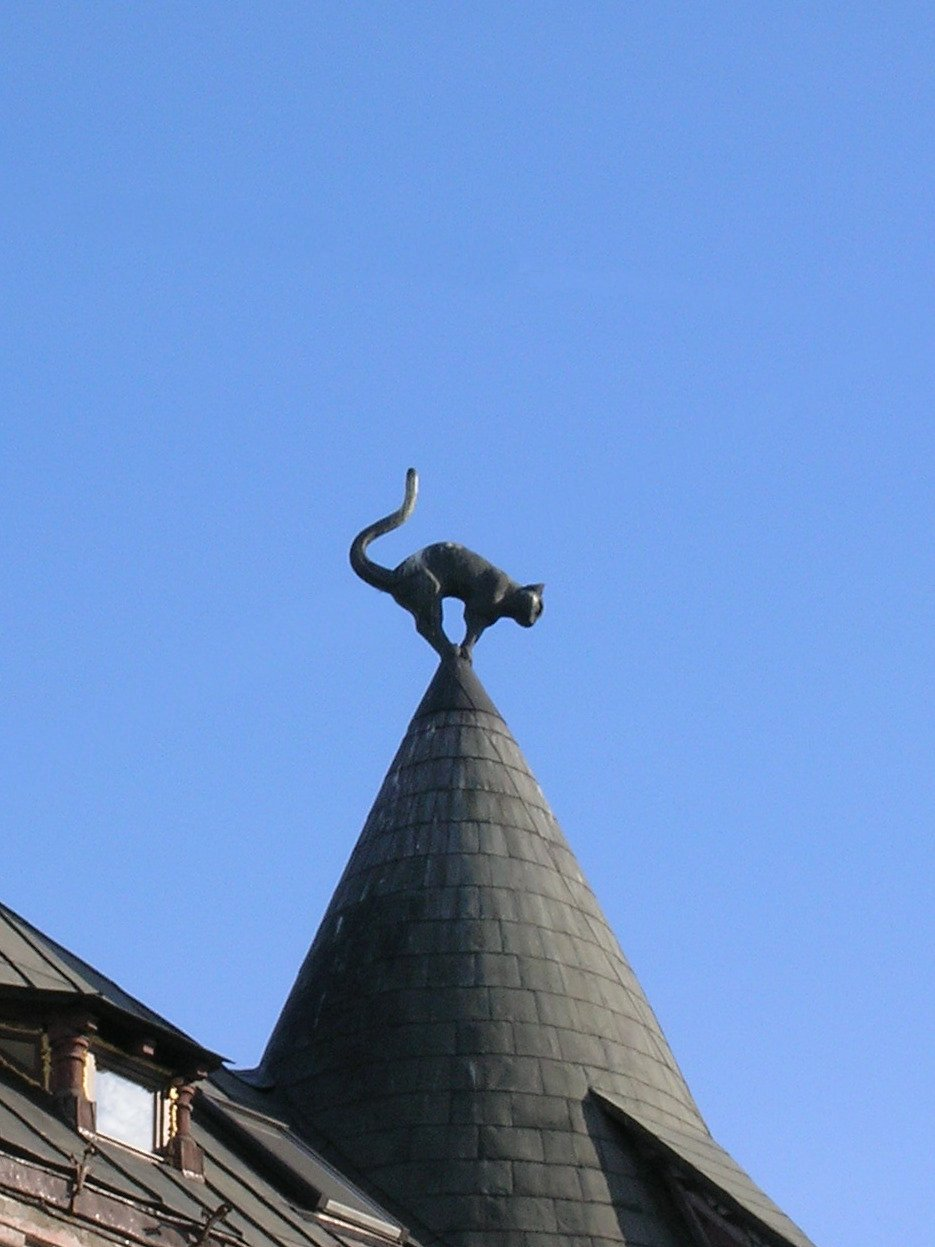
Angry-looking cat on turret rooftop

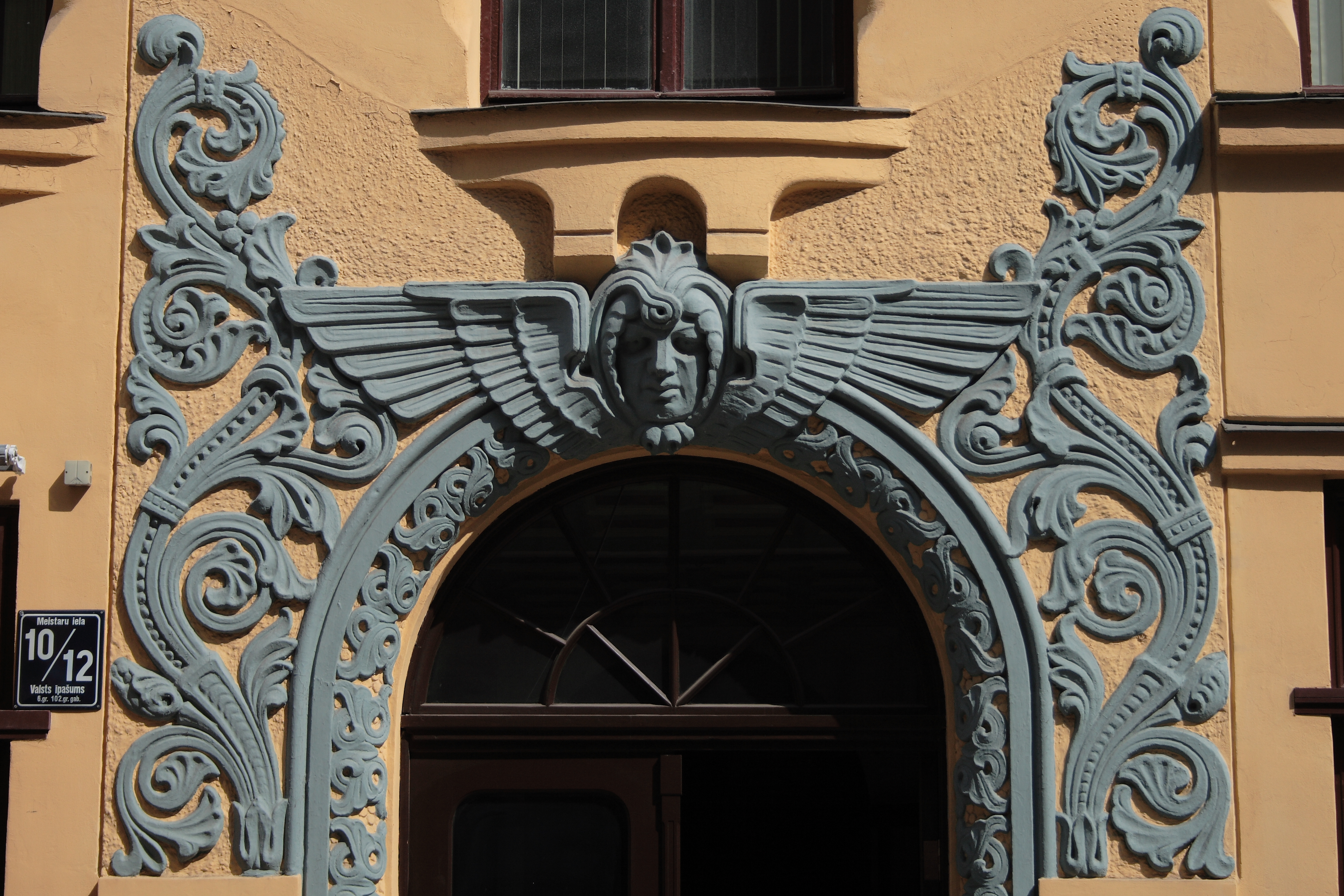
Cat House main entrance with Art Nouveau decorations

The Cat House (Latvian: Kaķu nams) is a building situated at 10 Meistaru iela in the old town of Riga, the capital of Latvia. It was built in 1909 according to the blueprint of architect Friedrich Scheffel. The building is styled as medieval architecture with some elements of Art Nouveau. It is known for the two cat sculptures, with arched backs and raised tails, on its roof. It is said that the owner of the house wanted the cats to be placed with their tails turned towards the house of the Great Guild, which is nearby, as he held a grudge against its members. It was later ordered that the cats should be turned so as to face the guildhouse.

== Legend of the cats ==
The legend known by most Rigans, which is also told to tourists, comes in at least two versions. One version of the legend has it that the wealthy tradesman who commissioned the building was refused membership of the Riga Tradesmen's Guild, mostly just called the Great Guild. The central element of both versions is the anecdote that seeking retribution the tradesman had two copper statues of angry-looking cats with arched backs and raised tails placed on the turret rooftops with their tails turned towards the house of the Great Guild, situated across the street.

The other and perhaps older version of the cat legend has it that the wealthy tradesman placed the two statues of angry-looking cats on the building turret rooftops with their tails towards the Riga Town Hall, following a dispute with Riga City Council, after which he encouraged the erection of the building. The Riga Town Hall at the time was in the same direction as the Great Guild, but it burned down during World War II, was demolished in 1954 and only rebuilt in the very same place between 2000 and 2001.

== See also ==
- Art Nouveau architecture in Riga
