= Art Nouveau architecture in Riga =

Architectural style in Riga

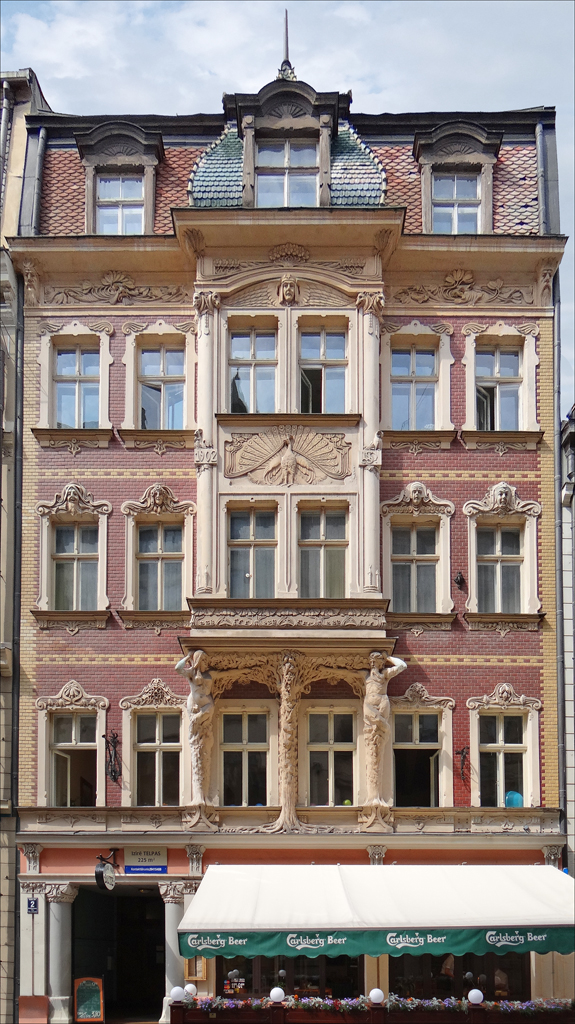
A good example of Riga's Art Nouveau architecture in its combination of rationality and decoration is this 1902 building on Smilšu iela 2 by Konstantīns Pēkšēns.

Art Nouveau architecture in Riga is a prominent part of the architectural heritage of Riga, the capital of Latvia. Buildings that can be broadly characterised as Art Nouveau in style make up roughly one third of all the buildings in the central parts of the city. Built during a period of rapid economic growth, most of Riga's Art Nouveau buildings date from between 1904 and 1914. The style is most commonly represented in multi-storey apartment buildings. Stylistic influences derived not least from present-day Austria, Finland and Germany, while the establishment of a faculty of architecture in Riga in 1869 was instrumental in providing a local cadre of architects. This included some of the first formally trained ethnic Latvian architects. As elsewhere, the Art Nouveau movement in Riga was driven by a desire to express greater individuality, local attachment and a more rational kind of architecture than that which had dominated during the 19th century. Stylistically, the Art Nouveau architecture of Riga can be further divided into four different stages: Eclectic, Perpendicular, National Romantic, and Neo-Classical.

== Background ==
At the end of the 19th century, the old Hanseatic town and seaport of Riga was an important city in the Russian Empire which was enjoying a period of rapid economic, industrial and demographic development. Between 1897 and 1913, the city grew by 88%, reaching a population of 530,000 in 1914 and making it the fifth largest city in the Russian Empire and the third largest in the Baltic region. Its growth rate during this period was the highest the city had ever experienced.

By the middle of the 19th century, the city had begun to expand beyond medieval Riga, which was once surrounded by gates and walls. These were demolished between 1857 and 1863, and replaced with a belt of boulevards and gardens. The expanding city possessed urban coherence, as it developed along a grid pattern, following strict building regulations (which stated, for example, that no house could be taller than six storeys or 21.3 metres, 70 ft). Between 1910 and 1913, 300 to 500 new buildings were built every year, mostly in the Art Nouveau style, and most of them outside the old town. Art Nouveau buildings were also built within the old town, and single-family homes were constructed in the suburb of Mežaparks. Riga's first Art Nouveau building, designed by the architects Alfred Aschenkampff and Max Scherwinsky and finished in 1899, lies on Audēju iela 7 (Audeju street) in the medieval part of the city, but the majority of Art Nouveau architecture in Riga can be found beyond the medieval city centre.

The owners, builders and architects of these houses came from a variety of different ethnic groups: among these were the first Latvians to receive formal training as architects. Architects working during this period in Riga included ethnic Latvians (among the most well represented being Eižens Laube, Konstantīns Pēkšēns and Jānis Alksnis), as well as architects from a Jewish background (Mikhail Eisenstein, Paul Mandelstamm) and Baltic Germans (such as Bernhard Bielenstein, Rudolph Dohnberg and Artur Moedlinger). During a time when Latvia was developing its national identity, a relatively small number of these architects were ethnic Latvians whose first language was Latvian, but they designed nearly 40% of all the buildings in Riga built in the first part of the 20th century. An increasing number of house owners were Latvian, rather than German- or Russian-speaking. Regardless of their ethnicity, most of the Art Nouveau architects of Riga were locals, although they were stylistically influenced by foreign architecture, in particular from Germany, Austria and Finland. A significant development was the opening of the Faculty of Architecture at the Riga Polytechnic Institute (now the Riga Technical University) in 1869, which helped educate a new generation of local architects.

Some of the decorative details for these buildings, such as sculptures, stained glass and majolica stoves, were made locally by companies in Riga. Local decorative arts companies produced items for both their regional market and the Russian Empire, reaching destinations such as Tallinn and Saint Petersburg.

Today, Art Nouveau architecture accounts for one third of all the buildings in the centre of Riga, which according to historian Jānis Krastiņš makes it the city with the highest concentration of such buildings anywhere in the world. The style is most commonly represented in multi-storey apartment blocks.

== Development ==
Art Nouveau developed from, but was also as a reaction against, Eclecticism and different Revivalist styles. Like Art Nouveau elsewhere, its development was driven by a desire to create an individualistic style less dependent on obvious historical references, a wish to express local traits and traditions, and a move towards a rational architecture based on an 'honest' use of materials and ornamentation which complements the structural layout of the building.

Stylistically, the Art Nouveau architecture of Riga may be divided into four main categories: Eclectic or Decorative; Perpendicular or Vertical; National Romantic and Neo-Classical. These categorisations are not always mutually exclusive: many buildings are a combination of a number of different styles.

=== Eclectic Art Nouveau ===
The earliest Art Nouveau buildings in Riga were of the Eclectic Art Nouveau style. Beginning as a purely decorative change from Eclecticism, buildings of this type simply adopted new forms of Art Nouveau decoration in lieu of earlier styles, but did little or nothing to change earlier concepts of the structure of buildings. Eclectic Art Nouveau still displays the rhythmic façades and opulent decoration, often directly inspired by historical styles, of earlier architecture. Conversely, buildings that were essentially still Historicist occasionally adopted Art Nouveau decorative elements. In this early form of Art Nouveau, foreign influence was quite strong, especially from Germany, as were influences from contemporary Symbolism. Towards the end of the period, floral and other nature-inspired elements of decoration became popular. The arguably most famous Art Nouveau houses in Riga, a row of houses along Alberta iela (Albert Street), many to the design of Mikhail Eisenstein, are of this style. Though a major tourist attraction, they are not representative of the vast majority of Art Nouveau buildings in Riga.

=== Perpendicular Art Nouveau ===
Around c. 1905, eclecticism eventually gave way to a more rationalist style of Art Nouveau in Riga, characterised by marked vertical compositions of the facades, and geometrical ornaments integrated into the overall architectural composition. The structure of the buildings also shifted into an essentially modern quality, where the exterior reflects the layout of the interior, rather than being a facade without any rational connection with the structural layout of the building, as was the case earlier. Asymmetrical facades became more common. More attention was given to the choice of materials, and the decor more highly stylised. Several department stores were built in this style, and it is sometimes also referred to as "department store style" or Warenhausstil in German. About a third of the Art Nouveau buildings of Riga were built according to these ideals. The centrally located multi-storey building on Krišjāņa Valdemāra iela (Krišjānis Valdemārs Street) number 37, designed by Eižens Laube and built in 1912, is a representative albeit somewhat late example of this phase in the development of Art Nouveau architecture of Riga.

=== National Romantic Art Nouveau ===
The Latvian National Awakening, which began in the 19th century, together with political developments (especially the Revolution of 1905), initiated a process of conscious formulation of a specific Latvian identity, both politically and culturally through art and architecture, during the early 20th century. The National Romantic style is sometimes considered an architectural style in its own right, but in Latvian context often described as a variant of Art Nouveau. It was relatively short-lived and flourished between 1905 and 1911. A certain amount of influence came from Finnish architecture, but as the idea was to develop a specific Latvian form of architecture, many of its aspects are particular for Latvian architecture. It is a style characterised by restrained decoration inspired by local folk art, monumental volumes, and the use of natural building materials. The earlier sinuous forms, typical for much of Art Nouveau architecture, are less dominating but still present in many details. Approximately between one third and one fourth of every Art Nouveau building in Riga were built in this style. A prime example of this style, and of the architectural oeuvre of the prolific Rigan architect Eižens Laube, is the building on Alberta iela 11, built in 1908.

=== Neo-Classical Art Nouveau ===
The last stage of the development of Art Nouveau architecture in Riga is also the style least well represented, so-called Neo-Classical Art Nouveau. It can be interpreted as a reaction against the earlier, highly decorative forms of architecture. Drawing on the language of Classical architecture which had been a prolific style in the Russian Empire during the 19th century (but not common in Riga), this rather monumental variant of Art Nouveau was used in several new bank buildings. Purely Neo-Classical buildings from this time are still rare, however; often a classical basic layout was made to accommodate details and decorations that belonged firmly to the vocabulary of late Art Nouveau. A typically monumental example of such a building is the former Commercial Bank of Riga (today housing Latvijas Radio) on Doma laukums (Dome Square), opposite Riga Cathedral. It was designed by Paul Mandelstamm and built in 1913.

== Art Nouveau Museum ==
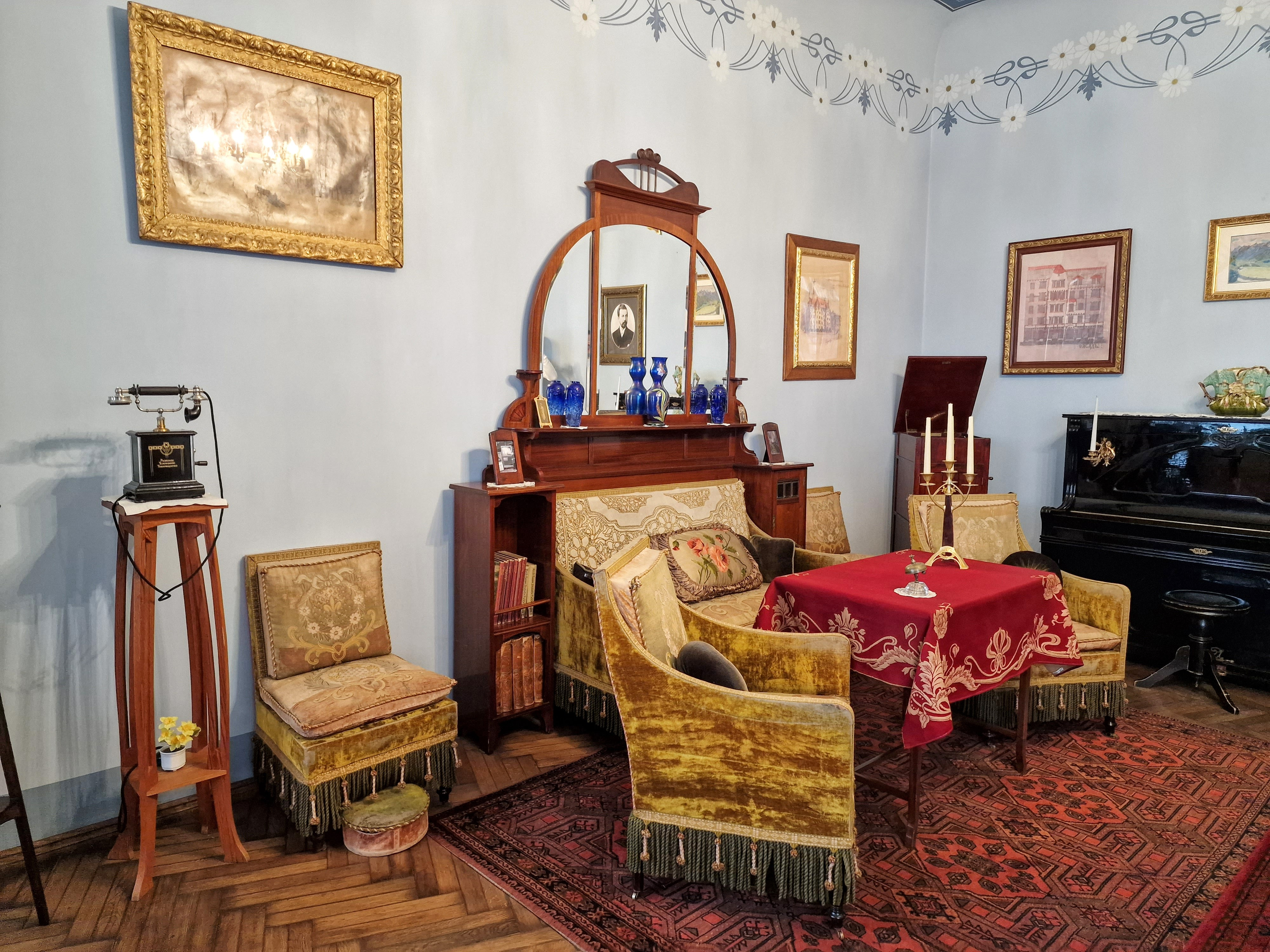
Interior of the Art Nouveau Museum

The Art Nouveau Museum in Riga is the only museum in the Baltics dedicated to the region's Art Nouveau heritage. The building is located in the former private home of Konstantīns Pēkšēns, a notable Latvian architect, and features modern digital exhibitions within the authentic interior of an Art Nouveau apartment. The museum first opened in 2009 and is a popular spot for visitors to Riga to see the city's artistic heritage. The Riga Jugendstila Centrs (Riga Art Nouveau Centre) is responsible for the Art Nouveau Museum in Riga and also maintains a database of Art Nouveau buildings in the city.

== Gallery ==
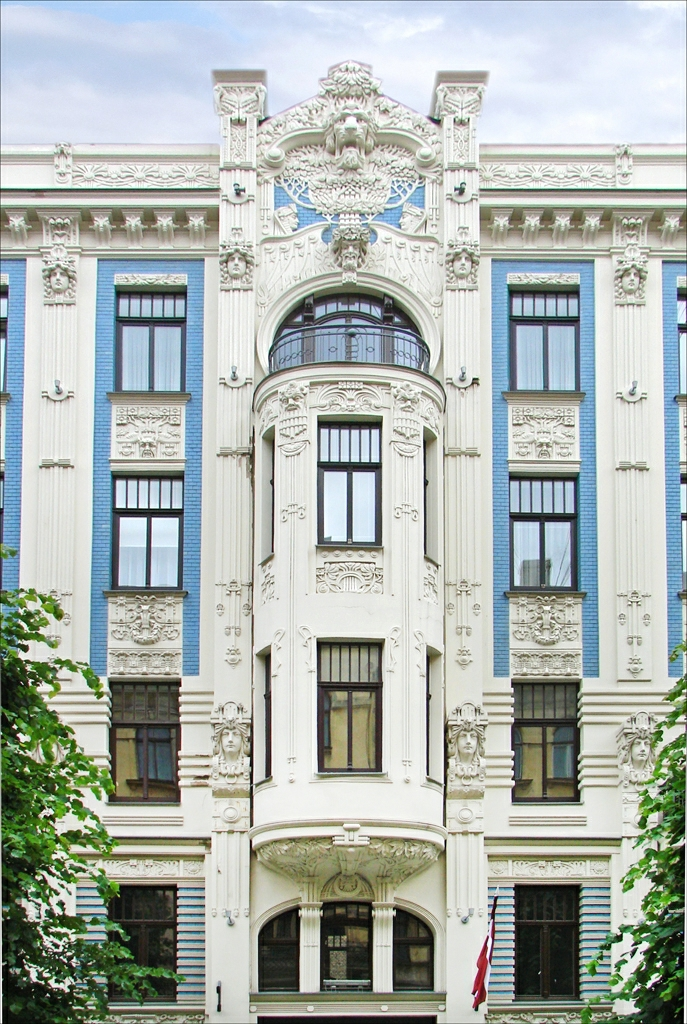
Eclectic Art Nouveau: A building on Alberta iela by Mikhail Eisenstein. Although a popular tourist destination, this very decorated kind of Art Nouveau is not typical for Riga.

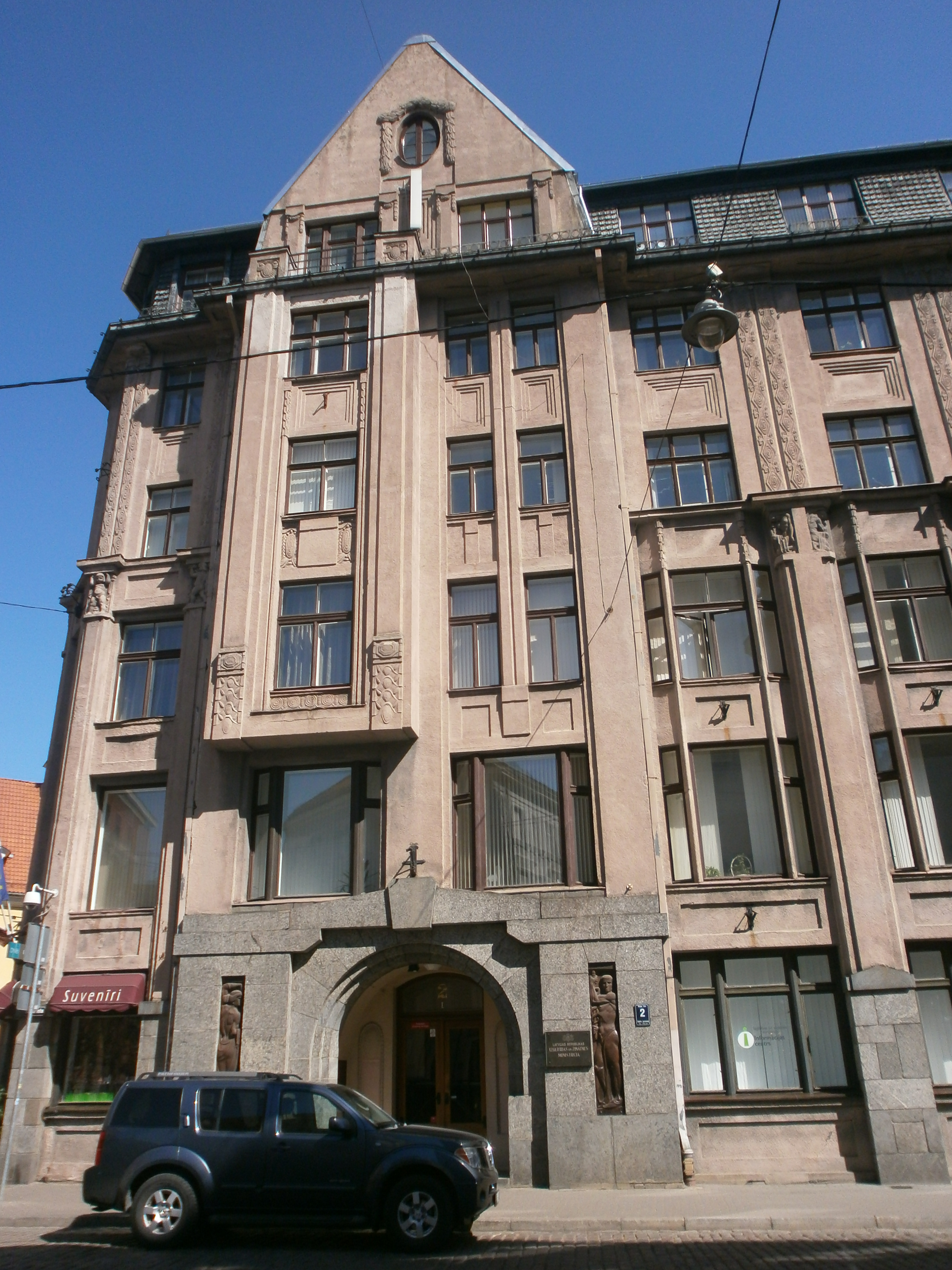
Perpendicular Art Nouveau: The present Ministry of Education, built in 1911 by architect Edgar Friesendorf, has a so-called perpendicular façade with sculptures by August Volz.

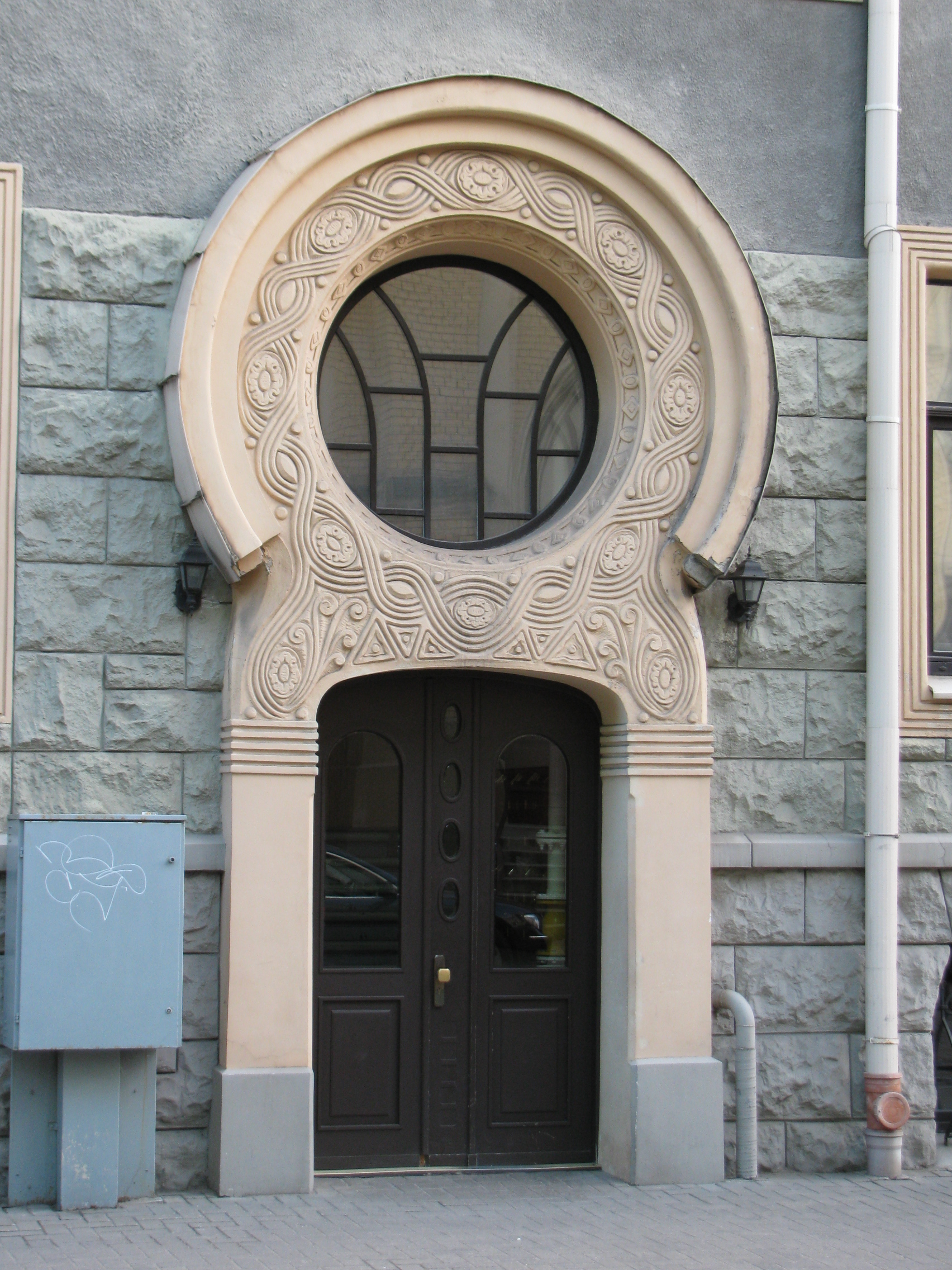
National Romantic Art Nouveau: Detail with typical National Romantic decoration on a house built in 1908 by Konstantīns Pēkšēns.

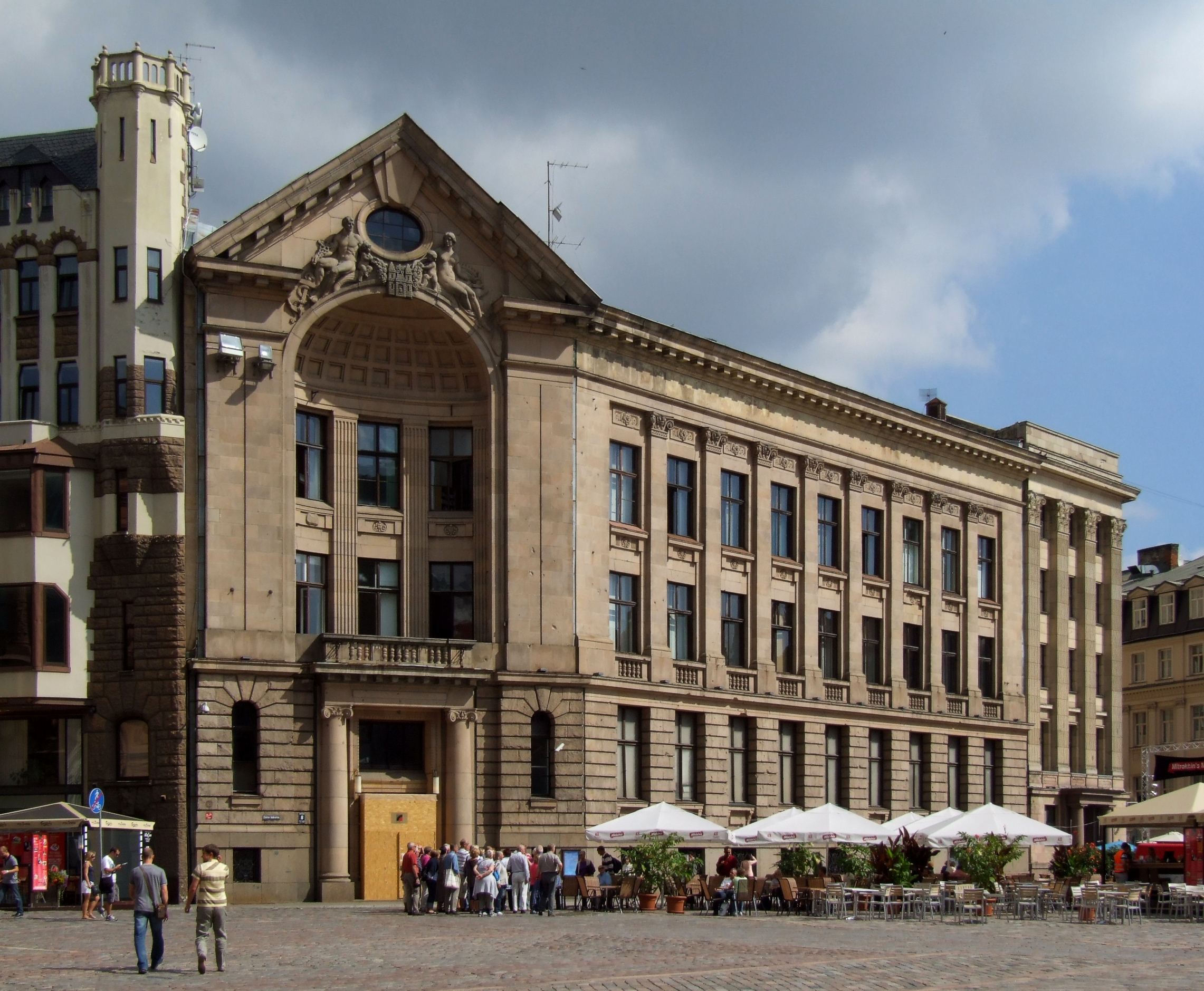
Neo-Classical Art Nouveau: Many buildings built for banks in Riga had Neo-Classical forms, such as this one, built in 1913 to designs by Paul Mandelstamm.

== See also ==
- Culture of Latvia
- Albert Street, Riga
- Cat House, Riga

== Bibliography ==
- Krastins, Janis (1996). Riga. Jugendstilmetropole. Art Nouveau Metropolis. Jugendstila Metropole. Riga: Baltika. ISBN 978-9984-9178-1-8.
- Grosa, Silvija (2003). Art Nouveau in Riga. Jumava. ISBN 978-9984-05-601-2.
- Rush, Solveiga (2003). Mikhail Eisenstein. Themes and symbols in Art Nouveau architecture of Riga 1901-1906. Neputns. ISBN 978-9984-729-31-2.
- Krastins, Janis; Strautmanis, Ivars (2004). Riga. The complete guide to architecture. Riga: Add Projekts. ISBN 978-9984-9687-0-4.
- Krastins, Janis (2006). "Architecture and Urban Development of Art Nouveau – Metropolis Riga". International Review of Sociology. 16 (2): 395–425. doi:10.1080/03906700600709327. S2CID 146754212.
- Tipane, Agrita (2010). "Motifs of Nature in Riga Art Nouveau Museum". Architecture & Urban Planning (4). Riga Technical University: 6–13.
- Krastins, Janis (2014). Art Nouveau buildings in Riga. Riga: Add Projekts. ISBN 978-9934-8318-2-9.
