= Edgar Friesendorf =

Baltic German architect

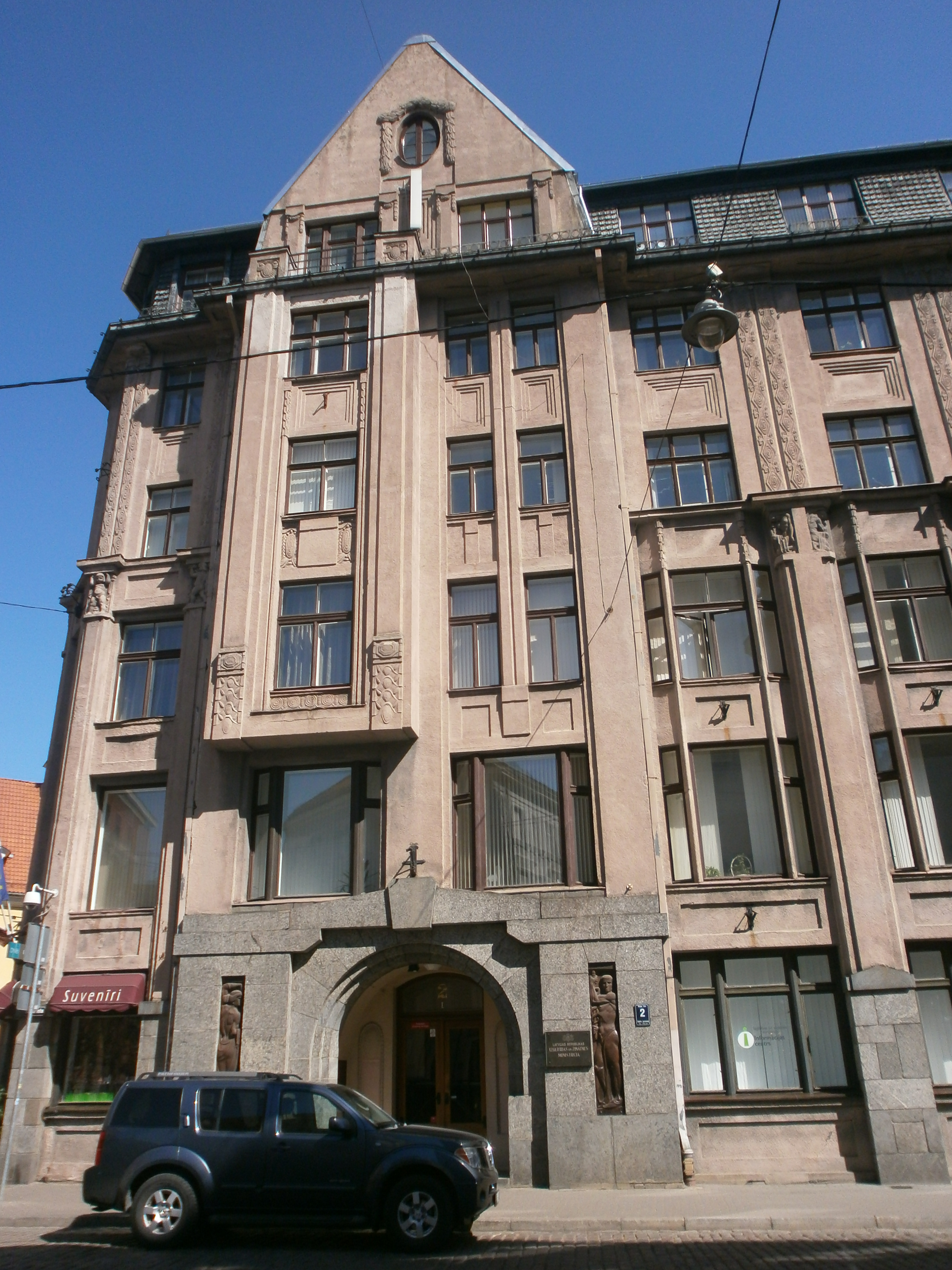
Building designed by Edgar Friesendorf in 1911, today housing the Ministry of Education and Science of Latvia, in Riga.

Edgar Woldemar Eduard Friesendorf (Latvian: Edgars Frīzendorfs, 17 April 1881 – 1945) was a Baltic German architect.

He was born in Riga and studied economincs and architecture, graduating from Riga Polytechnic Institute (predecessor of Riga Technical University) in 1907. The first years of his career (1907–1910) he worked at the firm of Wilhelm Bockslaff. For some time, he was serving as an architect at the Board of Vidzeme Province. After the Latvian War of Independence, he was employed by the Agrictultural Buildings Department of the Latvian Ministry of Agriculture, a position he held until 1935. In 1939, he moved to Germany as part of the German–Soviet population transfers. He died in 1945, in Poznań in present-day Poland. He was married to Helene Bergengruen. Approximately 25 residential buildings designed by him were built in Riga, in addition to public buildings, most of them in a perpendicular form of Art Nouveau the popular in Riga.
