= Alfred Aschenkampff =

Baltic German architect (1858–1914)

- Born: Emil Alfred Aschenkampff; 31 March 1858; Liepāja, Courland Governorate, Russian Empire
- Died: 26 December 1914 (aged 56); Riga, Russian Empire
- Known for: Architecture
- Movement: Art Nouveau

Emil Alfred Aschenkampff (31 March [O.S. 18 March] 1858 – 26 December [O.S. 13 December] 1914) was a Baltic German architect.

== Life ==
Aschenkampff was born in Libau (present-day Liepāja) and studied architecture at Riga Polytechnic Institute (today Riga Technical University). He graduated in 1893 and set up his own architectural firm in Riga. In addition, he taught at Riga Crafts school and worked as a building inspector for the city's building board. Together with Max Scherwinsky he designed the buildings of the exposition in 1901 to celebrate the 700th anniversary of the founding of Riga. He designed c. 15 multi-storey apartments in Riga, most in Art Nouveau style. He died in Riga.

== Gallery ==
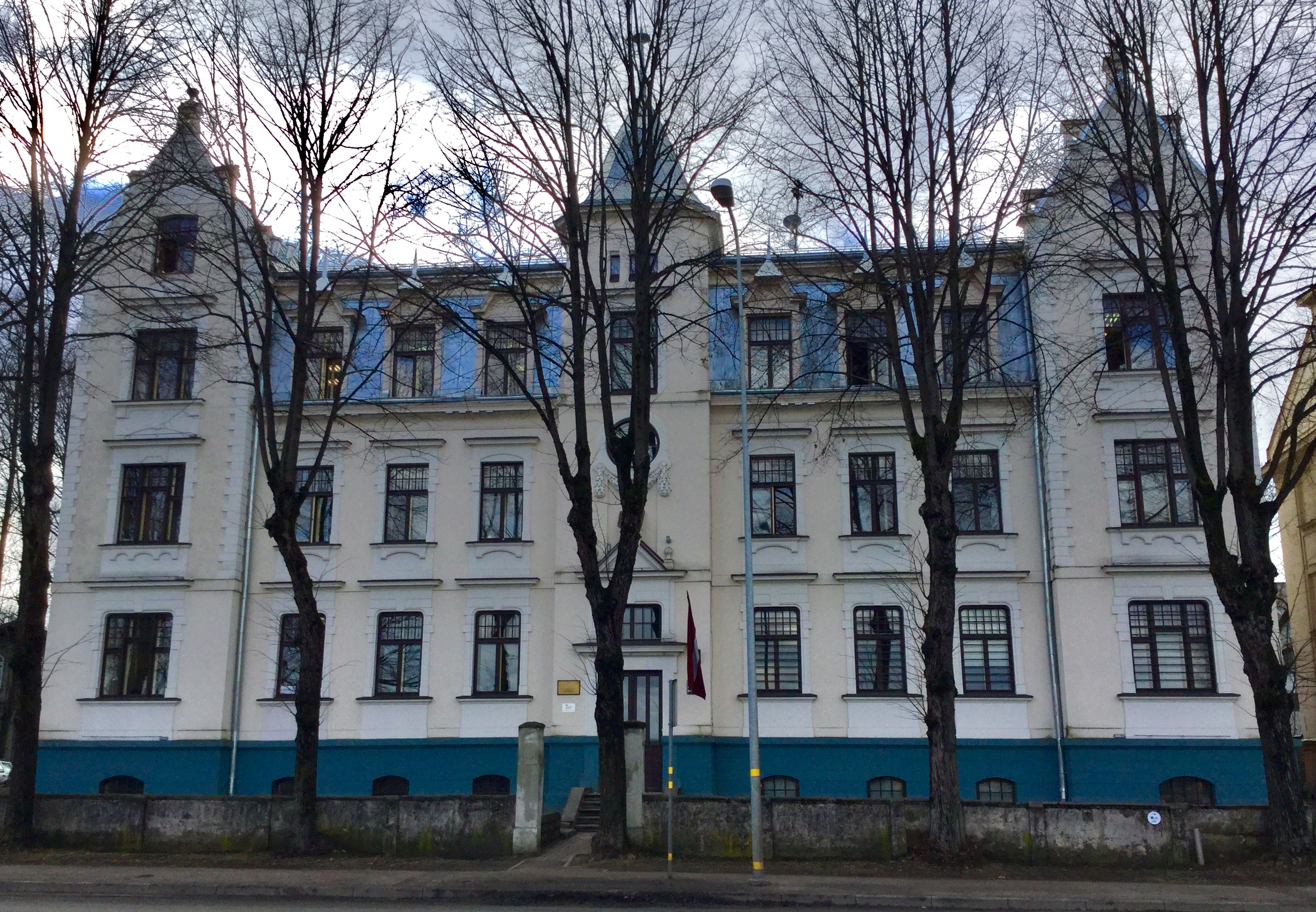
Residential (now office) building on the Daugavgrīvas street 32/34, Riga. (1903)

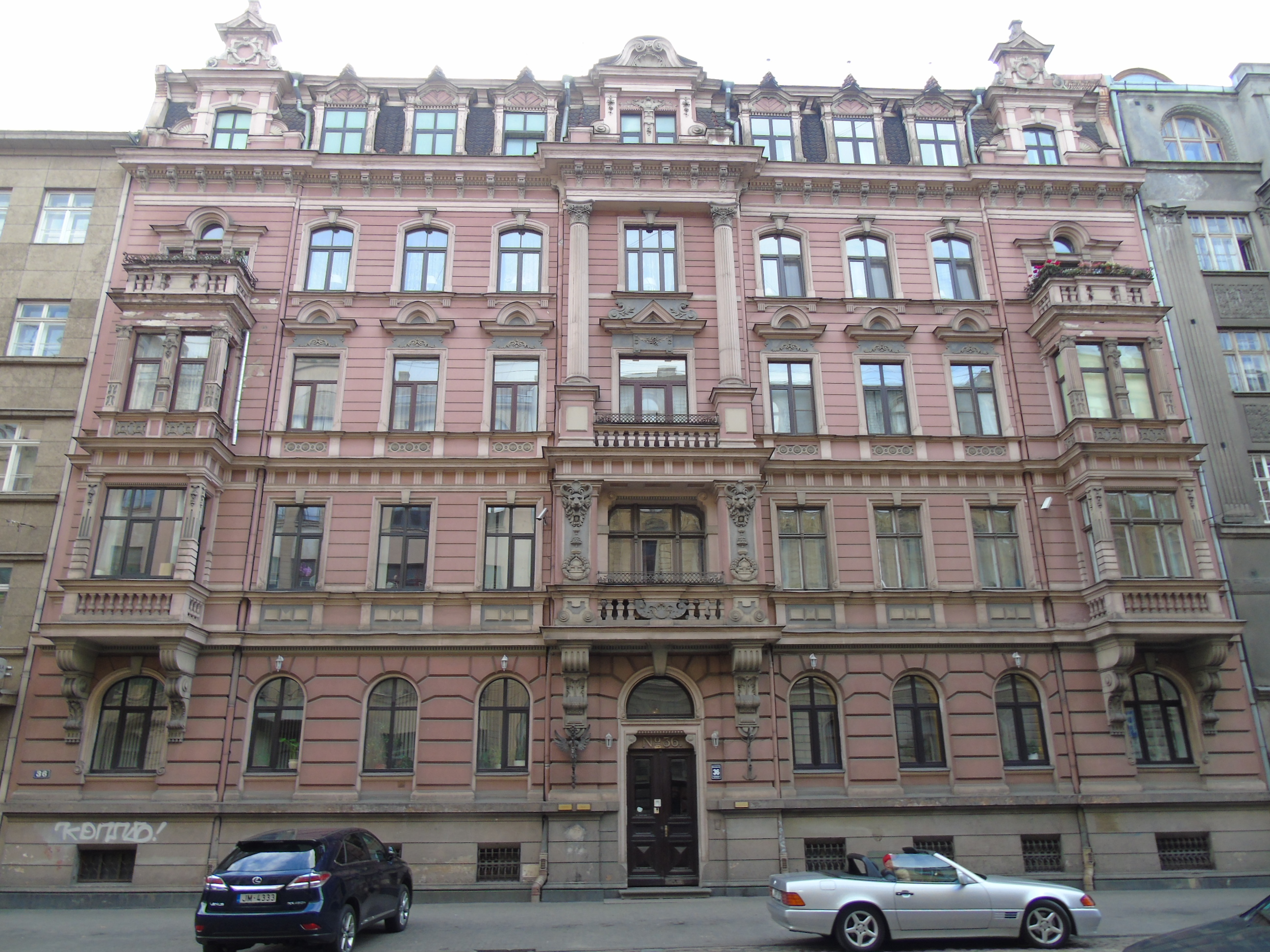
Residential building on the Blaumaņa street 36, Riga. (1901).

== See also ==
- Art Nouveau architecture in Riga
