= Taurene Parish =

Parish of Latvia

- parish of Latvia
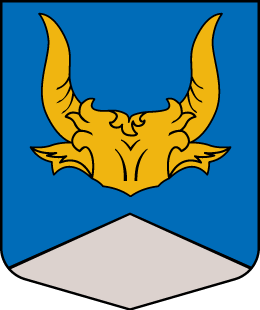
- Coat of arms

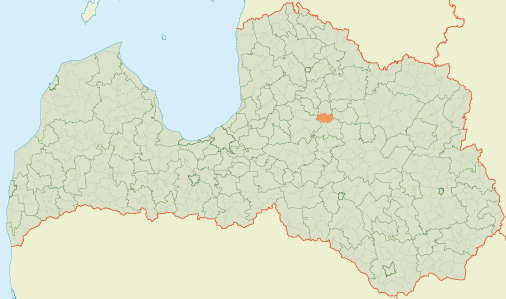
- 57°08′18″N 25°40′00″E
- Country: Latvia

Area
  - Total: 99.38 km^{2} (38.37 sq mi)
  - Land: 99.38 km^{2} (38.37 sq mi)
  - Water: 2.84 km^{2} (1.10 sq mi)

Population (1 January 2024)
  - Total: 688
  - Density: 6.9/km^{2} (18/sq mi)

Taurene Parish (Latvian: Taurenes pagasts) is an administrative unit of Cēsis Municipality in the Vidzeme region of Latvia. It is one of the 21 parishes in this municipality. Before the administrative reform of 2009, Taurene Parish was part of the former Cēsis district. Taurene is located in a hilly region. Land use consists mostly of agriculture, forests and lakes. The regional road P30 runs through Taureme.

== Towns, villages and settlements ==
Hamlets in Taurene Parish are:

- Andreni
- Banuzi
- Brezgis
- Jeruzi
- Lodes Muiza
- Mezrijas
- Nekins
- Runtes
- Taurene
- Zalkalns

== Lakes and rivers ==
The Gauja river flows through Taurene. A number of lakes are located in Taurene parish:

- Banuzu ezers
- Brenkuzu ezers
- Dabaru dīķis
- Daboru ezers
- Ilzes Lodes ezers
- Kalenites ezers
- Rijas ezers
- Stupenu ezers
- Taurenes ezers
- Zelleskaina dīķis

== Tourism ==
The Nekina Manor is located in Nekins.

In Taurene the Dutch environmental organization ARK is involved in a natural grazing project. In 2008 ARK introduced a herd of Konik horses to a privately owned piece of land. In 2012 seven of the horses of this herd were moved to a new grazing project in Ranka.
