= Albert Street, Riga =

Street in Riga, Latvia

Albert Street
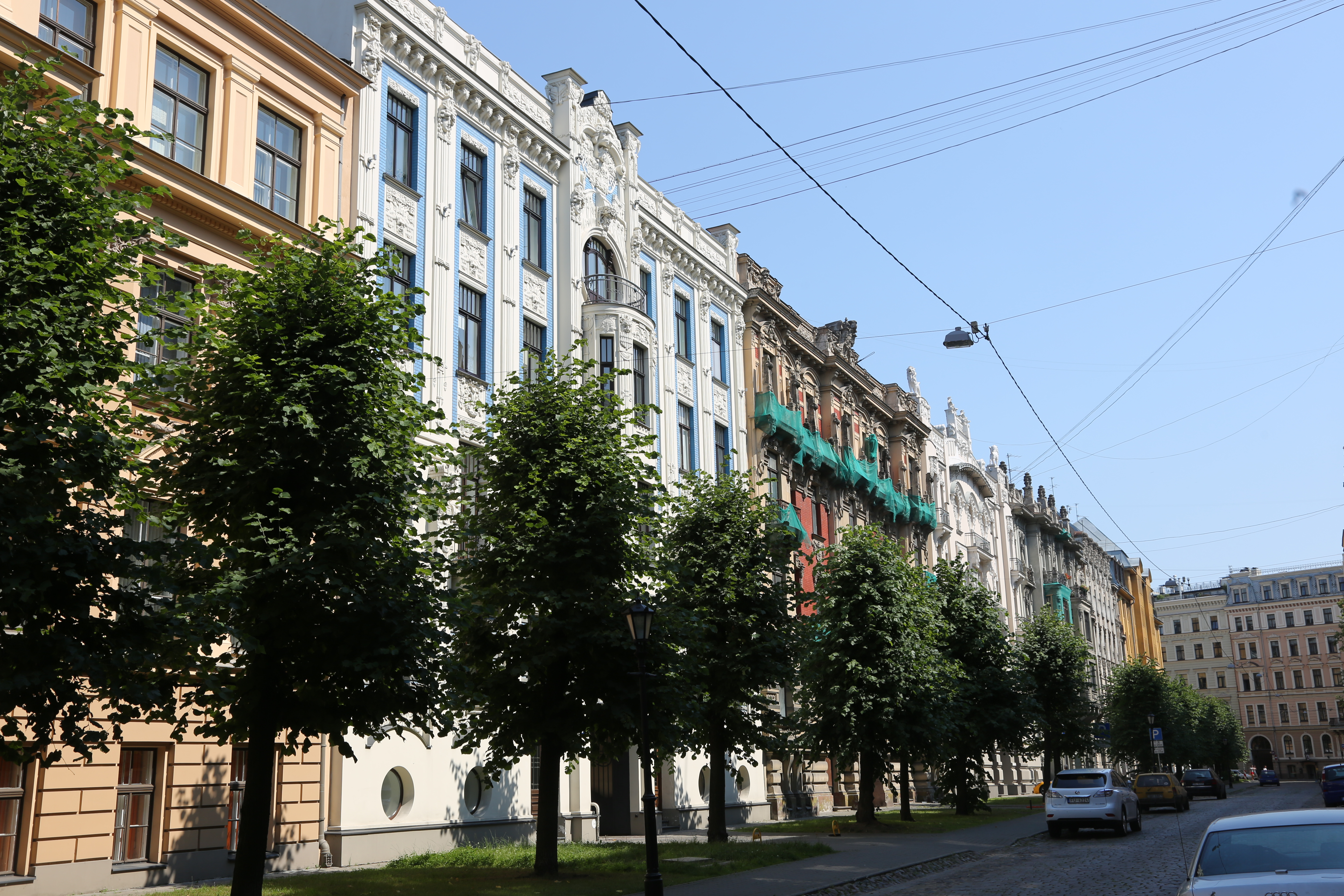
- Alberta iela 8 – 2
- Interactive map of Albert Street
- Native name: Alberta iela (Latvian)
- Former names: Albertstraße; Альбертовская улица Friča Gaiļa street
- Namesake: Bishop Albert
- Length: 255 m (837 ft)
- Coordinates: 56.95904°N 24.109712°E

Construction
- Construction start: 1901

Albert Street (Latvian: Alberta iela) is a street in central Riga known for its Art Nouveau buildings. It was built in 1901 and named after Bishop Albert, who founded Riga in 1201.

Many of the apartment buildings along the street were designed by the architect Mikhail Eisenstein, who was particularly active in Riga at the beginning of the twentieth century. His creativity is reflected through the various atypical, decorative buildings along Albert street. The architectural style makes use of structural and decorative elements of romantic nationalism common to northern Europe at the time. Konstantīns Pēkšēns and Eižens Laube, a teacher and his pupil respectively, were prominent in building design on the street at the same time. Other authors of buildings of Alberta iela include Baltic and Baltic German architects Paul Mandelstamm, Hermann Hilbig and Heinrich Scheel.

Since April 2009 Pēkšēns' former residence at number 12 has housed the Riga Art Nouveau Museum. A number of institutions of higher education are located on the street or adjacent; the Stockholm School of Economics in Riga, the Riga Graduate School of Law and the College of Business Administration. The embassies of Belgium and Ireland are also located on Alberta iela.

== Notable buildings ==
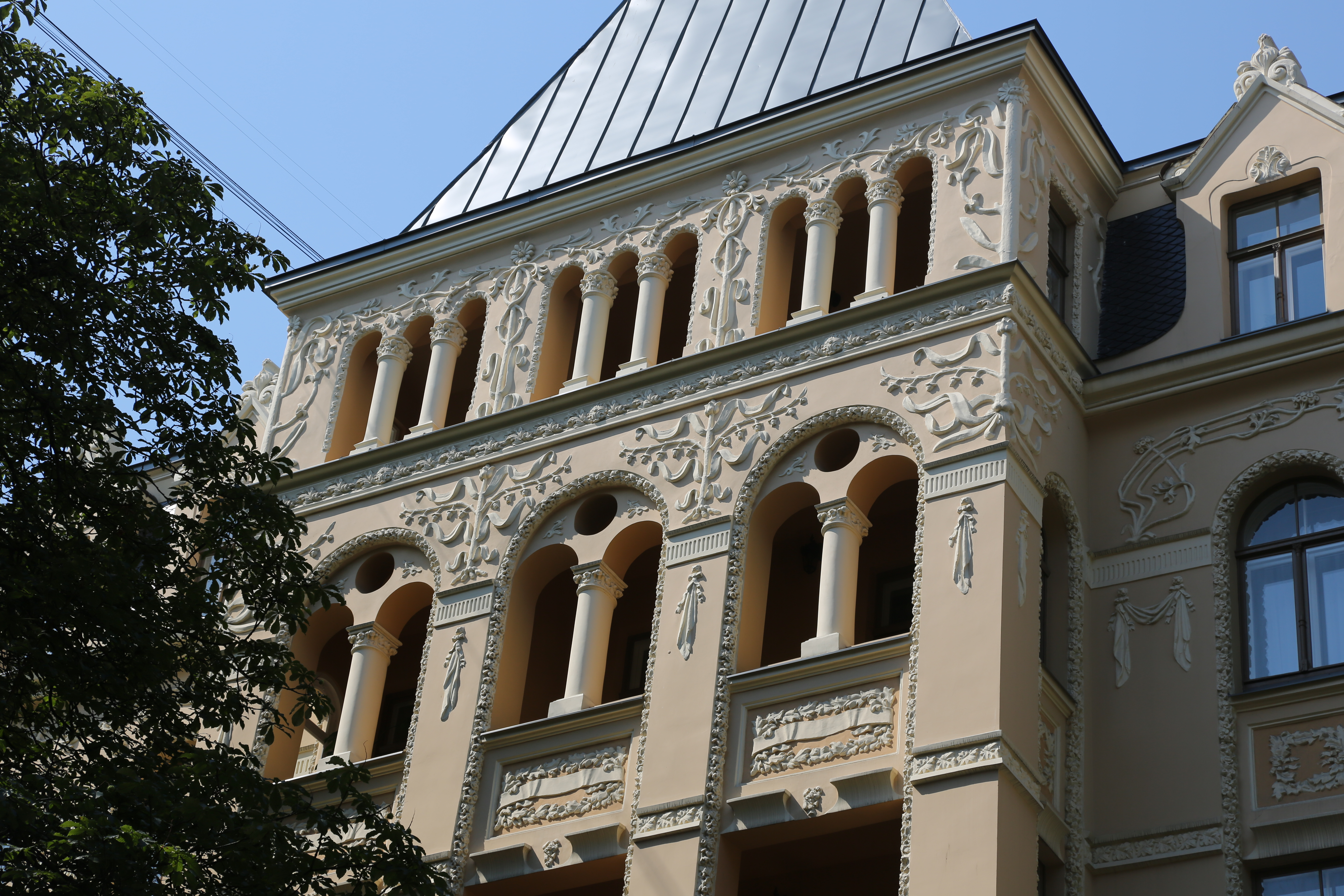
Alberta iela 1 - living house by Heinrich Scheel and August Friedrich Scheffel built in 1901. The writer Zenta Mauriņa lived here.

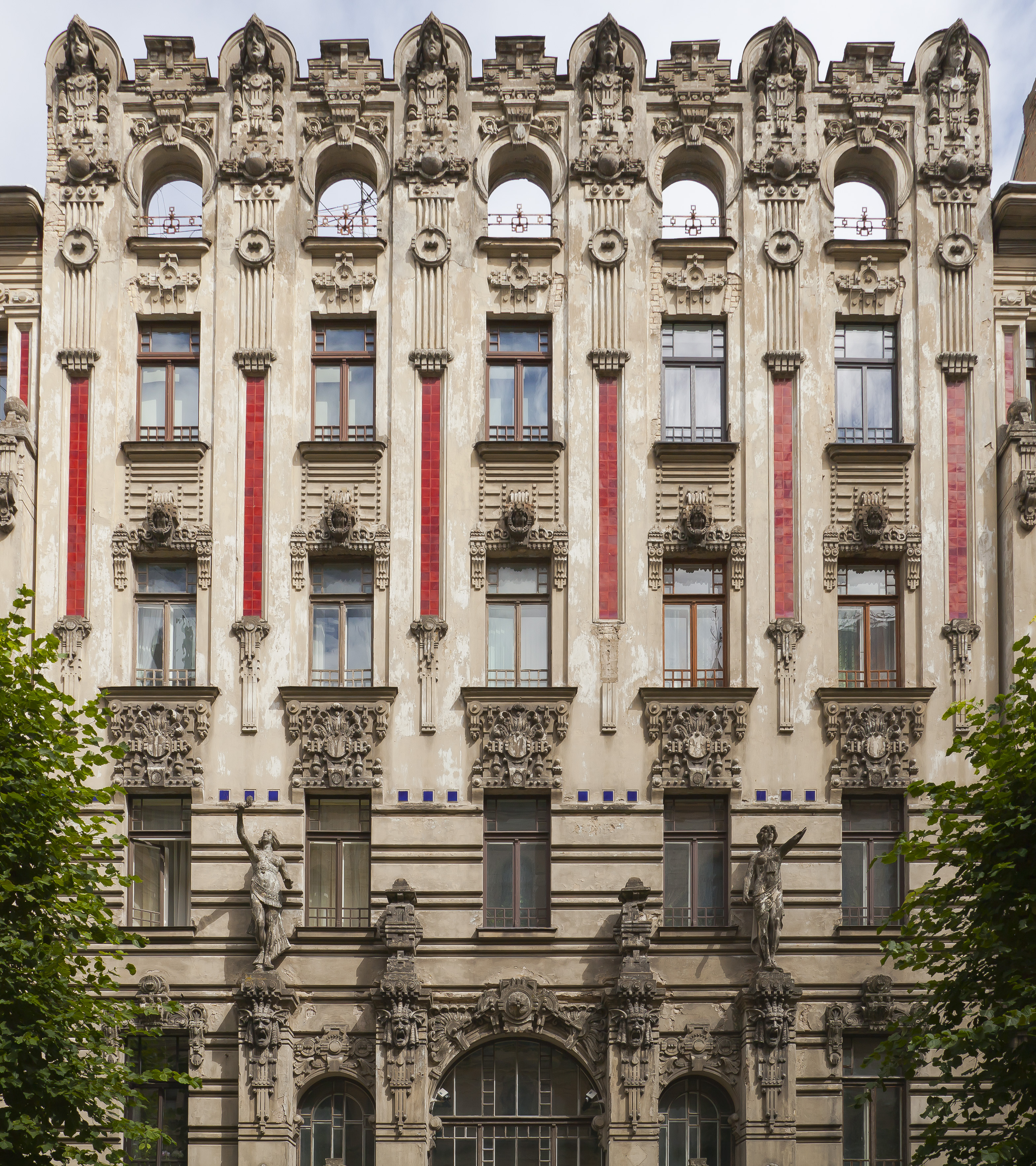
Alberta iela 2a - living house by Mikhail Eisenstein built in 1906. Isaiah Berlin spent the first years of his life there.

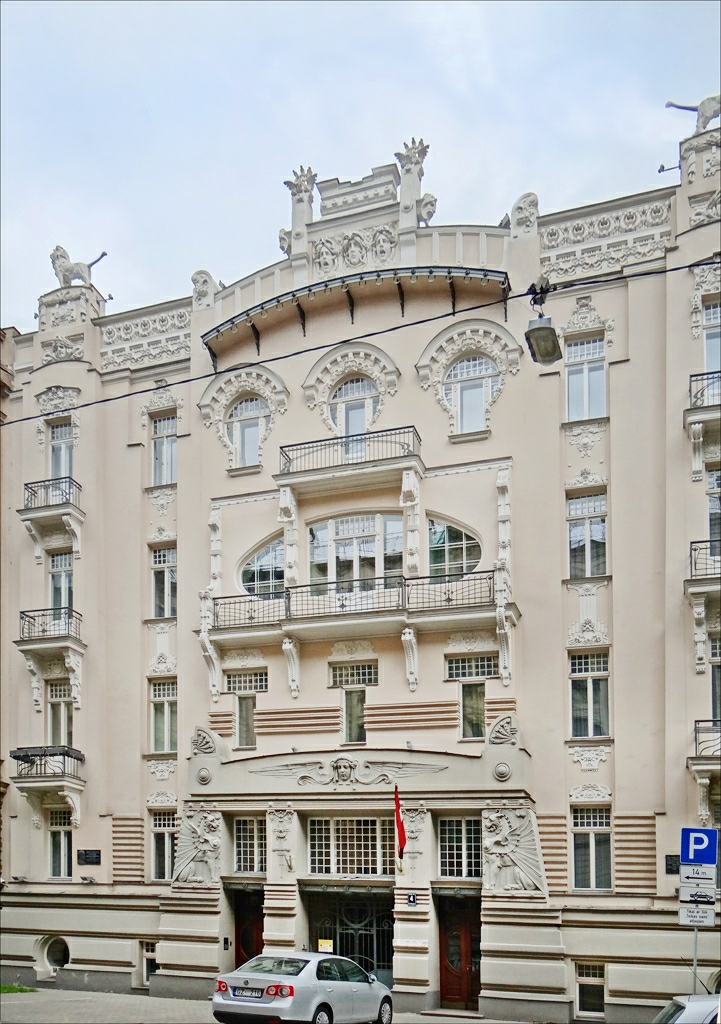
Alberta iela 4 - living house by Mikhail Eisenstein built in 1904.

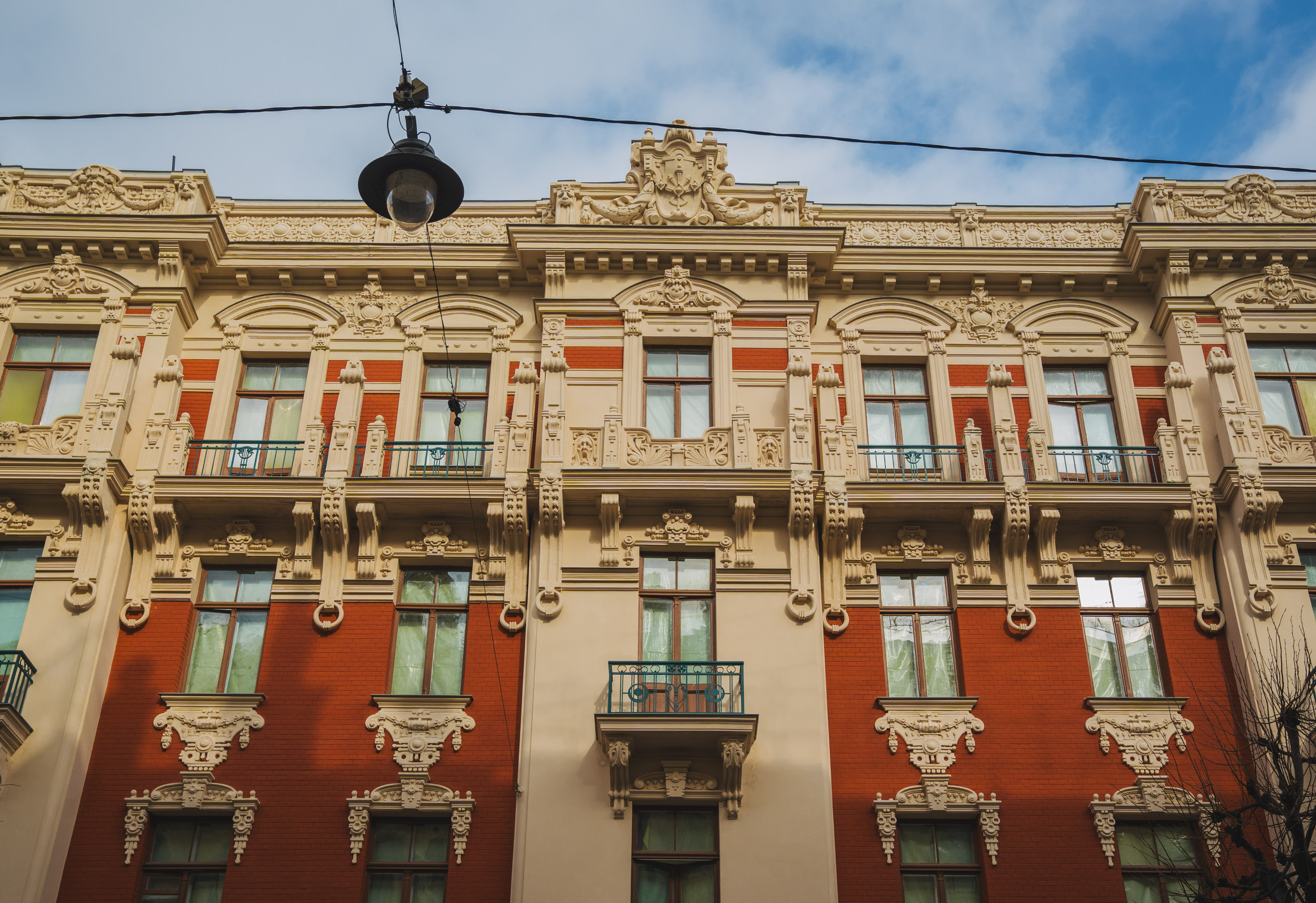
Alberta iela 6 - residential building by Mikhail Eisenstein built in 1904.

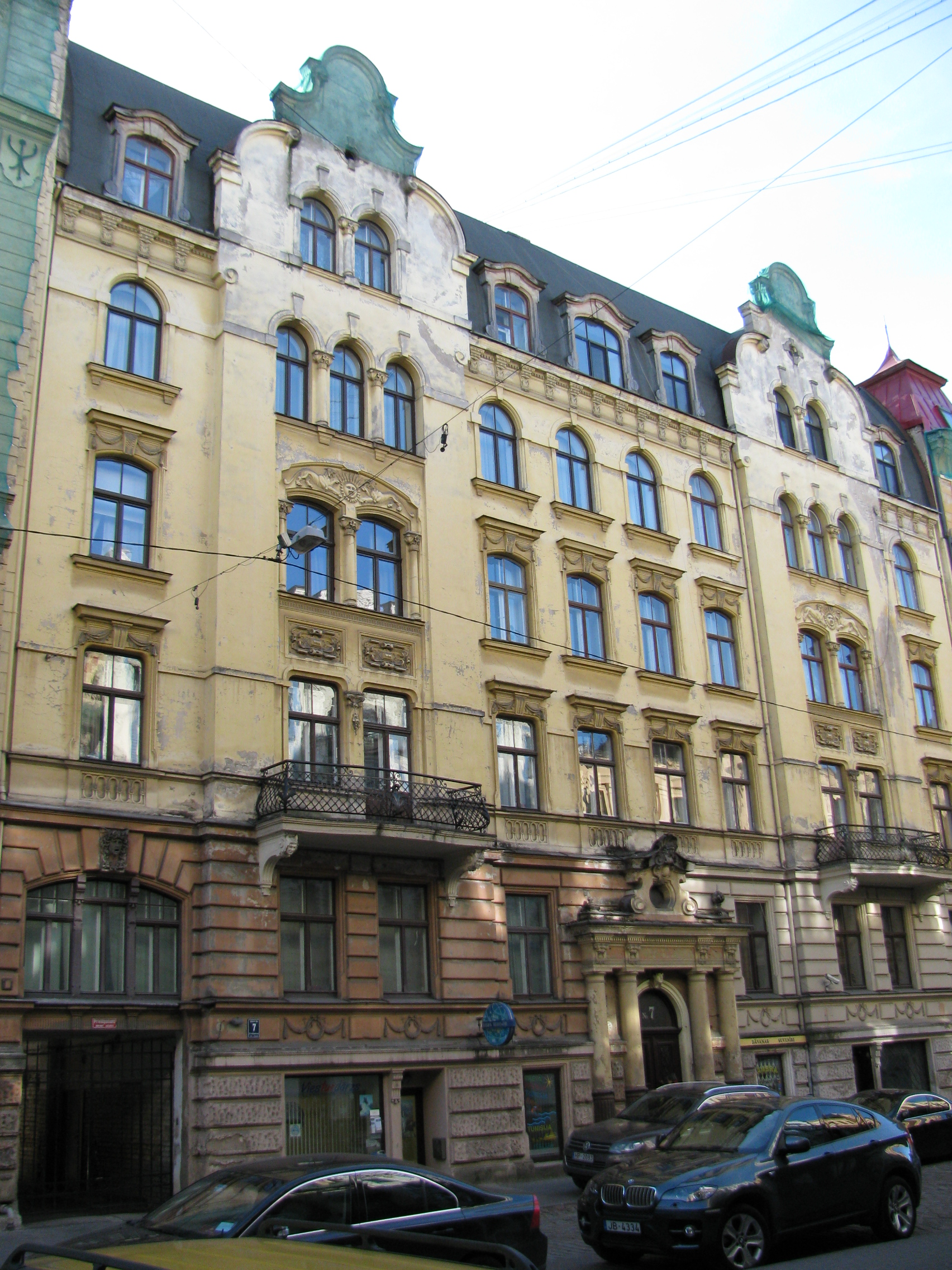
Alberta iela 7 - neo-baroque building by Hermann Hilbig.

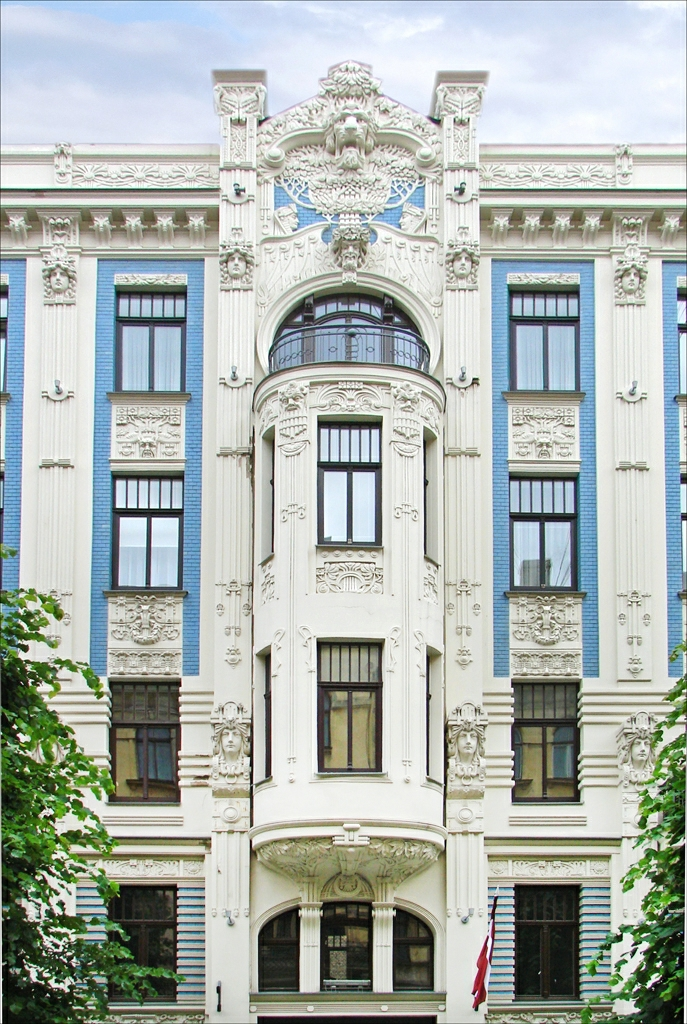
Alberta iela 8 - living house by Mikhail Eisenstein built in 1903.

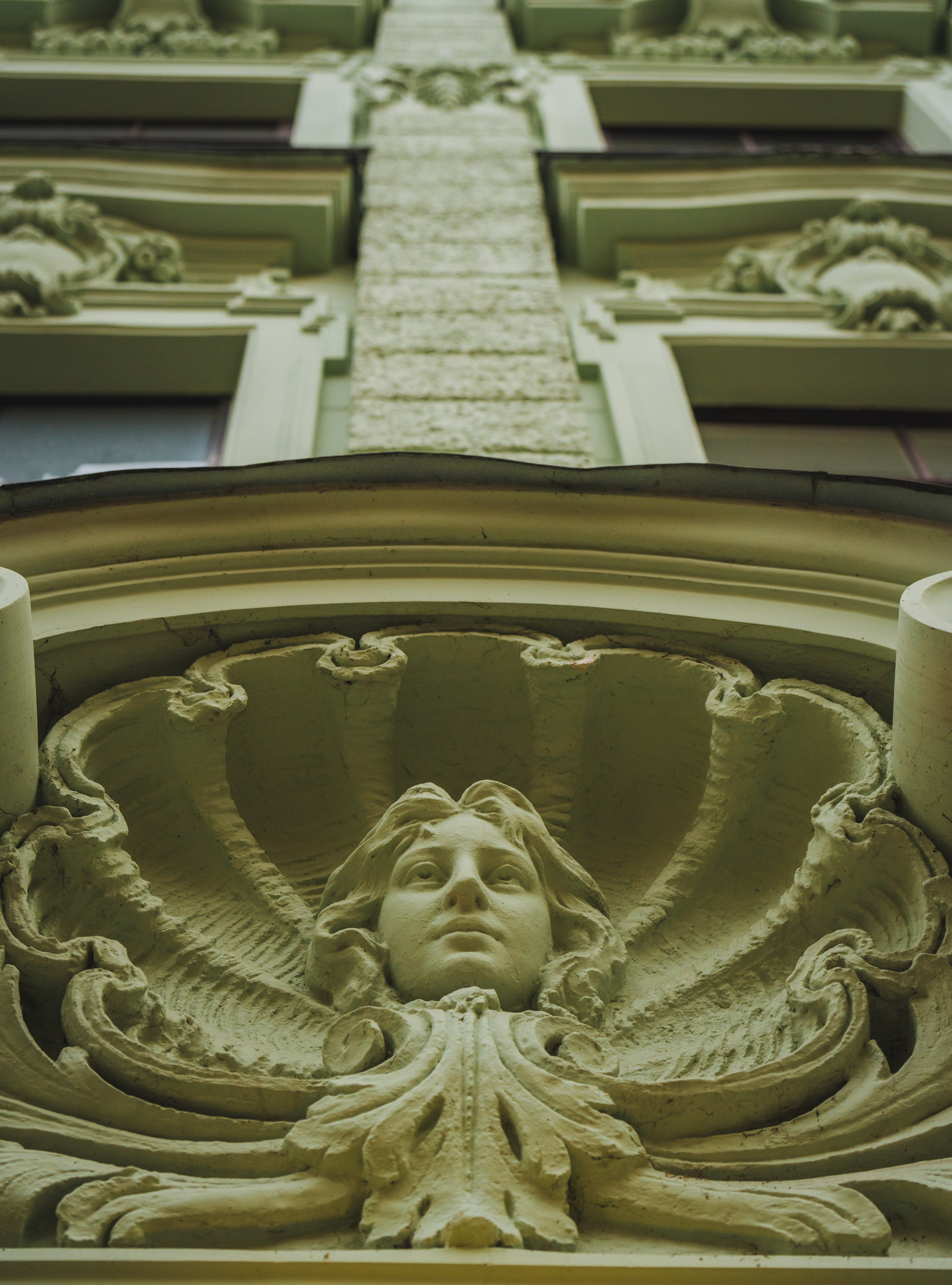
Alberta iela 9 - residential building by Konstantīns Pēkšēns, built in 1901.

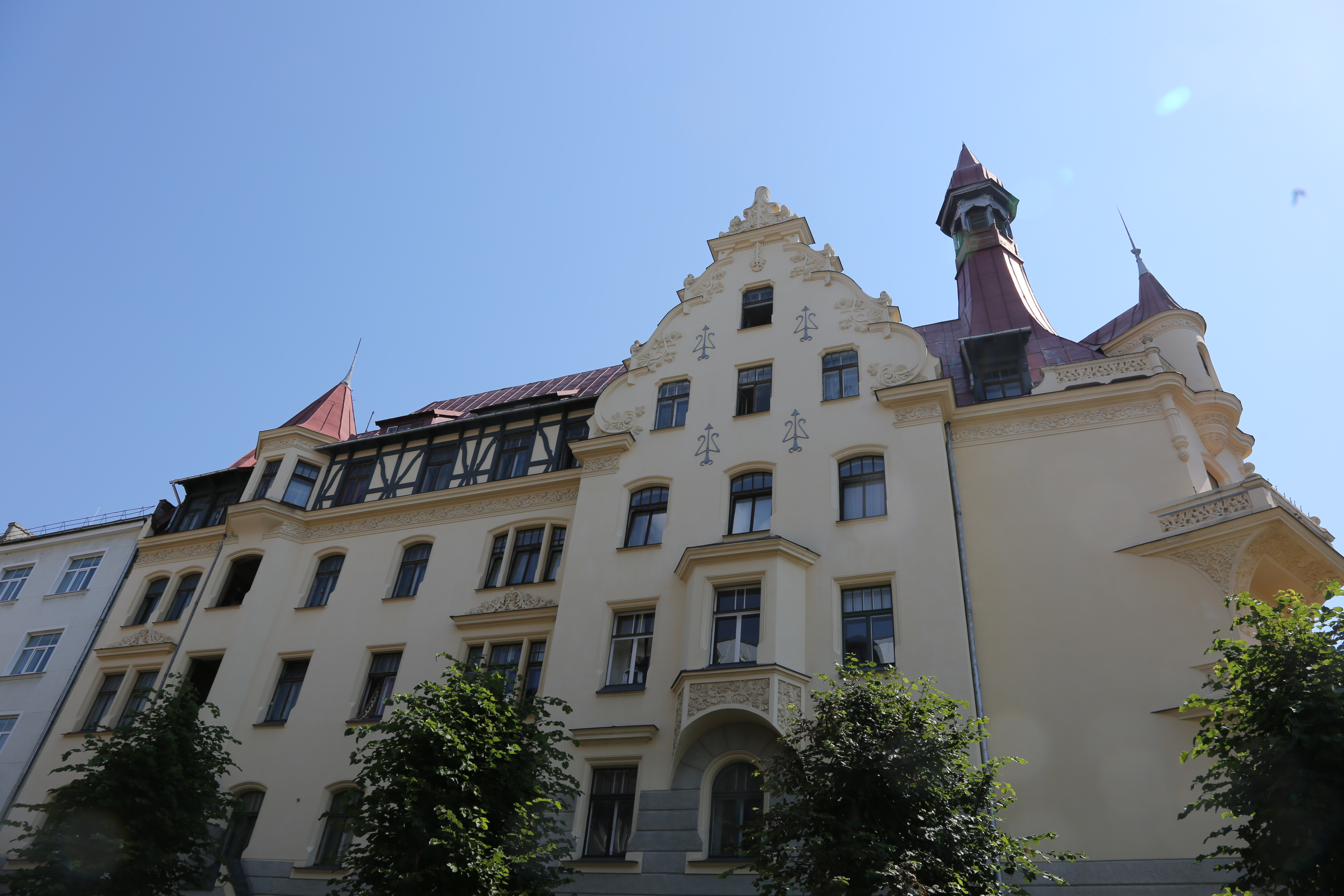
Alberta iela 12 - Art nouveau building by Konstantīns Pēkšēns and Eižens Laube. The Riga Art Nouveau Museum is located there.

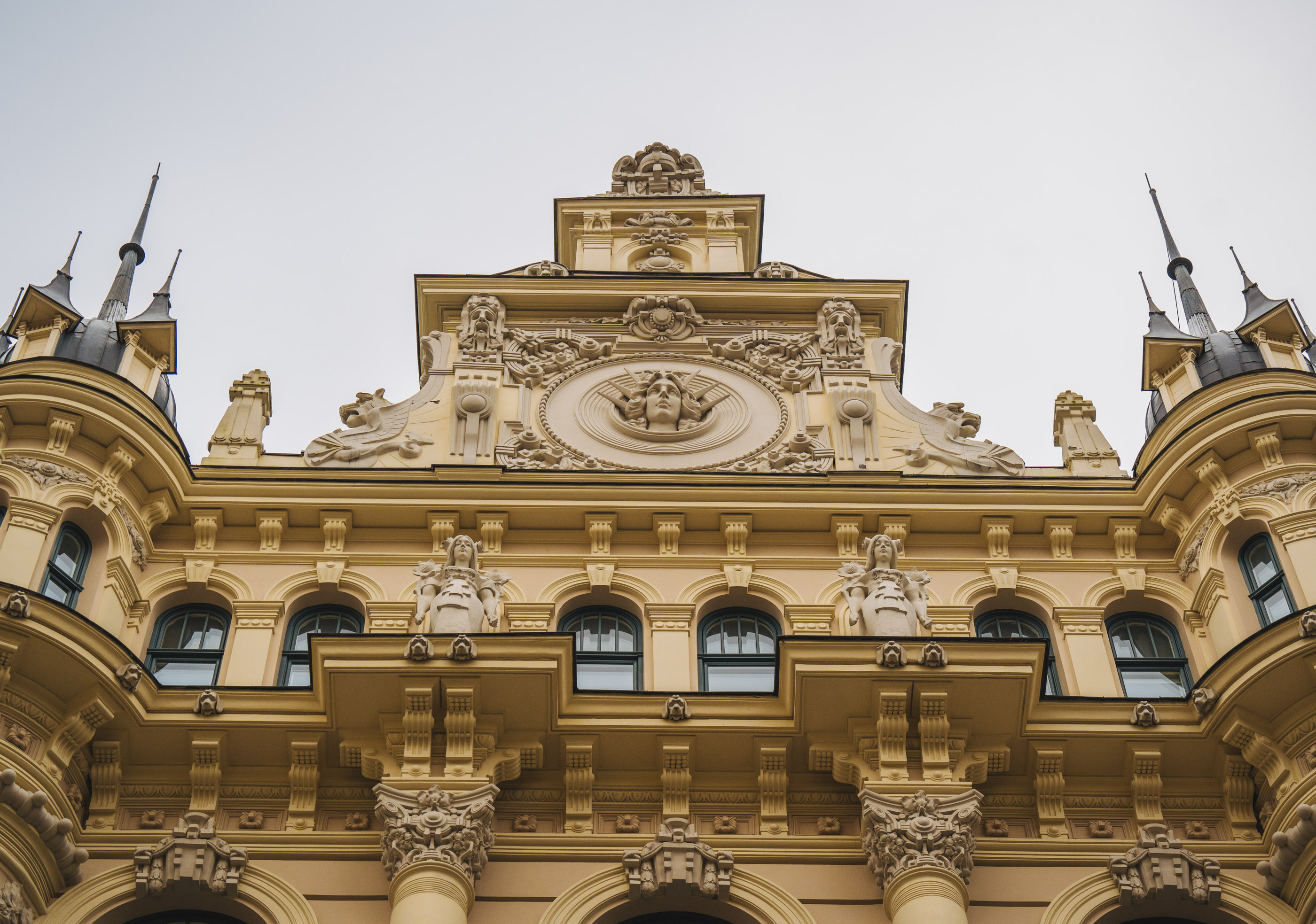
Alberta iela 13 - residential building by Mikhail Eisenstein built in 1904. Nowadays it's owned by the Riga Graduate School of Law.

== See also ==
- Art Nouveau architecture in Riga
