= Riga Graduate School of Law =

School in Riga, Latvia

Coordinates: 56.9592°N 24.1075°E

Riga Graduate School of Law (RGSL)
- Rīgas Juridiskā augstskola
- Type: Private
- Established: 1998; 28 years ago
- Rector: Laura Ratniece
- Faculty: 68
- Administrative staff: 17
- Students: ca. 450 (2017)
- Location: Riga, Latvia
- Campus: Urban
- Website: www.rgsl.edu.lv

The Riga Graduate School of Law (abbreviated as RGSL; Latvian: Rīgas Juridiskā augstskola) in Riga, Latvia is an autonomous law school in the Baltic region offering Bachelor, Master and Doctoral studies. It was established in 1998 through an international agreement between the Governments of Sweden and Latvia and the Soros Foundation.

== History ==
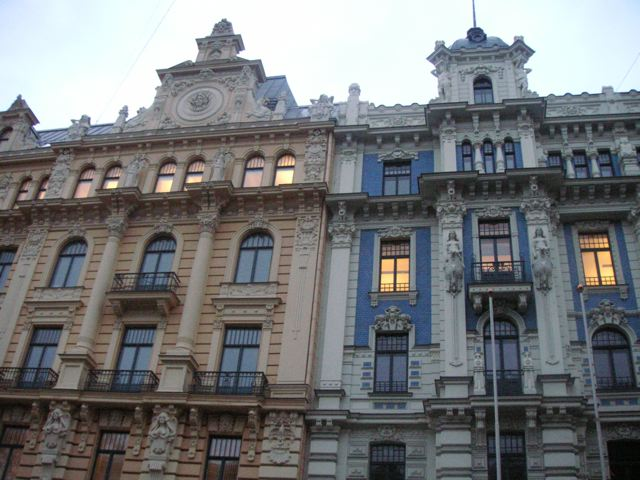
View from Strēlnieku iela

RGSL was founded as a private law school in 1998 through an international agreement between the Governments of Sweden and Latvia and the Soros Foundation. Until the accession of the Baltic States to the EU, studies at RGSL were reserved for lawyers from the Baltics. In 2004, the Law School opened its doors for students from all over the world. In 2005, RGSL was made an autonomous institution within the University of Latvia (LU, Latvijas Universitāte) according to an agreement between Sweden and Latvia under which all shares held by the two countries (76%) were transferred to the University of Latvia. The Soros Foundation of Latvia has retained its shares (24%).

== Master Programmes ==
RGSL offers post graduate degree programmes in Public International law & Human rights, European Law, Law and Finance, commercial law, law and technology all taught exclusively in English. The programmes are taught on site by an international faculty of resident and visiting professors, lecturers and practitioners from Europe and the USA.

Riga Graduate School of Law (RGSL) offers legal education at an advanced level. The teaching methodology is research-based and extends beyond the field of law itself, offering access to related fields such as economics, business, and policy. Current degree courses include LL.M in International and European Law, LL.M in Law and Finance, LL.M in Public International Law and Human Rights, LL.M in Transborder Commercial Law, and MA in European Union Law and Policy.

RGSL is an independent institution within the University of Latvia and teaching is conducted exclusively in English. RGSL boasts an international student body, from the various European Union member and non-member states, the Balkans, CIS states, and the Americas. The international aspect of student life is a core element of RGSL development and diversity.

The resident members of faculty offer teaching in their respective fields of competence. Visiting professors from other universities and organisations conduct a relatively large part of the teaching. Practitioners from institutions such as the European Court of Justice and the EU Trade Marks and Designs Office appear as guest speakers on courses.

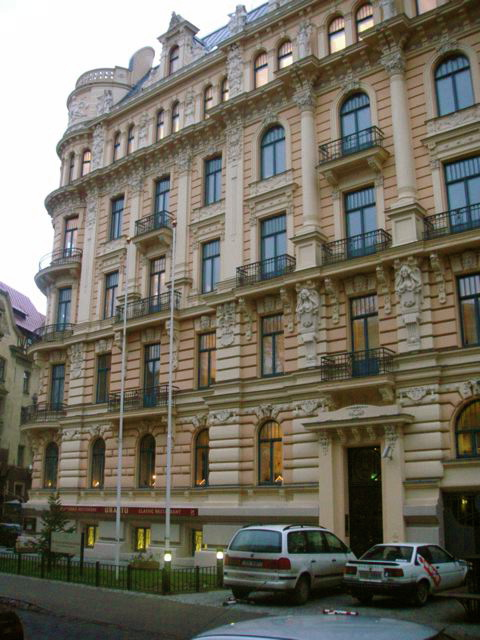
View from Strēlnieku iela

=== International and European Law ===
The LL.M in International and European Law programme in International and European Law integrates Public International Law, International Trade Law, and European Union Law, preparing students for careers in practice or administration at national or European level. The programme comprises both theoretical study and class work, followed by a Master’s thesis. The teaching methodology is interactive and based on a mix of lectures and seminars.

=== Law and Finance ===
The LL.M in Law and Finance is an interdisciplinary programme designed with regional, European and international needs in mind.

=== Public International Law and Human Rights ===
The LL.M in Public International Law and Human Rights programme is intended for students who are interested in pursuing their professional carriers in international organisations, private law firms, public authorities, or in academia. The programme allows for a combination of courses from three tracks: European Union Law, International Commercial Law, Public International and Human Rights Law.

=== Transborder Commercial Law ===
The LL.M. in Transborder Commercial Law programme is designed to focus on practical aspects of transborder trade within the European Union and on international conditions framing European Union trade. It is designed to meet the needs of lawyers working in the private sector.

=== European Union Law and Policy ===
The LL.M in European Union Law, and Policy programme covers integration, the role of the European Court of Justice, selected aspects under the second and third pillars, as well as policy implementation and negotiation.

== Bachelor Programmes ==
The two Bachelor programmes are both taught in English and have a three-year duration.

=== Law and Business ===
The LL.B in Law and Business programme covers issues related to International, Comparative and European Law, as well as issues related to Economics, Finance, Marketing and Management. It will cover all the topics of a normal law degree, but will do so from a transnational perspective, and it will provide an understanding of the relations between Law and Business. The purpose is to train candidates aiming for positions in business and international legal practice.

=== Law and Diplomacy ===
The BA in Law and Diplomacy programme will cover issues related to Law, Economics and International Relations. The programme is offered by RGSL in cooperation with the University of Latvia. The purpose is to train candidates aiming for positions within foreign ministries, international organisations and NGOs, as well as for journalistic work in the media sector. The studies may be continued on all RGSL Masters programmes, for example the LL.M in International and European law.

== Continuing Legal Education ==
Through its programme of continuing legal education (CLE) the School offers education opportunities for practicing lawyers working in both the private and public sector and for their support staff.

== Research ==
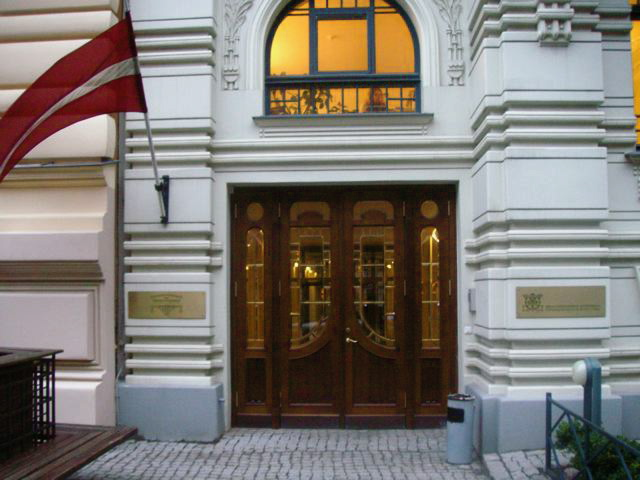
Main Entrance

=== Projects ===
The Law School is involved in a number of European research projects, amongst others in the following:

- ENACT - European Citizenship
- PRIV-WAR - Regulating Privatisation of War
- RECON - Reconstructing Democracy in Europe

=== Publications ===
The School publishes the RGSL Working Papers, a series documenting studies undertaken by academic staff, students and guest speakers. A number of distinguished legal practitioners and academics have contributed to the series, among them Luzius Wildhaber, former President of the European Court of Human Rights, Jutta Limbach, former President of the German Constitutional Court, and Anita Usacka, Judge of the International Criminal Court.

== Library ==
The Law School's library hosts one of the prime legal collections in Central and Eastern Europe and is open to the public.

== Campus ==
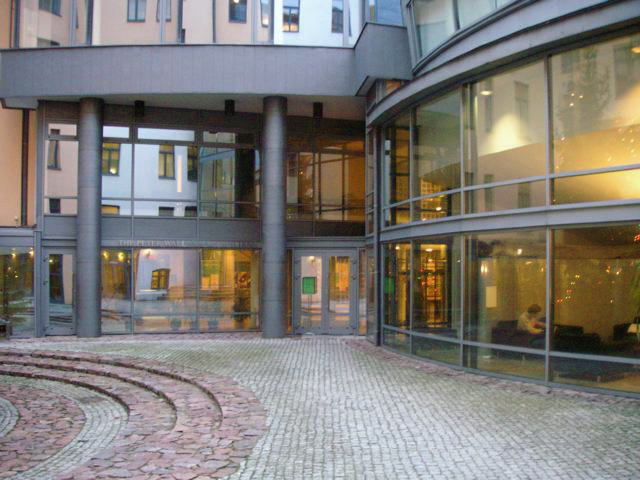
Courtyard

RGSL's premises are situated in Alberta iela, an important street for Art Nouveau architecture. The premises were donated to the Law School by the Soros Foundation in 1998 and were officially inaugurated by Crown Princess Victoria of Sweden and the President of the Republic of Latvia, Vaira Vike-Freiberga, in 2001. The Law School shares its courtyard, main auditorium, cafeteria and library with the Stockholm School of Economics in Riga (SSE Riga). The Law School's address is Strēlnieku iela 4k-2, Rīga, LV-1010.

== Rectors ==
- Jan Ramberg, Sweden (1998–2001)
- Norbert Reich, Germany (2001–2004)
- John Burke, USA (2004–2007)
- Lesley Jane Smith, UK (2007–2008)
- George Ulrich, Denmark (2009–2016)
- Jānis Ikstens, Latvia (2016–2019)
- Pietro Sullo, Italy (2019–2022)
- Adam Czarnota, Poland (2022–2024)
- Laura Ratniece, Latvia (2024–present)
