= Mikhail Eisenstein =

Russian architect and civil engineer (1867–1920)

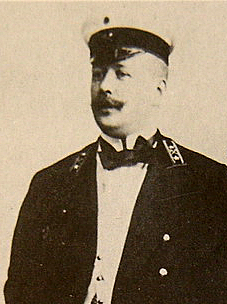
Mikhail Eisenstein

Mikhail Osipovich Eisenstein (Russian: Михаил Осипович Эйзенштейн, romanized: Michail Osipovič Ejzenštein, Latvian: Mihails Eizenšteins; 17 September [O.S. 5] 1867 – 2 July 1920) was a civil engineer and architect working in Riga, the present-day capital of Latvia, when the city was part of the Russian Empire. He was active as an architect in the city at a time of great economic expansion and consequent enlargement, which coincided with the flourishing of Art Nouveau architecture. During the years 1901–1906, Eisenstein designed many of the best-known Art Nouveau buildings of Riga. His son, Sergei Eisenstein, became a well-known Soviet film director.

== Biography ==
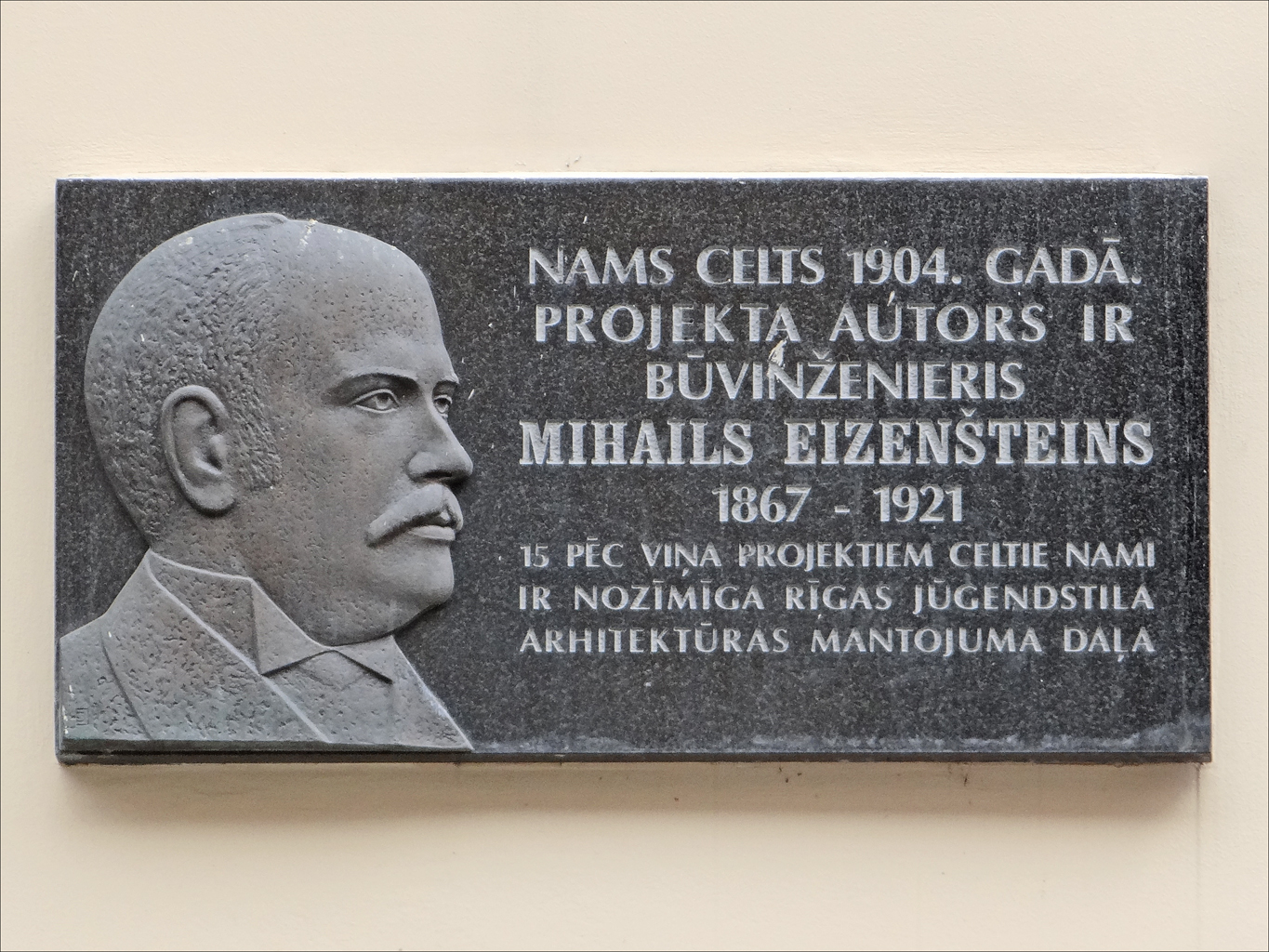
Memorial plaque on Alberta iela 4

The archival documents from his personal file as a student at Saint-Petersburg University of Civil Engineering (1887–1893), published by professor and head of the Department of the History of Western Art of Saint Petersburg State University Roman Sokolov, Ph.D., show that Mikhail Eisenstein was born as Moisey Eisenstein into a merchant Jewish family in Bila Tserkva (Kiev Governorate, in present-day Ukraine).

Eizenstein converted to the Russian Orthodox Church in 1897 and became a devout Christian. According to his son, he was a "staunch representative and admirer of the Russian bureaucratic class". He studied in Saint Petersburg and graduated as a civil engineer in 1893. Soon thereafter he moved to Riga, the present-day capital of Latvia, which was then part of the Russian Empire. He would continue living in Riga until 1917. He was employed at the traffic road department of the regional authorities in the Governorate of Livonia in 1895 and in 1900 appointed head of the department. His work at the department contributed to a rationalization of the maintenance and management of infrastructure in the region. He was awarded several medals and awards for his work as a civil servant, including the Order of Saint Anna (II and III classes) and the Order of Saint Stanislaus (II and III classes). At the same time, he practiced as an independent architect.

In 1897 he married Yulia Ivanovna Konetskaya, who came from a prosperous non-Jewish family in Saint Petersburg. The couple settled in a large apartment in central Riga and took active part in the social life of the city's upper strata. According to the recollections of his son, the family had an international outlook and Eisenstein spoke both German and French in addition to Russian. He was interested in history and literature, and his library contained the works of Nikolai Gogol, Leo Tolstoy, Emile Zola, Alexandre Dumas, and Victor Hugo. Apart from his interest in contemporary architecture, Eisenstein enjoyed art and especially admired the paintings of Konstantin Makovsky. Due to "differences in temperament" and after Yulia had an affair with a general, the couple separated in 1909 and formally divorced in 1912. The couple had only one son, Sergei Eisenstein, who would become a well-known Soviet film director.

Following the Russian Revolution, Eisenstein joined the "Whites" (anti-revolutionaries) as an engineer in 1918. His son chose to join the Bolsheviks, which ended their relationship. After the end of the Russian Civil War, Eisenstein settled in Berlin, where he died in 1920. He is buried at the Berlin-Tegel Russian Orthodox Cemetery.

== Architecture ==
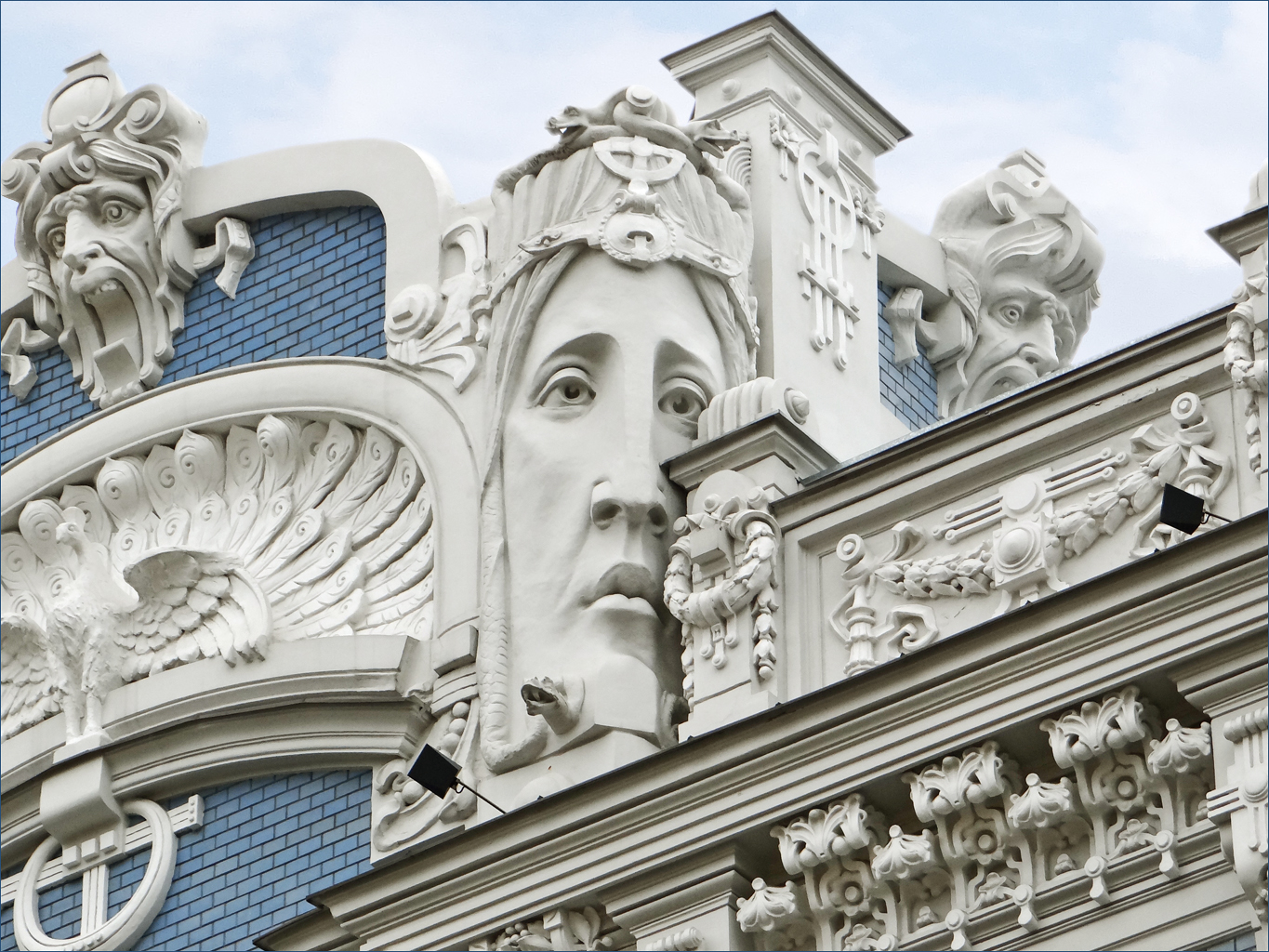
The facades of Eisenstein's buildings are often profusely decorated, such as the building on Elizabetes iela 10b

Eisenstein was active as an independent architect in Riga at a time of great economical expansion and consequent enlargement of the city, which coincided with the flourishing of Art Nouveau in the city. Even today, Riga has the highest concentration of Art Nouveau buildings anywhere in the world.

Eisenstein designed some of the arguably most well-known of these Art Nouveau buildings, several of which are grouped together on Alberta iela (Albert Street) with other noteworthy buildings by Konstantīns Pēkšēns and Eižens Laube. Since almost no archival or biographical documents remain connected to the life of Eisenstein, his artistic development can only be sketched. It is known that he visited Paris and he may have attended to Exposition Universelle of 1900 and experienced the Art Nouveau architecture of Hector Guimard and Gustave Serrurier-Bovy as well as the L'Art Nouveau art gallery of S. Bing first-hand; he certainly brought home large numbers of French architectural reviews. Inspiration may also have come from the Vienna Secession and the architecture of Viennese architects Otto Wagner and Josef Hoffmann, which display some superficial similarities with that of Eisenstein. Contemporary Art Nouveau architecture in Saint Petersburg also clearly influenced Eisenstein. It has furthermore been noted that the decorative motifs employed by Eisenstein suggest a strong association with Symbolist ideas.

In any case, the main corpus of buildings designed by Eisenstein share a number of characteristics. They are representatives of a highly, occasionally extremely, decorative form of Art Nouveau and display some innovative use of new materials such as cast iron but are conservative in their spatial layout. Although well known because they are so lavish, Eisenstein's buildings are not representative of Art Nouveau buildings in Riga more broadly.

== Buildings by Eisenstein ==
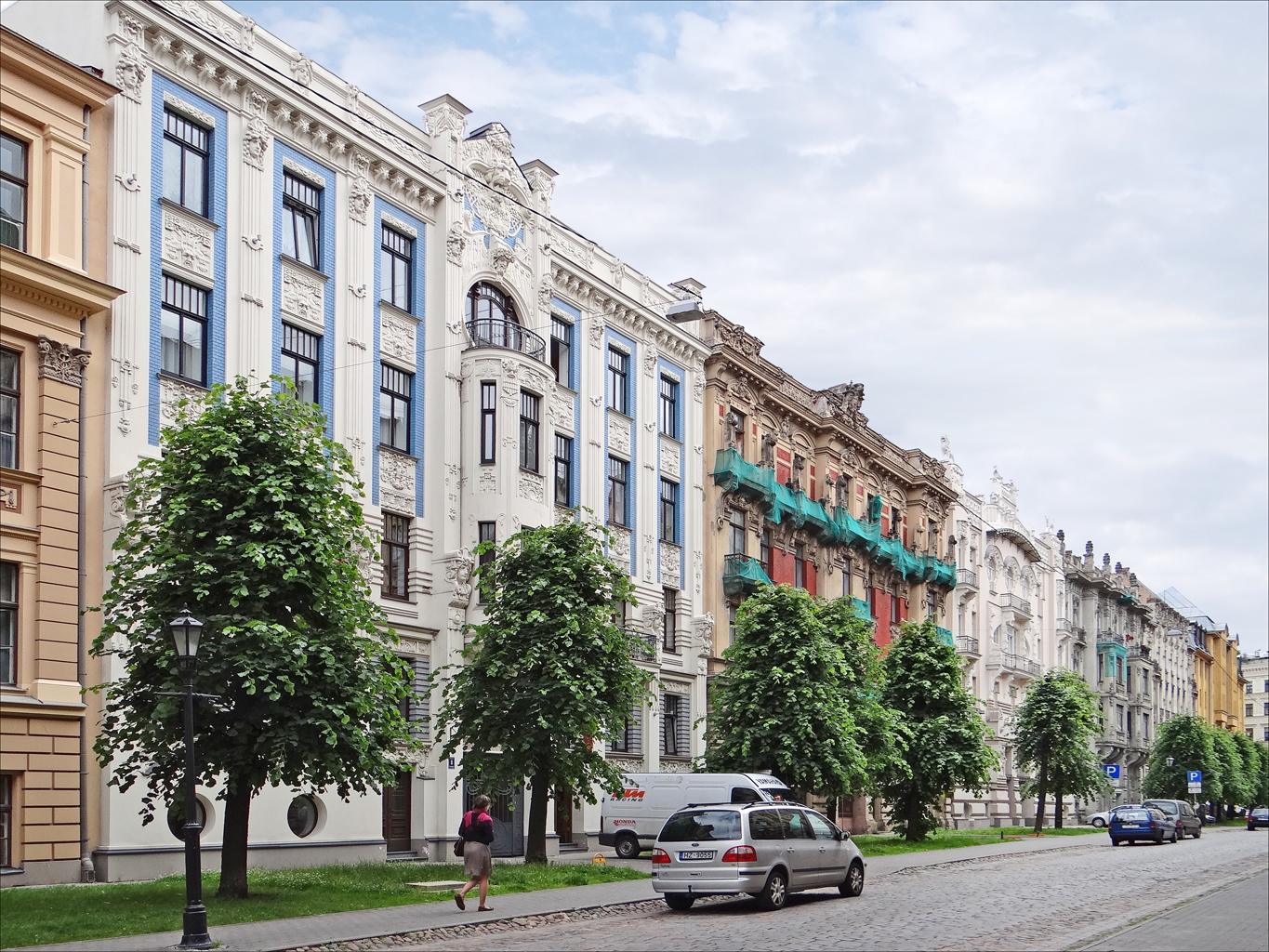
Alberta iela, Riga. The three buildings closest to the viewer were all designed by Eisenstein

Eisenstein designed a total of about 20 buildings in Riga. While Eisenstein designed buildings as early as 1897, these were in a rather typical and plain Historicist style and bear little resemblance with his later work, characterized by "exuberance and love of ornament".

The work for which Eisenstein is most well-known are a set of buildings on and near Alberta iela built between 1901 and 1906. Together they form an architectural ensemble which Jeremy Howard has described in the following way: "As a whole the tenements create a distinctively stylised and energised ensemble, yet at the same time each building appears to compete with its neighbours in terms of modern decorative extravagance." Several of these houses were commissioned by Eisenstein's wealthy client A. Lebedinsky.

The first of the buildings forming this loose ensemble is a tenement house on Elizabetes iela (Elisabeth Street) 33, built in a transitional style between Historicism and Art Nouveau in 1901. Already in this building, Eisenstein's characteristic use of pronounced stringcourses and rich sculptural decoration drawing from a Symbolist vocabulary of forms is present. These and other traits, such as Eisenstein's "dramatic sense of contrasts expressed in architectural, sculptural and decorative forms as well as in color, texture and scale" become even more pronounced in the somewhat later buildings on Alberta iela, for example the somewhat more vertically oriented house on number 8 (1903), the strikingly red- and cream-coloured building on number 6 (1903) and the building on Elizabetes iela 10b (1903) with its unusual giant female heads flanking the central bay.

The facade of Elizabetes iela 10b was based on patterns and drawings published by two Leipzig-based architects, G. Wünschmann and H. Kozel. The building on Alberta iela 10a was originally designed by Eižens Laube but the facade was rebuilt in 1903 by Eisenstein, containing elements which may have been inspired by the Secession Building in Vienna by Joseph Maria Olbrich. The building on Alberta iela number 4 (1904), also commissioned by Lebedinsky, is more ornamentally restrained with a facade dominated by contrastic window shapes and several large sculptures, including two standing lions elevated above the roof on pedestals at the corners, Medusa heads and reliefs of lions or griffins flanking the entrance. It has been described as one of the most distinctive of Eisenstein's facades, together with the building on 2a.

The building on Alberta iela 2a (in which the Russian-British philosopher Isaiah Berlin lived 1905–1915) on the other hand is characterized by strong colour contrasts and a strong vertical orientation of the facade; it was designed in 1905. Another project for Lebedinsky is the building on the corner of Alberta iela and Strēlnieku iela, built 1904–1906 again in a richly decorated Symbolist form of Art Nouveau with elements of Historicism. The last building of this ensemble, located on Brīvības iela 99 and built in 1905, again displays plentiful sculptural ornament and deep horizontal grooves and stringcourses.

A few later buildings by Eisenstein also survive in Riga, so for example on Strūgu iela 3 and Lomonosova iela 3. These buildings, built in 1911, lack the characteristic profuse sculptural decoration of Eisenstein's earlier work and may reflect an adaptation to changing international trends towards a reduction in ornamentation, formulated in Adolf Loos' influential essay from 1910, Ornament and Crime. These later buildings by Eisenstein however still contain recognizable traits of the architect, notably the use of lively colour contrasts.

== Representative buildings ==
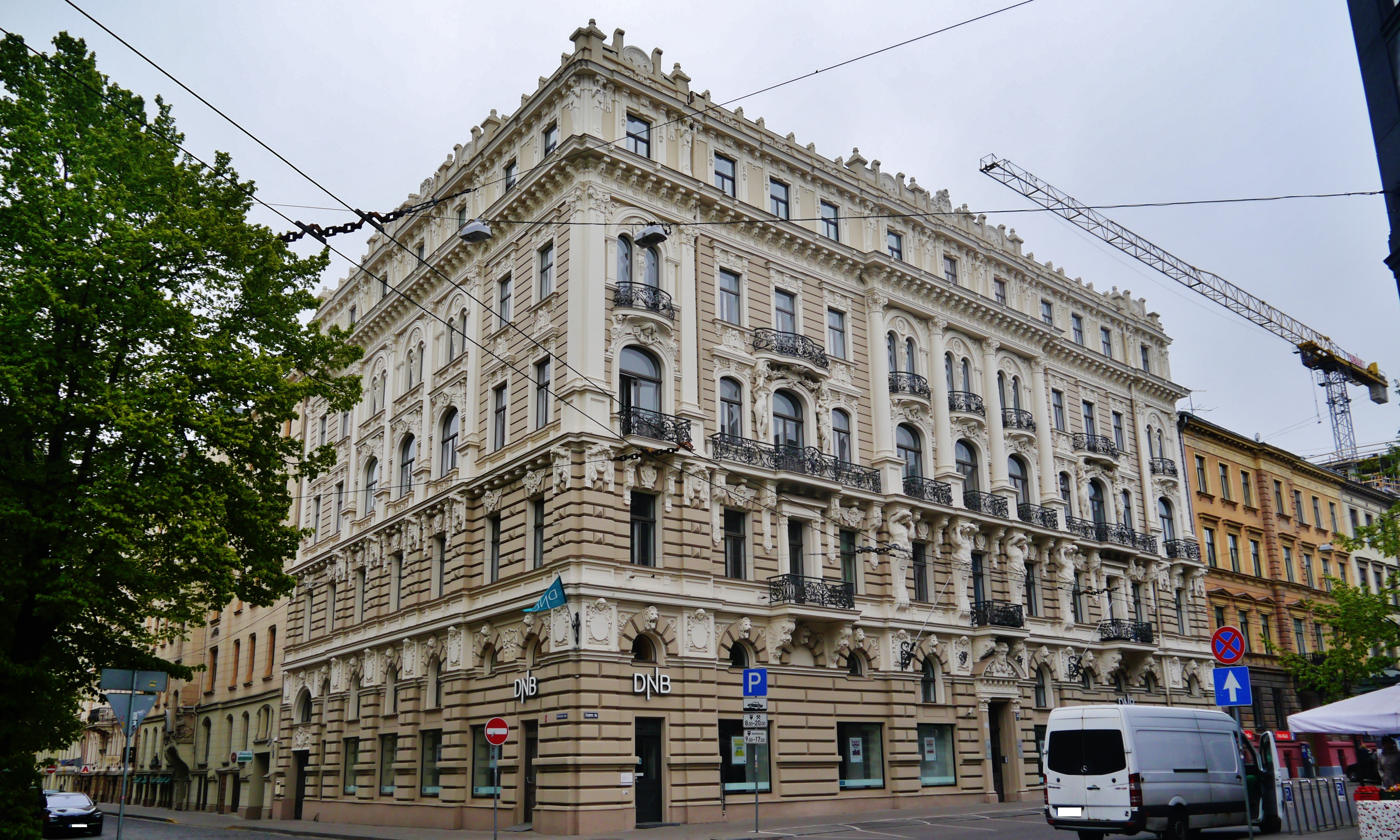
Building on Elizabetes iela 33

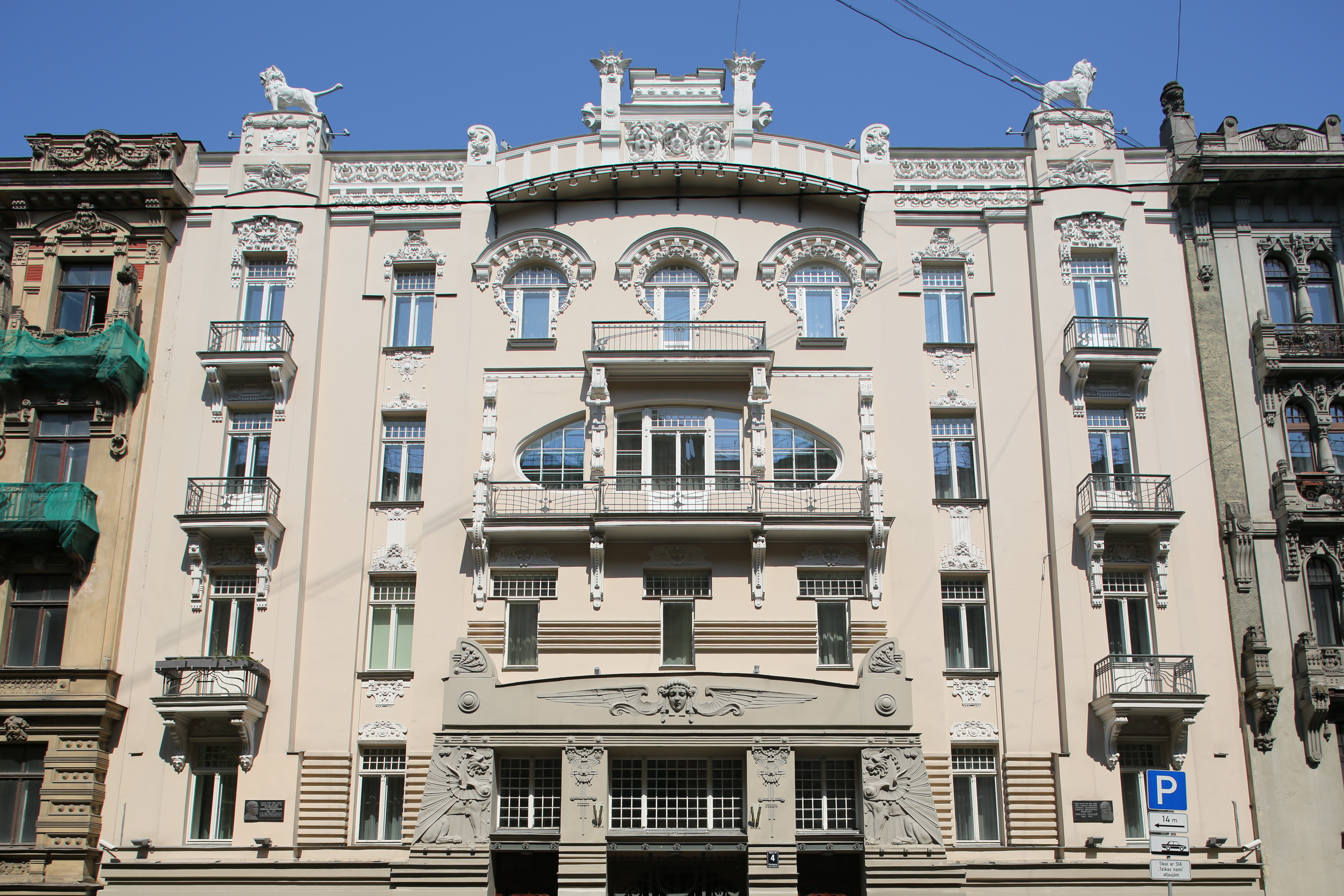
Building on Alberta iela 4

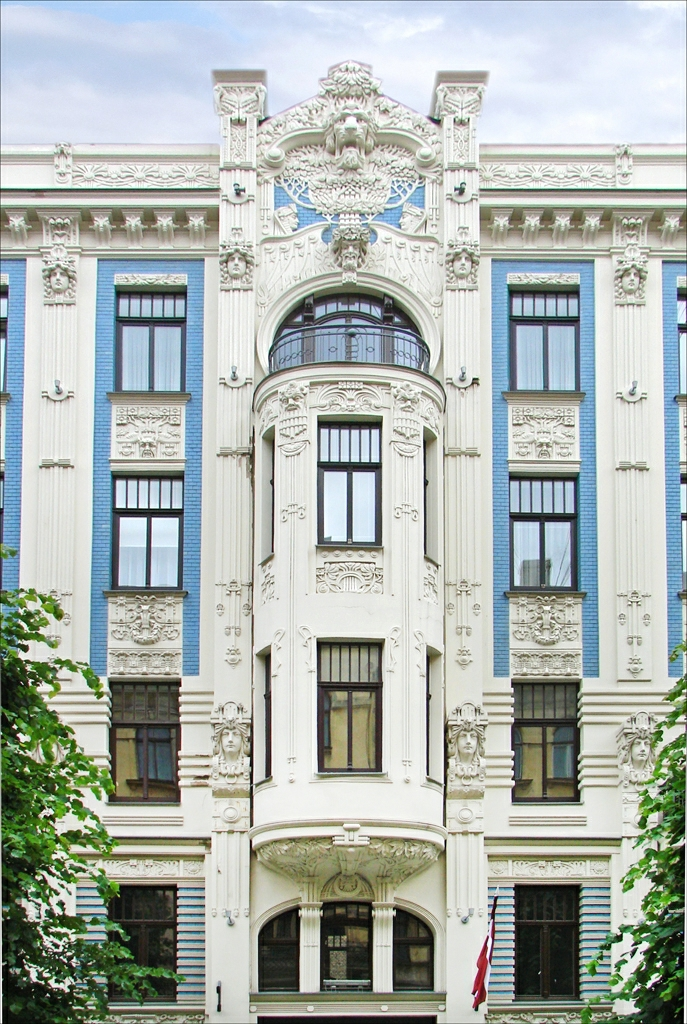
Building on Alberta iela 8

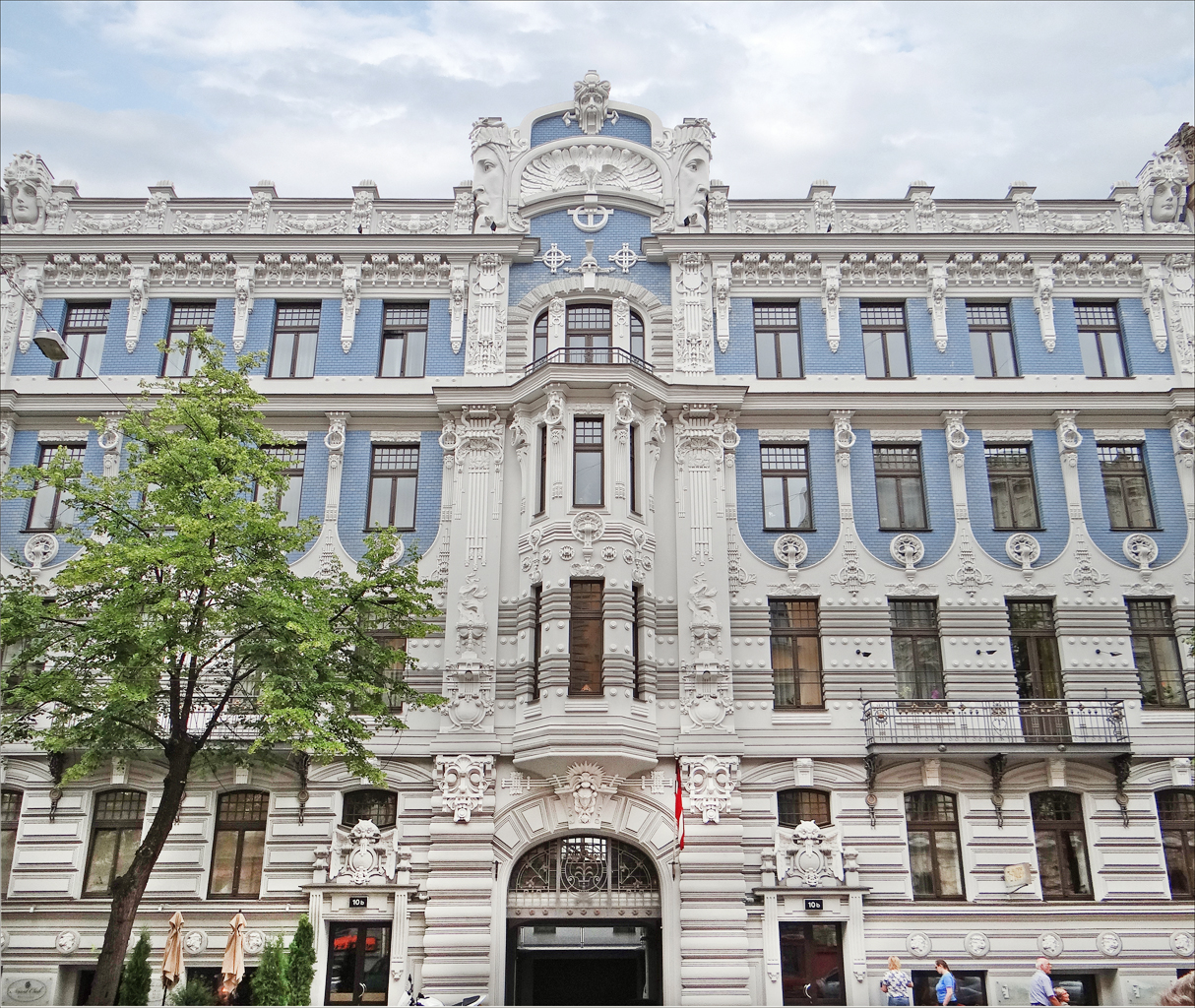
Building on Elizabetes iela 10b

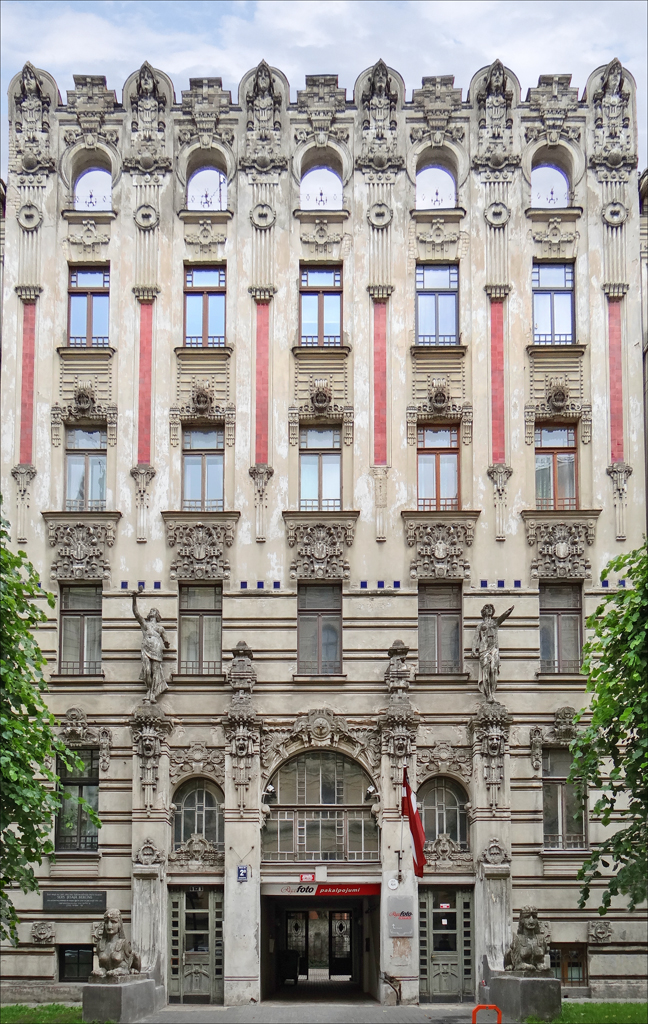
Building on Alberta iela 2a

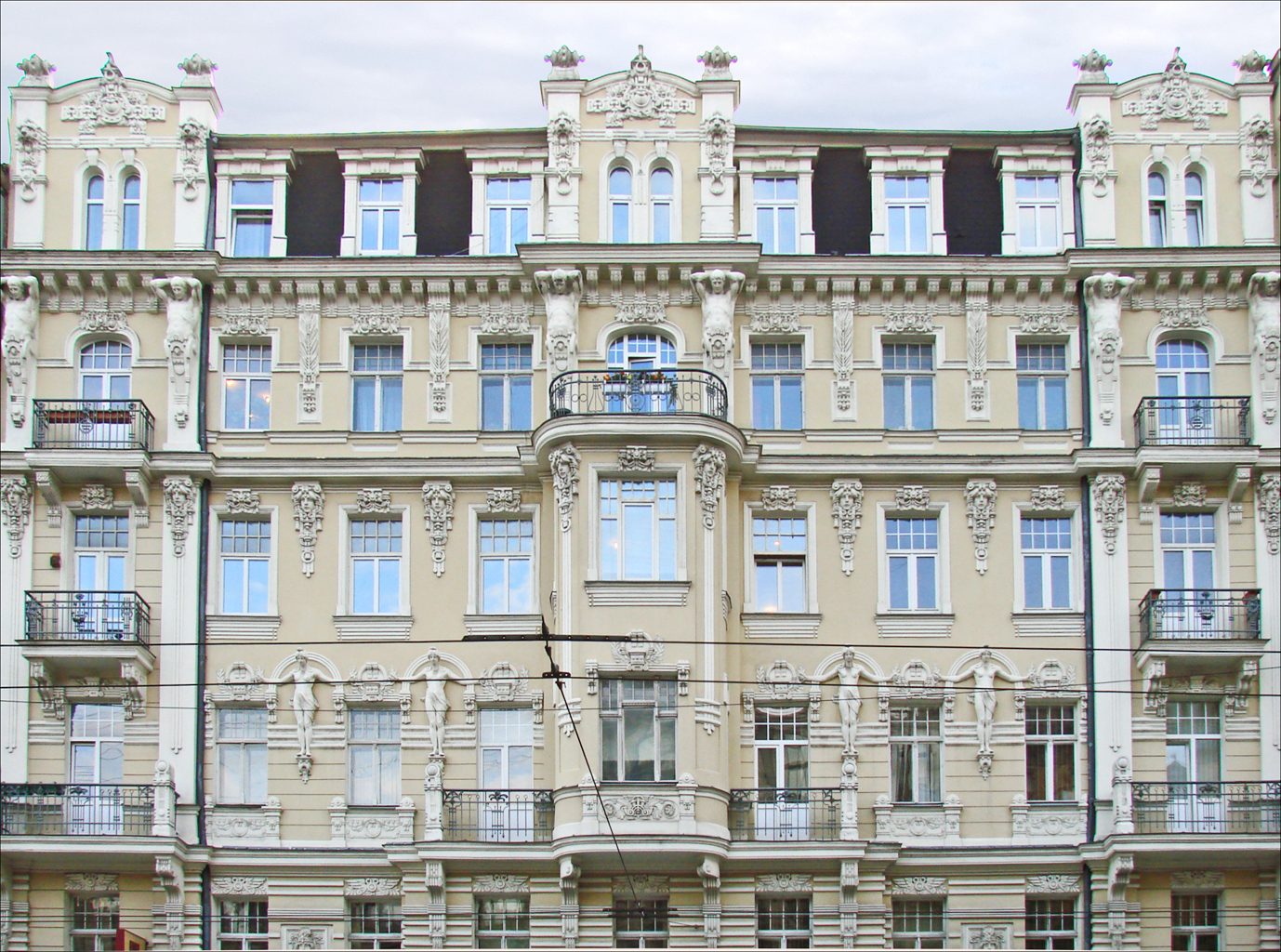
Building on Brivibas iela 99

== Examples of decorative sculpture from facades ==
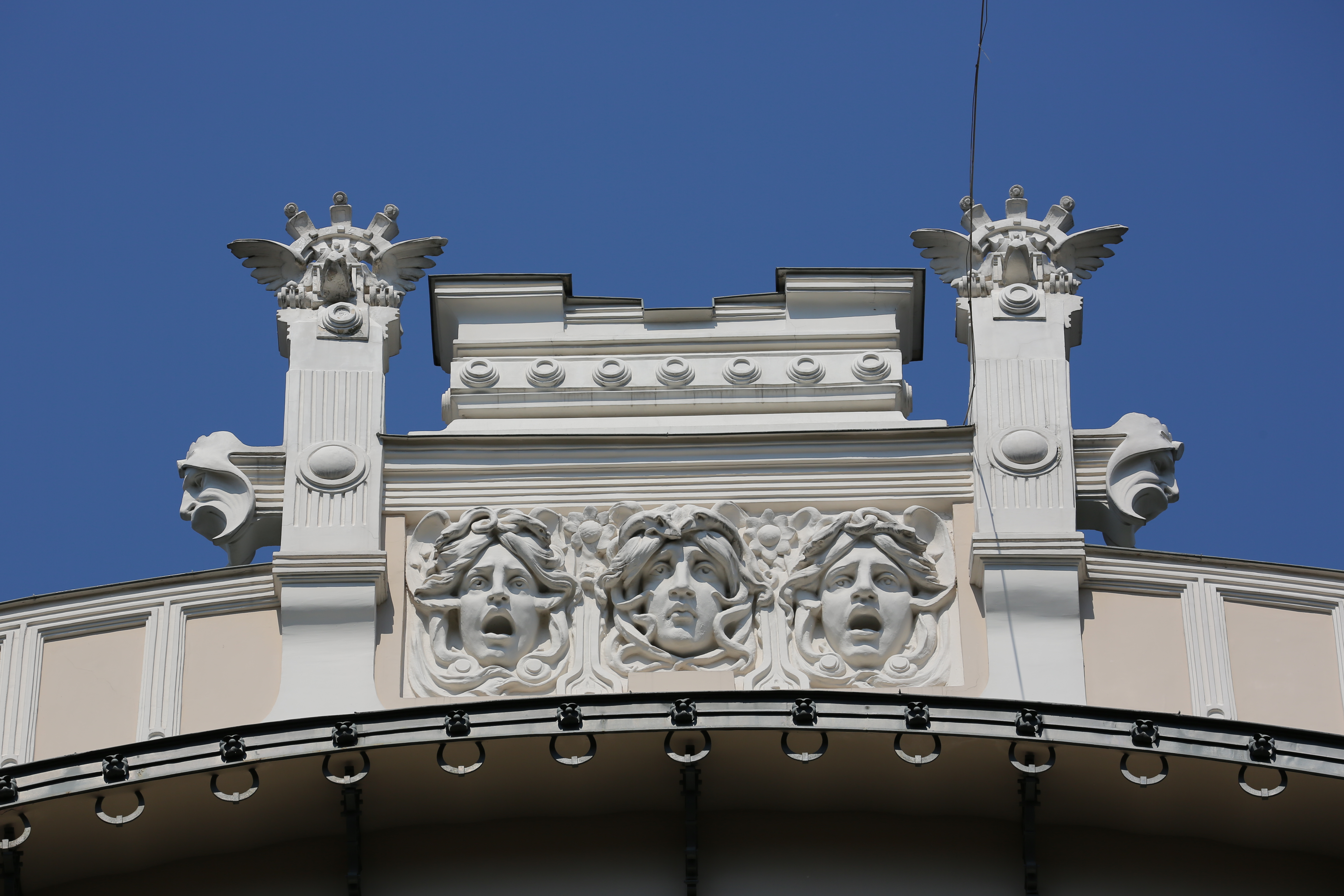
Building on Alberta iela 4

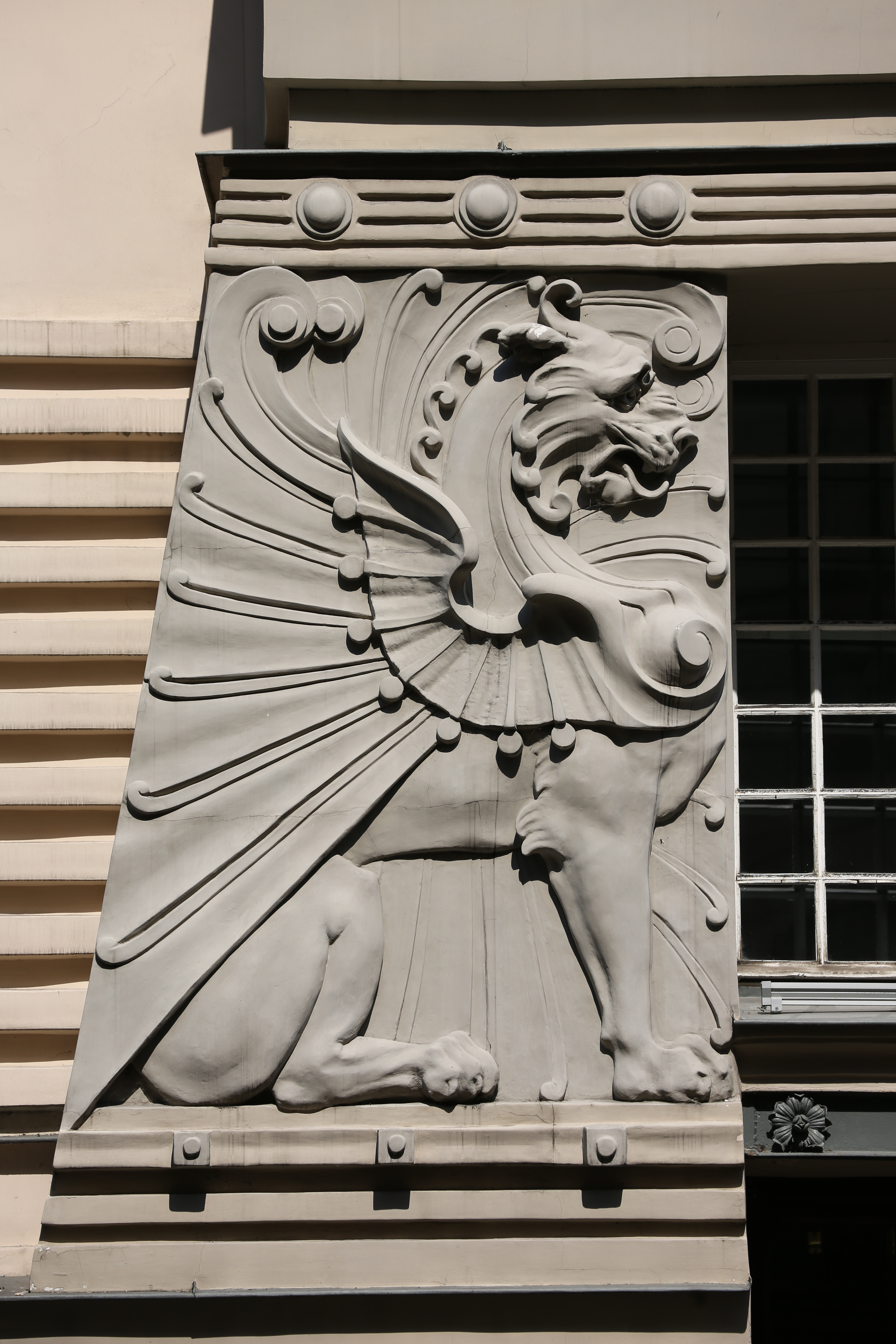
Building on Alberta iela 4

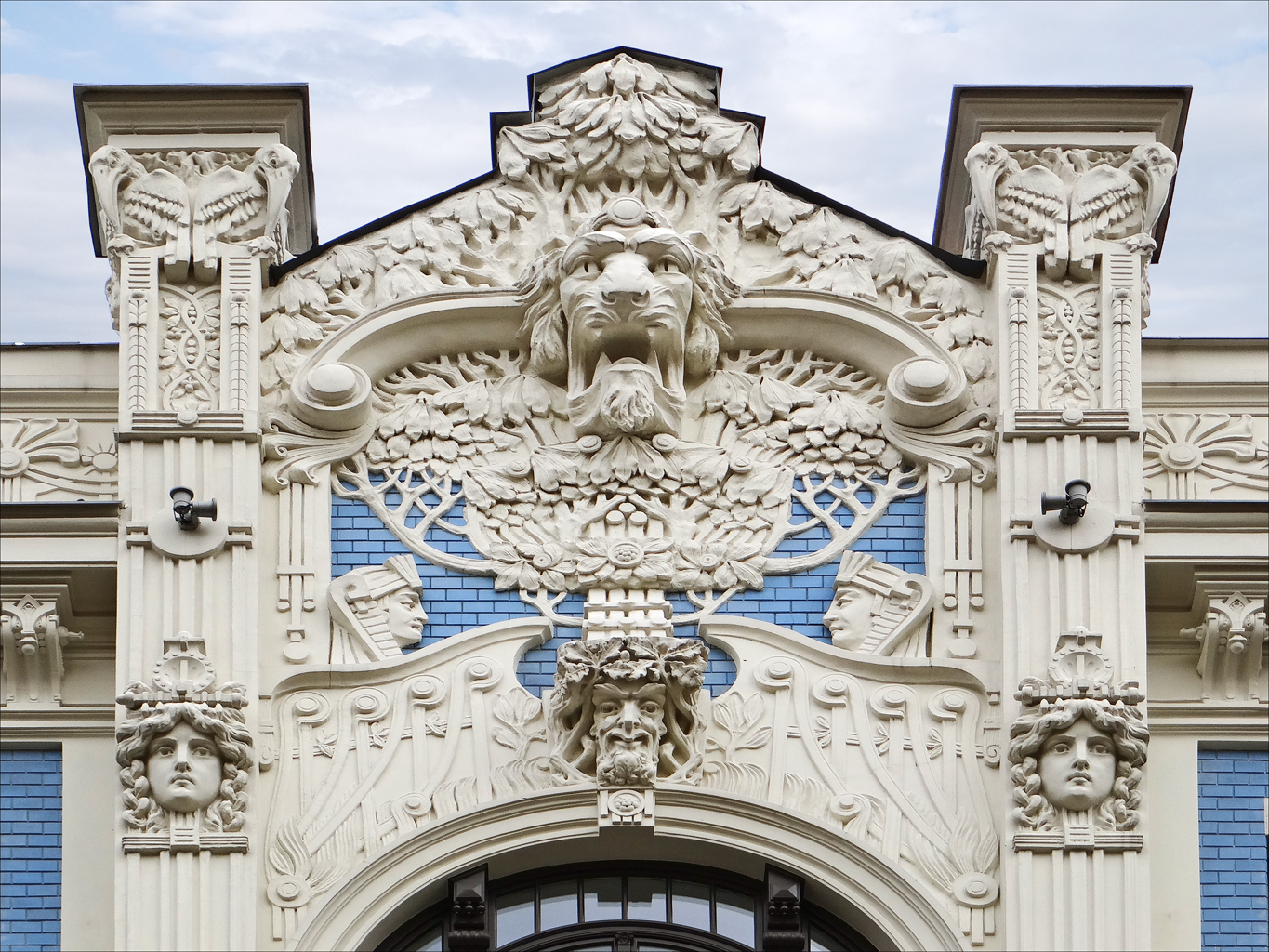
Building on Alberta iela 8

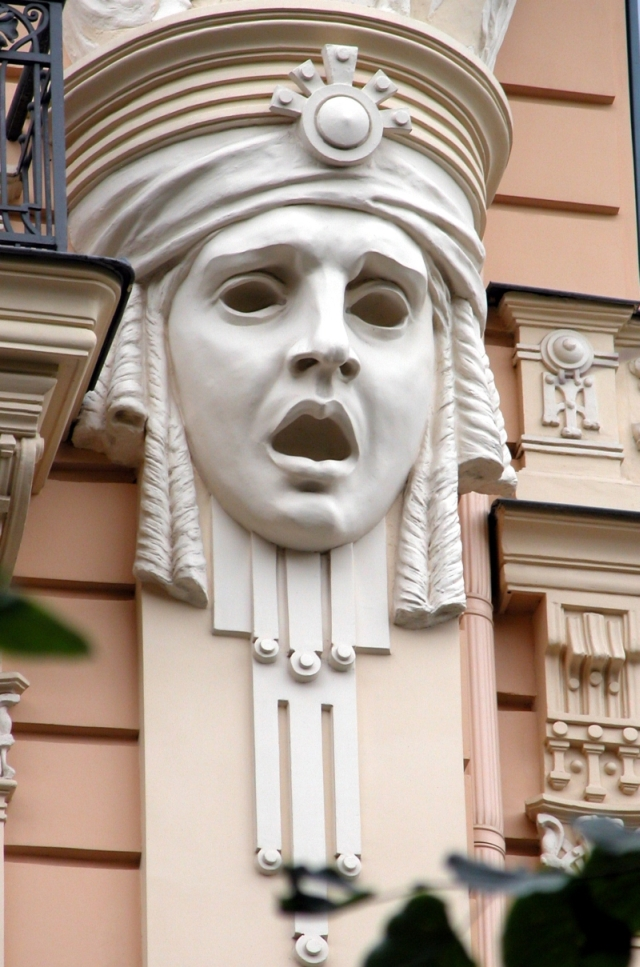
Building on the corner of Alberta iela and Strelnieku iela

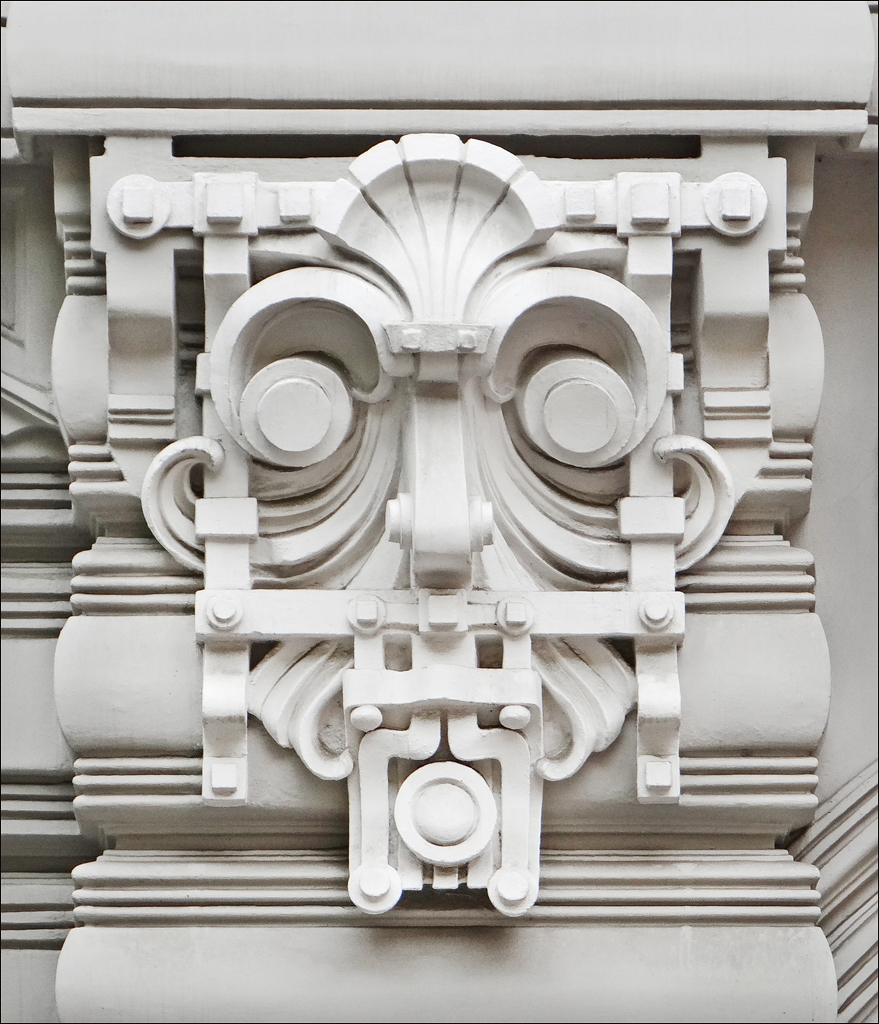
Building on Elizabetes iela 10b

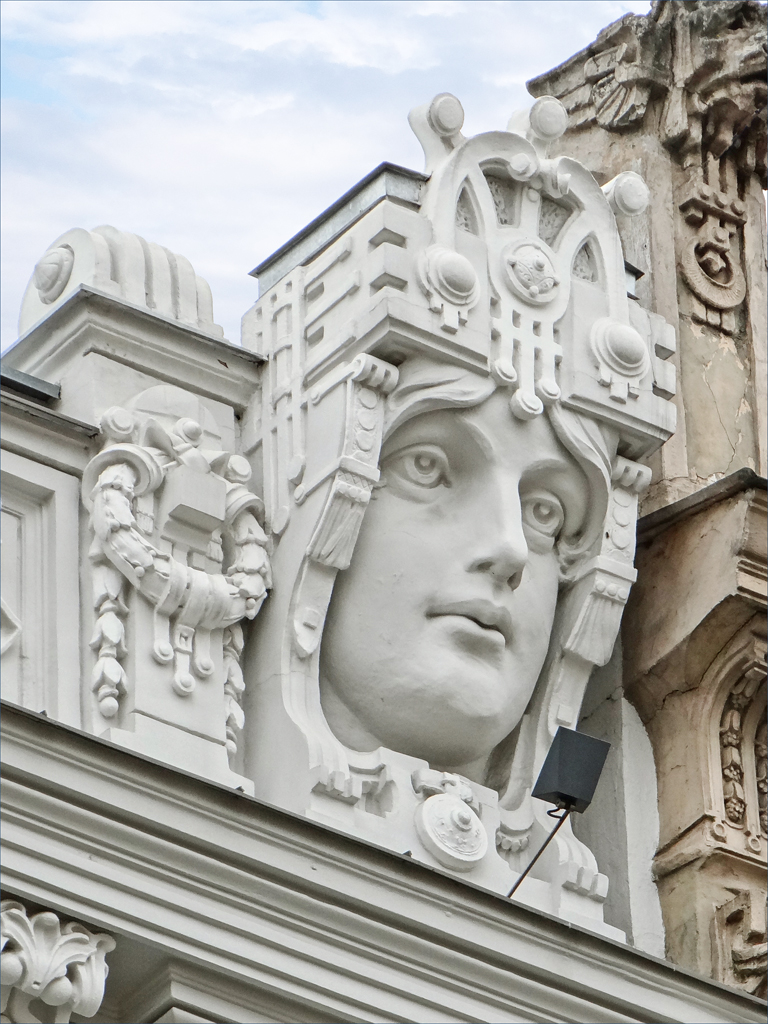
Building on Elizabetes iela 10b

== See also ==
- Art Nouveau architecture in Riga

== Bibliography ==
- Grosa, Silvija (2003). Art Nouveau in Riga. Jumava. ISBN 9984-05-601-5.
- Howard, Jeremy (1996). Art Nouveau: International and National Styles in Europe. Manchester University Press. ISBN 0-7190-4160-0.
- Krastins, Janis (1996). Riga. Jugendstilmetropole. Art Nouveau Metropolis. Jugendstila Metropole. Riga: Baltika. ISBN 9984-9178-1-9.
- Krastins, Janis (2014). Art Nouveau buildings in Riga (3rd ed.). Riga: ADD PROJEKTS. ISBN 978-9934-8318-2-9.
- Rush, Solveiga (2003). Mikhail Eisenstein. Themes and symbols in Art Nouveau architecture of Riga 1901–1906. Riga: Neputns. ISBN 9984-729-31-1.
